= Comparison of high-definition smartphone displays =

The following is a comparison of high-definition smartphone displays, containing information about their specific screen technology, resolution, size and pixel density. It is divided into three categories, containing smartphones with 720p, 1080p and 1440p displays.

The "p-display" nomenclature used in this article refers to the number of pixels displayed across the width of a given phone's screen. Earlier phones with lower than 720p (lower than HD ready resolution) are not included in this listing. The lists below are dynamic lists and may be sorted into alphabetical order by clicking on the "sort icons" at the top of the first column.

== Display resolutions ==
Display size row	Display size col	Total Pixels	Note
720	1280	921,600	standard high density (HD ready) display
1080	1920	2,073,600	standard Full HD (FHD) display
1440	2560	3,686,400	standard Quad HD (QHD) display
2160	3840	8,294,400	standard Ultra HD (UHD) display, 4K UHD (2K by 4K)

== 720p (HD ready) ==
Brand	Model	Release month	Operating system	Display type	Resolution (pixels) or px	Display size	Pixel density (ppi)
Acer	CloudMobile	September 2012	Android 4.0	IPS LCD	1280 × 720	4.3 in (110 mm)	342
Asus	Padfone 2	November 2012	Android 4.0/4.1	Super IPS+ LCD	1280 × 720	4.7 in (120 mm)	312
Huawei	Ascend D1	June 2012	Android 4.0	IPS LCD	1280 × 720	4.5 in (110 mm)	326
Huawei	Honor 2	October 2012	Android 4.0	IPS LCD	1280 × 720	4.5 in (110 mm)	326
Huawei	Honor 3X G750	December 2013	Android v4.2.2	IPS LCD	1280 × 720	5.5 in (140 mm)	267
Huawei	Ascend P2	April 2013	Android 4.1	IPS LCD	1280 × 720	4.7 in (120 mm)	312
Huawei	Ascend Mate	March 2013	Android 4.1	IPS LCD	1280 × 720	6.1 in (150 mm)	241
HTC	Rezound	November 2012	Android 2.3/4.0	Super LCD	1280 × 720	4.3 in (110 mm)	342
HTC	One X/XL	April 2012	Android 4.0/4.1	Super LCD2	1280 × 720	4.7 in (120 mm)	312
HTC	One Mini	July 2013	Android 4.2.2	Super LCD2	1280 × 720	4.3 in (110 mm)	342
HTC	Windows Phone 8X	December 2012	Windows Phone 8	Super LCD2	1280 × 720	4.3 in (110 mm)	342
Lenovo	K800	September 2012	Android 2.3/4.0	LCD	1280 × 720	4.5 in (110 mm)	326
Lenovo	K860	September 2012	Android 4.0	IPS LCD	1280 × 720	5.0 in (130 mm)	294
LG	Nitro HD/Optimus 4G LTE	December 2011	Android 2.3/4.0	AH-IPS LCD	1280 × 720	4.5 in (110 mm)	326
LG	Optimus 4X HD	June 2012	Android 4.0	TrueHD IPS LCD	1280 × 720	4.7 in (120 mm)	312
LG	Optimus L9 II	August 2013	Android 4.1	TrueHD IPS Plus LCD	1280 × 720	4.7 in (120 mm)	312
LG	G Flex	November 2013	Android 4.2.2	P-OLED	1280 × 720	6 in (150 mm)	245
LG	Spirit	March 2015	Android 5.0.1	IPS LCD	1280 × 720	4.7 in (120 mm)	312
LG	G Stylo	May 2015	Android 5.0	IPS LCD	1280 × 720	5.7 in (140 mm)	258
LG	Magna	May 2015	Android 5.0.1	IPS LCD	1280 × 720	5 in (130 mm)	294
LG	K10	January 2016	Android 5.1.1/6.0	IPS LCD	1280 × 720	5.3 in (130 mm)	277
LG	K8	April 2016	Android 6.0	IPS LCD	1280 × 720	5 in (130 mm)	294
Microsoft	Lumia 640	March 2015	Windows Phone 8.1	ClearBlack IPS LCD	1280 × 720	5.0 in (130 mm)	294
Microsoft	Lumia 640 XL	March 2015	Windows Phone 8.1	ClearBlack IPS LCD	1280 × 720	5.7 in (140 mm)	259
Motorola	Atrix HD	July 2012	Android 4.0/4.1	TFT	1280 × 720	4.5 in (110 mm)	326
Motorola	Droid Razr HD	October 2012	Android 4.0/4.1	Super AMOLED	1280 × 720	4.7 in (120 mm)	312
Motorola	Moto X	August 2013	Android 4.2/4.4	AMOLED	1280 × 720	4.7 in (120 mm)	312
Motorola	Moto G	November 2013	Android 4.3/5.1.1	IPS LCD	1280 × 720	4.5 in (110 mm)	326
Motorola	Moto G (2nd)	September 2014	Android 4.4.4/6.0	IPS LCD	1280 × 720	5 in (130 mm)	294
Motorola	Moto G (3rd)	July 2015	Android 5.1.1/6.0	IPS LCD	1280 × 720	5 in (130 mm)	294
Motorola	Moto E3	September 2016	Android 6.0	IPS LCD	1280 × 720	5 in (130 mm)	294
Motorola	Moto E4	June 2017	Android 7.1	IPS LCD	1280 × 720	5 in (130 mm)	294
Motorola	Moto E5	May 2018	Android 8.0	IPS LCD	1440 × 720	5.7 in (140 mm)	282
Nokia	Lumia 730/735	September 2014	Windows Phone 8.1	ClearBlack OLED	1280 × 720	4.7 in (120 mm)	316
Nokia	Lumia 830	October 2014	Windows Phone 8.1	ClearBlack IPS LCD	1280 × 720	5.0 in (130 mm)	296
Nokia	Lumia 1320	November 2013	Windows Phone 8	ClearBlack IPS LCD	1280 × 720	6.0 in (150 mm)	245
Nokia	3	June 2017	Android 7.0	IPS LCD	1280 × 720	5 in (130 mm)	294
Nokia	5	July 2017	Android 7.1.1	IPS LCD	1280 × 720	5.5 in (140 mm)	282
Nokia	2	November 2017	Android 7.1.1	LTPS IPS LCD	1280 × 720	5 in (130 mm)	294
Nokia	3.1	May 2018	Android 8.0	IPS LCD	1440 × 720	5.2 in (130 mm)	310
Nokia	5.1 Plus	July 2018	Android 8.1	IPS LCD	1520 × 720	5.86 in (149 mm)	287
Nokia	2.1	August 2018	Android 8.1	IPS LCD	1280 × 720	5.5 in (140 mm)	267
Nokia	3.1 Plus	October 2018	Android 8.1	IPS LCD	1440 × 720	6 in (150 mm)	268
Panasonic	ELUGA power	May 2012	Android 4.0	TFT	1280 × 720	5.0 in (130 mm)	294
Panasonic	ELUGA V	July 2012	Android 4.0	TFT	1280 × 720	4.6 in (120 mm)	319
Redmi	1	August 2013	Android 4.2	IPS LCD	1280 × 720	4.7 in (120 mm)	312
Redmi	Note	March 2014	Android 4.2	IPS LCD	1280 × 720	5.5 in (140 mm)	267
Redmi	2	January 2015	Android 4.4.4	IPS LCD	1280 × 720	4.7 in (120 mm)	312
Redmi	Note Prime	December 2015	Android 4.4.4	IPS LCD	1280 × 720	5.5 in (140 mm)	267
Redmi	3	January 2016	Android 5.1	IPS LCD	1280 × 720	5 in (130 mm)	294
Redmi	4/4X	May 2017	Android 6.0.1	IPS LCD	1280 × 720	5 in (130 mm)	294
Redmi	5	December 2017	Android 7.1.2	IPS LCD	1440 × 720	5.7 in (140 mm)	282
Samsung	Ativ S	December 2012	Windows Phone 8	HD Super AMOLED	1280 × 720	4.8 in (120 mm)	306
Samsung	Galaxy Note II	October 2012	Android 4.1	HD Super AMOLED	1280 × 720	5.5 in (140 mm)	267
Samsung	Galaxy Nexus	November 2011	Android 4.0/4.1/4.2	HD Super AMOLED	1280 × 720	4.65 in (118 mm)	319
Samsung	Galaxy S II HD LTE	December 2011	Android 2.3/4.0	HD Super AMOLED	1280 × 720	4.65 in (118 mm)	319
Samsung	Galaxy S III	May 2012	Android 4.0/4.1	HD Super AMOLED	1280 × 720	4.8 in (120 mm)	306
Samsung	Galaxy Premier	November 2012	Android 4.1	HD Super AMOLED	1280 × 720	4.65 in (118 mm)	319
Samsung	Galaxy Mega 6.3	June 2013	Android 4.1	TFT	1280 × 720	6.3 in (160 mm)	234
Samsung	Samsung Galaxy A20	April 2019	Android 9.0	HD Super AMOLED	1560 × 720	6.4 in (160 mm)	268
Sony	Xperia S/SL	February 2012	Android 2.3/4.0	TFT	1280 × 720	4.3 in (110 mm)	342
Sony	Xperia acro S	August 2012	Android 4.0	TFT	1280 × 720	4.3 in (110 mm)	342
Sony	Xperia SP	October 2012	Android 4.1/4.2	TFT	1280 × 720	4.6 in (120 mm)	320
Sony	Xperia ZR	June 2013	Android 4.1.2	IPS LCD	1280 × 720	4.55 in (116 mm)	323
Sony	Xperia Z1 Compact	January 2014	Android 4.3	IPS LCD	1280 × 720	4.3 in (110 mm)	342
Sony	Xperia Z3 Compact	September 2014	Android 4.4.4	IPS LCD	1280 × 720	4.6 in (120 mm)	319
Sony	Xperia Z5 Compact	October 2015	Android 5.1.1	IPS LCD	1280 × 720	4.6 in (120 mm)	323
Sony	Xperia XA	June 2016	Android 6.0.1	IPS LCD	1280 × 720	5.0 in (130 mm)	294
Sony	Xperia X Compact	September 2016	Android 6.0.1	IPS LCD	1280 × 720	4.6 in (120 mm)	319
Sony	Xperia XA1	April 2017	Android 7.0	IPS LCD	1280 × 720	5 in (130 mm)	294
Sony	Xperia L1	September 2017	Android 7.0	IPS LCD	1280 × 720	5.5 in (140 mm)	267
Sony	Xperia XZ1 Compact	October 2017	Android 8.0	IPS LCD	1280 × 720	4.6 in (120 mm)	319
Sony	Xperia R1 (Plus)	November 2017	Android 7.1	IPS LCD	1280 × 720	5.2 in (130 mm)	282
Sony	Xperia L2	January 2018	Android 7.1.1	IPS LCD	1280 × 720	5.5 in (140 mm)	267
Sony	Xperia L3	February 2019	Android 8.0	IPS LCD	1440 × 720	5.7 in (140 mm)	282
Sony	Xperia L4	February 2020	Android 9.0	IPS LCD	1680 × 720	6.2 in (160 mm)	295
Xiaomi	Mi-Two	November 2012	Android 4.1	IPS LCD	1280 × 720	4.3 in (110 mm)	342
Xiaomi	Mi-2S	April 2013	Android 4.1	IPS LCD	1280 × 720	4.3 in (110 mm)	342
ZTE	Flash	November 2012	Android 4.0	IPS LCD	1280 × 720	4.5 in (110 mm)	326
ZTE	Grand Memo	March 2013	Android 4.1	IPS LCD	1280 × 720	5.7 in (140 mm)	258
ZTE	Max	January 2014	Android 4.1	IPS LCD	1280 × 720	5.7 in (140 mm)	258
ZTE	PF112 HD	December 2012	Android 4.0	TFT	1280 × 720	4.5 in (110 mm)	326
ZTE	Warp 4G	September 2013	Android 4.1	IPS LCD	1280 × 720	4.5 in (110 mm)	326

== 750-828 nonstandard ==
Brand	Model	Release month	Operating system	Display type	Resolution (pixels) or px	Display size	Pixel density (ppi)
Apple Inc.	iPhone 6	September 2014	iOS 8	IPS LCD	1334 × 750	4.7 in (120 mm)	326
Apple Inc.	iPhone 6S	September 2015	iOS 9	IPS LCD	1334 × 750	4.7 in (120 mm)	326
Apple Inc.	iPhone 7	September 2016	iOS 10	IPS LCD	1334 × 750	4.7 in (120 mm)	326
Apple Inc.	iPhone 8	September 2017	iOS 11	IPS LCD	1334 × 750	4.7 in (120 mm)	326
Apple Inc.	iPhone XR	October 2018	iOS 12	Liquid Retina IPS LCD	1792 × 828	6.1 in (150 mm)	326
Apple Inc.	iPhone 11	September 2019	iOS 13	Liquid Retina IPS LCD	1792 × 828	6.1 in (150 mm)	326
BlackBerry	Z10	February 2013	BlackBerry 10	IPS LCD	1280 × 768	4.2 in (110 mm)	355
LG	Optimus Vu	August 2012	Android 4.0.4	IPS LCD	1024 × 768	5.0 in (130 mm)	256
LG	Nexus 4	November 2012	Android 4.2	TrueHD IPS Plus LCD	1280 × 768	4.7 in (120 mm)	318
LG	Optimus G	October 2012	Android 4.0/4.1	TrueHD IPS Plus LCD	1280 × 768	4.7 in (120 mm)	318
Meizu	MX2	December 2012	Android 4.1	TFT LCD ASV	1280 × 800	4.4 in (110 mm)	343
Nokia	Lumia 920	November 2012	Windows Phone 8	PureMotion HD+ IPS LCD	1280 × 768	4.5 in (110 mm)	332
Nokia	Lumia 925/928	June 2013	Windows Phone 8	ClearBlack AMOLED	1280 × 768	4.5 in (110 mm)	332
Nokia	Lumia 1020	August 2013	Windows Phone 8	ClearBlack AMOLED	1280 × 768	4.5 in (110 mm)	332
Samsung	Galaxy Note	October 2011	Android 2.3/4.0/4.1	HD Super AMOLED	1280 × 800	5.3 in (130 mm)	285

== 1080p ==
Brand	Model	Release month	Operating system	Display type	Resolution (pixels)	Display size	Pixel density (ppi)
Acer	Liquid S2	October 2013	Android 4.2	IPS LCD	1920 × 1080	6.0 in (150 mm)	367
Apple Inc.	iPhone 6 Plus	September 2014	iOS 8	IPS LCD	1920 × 1080	5.5 in (140 mm)	401
Apple Inc.	iPhone 6S Plus	September 2015	iOS 9	IPS LCD	1920 × 1080	5.5 in (140 mm)	401
Apple Inc.	iPhone 7 Plus	September 2016	iOS 10	IPS LCD	1920 × 1080	5.5 in (140 mm)	401
Apple Inc.	iPhone 8 Plus	September 2017	iOS 11	IPS LCD	1920 × 1080	5.5 in (140 mm)	401
Apple Inc.	iPhone 12 mini	November 2020	iOS 14	OLED	2340 × 1080	5.4 in (140 mm)	476
Apple Inc.	iPhone 13 mini	September 2021	iOS 15	OLED	2340 × 1080	5.4 in (140 mm)	476
Alcatel	idol X	June 2013	Android 4.2	IPS LCD	1920 × 1080	5.0 in (130 mm)	441
Alcatel	One Touch Hero	September 2013	Android 4.2	IPS LCD	1920 × 1080	6.0 in (150 mm)	367
Asus	Padfone Infinity	May 2013	Android 4.2	Super IPS+ LCD	1920 × 1080	5.0 in (130 mm)	441
Asus	Fonepad Note 6	November 2013	Android 4.2	Super IPS+ LCD	1920 × 1080	6.0 in (150 mm)	367
BQ	Aquaris X2	June 2018	Android 8.1	LTPS IPS LCD	2160 × 1080	5.65 in (144 mm)	428
Coolpad	Magview 4	September 2013	Android 4.2	TFT IGZO	1920 × 1080	5.9 in (150 mm)	380
Fujitsu	ARROWS X F-02E	February 2013	Android 4.1	TFT	1920 × 1080	5.0 in (130 mm)	441
Fujitsu	ARROWS NX F-06E	June 2013	Android 4.2	TFT	1920 × 1080	5.2 in (130 mm)	424
Fujitsu	ARROWS A 202F	June 2013	Android 4.2	TFT	1920 × 1080	5.0 in (130 mm)	441
Gionee	Elife E6	July 2013	Android 4.2	IPS LCD	1920 × 1080	5.0 in (130 mm)	441
Google	Pixel	October 2016	Android 7.1	AMOLED	1920 × 1080	5.0 in (130 mm)	441
Google	Pixel 2	October 2017	Android 8.0	AMOLED	1920 × 1080	5.0 in (130 mm)	441
Google	Pixel 3	October 2018	Android 9.0	AMOLED	2160 × 1080	5.5 in (140 mm)	443
Google	Pixel 4	October 2019	Android 10.0	OLED	2280 × 1080	5.7 in (140 mm)	444
Google	Pixel 5	October 2020	Android 11.0	OLED	2340 × 1080	6 in (150 mm)	432
Google	Pixel 6	October 2021	Android 12.0	OLED	2400 × 1080	6.4 in (160 mm)	411
Google	Pixel 7	October 2022	Android 13.0	OLED	2400 × 1080	6.3 in (160 mm)	416
Huawei	Ascend D2	March 2013	Android 4.1	IPS LCD	1920 × 1080	5.0 in (130 mm)	441
Huawei	Ascend P7	June 2014	Android 4.4.2	IPS LCD	1920 × 1080	5.0 in (130 mm)	441
Huawei	P10	March 2017	Android 7.0	IPS LCD	1920 × 1080	5.1 in (130 mm)	432
Huawei	Mate 9	November 2016	Android 7.0	IPS LCD	1920 × 1080	5.9 in (150 mm)	373
Huawei	Mate 10 Pro	October 2017	Android 8.0	AMOLED	2160 × 1080	5.5 in (140 mm)	443
Huawei	P20	March 2018	Android 8.1	IPS LCD	2240 × 1080	5.8 in (150 mm)	429
Huawei	Mate 20	October 2018	Android 9.0	IPS LCD	2244 × 1080	6.5 in (170 mm)	381
Huawei	P30	March 2019	Android 9.0	AMOLED	2340 × 1080	6.1 in (150 mm)	422
Huawei	Mate 30	September 2019	Android 10.0	OLED	2340 × 1080	6.62 in (168 mm)	389
Huawei	P40	April 2020	Android 10.0	OLED	2340 × 1080	6.1 in (150 mm)	422
Huawei	Mate 40	December 2020	Android 10.0	OLED	2376 × 1080	6.5 in (170 mm)	422
HTC	Droid DNA/Butterfly	November 2012	Android 4.1/4.2	Super LCD3	1920 × 1080	5.0 in (130 mm)	441
HTC	One (M7)	March 2013	Android 4.1/4.4.2	Super LCD3	1920 × 1080	4.7 in (120 mm)	468
HTC	One Max	October 2013	Android 4.3	Super LCD3	1920 × 1080	5.9 in (150 mm)	376
HTC	Butterfly S	July 2013	Android 4.2	Super LCD3	1920 × 1080	5.0 in (130 mm)	441
HTC	One (M8)	March 2014	Android 4.4.2	Super LCD3	1920 × 1080	5.0 in (130 mm)	441
iBerry	Auxus Nuclea n1	July 2013	Android 4.2	TFT	1920 × 1080	5.0 in (130 mm)	441
Intex	Aqua i7	September 2013	Android 4.2	IPS LCD	1920 × 1080	5.0 in (130 mm)	441
iOcean	X7	April 2013	Android 4.2	IPS LCD	1920 × 1080	5.0 in (130 mm)	441
Koobee	Max (X7)	March 2013	Android 4.2	IPS LCD	1920 × 1080	5.0 in (130 mm)	441
Lenovo	K900	April 2013	Android 4.2	IPS LCD	1920 × 1080	5.5 in (140 mm)	401
Lenovo	Vibe X	October 2013	Android 4.2	IPS LCD	1920 × 1080	5.0 in (130 mm)	441
LG	Optimus G Pro	April 2013	Android 4.1/4.2	TrueHD IPS Plus LCD	1920 × 1080	5.5 in (140 mm)	401
LG	G2	September 2013	Android 4.2.2/4.4.2	TrueHD IPS Plus LCD	1920 × 1080	5.2 in (130 mm)	424
LG	Nexus 5	October 2013	Android 4.4/4.4.1/4.4.2	TrueHD IPS Plus LCD	1920 × 1080	4.95 in (126 mm)	445
LG	G Pro 2	March 2014	Android 4.4.2	TrueHD IPS Plus LCD	1920 × 1080	5.9 in (150 mm)	373
LG	G Flex2	February 2015	Android 5.0.1	P-OLED	1920 × 1080	5.5 in (140 mm)	403
LG	G Vista 2	November 2015	Android 5.1	IPS LCD	1920 × 1080	5.7 in (140 mm)	386
LG	Q6	August 2017	Android 7.1.1	IPS LCD	2160 × 1080	5.5 in (140 mm)	442
LG	Q8 (2018)	August 2018	Android 8.1	IPS LCD	2160 × 1080	6.2 in (160 mm)	389
LG	G8X ThinQ	November 2019	Android 9.0	OLED	2340 × 1080	6.4 in (160 mm)	403
LG	V60 ThinQ	March 2020	Android 10.0	P-OLED	2460 × 1080	6.8 in (170 mm)	395
Meizu	MX3	September 2013	Android 4.2	CG Silicon (IPS)	1800 × 1080	5.1 in (130 mm)	412
Micromax	Canvas Turbo A250	October 2013	Android 4.2	IPS CGS	1920 × 1080	5 in (130 mm)	441
Micromax	Canvas Knight A350	February 2014	Android 4.2/4.4	IPS CGS	1920 × 1080	5 in (130 mm)	441
Motorola	Moto X (2nd)	September 2014	Android 4.4.4/6.0	AMOLED	1920 × 1080	5.2 in (130 mm)	424
Motorola	Moto X Play	August 2015	Android 5.1.1/7.1.1	IPS LCD	1920 × 1080	5.5 in (140 mm)	403
Motorola	Moto G4	May 2016	Android 6.0.1	IPS LCD	1920 × 1080	5.5 in (140 mm)	401
Motorola	Moto Z Play	September 2016	Android 6.0.1	AMOLED	1920 × 1080	5.5 in (140 mm)	403
Motorola	Moto G5	March 2017	Android 7.0	IPS LCD	1920 × 1080	5 in (130 mm)	441
Motorola	Moto Z2 Play	June 2017	Android 7.1.1	AMOLED	1920 × 1080	5.5 in (140 mm)	401
Motorola	Moto X4	October 2017	Android 7.1	LTPS IPS LCD	1920 × 1080	5.2 in (130 mm)	424
Motorola	Moto G6	April 2018	Android 8.0	IPS LCD	2160 × 1080	5.7 in (140 mm)	424
Motorola	Moto Z3	August 2018	Android 8.1	AMOLED	2160 × 1080	6 in (150 mm)	402
Motorola	Moto G7	March 2019	Android 9.0	LTPS IPS LCD	2270 × 1080	6.2 in (160 mm)	405
Motorola	One Vision	May 2019	Android 9.0	LTPS IPS LCD	2520 × 1080	6.3 in (160 mm)	432
Motorola	Moto Z4	June 2019	Android 9.0	OLED	2340 × 1080	6.4 in (160 mm)	403
Motorola	Moto G8 Plus	October 2019	Android 9.0	LTPS IPS LCD	2280 × 1080	6.3 in (160 mm)	400
Motorola	Edge/Edge+	May 2020	Android 10.0	OLED	2340 × 1080	6.7 in (170 mm)	385
Motorola	Edge 20	August 2021	Android 11.0	OLED	2400 × 1080	6.7 in (170 mm)	393
NEO	1080P-N003	September 2013	Android 4.2	IPS LCD	1920 × 1080	5.0 in (130 mm)	441
Nokia	Lumia 930	July 2014	Windows Phone 8.1	ClearBlack OLED	1920 × 1080	5.0 in (130 mm)	441
Nokia	Lumia 1520	November 2013	Windows Phone 8	ClearBlack IPS LCD	1920 × 1080	6.0 in (150 mm)	368
Nokia	6	January 2017	Android 7.1.1	IPS LCD	1920 × 1080	5.5 in (140 mm)	403
Nokia	7	October 2017	Android 7.1.1	IPS LCD	1920 × 1080	5.2 in (130 mm)	424
Nokia	6.1	April 2018	Android 8.1	IPS LCD	1920 × 1080	5.5 in (140 mm)	403
Nokia	7 Plus	March 2018	Android 8.1	IPS LCD	2160 × 1080	6 in (150 mm)	403
Nokia	5.1	August 2018	Android 8.0	IPS LCD	2160 × 1080	5.5 in (140 mm)	439
Nokia	7.1	October 2018	Android 8.1	IPS LCD	2280 × 1080	5.84 in (148 mm)	432
Nokia	8.1	December 2018	Android 9.0	IPS LCD	2280 × 1080	6.18 in (157 mm)	408
Nokia	7.2	September 2019	Android 9.0	IPS LCD	2280 × 1080	6.3 in (160 mm)	400
Nokia	8.3 5G	July 2020	Android 10.0	IPS LCD	2400 × 1080	6.81 in (173 mm)	386
Nokia	X10	June 2021	Android 11.0	IPS LCD	2400 × 1080	6.67 in (169 mm)	395
OnePlus	1	June 2014	Android 5.1.1	LTPS IPS LCD	1920 × 1080	5.5 in (140 mm)	401
OnePlus	2	July 2015	Android 6.0.1	LTPS IPS LCD	1920 × 1080	5.5 in (140 mm)	401
OnePlus	X	October 2015	Android 5.1.1	AMOLED	1920 × 1080	5.0 in (130 mm)	441
OnePlus	3	June 2016	Android 6.0.1	AMOLED	1920 × 1080	5.5 in (140 mm)	401
OnePlus	5	June 2017	Android 7.1.1	AMOLED	1920 × 1080	5.5 in (140 mm)	401
OnePlus	5T	October 2017	Android 7.1.1	AMOLED	2160 × 1080	6 in (150 mm)	402
OnePlus	6	May 2018	Android 8.1	AMOLED	2280 × 1080	6.28 in (160 mm)	402
OnePlus	6T	November 2018	Android 9.0	AMOLED	2340 × 1080	6.41 in (163 mm)	402
OnePlus	7	May 2019	Android 9.0	AMOLED	2340 × 1080	6.41 in (163 mm)	402
OnePlus	7T	October 2019	Android 10.0	AMOLED	2400 × 1080	6.55 in (166 mm)	402
OnePlus	8	April 2020	Android 10.0	AMOLED	2400 × 1080	6.55 in (166 mm)	402
OnePlus	9	March 2021	Android 11.0	AMOLED	2400 × 1080	6.55 in (166 mm)	402
Oppo	Find 5	January 2013	Android 4.1	IPS LCD	1920 × 1080	5.0 in (130 mm)	441
Oppo	N1	October 2013	Android 4.2	IPS LCD	1920 × 1080	5.9 in (150 mm)	373
Oppo	Find X	June 2018	Android 8.1	AMOLED	2340 × 1080	6.4 in (160 mm)	402
Panasonic	ELUGA X P-02E	January 2013	Android 4.1	TFT	1920 × 1080	5.0 in (130 mm)	441
Panasonic	ELUGA P P-03E	June 2013	Android 4.2	TFT	1920 × 1080	4.7 in (120 mm)	468
Pantech	Vega No.6	February 2013	Android 4.1	IPS-Pro	1920 × 1080	5.9 in (150 mm)	373
Pantech	Vega Secret Note	October 2013	Android 4.2	IPS-Pro	1920 × 1080	5.9 in (150 mm)	377
Redmi	Note 2	August 2015	Android 5.0	IPS LCD	1920 × 1080	5.5 in (140 mm)	403
Redmi	Note 4	August 2016	Android 6.0	IPS LCD	1920 × 1080	5.5 in (140 mm)	401
Redmi	4 Prime	November 2016	Android 6.0.1	IPS LCD	1920 × 1080	5 in (130 mm)	441
Redmi	Note 4X	February 2017	Android 6.0	IPS LCD	1920 × 1080	5.5 in (140 mm)	401
Redmi	Note 5/5 Plus	February 2018	Android 7.1.2	IPS LCD	2160 × 1080	6 in (150 mm)	403
Redmi	Note 6 Pro	October 2018	Android 8.1	IPS LCD	2280 × 1080	6.26 in (159 mm)	403
Redmi	Note 7	February 2019	Android 9.0	IPS LCD	2340 × 1080	6.3 in (160 mm)	409
Redmi	K20/K20 Pro	June 2019	Android 9.0	AMOLED	2340 × 1080	6.39 in (162 mm)	403
Redmi	Note 8	October 2019	Android 9.0	IPS LCD	2340 × 1080	6.3 in (160 mm)	409
Redmi	K30 Pro	March 2020	Android 10.0	AMOLED	2400 × 1080	6.67 in (169 mm)	395
Redmi	Note 9	May 2020	Android 10.0	IPS LCD	2340 × 1080	6.53 in (166 mm)	395
Samsung	Galaxy S4	April 2013	Android 4.2	FHD Super AMOLED	1920 × 1080	4.99 in (127 mm)	441
Samsung	Galaxy Note 3	October 2013	Android 4.3	FHD Super AMOLED	1920 × 1080	5.68 in (144 mm)	386
Samsung	Galaxy S5	March 2014	Android 4.4.2	FHD Super AMOLED	1920 × 1080	5.1 in (130 mm)	431
Samsung	Galaxy S10e	March 2019	Android 9.0	AMOLED	2280 × 1080	5.8 in (150 mm)	438
Samsung	Galaxy Note 10	August 2019	Android 9.0	Super AMOLED	2280 × 1080	6.3 in (160 mm)	401
Samsung	Galaxy Note 20	August 2020	Android 10.0	Super AMOLED	2400 × 1080	6.7 in (170 mm)	393
Samsung	Galaxy S21	January 2021	Android 11.0	Super AMOLED	2400 × 1080	6.2 in (160 mm)	421
Samsung	Galaxy S21+	January 2021	Android 11.0	Super AMOLED	2400 × 1080	6.7 in (170 mm)	394
Samsung	Galaxy S22	February 2022	Android 12.0	Super AMOLED	2340 × 1080	6.1 in (150 mm)	425
Samsung	Galaxy S22+	February 2022	Android 12.0	Super AMOLED	2340 × 1080	6.6 in (170 mm)	393
Sharp	AQUOS PHONE SH930W	November 2012	Android 4.1	S-CG Silicon TFT	1920 × 1080	5.0 in (130 mm)	441
Sharp	AQUOS PHONE ZETA SH-06E	May 2013	Android 4.2	TFT (IGZO)	1920 × 1080	4.8 in (120 mm)	460
Sharp	AQUOS PHONE Xx	June 2013	Android 4.2	S-CG Silicon TFT	1920 × 1080	5.0 in (130 mm)	441
Sony	Xperia Z/ZL	February 2013	Android 4.1/4.2	TFT	1920 × 1080	5.0 in (130 mm)	441
Sony	Xperia Z Ultra	July 2013	Android 4.2	Triluminos TFT	1920 × 1080	6.4 in (160 mm)	343
Sony	Xperia Z1	September 2013	Android 4.2	Triluminos TFT	1920 × 1080	5.0 in (130 mm)	441
Sony	Xperia Z2	April 2014	Android 4.2	IPS LCD	1920 × 1080	5.2 in (130 mm)	424
Sony	Xperia Z3	September 2014	Android 4.4	IPS LCD	1920 × 1080	5.2 in (130 mm)	424
Sony	Xperia Z5	September 2015	Android 5.1.1	IPS LCD	1920 × 1080	5.2 in (130 mm)	428
Sony	Xperia X	May 2016	Android 6.0.1	IPS LCD	1920 × 1080	5.0 in (130 mm)	441
Sony	Xperia XA Ultra	July 2016	Android 6.0.1	IPS LCD	1920 × 1080	6.0 in (150 mm)	367
Sony	Xperia XZ	October 2016	Android 6.0.1	IPS LCD	1920 × 1080	5.2 in (130 mm)	424
Sony	Xperia XZs	April 2017	Android 7.1	IPS LCD	1920 × 1080	5.2 in (130 mm)	424
Sony	Xperia XA1 Ultra	May 2017	Android 7.0	IPS LCD	1920 × 1080	6 in (150 mm)	367
Sony	Xperia XZ1	September 2017	Android 8.0	IPS LCD	1920 × 1080	5.2 in (130 mm)	424
Sony	Xperia XA1 Plus	October 2017	Android 7.0	IPS LCD	1920 × 1080	5.5 in (140 mm)	401
Sony	Xperia XA2	February 2018	Android 8.0	IPS LCD	1920 × 1080	5.2 in (130 mm)	424
Sony	Xperia XA2 Ultra	February 2018	Android 8.0	IPS LCD	1920 × 1080	6 in (150 mm)	367
Sony	Xperia XZ2 Compact	April 2018	Android 8.0	IPS LCD	2160 × 1080	5 in (130 mm)	483
Sony	Xperia XZ2	April 2018	Android 8.0	IPS LCD	2160 × 1080	5.7 in (140 mm)	424
Sony	Xperia XA2 Plus	September 2018	Android 8.0	IPS LCD	2160 × 1080	6 in (150 mm)	402
Sony	Xperia 10	February 2019	Android 9.0	IPS LCD	2520 × 1080	6 in (150 mm)	457
Sony	Xperia 5	October 2019	Android 9.0	OLED	2520 × 1080	6.1 in (150 mm)	449
ThL	W11	July 2013	Android 4.2	IPS LCD	1920 × 1080	5.0 in (130 mm)	441
Vivo	Xplay	June 2013	Android 4.2	IPS LCD	1920 × 1080	5.7 in (140 mm)	386
Xiaomi	Mi 3	October 2013	Android 4.1	IPS LCD	1920 × 1080	5.0 in (130 mm)	441
Xiaomi	Mi 4	August 2014	Android 4.4.3	IPS LCD	1920 × 1080	5.0 in (130 mm)	441
Xiaomi	Mi Note	January 2015	Android 4.4.4	IPS LCD	1920 × 1080	5.7 in (140 mm)	386
Xiaomi	Mi 5	April 2016	Android 6.0	IPS LCD	1920 × 1080	5.15 in (131 mm)	428
Xiaomi	Mi Max	May 2016	Android 6.0	IPS LCD	1920 × 1080	6.44 in (164 mm)	342
Xiaomi	Mi Mix	November 2016	Android 6.0	IPS LCD	2040 × 1080	6.4 in (160 mm)	362
Xiaomi	Mi 6	April 2017	Android 7.1.1	IPS LCD	1920 × 1080	5.15 in (131 mm)	428
Xiaomi	Mi Max 2	June 2017	Android 7.1.1	IPS LCD	1920 × 1080	6.44 in (164 mm)	342
Xiaomi	Mi Mix 2	September 2017	Android 7.1	IPS LCD	2160 × 1080	6 in (150 mm)	403
Xiaomi	Mi 8	May 2018	Android 8.1	AMOLED	2244 × 1080	6.2 in (160 mm)	402
Xiaomi	Mi Max 3	July 2018	Android 8.1	IPS LCD	2160 × 1080	6.9 in (180 mm)	350
Xiaomi	Pocophone F1	August 2018	Android 9.0	IPS LCD	2246 × 1080	6.18 in (157 mm)	403
Xiaomi	Mi Mix 3	November 2018	Android 9.0	AMOLED	2340 × 1080	6.39 in (162 mm)	403
Xiaomi	Mi 9	March 2019	Android 9.0	AMOLED	2340 × 1080	6.39 in (162 mm)	403
Xiaomi	Mi CC9 Pro/Mi Note 10	November 2019	Android 9.0	AMOLED	2340 × 1080	6.47 in (164 mm)	398
Xiaomi	Mi 10/Mi 10 Pro	February 2020	Android 10.0	AMOLED	2340 × 1080	6.67 in (169 mm)	386
Xiaomi	MIX 4	August 2021	Android 11.0	AMOLED	2400 × 1080	6.67 in (169 mm)	395
Xiaomi	12/12X	December 2021	Android 12.0	OLED	2400 × 1080	6.28 in (160 mm)	419
ZOPO	ZP990 CAPTAIN S	August 2013	Android 4.2.1	IPS LCD	1920 × 1080	6.0 in (150 mm)	367
ZTE	Nubia Z5	January 2013	Android 4.1	IPS LCD	1920 × 1080	5.0 in (130 mm)	441
ZTE	Grand S	March 2013	Android 4.1	IPS LCD	1920 × 1080	5.0 in (130 mm)	441

== 1179-1320 nonstandard ==
Brand	Model	Release month	Operating system	Display type	Resolution (pixels) or px	Display size	Pixel density (ppi)
Apple Inc.	iPhone X	November 2017	iOS 11	OLED	2436 × 1125	5.85 in (149 mm)	458
Apple Inc.	iPhone XS	September 2018	iOS 12	OLED	2436 × 1125	5.85 in (149 mm)	458
Apple Inc.	iPhone XS Max	September 2018	iOS 12	OLED	2688 × 1242	6.5 in (170 mm)	458
Apple Inc.	iPhone 11 Pro	September 2019	iOS 13	OLED	2436 × 1125	5.85 in (149 mm)	458
Apple Inc.	iPhone 11 Pro Max	September 2019	iOS 13	OLED	2688 × 1242	6.5 in (170 mm)	458
Apple Inc.	iPhone 12 Pro	October 2020	iOS 14	OLED	2532 × 1170	6.1 in (150 mm)	460
Apple Inc.	iPhone 12 Pro Max	November 2020	iOS 14	OLED	2778 × 1284	6.7 in (170 mm)	458
Apple Inc.	iPhone 13 Pro	September 2021	iOS 15	OLED	2532 × 1170	6.1 in (150 mm)	460
Apple Inc.	iPhone 13 Pro Max	September 2021	iOS 15	OLED	2778 × 1284	6.7 in (170 mm)	458
Apple Inc.	iPhone 14 Pro	September 2022	iOS 16	LTPO OLED	2556 × 1179	6.1 in (150 mm)	460
Apple Inc.	iPhone 14 Pro Max	September 2022	iOS 16	LTPO OLED	2796 × 1290	6.7 in (170 mm)	460
Apple Inc.	iPhone 15 Pro	September 2023	iOS 17	LTPO OLED	2556 × 1179	6.1 in (150 mm)	460
Apple Inc.	iPhone 15 Pro Max	September 2023	iOS 17	LTPO OLED	2796 × 1290	6.7 in (170 mm)	460
Apple Inc.	iPhone 16	September 2024	iOS 18	LTPO OLED	2556 × 1179	6.1 in (150 mm)	460
Apple Inc.	iPhone 16 Plus	September 2024	iOS 18	LTPO OLED	2796 × 1290	6.7 in (170 mm)	460
Apple Inc.	iPhone 16 Pro	September 2024	iOS 18	LTPO OLED	2622 × 1206	6.3 in (160 mm)	460
Apple Inc.	iPhone 16 Pro Max	September 2024	iOS 18	LTPO OLED	2868 × 1320	6.9 in (180 mm)	460

== 1440p ==
Brand	Model	Release month	Operating system	Display type	Resolution (pixels)	Display size	Pixel density (ppi)
BlackBerry	Priv	October 2015	Android 6.0.1	AMOLED	2560 × 1440	5.4 in (140 mm)	540
Google	Pixel XL	October 2016	Android 7.1	AMOLED	2560 × 1440	5.5 in (140 mm)	534
Google	Pixel 2 XL	October 2017	Android 8.0	P-OLED	2880 × 1440	6 in (150 mm)	538
Google	Pixel 3 XL	October 2018	Android 9.0	P-OLED	2960 × 1440	6.3 in (160 mm)	522
Google	Pixel 4 XL	October 2019	Android 10.0	P-OLED	3040 × 1440	6.3 in (160 mm)	537
Google	Pixel 6 Pro	October 2021	Android 12.0	LTPO OLED	3120 × 1440	6.7 in (170 mm)	512
Google	Pixel 7 Pro	October 2022	Android 13.0	LTPO OLED	3120 × 1440	6.7 in (170 mm)	512
HTC	10	May 2016	Android 6.0.1	IPS LCD	2560 × 1440	5.2 in (130 mm)	565
HTC	U Ultra	February 2017	Android 8.0	IPS LCD	2560 × 1440	5.7 in (140 mm)	513
HTC	U11	June 2017	Android 7.1	IPS LCD	2560 × 1440	5.5 in (140 mm)	534
HTC	U12+	June 2018	Android 8.0	IPS LCD	2880 × 1440	6 in (150 mm)	537
Huawei	Nexus 6P	September 2015	Android 6.0	AMOLED	2560 × 1440	5.7 in (140 mm)	518
Huawei	Mate 9 Pro	January 2017	Android 7.0	OLED	2560 × 1440	5.5 in (140 mm)	534
Huawei	P10 Plus	April 2017	Android 7.0	IPS-NEO LCD	2560 × 1440	5.5 in (140 mm)	540
Huawei	Mate 10	October 2017	Android 8.0	IPS LCD	2560 × 1440	5.9 in (150 mm)	499
Huawei	Mate 20 Pro	October 2018	Android 9.0	OLED	3120 × 1440	6.4 in (160 mm)	537
LG	G3	May 2014	Android 4.4	IPS LCD	2560 × 1440	5.5 in (140 mm)	538
LG	G4	April 2015	Android 5.1.1	IPS LCD	2560 × 1440	5.5 in (140 mm)	538
LG	V10	October 2015	Android 5.1.1	IPS LCD	2560 × 1440	5.7 in (140 mm)	515
LG	G5	April 2016	Android 6.0	IPS LCD	2560 × 1440	5.3 in (130 mm)	554
LG	V20	October 2016	Android 7.0	IPS LCD	2560 × 1440	5.7 in (140 mm)	513
LG	G6	February 2017	Android 7.0	IPS LCD	2880 × 1440	5.7 in (140 mm)	564
LG	V30	September 2017	Android 7.1.2	P-OLED	2880 × 1440	6 in (150 mm)	537
LG	G7 ThinQ	May 2018	Android 8.0	IPS LCD	3120 × 1440	6.1 in (150 mm)	564
LG	V40 ThinQ	October 2018	Android 8.1	P-OLED	3120 × 1440	6.4 in (160 mm)	537
LG	G8 ThinQ	March 2019	Android 9.0	P-OLED	3120 × 1440	6.1 in (150 mm)	564
LG	V50 ThinQ	May 2019	Android 9.0	P-OLED	3120 × 1440	6.4 in (160 mm)	537
Microsoft	Lumia 950	November 2015	Windows 10 Mobile	AMOLED	2560 × 1440	5.2 in (130 mm)	570
Microsoft	Lumia 950 XL	November 2015	Windows 10 Mobile	AMOLED	2560 × 1440	5.7 in (140 mm)	518
Motorola	Droid Turbo	October 2014	Android 4.4	AMOLED	2560 × 1440	5.2 in (130 mm)	570
Motorola	Nexus 6	November 2014	Android 5.0	AMOLED	2560 × 1440	5.96 in (151 mm)	493
Motorola	Moto X Style	September 2015	Android 5.1.1	IPS LCD	2560 × 1440	5.7 in (140 mm)	520
Motorola	Droid Turbo 2	October 2015	Android 5.1.1	AMOLED	2560 × 1440	5.4 in (140 mm)	540
Motorola	Moto Z	September 2016	Android 6.0.1	AMOLED	2560 × 1440	5.5 in (140 mm)	535
Motorola	Moto Z2 Force	August 2017	Android 7.1.1	P-OLED	2560 × 1440	5.5 in (140 mm)	534
Nokia	8	October 2017	Android 7.1.1	IPS LCD	2560 × 1440	5.5 in (140 mm)	534
Nokia	8 Sirocco	April 2018	Android 8.0	P-OLED	2560 × 1440	5.5 in (140 mm)	534
Nokia	9 PureView	February 2019	Android 9.0	P-OLED	2880 × 1440	6 in (150 mm)	538
OnePlus	7 Pro	May 2019	Android 9.0	AMOLED	3120 × 1440	6.67 in (169 mm)	516
OnePlus	8 Pro	April 2020	Android 10.0	AMOLED	3168 × 1440	6.78 in (172 mm)	513
OnePlus	9 Pro	March 2021	Android 11.0	LTPO AMOLED	3216 × 1440	6.7 in (170 mm)	525
OnePlus	10 Pro	January 2022	Android 12.0	LTPO AMOLED	3216 × 1440	6.7 in (170 mm)	525
OnePlus	11	January 2023	Android 13.0	LTPO AMOLED	3216 × 1440	6.7 in (170 mm)	525
Oppo	Find X2/Find X2 Pro	March 2020	ColorOS 7.1	AMOLED	3168 × 1440	6.7 in (170 mm)	513
Oppo	Find X3/Find X3 Pro	March 2021	Android 11.0	LTPO AMOLED	3216 × 1440	6.7 in (170 mm)	525
Oppo	Find X5 Pro	March 2022	Android 12.0	LTPO AMOLED	3216 × 1440	6.7 in (170 mm)	525
Samsung	Galaxy Note 4	October 2014	Android 4.4	Super AMOLED	2560 × 1440	5.7 in (140 mm)	518
Samsung	Galaxy S6	April 2015	Android 5.1.1	Super AMOLED	2560 × 1440	5.1 in (130 mm)	577
Samsung	Galaxy Note 5	August 2015	Android 5.1.1	Super AMOLED	2560 × 1440	5.7 in (140 mm)	518
Samsung	Galaxy S7	March 2016	Android 6.0.1	Super AMOLED	2560 × 1440	5.1 in (130 mm)	577
Samsung	Galaxy S7 Edge	March 2016	Android 6.0.1	Super AMOLED	2560 × 1440	5.5 in (140 mm)	534
Samsung	Galaxy S8	April 2017	Android 7.0	Super AMOLED	2960 × 1440	5.8 in (150 mm)	572
Samsung	Galaxy S8+	April 2017	Android 7.0	Super AMOLED	2960 × 1440	6.2 in (160 mm)	529
Samsung	Galaxy Note 8	August 2017	Android 7.1.1	Super AMOLED	2960 × 1440	6.3 in (160 mm)	521
Samsung	Galaxy S9	March 2018	Android 8.0	Super AMOLED	2960 × 1440	5.8 in (150 mm)	572
Samsung	Galaxy S9+	March 2018	Android 8.0	Super AMOLED	2960 × 1440	6.2 in (160 mm)	529
Samsung	Galaxy Note 9	August 2018	Android 8.1	Super AMOLED	2960 × 1440	6.4 in (160 mm)	516
Samsung	Galaxy S10	March 2019	Android 9.0	Super AMOLED	3040 × 1440	6.1 in (150 mm)	550
Samsung	Galaxy S10+	March 2019	Android 9.0	Super AMOLED	3040 × 1440	6.4 in (160 mm)	526
Samsung	Galaxy Note 10+	August 2019	Android 9.0	Super AMOLED	3040 × 1440	6.8 in (170 mm)	498
Samsung	Galaxy S20	March 2020	Android 10.0	Super AMOLED	3200 × 1440	6.2 in (160 mm)	563
Samsung	Galaxy S20+	March 2020	Android 10.0	Super AMOLED	3200 × 1440	6.7 in (170 mm)	525
Samsung	Galaxy S20 Ultra	March 2020	Android 10.0	Super AMOLED	3200 × 1440	6.9 in (180 mm)	511
Samsung	Galaxy Note 20 Ultra	August 2020	Android 10.0	LTPO AMOLED	3088 × 1440	6.9 in (180 mm)	496
Samsung	Galaxy S21 Ultra	January 2021	Android 11.0	LTPO AMOLED	3200 × 1440	6.8 in (170 mm)	515
Samsung	Galaxy S22 Ultra	February 2022	Android 12.0	LTPO AMOLED	3088 × 1440	6.8 in (170 mm)	500
Samsung	Galaxy S23 Ultra	February 2023	Android 13.0	LTPO AMOLED	3088 × 1440	6.8 in (170 mm)	500
Samsung	Galaxy S24 Ultra	January 2024	Android 14.0	LTPO AMOLED	3120 × 1440	6.8 in (170 mm)	505
Sharp	Aquos Zero	January 2019	Android 9.0	OLED	2992 × 1440	6.2 in (160 mm)	536
Sony	Xperia XZ3	October 2018	Android 9.0	P-OLED	2880 × 1440	6 in (150 mm)	537
Xiaomi	Black Shark 3 Pro	March 2020	Android 10.0	AMOLED	3120 × 1440	7.1 in (180 mm)	484
Xiaomi	Mi 11	January 2021	Android 11.0	AMOLED	3200 × 1440	6.81 in (173 mm)	515
Xiaomi	12 Pro	December 2021	Android 12.0	LTPO AMOLED	3200 × 1440	6.73 in (171 mm)	521

== 2160p (4K UHD) ==
Brand	Model	Release month	Operating system	Display type	Resolution (pixels)	Display size	Pixel density (ppi)
Sony	Xperia Z5 Premium	November 2015	Android 5.1.1/6.0.1/7.0	IPS LCD	3840 × 2160	5.5 in (140 mm)	806
Sony	Xperia XZ Premium	June 2017	Android 7.1/8.0/9.0	IPS LCD	3840 × 2160	5.46 in (139 mm)	807
Sony	Xperia XZ2 Premium	July 2018	Android 8.0/9.0	IPS LCD	3840 × 2160	5.8 in (150 mm)	765

== See also ==
- List of mobile phones with WVGA (Wide Video Graphics Array) display, eg 768 x 480
- List of mobile phones with FWVGA (Full Wide VGA) display (854 x 480)
- Graphics display resolution
