= HMD 100 =

HMD feature phone

- Brand: HMD
- Manufacturer: HMD Global
- Type: Feature phone
- First released: December 8, 2025
- Related: HMD 101
- Compatible networks: 2G (GSM 900 / 1800)
- Form factor: Bar
- Dimensions: 114.3 mm (4.50 in) H 50 mm (2.0 in) W 14.3 mm (0.56 in) D
- Weight: 73 g (2.6 oz)
- CPU: Unisoc 6533G
- Memory: 8 MB RAM
- Storage: 4 MB
- Removable storage: microSD
- Battery: 800 mAh Li-Ion (removable)
- Charging: 2.75 W wired
- Rear camera: None
- Front camera: None
- Display: 1.77 in (45 mm) TFT LCD, 128 x 160 pixels (~116 ppi)
- Sound: Loudspeaker, 3.5mm jack
- Connectivity: Micro-USB, Wireless FM radio, Flashlight

The HMD 100 is a bar feature phone manufactured and branded by HMD Global. It was unveiled on December 3, 2025 along with HMD 101 and 102.

It was available at Gray, Red, and Green color options. It has a 7-day stand-by time and 6 hours of talk time with a capacity of 800 mAh.
