= Nokia G100 =

2022 smartphone model

- Brand: Nokia
- Manufacturer: HMD Global
- Type: Smartphone
- Series: Nokia G series
- First released: October 2022
- Predecessor: Nokia G50
- Compatible networks: GSM / HSPA / LTE
- Form factor: Slate
- Dimensions: 166.6×76.7×8.9 mm (6.56×3.02×0.35 in)
- Weight: 195 g (7 oz)
- Operating system: Android 12
- System-on-chip: Qualcomm Snapdragon 662 (11 nm)
- CPU: Octa-core (4×2.0 GHz Kryo 260 Gold & 4×1.8 GHz Kryo 260 Silver)
- GPU: Adreno 610
- Memory: 3 GB / 4 GB RAM
- Storage: 32 GB / 64 GB / 128 GB
- Removable storage: microSDXC (dedicated slot)
- Battery: 5000 mAh, non-removable Li-Po
- Charging: 10W wired
- Rear camera: Triple: 13 MP (wide) + 5 MP (ultrawide) + 2 MP (depth), LED flash
- Front camera: 8 MP
- Display: 6.52 in (166 mm) IPS LCD, 720 × 1600 pixels (~269 ppi)
- Sound: Loudspeaker, 3.5 mm headphone jack
- Connectivity: Wi-Fi 802.11 a/b/g/n/ac, Bluetooth 5.0, GPS, USB-C 2.0
- Model: TA-1430 (varies by region)

The Nokia G100 is a Nokia-branded Android One smartphone that was manufactured by HMD Global. It was announced on 22 September 2022 and released in October 2022 as part of Nokia's G-series lineup.

== Specifications ==
=== Hardware ===
The phone is powered by a Qualcomm Snapdragon 662 system-on-chip with an octa-core CPU and Adreno 610 GPU, paired with 3 GB or 4 GB of RAM and 32 GB to 128 GB of internal storage expandable via microSDXC.

=== Display ===
The device features a 6.52-inch IPS LCD display with a resolution of 720 × 1600 pixels.
