= HMD Touch 4G =

Hybrid fearture phone manufactured by HMD Global

- Brand: HMD
- Manufacturer: HMD Global
- Type: Feature phone (Hybrid)
- First released: October 7, 2025
- Availability by region: October 2025
- Compatible networks: GSM, WCDMA, LTE
- Form factor: Bar
- Colors: Cyan, Dark Blue
- Dimensions: 102.3 mm (4.03 in) H 61.85 mm (2.435 in) W 10.85 mm (0.427 in) D
- Weight: 100 g (3.5 oz)
- Operating system: RTOS (RTOS Touch)
- CPU: Unisoc T127
- Memory: 64 MB RAM
- Storage: 128 MB
- Removable storage: microSDHC (up to 32 GB)
- Battery: 1950 mAh Li-ion (removable)
- Rear camera: 2 MP with LED flash
- Front camera: 0.3 MP
- Display: 3.2 in (81 mm) TFT LCD touchscreen Resolution: QVGA (240 x 320 pixels), 4:3 ratio (~125 ppi)
- Sound: Loudspeaker, 3.5 mm jack
- Connectivity: Wi-Fi 4 (802.11 b/g/n), Bluetooth 5.0, GPS, USB-C
- Water resistance: IP52 dust and splash protection
- Model: TA-1692

The HMD Touch 4G is a hybrid feature phone branded and manufactured by HMD Global, which includes 4G LTE connectivity. It was unveiled on October 7, 2025 and also the firsi hybrid phone to be developed. In India, it was priced at 3,999 rupees.

It runs on RTOS Touch that consumers can use the connectivity softwares: Cloud Phone Service for accessibility to live cricket updates, weather updates, social, etc. and Express Chat. It also has expandable storage up to 32GB via microSD, 3.2-inch LCD with QVGA resolution, IP52 ressistance, rear camera, and a USB-C charging port.
