= HMD Luma =

Entry-level smartphone with 50MP main camera

- Brand: HMD
- Manufacturer: HMD Global
- Type: Smartphone
- First released: February 27, 2026; 6 months ago
- Availability by region: March 2026: Nigeria; Ghana
- Compatible networks: 2G, 3G, 4G LTE
- Form factor: Slate
- Colors: Titanium; Blue
- Dimensions: 165.7 mm (6.52 in) H 76.5 mm (3.01 in) W 8.65 mm (0.341 in) D
- Weight: 197.9 g (6.98 oz)
- Operating system: Android 15
- System-on-chip: Unisoc T615
- CPU: Octa-core (2x1.8 GHz Cortex-A75 & 6x1.6 GHz Cortex-A55)
- GPU: Mali-G57 MP1
- Memory: 4 GB
- Storage: 128 GB or 256 GB
- Removable storage: microSD up to 1 TB
- Battery: 5,000 mAh (18W charging)
- Rear camera: 50 MP, LED flash Video: 1080p @ 30fps
- Front camera: 8 MP; Video: 1080p @ 30fps
- Display: 6.67 in IPS LCD (169 mm) HD+ (720*1604); 120Hz refresh rate, 500 nits
- Sound: Dual speakers, 3.5 mm headphone jack, FM Radio
- Connectivity: Wi-Fi 5 (802.11a/b/g/n/ac), Bluetooth 5.0, USB-C 2.0, GPS, GLONASS, BeiDou, Galileo
- Data inputs: Side-mounted fingerprint sensor, accelerometer, ambient light sensor, proximity sensor
- Model: S686HZS0611G20

The HMD Luma is a budget entry-level Android smartphone manufactured and developed by HMD Global. It was released in March 2026 in Nigeria and Ghana and was available at Titanium and Blue colors and a large storage.

== Specifications ==
=== Design ===
The front is made of glass and the frame and the back is made of plastic. It has a rounded square camera island at the top left with a single camera.

=== Hardware ===
The Luma is powered by a Unisoc T615 chipset, an octa-core composed of two Cortex-A75 cores and six Cortex-A55 cores, and a Mali-G57 MP1 graphics processor.

It has an internal storage of 128 or 256 gigabytes and 4 gigabytes of RAM. It also has an expandable storage up to 1 terabyte with the microSD card. The Luma is housed by a 5,000 mAh battery with 18W chariging support.

=== Display ===
It has a 6.67-inch IPS LCD display with 120 Hz refresh rate, an HD+ (720 × 1604 pixels) resolution, and a 20:9 aspect ratio, with a circular punch hole in the center top, which is the front camera.

=== Cameras ===
It was equipped with a 50-megapixel main camera with wide view and LED flash and an 8-megapixel front camera. Both cameras record at 1080p @ 30fps.

=== Software ===
The HMD Luma runs on Android 15.
