= Nokia 1 =

Nokia-branded entry-level smartphone

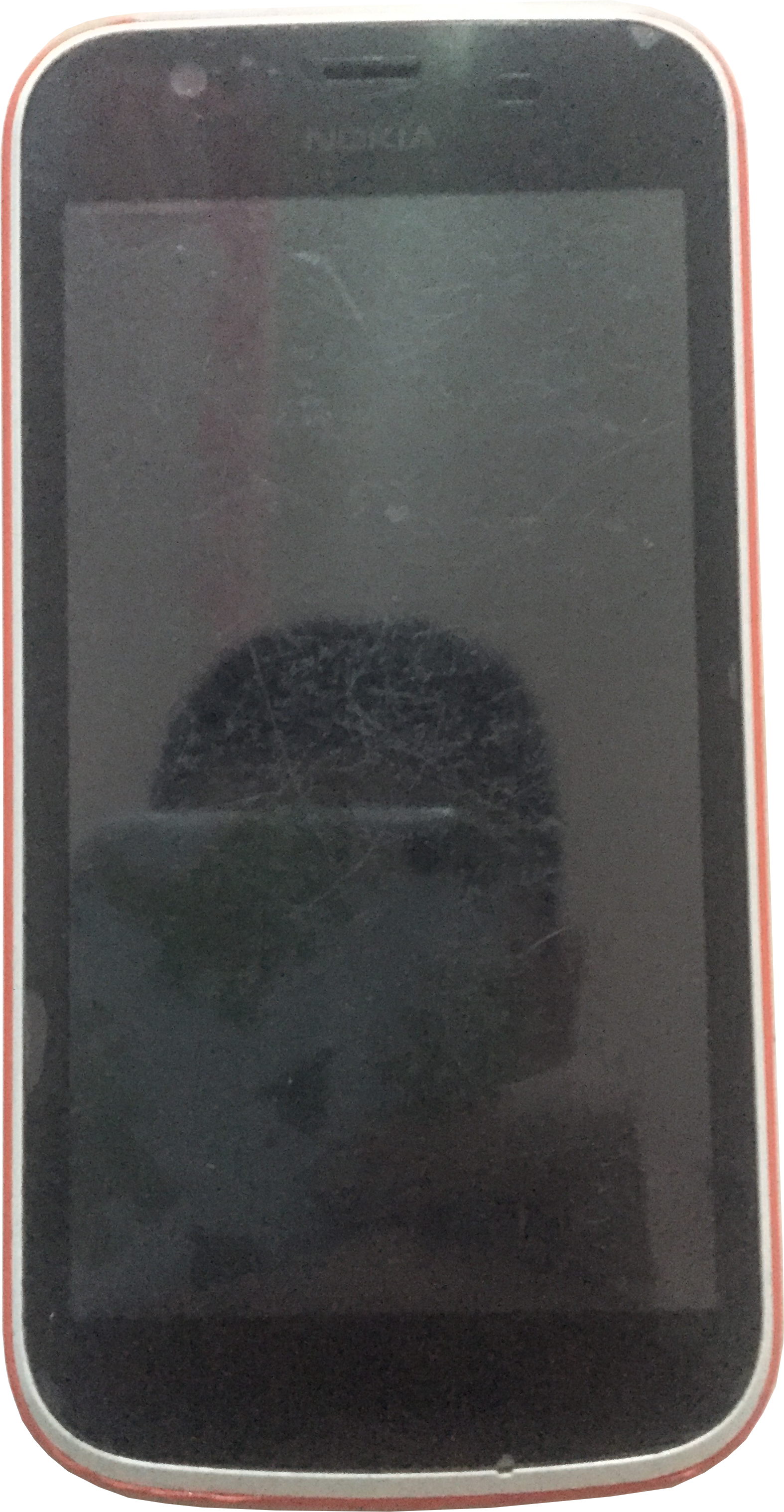
- Brand: Nokia
- Developer: HMD Global
- Manufacturer: Foxconn
- Type: Smartphone
- Discontinued: 28 October 2019; 7 years ago
- Predecessor: Nokia Asha 230
- Successor: Nokia 1 Plus
- Related: Nokia 2 Nokia 3 Nokia 5 Nokia 6 Nokia 7 Nokia 8
- Colors: Warm Red, Dark Blue
- Dimensions: 133.6×67.78×9.5 mm (5.260×2.669×0.374 in)
- Weight: 131 g (5 oz) (including battery)
- Operating system: Original: Android 8.1 "Oreo"; Current: Android 10 (Android Go)
- System-on-chip: MediaTek MT6737M
- CPU: Quad-core 1.1 GHz ARM Cortex-A53
- GPU: Mali-T720
- Memory: 1 GB LPDDR3 RAM
- Storage: 8 GB eMMC
- Removable storage: microSD up to 128GB
- Battery: User-removable, 2150 mAh; Standby: up to 15 days Talk time: up to 9 hours
- Rear camera: 5 MP with auto-focus and an LED flash
- Front camera: 2 MP with fixed-focus lens
- Display: 4.5 in (110 mm); 854x480 px FWVGA IPS; 16:9 aspect ratio
- Sound: Mono speaker, 3.5 mm stereo audio jack
- Media: FM radio Playback formats: 3G2, 3GP, AAC, AMR, M4A, MKV, MP3, MP4
- Connectivity: Wi-Fi 802.11 b/g/n, Bluetooth® 4.2, GPS/AGPS + cellular and Wi-Fi positioning
- Other: Dust and drip protection (IP52)
- Website: www.hmd.com/en_int/nokia-1-0

The Nokia 1 is a Nokia-branded budget Android Go smartphone, developed by HMD Global. It was launched at the Mobile World Congress 2018, in Barcelona, Spain on 25 February 2018. This device, along with the Nokia 8 Sirocco, completes the lineup of Nokia-branded Android devices. The phone also has separately sold removable back covers marketed as Xpress-on, a trade-name that first appeared on the Nokia 5110. This was the first time the Xpress-on name was used since the Nokia Lumia 710 in 2012.

== Specifications ==
=== Hardware ===
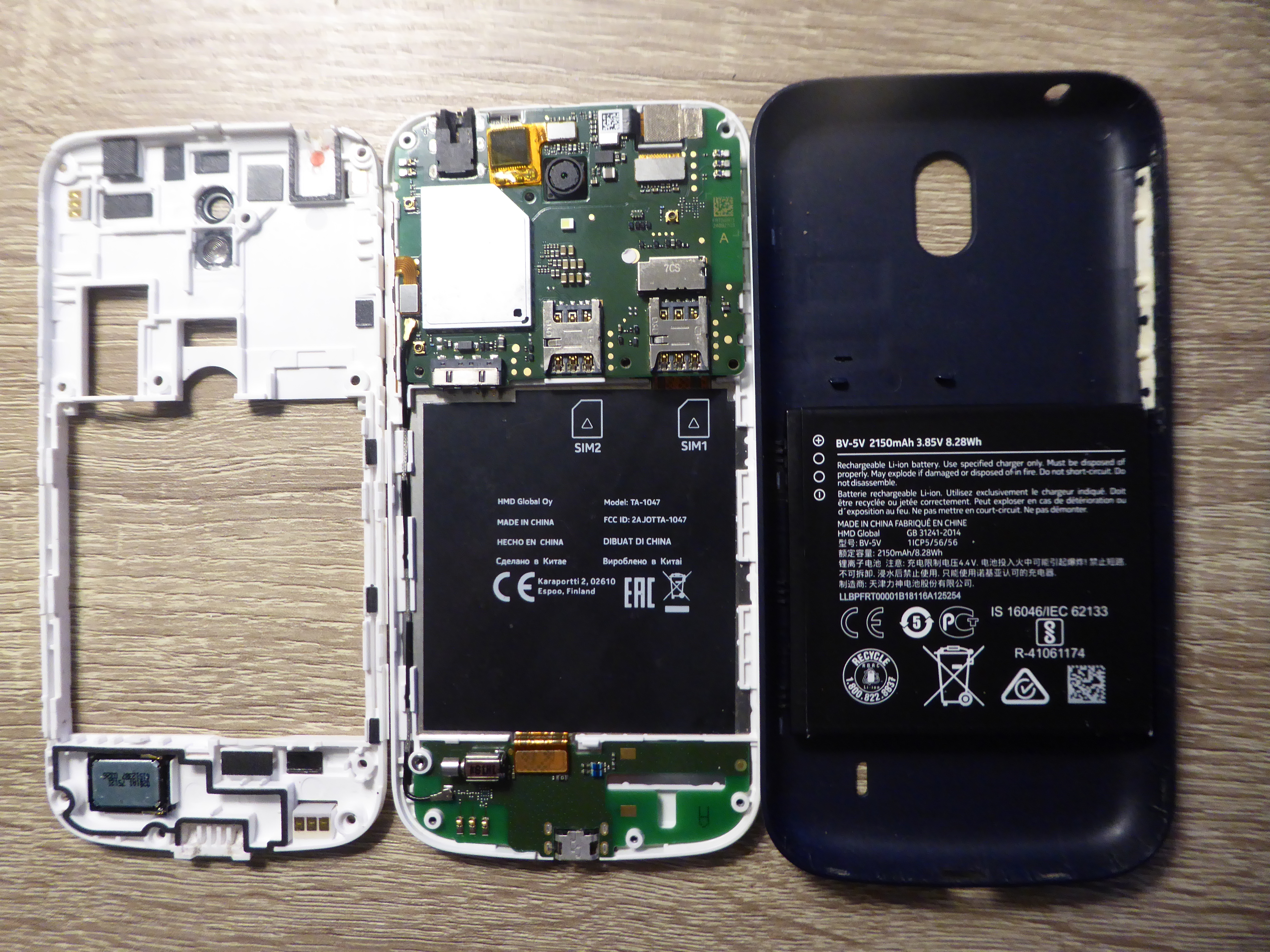
Nokia 1 open

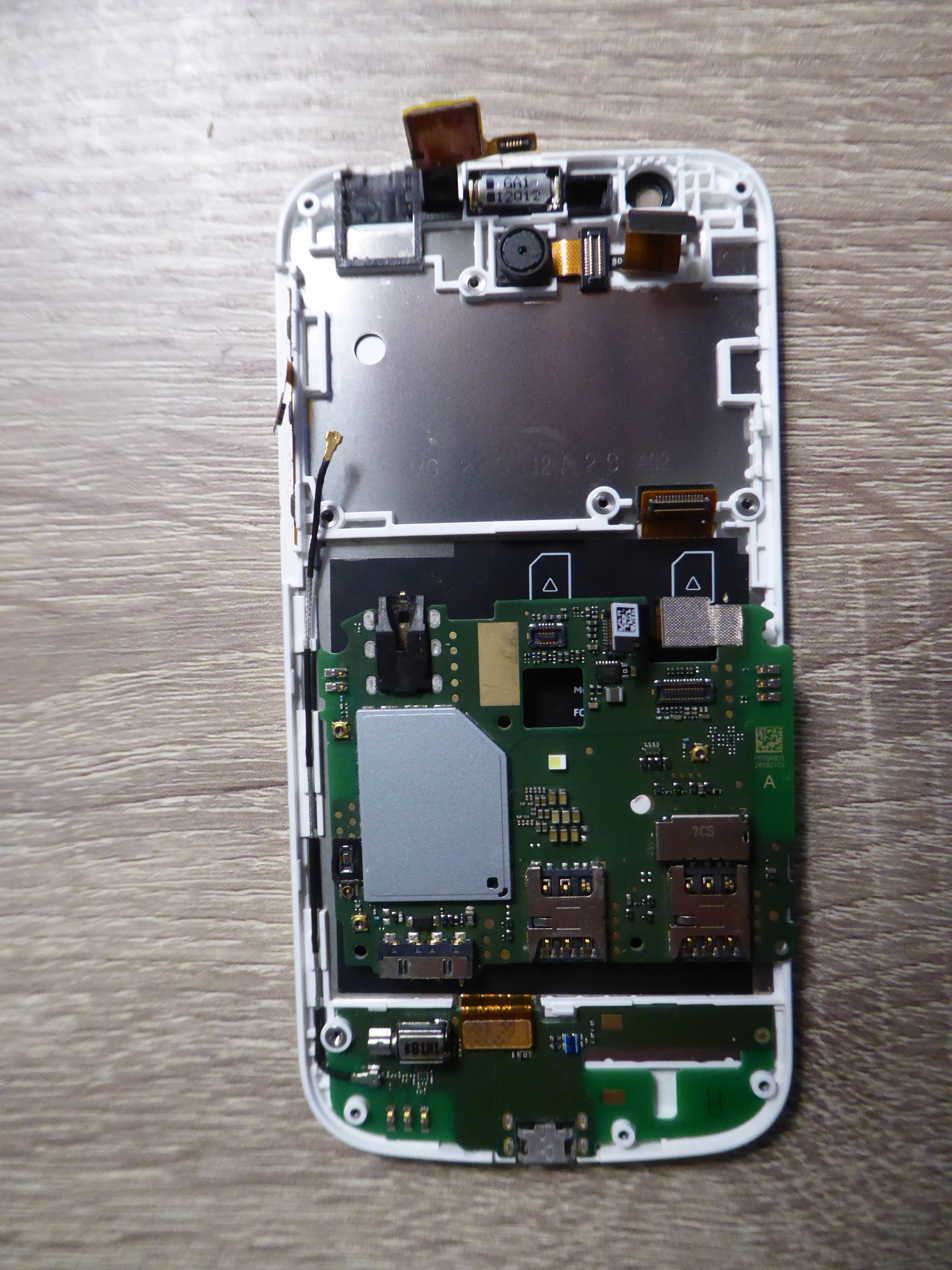
Nokia 1 internal board

The Nokia 1 has a quad-core 1.1 GHz Cortex-A53 Mediatek MT6737M CPU with 1 GB of RAM and 8 GB of internal storage that can be expanded using a microSD card of up to 128 GB.

The device also has a 4.5-inch IPS LCD, a 5 MP rear camera with auto-focus and an LED flash, and a 2 MP front-facing camera.

The 2150 mAh user-removable Li-ion battery allows for up to 15 days of standby time and up to 9 hours of talk time. The smartphone's back covers are available in Warm Red, Dark Blue, and light blue colors.

=== Software ===
The Nokia 1 is shipped with Android 8.1 Oreo (Go edition), and got continuous security updates every month for up to 3 years.

In late June 2019, HMD began rolling out the Android 9 Pie (Go edition) for Nokia 1. The Android 10 (Go edition) was rolled out to the Nokia 1.

== Reception ==
The Nokia 1 generally received mixed reviews. Sean Cameron of TechRadar praised the device's battery life, customisable back cover and durable design, while criticising its poor performance, dim screen and poor speaker.
