= Nokia 2 =

Nokia-branded low-end Android smartphone

- Brand: Nokia
- Developer: HMD Global
- Manufacturer: Foxconn
- Type: Smartphone
- First released: October 31, 2017; 8 years ago
- Predecessor: Nokia X2 (2014)
- Successor: Nokia 2.1
- Related: Nokia 1 Nokia 3 Nokia 5 Nokia 6 Nokia 7 Nokia 8
- Dimensions: 143.5 mm (5.65 in) H 71.3 mm (2.81 in) W 9.3 mm (0.37 in) D
- Weight: 161 g (5.7 oz)
- Operating system: Original: Android 7.1.1 "Nougat"; Current: Android 8.1 "Oreo"
- System-on-chip: Qualcomm Snapdragon 212
- CPU: Quad core 1.3GHz ARM Cortex A7
- GPU: Qualcomm Adreno 304 GPU
- Memory: 1 GB LPDDR3
- Storage: 8 GB eMMC 4.5
- Removable storage: microSD, up to 256 GB
- Battery: Non-removable 4100 mAh Li-ion battery
- Rear camera: 8 MP autofocus with LED flash
- Front camera: 5 MP
- Display: 5.0 in (13 cm) diagonal IPS LCD, with scratch-resistant Corning Gorilla Glass; 1280x720 px 16:9 aspect ratio
- Sound: 3.5 mm jack, single speaker
- Connectivity: Micro USB (USB 2.0), Wi-Fi (802.11 b/g/n), Bluetooth 4.1
- Data inputs: Multi-touch screen Accelerometer; Ambient light sensor Digital Compass; Proximity sensor

The Nokia 2 is a Nokia-branded budget Android smartphone by HMD Global. It was announced on 31 October 2017.

== Specifications ==
=== Hardware ===
The Nokia 2 has a 5.0-inch LTPS IPS LCD, a quad-core 1.3 GHz Cortex-A7 Qualcomm Snapdragon 212 processor, 1 GB of RAM and 8 GB of internal storage that can be expanded using microSD cards up to 128 GB. The phone features a 4100 mAh battery, and is claimed to have two-day battery life. The device has an 8 MP rear camera with LED flash, and a 5 MP front-facing camera. It is available in pewter and black, pewter and white, and copper and black colours.

=== Software ===
The Nokia 2 launched with Android 7.1.1 Nougat, and can be upgraded to Android 8.1 Oreo. In June 2019, HMD stated they would not be updating the phone to Android 9 Pie, because the System-on-Chip which it runs on, is not powerful enough to offer satisfactory performance with Android Pie.

== Reception ==
The Nokia 2 received mixed reviews. Andrew Williams of TechRadar praised the phone's battery life and pricing, while criticising the slow performance, poor cameras, and limited storage.
