= Nokia 3 =

Nokia-branded entry-level Android smartphone

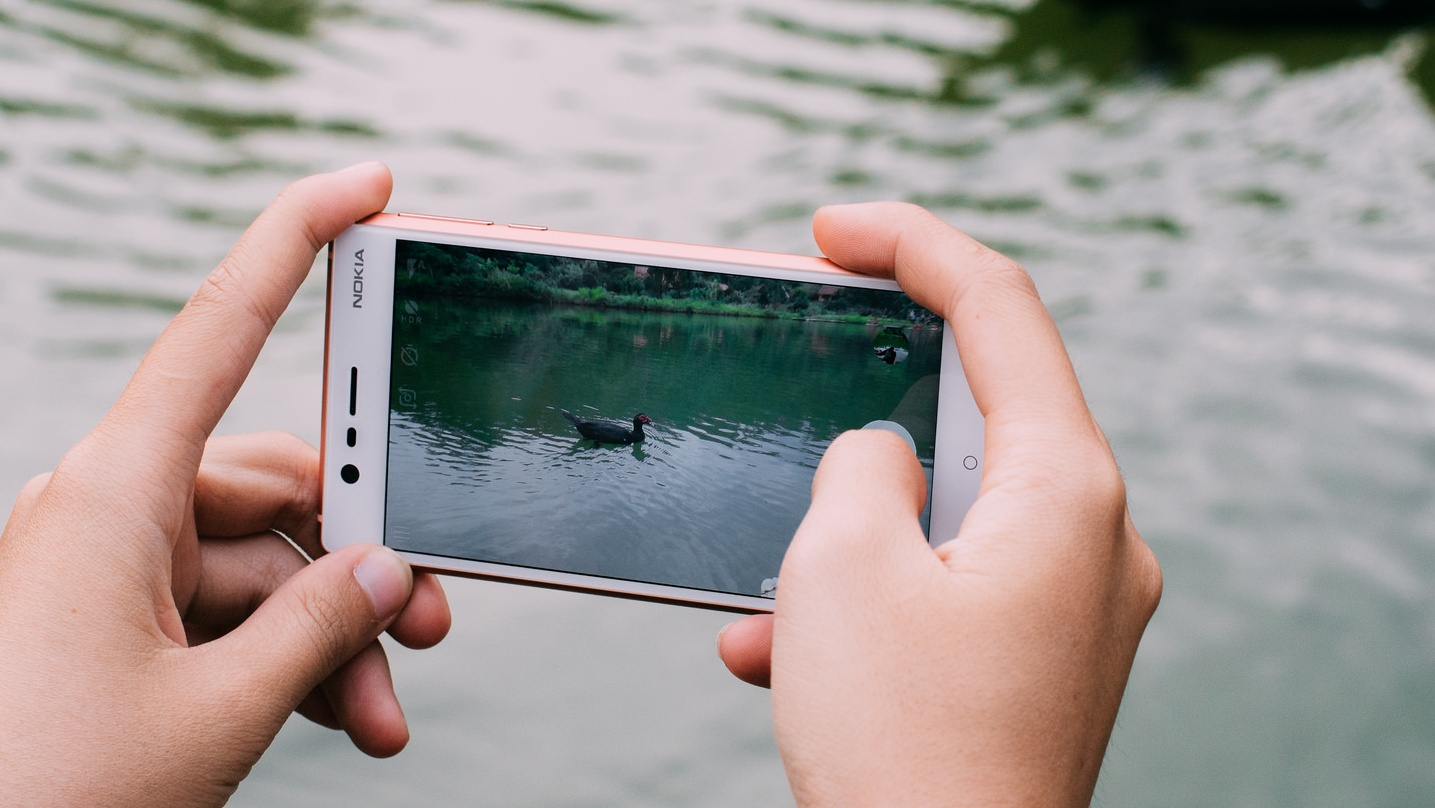
- Brand: Nokia
- Developer: HMD Global
- Manufacturer: Foxconn
- Type: Smartphone
- Family: Single digit Series
- First released: 13 June 2017; 9 years ago
- Discontinued: 9 September 2020; 6 years ago
- Successor: Nokia 3.1
- Related: Nokia 1 Nokia 2 Nokia 5 Nokia 6 Nokia 7 Nokia 8
- Dimensions: 143.4 mm (5.65 in) H 71.4 mm (2.81 in) W 8.48 mm (0.334 in) D 8.68 mm (0.342 in) D (including camera bump)
- Weight: 140 g (4.9 oz)
- Operating system: Original: Android 7.1.1 "Nougat"; Current: Android 9 "Pie"
- System-on-chip: MediaTek MT6737
- CPU: Quad-core 1.3 GHz Cortex-A53
- GPU: Mali-T720MP1
- Memory: 2 GB LPDDR3 RAM
- Storage: 16 GB eMMC 5.0
- Removable storage: microSDXC, expandable up to 256 GB
- Battery: 2,630 mAh Non-removable Li-ion
- Rear camera: 8 MP AF, 1.12 μm pixel size, f/2 aperture, LED Flash, 1280x720 (720p) 30 fps video
- Front camera: 8 MP AF, 1.12 μm, f/2 aperture, FOV 84 degrees, 1280x720 (720p) 30 fps video
- Display: 5.0 in (130 mm) diagonal IPS LCD, with scratch-resistant Corning Gorilla Glass; 1280x720 px 16:9 aspect ratio
- Sound: 3.5 mm jack Single speaker
- Connectivity: Micro USB (USB 2.0), USB OTG, Wi-Fi, Bluetooth, NFC
- Data inputs: Multi-touch screen Accelerometer; Ambient light sensor Digital Compass; Gyroscope; Proximity sensor

The Nokia 3 is a Nokia-branded entry-level Android smartphone designed and marketed by HMD Global. It was announced on 26 February 2017, a day before the Mobile World Congress started, along with the Nokia 6, Nokia 5, and Nokia 3310 (2017). The phone initially received regular monthly security updates and runs stock Android. Nokia 3.1 and others released after Nokia 3.

== Specifications ==
=== Hardware ===
The Nokia 3 has a polycarbonate back shell with a metal frame; a similar styling to the Nokia Lumia 925.

The Nokia 3 has a 5.0-inch IPS LCD, MediaTek MT6737 system on a chip with a quad-core 1.25 GHz Cortex-A53 CPU, 2 GB of RAM, 16 GB of internal storage that can be expanded using a microSD card up to 256 GB, 2630 mAh Li-ion battery, 8 MP rear camera with LED flash and 8 MP front-facing camera with auto-focus. It is available in silver white, matte black, tempered blue and copper white colours.

=== Software ===
The Nokia 3 launched with Android Nougat 7.1.1 and can be updated to Android Pie 9.0., In 2018 HMD Global stated all their first generation Nokia phones would have one more year of Android updates.

On December 20, 2018, HMD Global released a software update to Android Oreo 8.1. On June 3, 2019, HMD Global released the update to Android Pie 9.0.

== Release ==
The Nokia 3 was released in India on 13 June 2017. It was released in United Kingdom on 12 July 2017.

== Reception ==
The Nokia 3, just like the Nokia 1 and Nokia 2, received mixed reviews. James Peckam of TechRadar praised the phone's "solid build quality and premium design", remarkably low price and use of "stock Android”"software, while criticising the poor performance and battery life.

Andrew Hoyle of CNET also appreciated the device's cheap but good design and criticised its lack of processing power. TrustedReviews praised the "great software, low price and battery life that will get you through the day", while criticising the terrible performance, "bad display" and "unreliable camera".
