= Nokia 8 =

Nokia-branded high-end Android smartphone

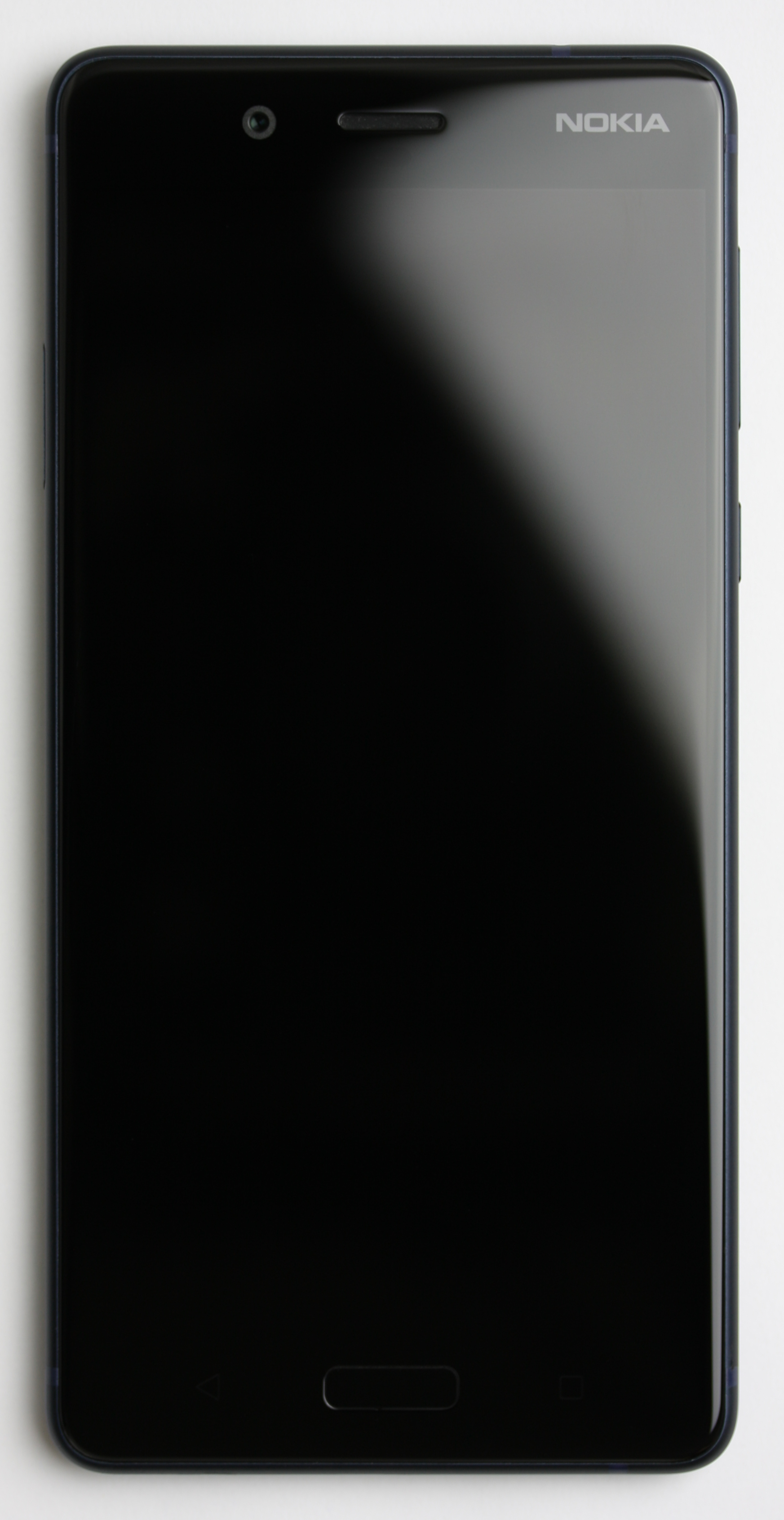
- Brand: Nokia
- Developer: HMD Global
- Manufacturer: Foxconn
- Type: Smartphone
- Discontinued: 1 January 2022; 4 years ago
- Predecessor: Nokia Lumia 930 (Nokia Flagship); Nokia 7
- Successor: Nokia 8 Sirocco; Nokia 8.1
- Related: Nokia 1 Nokia 2 Nokia 3 Nokia 5 Nokia 6 Nokia 7 Plus
- Dimensions: 151.5 mm × 73.7 mm × 7.9 mm (5.96 in × 2.90 in × 0.31 in)
- Weight: 160 g (5.64 oz)
- Operating system: Original: Android 7.1.1 "Nougat"; Current: 9.0 "Pie" (without Treble)
- System-on-chip: Qualcomm Snapdragon 835 (10 nm)
- CPU: Octa-core (4x2.5 GHz Kryo & 4x1.8 GHz Kryo)
- GPU: Adreno 540
- Memory: 4 or 6 GB LPDDR4 RAM
- Storage: 64 or 128 GB
- Removable storage: microSD, up to 256 GB
- Battery: 3090 mAh Li-Po, non-removable
- Rear camera: Dual Camera Set-up: 13 MP (f/2.0, 1/3.1", 1.12 μm, PDAF, laser autofocus, OIS); 13 MP B/W (f/2.0, 1.12 μm, PDAF); ZEISS optics, dual-LED dual-tone flash, HDR, panorama Video: 4K@30fps, 1080p@30fps
- Front camera: 13 MP (f/2.0, 1/3.1", 1.12 μm, PDAF) Wide; Video: 4K
- Display: 5.3 in (13 cm) (77.4 cm^{2}) 1440p QHD 2.5D curved IPS LCD with Gorilla Glass 5 protection, ~554 ppi pixel density
- Sound: Bottom mounted loud speaker, Nokia OZO 360° audio (For Recording Video Only), Dolby Atmos compatible decoding, active noise cancellation with dedicated microphone
- Connectivity: LTE-A download 1000 Mbit/s upload 150 Mbit/s; 3.5 mm TRRS headphone jack; Bluetooth 5.0; USB 3.1 via USB-C port; NFC
- Data inputs: Sensors: Fingerprint scanner (front-mounted); Accelerometer; Gyroscope; Proximity sensor; Electronic compass; Hall sensor; Barometer
- Model: TA-1004
- Other: IP54 dust and splash resistance

The Nokia 8 is a flagship Nokia-branded smartphone running the Android operating system. Announced on 16 August 2017 in London, England by HMD Global. The phone began sales in Europe in September 2017. Nokia 8 is the first high-end Nokia-branded device since the Nokia Lumia 930 in 2014. An improved version, the Nokia 8 Sirocco, was announced on 25 February 2018 at the Mobile World Congress in Barcelona.

== Specifications ==
=== Design ===
The Nokia 8 has a 5.3-inch display and averages 7.3 mm thick and 4.3 mm thick at the edges. It is available in four colors: Polished Blue, Polished Copper, Tempered Blue, and Steel. The device features a full-length graphite-shielded copper cooling pipe for efficient cooling. The phone is not water-resistant, but is IP54 splash-resistant.

=== Hardware ===
The Nokia 8 comes with the Qualcomm Snapdragon 835 CPU, backed by either 4 or 6 GB of RAM and 64 GB of internal storage (Tempered Blue, Steel, and Polished Copper-coloured models), or 6 GB of RAM and 128 GB of internal storage (Polished Blue). Both are expandable with microSD cards. The QHD display is protected by Gorilla Glass 5. The device has a USB-C port and a 3.5mm headphone jack.

==== Cameras and multimedia ====
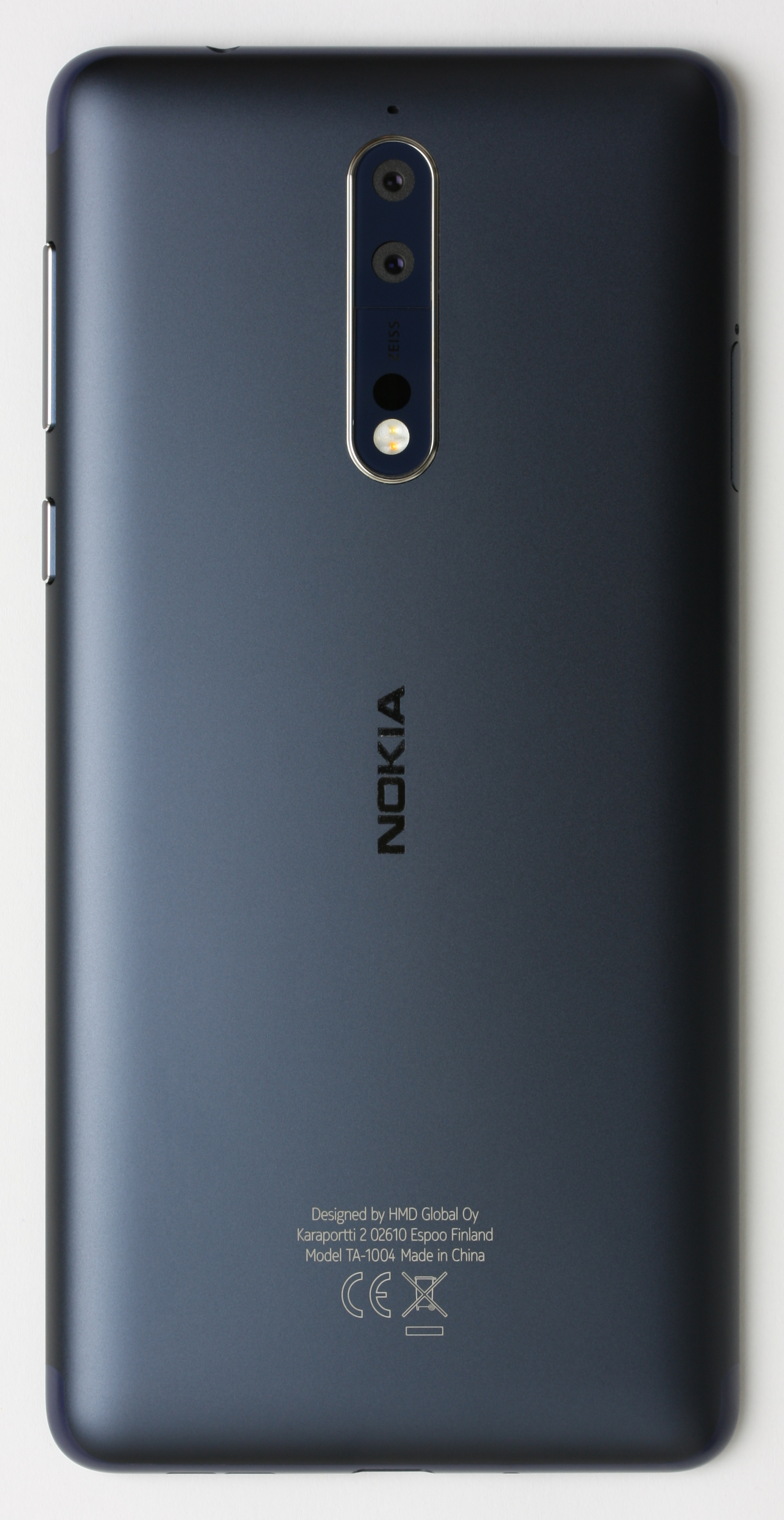
The backside of the Nokia 8 with camera

The Nokia 8 is the first Nokia-branded phone to feature a dual-lens camera system. The rear camera module includes a set of two 13 MP sensors, of which one is an RGB sensor, and the other a monochrome sensor. The rear camera is equipped with optical image stabilization (OIS), f/2.0 aperture, PDAF, an IR rangefinder, and a dual-LED flash.

The front and rear cameras' combined standout feature is an advanced dualphotographic image camera (rebranded "Bothie" by Nokia), where the cameras can be used simultaneously by dividing the screen into a split-image setup, a technology Nokia calls Dual-Sight mode. Both the front and main cameras use ZEISS optics.

Video recording can be done in resolutions of 2160p at 30fps (4K) and 1080p at 30fps (FHD), with single-touch live streaming to social networks. The cellphone contains several microphones able to record spatial audio 360° with binaural audio codecs, providing high fidelity playback through OZO Audio technology, which was derived from the Nokia OZO camera. The phone is equipped with a single bottom mounted loudspeaker, so is not fully Dolby Atmos compatible.

These audio outputs use OZO spatial audio playback to produce high quality 360° surround sound from stereo speakers (or ear buds) and use decoding standards compatible with Dolby Atmos and other earlier surround sound standards.

=== Software ===
==== Stock Android ====
Like the Nokia 3, Nokia 5 and Nokia 6, the device ran a near-stock version of Android 7.1.1 Nougat on release. One difference is the camera mobile app, so as to cater for the phone's Dual-Sight feature. It also comes with an always-on display, similar to Nokia's previous Glance Screen on the Nokia Lumia series.

On 24 November 2017, HMD started rolling out a partial (excluding the Treble feature for device independent system updates) software upgrade to Android 8.0 Oreo. The main rollout was phased over two days, however some network operators released the software upgrade in the following weeks.

On 13 February 2018, Nokia released Android 8.1 Oreo for the Nokia 8.

On 27 September 2018, it was announced that the Nokia 8's bootloader could be unlocked.

On 19 December 2018, Android 9.0 Pie was released for the Nokia 8.

==== Custom ROMs ====
The Nokia 8, codename "NB1", allows for bootloader unlocking and custom ROM installs, and as a result the phone can be updated to Android 15 with the degoogled lineageOS, crDroid or LineageOS with microG.

== Reception ==
The Nokia 8 generally received positive reviews.

James Peckham of TechRadar praised the device for its "beautiful design, especially with shiny effect, dual-sensor rear camera with interesting software, and gorgeous QHD display", while criticising the "lack of unique features, slightly higher price and lack of waterproofing".

Andrew Lanxon of CNET praised the performance and battery, while criticising the "lack of some cutting-edge features for a high-end phone in 2017, like waterproofing and a slim, standout design".

Rehan Hooda of Firstpost praised the software, display and performance, while criticising the camera.
