= Acer CloudMobile S500 =

Smartphone manufactured by Acer Inc.

- Manufacturer: Acer Inc.
- Type: Smartphone
- Series: S
- First released: September 2012
- Compatible networks: GSM 850 MHz/900 MHz/1800 MHz/1900 MHz; HSDPA 43.2 Mbit/s 900 MHz / 1900 MHz / 2100 MHz
- Form factor: Slate
- Dimensions: 127 mm (5.0 in) H 658 mm (25.9 in) W 9.9 mm (0.39 in) D
- Weight: 125 g (4.4 oz) (battery included)
- Operating system: Android 4.0.4 (Ice Cream Sandwich)
- System-on-chip: Qualcomm MSM8260A S4
- CPU: Krait Dual-core 1.5 GHz
- GPU: Adreno 225
- Memory: 1 GB
- Storage: 8 GB
- Removable storage: microSD (supports up to 32 GB)
- Battery: 1460 mAh; Internal Rechargeable Li-ion; User replaceable
- Rear camera: 8-megapixel auto focus with LED flash
- Front camera: 0.9-megapixel HD
- Display: IPS LCD 4.3", ~342 ppi, 720×1280 pixels, 16M colors
- Media: Audio MP3/WAV/WMA/eAAC+ Video DivX/XviD/MP4/H.264/H.263
- Connectivity: 3.5 mm jack Bluetooth v4.0 with A2DP Mono FM Radio with RDS micro USB 2.0 802.11 (b/g/n)
- Data inputs: Capacitive touchscreen NFC
- SAR: 1.25
- Other: Dolby Mobile sound enhancement, Android Beam, AcerCloud

Acer CloudMobile S500 is an Android smartphone that was announced in February 2012 and released in September 2012. The Acer CloudMobile S500 tech specifications includes a 4.3 inch IPS Display, Krait dual-core processor running at 1.5 GHz with 1 GB of RAM, 8 MP rear camera and a front-facing HD camera for video calls, face unlock or self-portrait photography. The device runs Android 4.0.4 (Ice Cream Sandwich), and it is 97% vanilla OS, has only minor modifications on drop-down notifications and on the slide to unlock.
