= Nokia 7 =

Nokia-branded midrange Android smartphone

- Brand: Nokia
- Developer: HMD Global
- Manufacturer: Foxconn
- Type: Smartphone
- First released: 24 October 2017; 8 years ago
- Discontinued: 18 August 2021; 4 years ago
- Successor: Nokia 7 Plus
- Related: Nokia 1; Nokia 2; Nokia 3; Nokia 5; Nokia 6; Nokia 8
- Dimensions: 141.2 mm × 71.5 mm × 7.9 mm (5.56 in × 2.81 in × 0.31 in)
- Weight: 153 g (5.4 oz)
- Operating system: Original: Android 7.1.1 "Nougat"; Current: Android 9 "Pie"
- System-on-chip: Qualcomm Snapdragon 630 (14 nm)
- CPU: Octa-core 2.2 GHz Cortex-A53
- GPU: Adreno 508
- Memory: 4 or 6 GB RAM
- Storage: 64 GB
- Removable storage: microSD, up to 256 GB
- Battery: Non-removable, 3000 mAh Li-ion
- Rear camera: 16 MP, (f/1.8, 1.12 μm, PDAF); ZEISS optics, dual-LED dual-tone flash, panorama, HDR; Video: 4K@30fps, 1080p@30fps
- Front camera: 5 MP, (f/2.0, 1/4.0", 1.4 μm), autofocus Video: 1080p@30fps
- Display: 5.2 in (13 cm) (74.5 cm^{2}) 1080p IPS LCD with Gorilla Glass 3 protection, ~424 ppi pixel density
- Connectivity: 3.5 mm TRRS headphone jack; Bluetooth 5.0; USB 3.1 via USB-C port
- Data inputs: Sensors: Fingerprint scanner (rear-mounted); Accelerometer; Gyroscope; Proximity sensor; Electronic compass; Hall sensor
- Model: TA-1041
- Codename: HMD C1N
- Other: NFC, IP54 dust and splash resistance

The Nokia 7 is a mid-range Nokia-branded smartphone running Android, by HMD Global. It was launched on 19 October 2017 and was released on 24 October exclusively in China.

The device's successor, the Nokia 7 Plus, was announced on 25 February 2018.

== Specifications ==
=== Hardware ===
The Nokia 7 uses the mid-range Snapdragon 630, backed by either 4 or 6 GB of LPDDR4 RAM. It comes only a 64 GB variant, although storage is expandable by microSD.

The phone has a 16 MP rear camera with a f/1.8 aperture and ZEISS optics. It is the second Nokia phone to feature the "Bothie" camera mode, where both front and rear cameras can be used for recording simultaneously by dividing the screen into a split-image setup, a technology Nokia calls as "Dual-Sight" mode. The front camera is a 5 MP lens with f/2.0.

It has a "3D glass curvature back", while the frame is 7000 series aluminum with diamond cut beveled edges. The Nokia 7 comes in two colour options: Gloss Black and Matte White.

Like other HMD Global smartphones, it retains the 3.5mm headphone jack, while also having 18W fast charging for its 3,000 mAh battery, through the USB-C port. It has a rear-mounted fingerprint scanner and is IP54 dust and water resistant.

=== Software ===
The Nokia 7 was initially launched with near-stock Android 7.1.1 Nougat. HMD released the upgrade to Android 8.1 Oreo in May 2018 and Android 9 Pie on 11 December 2018.

== See also ==
- Nokia X7-00
- Nokia Lumia 730
- Nokia Lumia 735
