= Nokia 5 =

Nokia-branded midrange Android smartphone

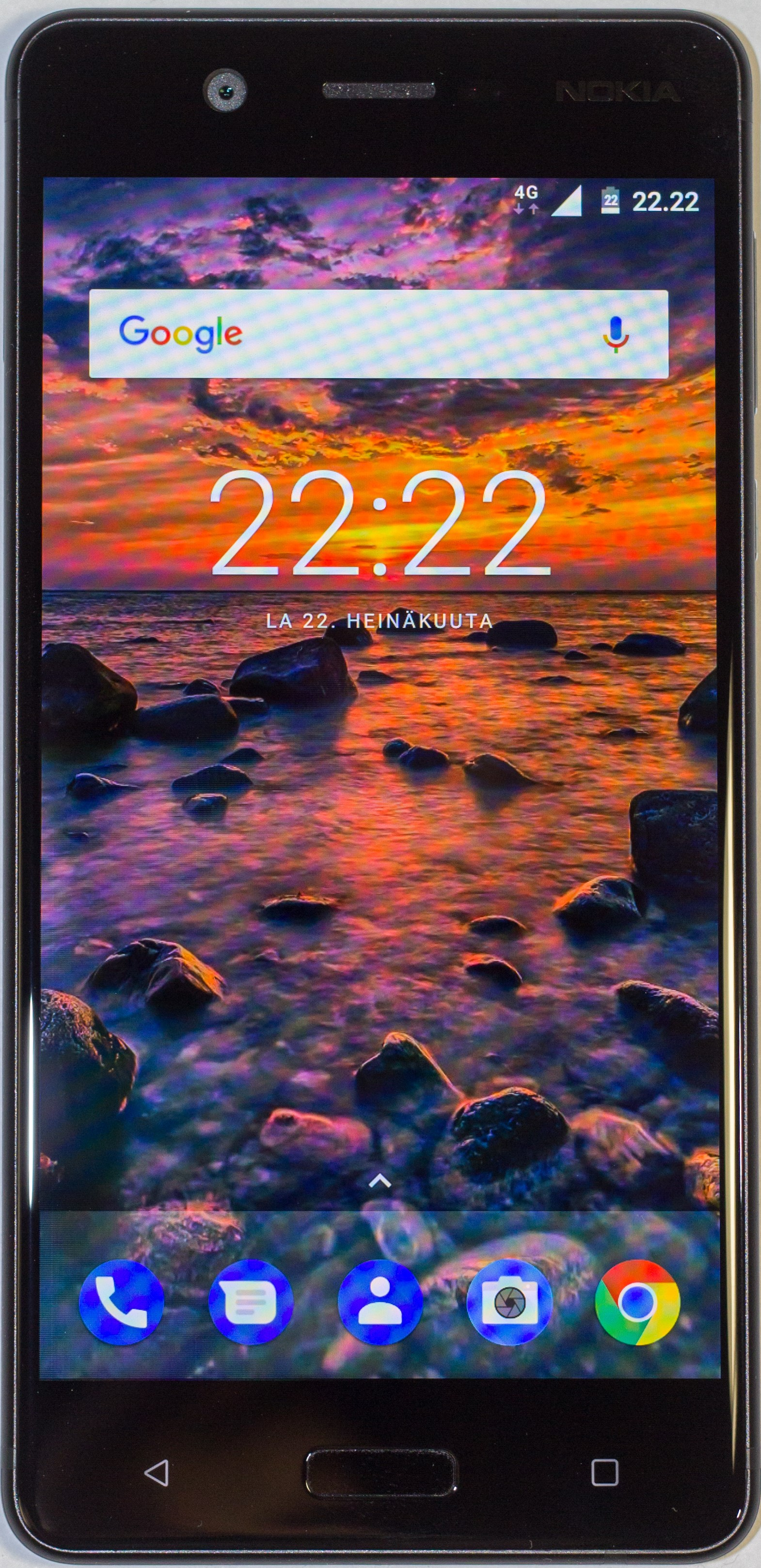
- Brand: Nokia
- Developer: HMD Global
- Manufacturer: Foxconn
- Type: Smartphone
- First released: 15 August 2017; 9 years ago
- Discontinued: 27 November 2021; 4 years ago
- Successor: Nokia 5.1
- Related: Nokia 1 Nokia 2 Nokia 3 Nokia 6 Nokia 7 Nokia 8
- Dimensions: 149.7 mm (5.89 in) H 72.5 mm (2.85 in) W 8.05 mm (0.317 in) D 8.55 mm (0.337 in) D (including camera bump)
- Weight: 160 g (6 oz)
- Operating system: Original: Android 7.1.1 "Nougat"; Current: Android 9.0 "Pie"
- System-on-chip: Qualcomm Snapdragon 430
- CPU: Octa-core 1.4 GHz Cortex -A53
- GPU: Adreno 505
- Memory: 2/3 GB RAM
- Storage: 16 GB
- Removable storage: microSDXC, expandable up to 256 GB (dedicated slot)
- Battery: 3,000 mAh Non-removable, Li-Po
- Rear camera: 13 MP PDAF, 1.12 μm pixel size, f/2 aperture, Dual-Tone flash
- Front camera: 8 MP AF, 1.12 μm, f/2 aperture, FOV 84 degrees
- Display: 5.2 in (130 mm) diagonal IPS LCD; Laminated and polarized, with scratch-resistant Corning Gorilla Glass; 1280x720 px 16:9 aspect ratio, Curved display
- Sound: 3.5 mm headphone jack Single speaker Smart amplifier (TFA9891)
- Connectivity: Micro USB (USB 2.0), USB OTG, Wi-Fi, Bluetooth 4.1, NFC
- Data inputs: Multi-touch screen accelerometer ambient light sensor digital compass fingerprint sensor Hall-effect sensor gyroscope proximity sensor

The Nokia 5 is a mid-range Android smartphone by HMD Global. It was announced along with the Nokia 6, Nokia 3, and Nokia 3310 (2017) at the MWC 2017 in Barcelona, Spain.

== Specifications ==
=== Hardware ===
The Nokia 5 has a 5.2-inch LTPS IPS LCD, Qualcomm Snapdragon 430 SoC with an octa-core 1.4 GHz Cortex-A53 CPU, 2 or 3 GB of RAM and 16 GB of internal storage that can be expanded using microSD cards up to 256 GB. The phone also has a 3000 mAh Li-ion battery, a 13 MP rear camera with LED flash and 8 MP front-facing camera with auto-focus. It is available in Tempered Blue, Silver, Matte Black, and Copper colours.

=== Software ===
The Nokia 5 was originally launched with Android 7.1.1 Nougat. HMD Global has stated that they are providing a bloatware-free version of Android by not providing any unnecessary extra software. The company has also committed to provide regular feature and security updates.

In October 2017, the Android 7.1.2 Nougat update was rolled out for the Nokia 5.

On 12 December 2017, Juho Sarvikas, the Chief Product Officer at HMD Global, announced on Twitter that users of the Nokia 5 could test Android 8.0 Oreo on their devices by registering on Beta Labs, Nokia's Android beta testing program. The official Android 8.0 Oreo update began rolling out to the Nokia 5 on January 30, 2018.

Nokia announced on Twitter that the Nokia 5, along with the Nokia 6 and Nokia 3 would receive the Android Pie update. The update began rolling out to the Nokia 5 on January 24, 2019.

== Reception ==
The Nokia 5 generally received positive reviews, with Andrew Hoyle of CNET praising the design, pricing and battery while criticising the mediocre performance and camera. John McCann of TechRadar praised the “premium design” and use of stock Android while noting that load times could be sluggish and photos could be dark.
