= Nokia OZO =

Audio software technology

Nokia OZO is a set of audio software technologies that works for some smartphones, tablets, laptops, and cameras. Developed by Nokia, the name was originally used for a now-discontinued virtual reality camera.

== OZO audio capture and playback ==
OZO Audio utilizes spatial audio technology for recording, and its features include Audio 3D (for spatial audio capture), Audio Zoom and Audio Windscreen (for wind noise reduction).

OZO Immersive Voice offers a 360° audio experience in communication, enabling spatial communication both real-time and non-real time. With capabilities of interactive stereo and immersive audio communications as well as content sharing and distribution, the OZO Immersive Voice technology aligns with the newest 3GPP codec for low-delay Immersive Voice and Audio Services (IVAS).

OZO Playback provides spatial audio listening experience for device users with features like Stereo Widening and Bass Enhancement, which Nokia claims enhances playback through the device’s own loudspeakers and headphones.

Devices like Oppo Find X3 Pro family, OnePlus 9 Pro Series, ASUS ROG Phone 5, and Asus ZenFone 8 and ZenFone 9 all utilize OZO Audio, as well as HMD Global’s Nokia branded smartphones X10, X20, G10 and G20 are equipped with OZO Audio. The Nokia XR20 smartphone and Nokia T20 tablet featured both OZO Audio and OZO Playback.

== OZO VR camera ==
Originally Nokia used the name OZO for an advanced Virtual Reality camera, which was able to record stereoscopic (3D) 360-degree video. The device was announced in July 2015 and first released on 30 November 2015.

The OZO camera was made of aluminum alloy and contained eight lenses and microphones which combined to record stereoscopic (3D) 360-degree video and audio. The audio recording technology in the OZO camera was OZO Audio. Each lens had a 195-degree field of view, shooting at 30 frames per second. The camera was aimed at professional filmmakers, like Disney, which started to use the OZO for filmmaking in April 2016.

Nokia announced the end of production of the OZO camera on 10 October 2017, citing a "slower-than-expected" virtual reality market, but continuing to provide customer support.

== See also ==
- 3D audio effect
- 3D sound localization
- Spatial music
- Dolby Atmos
