= Nokia 6 =

Nokia-branded midrange Android smartphone

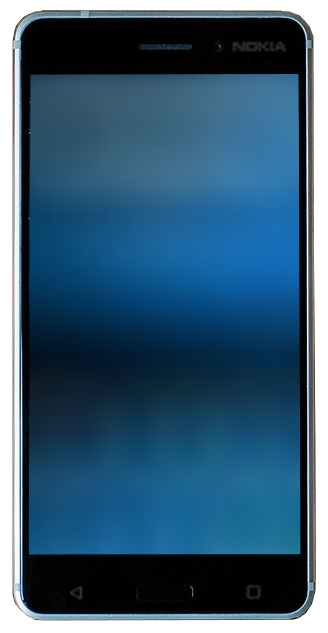
- Brand: Nokia
- Developer: HMD Global
- Manufacturer: Foxconn
- Type: Smartphone
- Family: Single digit Series
- First released: 20 January 2017; 9 years ago
- Discontinued: 25 June 2018; 8 years ago
- Predecessor: Microsoft Lumia 650
- Successor: Nokia 6.1; Nokia X6 (2018)
- Related: Nokia 1 Nokia 2 Nokia 3 Nokia 5 Nokia 7 Nokia 8
- Dimensions: 154×75.8×7.9 mm (6.06×2.98×0.31 in)
- Weight: 169 g (5.96 oz)
- Operating system: Original: Android 7.1.1 "Nougat"; Current: Android 9.0 "Pie"
- System-on-chip: Qualcomm Snapdragon 430 (28 nm)
- CPU: Octa core 1.4 GHz Cortex-A53
- GPU: Adreno 505
- Memory: 3 or 4 GB RAM
- Storage: 32 or 64 GB
- Removable storage: microSD, up to 128 GB
- Battery: 3000 mAh Li-Po
- Rear camera: 16 MP, AF, f/2.0, dual-tone LED flash for true and natural colour
- Front camera: 8 MP, f/2.0, 1/4.0"
- Display: 5.5" 1080p Full HD 2.5D curved display with Gorilla Glass 3
- Sound: Dual speaker, 3.5mm Headphone jack, Active noise cancellation with dedicated microphone, Dolby Atmos surround sound
- Connectivity: 3.5 mm TRRS headphone jack; Bluetooth; USB 2.0 via Micro-USB port
- Data inputs: Multi-touch screen
- Other: Compass, fingerprint reader (front-mounted), NFC (Note: see Variants)

The Nokia 6 is a Nokia-branded mid-range smartphone running on Android. It is the first smartphone from the Finnish company HMD Global, (Note: Under license from Nokia Corporation) created through the partial divestment of Nokia's devices division; the first Nokia-branded smartphone since the Lumia 638; and the first Nokia-branded Android smartphone since the short-lived Nokia X2 in 2014. The phone was first announced for sale in China on January 8, 2017, with a global version announced the following month.

The successor to the Nokia 6, the Nokia 6.1, was announced on January 5, 2018, in China and on February 25, 2018, for other parts of the world.

== Specifications ==
=== Hardware ===
The Nokia 6 features a 16:9 5.5-inch Full HD display. It is powered by a Qualcomm Snapdragon 430 processor and has a micro-USB port. It has a 16-megapixel rear camera and an 8-megapixel front-facing camera with autofocus. The phone has either a single SIM slot or a hybrid SIM slot which can hold a Nano-SIM card and either a MicroSD card or another SIM card.

=== Software ===
The Nokia 6 2017 version originally shipped with an unmodified version of Android 7.1.1 Nougat as opposed to modified versions which are used by most manufacturers; an update to Android 7.1.2 Nougat came out in October 2017. In late January 2018, the stable version of Android 8.0 Oreo was released for the Nokia 6. By March 28, 2018, the Android 8.1.0 Oreo Update came out with the March Security Patch. On February 21, 2019, the Nokia 6 received the Android 9 Pie update.

== Release ==
The Nokia 6 was first released in China on January 20, 2017, shortly after its announcement. Demand was high, and it was sold out within minutes after receiving over a million registrations. On February 26, 2017, at Mobile World Congress 2017, it was announced that Nokia 6 will be available globally. It was released in other Asian markets including Malaysia on May 30, 2017, and has been rolled out in Europe starting June 2017.

== Reception ==
The Nokia 6 generally received positive reviews. John McCann of TechRadar praised the phone's camera, performance and affordability while criticising the "slow-to-charge" and uncomfortable design.

Trusted Reviews praised the phone's "solid battery life" and metal shell, while criticising the camera's performance in low lighting and mixed lighting.

== See also ==
- Microsoft Lumia 650
