= HMD Global =

Finnish mobile phone manufacturer

HMD Global Oy
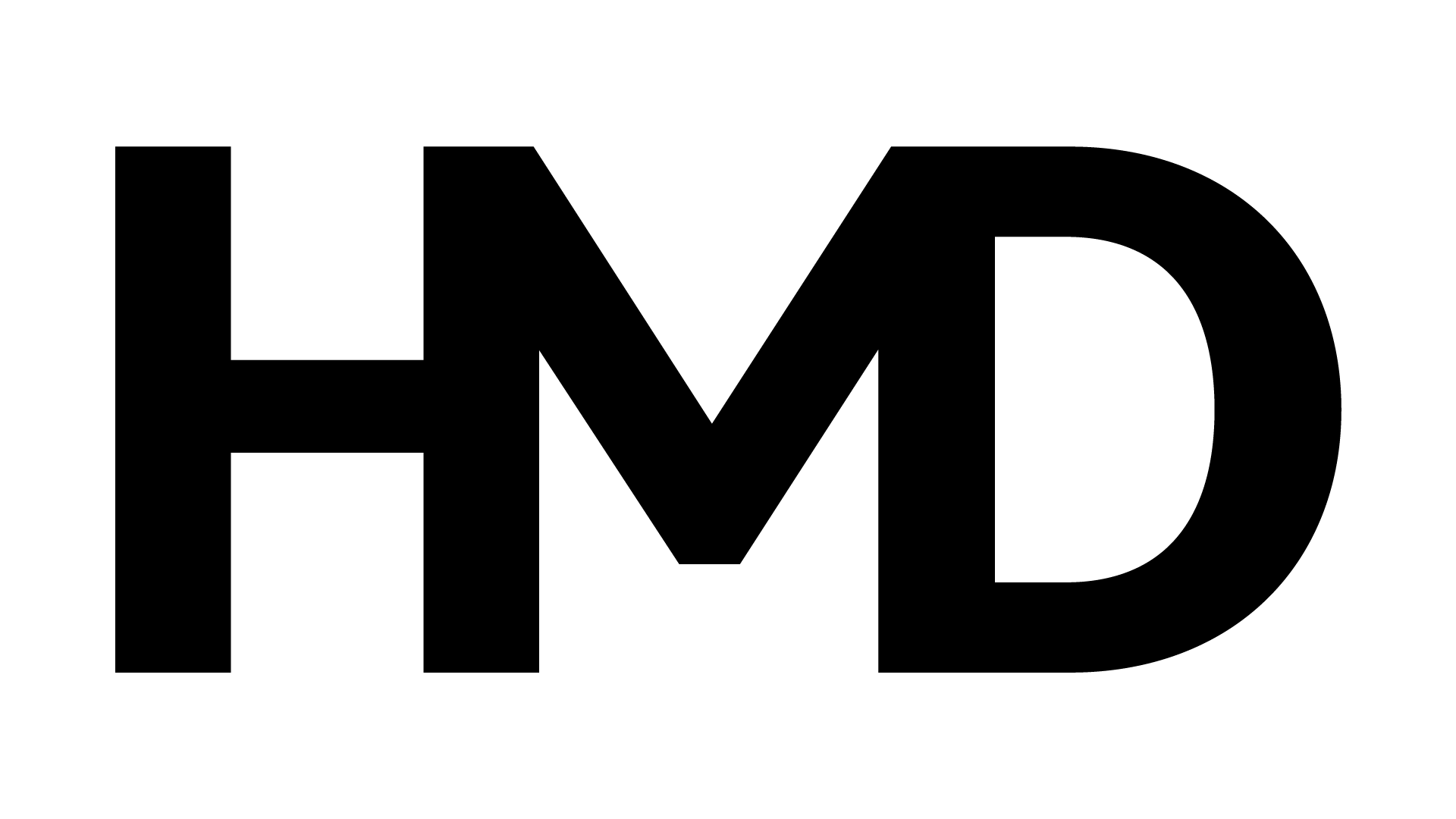
- Corporate logo for HMD since 2024
- Type: Osakeyhtiö (Limited company)
- Industry: Consumer electronics
- Predecessor: Microsoft Mobile Oy
- Founded: 1 December 2016; 9 years ago
- Founder: Jean-Francois Baril
- Headquarters: Espoo, Finland
- Area served: Worldwide, except the United States
- Key people: Jean-Francois Baril (Executive Chairman & CEO); Alain Lejeune (COO); Anssi Rönnemaa (CFO and CCO); Lars Silberbauer (CMO)
- Products: Mobile phones, smartphones, feature phones, tablet computers
- Brands: HMD; Nokia (used for feature phones; and used for smart phones before 2024)
- Revenue: ▼€1.2 billion (2022)
- Net income: ▲ −€76.9 million (2022)
- Number of employees: 500+ (2024)
- Website: www.hmd.com

HMD Global Oy (Human Mobile Devices) is a Finnish independent mobile phone manufacturer. The company is made up of the mobile phone business that the Nokia Corporation sold to Microsoft in 2014, then bought back in 2016 by former executives who formed HMD Global. HMD began marketing Nokia-branded smartphones and feature phones on 1 December 2016, through an exclusive licensing agreement, and began producing self-branded HMD phones in March 2024.

HMD formed a partnership with Google, and uses the Android operating system on their smartphones, originally under the Android One program, whereas HMD's feature phones use the Series 30+ platform as well as the more advanced KaiOS. Manufacturing is outsourced to Foxconn subsidiary FIH Mobile. Nokia has a stake in HMD, and remains a partner, setting mandatory requirements and providing patents and technologies, in return for royalty payments.

== History ==
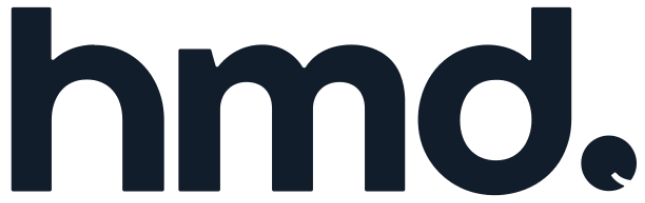
The previous logo of HMD (2016–2024)

=== Context ===
Nokia was one of the largest global mobile phone and smartphone makers until it began to struggle in maintaining market leadership due to the rise of more innovative smartphone offerings from Apple, Samsung and Google. Due to various factors, Nokia was unable to maintain the popularity it once had back in the 2000s. Its initial partnership with Microsoft to use its operating system did not help either as Windows Phone's mobile app offerings were not as comprehensive as the ones available on Apple's iOS and Google's Android.

At this point of time, Nokia had a lineup of feature phones, and a range of low- to high-end smartphones under the Nokia Eseries, Microsoft Lumia and Nokia Asha product lines.

By the early 2010s, Nokia had lost major market share in the mobile phone market, and was overtaken by Apple and Samsung.

In 2014, Nokia's mobile phone business was sold to Microsoft, along with the right to use the Nokia brand for mobile phones for ten years. The sale did not end the woes of the business. Microsoft used the brand primarily as a means of introducing its Windows Phone mobile operating system, which was itself struggling to establish any kind of significant market presence. The range of Microsoft Lumia smartphones did not gain significant traction in the highly competitive smartphone market dominated by Android and iOS devices. There were further internal struggles, as Microsoft tried to reconcile the Nokia brand with its own objectives under Microsoft Mobile. By October 2014, Microsoft decided to drop the Nokia brand in favor of its Microsoft-branded Lumia smartphone range with the release of Microsoft Lumia 535, while only the featurephone segment kept the Nokia brand.

==== Formation of HMD and launch ====
The CEO of Nokia, Rajeev Suri, said in June 2015 that the Nokia brand would return to smartphones. Earlier that year Nokia Technologies released the N1 tablet running Android. Under the terms of the acquisition agreement with Microsoft, Nokia could not sell Nokia-branded phones until 31 December 2015. Suri said in February 2016 that he wanted the company to be in a position where it co-designs with another manufacturer, but keeps "appropriate control measures".

HMD Global Oy was originally incorporated in Helsinki on 9 November 2015.

On 18 May 2016, Microsoft Mobile announced the sale of its feature phone business to HMD Global and FIH Mobile. The sale included design rights, and its rights to use Nokia brand on all types of mobile phones and tablets worldwide until 2024, except in Japan, where Nokia-branded mobile phones have not been sold since 2008. HMD also signed a licensing agreement with Nokia Corporation which included giving it use of cellular standard essential patent licenses. Nokia has said this move is "uniting one of the world's iconic mobile brands with the leading mobile operating system". Some factories of Microsoft Mobile, including one located in Vietnam, had been sold to Foxconn, the world's largest electronics manufacturer.

It was agreed that HMD products would be manufactured in the FIH/Foxconn factories. The total sale to both HMD Global and FIH Mobile amounted to US$350 million. HMD have decided to spend US$500 million in supporting the marketing of the new products over the next three years. In addition the company is backed by a Luxembourg-based private equity fund called Smart Connect LP, run by Jean-François Baril, who was senior vice president of Nokia from 1999 to 2012.

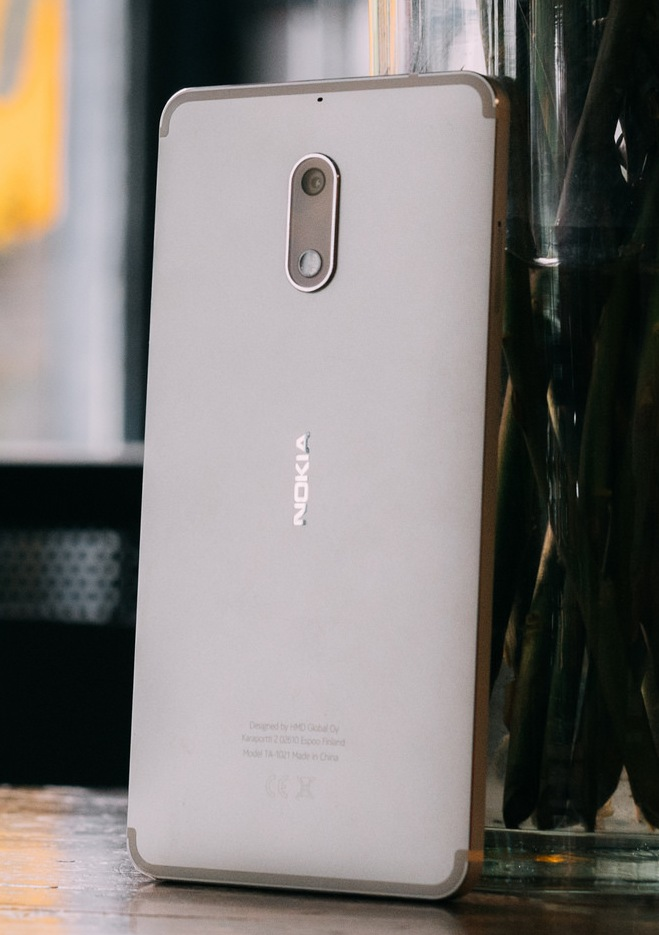
Nokia 6, HMD's first smartphone and the first Google Play certified Android-powered Nokia

On 1 December 2016, the Nokia website showed mobile devices for sale for the first time since 2014. Their first devices, Nokia 150 and 150 Dual SIM feature phones, was announced on 13 December 2016, while their first Android smartphone, Nokia 6, was announced on 8 January 2017. At Mobile World Congress in February 2017, HMD announced the relaunch of the iconic Nokia 3310, along with two new Android devices named Nokia 3 and Nokia 5. The first Nokia branded Android smartphone, Nokia 6 was released in China and a few other Asian markets starting January, while Western releases commenced in June starting with Finland, with a full worldwide release of all three Android devices by August 2017.

HMD used a marketing strategy advertising Nokia phones as "pure, secure and up to date" (referring to a stock Android interface and its commitment to fast updates) as well as brand trust and nostalgia.

HMD is headquartered in Espoo, Finland, and is largely run by former Nokia executives. The first CEO was Arto Nummela, a Nokia veteran of 17 years, until July 2017, when company president Florian Seiche took over as CEO.

=== 2017-2023 ===
On 6 July 2017 HMD partnered with Carl Zeiss AG to provide camera lens optics for Nokia smartphones. Nokia previously used Zeiss optics in its mobile phone lineup from 2005 to 2014.

On 27 July 2017, HMD purchased 500 design patents from Microsoft Mobile that were originally created by Nokia. One notable patent is the Lumia Camera user interface, which had been highly praised by critics since appearing on the Nokia Lumia 1020.

On 16 August 2017, HMD introduced their first flagship Nokia smartphone, the Nokia 8. Its most distinguishing features are Dual Sight, allowing live streaming with both the front and rear Zeiss cameras (referred to as "bothie", a pun on "selfie"), and OZO Audio, which contains spatial 360° audio technology derived from Nokia's high-end OZO camera.

In September 2017, HMD acquired the design patent of Nokia Lumia 2520.

On 25 October 2017, HMD revived the Nokia Beta Labs, a beta software program.

On 11 January 2018, HMD Global acquired the Asha brand name.

On 25 February 2018, A new high-end flagship was introduced, Nokia 8 Sirocco, featuring a curved all-glass design and its name referring to the older Nokia 8800 Sirocco, as well as Nokia 7 plus, and ultra-low-cost smartphone, Nokia 1. In addition, HMD re-introduced the Nokia Pro Camera app for Zeiss camera phones. The classic 8110 was also reintroduced.

In late July 2018, HMD announced vacancy for a team to expand the business in USA.

For the Chinese market, Nokia X6 was announced, which got a worldwide release as Nokia 6.1 Plus. Another Chinese-market device, called Nokia X5, was later announced. Both of these have bezel-less screens. These devices are direct successors to the mid-upper range Xseries used for the touchscreen Symbian smartphones

In late August 2018, HMD acquired PureView branding, the imaging technology brand which had previously been implemented on high-end Nokia/Lumia smartphones since the Nokia 808 PureView in 2012.

In November 2019, HMD announced Nokia C1, the Android Go smartphone.

On 19 March 2020, HMD held an online event and announced Nokia 8.3 5G, the first ever Nokia-branded 5G smartphone, and the "world's first truly global 5G device". Other products announced the same day were Nokia 5.3, Nokia 1.3, and revival of Nokia 5310 XpressMusic. HMD also introduced HMD Connect, which is a global roaming data SIM card, with associated plans. Nokia 6.2 and Nokia 7.2 get exclusive 007-branded Kevlar cases in conjunction to the HMD marketing campaign with James Bond movie No Time to Die.

In July 2020, HMD acquired Valona Labs, a mobile software cybersecurity company.

=== 2024-present ===
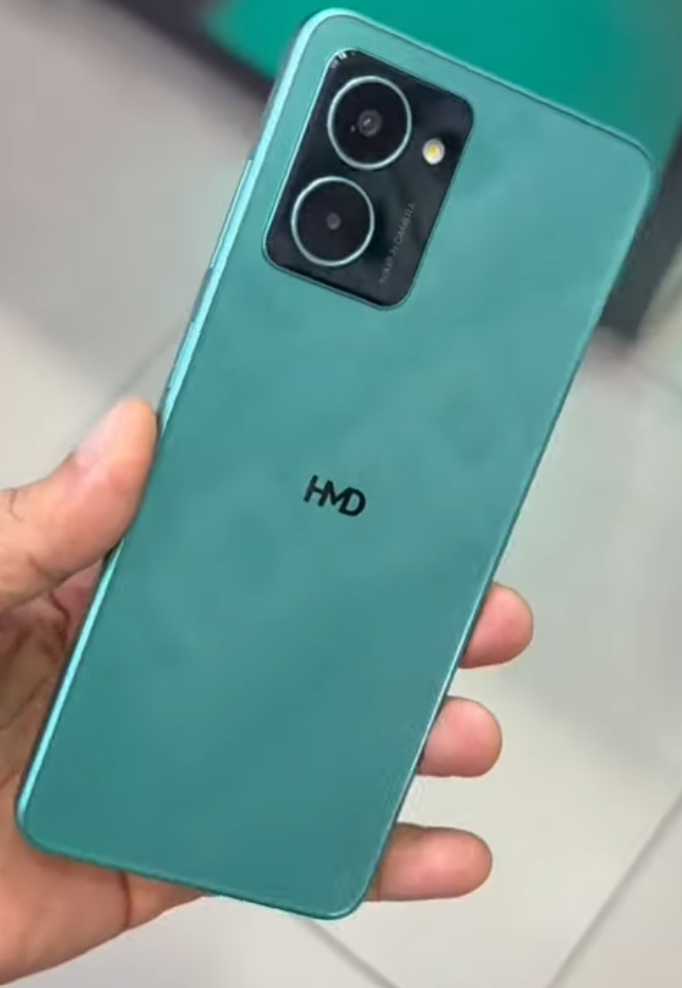
HMD Pulse Pro, one of the company's first smartphones with the new HMD brand released in 2024

The HMD brand was initially only used for corporate purposes and did not appear in advertising, while the name "Nokia Mobile" is used on social media. In January 2024, HMD rebranded to 'Human Mobile Devices'.

Starting in 2023, HMD has considered dropping the Nokia branding in favor of the generic HMD brand in order to diversify its portfolio. This came to fruition with the 2024 release of the HMD Vibe as the first non-Nokia HMD smartphone, and by 2025, HMD has discontinued the smartphones that are still under the Nokia brand, with the exception of feature phones. It has been suggested that HMD have been preparing for the event that its exclusive agreement with Nokia Corporation will not be renewed as it will expire by 2026. However, in September 2025, Nokia Corporation has extended its licensing agreement with HMD by another two to three years beyond the original 2026 expiration, ensuring that Nokia-branded feature phones will continue to be sold through HMD Global.

On 8 September 2025, HMD announced that it was pulling out of the US market due to unfavourable regulatory conditions, particularly new tariffs on imported goods. The post reiterated that existing devices will be supported for the full warranty period, but all new devices will be exclusive to the international market. Subsequently, the US webpage for HMD was taken down and redirected to the international site.

== Product naming ==
The product naming of Nokia devices has historically been based on the numerical system, with new Nokia-branded Android smartphones being named from 1 to 9; with Nokia 1 series being the lowest-end entry level smartphone, and the Nokia 9 series being the highest-end offering of the portfolio. For device successors, and new products launched under the same series, the decimal system (similar to the naming convention of software versions) is being used to denote the different smartphone versions (for e.g. Nokia 6 (2017), Nokia 6.1 (2018), Nokia 6.2 (2019), Nokia 6.3, and so on...). In addition to this, Verizon carrier locked phones are marked with a V, such as the Nokia 9V Pureview

In April 2021, a new two-digit nomenclature was introduced with the launch of the G series and X series alongside the existing C series.

== Software ==
Nokia is in partnership with Google, and their Nokia-branded smartphones run Google's Android operating system. The software has minimal customizations and is stock Android, with some notable customizations including tweaked icons with a more general blue theme, a different camera app, and the additions of the classic Nokia startup tone and the Nokia tune ringtone. HMD calls it "pure, secure and up-to-date", claiming it does not contain Software bloat or additional software and that the phones will get fast software updates compared to other OEMs. Until the launch of Google Pixel smartphones it was seen as a spiritual successor to Google's former Nexus series, which were known for running stock Android. HMD's launch devices came preloaded with Android version 7 "Nougat". Devices released after 2017 come preloaded with Android 8 "Oreo" or Android 9 "Pie". Devices released after December 2019 come with Android 10 "Q", however it is confirmed that some phones will get an update to Android 10 "Q".

Former CEO Arto Nummela, said in a June 2017 interview that HMD is a "first tier partner with Google."

In August 2019 Counterpoint research said that "Nokia Leads the Global Rankings in Updating Smartphone Software and Security [out of 3rd party Android OEMs]". According to Exhibit 2: Time Taken by Top 10 Manufacturers to Upgrade Portfolios to the Latest Android Version, Nokia were, over the 12 months following Android 9's launch, in first place for % of [Smartphone] Portfolio Updated to Android Pie. However, with the increasing product portfolio Nokia could not keep to this high standards and updates are delayed longer and distributed less frequently. The phones typically receive updates for two to three years.

On feature phones, HMD has used Series 30+, Smart Feature OS powered by Java for Nokia 3310 3G and KaiOS for Nokia 8110 4G and in the Chinese market, AliOS.

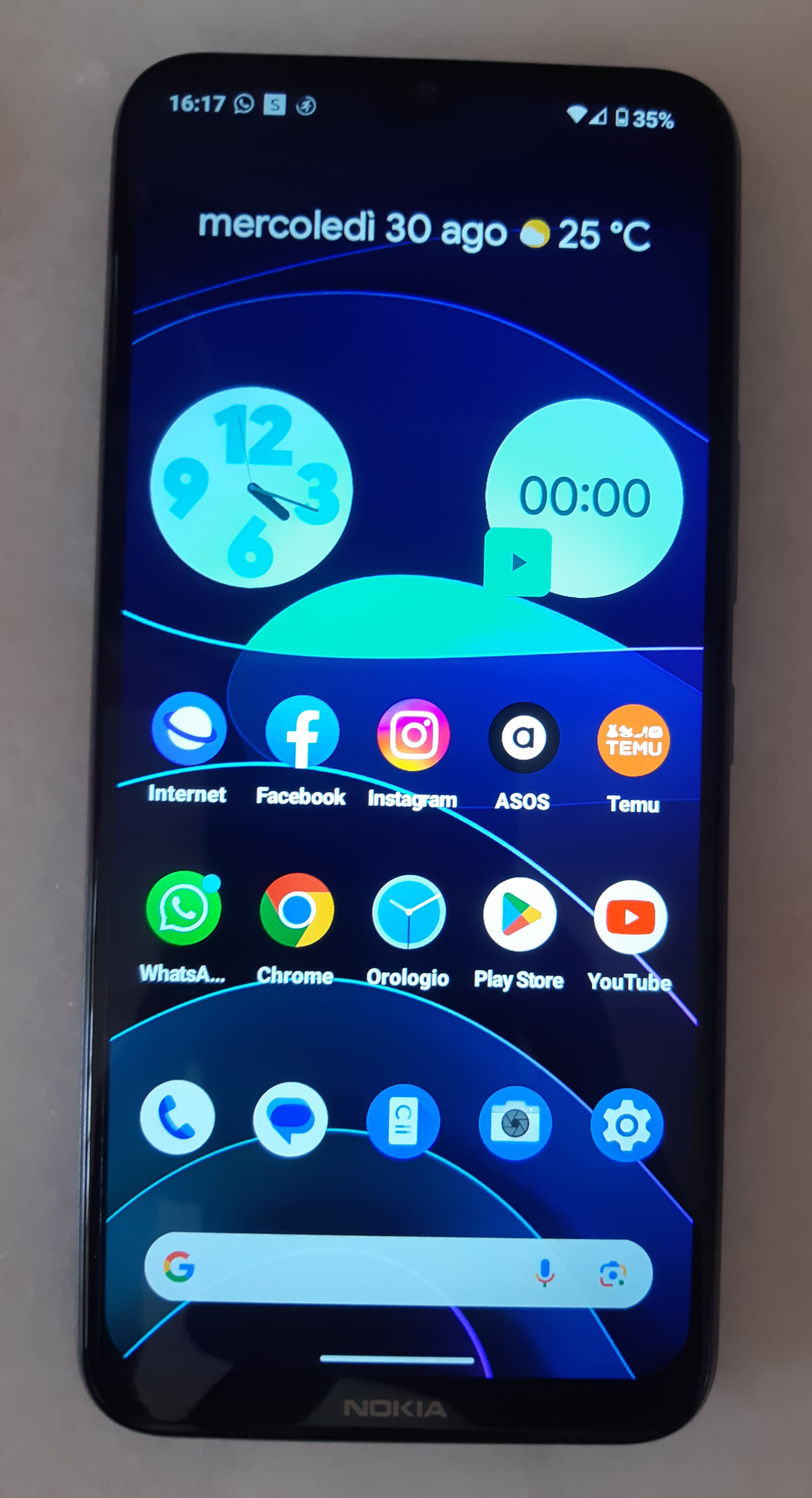
Nokia smartphone with Android

=== Nokia and Android ===
After the announcement of Google's Open Handset Alliance in November 2007, Nokia said it "considered" joining the alliance, despite its majority stake in Symbian Software Nokia eventually did not join and instead created the rival Symbian Foundation in 2008 after taking control of the Symbian operating system and making it open source. In 2010 as competition stiffened, Nokia lost some partners of the Symbian Foundation who then supported Google only. By now Nokia planned to replace Symbian with the Linux-based MeeGo after the N9 flagship. As MeeGo and Android are based upon Linux, some speculated that this would be a roadmap in Nokia's eventual adoption of Android.

Under CEO Stephen Elop the company chose to halt the MeeGo project in favour of adopting Windows Phone, which resulted in a partnership with Microsoft in 2011, with Symbian to be relegated. Google's chief executive Eric Schmidt confirmed that the company held extensive "confidential negotiations" with Nokia to encourage using Android. Despite this, Nokia still experimented with Android that year and leaked images showed a Nokia N9 prototype running Android. In late 2013 when Microsoft announced its intention to purchase the Nokia mobile phone division, the New York Times reported that a team at Nokia were secretly testing Android on Microsoft Lumia devices, but that Microsoft was aware of this. Some analysts think Microsoft bought the business because Nokia were thinking of switching to Android, which could have resulted in Microsoft losing its dominant Windows Phone OEM. In December 2013 there were leaks of a Nokia Android smartphone codenamed Normandy, along with the cancelled Meltineme Project on Lumia hardware, which was eventually introduced as the Nokia X series in February 2014, featuring a heavily customized version of the Android Open Source Project (AOSP) and released in emerging markets. The acquisition was completed just two months later, and Microsoft discontinued the X series soon afterward. In an interview with Forbes, former HMD CEO Arto Nummela stated that the Nokia X family surprisingly became popular with users of high-end Samsung and Apple smartphone devices, despite the fact that it was a mid to low end device series.

After the sale, the Nokia Technologies division developed the N1 Android tablet, featuring the Z Launcher interface, released in China in 2015. Later that year, images of an N1-like phone with Android called the C1 were leaked. Nokia CEO Rajeev Suri confirmed the return of the Nokia brand to smartphones in June 2015 through a licensing strategy, and the formation of HMD Global was finally announced in May 2016. Nokia 6 was announced in January 2017, almost six years after declining to use Google/Android and partnering with Microsoft.

=== S30+ OS ===
Series 30+ (abbreviated as S30+) is a software platform and application user interface used for Nokia-branded mobile devices. The platform was introduced by Nokia in September 2013, first appearing on the Nokia 108, and has been the main Nokia feature phone operating system after the end of the Series 30 and Series 40 platforms in 2014. Despite the similar name and user interface, S30+ is technically completely different and unrelated to S30.

Many S30+ devices only support MAUI Runtime Environment, and application file (.vxp) developed by MediaTek, but some later devices have included support for J2ME applications. Some S30+ models also come with an app store that would allow downloading new apps and games.

Newer phone models with "Series 30+" platform are said to be based on Mocor RTOS, which use the graphical user interface similar to the Smart Feature OS in Nokia 3310 3G (2019 version).

==== Smart Feature OS ====
"Smart Feature OS" is an operating system providing some smart capabilities in devices with a feature phone form factor. Smart Feature OS is mainly based on Mocor RTOS, used on the Nokia 3310 3G only. The phone uses Opera Mini 4 as the default browser.

=== KaiOS ===
Another OS used by HMD is KaiOS for Nokia 8110 4G, Nokia 800 Tough, Nokia 2720 Flip, Nokia 6300 4G and Nokia 8000 4G, debuted on Nokia 8110 4G. The newer KaiOS - based system is integrated with many of Google's services. KaiOS phones have an appstore, UC Browser can be downloaded. Nokia 8110 4G have the graphical user interface similar to the Smart Feature OS in Nokia 3310 3G.

=== Cloud Phone ===
Since late 2023, HMD has collaborated with CloudMosa to introduce various cloud-based widgets for feature phones using the Cloud Phone technology. Cloud Phone is a platform that allows 4G feature phones to use various modern third-party services through the cloud. This partnership marks the first time that Nokia Series 30+ devices are capable of accessing YouTube, Shorts, TikTok, Google Sign-in Services, and real-time modern web applications. The first device to support Cloud Apps on Series 30+ is the Nokia 110 4G (2023), with all devices released in 2023 onwards set to feature this capability through OTA updates.

On 24 April 2024, HMD launched three new 4G feature phones: Nokia 215 4G, 225 4G, 235 4G, and Nokia 3210, all supporting the Cloud Phone technology.

In September 2025, HMD launched HMD Touch 4G, which was the first ever touchscreen device that supported the Cloud Phone technology.

== Hardware ==
The design language of Nokia smartphones from HMD consists of typical Scandinavian design and aesthetics, and are considered to be reminiscent of the previous Microsoft Lumia series, with clean and minimal styling. When HMD was formed in 2016, it stated that it wanted to develop phones that stay loyal to Nokia's popular heritage of "design, robustness and reliability". The company's design team is headed by Raun Forsyth and Alasdair McPhail.

The Nokia 5, 6, and 8 are made from a single block of 6000 series aluminium, while the 7 is crafted from 7000 series aluminum. The Nokia 8 Sirocco is crafted from a single block of stainless steel.

In 2017 Nokia started resurrecting its classic devices. This began in May 2017 when a new 3310 handset was introduced at the Mobile World Congress. It sported an updated but similar design language to the original, which debuted in September 2000. This device was still a feature phone but it shipped with a fresh operating system, colored display, and Nokia native applications. After the success of this initiative, Nokia again rebooted one of its classic phones, the Nokia 8110, which featured a 4G update, excellent battery life, and classic Nokia apps.

== Relationship with Zeiss ==
Nokia and Zeiss has been partners since the development of the Nokia N90 in 2005. The partnership between the two companies continued until Nokia's departure from the mobile industry in 2013. In the same year, the partnership was carried over to Microsoft when it acquired Nokia's mobile business. The last Microsoft smartphone with the Zeiss lens was the Lumia 950 and Lumia 950 XL released in 2015.

In 2016, Microsoft sold its feature phone business to HMD Global and FIH Mobile. This was then followed by the licensing of the Nokia brand for smartphones from Nokia Corporation. In July 2017, HMD Global and Zeiss rekindled its "exclusive" partnership. The first Nokia Android smartphone with Zeiss lens was the flagship Nokia 8.

On 25 July 2022, Zeiss confirmed through the European website, Nokiamob, that the partnership between the two companies ended in 2021. It is clear that the partnership became non-exclusive at that point. This makes Vivo and Sony Mobile the last remaining partners of Zeiss.

After long and successful collaboration, in 2021 Zeiss and HMD Global mutually agreed not to prolong their non-exclusive partnership which included collaboration for imaging technologies of "Nokia" branded smartphones with ZEISS as consulting and development partner.

The Nokia XR20 is the last Nokia smartphone with the Zeiss lens, while the Nokia 8.3 5G is the last Nokia device with the PureView technology without Zeiss lens or branding. The last Nokia flagship with both Zeiss and PureView was the Nokia 9 PureView back in 2019. The Nokia X30 5G is the first Nokia device with PureView technology but without Zeiss lens.

== Reception ==
The highlights of HMD's Nokia smartphones have been build-quality and design. TechRadar noted the premium build of the Nokia 5, despite its low cost, whereas GSMArena said, that the Nokia 6 was "built like a tank." Juho Sarvikas, chief product officer at HMD, said "it has the build quality that you expect from Nokia." The result of a Nokia 6 build has been called an "aluminium unibody with the highest level of visual and structural quality." TechRadar called Nokia 8 "one of the most – if not the most – beautiful phones we've ever seen with the Nokia branding emblazoned on the rear."

HMD have also been initially praised for its commitment of providing zero-day and monthly security patches, as well as stock Android without an additional user interface. However starting around late 2020 and early 2021, several Nokia smartphone updates to Android 11 were delayed to Q2 2021 (and beyond). In late 2021, HMD announced the high end Nokia 9 PureView devices will not receive an update to Android 11 after all, resulting to HMD offering affected customers a 50% discount on a Nokia X family device. This goes with a strong consumer dissatisfaction in recent time. Advertisement on instant updates has been reduced in a large scale on HMD's Nokia website.

The Nokia 3310 reboot has been praised as a clever marketing strategy that revived interest in the brand, with one analyst calling it a "PR stunt."

According to ZDNet on 5 March 2020, Nokia smartphones ranked second highest in resale value in 2019, just below iPhone. The average depreciation rate in 2019 was 27.68%, the lowest among Android smartphone brands.

A common criticism of some of the Nokia smartphones has been the choice of system-on-chips (SoCs) on several models. The original lineup, Nokia 3, 5, and 6, uses an older entry-level SoC, which put a strain on software performance. The 2019 models Nokia 6.2, 7.2, and 9 PureView uses the older Qualcomm Snapdragon SoCs from 2017 to 2018. Analysts have also noted the new Nokia 3310 as being "overpriced," and that similar basic phones can be bought for almost half the price. Cheaper counterfeit versions of the new Nokia 3310 have been produced due to the model's popularity.

=== Sales ===
HMD executive Juho Sarvikas said on 16 August 2017 that the company had shipped "millions of units of the 3, 5 and 6," with demand "far outstripping" supply. As of June 2017, demand of the new Nokia 3310 has been up to seven times higher than expected in the UK.

By Q2 2017, HMD had 0.4% market share in the smartphone market, making it the 11th largest in Europe, and 5th largest in Finland. An IDC analyst called it a "great start." According to Counterpoint Research on 1 December 2017, – the first anniversary of HMD – the company was the 8th largest mobile phone vendor in the world (this includes both smartphones and feature phones). It was ranked 5th in India, 4th in Russia, 3rd in the UK, and 1st in the Middle East. It also became the 4th vendor in Germany as of Q3 2017.

1.5 million Nokia smartphones were sold in the first half of 2017, up from virtually zero the year before.

In Q4 2017, HMD was the best-selling mobile phone vendor overall in Vietnam and most Middle Eastern countries, and also the no. 1 feature phone vendor worldwide. It was also the 3rd best-selling smartphone vendor in the UK, the first time for the Nokia brand since 2010. In Q3 2018, HMD had the biggest year-on-year sales growth of 71% to 4.8 million units shipped that quarter, making it the 9th largest smartphone vendor worldwide.

In Q2 2019, HMD sold 4.8 million smartphones, up from 4.5 million in Q2 2018.

In the year 2022 HMD sold a total of 40 million devices, down from 56 million in 2021.

== Operation ==
=== Staff ===
The CEO and presidency role is fulfilled by Jean-Francois Baril. He has been in the post since November 2022 having replaced Florian Seiche. Seiche, formerly Nokia Europe's senior vice president of sales and marketing, who also had stints at Siemens, Orange and HTC. The original CEO was Arto Nummela, who joined Nokia in 1994 and served in several positions including product creation and portfolio before moving to Microsoft Mobile when it was formed 2014. On 19 July 2017 Nummela left the company by "mutual agreement", leading to the president, Seiche, to become acting CEO.

On 15 August 2016, Pekka Rantala, former CEO of Rovio Entertainment, became HMD's chief marketing officer, commenting that Nokia will "rise again." Rantala previously held several positions at Nokia from 1994 to 2011 such as leader of Nokia's European operations.

=== Headquarters ===
HMD were originally based at Building 2 of the Nokia Campus in Karaportti in Espoo, Finland, opposite Nokia Corporation's headquarters. In November 2018, HMD moved to a new premises 3 km (1.9 mi) away in Bertel Jungin aukio, a square named after Finnish-Swede architect Bertel Jung. The same building also houses TNS Mobile Oy, a subsidiary of FIH Mobile which distributes HMD Global's products. HMD's other main offices are located in London, United Kingdom; Noida, India and Dubai, UAE.

== Products and services ==
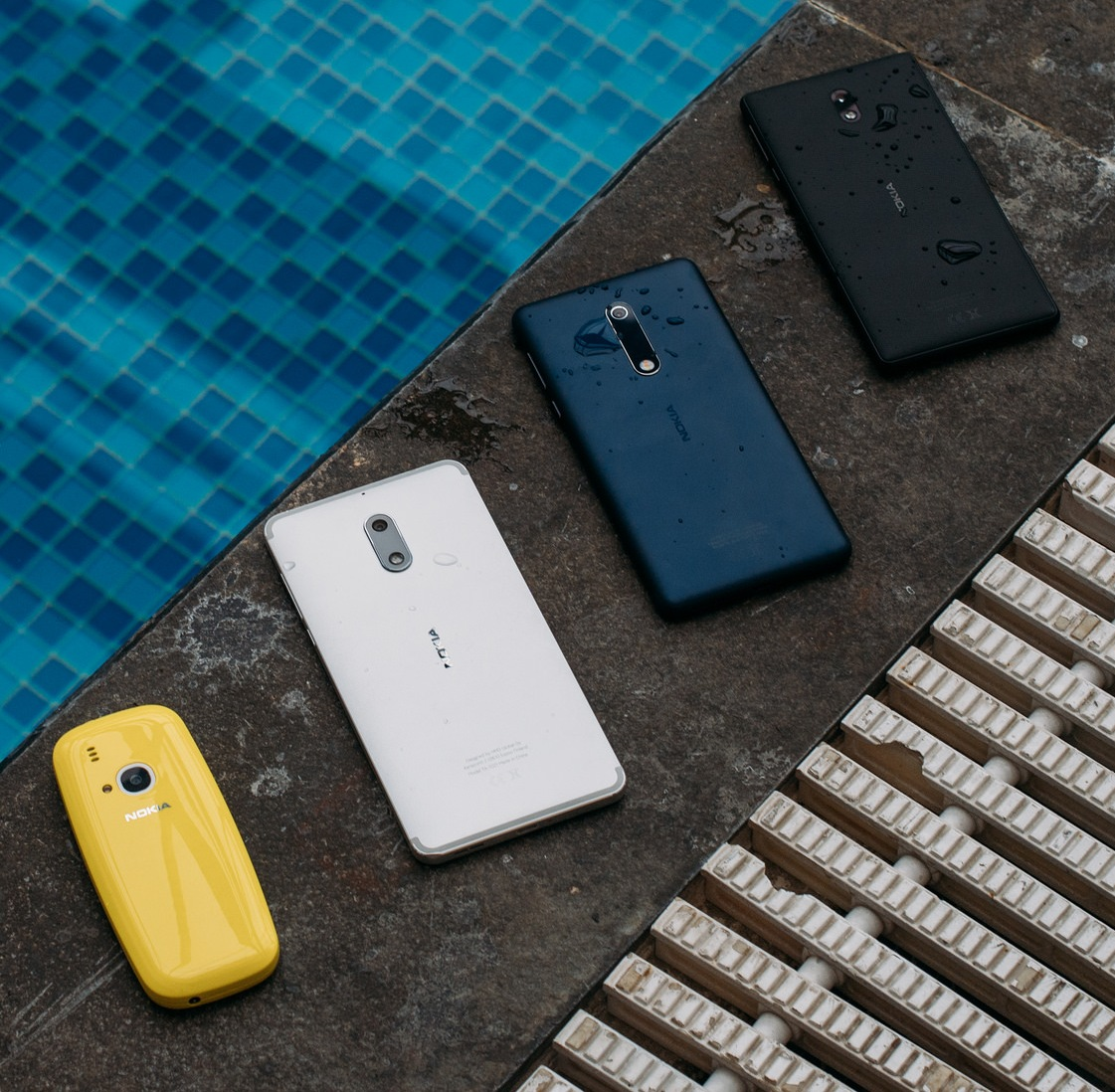
The original early 2017 lineup: Nokia 3310, 6, 5, and 3

HMD Global has released numerous Nokia phones across different categories. Initially the company also developed flagship-level smartphones, but following lukewarm sales of its Nokia 9 PureView (2019), they have since focused more on mid-tier and entry-level smartphones, where they have found more success. The company is a major manufacturer of "feature phones" and is also notable for its Nokia Originals series of modern revivals of older handsets. Beginning in 2024, the company has started to release self-brand HMD smartphones running Android, replacing the Nokia brand in this segment.

== See also ==
- Jolla, a mobile phone company with former Nokia's MeeGo staff
