= Nokia Lumia McLaren =

Unreleased smartphone model

- Brand: Lumia
- Manufacturer: Microsoft Mobile (formerly Nokia)
- Type: Smartphone
- First released: Never released
- Predecessor: Nokia Lumia 930; Nokia Lumia 1020
- Successor: Microsoft Lumia 950; Microsoft Lumia 950 XL
- Form factor: Slate
- Operating system: Windows Phone 8.1 Update 1
- CPU: Qualcomm Snapdragon 800 (MSM8974) 2.3GHz quad-core processor
- GPU: Adreno 330
- Memory: 2 GB
- Storage: 32 GB
- Removable storage: microSD up to 128 GB
- Rear camera: 20 MP (estimated) PureView sensor with Zeiss optics, optical image stabilisation and a dual-LED flash.
- Front camera: 2 MP
- Display: 5.5-inch Full HD LCD with projected-capacitive touch technology (unconfirmed)
- Connectivity: Micro-USB, 3.5mm audio jack
- Codename: McLaren (formerly Goldfinger)

The Nokia Lumia McLaren is an unreleased smartphone developed by Nokia and Microsoft Mobile that utilised a new technology dubbed "3D Touch" (a feature that is unrelated and not the same as the 3D Touch feature that was introduced on the iPhone 6s in late-2015).

Rumors of the McLaren dated back to November 2013. At this point, the phone was actually originally codenamed "Goldfinger", but the name was changed to McLaren later during development. McLaren was eventually cancelled in July 2014, merely four months before its supposed launch in the November of that year. Had the phone not been cancelled, Lumia McLaren could have officially been launched as successor for Lumia 1020. The cancellation left Lumia 1020 have no direct successor and no new Lumia flagship until October 2015. Lumia 1020 only got its "spiritual successor" in February 2019 with the launch of Nokia 9 PureView.

== Hardware ==
The final prototypes of the McLaren featured a grey metal body with a polycarbonate strip along the bottom, likely for radio transparency for the antennas. However, apart from grey ones, silver and full black prototypes have also been built. Daniel Rubino of Windows Central described the device as a "cross between the Lumia 1020 and the Lumia 925". Since the device is a sealed unit, there is a door for the microSD card and the nano SIM. However, in some prototypes with earlier RM-XXXX number, but newer hardware revision number (0151 instead of the 0101 ones that have one door only), there are two separate doors, one for the nanoSIM and one for the storage expansion card. Some RM-XXXX numbers include the RM-1001, RM-1002, RM-1003, RM-1004, RM-1050, RM-1051 and RM-1052.

=== Internals ===
The McLaren featured a 2.3 GHz Qualcomm Snapdragon 800 MSM8974 quad-core SoC which also contains an Adreno 330 GPU. This SoC is paired with 2 GB of RAM and 32 GB of internal storage, which can be expanded with microSD cards up to 128 GB in size. It also comes with the non-replaceable Microsoft Battery BV-F4A, 2600mAh.

=== Display ===
McLaren had a 5.5 in (140 mm) LCD with a resolution of 1080x1920 (Full HD) and a 16:9 aspect ratio. The pixel density of this display is 401 ppi. It is unknown which protective glass comes with the Lumia 1030 (probably Gorilla Glass 3 or later). Depending on the firmware installed, it also comes with features that were found on other Lumias, like Glance Screen, double tap and super-sensitive touch (use with gloves).

The display of McLaren is also reported to incorporate projected-capacitive touch technology, which enables the software-driven "3D Touch" features, including the ability to hover over tiles on the Start screen to expand their contents.

=== Camera ===
The McLaren features a PureView-branded rear-facing camera with a resolution of somewhere within the 20 MP range. The in-built camera software, just like on the lumia 1020 shoots only in PureView mode (5-8MP range), with only few settings. However, with the Lumia Camera, the maximum resolution goes up to about 19-20MP (4:3), with the possibility to capture double images as well, like on the lumia 1020 (5MP PureView jpeg + full resolution jpeg or 5MP jpeg + full resolution dng, which is RAW image). Like the Lumia 1020, McLaren also had a large camera "hump", which contained Microsoft's proprietary optical image stabilization hardware (this hardware was later reduced in size for the Lumia 950 and the Lumia 950 XL).

== Software ==
The Lumia McLaren would have originally been released with Windows Phone 8.1 Update 1 with the later potential to upgrade to Windows 10 Mobile. However, due to the 3D Touch technology and software that was incorporated into McLaren, this is unlikely to be ever feasible.

=== 3D Touch ===
One of McLaren's reputed "killer" features was a technology known as "3D Touch" that allowed the user to interact with the phone using gestures. Sensors contained within the device's body and screen enabled new interactions, which mainly centred around the user hovering their finger over the display in order to reveal certain contextual menus or other additional functions.

On the Start screen, 3D Touch allows the user to hover their finger over a live tile and for that tile to "explode" revealing many smaller tiles contained within – this feature was dubbed MixView. On the near-final prototype hardware, MixView worked with very few apps (only the stock Phone app and Internet Explorer), but the original idea was to allow for developers to make use of exploding live tiles in their own apps.

Other 3D Touch features include the ability to:

- keep the screen of the phone on whilst the user is holding the device
- lock the rotation of the screen if the phone is held in a certain way
- silence incoming calls by gripping the phone or waving a hand over the display
- answer incoming calls by also waving a hand
- mute the speakerphone by holding a hand over the lower half of the display (where the in-built microphone is located)
- display additional UI elements only when a finger is close to the respective area of the display
- adapt the user interface depending on how the user holds the device
- provide gesture-based controls for games
