= Lumia imaging apps =

Imaging applications for Lumia devices

The icons of Lumia branded apps for Windows Phone

Lumia imaging apps are imaging applications by Microsoft Mobile and formerly by Nokia for Lumia devices built on the technology of Scalado (except for Lumia Panorama which was developed earlier by Nokia originally for Symbian and MeeGo devices). The Lumia imaging applications were notably all branded with "Nokia" in front of their names, but after Microsoft acquired Nokia's devices and services business the Nokia branding was superseded with "Lumia", and often updates included nothing but name changes, but for the Lumia Camera this included a new wide range of feature additions. Most of the imaging applications are developed by the Microsoft Lund division. As part of the release of Windows 10 Mobile and the integration of Lumia imaging features into the Windows Camera and Microsoft Photos applications, some of these applications stopped working in October 2015.

== Lumia Camera ==
Lumia Camera (previously Nokia Camera) originally created as a merger of the Nokia Pro Cam and Nokia Smart Cam as the new Nokia Camera application that was introduced with the Lumia Black update. The Nokia Camera as introduced in 2013 offers 3 basic modes: Camera Mode, Smart Mode and Video Mode. In Smart Mode, users can take multiple shots at once in what's called a burst and allows for the removal of objects within the frames, change faces and create "sequence shots". The Camera Mode features a Night and a Sports mode, and Video Mode offers video recording. Due to the high end specs of the Nokia Lumia 1020 and the Nokia Lumia 1520, they received Raw DNG support.

With Lumia Cyan, Nokia improved the low-light performances of the Nokia Camera, added continuous autofocus, added support for living images, and has improved the performance of the application. With Lumia Denim, Microsoft rebranded the application to the Lumia Camera and launched version 5.0 which included a lot of new features, but was limited to high end Lumia devices with PureView technology only. Alongside the launch of the Lumia Camera, the Lumia Beta Apps' Nokia Camera Beta app was rebranded as the Lumia Camera Classic for the Nokia Lumia 830, Nokia Lumia 930, Nokia Lumia ICON, and Nokia Lumia 1520.

The Lumia Camera 5.0 included new features such as faster shooting capabilities; 4K-quality video recording, which captures 24 frames per second and each individual frame consists of an 8.3 megapixel shot; and Rich Capture, that adds Auto HDR and Dynamic Flash. Due to the nature of these features, they haven't been made available for cheaper and older Lumia devices and are exclusive to newer handsets.

In August 2015, it was reported that the Lumia Camera was no longer an exclusive application to Nokia and Microsoft Lumia devices and could be downloaded on other Windows Phone devices, but would lack several features such as High Dynamic Range (HDR), Dynamic Exposure, and Dynamic Flash which were more bound to Lumia hardware than software.

The ownership of the Lumia Camera UI has been transferred to HMD Global, and it was introduced as part of Nokia Pro Camera in February 2018.

== Lumia Cinemagraph ==
Lumia Cinemagraph
- Original author: Nokia (Scalado)
- Developers: Microsoft Mobile Oy, formerly Nokia
- Operating system: Windows Phone
- Platform: Smartphone
- Type: Cinemagraph
- License: Proprietary

Lumia Cinemagraph (earlier Nokia Cinemagraph) is an application and Windows Phone camera lens formerly by Nokia and now by Microsoft, which is bundled with its Lumia Windows Phone smartphones. Nokia Cinemagraph was originally based on technology from the Nokia acquisition of Scalado. The software enables the creation of subtle animated GIFs (or cinemagraphs) from images, which can contain stationary and moving components in the same picture. Despite saving files as GIFs, they're exported as regular JPG files and shared Lumia cinemagraphs can not be viewed on other devices.

It was renamed to Lumia cinemagraph after the acquisition of Nokia's Devices and Services units by Microsoft in 2014.

The Lumia Beta Apps division launched the Lumia Cinemagraph Beta which migrated content from Nokia's website to Microsoft OneDrive and subsequently implemented this feature in Lumia Cinemagraph. Previously cinemagraphs used to be synchronized via the Nokia Memories site.

== Lumia Creative Studio ==
Lumia Creative Studio (previously Nokia Creative Studio) is an imaging editing application that lets users edit photographs and merge them into panoramas, apply after effects with photo filters such as sketching, night vision, dreamy, cartoon, color and silkscreen. The Nokia Creative Studio was later updated to let users edit and create new photographs directly using the built-in camera, and added cropping, adjusting, and Instagram-like effects, additional features include face warps and live styles these filters let users edit the viewfinder in near real-time. Images created using the Lumia Creative Studio can be shared on various social networks like Twitter, Flickr, and Facebook. Nokia Creative Studio 6 introduced non-destructive editing which allows users to work and rework images an unlimited number of times, more features added in version 6 include rotation, straightening, and changing the aspect ratio.

== Lumia Panorama ==
Lumia Panorama (previously Nokia Panorama) was a Lumia app that originated on Symbian and MeeGo, it allows users to make panoramas in both portrait and landscape mode and directly share them on Facebook and Twitter. In September 2015, Microsoft announced that they would no longer release updates or support for Lumia Panorama.

== Lumia Play To ==
Lumia Play To (previously Nokia Play To and Play To) is a DLNA-based application, it allows users to share media across devices. It was originally debuted on Symbian handsets and was introduced in the Nokia Beta Labs in 2012 for Lumia handsets.

== Lumia Refocus ==
Lumia Refocus (previously Nokia Refocus) was revealed at the Nokia World event in Abu Dhabi in 2013 exclusive to Lumia devices with Nokia PureView capabilities, it featured the ability to alter the focus of pictures after you've already taken them. When launched, it started up in camera mode and is able to do analyses between the scenes and takes between two and eight photos that allows the user to refocus it afterwards. furthermore, it has social network sharing built in. In September 2015, Microsoft announced that they would discontinue the online service related to Lumia Refocus on October 30, 2015 and would remove the application from the Windows Phone Store.

== Lumia Selfie ==
Lumia Selfie (previously Nokia Glam Me) is a "selfie"-based application that can use both the front and main cameras, it offers facial recognition (but has trouble recognizing faces wearing eyeglasses) and can edit "selfies" by giving the user a bigger smile, whiter teeth, enlarge their eyes, change color, and adjust the picture brightness. In August 2015 Microsoft added support for selfie sticks.

== Lumia Share ==
Lumia Share (previously Nokia Share) is a photo synchronisation application for Windows and Windows Phone designed to connect Nokia Lumia smartphone to the Nokia Lumia 2520, it shares photos through the Lumia Storyteller app and needs to connect over WiFi, it works exclusively with the Nokia Lumia 2520 and doesn't work with any other Microsoft Windows device.

== Lumia Storyteller ==
Lumia Storyteller (previously Nokia Storyteller) was a scrapbooking app for Windows Phone that automatically clusters photos and videos taken on a Lumia device in the form of visual stories. It integrates with Here maps to show where every individual photograph and video clip has been taken. In September 2015, Microsoft announced that they would discontinue Lumia Storyteller and its associated online service on October 30, 2015 as some of its features would be implemented in the Windows 10 Photos app.

== Lumia Video Trimmer ==
Lumia Video Trimmer (previously Nokia Video Trimmer) is a video editing application originally launched by Nokia, it allows users to edit and share videos recorded on their Lumia devices.

== Movie Creator Beta ==
Movie Creator Beta (previously Nokia Video Director though the Nokia Video Director application is still published in the Windows Phone Store as a separate client) is a video creation application launched by Microsoft Mobile in 2014 for Windows and Windows Phone. It allows users to merge photographs, video clips, music samples and text into movies. It features unlimited video length (though it's limited by a total of 25 content slots), pan-and-zoom, and offers various filters and themes, some of which include DreamWorks' Kung Fu Panda and Madagascar movies. It offers compatibility with content created on other devices, though it should first be moved to the device on which Movie Creator is installed before these can be edited.

In April 2015, Movie Creator Beta was updated with Microsoft OneDrive and 4K video support.

== Microsoft Photos Add-ins ==
Microsoft Photos Add-ins (previously called Lumia Moments) is a Lumia Denim enabled feature that can take frames from videos and turn them into individual pictures, due to the processing power it requires, only the Nokia Lumia ICON, Nokia Lumia 1520, Nokia Lumia 830, and Nokia Lumia 930 devices can run the software as the Lumia Imaging SDK integrates with newer Qualcomm Snapdragon processors. Lumia Moments has 2 types of images that it can create, one is the Best Frame which saves a photo as a "living image" and can be viewed in motion from Windows Phone's camera roll or Lumia Storyteller, and the other is Action Shots that lets users add strobe effects and blur the pictures.

With Windows 10 Mobile, Microsoft decided to quietly rebranded the Lumia Moments application. The removal of the Lumia branding happened at the same time as the discontinuation of several Lumia imaging applications.

== PhotoBeamer ==
PhotoBeamer (previously Nokia PhotoBeamer) was an imaging application originally created by Scalado and ported to Windows Phone after the Nokia acquisition, it lets users send an image from their Lumia device to any display as long as it's connected to the internet. When beamed, the application would ask the user to go to the PhotoBeamer application on the other internet-capable device (including other mobile phones, tablets, notebooks, and smart TVs). The PhotoBeamer site would show a QR Code that asks the user to scan it with Bing Vision and download the application from the Windows Phone Store. In September 2015, Microsoft announced that they would discontinue the PhotoBeamer application and its associated web page as they would integrate some of its features in Windows 10.

== Smart Shoot ==
Smart Shoot (previously Nokia Smart Shoot) is a camera application which lets users capture selected parts of a photo by using a lens for the camera app that takes a number of photos in quick succession, then lets users select "the best" moments from each individual image. Smart Shoot can select faces from various succeeding images, so if one person blinks during a single shot and doesn't blink during the next, the user can choose the faces they prefer for the picture. Smart Shoot can be launched through the application picker or via the Microsoft Camera's lenses. When attempting to take a shot the app will enquire the user to hold the phone steady. If the picture is correctly taken users may remove objects and people from it.

== Video Upload ==
Video Uploader (previously Nokia Video Upload) was a YouTube-based video uploader that let Lumia users upload their videos to YouTube. Initially, it was only launched for the Nokia Lumia 1020, but later expanded to additional devices. In September 2015, Microsoft announced that they would no longer update nor support the Video Upload application; existing installations could still be used, but the app would immediately be removed from the Windows Phone Store.

== Video Tuner ==
Video Tuner (previously Nokia Video Tuner) is a video editing application that enables trimming, slowing down footage, brightening the video's colors, adding music to frames, applying filters, rotating, cropping and sharing directly shared to Instagram. The software integrates with the Lumia Imaging SDK that enables developers to create similar editing software in their own applications.

== See also ==
- Microsoft Lumia
- Lumia Beta Apps
- PureView
- Pixel Camera
- Microsoft mobile services
