= Nokia Lumia 735 =

2014 smartphone by Nokia

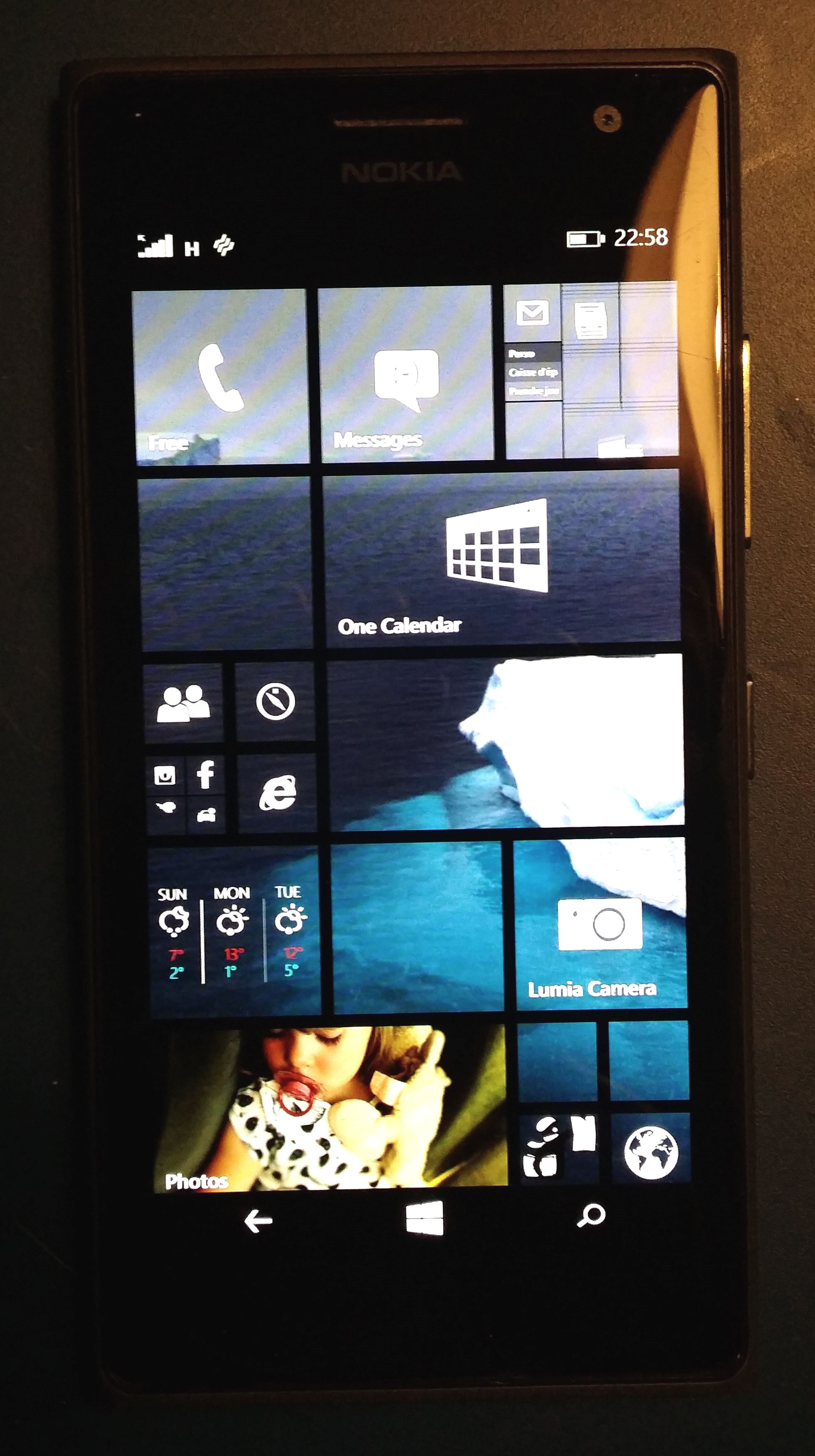
- Brand: Nokia
- Manufacturer: Microsoft Mobile
- Type: Smartphone
- Series: Lumia
- First released: September 4, 2014
- Discontinued: 2017
- Predecessor: Nokia Lumia 720
- Related: Nokia Lumia 530; Nokia Lumia 630; Nokia Lumia 830; Nokia Lumia 1520; Nokia Lumia Icon
- Compatible networks: GSM/GPRS/EDGE 850/900/1800/1900; HSPA+ 850/900/2100; LTE800/1800/2600; Wi-Fi b/g/n
- Form factor: Touchscreen
- Dimensions: 134.7 mm (5.30 in) H 68.5 mm (2.70 in) W 8.9 mm (0.35 in) D
- Weight: 134 g (5 oz)
- Operating system: Windows Phone 8.1 with Lumia Denim, upgradable to Windows 10 Mobile
- System-on-chip: Qualcomm Snapdragon 400 MSM8926
- CPU: 1.2 GHz quad core ARM Cortex-A7
- GPU: Qualcomm Adreno 305 clocked at 450MHz
- Memory: 1 GB
- Storage: 8 GB internal flash
- Removable storage: MicroSD (up to 128 GB)
- Battery: Removable 2220 mAh Li-poly battery with Qi wireless charging
- Rear camera: 6.7 MP, ZEISS optics, 3088×2144 pixels, 1080p Full HD video capture @ 30fps f/1.9
- Front camera: 5 MP, 1080p (FHD, 1920 x 1080), 2560×1920 pixels
- Display: 4.7 in AMOLED 720p with Clearblack display technology and Corning Gorilla Glass 3 protection
- Connectivity: List: Wi-Fi :802.11 a/b/g/n; Wi-Fi-based positioning system (WPS); GPS/GLONASS; SA-GPS NFC; Bluetooth 4.0; Micro-USB 2.0
- Data inputs: Multi-touch capacitive touchscreen, Magnetometer, proximity sensor, 3D-Accelerometer
- Model: Lumia 735
- Website: Nokia Lumia 735 and Nokia Lumia 730 Dual SIM

The Nokia Lumia 735 Is a Windows 8.1 smartphone developed by Nokia. It was unveiled on September 4, 2014, at IFA Berlin, alongside the Lumia 730. This device is a smartphone with particular emphasis on selfies, aided by a 5-megapixel, wide-angle front-facing camera.

== Specifications ==
=== Hardware ===
The Nokia Lumia 735 has a 1.2 GHz quad-core ARM Cortex-A7 (Qualcomm Snapdragon 400 MSM8926), ⁣, a Qualcomm Adreno 305 GPU and 1 GB of system RAM. The Nokia Lumia 735 and Nokia Lumia 730 Dual SIM had 8 GB internal storage capacity, and supported microSD expansion. The battery is removable, and a 128 GB capable mini-SD card slot was provided along with wireless charging capability.

In May 2015, Microsoft released a Microsoft-branded version of the device (exclusive to Verizon in the US) with improved hardware (16 GB internal storage versus 8 GB). This version ran a later version of the software.

=== Software ===
The Nokia Lumia 735 was released in 2014 running the Windows 8.1 Mobile operating system which is upgradable to Windows 10 Mobile. Both the camera and video capture modes included a 'Pro' function which included HDR for the camera and editing abilities. The Cortana voice assistant allowed hands-free voice enabled instructions. Microsoft Cloud enabled services were integrated into the handset.

== Variants ==
Model	Lumia 730 Dual SIM	Lumia 735
Network	GSM 850/900/1800/1900; HSDPA 850/900/1900/2100	GSM 850/900/1800/1900; HSDPA 850/900/1900/2100; LTE 800/1800/2600
Dimensions	134.7 mm (5.30 in) H 68.5 mm (2.70 in) W 8.7 mm (0.34 in) D	134.7 mm (5.30 in) H 68.5 mm (2.70 in) W 8.9 mm (0.35 in) D
Weight	130.4 g	134.3 g

== See also ==
- Microsoft Lumia
- Nokia Lumia 730
