= PureView =

Nokia camera technology

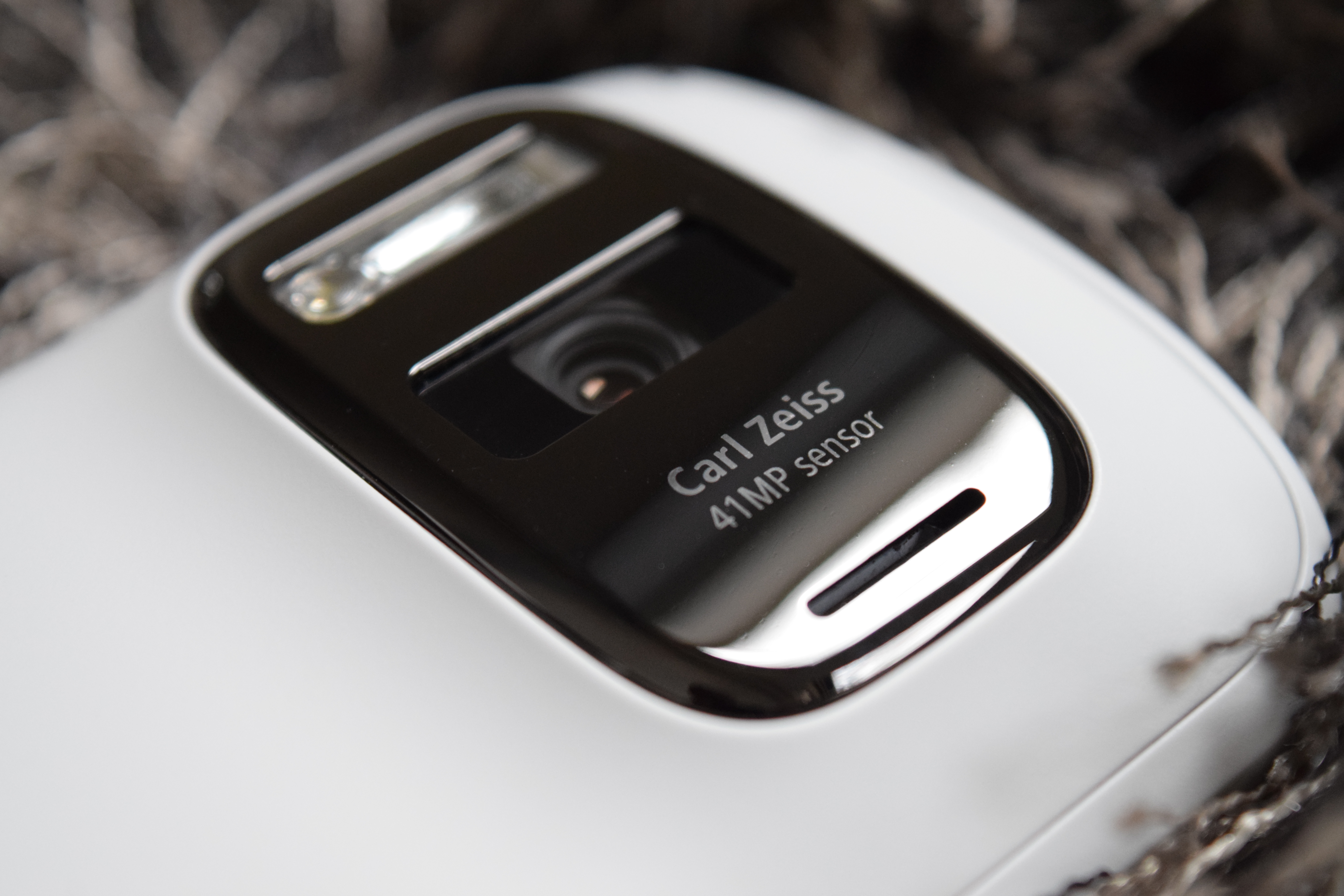
Nokia 808 PureView with a 41-megapixel camera and features a Carl Zeiss lens.

Nokia PureView is the branding of a combination of technologies used in cameras of Nokia-branded smartphones and previously, in phones by Microsoft Mobile. PureView was first introduced with the Nokia 808 PureView.

== Hardware ==
PureView cameras have on-chip image processors that perform image scaling with oversampling, allowing additional digital zoom, and reduced noise compared to a typical smartphone camera. Both are combined with xenon flash, a 1080p HD video camera, and high-resolution Zeiss all-aspherical 1-group lenses. Unlike the Nokia 808, the Nokia Lumia 1020 — along with other Lumia PureView smartphone cameras — possesses optical image stabilization, which became standard in Lumia PureView bundling. The Nokia 808 does, however, compensate with its own exclusive camera-complementing media features, such as Micro HDMI TV-out, and built-in video editing.

== History ==
Following the acquisition of the Nokia Devices & Services division by Microsoft, the U.S. software company acquired the PureView name and trademark, but not the related imaging technology, which remained with Nokia, who, as a result, licensed it to Microsoft.

Since Microsoft's ownership, the technology has only been used in their late-2015 flagship Lumia 950.

In late August 2018, HMD Global reportedly acquired the ownership of the PureView trademark and related assets not under Nokia ownership.

On 24 February 2019, HMD Global, the exclusive licensee of Nokia-branded phones, launched the Nokia 9 PureView at the 2019 Mobile World Congress in Barcelona.

On 19 March 2020, HMD Global announced the Nokia 8.3 5G, which is said to feature a 64MP PureView Quad-Camera System with Carl Zeiss Optics.

The Nokia X30 5G was announced on 2 September 2022 with PureView technology, but the ZEISS lens is absent due to HMD Global ending its partnership with Carl Zeiss AG. The X30 features a 50 MP main sensor, which is the same as the Samsung Galaxy S22.

== Reception ==
At its initial debut with the Nokia 808 PureView, the PureView camera was acknowledged by critics as one of the most advanced smartphone cameras in the market. Critics also said it made devices bulky and heavy, and that the low-resolution screen on the 808 PureView made appreciating the camera's capabilities much harder.

Nokia was given several awards for the release of its PureView camera, including the TIPA Best Imaging Innovation award in 2012.

== Models ==
=== Symbian Belle ===
- Nokia 808 PureView

=== Windows Phone 8 ===
- Nokia Lumia 920
- Nokia Lumia 925
- Nokia Lumia 928
- Nokia Lumia Icon
- Nokia Lumia 1020
- Nokia Lumia 1520

=== Windows Phone 8.1 ===
- Nokia Lumia 830
- Nokia Lumia 930
- Nokia Lumia McLaren (never released)

=== Windows Mobile 10 ===
- Microsoft Lumia 950 and 950 XL

=== Android ===
- Nokia 9 PureView (Android One based on Android Pie 9.0)
- Nokia 8.3 5G (Android One based on Android 10)
- Nokia X30 5G (Android 12)

== See also ==
- Microsoft Lumia
- Lumia imaging apps
