= Nokia Talkman 320F =

1984 car phone

- Manufacturer: Nokia
- First released: August 1984
- Availability by region: not available
- Compatible networks: NMT 450
- Form factor: car phone
- Weight: 4,700 g (166 oz)
- Storage: 184 names
- Battery: stand by (10 h) talk time (60 min)
- Display: Monochrome LCD
- Development status: discontinued

The Nokia Talkman 320F is a car phone which is discontinued. It was released in August 1984, after the release of Nokia Actionman and Nokia Actionman II. Its features are the same as the previous two versions. It has a storage memory of 184 contacts. It used the NMT 450 network. The phone is a heavy model Nokia weighing about 4.7 kg. Its monochrome LCD is suitable for displaying contacts. The battery gives a stand by backup up to 10 hours and a talk time up to 60 minutes.
