= Nokia Actionman II =

Revised edition of Nokia Actionman

- Manufacturer: Nokia
- First released: May 1984
- Availability by region: not available
- Form factor: car phone
- Display: monochrome LCD
- Data inputs: numeric keypad
- Development status: discontinued

The Nokia Actionman II is a revised edition of Nokia Actionman. It was launched in May 1984, 6 months after the launch of Actionman. It used the NMT 450 network. It has a monochromic LCD display. This car phone only supports calling features. Multimedia and Messaging are not supported by the Actionman. It has 100 channels which can be changed via the advanced numeric keypad of the mobile. The phone has a signal indicator to indicate the signal and frequency.
