= Nokia Lumia =

Discontinued line of mobile devices by Microsoft

Nokia Lumia / Microsoft Lumia

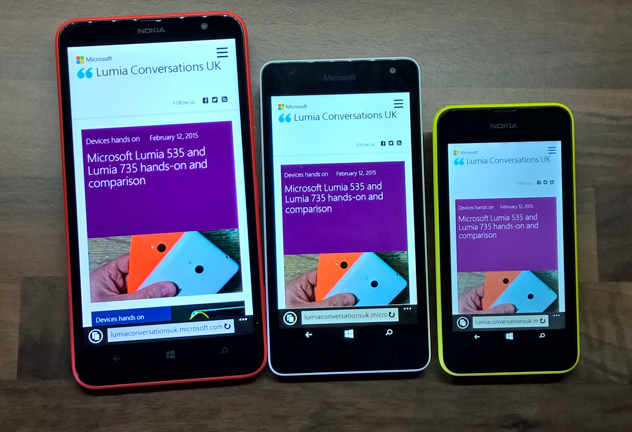
- Nokia Lumia logo used until 2014 (Top) and various Nokia and Microsoft branded Lumia devices (Bottom). From left to right, the Lumia 1320, the Lumia 535, and the Lumia 530.
- Manufacturers: Nokia (2011–2014); Microsoft Mobile (2014–2017)
- Type: Smartphone, Phablet, Tablet
- Availability by region: November 2011 (Europe); January 2012 (elsewhere)
- Discontinued: October 2017
- Predecessor: Nokia Nseries; Nokia Eseries; Microsoft Kin
- Successor: Nokia Mobile/HMD Global (Nokia); Microsoft Surface Duo (Microsoft); HMD Skyline (HMD Global)
- Related: List of Windows 10 Mobile devices List of Windows Phone devices List of Nokia products
- Form factor: Slate
- Operating system: Windows 10 Mobile, Windows Phone
- CPU: Qualcomm Snapdragon
- Data inputs: Touchscreen
- Development status: Discontinued
- Website: Microsoft Lumia at the Wayback Machine (archived 31 January 2019)

Nokia Lumia, later rebranded to Microsoft Lumia, is a discontinued line of mobile devices that was originally designed and marketed by Nokia and later by Microsoft Mobile. Introduced on 26 October 2011, the line was the result of a long-term partnership between Nokia and Microsoft—as such, Lumia smartphones run on Microsoft software, the Windows Phone operating system; and later the newer Windows 10 Mobile. The Lumia name is derived from the partitive plural form of the Finnish word lumi, meaning "snow".

The series debuted with the Nokia Lumia 800 and the Lumia 710 smartphones. In April 2012, the first high-end flagship, Nokia Lumia 900, was released in the US in partnership with AT&T, backed by a major marketing push. Its later flagships included the Nokia Lumia 920, 925, and the first phablet-style model, Nokia Lumia 1520. However, its most successful model was in the lower-end, the budget Nokia Lumia 520, released in April 2013. In July 2013, Nokia introduced the Lumia 1020 with a 41-megapixel sensor, considered to be one of the most iconic Nokia handsets. One tablet computer was also released in the Lumia line, the Nokia Lumia 2520, running Windows RT.

Microsoft, the developer of Windows Phone software, purchased Nokia's mobile device business in April 2014, as a result leading to the Lumia line's maintenance being transferred to Microsoft Mobile. As part of the transition, Microsoft continued to use the Nokia brand on Lumia devices until October 2014, when it began to officially phase it out in favor of Microsoft branding, and in November 2014 announced the first Microsoft branded Lumia product, the Microsoft Lumia 535. In October 2015, Microsoft announced the first Lumia devices running on Windows 10 Mobile: the flagship Lumia 950, Lumia 950 XL and Lumia 550. The most recent Lumia device, the Microsoft Lumia 650, was announced in February 2016.

Sales decreased sharply after the introduction of Windows 10, with sales estimated to have dropped below one million units by the end of 2016. In October 2017, Microsoft's corporate vice president, Joe Belfiore, confirmed that Microsoft would no longer sell or manufacture new Windows 10 Mobile devices. The existing devices would receive bug fixes and security updates only, ending for the latest devices in December 2019. The last smartphone from Microsoft was the Surface Duo 2, under the Surface brand.

In 2024, HMD Global released HMD Skyline, a smartphone with a similar hardware design to the Lumia series, but running on Android instead of Windows Phone.

== History ==
From 1998 to 2012, Nokia was the largest vendor of mobile phones in the world, which included early smartphones built on its Symbian platform. However, in later years, its market share declined as a result of the growing use of touchscreen smartphones from other vendors, such as Apple's iPhone line and Android-based products. In 2010, its market share had declined to 28%, and in April 2012, Samsung Electronics (a major user of Android) overtook Nokia as the largest mobile phone vendor in the world. Nokia's CEO Stephen Elop vetoed the idea of producing Android devices, believing the company would not be able to suitably differentiate its Android products from that of other vendors. In an employee memo, Elop described the company as being on a "burning platform", blaming the "war of ecosystems" between iOS and Android as part of Nokia's overall struggle, and asserting that the company needed to make major changes to its operation.

=== Partnership between Microsoft and Nokia ===
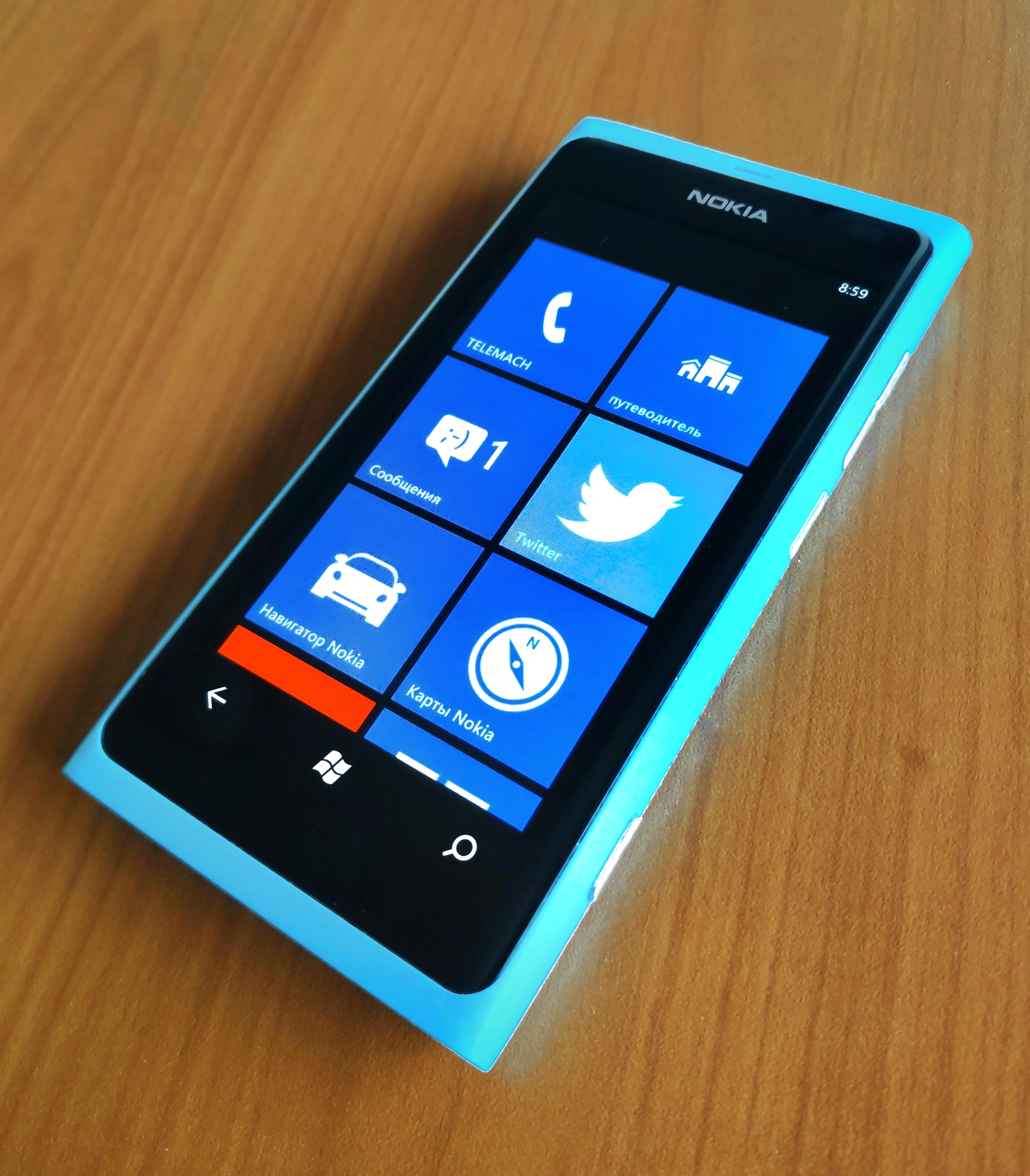
Nokia Lumia 800, the first Lumia device

In February 2011, Stephen Elop and Microsoft's CEO Steve Ballmer jointly announced a major business partnership between Nokia and Microsoft, which would see Nokia adopt Windows Phone as its primary platform on future smartphones, replacing both Symbian and MeeGo. The deal also included the integration of Bing as the search engine on Nokia devices, and the integration of Nokia Maps into Microsoft's own mapping services. Nokia had planned to use the MeeGo platform as part of its future plans prior to the announcement, although the company announced that it would still release one MeeGo device in 2011. Aligning with Microsoft had been considered a possibility by analysts due to Elop's prior employment with the company.

Nokia unveiled its first Windows Phone 7-based devices, the mid-range Lumia 710 and high-end Lumia 800, on 26 October 2011 at its Nokia World conference. Motivated by requests from the U.S. carrier AT&T for an LTE-enabled device, Nokia quickly developed the Lumia 900 as a follow-up, first unveiled at the 2012 International CES. The Lumia 900 received heavy promotion by the carrier as a flagship device, but its launch was dampened by a software bug that prevented the device from connecting to certain mobile data networks, forcing AT&T to issue credits to those who purchased the device. Upon its launch in April 2012, the Lumia 900 was listed as a top seller on Amazon.com, but online sales began to taper off by May. While not revealing further details, a Nokia representative stated that the company was "pleased with the consumer reaction, as well as the support we have received from AT&T", while AT&T's mobility chief Ralph de la Vega stated that the Lumia 900 had "exceeded expectations".

In early 2012, Nokia released the Lumia 610, a new entry-level device taking advantage of the lower system requirements introduced by Windows Phone 7's "Tango" update. These new low-end devices were intended to improve Windows Phone adoption in emerging markets such as China. In June 2012, both Nokia and Microsoft received much criticism after it was revealed that the Windows Phone 7 Lumia devices would not be upgradable to Microsoft's second generation Windows Phone platform, Windows Phone 8. It has been said that those devices would not be upgraded because Windows Phone 8 uses an entirely different kernel (Windows NT). The original Lumia range instead received a different update called Windows Phone 7.8.

Later in September 2012, Nokia unveiled the Lumia 820 and the Lumia 920, its first two devices to use Windows Phone 8. Both featured NFC, with the Lumia 820 embedding a microSD card slot, and an optional Wireless Charging Shell for Qi wireless charging. The Lumia 920 also notably featured Qi wireless charging, and a "PureView" camera with optical image stabilization. While Nokia received criticism when it was revealed that a demonstration video of its image stabilization technology was, in fact, filmed using a professional camera, the Lumia 920 was a commercial success for the company.

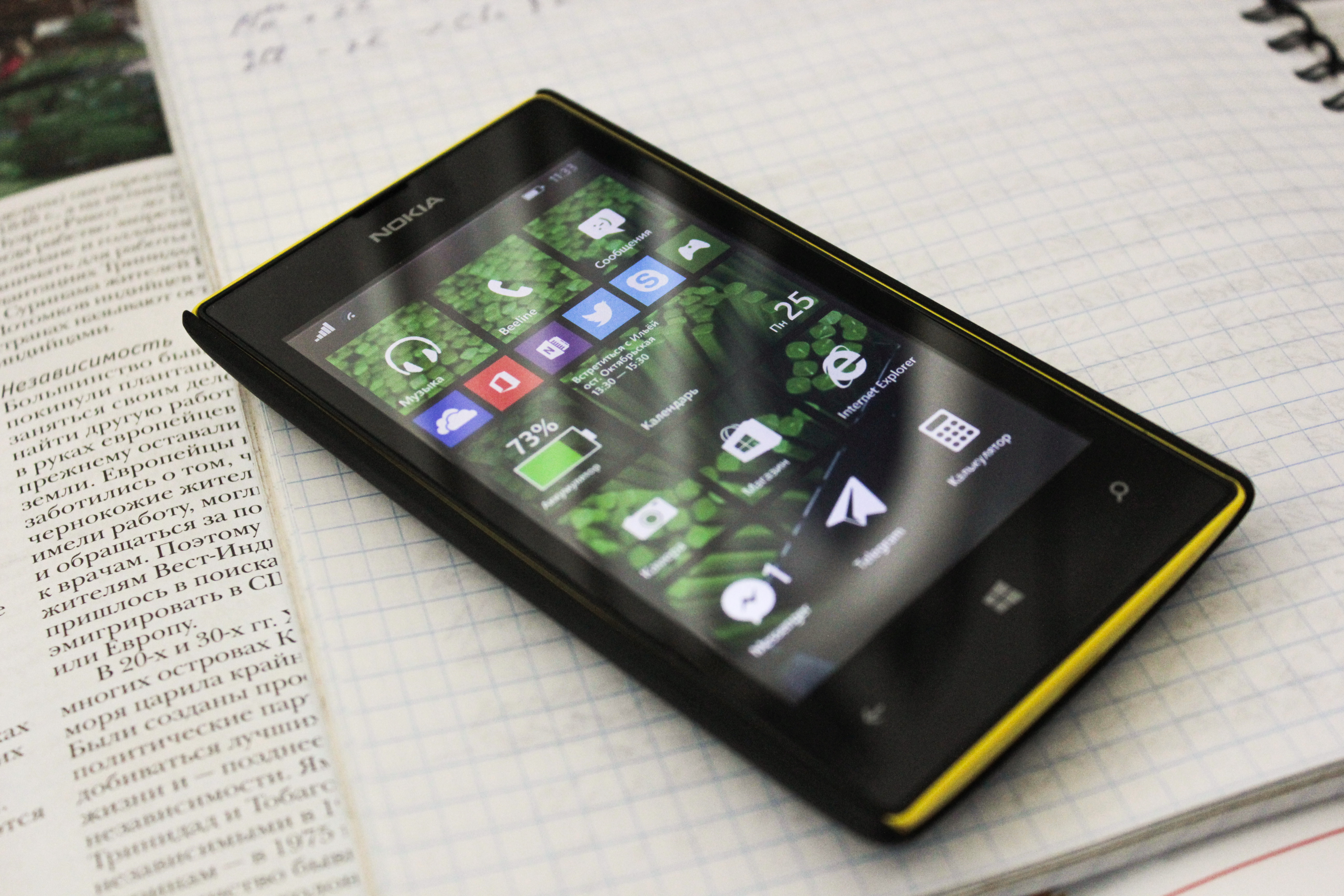
A Nokia Lumia 520

At MWC 2013, Nokia introduced two more Windows Phone 8 devices: the mid-range Nokia Lumia 720 and the budget Nokia Lumia 520, the latter of which has become the highest selling Windows phone device ever. In 2013, Nokia also introduced the Lumia 925, a revised version of the 920 with a slimmer build incorporating aluminium, and the Lumia 1020, which features a 41-megapixel camera based on technology from its Symbian-based 808 PureView. On 22 October 2013, Nokia extended the Lumia brand into the tablet market with the unveiling of the Lumia 2520; running Microsoft's Windows RT operating system, it was the company's first tablet since the Nokia Internet tablet range. Some critics believed that the usage of Windows RT rather than full Microsoft Windows 8.1 led to bad sales, as most major Windows tablet makers have used Windows 8.1 in favour of Windows RT. Alternatively, others have claimed that the device's failure was due to its heavy weight and high price. Lumia 2520 was discontinued in early 2015.

Although sales of the Lumia line had exceeded those of BlackBerry in the same period, Nokia still made an operating loss of €115m, with revenues falling 24% to €5.7bn following the second quarter of 2013. Over the past nine quarters, Nokia sustained €4.1 billion worth of operating losses. In Q3 2013, Lumia sales hit 8.8 million worldwide; over three times higher than the same period the year before; and double the figure in North America compared to the previous quarter. At the same time, overall Windows Phone market share hit double figures in several countries in Europe and other regions.

=== Acquisition of Nokia's mobile phone business ===
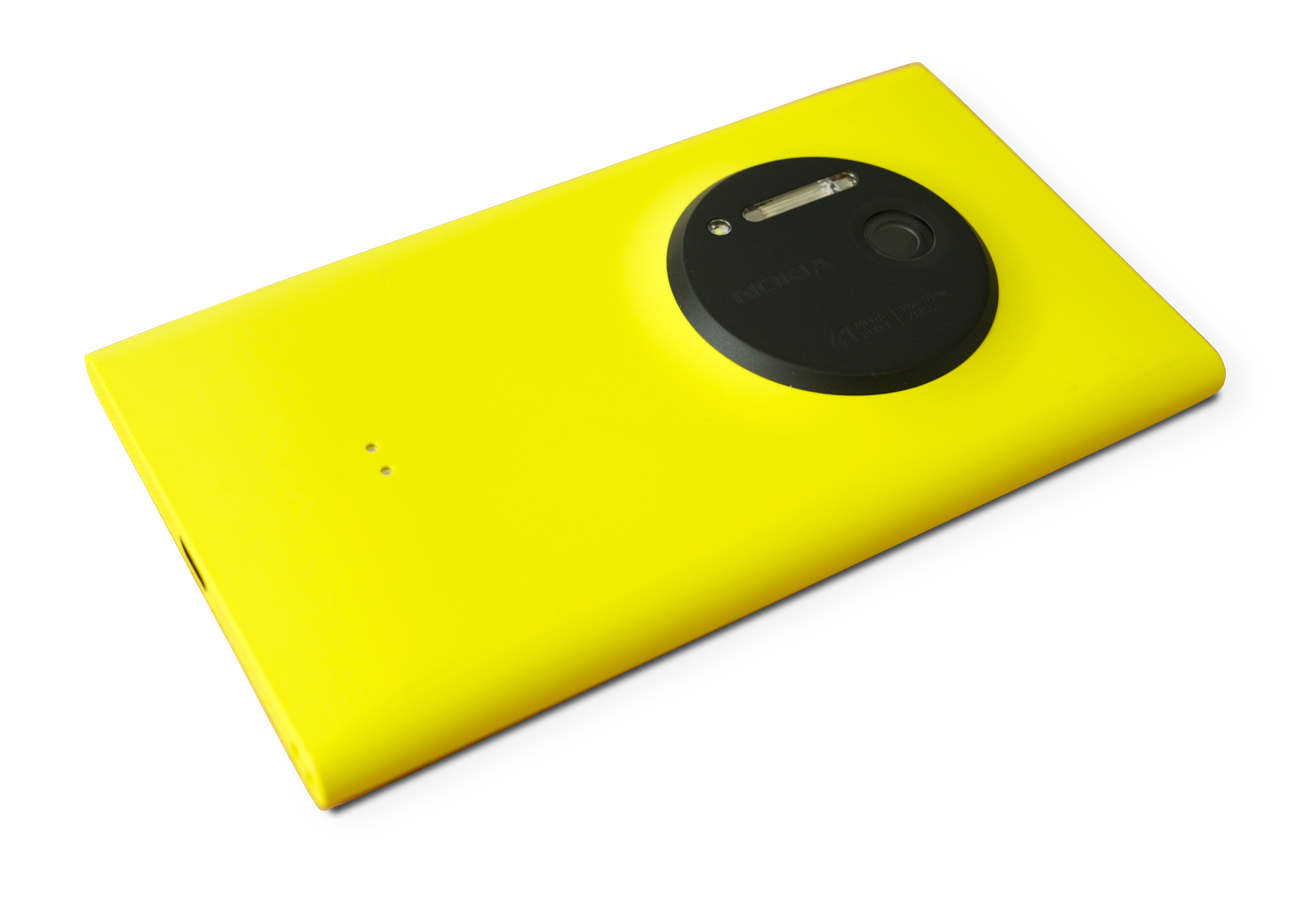
Nokia Lumia 1020 with 41 MP rear camera

On 3 September 2013, Microsoft announced its intent to acquire Nokia's mobile phone business (including rights to the Lumia and low-end Asha brands) in an overall deal of over US$7bn. Stephen Elop stepped down as Nokia's CEO and returned to Microsoft as its head of devices as part of the deal, which closed in early 2014. While Microsoft will license the Nokia name under a 10-year agreement, the company will only be able to use it on feature phones: those running the Series 30, Series 30+ and the Series 40 mobile operating systems based on Java ME and MediaTek technology, respectively. These changes resulted in future Lumia models being first-party hardware produced by Microsoft.

Codenames for Lumia phones developed from late 2013 were based on James Bond movies, including "Moneypenny" (which became Nokia Lumia 630) and "Goldfinger" (which would be the cancelled Lumia "McLaren").

==== Android prototypes ====
On 13 September 2013, the New York Times writer Nick Wingfield revealed that Nokia had been testing the Android operating system on its Lumia hardware. It was one of two known Android projects at the company; the other was running the OS on low–end Asha hardware, which resulted in the Nokia X family of devices. Despite the testing, the Android-based Lumia handsets were never released and only altered Asha devices were brought to the market.

In July 2014, Microsoft announced that it would discontinue the majority of its Nokia-branded devices, including the Asha, S30, S40, and X platforms, in favor of low-cost Lumia devices inheriting their design. This left S30+ as Microsoft's only remaining Nokia-branded phone platform until it was sold to HMD Global in May 2016, who, the following February, would announce the first Nokia-branded true Android phone, the Nokia 6, in January 2017.

=== Under Microsoft ownership ===
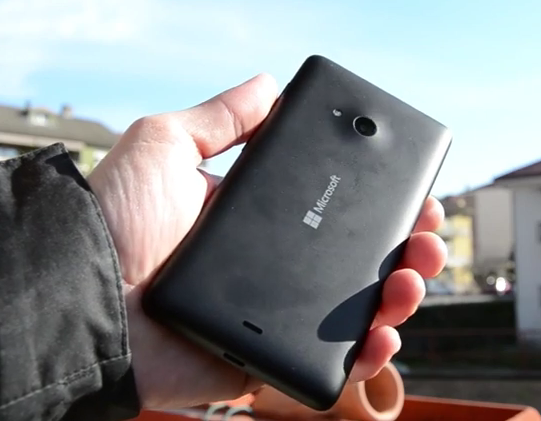
Microsoft Lumia 535, the first Microsoft branded Lumia device

Even after the acquisition of Nokia's mobile device business by Microsoft, several Lumia devices were unveiled by Microsoft Mobile in September 2014 that still carried the Nokia name, including the Lumia 830 and Lumia 735. In July 2014, it had been reported by evleaks that Microsoft was attempting to license the Nokia name in a co-branding scheme, which would have possibly seen future devices branded as "Nokia by Microsoft". As a part of the change of ownership, the social network pages have also been rebranded as Microsoft Lumia rather than Microsoft Mobile; this sought to emphasize the Windows Phone over other Nokia mobile phones while also updating social network pages of Windows Phone to the new Microsoft Lumia branding. To reflect this change, Nokia Conversations was also rebranded as Lumia Conversations, and NokNok.tv to Lumia Conversations UK. However, the rebranding has not been consistent, as the Nokia Army was renamed the Spartan Nation and the support site for legacy phones, accessories, various Nokia-branded devices, and services, originally Nokia Discussions, was renamed the Microsoft Mobile Community. The Lumia Beamer was the last Lumia-branded application to have its URL changed from Nokia to Lumia, signifying the end of the transitional term during which Microsoft was allowed to use Nokia.com and related sites.

Microsoft Lumia logo used after the rebranding, first used in November 2014

However, in October 2014, Microsoft officially announced that it would phase out the Nokia brand in its promotion and production of Lumia smartphones, and that future Lumia models would be branded solely with the name and logo of Microsoft. In November 2014, Microsoft announced its first self-branded phone, Microsoft Lumia 535. Rebranding the Lumia line did not affect sales, though some critics believed that it might negatively influence consumers' decisions due to Nokia's established reputation for durability compared to the relative infancy of Microsoft's brand in the consumer phone space. The Nokia Lumia 638 was the last Lumia product to bear the Nokia brand, and was only released in India in December 2014.

In November 2014, a post by a Microsoft Twitter account stated that all Nokia and Microsoft Lumia smartphones running Windows Phone 8 and 8.1 would receive updates to Windows 10; however, following the official unveiling, Microsoft denied this, stating that they instead were targeting the "majority" of Lumia phones and that not all phones would receive the update or support all of its features. Later, Microsoft confirmed that low-end devices with 512 MB of RAM (including the Nokia Lumia 520, which represents 24.5% of all Windows Phone devices sold), would also get the Windows 10 upgrade, but reaffirmed that not all of its features would be supported on these devices. Additionally, Microsoft stated on January 16, 2015, that low-end Windows Phone 8.1 phones will not get some Lumia Denim features.

In July 2015, Bloomberg reported that Microsoft had a planned restructuring of Microsoft Mobile, which includes the Microsoft Lumia range. This would reportedly include a write down of approximately US$7.6 billion on the acquisition of Nokia's mobile phone business and a layoff of around 7,200 employees. It was also reported that Microsoft would release fewer first-party devices each year. As part of a larger restructuring, the Microsoft Devices & Studios engineering group was merged with the Operating Systems Engineering Group to form the larger Windows & Devices Engineering Group. In July 2015, it was announced that the head of Surface, Panos Panay, would head the new Microsoft devices unit, which would include the Microsoft Lumia as well as various other Microsoft hardware products such as the Band, HoloLens, and Xbox.

In October 2015, Microsoft launched the first Lumia devices running on Windows 10 Mobile: the Lumia 950, Lumia 950 XL and Lumia 550. In February 2016, the Lumia 650, which also runs Windows 10 Mobile, was launched. Sales of Lumia devices declined between fiscal years 2015 and 2016, with phone revenue decreasing by $4.2 billion or 56%. When Microsoft announced the acquisition in September 2013, 7.3 million devices were sold in the quarter, but this shrunk to 1.2 million at the quarter ending June 2016. Since the Lumia series make up 95% of total Windows Phone/Windows 10 Mobile sales, the operating system market share also shrunk along with it. Throughout 2016 Microsoft slowed down production volumes of Lumia devices, and it was speculated that the series would be discontinued by the end of 2016. Microsoft briefly stopped selling Lumia devices from the Microsoft Store at the end of 2016—with sales estimated to have dropped below one million units by the end of 2016.—although availability was restored at the beginning of 2017.

Shortly after the discontinuation of the Elite X3, HP's attempt to bring Windows 10 Mobile to a niche market, Microsoft's corporate vice president Joe Belfiore confirmed that Microsoft would no longer sell or manufacture new mobile devices. The existing devices would receive bug fixes and security updates only. The Lumia 650 was Lumia's last device, although Lumia 750 and 850/650XL were at the last steps before production at the time but ultimately were cancelled. The Lumia 950 was Microsoft Mobile's last Lumia flagship and the last Windows Phone flagship device. A supposed successor called Microsoft Lumia 960 (codenamed Northstar) was reportedly canceled while being in its prototype tests level. The next Microsoft phone release was the Microsoft Surface Duo, while a Windows Phone-powered Surface Neo foldable tablet was cancelled too a few years later, after its introduction.

== Lumia updates ==
Nokia and Microsoft Mobile have released several updates unique to Lumia devices which feature a combination of firmware and software updates. The latter of these include imaging improvements, new technology support, feature updates, and bug fixes. Because Lumia devices exclusively use Windows Phone, major operating system updates are often bundled with the firmware updates upon release.

Similar to how Windows Phones receive operating system updates, Lumia update releases are dependent on carriers who decide if and when devices are to receive them. However, operating system updates are not subject to these constraints if users are part of Microsoft's Windows Insider or Preview for Developers programs.

History of Lumia updates
Release name Code name	Date announced	Concurrent operating system version	Highlights
Lumia Amber	15 August 2013	Windows Phone 8 Update 2 (GDR2)	Default version for Nokia Lumia 625, 925, 928 and 1020 devices, developed by Nokia: Double tap the screen to turn on; New settings and processing algorithms for the Nokia Pro Camera; Tutorial mode for the Nokia Pro Camera; Bracketing mode for the Nokia Pro Camera; Stereo audio recording; Customisable audio bass filter; New settings and processing algorithms for the Nokia Smart Camera; Nokia Best Shot in the Nokia Smart Camera captures a moving object multiple times; Motion Focus in the Nokia Smart Camera places focus on moving objects; Support for colourful profiles in the Display+Touch Settings menu; Flip to silence; FM radio support; Lumia Storage Check; Nokia Glance Screen; Nokia call+SMS filter Settings app; Up to 10% improved battery life (varies per device); Enables Nokia Video Trimmer and Nokia Video Upload
Lumia Black Bittersweet Shimmer	9 January 2014	Windows Phone 8 Update 3 (GDR3)	Default version for Nokia Lumia 525, 1320 and 1520 devices, developed by Nokia: An app folder app similar to those on the Android and iOS start screens; Bluetooth LE support; Updated Nokia Refocus, Nokia Beamer, and Nokia Storyteller apps; Nokia Camera application; 3 new shooting modes and video recording in camera settings; Light sensitivity settings for the Nokia Pro Camera; New oversampling algorithm; RAW and DNG format support for the Nokia Lumia 920, Nokia Lumia 925, and Nokia Lumia 1520; Pedometer for the Nokia Glance Screen; Enables Nokia Share and Nokia Video Director
Lumia Cyan Cherry Blossom Pink	15 July 2014	Windows Phone 8.1	Default version for Nokia Lumia 521, 530, 630, 635, 636, 638 and 930 devices, developed by Microsoft: Miracast support (for select devices); The ability to capture Dolby Surround Sound with Nokia Rich Recording; Updated Nokia Camera, Nokia Creative Studio and Nokia Storyteller apps; Nokia Device Hub (formerly a beta in the Nokia Beta Labs) bundled with settings.; Various improvements to Nokia's suite of imaging applications; Nokia SensorCore SDK; Equalizers for speakers; Ability to add an extra tile width to the home screen; Notification tray with 4 customizable quick settings; 5 new filters for the Nokia Creative Studio
Lumia Denim Debian Red	4 September 2014	Windows Phone 8.1 Update 1 (GDR1); Windows Phone 8.1 Update 2 (GDR2)	Default version for Nokia Lumia 730, 735 and 830 and Microsoft Lumia 430, 435, 532 and 535 devices with Windows¨Phone 8.1 Update 1; default version for Microsoft Lumia 540, 640 and 640 XL devices with Windows Phone 8.1 Update 2; developed by Microsoft: An improved Lumia Camera experience for high-end devices; Auto HDR and Dynamic Flash for the Lumia Camera; Improved image processing algorithms for the Lumia Camera; Increased speed in capturing images; "Hey Cortana" voice activation; MSN Weather and MSN Health & Fitness support for the Glance Screen; Enables Lumia Moments

== List of Lumia devices ==
All devices in the Lumia line were smartphones (including one tablet computer) running Microsoft Windows software. All the smartphones were full-touch in a candybar form. There were no QWERTY devices, although there were reports in 2012 that Nokia was working on such device similar to the Nokia Eseries. An alleged prototype device with full keyboard was leaked in 2017.

=== Numbering convention ===
The first digit (or the first two digits for devices with four-digit model numbers) indicates the device's family, with larger numbers generally denoting a higher-end device. Under Nokia, numbers larger than 10 indicated a phablet (e.g. 1320, 1520) or tablet (2520). Following the sale of the Lumia line to Microsoft, four-digit model numbers were discontinued, with larger models instead being denoted by an "XL" suffix (e.g. 950 XL).

The second digit indicates the generation of the device, based on the operating system it originally shipped with:

Digit	Operating system	Notes
0 or 1	Windows Phone 7	except the 810
2	Windows Phone 8	
3	Windows Phone 8.1	
4	Windows Phone 8.1 Update 2	
5	Windows 10 Mobile	

The third digit is used to distinguish between variants in the same family and generation. 0 indicates the base model, while other numbers indicate either a minor upgrade (e.g. 920 and 925), a 4G-capable variant (e.g. 730 and 735) or a regional or carrier-specific variant.

An optional "C" or "T" suffix indicates a variant produced exclusively for the Chinese market.

=== Nokia-branded Lumia devices ===
Nokia Lumia devices
Name	Codename	Release date	Series	Generation	Installed operating system	Variations
Nokia Lumia 800	Sea Ray	November 2011	800	1	Windows Phone 7.5	800C with CDMA2000 for China Telecom
Nokia Lumia 710	Sabre	January 2012	700	1	Windows Phone 7.5	
Nokia Lumia 900	Ace	April 2012	900	1	Windows Phone 7.5	
Nokia Lumia 610	Cliff	April 2012	600	1	Windows Phone 7.5	610C with CDMA2000 for China Telecom
Nokia Lumia 510	Glory	September 2012	500	1	Windows Phone 7.5	
Nokia Lumia 820	Arrow	November 2012	800	2	Windows Phone 8	810 for T-Mobile, 822 for Verizon
Nokia Lumia 920	Phi	November 2012	900	2	Windows Phone 8	920T for China Mobile
Nokia Lumia 505		December 2012	500	1	Windows Phone 7.8	
Nokia Lumia 620	Sand	January 2013	600	2	Windows Phone 8	
Nokia Lumia 520	Fame	January 2013	500	2	Windows Phone 8	520T with TD-SCDMA for China Mobile
Nokia Lumia 720	Zeal	January 2013	700	2	Windows Phone 8	720T with TD-SCDMA for China Mobile
Nokia Lumia 928	Laser	May 2013	900	2	Windows Phone 8	
Nokia Lumia 925	Catwalk	June 2013	900	2	Windows Phone 8	925T with TD-SCDMA for China Mobile
Nokia Lumia 1020	EOS	July 2013	1000	2	Windows Phone 8	
Nokia Lumia 625	Max	August 2013	600	2	Windows Phone 8	
Nokia Lumia 1320	Batman	October 2013	1300	2	Windows Phone 8	
Nokia Lumia 1520	Bandit	October 2013	1500	2	Windows Phone 8	
Nokia Lumia 2520	Sirius	October 2013	2500	2	Windows RT	
Nokia Lumia 525	Glee	December 2013	500	2	Windows Phone 8	526 with TD-SCDMA for China Mobile
Nokia Lumia Icon	Vanquish	February 12, 2014	900	3	Windows Phone 8	
Nokia Lumia 930	Martini	April 2014	900	3	Windows Phone 8.1	
Nokia Lumia 630	Moneypenny	April 2014	600	3	Windows Phone 8.1	635 with LTE, 636 and 638 with 1 GB RAM
Nokia Lumia 530	Rock	July 2014	500	3	Windows Phone 8.1	
Nokia Lumia 730	Superman	September 2014	700	3	Windows Phone 8.1	735 with LTE
Nokia Lumia 830	Tesla	September 2014	800	3	Windows Phone 8.1	

=== Microsoft-branded Lumia devices ===
Microsoft Lumia devices
Name	Codename	Release date	Series	Generation	Installed operating system	Variations
Microsoft Lumia 535	Chakra	November 2014	500	3	Windows Phone 8.1	Dual SIM
Microsoft Lumia 435	Vela	January 2015	400	3	Windows Phone 8.1	Dual SIM
Microsoft Lumia 532	Leo	January 2015	500	3	Windows Phone 8.1	Dual SIM
Microsoft Lumia 640	Dempsey	March 2015	600	4	Windows Phone 8.1	LTE, Dual SIM, LTE Dual SIM.
Microsoft Lumia 640 XL	Makepeace	March 2015	600	4	Windows Phone 8.1	LTE, Dual SIM, LTE Dual SIM.
Microsoft Lumia 430	Doris	March 2015	400	3	Windows Phone 8.1	Dual SIM
Microsoft Lumia 540	Lukla	April 2015	500	4	Windows Phone 8.1	Dual SIM
Microsoft Lumia 950	Talkman	November 2015	900	5	Windows 10 Mobile	Dual SIM
Microsoft Lumia 950 XL	Cityman	November 2015	900	5	Windows 10 Mobile	Dual SIM
Microsoft Lumia 550	Saimaa	December 2015	500	5	Windows 10 Mobile	
Microsoft Lumia 650	Saana	February 2016	600	5	Windows 10 Mobile	LTE, LTE Dual SIM

=== Cancelled Lumia devices ===
Cancelled Lumia devices refer to a series of Nokia (and Microsoft) designed smartphones that reached various stages of development but were never released to the consumer market. These devices were typically produced as engineering samples or prototype units intended for hardware validation, software testing, and operator certification. Many of them surfaced through leaks, auctions, and former employee collections after the discontinuation of the Lumia brand.

Name	Codename	Series	Generation	Installed operating system	Notes
Nokia Lumia 1030	McLaren	1000	3	Windows Phone 8.1	–
Nokia Lumia 1530	Goldfinger	1500	3	Windows Phone 8.1	–
Nokia Lumia 2020	Illusionist	2000	2	Windows RT 8.1	–
Nokia Lumia 435 (Not to be confused with Microsoft Lumia 435, check notes.)	Vela	400	3	Windows Phone 8.1	Sources at that time claim that the prototype was originally going to be released as Lumia 435. After the Vela was canceled, the name may have been reassigned to another device.
Nokia Lumia 719C	???	700	1	Windows Phone 7.5	Its codename never leaked, but concept designs and prototypes of the model do exist. The device was designed exclusively for the Chinese market.
Microsoft Lumia 740	???	700	4	Windows Phone 8.1	Its codename never leaked; only its specifications were leaked.
Microsoft Lumia 840	???	800	4	Windows Phone 8.1	Its codename never leaked; only its specifications were leaked.
Microsoft Lumia 940	Talkman (940) Cityman (940 XL)	900	4	Windows Phone 8.1	After the phones were cancelled, the codenames were subsequently used for the succeeding models, the 950 and 950 XL.
Microsoft Lumia 940 XL	Talkman (940) Cityman (940 XL)	900	4	Windows Phone 8.1	After the phones were cancelled, the codenames were subsequently used for the succeeding models, the 950 and 950 XL.
Microsoft Lumia 750	Guilin	700	5	Windows 10 Mobile	When the Lumia 750 prototype leaked, some sources claimed there were also prototypes of the 650 XL and 850, but there is no visual evidence to support this claim in this source. (These models were subsequently added, and their respective source citations are therefore referenced within their own sections.)
Microsoft Lumia 850	Honjo	800	5	Windows 10 Mobile	Some sources refer to it as Lumia 650 XL.
Microsoft Lumia 960	Northstar	900	6	Windows 10 Mobile	The last Lumia flagship model to be developed.

==== Cancelled Microsoft feature phone (Project Boca) ====
The RM‑1181, also known as Project Boca, was a Microsoft feature phone prototype developed around 2015 with a Metro UI-like skin, part of a small series that also included RM‑1182 and RM‑1183. These were basic, keypad-based devices branded by Microsoft, not part of the Lumia series and not running Windows Phone. They were built on the S30/S30+ platform and designed primarily for calls and texts rather than smartphone apps. The RM‑1181 prototype ran a modified version of Mocor OS, which influenced later devices such as the Nokia 3310 3G, released by HMD Global with a similar Smart Feature OS interface.

===== Variants =====
- RM-1182: Variant with different user interface.
- RM-1183: Another variant with Microsoft branding.

=== Lumia Hapanero ===
Lumia Hapanero (or RX-130) was an unreleased prototype Windows Phone device developed by Microsoft in 2015. It was used internally to test hardware and software features during the development of Windows 10 Mobile and was shown in leaked images and reports ahead of its planned appearance at Microsoft’s Build 2015 developer conference. The device featured high‑end hardware for its time, including a Qualcomm Snapdragon 810 processor, 4 GB of RAM, 32 GB of internal storage with microSD expansion, and a 20‑megapixel rear camera with triple LED flash. Two display variants were reportedly created, one with a 1080p screen and another with a 1440p screen. Lumia Hapanero was not commercially released and remained a prototype, with much of what is known based on leaked photographs and reports from Chinese social media and technology news sites.

==== Variants ====
Several engineering board revisions of the Lumia Hapanero were reportedly created for internal testing. These revisions included EB0.5, EB1.0, EB2.0, EB2.1, EB2.2, and EB2.3. Prototypes featured Windows 10 Mobile builds such as build 9867 and, in some cases, build 10113.

The device combined components from other Lumia models, including a Lumia 1520 touchscreen, a Lumia 830 battery, and a Lumia 950 XL processor. A fingerprint reader was also included. The battery performance was noted to be limited due to the combination of high-end components and testing configurations.

== Sales ==
Quarterly sales of Lumia devices (million units)
Quarters	Q4 2011	Q1 2012	Q2 2012	Q3 2012	Q4 2012	Q1 2013	Q2 2013	Q3 2013	Q4 2013	Q1 2014	Q2 2014	Q3 2014	Q4 2014	Q1 2015	Q2 2015	Q3 2015	Q4 2015	Q1 2016	Q2 2016	Q3 2016	Total
Quarterly global sales	1	2	4	2.9	4.4	5.6	7.4	8.8	8.2	8	7.4	9.3	10.5	8.6	8.4	5.8	4.5	2.3	1.2	1	111.3

Graph of quarterly global sales (million units)

== See also ==
- Lumia imaging apps
- Microsoft Surface
- Microsoft hardware
- Microsoft Kin
- Nokia X family
- Nokia Asha series
- HMD Skyline
