= Microsoft Lumia 950 =

Smartphone released in 2015

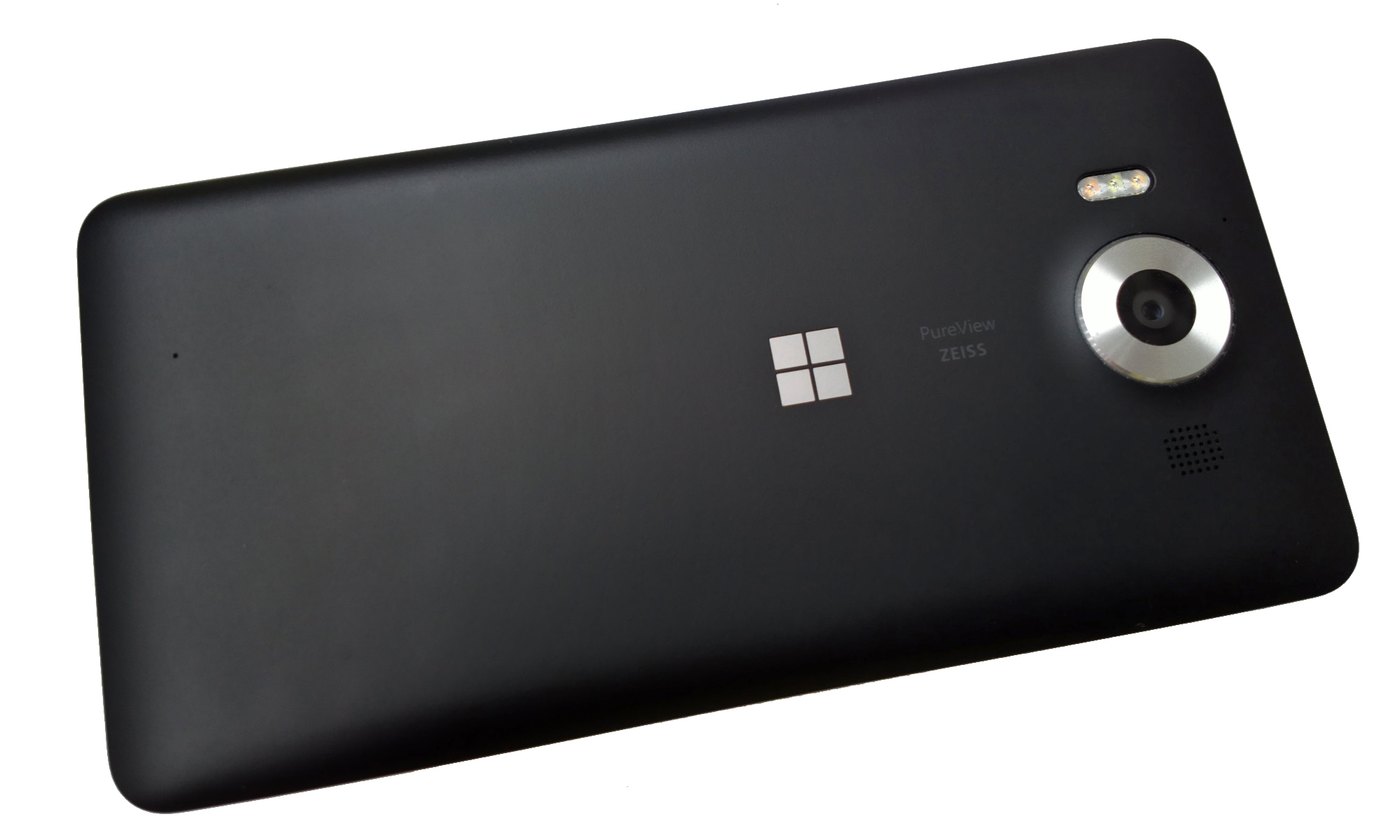
- Microsoft Lumia 950
- Brand: Microsoft
- Manufacturer: Microsoft Mobile
- Type: Smartphone
- Series: Lumia
- First released: 20 November 2015
- Predecessor: Lumia 930; Lumia Icon
- Related: Lumia 950 XL; Lumia 650; Lumia 550
- Compatible networks: GSM, HSPA, LTE
- Form factor: Slate
- Dimensions: 145 mm (5.7 in) H 73.2 mm (2.88 in) W 8.2 mm (0.32 in) D
- Weight: 150 g (5.29 oz)
- Operating system: Windows 10 Mobile
- System-on-chip: Qualcomm Snapdragon 808
- CPU: 1.82 GHz dual-core Cortex-A57 + 1.44 GHz quad-core Cortex-A53
- GPU: Adreno 418
- Memory: 3 GB LPDDR3
- Storage: 32 GB
- Removable storage: microSD up to 200 GB
- Battery: User replaceable 3000 mAh Li-Ion battery Qi wireless charging
- Rear camera: 20 MP PureView; 1/2.4 in PureView sensor Zeiss optics with f/1.9 aperture triple RGB LED flash optical image stabilization 4K video (2160p) at 30 fps
- Front camera: 5 MP f/2.4 aperture 1080p video
- Display: 5.2 in (130 mm) WQHD (1440x2560) AMOLED, 564 ppi, Gorilla Glass 3
- Connectivity: HSDPA (850, 900, 1700, 1900, 2100 MHz), GSM (850, 900, 1800, 1900 MHz), Wi-Fi (802.11 a/b/g/n/ac), Bluetooth 4.1, GPS, GLONASS, BeiDou; LTE (Bands 1, 2, 3, 4, 5, 7, 8, 12, 17, 20, 28, 38, 40: 2100, 1900, 1800, 1700/2100, 850, 2600, 900, 700, 700, 800, 700, 2600, 2300), USB-C
- Data inputs: Multi-touch capacitive touchscreen
- Other: Iris scanner (near infrared) for Windows Hello; Continuum for Phone via Microsoft Display Dock
- Website: Microsoft Lumia 950 at the Wayback Machine (archived 10 October 2015)

Microsoft Lumia 950 (codenamed Talkman, a reference to the old Nokia Talkman) is a smartphone developed by Microsoft Mobile, officially revealed on 6 October 2015 alongside the larger Lumia 950 XL. The phone was first released on AT&T in the United States on 17 November 2015, and subsequently made available on the Microsoft Store as well as in other countries.

The Lumia 950 was the successor to the 2014 Nokia Lumia 930 and is among the first phones to natively run Windows 10 Mobile. The phone is primarily aimed at users desiring a flagship device, in contrast to Microsoft's previous strategy of targeting developing markets with low-end hardware.

Microsoft's numbering convention designated the Lumia 950 as a 5th-generation device in the high-end 900 series.

The Lumia 950 was Microsoft Mobile's last Lumia flagship device, and its last flagship Windows Phone device. A supposed successor called Microsoft Lumia 960 (codenamed Northstar) was reportedly canceled while being in its prototype tests level, along with Lumia 850 and 750. The next Microsoft phone release was the Microsoft Surface Duo, while a Windows Phone-powered Surface Neo foldable tablet was cancelled too a few years later, after its introduction.

== Hardware ==
The Lumia 950 has a polycarbonate frame with a removable back shell, allowing access to the battery as well as SIM and microSD card slots. The phone is available in two colours, black and white, although third-party replacement shells were available in different colours and materials.

=== Internals ===
The Lumia 950 uses a Qualcomm Snapdragon 808 MSM8992 SoC which combines two 1.82 GHz Cortex-A57 and four 1.44 GHz Cortex-A53 cores in a big.LITTLE architecture, allowing more computationally intensive workloads to run on the faster "big" cores while threads with less priority run on the slower "LITTLE" cores. The SoC also includes an Adreno 418 GPU and is paired with 3 GB of LPDDR3 RAM. The phone has 32 GB of internal storage which can be expanded with microSD cards up to 200 GB in size.

=== Display ===
The Lumia 950 has a 5.2 in (130 mm) AMOLED display with a resolution of 2560x1440 (WQHD) and a 16:9 aspect ratio. Pixel density is 564 ppi. The display is protected by Gorilla Glass 3 and features ClearBlack technology for improved sunlight visibility, as well as double tap to wake, but unlike earlier Lumia flagships it does not support some features like Super Sensitive touch.

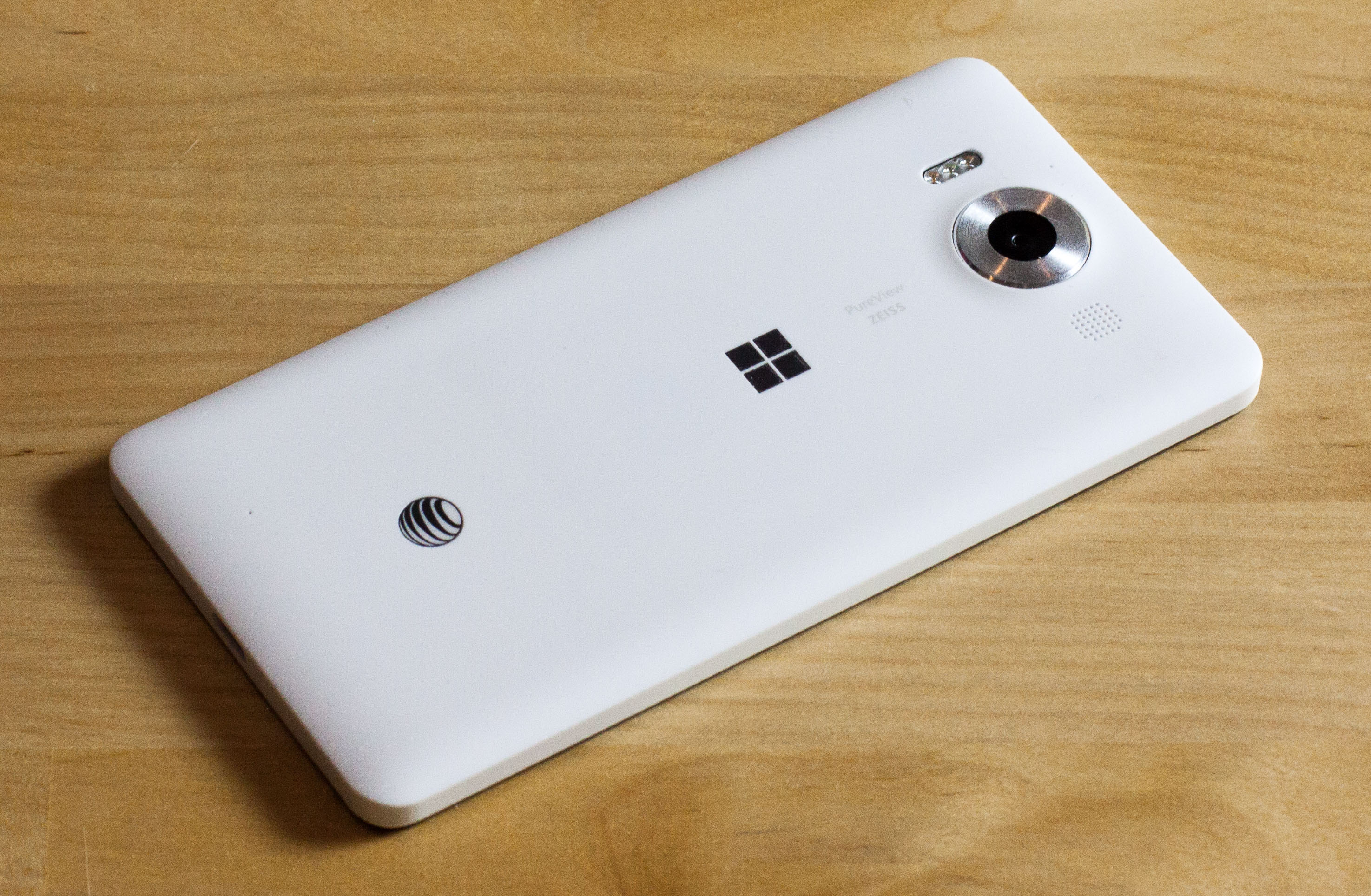
Back of the Lumia 950

=== Camera ===
The Lumia 950 has a 20 MP PureView-branded rear-facing camera, containing a 1/2.4 in BSI sensor with 1.12 μm pixels and phase-detection autofocus, a 6-element Carl Zeiss lens with a f/1.9 aperture and 5th-gen optical image stabilization, and a triple-LED RGB flash that can adjust to match the color of ambient light. Maximum image resolution is 4992x3744 pixels (18.7 MP) in 4:3 aspect ratio and 5344x3008 pixels (16.1 MP) in 16:9 aspect ratio. The camera can also capture oversampled 8 MP images, optionally with a full-resolution DNG file that enables more post-processing possibilities. The camera supports video capture at up to 4K (3840x2160) resolution, as well as slow-motion video at 120 fps, albeit at a reduced resolution of 720p.

The front-facing camera has a 5 MP sensor and a wide-angle f/2.4 lens, supporting video capture at up to 1080p resolution. The camera also supports Windows Hello through iris recognition with the help of an infrared LED.

=== Connectivity ===
The Lumia 950 supports 4G LTE technology with maximum transfer speeds of 300 Mbit/s (150 Mbit/s for the dual-SIM version). Other wireless connectivity options include dual-band Wi-Fi 802.11a/b/g/n/ac, Wi-Fi hotspot, NFC, Bluetooth 4.1, and wireless screen projection via Miracast. Physical connectors include a 3.5 mm audio jack, as well as a USB-C connector for charging and data transfer. The latter supports USB OTG, enabling the use of peripherals like mice, flash drives or external microphones, and USB-C fast charging.

=== Other ===
The Lumia 950 supports wireless inductive charging using the Qi standard. The AT&T version also supports the PMA standard.

With either the addition of a Microsoft Display Dock or by connecting to a Miracast receiver, the Lumia 950 is compatible with Windows Continuum, a technology that allows users to connect their devices to an external monitor for a desktop-like experience.

== Software ==
The Lumia 950 originally launched with Windows 10 Mobile Version 1511. Microsoft released Windows 10 Mobile Version 1607 (Anniversary Update) in August 2016, Version 1703 (Creators Update) in April 2017 and Version 1709 (Fall Creators Update) in October 2017. The phone received its last update in January 2020.

Third-party developers have managed to port Windows 10 ARM and Windows 11 ARM to the Lumia 950 and 950 XL, enabling the phone to run a full desktop version of Windows. Linux and Android have also been ported, but not all hardware features are working in these alternate operating systems.

== Known issues ==
The phone has issues with AT&T's LTE network when users do not first insert a SIM card before going through the phone's setup procedure, Cortana can cause echoes during voice calls, and the phone has been reported to have Wi-Fi issues.

Australian carrier Telstra has claimed the Lumia 950 has connectivity issues on their network.

Both the Lumia 950 and 950 XL were reported to experience reboots and crashes after their release. Most issues were subsequently fixed with Anniversary update in 2016.

== Reception ==
The Lumia 950 was generally well-received, with most reviewers commending the high-end specifications and camera performance, but finding the design to be less "premium" than competing flagships, and the app ecosystem to be less comprehensive than Android or iOS.

Daniel Rubino of Windows Central described the phone as packing "all the bells and whistles that Windows Phone fans have been clamoring for all in one device". The review particularly praised the camera, including image quality as well as features like Rich Capture and Living Images; overall verdict for the camera was "quite phenomenal". The phone's design was called "practical, but not beautiful", and features like Windows Hello and Continuum were reported to be working well, albeit with some issues. The Windows 10 Mobile operating system and its app selection were pointed out as the biggest weaknesses.

GSMArena rated the Lumia 950 very highly, saying that the phone "lives up to the hype and delivers on all advertised promises". The review highlighted the specifications, display and camera as being "top-notch" and found both Windows Hello and Continuum to be working "as advertised". While some faults were found with the design, battery life and price, the review concluded with: "Microsoft has done an amazing job with the Lumia 950... It's an eagerly anticipated phone and ... it deserves every bit of praise it gets."

PhoneArena gave the Lumia 950 a score of 7/10, describing it as "a phone ideal for the Windows fan", praising the display as well as features like Windows Hello, Continuum and Office integration. The main downsides were seen to be the design and app selection, while battery performance was determined to be average.

Edward C. Baig of USA Today commended the camera and replaceable battery, while describing the hardware specifications as "robust". However, new features like Windows Hello and Continuum were considered not to be "fully baked", and the design was described as less premium than competing flagships. The reviewer concluded by saying: "When it comes to phones however, [Microsoft] still has plenty of work to do."

Matthew Miller of ZDNet described the design as "an uninspiring, simple rectangular form factor", but acknowledged the practical advantages of plastic over materials like glass or aluminum. The Windows app ecosystem was seen as lacking in both quantity and quality compared to Android and iOS, and the reviewer expressed concern over the performance of the OS itself, although commending a number of features like "the Action Center, the awesome keyboard and predictive text engine, and reader mode in the browser".

Todd Haselton of TechnoBuffalo commended the inclusion of a dedicated camera key and overall imaging capabilities, but criticized the design and said the user interface of Windows 10 Mobile "feels unfinished". The reviewer gave the phone a "Don't Buy" rating, recommending readers to wait for an improved successor.
