= Microsoft Lumia 950 XL =

Windows 10 Mobile Smartphone developed by Microsoft

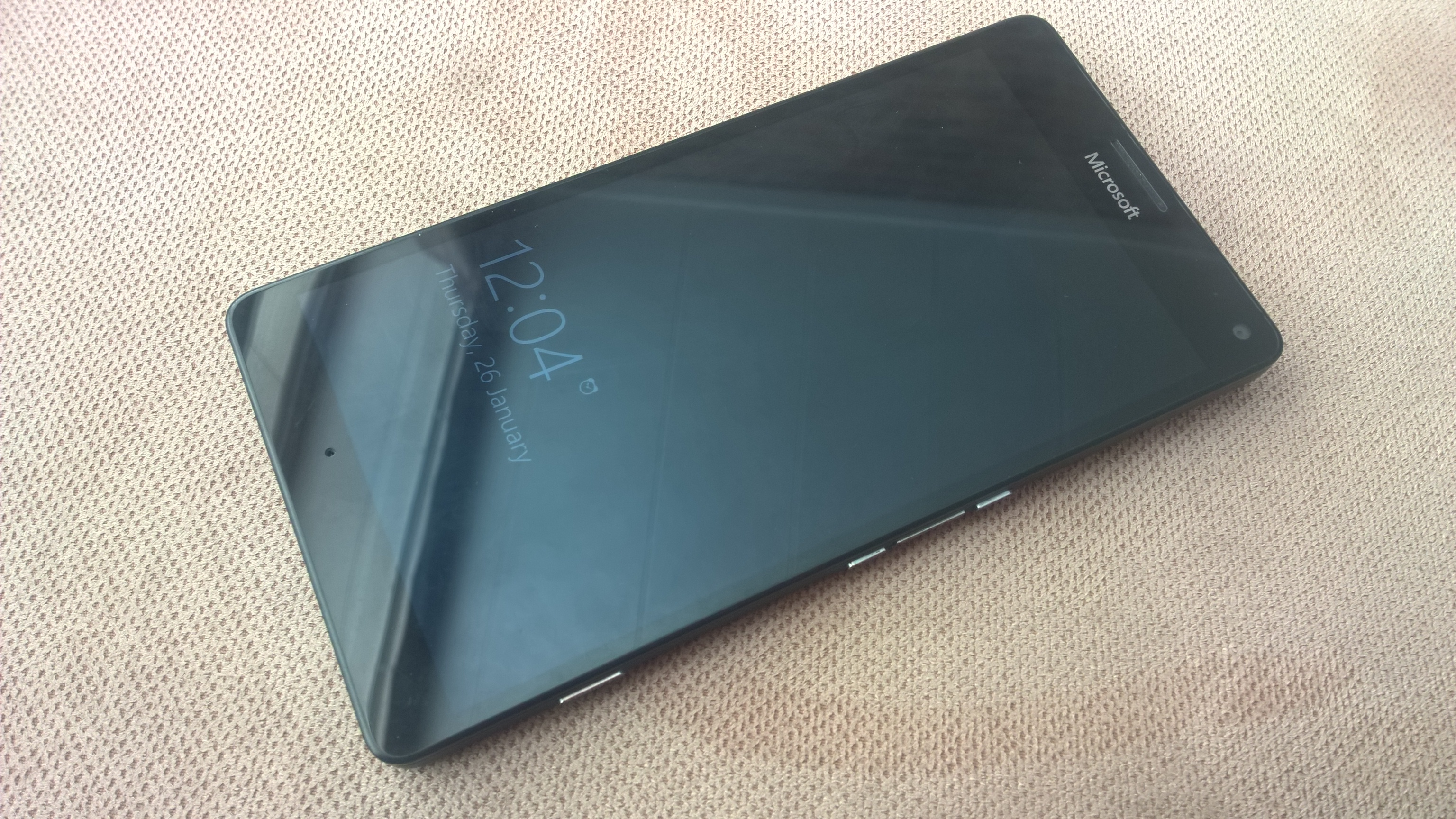
- Microsoft Lumia 950 XL
- Brand: Microsoft
- Manufacturer: Microsoft Mobile
- Type: Phablet
- Series: Lumia
- First released: November 20, 2015
- Predecessor: Nokia Lumia 1020; Nokia Lumia 1520
- Related: Microsoft Lumia 950
- Compatible networks: GSM, HSPA, LTE
- Form factor: Slate
- Dimensions: 151.9 mm (5.98 in) H 78.4 mm (3.09 in) W 8.1 mm (0.32 in) D
- Weight: 165 g (5.82 oz)
- Operating system: Windows 10 Mobile
- System-on-chip: Qualcomm Snapdragon 810
- CPU: 2 GHz quad-core Cortex-A57 + 1.5 GHz quad-core Cortex-A53
- GPU: Adreno 430
- Memory: 3 GB LPDDR4
- Storage: 32 GB
- Removable storage: microSD up to 256 GB
- Battery: User replaceable 3340 mAh Li-Ion battery Qi wireless charging
- Rear camera: 20 MP 1/2.4 in PureView sensor Zeiss optics with f/1.9 aperture triple RGB LED flash optical image stabilization 4K video (2160p) at 30 fps
- Front camera: 5 MP f/2.4 aperture 1080p video
- Display: 5.7 in (140 mm) WQHD (1440x2560) AMOLED, 518 ppi Gorilla Glass 4
- Connectivity: HSDPA (850, 900, 1700, 1900, 2100 MHz), GSM (850, 900, 1800, 1900 MHz), Wi-Fi (802.11 a/b/g/n/ac), Bluetooth 4.1, GPS, GLONASS; LTE (Bands 1, 2, 3, 4, 5, 7, 8, 12, 20, 28, 38, 40: 2100, 1900, 1800, 1700/2100, 850, 2600, 900, 700, 800, 700, 2600, 2300), USB-C
- Data inputs: Multi-touch capacitive touchscreen
- Other: Iris scanner (near infrared) for Windows Hello; Continuum for Phone via Microsoft Display Dock or Miracast
- Website: Microsoft Lumia 950 XL; Microsoft Lumia 950 XL Dual SIM

The Microsoft Lumia 950 XL (codenamed Cityman, a reference to the old Nokia Cityman) is a smartphone developed by Microsoft Mobile, officially revealed on October 6, 2015 and released on November 20, 2015 alongside the smaller Lumia 950. The Lumia 950 XL is the successor to the Nokia Lumia 1520 and is among the first phones to natively run Windows 10 Mobile. The phone is primarily aimed at users desiring a flagship device.

== Hardware ==
The Lumia 950 XL has a polycarbonate frame with a removable back shell, allowing access to the battery as well as SIM and microSD card slots. The phone is available in two colors, black and white, although third-party replacement shells are available in different colors and materials.

=== Internals ===
The Lumia 950 XL uses a Qualcomm Snapdragon 810 MSM8994 SoC which combines four 2 GHz Cortex-A57 and four 1.5 GHz Cortex-A53 cores in a big.LITTLE architecture, allowing more computationally intensive workloads to run on the faster "big" cores while threads with less priority run on the slower "LITTLE" cores. The SoC also includes an Adreno 430 GPU and is cooled by a heat pipe that dissipates heat inside the phone.

The phone has 3 GB of LPDDR4 RAM, and 32 GB of internal storage which can be expanded with microSD cards up to 256 GB in size.

=== Display ===
The Lumia 950 XL has a 5.7 in (140 mm) AMOLED display with a resolution of 2560x1440 (WQHD) and a 16:9 aspect ratio. Pixel density is 518 ppi. The display is protected by Gorilla Glass 4 and features ClearBlack technology for improved sunlight visibility, as well as double tap to wake, but unlike earlier Lumia flagships it does not support some features like Super Sensitive touch.

=== Camera ===
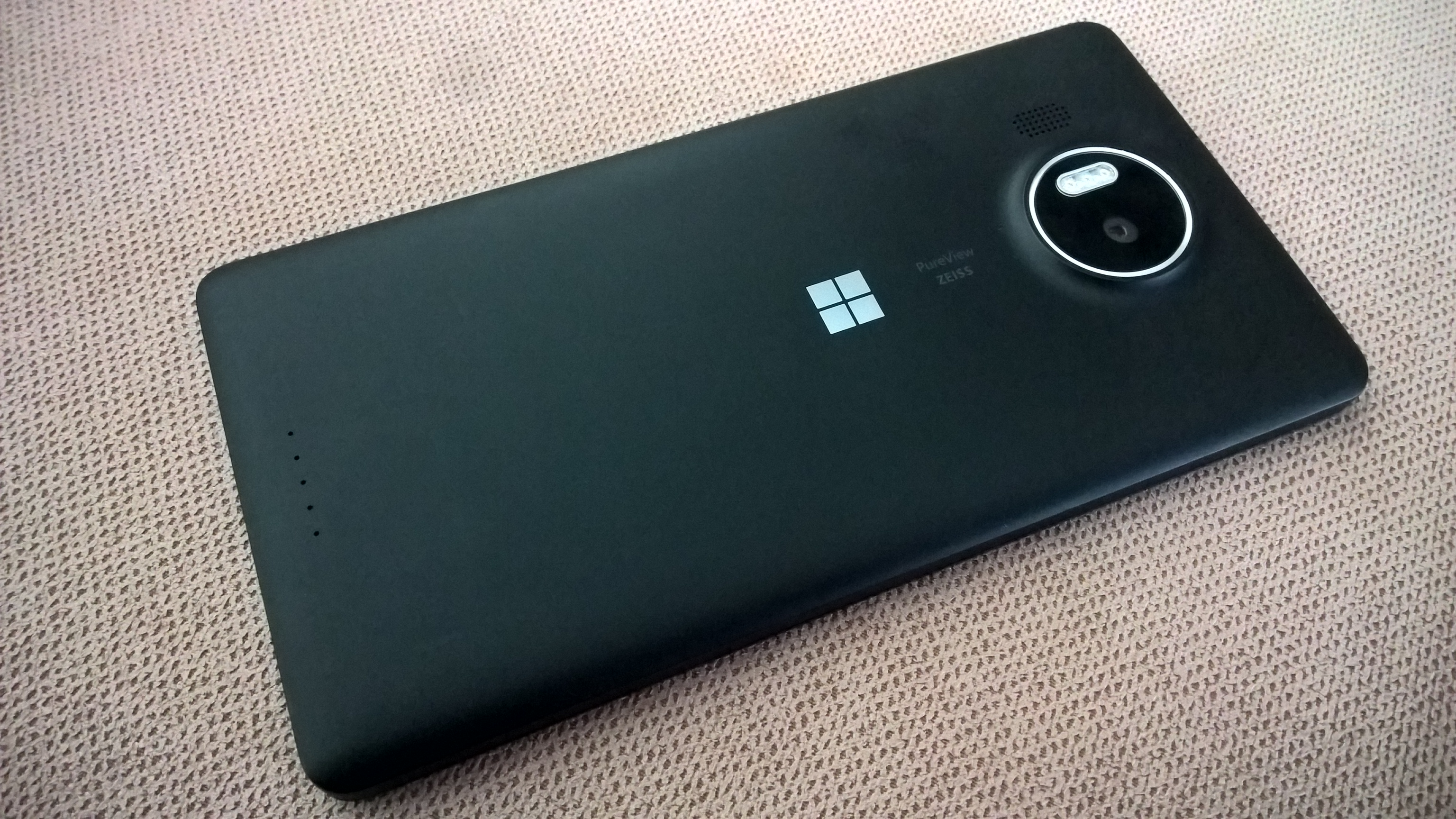
Back of the Lumia 950 XL

The Lumia 950 XL has a 20 MP PureView-branded rear-facing camera, containing a 1/2.4 in BSI sensor with 1.12 μm pixels and phase-detection autofocus, a 6-element Carl Zeiss lens with a f/1.9 aperture and 5th-gen optical image stabilization, and a triple-LED RGB flash that can adjust to match the color of ambient light. Maximum image resolution is 4992x3744 pixels (18.7 MP) in 4:3 aspect ratio and 5344x3008 pixels (16.1 MP) in 16:9 aspect ratio. The camera can also capture oversampled 8 MP images, optionally with a full-resolution DNG file that enables more post-processing possibilities. The camera supports video capture at up to 4K (3840x2160) resolution, as well as slow-motion video at 120 fps, albeit at a reduced resolution of 720p.

The front-facing camera has a 5 MP sensor and a wide-angle f/2.4 lens, supporting video capture at up to 1080p resolution. The camera also supports Windows Hello through iris recognition with the help of an infrared LED.

=== Connectivity ===
The Lumia 950 XL supports 4G LTE technology with maximum transfer speeds of 300 Mbit/s (150 Mbit/s for the dual-SIM version). Other wireless connectivity options include dual-band Wi-Fi 802.11a/b/g/n/ac, Wi-Fi hotspot, NFC, Bluetooth 4.1, and wireless screen projection via Miracast. Physical connectors include a 3.5 mm audio jack, as well as a USB-C connector for charging and data transfer. The latter supports USB OTG, enabling the use of peripherals like mice, flash drives or external microphones, and USB-C fast charging.

=== Other ===
The Lumia 950 XL supports wireless inductive charging using the Qi standard. The AT&T version also supports the PMA standard.

With either the addition of a Microsoft Display Dock or by connecting to a Miracast receiver, the Lumia 950 XL is compatible with Windows Continuum, a technology that allows users to connect their devices to an external monitor for a desktop-like experience.

== Software ==
The Lumia 950 XL originally launched with Windows 10 Mobile Version 1511. Microsoft released Windows 10 Mobile Version 1607 (Anniversary Update) in August 2016, Version 1703 (Creators Update) in April 2017 and Version 1709 (Fall Creators Update) in October 2017. The phone received software updates until January 14, 2020.

Third-party developers have managed to port Windows 10 ARM and Windows 11 to the Lumia 950 XL, enabling the phone to run a full desktop version of Windows. Linux and Android have also been ported, but not all hardware features are working in these alternate operating systems.

== Known issues ==
The phone has issues with AT&T's LTE network when users do not first insert a SIM card before going through the phone's setup procedure, Cortana can cause echoes during voice calls, and the phone has been reported to have Wi-Fi issues and to experience reboots. After firmware updates the known cause of reboots have been attributed to bad or worn batteries.

The back cover produces a creaky sound in the corners. It can be fixed by adding some sticky posts to the inside of the back cover.

== Reception ==
The Lumia 950 XL was generally well-received, with most reviewers commending the high-end specifications and camera performance, but finding the design to be less "premium" than competing flagships, and the app ecosystem to be less comprehensive than Android or iOS.

GSMArena gave the Lumia 950 XL a very favorable review, praising the specifications, display and camera, and commending Microsoft's unification of the UI and app stores of Windows 10 on mobile and desktop devices. The polycarbonate design was seen to be somewhat lacking given the price, with the reviewer saying that the phone "performs like a flagship champ, it's priced like a flagship champ, but it doesn't look the part".

Tom Warren of The Verge was highly critical of the design, calling it "uninspired, plasticky" and saying it "looks like a developer device". The aesthetics of the Windows 10 Mobile OS were also criticized, although the universal apps and Continuum were seen as promising. Camera performance was found to be good, with only a few flaws like autofocus speed and reliability of image processing.

Dragan Petric of Notebook Review criticized the ergonomics, saying the phone "doesn’t feel comfortable to hold" due to some sharp edges, and considered the design to be unfitting of a flagship device. The display was praised, with color accuracy as the only complaint, and the phone's camera was said to be "outstanding in any lighting condition". The review also highlighted the potential of Continuum and compared Windows Hello favorably with fingerprint readers.

Hannah Francis of The Sydney Morning Herald called the Lumia 950 XL "different, but not in a good way", commending Microsoft for features like Continuum but criticizing the implementation. Price and app selection were also seen as major downsides.

Expert Reviews gave the Lumia 950 XL a score of 3/5, with reviewer Katharine Byrne finding the performance disappointing despite high specifications. The Edge browser was highlighted as performing very well, and the reviewer also praised the display and camera, describing images taken with the phone as having "an astonishing level of detail".
