= Nokia Actionman =

Mobile phone model

- Manufacturer: Nokia
- First released: January 1984
- Availability by region: not available
- Form factor: car phone
- Display: monochrome LCD
- Data inputs: numeric keypad
- Development status: discontinued

The Nokia Actionman is a mobile phone from Nokia which has been discontinued. It was launched in January 1984 and used the NMT 450 network. It has a monochromic LCD. The phone is meant to be kept in cars. It only supports calling features. Multimedia and messaging are not supported by the Actionman. It has 100 channels which can be changed via the numeric keypad.
