= Nokia Lumia 925 =

Smartphone developed by Nokia

- Developer: Nokia
- Manufacturer: Nokia
- Type: Smartphone
- Series: Lumia
- First released: June 2013
- Discontinued: 2015
- Predecessor: Nokia Lumia 920
- Successor: Nokia Lumia 930
- Related: Nokia Lumia 928, Nokia Lumia 1020
- Compatible networks: GSM/GPRS/EDGE; HSPA+ LTE; Wi-Fi
- Form factor: Touchscreen
- Dimensions: 129 mm (5.1 in) H 70.6 mm (2.78 in) W 8.5 mm (0.33 in) D
- Weight: 139 g (4.9 oz)
- Operating system: Windows Phone 8, upgradeable to 8.1
- System-on-chip: Qualcomm Snapdragon S4
- CPU: 1.5 GHz dual-core Qualcomm Krait
- GPU: Qualcomm Adreno 225
- Memory: 1 GB RAM
- Storage: 16 or 32 GB internal flash
- Battery: BL-4YW 2000 mAh
- Rear camera: 8.7 megapixels 1080p Full HD video capture at 30 fps, autofocus Carl Zeiss optics plus sixth lens made of glass, Touch to focus, image stabilisation, Face detection, Exposure compensation, Digital zoom, Geo tagging, Power Dual-LED flash
- Front camera: 1.2 megapixels, 720p video capture at 30 fps
- Display: 4.5" AMOLED PenTile ClearBlack Touch at 334 ppi 1280x768 px, 15:9 aspect ratio
- Connectivity: List: Wi-Fi :802.11 a/b/g/n; Wi-Fi-based positioning system (WPS); GPS/GLONASS; SA-GPS NFC; Bluetooth 3.0; Micro-USB 2.0
- Data inputs: Multi-touch capacitive touchscreen, Gyroscope, Magnetometer, proximity sensor, 3D-Accelerometer
- Other: Talk time: Up to 18.3 hours Standby time: Up to 432 hours (18 days)
- Website: Nokia Lumia 925

Nokia Lumia 925 is a smartphone developed by Nokia that runs Microsoft's Windows Phone 8 operating system. It was announced on 14 May 2013, described as a "new interpretation" of the Nokia Lumia 920, and released in June 2013. A separate 925T version was announced for the TD-SCDMA networks in China.

The Nokia Lumia 930, successor to the Lumia 920 and 925, was announced at Build 2014 on 2 April 2014.

== Hardware ==
Compared to the Nokia Lumia 920, the Lumia 925 is both thinner and lighter, at 8.5 mm thick and weighing 139 g. The body is no longer fully made of polycarbonate, instead having a rounded aluminium frame. Display technology is changed from LCD to AMOLED, and wireless charging is supported only through an add-on sleeve. The base model has 16 GB of storage space, half that of the Lumia 920. A sixth, glass lens has been added to the camera, which protrudes slightly from the back.

== Software ==
The Lumia 925 ships with the Lumia Amber firmware update, which includes Windows Phone GDR2 as well as several new features like Glance Screen, double-tap-to-wake and Smart Camera.

== Availability ==
The phone is available in major European markets starting in June 2013, with an estimated price of 470 Euros. It is now available for sale in India through various online shopping sites. The phone is Nokia's flagship device at T-Mobile in the United States and became available for sale on July 17, 2013.

== Model variants ==
Model	RM-892	RM-893	RM-910	RM-955 (Lumia 925T)
Countries	International	United States	China	
Carriers/Providers	International	T-Mobile USA and AT&T Mobility	China Unicom	China Mobile
2G	Quad-band GSM/EDGE (850/900/1800/1900 MHz)			
3G	Quad-band HSPA+ 1, 2, 5/6, 8 (850/900/1900/2100 MHz)	Penta-band HSPA+ 1, 2, 4, 5/6, 8 (850/900/AWS/1900/2100 MHz) (AT&T version does not have AWS)		TD-SCDMA Bands 34/A, 39/F (2010-2025/1880-1920 MHz)
4G	Penta-band LTE 1, 3, 7, 8, 20 (2100/1800/2600/900/800 MHz)	Quad-band LTE 2, 4, 5, 17 (700/850/1700/1900 MHz)	Cat3	N/A
Max network speed	LTE: 100 Mbit/s		HSPA+: 21 Mbit/s	TD-SCDMA: 2.8 Mbit/s

== Reception ==
Reviews of the Lumia 925 were generally positive, with most critics noting significant improvements compared to its predecessor, the Lumia 920.

Andrew Hoyle of CNET commended the design, describing it as "luxurious" and "more mature-looking" compared to Nokia's previous, more colourful models. Praise was also given to the camera's low-light capabilities as well as the display. However, the removal of built-in wireless charging and the lack of any improvement in key specifications compared to the Lumia 920 were seen as the main downsides.

Tom Warren of The Verge called the Lumia 925 "[a] reliable workhorse", praising the overall design but criticising some decisions like the lack of colours or the placement of the loudspeaker. While the Windows Phone ecosystem was said to be "still lagging behind on the software front", the review commended the strong out-of-the-box software experience, in particular innovative new features like Glance and Smart Cam.

Mat Smith of Engadget considered the Lumia 925 to be an all-round improvement on the Lumia 920, but reported having mixed feelings about the colour scheme, describing the phone as "a lot safer, design-wise, and, well, a little blander than what we've seen before". The review also highlighted the Smart Camera app that debuted with the Lumia 925, as well as the energy-saving benefits of an AMOLED display.

Trusted Reviews awarded the Lumia 925 a score of 8/10, with reviewer Andrew Williams praising the phone's build quality and camera performance. The display was found to be "near-pin sharp" despite the PenTile layout, and the review also highlighted Nokia's solutions to typical AMOLED problems like ghosting and oversaturation. While the limited app ecosystem of Windows Phone was criticised as a major drawback, the review concluded by saying that the Lumia 925 "runs like a dream".

James Rogerson of TechRadar praised the camera and the premium design, but regretted that Nokia had used polycarbonate for the back instead of choosing a full-metal design. The main drawback was said to be the dated specifications compared to competing Android flagships.

Jonathan Bray of PC & Tech Authority, while calling the Lumia 925 "a capable, high-end smartphone that’s enjoyable to use", criticised the battery life and bemoaned the lack of improvements over the Lumia 920, resulting in an overall rating of 4/6.

== Technical issues ==
The T-Mobile US version of the Lumia 925 has been reported by some users to be unstable and resetting randomly. The Windows Phone 8.1 update was also reported to cause device freezes on some Lumia models, including the Lumia 925; Microsoft has acknowledged the issue and promised a fix.

== See also ==
- Microsoft Lumia
