= Nokia Lumia 830 =

Nokia Phone

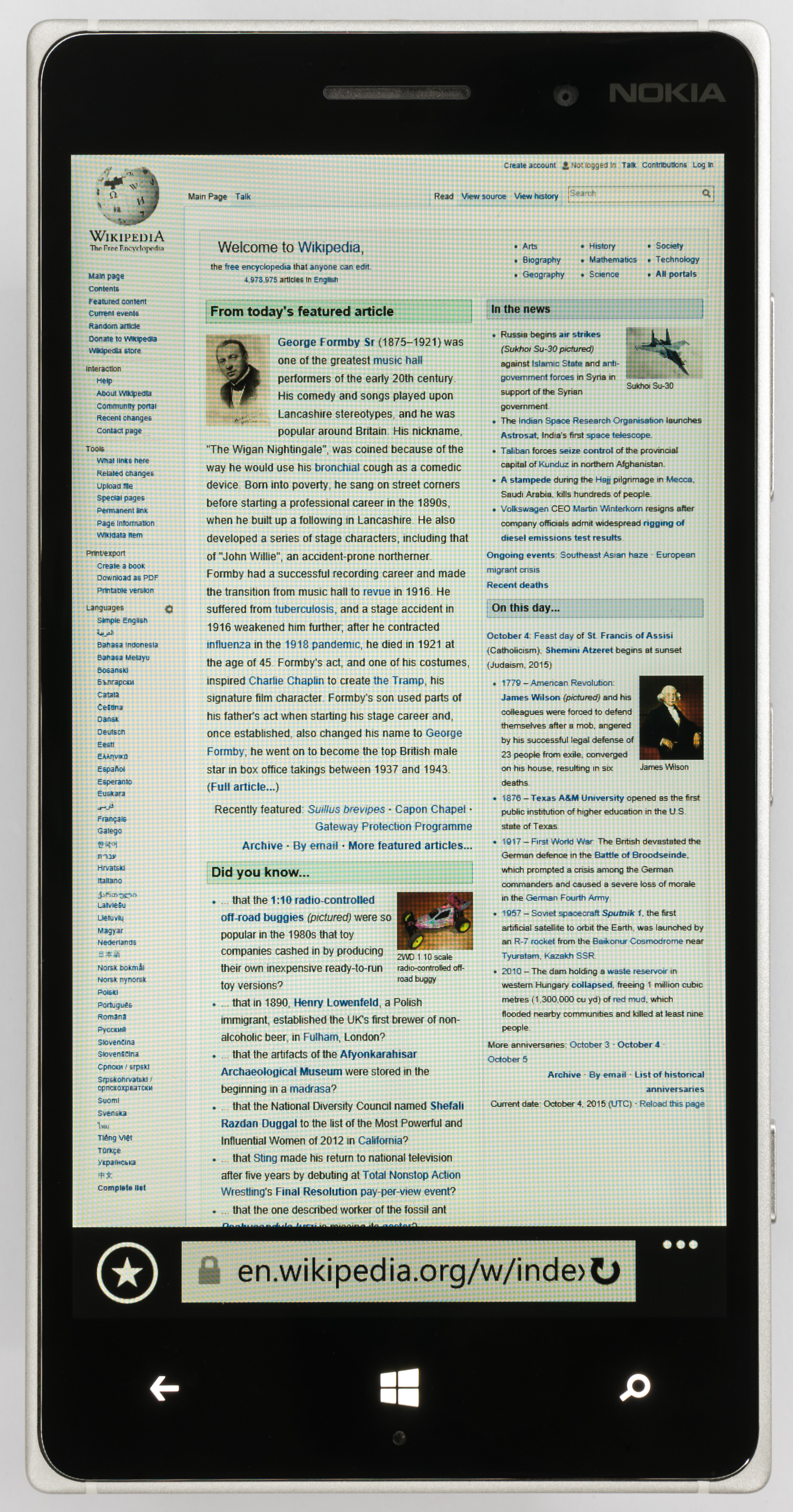
- Brand: Nokia
- Manufacturer: Microsoft Mobile (Nokia)
- Type: Smartphone
- Series: Lumia
- First released: October 9, 2014; 11 years ago
- Discontinued: April 25, 2015 (UK)
- Predecessor: Nokia Lumia 820; Nokia Lumia 822
- Compatible networks: GSM 850/900/1800/1900; HSPA 850/900/1900/2100; LTE 700/800/900/1800/2100/2600
- Form factor: Bar
- Dimensions: 139.4 mm (5.49 in) H 70.7 mm (2.78 in) W 8.5 mm (0.33 in) D
- Weight: 150 g (5.3 oz)
- Operating system: Windows Phone 8.1 Windows 10 Mobileversion 1607
- System-on-chip: Qualcomm Snapdragon 400 MSM8926
- CPU: 1.2 GHz quad-core ARM Cortex-A7
- GPU: Qualcomm Adreno 305
- Memory: 1 GB
- Storage: 16 GB
- Removable storage: microSD up to 128 GB
- Battery: Removable 2200 mAh Li-po battery Qi wireless charging (international version) / Power Matters Alliance (US version)
- Rear camera: 10 MP 1/3.4-inch PureView sensor Zeiss optics and optical image stabilisation f/2.2 aperture LED flash 1080p video at 30 fps with surround sound
- Front camera: 0.9 MP wide-angle f/2.4 aperture 720p video at 30 fps
- Display: 5.0 in (130 mm) IPS LCD touchscreen 1280x720 resolution (16:9 aspect ratio) at 296 ppi ClearBlack polarisation filter Curved (2.25D) Corning Gorilla Glass 3
- Sound: Dolby Digital Plus
- Connectivity: Wi-Fi 802.11a/b/g/n GPS with A-GPS, GLONASS and BeiDou; Bluetooth 4.0, NFC; MicroUSB 2.0, 3.5 mm audio connector
- Data inputs: Multi-touch capacitive touchscreen, gyroscope, magnetometer, proximity sensor, 3D-accelerometer
- Website: Nokia Lumia 830

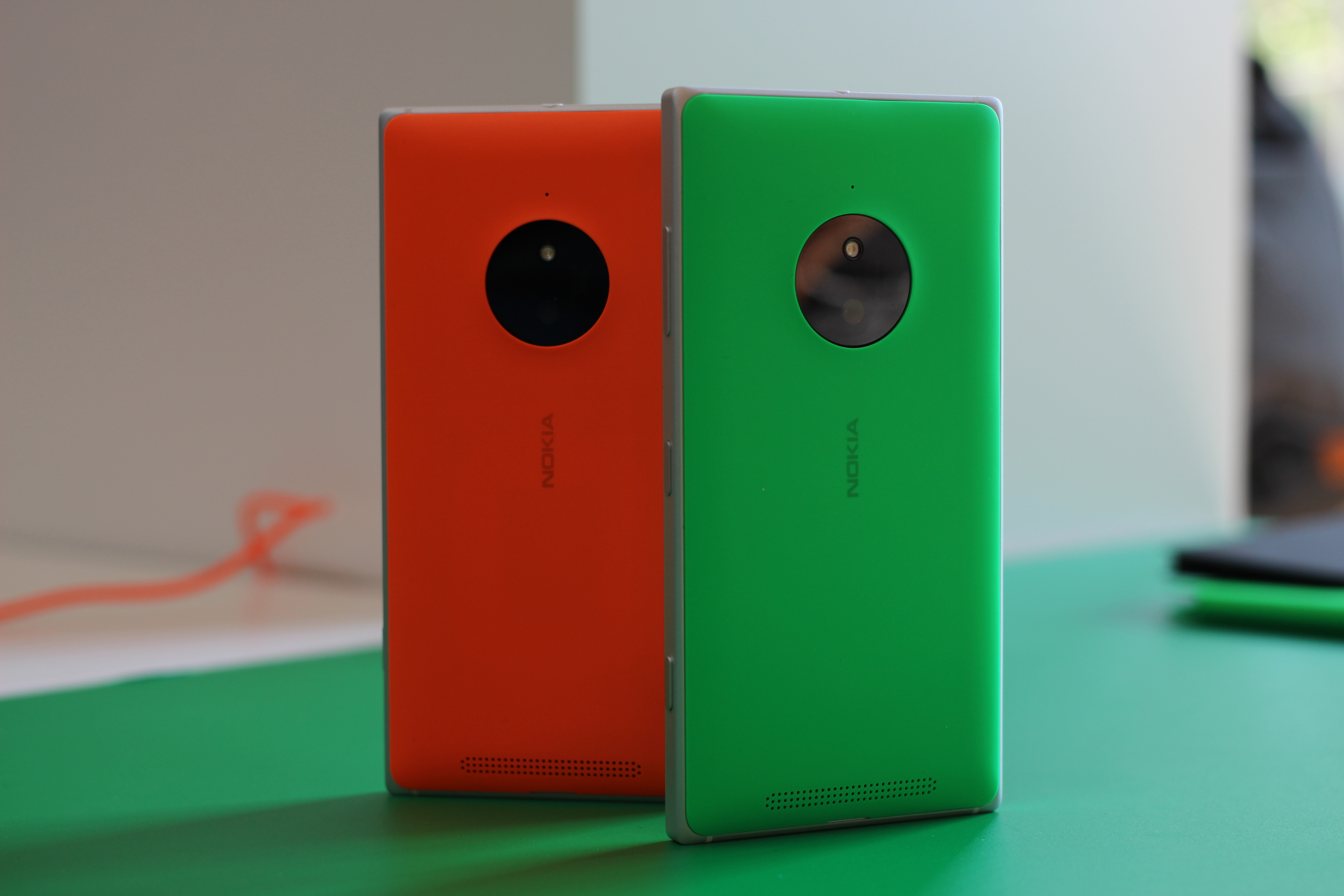
Two orange and green Nokia Lumia 830 units

The Nokia Lumia 830 is a smartphone developed by Nokia and released by Microsoft Mobile that runs Microsoft's Windows Phone 8.1 operating system. It was announced on September 4, 2014 at Internationale Funkausstellung Berlin, just a few months after Microsoft bought Nokia's mobile division and renamed it Microsoft Mobile. It was released in October 2014. It is a successor to the 2012 Nokia Lumia 820 and marketed as an "affordable flagship".

== Hardware ==
The Lumia 830 has a metal frame with a removable polycarbonate back. It is available in multiple colours - white, orange, green and black.

=== Internals ===
The Lumia 830 has a Qualcomm Snapdragon 400 MSM8926 SoC with a 1.2 GHz quad-core ARM Cortex-A7 CPU and a Qualcomm Adreno 305 GPU. There is 1 GB of RAM and 16 GB of internal storage; the latter can be expanded with MicroSD cards up to 128 GB in size.

=== Display ===
The Lumia 830 has a 5.0 in (130 mm) IPS LCD with a resolution of 1280x720 and an aspect ratio of 16:9. The display features Nokia's ClearBlack polarisation filters and is protected by curved Gorilla Glass 3.

=== Camera ===
The Lumia 830 has a 10 MP PureView-branded rear camera, sporting a 1/3.4-inch BSI sensor with 1.12 μm pixels, and an optically stabilised Carl Zeiss 6-element lens with an f/2.2 aperture. The camera supports 1080p video capture and is complemented by an LED flash and a two-stage shutter button. The front camera has a 0.9 MP sensor with a wide-angle f/2.4 lens, and supports 720p video recording.

=== Connectivity ===
The Lumia 830 supports 4G LTE technology with maximum transfer speeds of 150 Mbit/s. Other wireless connectivity options include dual-band Wi-Fi 802.11a/b/g/n, Wi-Fi hotspot, NFC, Bluetooth 4.0, and wireless screen projection via Miracast. Physical connectors include a Micro-USB 2.0 connector for charging and data transfer, as well as a 3.5 mm audio jack.

=== Other ===
The Lumia 830 supports wireless inductive charging using the Qi standard. The AT&T version additionally supports the PMA standard.

The Lumia 830 includes a variety of sensors, including proximity sensor, ambient light sensor, magnetometer, gyroscope and accelerometer, as well as Microsoft's Motion Data activity tracker based on Qualcomm's SensorCore technology. Due to chipset limitations, however, it does not support passive voice activation for the Cortana digital assistant.

The Lumia 830 supports video recording in Dolby Digital Plus and captures 5.1 surround sound from its dedicated microphones. The handset is also capable of decoding 5.1 Dolby Digital content and playing it back through virtual surround. For stereo content, the mobile can convert it into virtual 5.1 using the Dolby Digital Plus feature for audio playback through HRTF.

== Software ==
The Lumia 830 ships with Microsoft's Windows Phone 8.1 operating system coupled with the Lumia Denim firmware update.

The new Lumia Camera app in the Denim firmware update adds support for Rich Capture (HDR imaging), DNG capture and Moment Capture (high-quality 2 MP stills extraction from 1080p video).

The Lumia 830 can be upgraded to Windows 10 Mobile.

== Reception ==
The Lumia 830 has received mixed to positive reviews. Most critics commended the design, build quality and camera performance, as well as the availability of several high-end features at a mid-range price. On the other hand, many reviewers found fault with the chipset performance, display resolution and the overall Windows Phone app ecosystem (as compared to Android and iOS). Several reviews drew attention to the fact that the Lumia 830 would be the last Nokia-branded smartphone, with future models carrying the Microsoft Mobile brand instead.

Engadget gave the Lumia 830 a rating of 80/100, calling the rear camera "impressive" and praising the premium design and solid battery life, while criticising performance in graphics-intensive games and gaps in the app ecosystem, particularly for Google's services. Editor Philip Palermo concluded the review writing: "... in general, life was rather pleasant with the 830. It's an Icon(ic) phone that cuts most of the right corners."

Lee Bell of The Inquirer described the Lumia 830 as offering many of the same features as the higher-end Lumia 930 while being more compact, commended the availability of multiple colours and called the display "the most impressive we've seen on a Nokia Lumia device". A later review by Alastair Stevenson praised the impressive camera, as well as the enterprise and productivity features, while criticising the performance of Internet Explorer and the lack of "many apps that certain users will rely on for personal use".

Brett Howse of AnandTech called the Lumia 830 "one of the best Nokia phones launched [in 2014]", praising the design and ergonomics, but finding that the performance does not measure up to the "affordable flagship" moniker. The review concluded with: "The combination of the metal band, a thin chassis, a light weight, a decent display, and a decent camera make for a phone that is very good for the right price", but also noted that the phone costs more than it should in many regions.

Ivan Petkov of GSMArena.com highlighted the phone's design and build quality as positives, and found no major problems with performance, saying that the operating system runs "buttery smooth, without any lags whatsoever". New features added in Windows Phone 8.1 Update 1 and the Lumia Denim firmware update were also praised, while the main downside was seen to be the availability of mid-range Android phones that offer comparable or better specifications for the same or lower price.

Andy Vandervell of Trusted Reviews gave the Lumia 830 a score of 8/10, saying it compares favourably to the higher-end Lumia 930 in terms of design, and praising the camera's low-light capabilities. Poor performance in certain games was once again pointed out as a weakness, and the phone was said to be "useless as an in-car sat nav" due to the placement of the buttons and Micro-USB connector.

Nic Healey of CNET gave the phone a favourable review, listing the camera, design and overall value as positives and saying that "the Lumia 830 does its dynasty proud". The main criticisms were against the 720p display and the appeal, or lack thereof, of the Windows Phone ecosystem.

Business Insider UK ranked the Lumia 830 as 15th in their best smartphones list.

== See also ==
- Microsoft Lumia
