= Nokia Lumia Icon =

Smartphone developed by Nokia

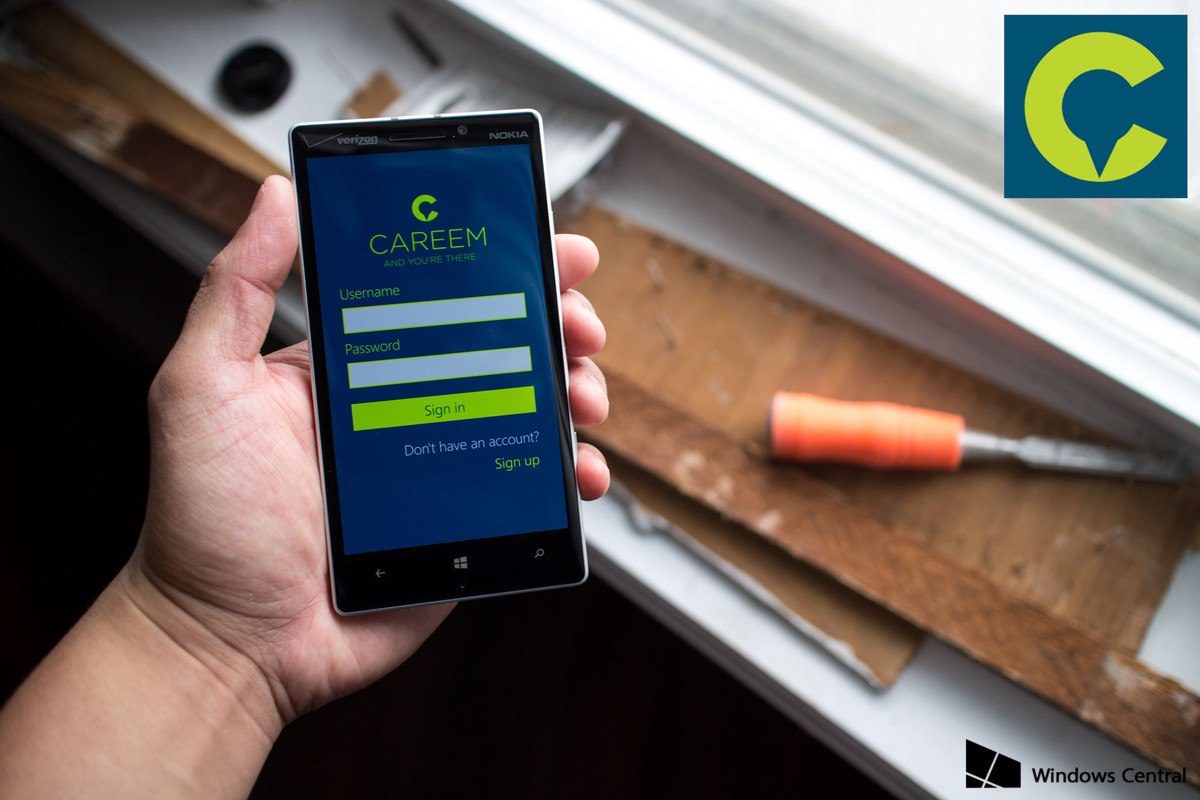
- Brand: Nokia
- Manufacturer: Nokia
- Type: Touchscreen smartphone
- Series: Lumia
- First released: February 20, 2014
- Predecessor: Nokia Lumia 928
- Successor: Microsoft Lumia 950
- Related: Nokia Lumia 930; Nokia Lumia 1520
- Compatible networks: 2.5G GSM/GPRS/EDGE – 850, 900, 1800, 1900 MHz 2.5G CDMA 1xRTT/1x-Advanced - 800, 1900 MHz; 3G UMTS/DC-HSPA+ – 850, 900, 1900, 2100 MHz; 3G CDMA Ev-DO Rev. A - 800, 1900 MHz 4G LTE Rel. 8 (UE Cat 3) – 700, 800, 900, 1800, 2100, 2600 MHz
- Form factor: Bar
- Dimensions: 137 mm (5.4 in) H 71 mm (2.8 in) W 9.8 mm (0.39 in) D
- Weight: 167 g (5.9 oz)
- Operating system: Windows Phone 8 upgradable to Windows 10 Mobile
- System-on-chip: Qualcomm Snapdragon 800 (MSM8974)
- CPU: 2.2 GHz quad-core Krait
- GPU: Qualcomm Adreno 330
- Memory: 2 GB LPDDR3
- Storage: 32 GB internal flash and 7 GB free in SkyDrive
- Battery: Integrated 2420 mAh Li-poly battery with Qi wireless charging
- Rear camera: 20 MP PureView sensor, Carl Zeiss Tessar lens and dual LED flash, wide-angle, f/2.4, 26 mm true 16:9 optics, 1/2.5-inch sensor, OIS, 2160p video capture @ 30 fps with LED for video
- Front camera: 1.2 MP wide angle, f/2.4, 720p video capture @ 30fps
- Display: 5 in (130 mm) FHD AMOLED, 1920 x 1080 pixels at 441 ppi, 16:9 aspect ratio, 24-bit color depth, 16M colors, 60 Hz refresh rate, ClearBlack display, Sunlight Readability Enhancement (SRE), High Brightness Mode (HBM), Super-sensitive capacitive touch enables interacting with the display with gloves and long fingernails, 2.5D Corning Gorilla Glass 3
- Connectivity: List: Wi-Fi :802.11 a/b/g/n/ac; Wi-Fi-based positioning system (WPS); GPS/GLONASS; SA-GPS NFC; Bluetooth 4.0; Micro-USB 2.0
- Data inputs: Multi-touch capacitive touchscreen, Gyroscope, Magnetometer, proximity sensor, 3D-Accelerometer
- Other: Talk time: Up to 16.4 hours Standby time: Up to 432 hours (approx. 18 days)
- Website: Nokia Lumia Icon

The Nokia Lumia Icon (originally known as the Lumia 929) is a high-end smartphone developed by Nokia that runs Microsoft's Windows Phone 8 operating system. It was announced on February 12, 2014, and released on Verizon Wireless in the United States on February 20, 2014. It is currently exclusive to Verizon and the U.S. market; its international counterpart is the Nokia Lumia 930.

On February 11, 2015, Verizon released the Windows Phone 8.1 operating system and Lumia Denim firmware update for the Icon. On June 23, 2016, Verizon released the Windows 10 Mobile operating system update for the Icon.

== Primary features ==
The primary features of the Lumia Icon are:

- 5in 1920x1080 AMOLED 441 PPI touchscreen display
- Qualcomm Snapdragon 800 Processor
- 2GB of LPDDR3 RAM
- 20 MP PureView camera with Carl Zeiss optics and pixel oversampling
- Optical image stabilization
- 2160p (4K UHD) video recording at 30fps
- Quad microphones with noise reduction
- Wireless AC Wi-Fi
- 4G LTE support
- Microsoft Cortana Voice Assistant with "Hey Cortana" voice activation (with Lumia Denim update)

== Availability ==
The phone was released for sale exclusively through Verizon in the United States for $199.99 with a 2-year contract or $549.99 with no contract. The Lumia Icon has almost identical internal specifications to the larger Nokia Lumia 1520 with the primary difference being that it has a smaller screen of 5 inches compared with the Lumia 1520's 6 inches.

The Nokia Lumia 930, released in April 2014, is nearly identical to the Icon in both appearance and specifications. However, the 930 uses GSM radios and comes with Windows Phone 8.1 and the Cyan firmware, and is the worldwide variant of the Icon. While the 930 has since been updated to Denim (which contains the Windows Phone 8.1 Update), Verizon previously faced criticism for not releasing the Cyan update for the Icon. Now that Verizon Wireless has updated the Icon directly to Denim, skipping Cyan, the OS and firmware distinctions have largely been eliminated.

== Naming ==
While in development, the Nokia Lumia Icon was known by its model number. Early development screenshots and prototype accessories referred to the phone as the Lumia 929. This was in keeping with Nokia's previous branding practice of assigning a corresponding number to the place where the phone would sit in Nokia's lineup, with higher numbers indicating higher-end models and lower numbers indicating lower-end products. Upon release, the phone kept the model number 929, but was the first Lumia to utilize a name other than its model number for branding.

== Reception ==
The Lumia Icon received fairly positive reviews, with some reviewers calling it the best Windows Phone released, praising the phone's camera quality, display, and overall speed but detracting its being locked to one carrier and having a camera with a slow transition time between taking photographs. Reviewers were split on the design of the phone, with some praising its metal build quality as solid and premium, and others criticizing it for being too utilitarian and conservative.

Brad Molen of Engadget called the Lumia Icon "the solid high-end Windows Phone that we've wanted for a long time. It has an amazing display, great performance and solid imaging capability, but its exclusivity to Verizon will severely limit its appeal." and Mark Hachman of PCWorld said "If you’re an app fiend, you’d still be better off buying an iPhone or Android phone, which dependably receive third-party apps. But the Icon and Lumia 1520 are clearly the best Windows Phones on the market. Deciding between them simply depends on which size you prefer." Christina Bonnington from Wired said that the best Windows Phone ever still disappoints, and mentioned poor call quality as one of the detractors, but praised the solid build quality, inclusion of wireless charging, and powerful processor.

== See also ==
- Microsoft Lumia
- Nokia Lumia 1520
- Nokia Lumia 930
