= Nokia Lumia 930 =

2014 Windows smartphone developed by Nokia

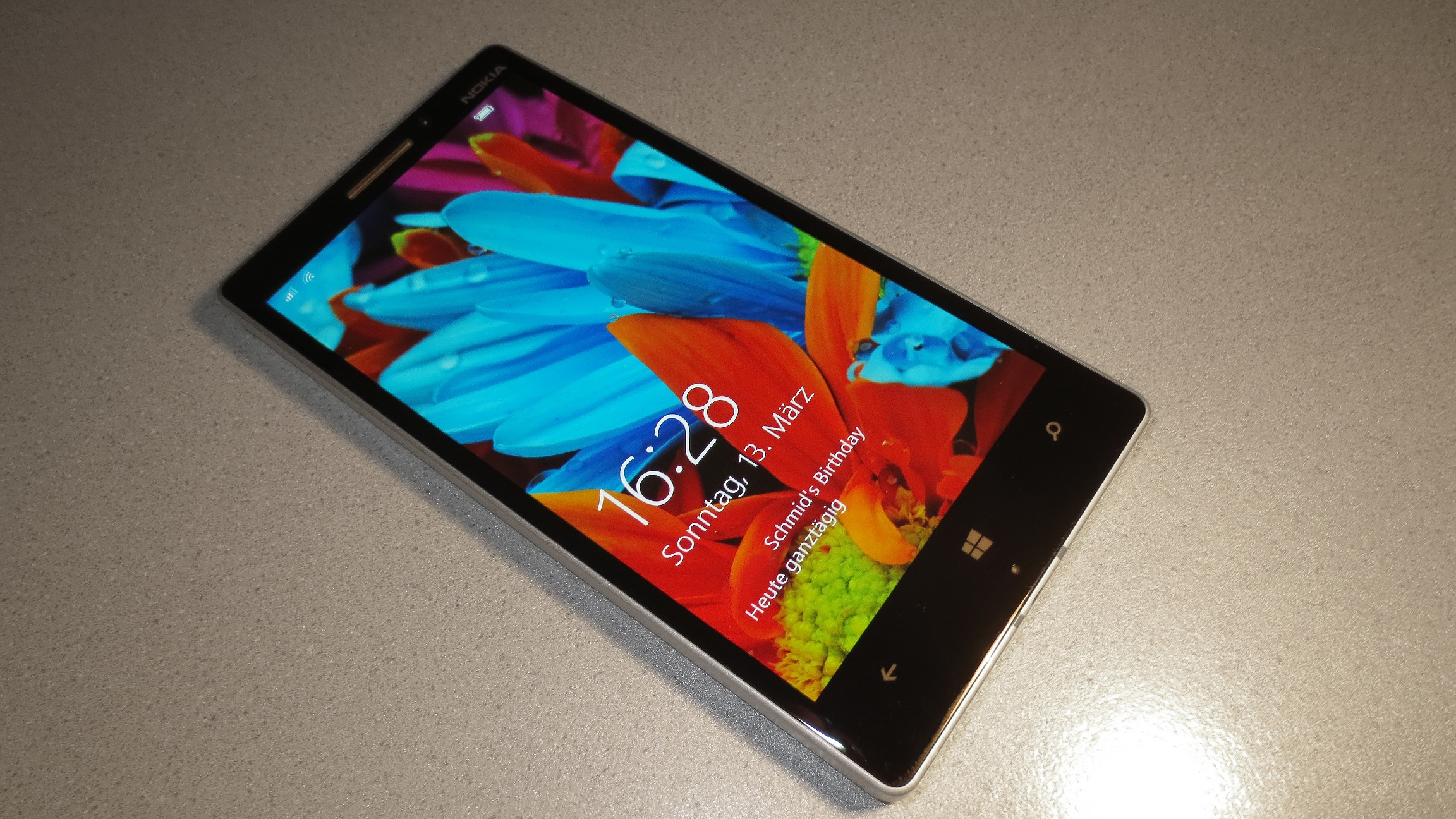
- Brand: Nokia
- Manufacturer: Microsoft Mobile
- Type: Smartphone
- Series: Lumia
- First released: July 4, 2014
- Discontinued: June 25, 2015 UK
- Predecessor: Nokia Lumia 920; Nokia Lumia 925
- Successor: Microsoft Lumia 950
- Related: Nokia Lumia 530; Nokia Lumia 630; Nokia Lumia 730; Nokia Lumia 830; Nokia Lumia 1520; Nokia Lumia Icon
- Compatible networks: GSM/GPRS/EDGE 850/900/1800/1900; HSPA+ 850/900/1800/1900; LTE 800/900/1800/2100/2600; Wi-Fi
- Form factor: Touchscreen
- Dimensions: 137 mm (H); 71 mm (W); 9.8 mm (D)
- Weight: 167 g (6 oz)
- Operating system: Windows Phone 8.1 Windows 10 Mobileversion 1607
- System-on-chip: Qualcomm Snapdragon 800
- CPU: 2.2 GHz quad core Qualcomm Snapdragon™ 800
- GPU: Qualcomm Adreno 330
- Memory: 2 GB
- Storage: 32 GB internal flash
- Battery: Integrated 2420 mAh Li-poly battery with Qi wireless charging
- Rear camera: 20 megapixels 1080p Full 4K video capture @ 30 fps with focal length of 26 mm
- Front camera: 720p (HD, 1280 x 720)
- Display: 5 in 1080p with Gorilla Glass 3; 441 ppi
- Connectivity: List: Wi-Fi :802.11 a/b/g/n/ac; Wi-Fi-based positioning system (WPS); GPS/GLONASS; SA-GPS NFC; Bluetooth 4.0; Micro-USB 2.0
- Data inputs: Multi-touch capacitive touchscreen, Gyroscope, Magnetometer, proximity sensor, 3D-Accelerometer
- Website: Nokia Lumia 930

The Nokia Lumia 930 (codenamed Martini) is a high-end smartphone developed by Nokia that shipped with Microsoft's Windows Phone 8.1 operating system. It was announced on April 2, 2014 at Microsoft Build 2014 and was released in April 2014 as Nokia's (and later Microsoft Mobile's) flagship. It is the last high-end Nokia-branded Lumia device and succeeded by the Microsoft-branded Lumia 950 and its XL equivalent.

The Nokia Lumia Icon, which is exclusive to Verizon Wireless in the United States, is essentially a derivative of the Lumia 930. The two versions share a common design and specifications; the only hardware difference is that the 930 is equipped with GSM radios and available as both carrier-locked and unlocked versions, while the Icon has both GSM and CDMA radios and is always sold unlocked. The other difference is that the 930 was originally pre-loaded with the newer Windows Phone 8.1 rather than the previous-generation Windows Phone 8 Update 3 on the Icon.

Neither the 930 nor the Icon have the Glance feature, which displays the time and other selectable information on the display of an otherwise sleeping phone. While other contemporary Nokia smartphones have Glance, the 930 and Icon do not because their displays lack the necessary "display memory" feature.

== Specifications ==
=== Hardware ===
The Lumia 930 has a 5.0-inch AMOLED display, quad-core 2.2 GHz Krait 400 Qualcomm Snapdragon 800 processor, 2 GB of RAM and 32 GB of internal storage. The phone has a 2420 mAh Li-ion battery, 20 MP rear camera and 1.2 MP front-facing camera. It is available in orange, green, white, black and gold.

=== Software ===
The Lumia 930 ships with Windows Phone 8.1, though users can upgrade to Windows 10 Mobile if their provider allows it.

== Known issues ==
Some handsets experience heat and battery drain issues.

Some handsets have had a display discoloration issue, when the device came out.

A significant number of Lumia 930 users have reported an issue with the operation of the audio microphones, where handsfree calls and video recordings have very low audio levels. This has been confirmed to be caused by a motherboard fault. There have been a number of reports of this being a software issue introduced with Windows 10, though this is incorrect as the issue is also reported with Windows 8.1, including pre-Denim releases. A workaround for Lumia 930 users experiencing this issue is to use ear buds that have a microphone included when doing handsfree calls and video recordings. Microsoft provides LumiaPhoneTestApplicationInstaller.exe, with which every microphone can be tested for its own.

== Gallery ==
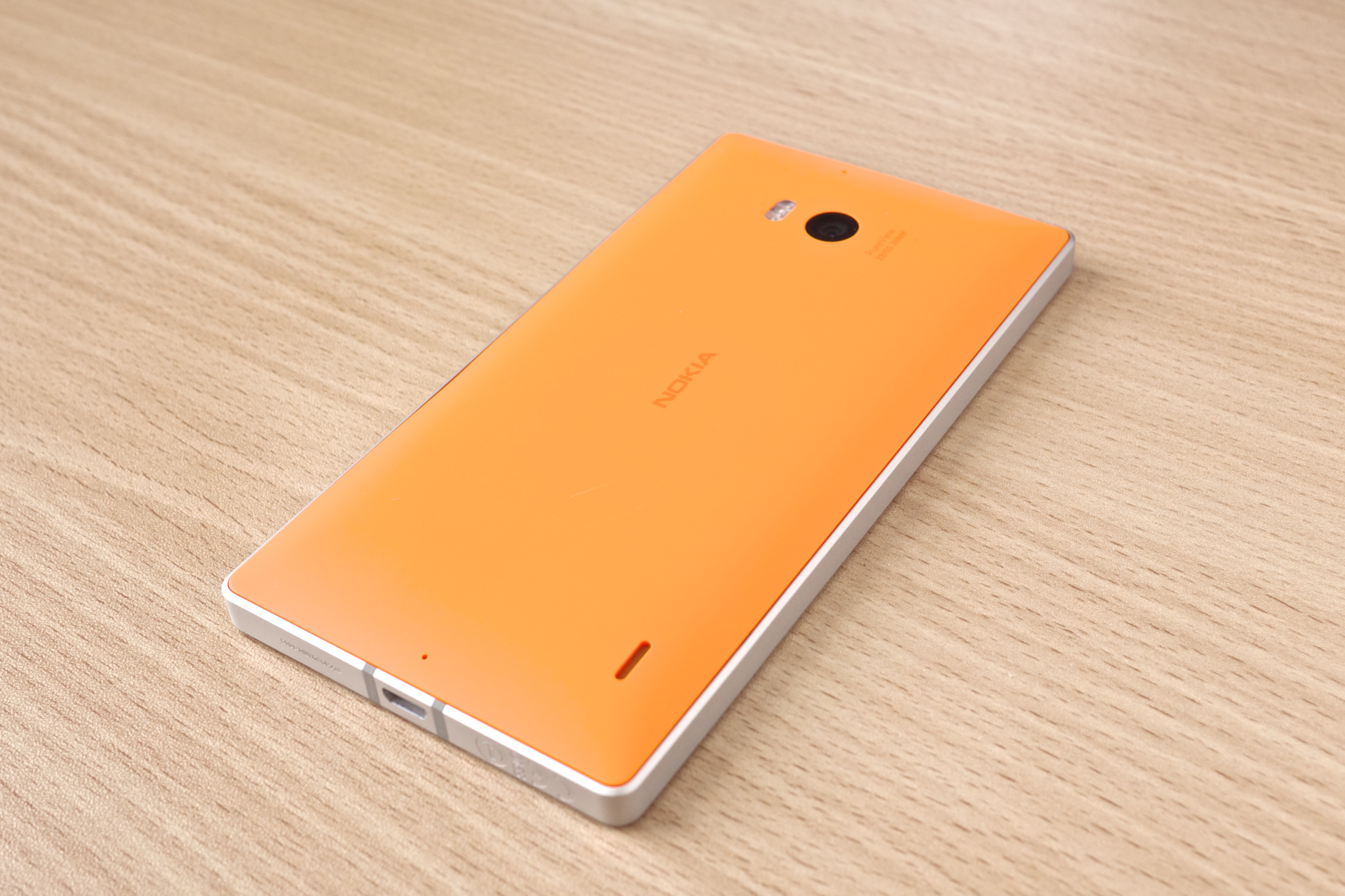
Back of an orange Nokia Lumia 930

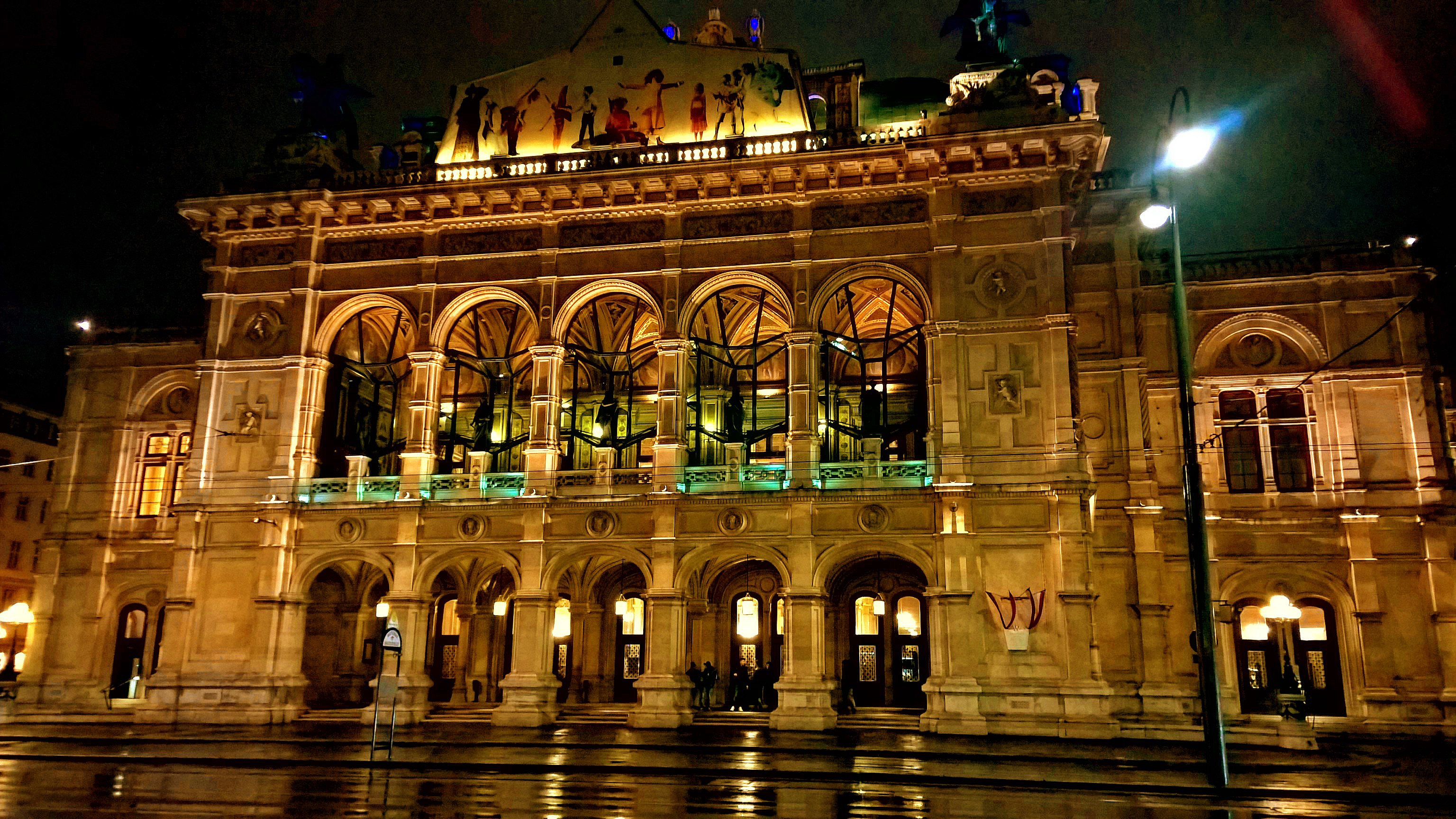
An image taken with the Lumia 930's camera at night

== See also ==
- Microsoft Lumia
- Nokia Lumia Icon
