= Comparison of Lumia smartphones =

The following tables are comparisons of the specifications of Microsoft Lumia smartphones from within the same generation. Lumia devices were developed and sold by Nokia until the acquisition of its mobile phone division by Microsoft in early 2014. The Nokia brand continued to be used on new models until the release of the Microsoft Lumia 535 in November 2014.

== First generation (Windows Phone 7) ==
First generation (Windows Phone 7)
Model	Lumia 510	Lumia 610	Lumia 710	Lumia 800	Lumia 900
Date introduced	September 2012	April 2012	January 2012	November 2011	April 2012
Initial operating system	Windows Phone 7.5				
Last supported operating system	Windows Phone 7.8				
Networks	GSM, HSDPA, Wi-Fi				adds LTE (US version only)
Dimensions	120.7 mm (4.75 in) H 64.9 mm (2.56 in) W 11.46 mm (0.451 in) D	119 mm (4.7 in) H 62.2 mm (2.45 in) W 11.95 mm (0.470 in) D	119 mm (4.7 in) H 62.4 mm (2.46 in) W 12.5 mm (0.49 in) D	116.5 mm (4.59 in) H 61.2 mm (2.41 in) W 12.1 mm (0.48 in) D	128 mm (5.0 in) H 69 mm (2.7 in) W 12 mm (0.47 in) D
Weight	129 g (4.6 oz)	131.5 g (4.64 oz)	126 g (4.4 oz)	142 g (5.0 oz)	160 g (5.6 oz)
Screen	Scratch resistant glass			Gorilla Glass (Curved)	Gorilla Glass (Flat)
Screen type	TFT LCD			AMOLED (PenTile pattern)	AMOLED (RGB stripe pattern)
Screen resolution	480 × 800 pixels				
Screen size (diagonal)	4 in (100 mm)	3.7 in (94 mm)			4.3 in (110 mm)
Battery life (3G talk time)	8.4 hours	9.5 hours	7.6 hours	9.5 hours	7 hours
Battery life (video playback)	7.4 hours	7 hours	6 hours	6.5 hours	8 hours
Battery life (music playback)	38 hours	35 hours	38 hours	55 hours	60 hours
Battery life (3G standby)	653.2 hours	720 hours	400 hours	335 hours	300 hours
Battery capacity	1300mAh			1450mAh	1830mAh
Camera resolution (still)	5 MP			8 MP	
Camera resolution (video)	480p @ 30 fps		720p @ 30 fps		
Camera aperture	2.4			2.2	
Camera lens	—			Carl Zeiss	
Front camera	—				1.3 MP
Camera flash	—	Single-LED		Dual-LED	
Storage	4 GB	8 GB		16 GB	
Storage expansion	None				
SoC	Snapdragon S1 MSM7227A (45 nm)		Snapdragon S2 MSM8255 (45 nm)		Snapdragon S2 APQ8055 (45 nm)
CPU	800 MHz Cortex-A5		1.4 GHz Scorpion		
RAM	256 MB		512 MB		
Applications	FM radio, Nokia Maps				

== Second generation (Windows Phone 8) ==
Second generation (Windows Phone 8)
Models		Lumia 520	Lumia 525	Lumia 620	Lumia 625	Lumia 720	Lumia 810	Lumia 820	Lumia 822	Lumia 920	Lumia 925	Lumia 928	Lumia 929 (Icon)	Lumia 1020	Lumia 1320	Lumia 1520	Lumia 2520
Date announced		February 2013	November 2013	December 2012	July 2013	February 2013	October 2012	September 2012	October 2012	September 2012	May 2013		February 2014	July 2013	October 2013		
Highest supported operating system version		Windows Phone 8.1 Update 1 (GDR1)					WP 8 + Amber	Windows Phone 8.1 Update 1 (GDR1)					Windows 10 Mobile (1607)	Windows Phone 8.1 Update 1 (GDR1)		Windows 10 Mobile (1607)	Windows RT 8.1
Upgradeable to Windows 10		No (due to 512MB only or Snapdragon S4)											Yes	No (due to Snapdragon S4)	Unknown	Yes	No
Physical specifications		Lumia 520	Lumia 525	Lumia 620	Lumia 625	Lumia 720	Lumia 810	Lumia 820	Lumia 822	Lumia 920	Lumia 925	Lumia 928	Lumia 929 (Icon)	Lumia 1020	Lumia 1320	Lumia 1520	Lumia 2520
Dimensions mm (in)	height	119.9 (4.72)		115.4 (4.54)	133.3 (5.25)	127.9 (5.04)	127.8 (5.03)	123.8 (4.87)	127.8 (5.03)	130.3 (5.13)	129 (5.1)	133 (5.2)	137 (5.4)	130.4 (5.13)	164.2 (6.46)	162.8 (6.41)	168 (6.6)
Dimensions mm (in)	width	64.0 (2.52)		61.1 (2.41)	72.3 (2.85)	67.5 (2.66)	68.4 (2.69)	68.5 (2.70)	68.4 (2.69)	70.8 (2.79)	70.6 (2.78)	68.9 (2.71)	71 (2.8)	71.4 (2.81)	85.9 (3.38)	85.4 (3.36)	267 (10.5)
Dimensions mm (in)	depth	9.9 (0.39)		11 (0.43)	9.2 (0.36)	9 (0.35)	10.9 (0.43)	9.9 (0.39)	11.2 (0.44)	10.7 (0.42)	8.5 (0.33)	10.1 (0.40)	9.8 (0.39)	10.5 (0.41)	10.5 (0.41)	8.7 (0.34)	8.9 (0.35)
Colours																	
Weight g (oz)		124 (4.4)		127 (4.5)	159 (5.6)	128 (4.5)	145 (5.1)	160 (5.6)	142 (5.0)	185 (6.5)	139 (4.9)	162 (5.7)	167 (5.9)	158 (5.6)	220 (7.8)	209 (7.4)	615 (21.7)
Memory		Lumia 520	Lumia 525	Lumia 620	Lumia 625	Lumia 720	Lumia 810	Lumia 820	Lumia 822	Lumia 920	Lumia 925	Lumia 928	Lumia 929 (Icon)	Lumia 1020	Lumia 1320	Lumia 1520	Lumia 2520
RAM	capacity	512 MB	1 GB	512 MB	512 MB	512 MB	1 GB						2 GB	2 GB	1 GB	2 GB	
RAM	Type	32-bit Single-channel, LPDDR2					32-bit Dual-channel, LPDDR2							32-bit Dual-channel, LPDDR2	32-bit Single-channel, LPDDR2	32-bit Dual-channel, LPDDR3	
Expandable		MicroSD, up to 64 GB								—					MicroSD, up to 64 GB		
Internal		8 GB							16 GB	32 GB	16 GB	32 GB			8 GB	32 GB	
Display		Lumia 520	Lumia 525	Lumia 620	Lumia 625	Lumia 720	Lumia 810	Lumia 820	Lumia 822	Lumia 920	Lumia 925	Lumia 928	Lumia 929 (Icon)	Lumia 1020	Lumia 1320	Lumia 1520	Lumia 2520
Diagonal size mm (in)		102 (4.0)		97 (3.8)	119 (4.7)	109 (4.3)				114 (4.5)	113 (4.4)		127 (5.0)	114 (4.5)	152 (6.0)		257 (10.1)
Enhancements																	
Glance																	
Gorilla glass		No	No	No	Yes	Yes	Yes	No	Yes	Yes	Yes	Yes	Yes	Yes	Yes	Yes	Yes
On-screen buttons																	
Pixel density ppi		235 ppi		246 ppi	201 ppi	217 ppi				332 ppi	334 ppi		441 ppi	334 ppi	245 ppi	368 ppi	218 ppi
Resolution pixels		480 × 800 (15:9)								768 × 1280 (15:9)			1920 × 1080 (16:9)	768 × 1280 (15:9)	720 × 1280 (16:9)	1080 × 1920 (16:9)	1920 × 1080 (16:9)
Super Sensitive Touch		Yes	Yes	Yes	Yes	Yes	Yes	Yes	Yes	Yes	Yes	Yes	Yes	Yes	Yes	Yes	
Technology		IPS 24-bit		IPS LCD ClearBlack 24-bit	IPS LCD 24-bit	IPS LCD ClearBlack 24-bit	AMOLED ClearBlack 24-bit			IPS LCD PureMotion HD+ 24-bit	AMOLED PureMotion HD+ 24-bit		AMOLED ClearBlack 24-bit	AMOLED PureMotion HD+ 24-bit	IPS LCD ClearBlack 24-bit		
Technology		Lumia 520	Lumia 525	Lumia 620	Lumia 625	Lumia 720	Lumia 810	Lumia 820	Lumia 822	Lumia 920	Lumia 925	Lumia 928	Lumia 929 (Icon)	Lumia 1020	Lumia 1320	Lumia 1520	Lumia 2520
Networks	GSM																
Networks	LTE																
Networks	UMTS																
CPU		1.0 GHz dual-core Krait			1.2 GHz dual-core Krait	1.0 GHz dual-core Krait	1.5 GHz dual-core Krait						2.2 GHz quad-core	1.5 GHz dual-core Krait	1.7 GHz dual-core Krait	2.2 GHz quad-core Krait	
CPU speed GHz																	2.2
GPU		Qualcomm Adreno 305					Qualcomm Adreno 225							Qualcomm Adreno 225	Qualcomm Adreno 305	Qualcomm Adreno 330	
SoC		Qualcomm Snapdragon S4 Plus; MSM8227 (28 nm)			Qualcomm Snapdragon 400; 8930 (28 nm)	Qualcomm Snapdragon S4 Plus; MSM8227 (28 nm)	Qualcomm Snapdragon S4 Plus; MSM8960 (28 nm)						Qualcomm Snapdragon 800	Qualcomm Snapdragon S4 Plus; MSM8960 (28 nm)	Qualcomm Snapdragon 400; 8930AB (28 nm)	Qualcomm Qualcomm Snapdragon 800 MSM8974 (28 nm)	
Battery		Lumia 520	Lumia 525	Lumia 620	Lumia 625	Lumia 720	Lumia 810	Lumia 820	Lumia 822	Lumia 920	Lumia 925	Lumia 928	Lumia 929 (Icon)	Lumia 1020	Lumia 1320	Lumia 1520	Lumia 2520
Max. claimed longevity hours	Video playback time																
Max. claimed longevity hours	Wi-Fi network browsing																
Capacity mAh		1430 mAh		1300 mAh	2000 mAh		1800 mAh	1650 mAh	1800 mAh	2000 mAh			2420 mAh	2000 mAh	3400 mAh | 8120 mAh		
Technology		Li-ion			Li-ion ?? / Li-Polymer		Li-Polymer	Li-Polymer	Li-Polymer	Li-Polymer	Li-ion	Li-Polymer	Li-Polymer	Li-ion	Li-Polymer		
Optics		Lumia 520	Lumia 525	Lumia 620	Lumia 625	Lumia 720	Lumia 810	Lumia 820	Lumia 822	Lumia 920	Lumia 925	Lumia 928	Lumia 929 (Icon)	Lumia 1020	Lumia 1320	Lumia 1520	Lumia 2520
Front camera	Aperture																
Front camera	Megapixels	—	—	0.3 MP		1.3 MP	1.2 MP	0.3 MP	1.2 MP			1.3 MP	1.2 MP		0.3 MP	1.2 MP	
Front camera	Video Resolution																
Main camera	Autofocus																
Main camera	Aperture	/2.4				/1.9	/2.2			/2.0			/2.4	/2.2	/2.4		
Main camera	Carl Zeiss Optics	No	No	No	No	Yes	Yes	Yes	Yes	Yes	Yes	Yes	Yes	Yes	No	Yes	
Main camera	Digital zoom with pixel binning																
Main camera	Flash	—	—	LED flash			Short-pulse high-power dual-LED				Dual-LED	Xenon flash	Dual-LED	Xenon and LED flash	LED	Dual-LED	
Main camera	Focal length mm (in)	28 mm				26 mm								25 mm for 16:9, 27 mm for 4:3	28 mm	26 mm	
Main camera	Megapixels	5.0 MP				6.7 MP	8.0 MP	8.7 MP	8.0 MP	8.7 MP PureView			20.0 MP PureView	41.3 MP PureView	5.0 MP	20.0 MP PureView	
Main camera	Optical image stabilization																
Main camera	Sensor size inches	1/4"				1/3.6"	1/3.2"				1/3"		1/2.5"	1/1.5"	1/4"	1/2.5"	
Main camera	Video frame rate fps	30 fps			30 fps	30 fps	30 fps										
Main camera	Video resolution	1280 × 720p @ 30 fps			1920 × 1080p @ 30 fps	1280 × 720p @ 30 fps	1920 × 1080p @ 30 fps										
Sensors		Lumia 520	Lumia 525	Lumia 620	Lumia 625	Lumia 720	Lumia 810	Lumia 820	Lumia 822	Lumia 920	Lumia 925	Lumia 928	Lumia 929 (Icon)	Lumia 1020	Lumia 1320	Lumia 1520	Lumia 2520
Accelerometer		Yes	Yes	Yes	Yes	Yes	Yes	Yes	Yes	Yes	Yes	Yes	Yes	Yes	Yes	Yes	
Ambient light sensor		Yes	Yes	Yes	Yes	Yes	Yes	Yes	Yes	Yes	Yes	Yes	Yes	Yes	Yes	Yes	
Gyroscope		No	No	No	No	No	Yes	Yes	Yes	Yes	Yes	Yes	Yes	Yes	Yes	Yes	
Magnetometer		No	No	Yes	No	Yes	Yes	Yes	Yes	Yes	Yes	Yes	Yes	Yes	Yes	Yes	
Microphones																	
Proximity sensor		Yes	Yes	Yes	Yes	Yes	Yes	Yes	Yes	Yes	Yes	Yes	Yes	Yes	Yes	Yes	
SensorCore		No	No	No	No	No	No	No	No	No	No	No	No	No	No	Yes	
Connectivity		Lumia 520	Lumia 525	Lumia 620	Lumia 625	Lumia 720	Lumia 810	Lumia 820	Lumia 822	Lumia 920	Lumia 925	Lumia 928	Lumia 929 (Icon)	Lumia 1020	Lumia 1320	Lumia 1520	Lumia 2520
SIM	Number of slots																
SIM	Size	Micro-SIM (3FF)											Nano-SIM (4FF)	Micro-SIM (3FF)		Nano-SIM (4FF)	
AV Connectors		3.5mm audio jack															
Bluetooth		Bluetooth 4.0, LE requires Lumia Amber (GDR2) update |					3.0	Bluetooth 4.0, LE requires Lumia Black (GDR3) update									
Charging/data transfer		Micro-USB 2.0															
NFC (Secure)		No	No	Yes	No	Yes	Yes	Yes	Yes	Yes	Yes	Yes	Yes	Yes	No	Yes	
Wi-Fi		b/g/n		a/b/g/n	b/g/n		a/b/g/n								b/g/n	a/b/g/n/ac	
Qi Wireless charging		No	No	No	No	with cover	with cover	with cover	with cover	Yes	with cover	Yes	Yes	with cover	No	Yes	
Models		Lumia 520	Lumia 525	Lumia 620	Lumia 625	Lumia 720	Lumia 810	Lumia 820	Lumia 822	Lumia 920	Lumia 925	Lumia 928	Lumia 929 (Icon)	Lumia 1020	Lumia 1320	Lumia 1520	Lumia 2520

== Third generation (Windows Phone 8.1) ==
Third generation (Windows Phone 8.1)
Models		Lumia 430	Lumia 435	Lumia 530	Lumia 532	Lumia 535	Lumia 630	Lumia 635/636/638	Lumia 730	Lumia 735	Lumia 830	Lumia 930
Date announced		March 2015	January 2015	July 2014	January 2015	November 2014	April 2014		September 2014			April 2014
Highest supported operating system version		Windows 10 Mobile (1607)		Windows Phone 8.1 Update 2	Windows 10 Mobile (1607)		Windows Phone 8.1 Update 2	Windows 10 Mobile (1607)[1GB] Windows Phone 8.1 Update 2 [512MB]	Windows 10 Mobile (1607)			
Upgradeable to Windows 10		Yes	Yes	No (due to 512MB only)	Yes	Yes	No (due to 512MB only)	Yes (1 GB RAM version)	Yes	Yes	Yes	Yes
Upgradeable to Windows 10		Yes	Yes	No (due to 512MB only)	Yes	Yes	No (due to 512MB only)	No (due to 512MB only)	Yes	Yes	Yes	Yes
Physical specifications		Lumia 430	Lumia 435	Lumia 530	Lumia 532	Lumia 535	Lumia 630	Lumia 635/636/638	Lumia 730	Lumia 735	Lumia 830	Lumia 930
Dimensions mm (in)	height	120.5 (4.74)	118.1 (4.65)	119.7 (4.71)	118.9 (4.68)	140.2 (5.52)	129.5 (5.10)		134.7 (5.30)		139.4 (5.49)	137 (5.4)
Dimensions mm (in)	width	63.2 (2.49)	64.7 (2.55)	62.3 (2.45)	65.5 (2.58)	72.4 (2.85)	66.7 (2.63)		68.5 (2.70)		70.7 (2.78)	71 (2.8)
Dimensions mm (in)	depth	10.6 (0.42)	11.7 (0.46)		11.6 (0.46)	8.8 (0.35)	9.2 (0.36)		8.7 (0.34)	8.9 (0.35)	8.5 (0.33)	9.8 (0.39)
Colours												
Weight g (oz)		127.9 (4.51)	134.1 (4.73)	129 (4.6)	136.3 (4.81)	146 (5.1)	134 (4.7)		130 (4.6)	134 (4.7)	150 (5.3)	167 (5.9)
Memory		Lumia 430	Lumia 435	Lumia 530	Lumia 532	Lumia 535	Lumia 630	Lumia 635/636/638	Lumia 730	Lumia 735	Lumia 830	Lumia 930
Expandable		microSD, up to 128 GB										No
Internal		8 GB		4 GB	8 GB		8 GB				16 GB	32 GB
RAM		1 GB		512 MB	1 GB		512 MB	512 MB or 1 GB	1 GB			2 GB
Display		Lumia 430	Lumia 435	Lumia 530	Lumia 532	Lumia 535	Lumia 630	Lumia 635/636/638	Lumia 730	Lumia 735	Lumia 830	Lumia 930
Diagonal size mm (in)		101 (4.0)		101.6 (4.00)	101 (4.0)	127 (5.0)	114.3 (4.50)		119.4 (4.70)		127 (5.0)	
Enhancements		—	—	—	—	—	ClearBlack polarizer					ClearBlack polarizer, 60 Hz
Glance		No	No	No	Yes	No	No	No	No	No	Yes	No
Gorilla glass		No	No	No	No	Yes	Yes	Yes	Yes	Yes	Yes	Yes
On-screen buttons		No	No	Yes	No	Yes	Yes	Yes	Yes	Yes	No	No
Pixel density ppi		235		245	233	220	221		316		294	441
Resolution pixels		800 × 480		480 × 854	800 × 480	960 × 540	480 × 854		720 × 1280			1080 × 1920
Super Sensitive Touch		No	No	No	No	No	No	No	Yes	Yes	Yes	Yes
Technology		LCD				IPS			OLED	AMOLED	IPS	AMOLED
Technology		Lumia 430	Lumia 435	Lumia 530	Lumia 532	Lumia 535	Lumia 630	Lumia 635/636/638	Lumia 730	Lumia 735	Lumia 830	Lumia 930
Networks	GSM	850/900/1800/1900										
Networks	LTE	—	—	—	—	—	—	800/1800/2600	—	800/900/1800/2600	800/900/1800/2100/2600	
Networks	UMTS	900/2100		850/900/1900/2100	850/900/1900/2100; 900/2100 (Dual SIM)	900/2100		850/900/1900/2100				
CPU architecture		Dual core, 28 nm		Quad-core, 28 nm								
CPU speed GHz		1.2										2.2
GPU		Adreno 302					Adreno 305					Adreno 330
SoC		Qualcomm Snapdragon 200; MSM8210		Qualcomm Snapdragon 200; MSM8212			Qualcomm Snapdragon 400; MSM8226	Qualcomm Snapdragon 400; MSM8926	Qualcomm Snapdragon 400; MSM8226	Qualcomm Snapdragon 400; MSM8926		Qualcomm Snapdragon 800; MSM8974
Battery		Lumia 430	Lumia 435	Lumia 530	Lumia 532	Lumia 535	Lumia 630	Lumia 635/636/638	Lumia 730	Lumia 735	Lumia 830	Lumia 930
Max. claimed longevity hours	Video playback time	6.5	6.6	5.5	7.4	6.5	7		9		10	9
Max. claimed longevity hours	Wi-Fi network browsing	9	9.4	8.5	12.5	8.5	9.4		9		10	9
Capacity mAh		1500	1560	1430	1560	1905	1830		2200			2420
Removable		Yes	Yes	Yes	Yes	Yes	Yes	Yes	Yes	Yes	Yes	No
Technology		Lithium-ion										
Camera		Lumia 430	Lumia 435	Lumia 530	Lumia 532	Lumia 535	Lumia 630	Lumia 635/636/638	Lumia 730	Lumia 735	Lumia 830	Lumia 930
Front camera	Aperture	f/2.8	f/2.7	—	f/2.7	f/2.5	—	—	f/2.4			
Front camera	Megapixels	0.3		—	0.3	5	—	5	5		0.9	1.2
Front camera	Video Resolution	VGA (640 × 480)		—	VGA (640 × 480)	FWVGA (848 × 480)	—	—	FHD (1920 × 1080)		HD (1280 × 720)	
Main camera	Autofocus	No	No	No	No	Yes	Yes	Yes	Yes	Yes	Yes	Yes
Main camera	Aperture	f/2.2	f/2.7	f/2.4	f/2.5		f/2.4		f/1.9		f/2.2	f/2.4
Main camera	Carl Zeiss Optics	No	No	No	No	No	No	No	Yes	Yes	Yes	Yes
Main camera	Digital zoom with pixel binning	No	No	No	No	No	No	No	No	No	No	Yes
Main camera	Flash	No	No	No	No	LED	No	No	LED	LED	LED	Dual LED
Main camera	Focal length mm (in)		36 (1.4)	28 (1.1)					26 (1.0)			
Main camera	Megapixels	2		5					6.7		10	20
Main camera	Optical image stabilization	No	No	No	No	No	No	No	No	No	Yes	Yes
Main camera	Sensor size inches	1/5		1/4					1/3.4			1/2.5
Main camera	Video frame rate fps	30										
Main camera	Video resolution	FWVGA (848 × 480)		WVGA (800 × 448)	FWVGA (848 × 480)		HD (1280 × 720)		FHD (1920 × 1080)			4K (4096 × 2160)
Lossless image format (DNG)		No	No	No	No	No	No	No	No	No	Yes	Yes
Sensors		Lumia 430	Lumia 435	Lumia 530	Lumia 532	Lumia 535	Lumia 630	Lumia 635/636/638	Lumia 730	Lumia 735	Lumia 830	Lumia 930
Accelerometer		Yes	Yes	Yes	Yes	Yes	Yes	Yes	Yes	Yes	Yes	Yes
Ambient light sensor		Yes	Yes	No	Yes	Yes	No	No	Yes	Yes	Yes	Yes
Gyroscope		No	No	No	No	No	No	No	No	No	Yes	Yes
Magnetometer		No	No	No	No	No	No	No	Yes	Yes	Yes	Yes
Microphones		1	2								3	4
Proximity sensor		Yes	Yes	No	Yes	Yes	No	No	Yes	Yes	Yes	Yes
SensorCore		No	No	No	No	No	Yes	Yes	Yes	Yes	Yes	Yes
Connectivity		Lumia 430	Lumia 435	Lumia 530	Lumia 532	Lumia 535	Lumia 630	Lumia 635/636/638	Lumia 730	Lumia 735	Lumia 830	Lumia 930
SIM	Number of slots	Dual	Single/dual variants					Single	Dual	Single		
SIM	Size	Micro-SIM								Nano-SIM		
AV Connectors		3.5mm audio jack										
Bluetooth		4.0										
Charging/data transfer		Micro-USB 2.0										
NFC (secure)		No	No	No	No	No	No	No	Yes	Yes	Yes	Yes
Wi-Fi		b/g/n									a/b/g/n	a/b/g/n/ac
Qi Wireless charging		No	No	No	No	No	No	No	No	with cover	Yes	Yes
Miscellaneous		Lumia 430	Lumia 435	Lumia 530	Lumia 532	Lumia 535	Lumia 630	Lumia 635/636/638	Lumia 730	Lumia 735	Lumia 830	Lumia 930
FM radio		Yes	Yes	Yes	Yes	Yes	Yes	Yes	Yes	Yes	Yes	Yes
Digital TV		No	some variants	No	some variants	No	some variants	No	No	No	No	No
Models		Lumia 430	Lumia 435	Lumia 530	Lumia 532	Lumia 535	Lumia 630	Lumia 635/636/638	Lumia 730	Lumia 735	Lumia 830	Lumia 930

== Fourth generation (Windows Phone 8.1 Update 2) ==
Fourth generation (Windows Phone 8.1 Update 2)
Models		Lumia 540	Lumia 640	Lumia 640 XL
Date announced		April 2015	March 2015	
Highest supported operating system version		Windows 10 Mobile (1607)	Windows 10 Mobile (1703)	
Upgradeable to Windows 10		Yes	Yes	Yes
Physical specifications		Lumia 540	Lumia 640	Lumia 640 XL
Dimensions mm (in)	height	144 (5.7)	141.3 (5.56)	157.9 (6.22)
Dimensions mm (in)	width	73.9 (2.91)	72.2 (2.84)	81.5 (3.21)
Dimensions mm (in)	depth	8.6 (0.34)	8.8 (0.35)	9 (0.35)
Colours				
Weight g (oz)		152 (5.4)	144 (5.1)	171 (6.0)
Memory		Lumia 540	Lumia 640	Lumia 640 XL
Expandable		microSD, up to 128 GB		
Internal		8 GB		
RAM		1 GB		
Display		Lumia 540	Lumia 640	Lumia 640 XL
Diagonal size mm (in)		127 (5.0)	127 (5.0)	145 (5.7)
Enhancements		ClearBlack polarizer		
Glance		No	Yes	Yes
Gorilla glass		Yes	Yes	Yes
On-screen buttons		Yes	Yes	Yes
Pixel density ppi		294		259
Resolution pixels		1280 × 720		
Super Sensitive Touch		No	No	No
Technology		IPS		
Technology		Lumia 540	Lumia 640	Lumia 640 XL
Networks	GSM	850/900/1800/1900		
Networks	LTE		Differs by variant	
Networks	UMTS	Band 1 (2100 MHz), Band 8 (900 MHz)	Differs by variant	
CPU architecture		Quad core, 28 nm		
CPU speed GHz		1.2		
GPU		Adreno 302	Adreno 305	
Soc		Qualcomm Snapdragon 200	Qualcomm Snapdragon 400; MSM8926	
Battery		Lumia 540	Lumia 640	Lumia 640 XL
Max. claimed longevity hours	Video playback time	6.9	8.6	10.6
Max. claimed longevity hours	Wi-Fi network browsing	10.1	10.8	14.2
Capacity mAh		2200	2500	3000
Removable		Yes	Yes	Yes
Technology		TBC		
Camera		Lumia 540	Lumia 640	Lumia 640 XL
Front camera	Aperture	f/2.4		f/2.2
Front camera	Megapixels	5	0.9	5
Front camera	Video Resolution	FWVGA (848 × 480)	HD (1280 × 720)	FHD (1080 × 1920)
Main camera	Autofocus	Yes	Yes	Yes
Main camera	Aperture	f/2.2		f/2.0
Main camera	Carl Zeiss Optics	No	No	Yes
Main camera	Digital zoom with pixel binning	No	No	No
Main camera	Flash	LED	LED	LED
Main camera	Focal length mm (in)	28 mm		
Main camera	Megapixels	8	8	13
Main camera	Optical image stabilization	No	No	No
Main camera	Sensor size inches	1/4		1/3
Main camera	Video frame rate fps	30		
Main camera	Video resolution	FWVGA (848 × 480)	FHD (1080 × 1920)	
Lossless image format (DNG)		No	No	No
Sensors		Lumia 540	Lumia 640	Lumia 640 XL
Accelerometer		Yes	Yes	Yes
Ambient light sensor		Yes	Yes	Yes
Gyroscope		No	No	No
Magnetometer		No	Yes	Yes
Microphones		Yes	Yes	Yes
Proximity sensor		Yes	Yes	Yes
SensorCore			Yes	Yes
Connectivity		Lumia 540	Lumia 640	Lumia 640 XL
SIM	Number of slots	2	Single/dual variants	
SIM	Size	Micro-SIM		
AV Connectors		3.5mm audio jack		
Bluetooth		4.0		
Charging/data transfer		Micro USB		
NFC (secure)			LTE variants only	Yes
Wi-Fi		b/g/n		
Qi Wireless charging		No	No	No
Miscellaneous		Lumia 540	Lumia 640	Lumia 640 XL
FM radio		Yes	Yes	Yes
Digital TV		No	No	No
Models		Lumia 540	Lumia 640	Lumia 640 XL

== Fifth generation (Windows 10 Mobile) ==
Fifth generation (Windows 10 Mobile)
Models		Lumia 550	Lumia 650	Lumia 950	Lumia 950 XL
Date announced		October 2015	February 2016	October 2015	
Highest supported operating system version		Windows 10 Mobile (1709)			
Physical specifications		Lumia 550	Lumia 650	Lumia 950	Lumia 950 XL
Dimensions mm (in)	height	136.1 (5.36)	142 (5.6)	145 (5.7)	151.9 (5.98)
Dimensions mm (in)	width	67.8 (2.67)	70.9 (2.79)	73.2 (2.88)	78.4 (3.09)
Dimensions mm (in)	depth	9.9 (0.39)	6.9 (0.27)	8.2 (0.32)	8.1 (0.32)
Colors					
Weight g (oz)		141.9 (5.01)	122 (4.3)	150 (5.3)	165 (5.8)
Memory		Lumia 550	Lumia 650	Lumia 950	Lumia 950 XL
Expandable		microSD, up to 200 GB			
Internal		8 GB	16 GB	32 GB	
RAM		1 GB		3 GB LPDDR3	3 GB LPDDR4
Display		Lumia 550	Lumia 650	Lumia 950	Lumia 950 XL
Diagonal size in (mm)		4.7 (120)	5.0 (130)	5.2 (130)	5.7 (140)
Enhancements		—	ClearBlack polarizer		
Glance		Yes	Yes	Yes	Yes
Gorilla glass		No	Gorilla Glass 3	Gorilla Glass 3	Gorilla Glass 4
On-screen buttons		Yes	Yes	Yes	Yes
Pixel density ppi		315	297	564	518
Resolution pixels		1280 × 720		2560 × 1440	
Super Sensitive Touch		No	No	No	No
Technology		LCD	AMOLED		
Technology		Lumia 550	Lumia 650	Lumia 950	Lumia 950 XL
Networks	GSM	850/900/1800/1900			
Networks	LTE	Band 1/3/7/8/20	Single SIM variant: 1/3/7/8/20; Dual SIM variant: 1/2/3/4/5/7/8/20/28	Band 1/2/3/4/5/7/8/12/17/20/28	
Networks	UMTS	Band 1/5/8	Single SIM variant: 1/5/8; Dual SIM variant: 1/2/4/5/8	Band 1/2/4/5/8	
CPU architecture		Quad (4) core, 28 nm		Hexa (6) core, 20 nm	Octa (8) core, 20 nm
CPU speed GHz		1.1	1.3	1.8	2.0
GPU		Adreno 304		Adreno 418	Adreno 430
Soc		Qualcomm Snapdragon 210; MSM8909	Qualcomm Snapdragon 212; MSM8909 v2	Qualcomm Snapdragon 808; MSM8992	Qualcomm Snapdragon 810; MSM8994
Battery		Lumia 550	Lumia 650	Lumia 950	Lumia 950 XL
Max. claimed longevity hours	Video playback time	7.1	—	10.0	11
Max. claimed longevity hours	Wi-Fi network browsing	10	—	9.5	11.0
Capacity mAh		2100	2000	3000	3340
Removable		Yes	Yes	Yes	Yes
Technology		Lithium-ion			
Camera		Lumia 550	Lumia 650	Lumia 950	Lumia 950 XL
Front camera	Aperture	f/2.8	f/2.2	f/2.4	
Front camera	Megapixels	2	5		
Front camera	Video Resolution	VGA (640 × 480)	HD (1280 × 720)	FHD (1080 × 1920)	
Main camera	Autofocus	Yes	Yes	Yes	Yes
Main camera	Aperture	f/2.4	f/2.2	f/1.9	
Main camera	Flash	Yes	Yes	Yes	Yes
Main camera	Focal length mm (in)	28 mm		26 mm	
Main camera	Megapixels	5.0	8.0	20.0	
Main camera	Optical image stabilization	No	No	Yes	Yes
Main camera	Sensor size inches	1/4		1/2.4	
Main camera	Video frame rate fps	30			
Main camera	Video resolution	HD (1280 × 720)		4K (3840 × 2160)	
Dedicated camera button		No	No	Yes	Yes
Lossless image format (DNG)					
Sensors		Lumia 550	Lumia 650	Lumia 950	Lumia 950 XL
Windows Hello	Fingerprint scanner	No	No	No	No
Windows Hello	Infrared Iris Scanner	No	No	Yes	Yes
Accelerometer		Yes	Yes	Yes	Yes
Ambient light sensor		Yes	Yes	Yes	Yes
Barometer		No	No	Yes	Yes
Gyroscope		No	No	Yes	Yes
Magnetometer		No	No	Yes	Yes
Microphones		Yes	2	4	4
Proximity sensor		Yes	Yes	Yes	Yes
SensorCore		No	No	Yes	Yes
Connectivity		Lumia 550	Lumia 650	Lumia 950	Lumia 950 XL
SIM	Number of slots	Single	Single/dual variants		
SIM	Size	Nano-SIM			
AV Connectors	Audio	3.5mm audio jack			
AV Connectors	Video	—	—	DisplayPort over USB-C	
Bluetooth		4.1			
Charging/data transfer		Micro Type-B USB 2.0		USB 3.1 Type-C	
Miracast		No	No	Yes	Yes
NFC (secure)		No	Yes	Yes	Yes
Wi-Fi		b/g/n		a/b/g/n/ac	
Qi Wireless charging		No	No	fast charging	fast charging
Miscellaneous		Lumia 550	Lumia 650	Lumia 950	Lumia 950 XL
Continuum		No	No	Yes	Yes
FM radio		Yes	Yes	No	Yes
Models		Lumia 550	Lumia 650	Lumia 950	Lumia 950 XL

== See also ==
- Comparison of Google Nexus smartphones
- List of iPhone models
- Comparison of Samsung Galaxy S smartphones
- History of mobile phones
