= Microsoft Lumia 532 =

Entry-level Windows Smartphone from Microsoft Mobile

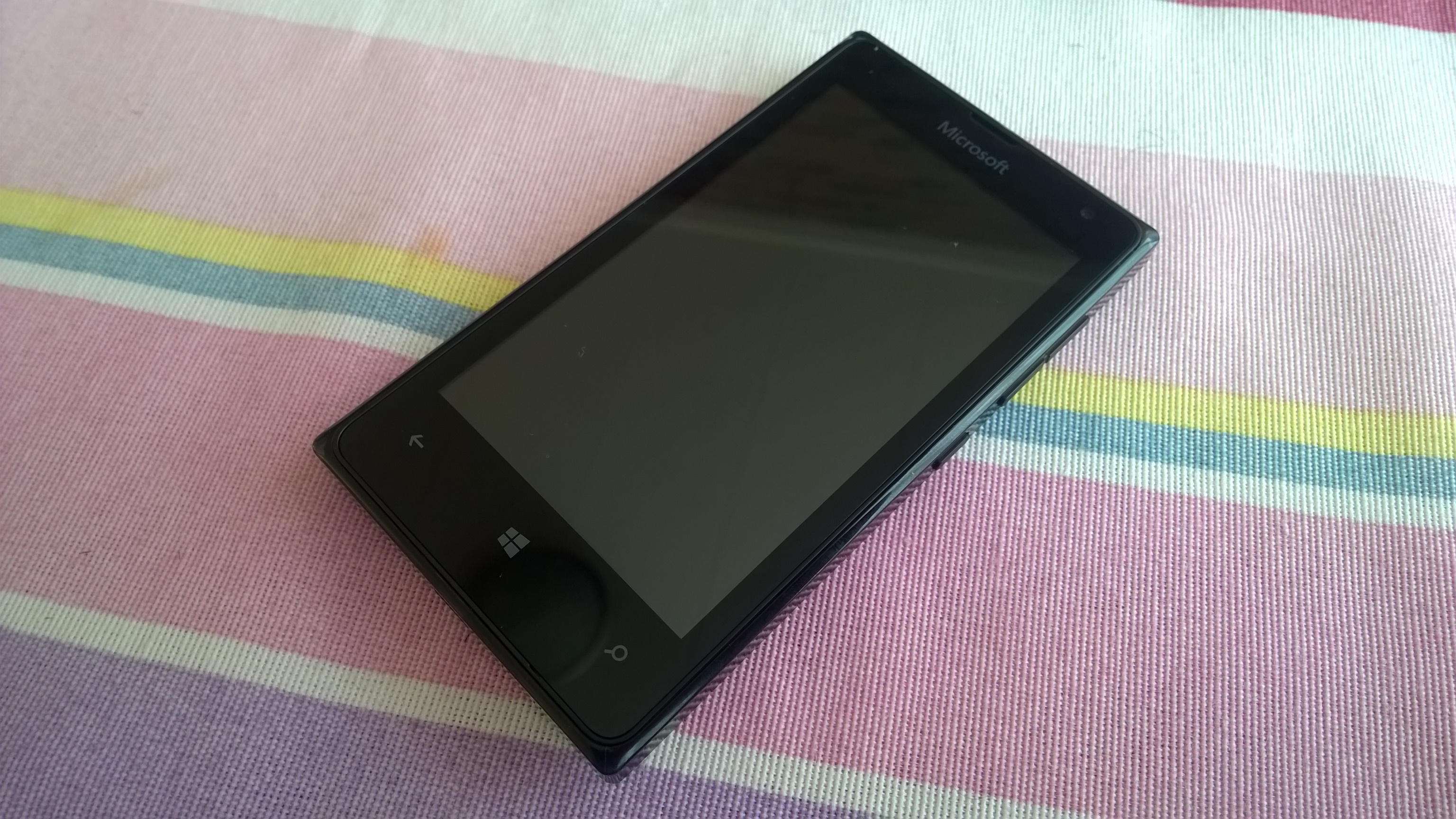
- Microsoft Lumia 532
- Brand: Microsoft
- Manufacturer: Microsoft Mobile (Microsoft)
- Type: Smartphone
- Series: Lumia
- First released: 14 January 2015
- Predecessor: Nokia Lumia 530
- Successor: Microsoft Lumia 540
- Related: Microsoft Lumia 430
- Form factor: Slate
- Dimensions: 118,9 x 65,5 x 11,6 mm
- Weight: 136 g (5 oz)
- Operating system: Windows Phone 8.1 Upgradeable to Windows 10 Mobile
- CPU: 1.2 GHz Qualcomm Snapdragon Quad-Core processor
- GPU: Adreno 302
- Memory: 1 GB RAM
- Storage: 8 GB internal
- Removable storage: Up to 128GB
- Battery: 3.8 V 1560 mAh
- Rear camera: 5 MP (480p recording)
- Front camera: .3 MP VGA(480)
- Display: 4-inch TFT LCD, 480x800 resolution (233ppi)
- Connectivity: 802.11b/g/n Wi-Fi, Bluetooth 4.0
- Data inputs: Multi-touch capacitive touchscreen
- Website: Microsoft Lumia 532 at the Wayback Machine (archived January 24, 2015)

The Microsoft Lumia 532 is an entry-level smartphone developed by Microsoft Mobile that runs the Windows Phone 8.1 Operating System and is upgradable to Windows 10 Mobile operating system.

Along with the Microsoft Lumia 435, it is believed to be based on designs from the cancelled Nokia X family.

The Microsoft Lumia 532 has been criticised for its lackluster battery power for a device in its price range.

== Specifications ==
=== Hardware ===
The Lumia 532 has a 4.0-inch IPS LCD, quad-core 1.2 GHz Cortex-A7 Qualcomm Snapdragon 200 processor, 1 GB of RAM and 8 GB of internal storage that can be expanded using microSD cards up to 256 GB. The phone has a 1560 mAh Li-ion battery, 5-megapixel rear camera and VGA front-facing camera. It is available in black, white, green and orange.

=== Software ===
The Lumia 532 ships with Windows Phone 8.1.

== See also ==
- Microsoft Lumia
- Microsoft Lumia 435
- Microsoft Lumia 535
