= Nokia Lumia 620 =

Smartphone

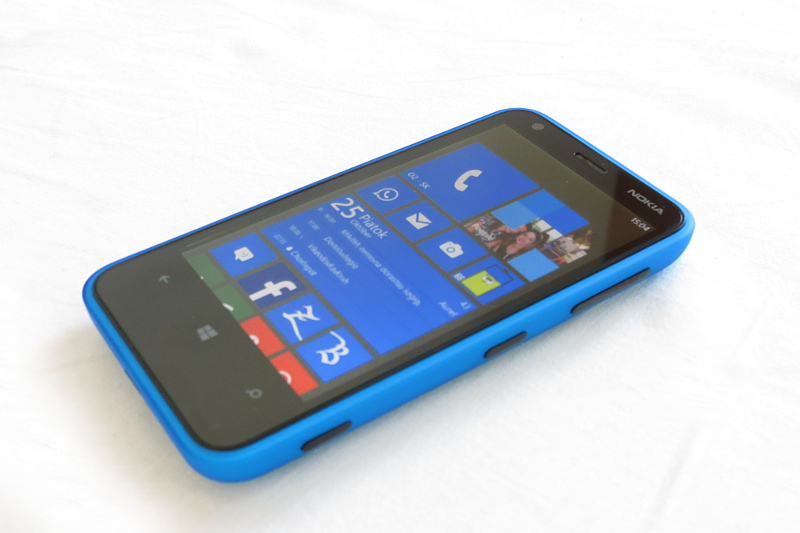
- Nokia Lumia 620
- Manufacturer: Nokia
- Type: Smartphone
- Series: Lumia
- First released: Jan 2013
- Availability by region: January 2013
- Discontinued: 2015
- Predecessor: Nokia Lumia 610
- Successor: Nokia Lumia 625
- Compatible networks: GSM/GPRS/EDGE 850/900/1800/1900; HSPA 850/900/1900/2100; Wi-Fi, NFC
- Form factor: Slate
- Dimensions: 115.4 mm (4.54 in) H 61.1 mm (2.41 in) W 11.0 mm (0.43 in) D
- Weight: 127 g (4.5 oz)
- Operating system: Windows Phone 8.1
- System-on-chip: Qualcomm Snapdragon S4 Plus
- CPU: 1.0 GHz dual-core Qualcomm Krait MSM8227
- GPU: Adreno 305
- Memory: 8 GB internal flash 512 MB RAM
- Removable storage: Hot Swappable, MicroSD (up to 64 GB)
- Battery: Removable/Rechargeable BL-4J 1300 mAh
- Rear camera: 5.0-megapixel, 2592 × 1936 pixels, LED flash, autofocus, tap to focus, 720p@30fps video recording
- Front camera: 0.3 MP, 640×480 Megapixel, VGA video recording
- Display: 3.8" IPS LCD ClearBlack capacitive touchscreen 800×480 px 16.7m-color, RGB Stripe, colour boost
- Connectivity: 3.5mm headset jack, USB 2.0, Bluetooth 4.0+LE, dual-band 802.11a/b/g/n, NFC; A-GPS, GLONASS
- Data inputs: 10 point Multi-touch capacitive touchscreen, super-sensitive touch, Nokia Glance Screen, proximity sensor, orientation sensor, sunlight readability enhancements, pedometer, ambient light sensor, accelerometer, Magnetometer, Double tap to wake
- Other: Talk time: Up to 14 hours (3G), 9.9 hours (WCDMA); Standby time: Up to 330 hours (approx. 13.8 days); Music playback time: Up to 61 hours file manager = file (Microsoft present)
- Website: Nokia Lumia 620

The Nokia Lumia 620 was an entry-level smartphone designed, developed and marketed by Nokia. It was the successor to the Lumia 610, and was one of the first Nokia phones to implement Windows Phone 8 alongside the Nokia Lumia 920 and Nokia Lumia 820. Although sharing a similar name with the Lumia 610, the Lumia 620 is a major upgrade, using a 1.0 GHz dual-core processor. It also has exchangeable back covers which come in black, white, magenta, yellow, cyan, and more.

It was announced in December 2012 and started selling in January 2013 in Asia, followed by Europe and the Middle East at an estimated street price of US$249. In the United States, the Nokia Lumia 620 was available for AT&T's subsidiary brand Aio Wireless. It was discontinued in 2015

Like other Lumia devices with Windows Phone 8, Nokia added these applications: HERE Drive+, HERE Maps, HERE City Lens, Nokia Mix Radio (select markets), Nokia Smartshoot, Nokia Cinemagraph. With subsequent Nokia Amber and Nokia Black updates, they added Nokia Camera, Nokia Glance, Glance Background, Storage Check, Data Sense and several other minor enhancements which were supplied by Microsoft as part of their general distribution release.

Because of the limited memory available on this phone, certain applications and features were not able to run.

On July 23, 2013, a variant of the Nokia Lumia 620, the Nokia Lumia 625, was released with a bigger display, 4G support, faster processor, larger battery and 1080p video recording. However, this model lacked certain features like Nokia Glance and some sensors for which it lacked the ability to run applications including Nokia City Lens

Along with Lumia 810 and 928, this model did not get FM Radio support upon updating to Windows Phone "Amber". Reasons range from the model not having the FM radio chip to the design of the casing (and earphone plug) not supporting the connection for the antenna required.

== Specifications ==
=== Hardware ===
The Lumia 620 came with a 3.8-inch capacitive touchscreen LCD. It was uses a dual-core 1.0 GHz Krait Qualcomm Snapdragon S4 processor and has 512 MB of RAM. The phone has 8 GB of internal storage that can be expanded using MicroSD cards up to 64 GB.

The Lumia 620 has a 1300 mAh Li-ion battery, 5-megapixel rear camera and VGA front-facing camera. It was available in lime green, orange, magenta, yellow, cyan, white and black.

=== Software ===
The Lumia 620 came with Windows Phone 8 and was upgradeable to Windows Phone 8.1.

== Reception ==
Engadget reviewed the phone very positively. It praised its battery life, performance, and value for money. It noted that the camera was not very good but okay considering that the 620 is a budget phone.

James Rogerson of TechRadar in his review wrote: "There's not a whole lot that the Nokia Lumia 620 does wrong. As an all-round, jack of all trades budget handset it does a great job. We'd love it if the screen was slightly bigger or it had a little bit more RAM, but for the price we can't really complain. The only real issue is the battery, and that's an issue to some extent with every Windows Phone 8 right now."

== See also ==
- Microsoft Lumia
