= Microsoft Lumia 650 =

Windows 10 Mobile Smartphone from Microsoft

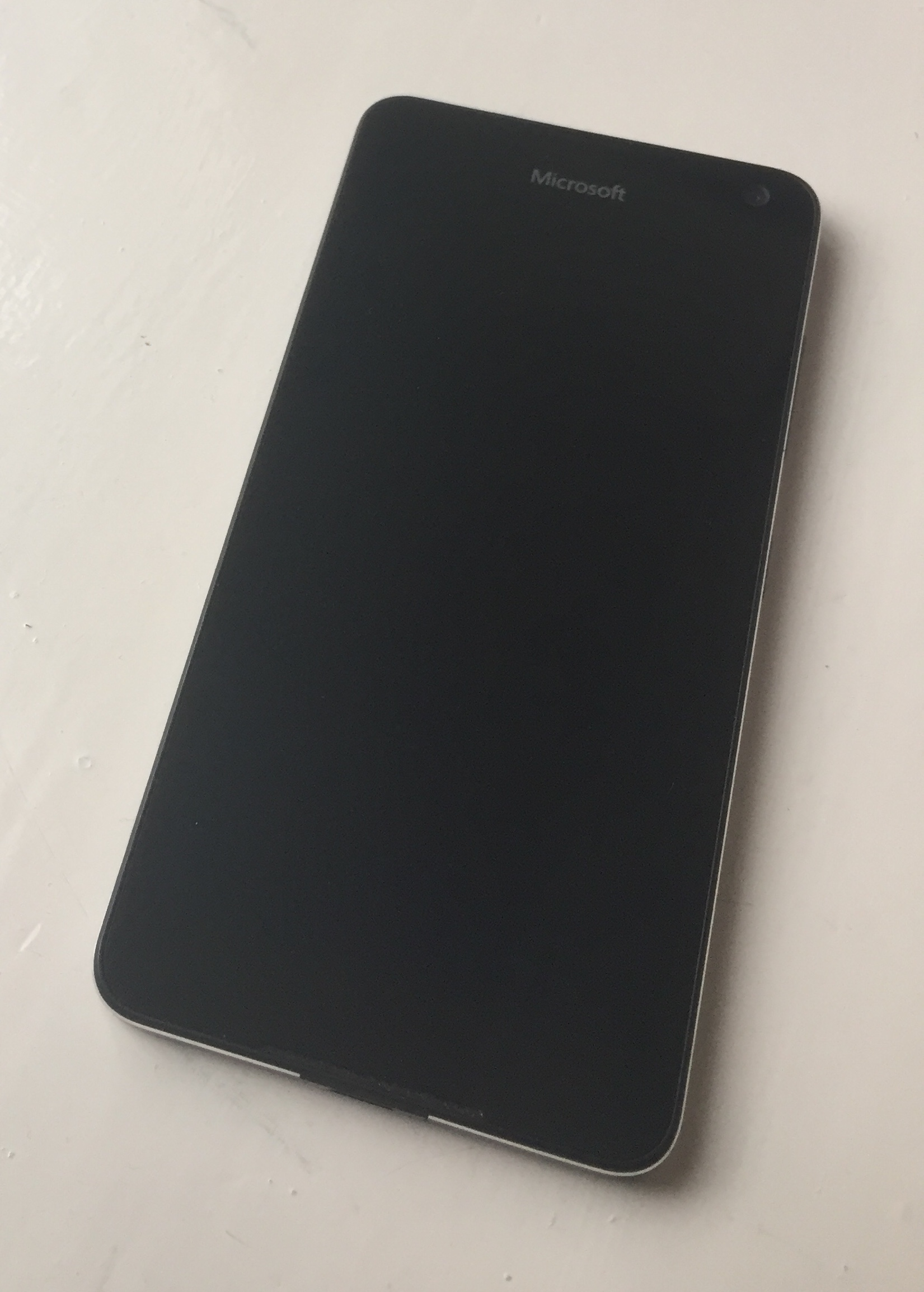
- Microsoft Lumia 650
- Brand: Microsoft
- Manufacturer: Microsoft Mobile
- Type: Smartphone
- Series: Lumia
- First released: February 15, 2016
- Discontinued: October 2017
- Predecessor: Microsoft Lumia 640
- Successor: Nokia 6, Surface Duo
- Compatible networks: GSM, HSPA, LTE
- Form factor: Slate
- Dimensions: 142 mm (5.6 in) H 70.9 mm (2.79 in) W 6.9 mm (0.27 in) D
- Weight: 122 g (4.30 oz)
- Operating system: Windows 10 Mobile
- System-on-chip: Qualcomm Snapdragon 212 MSM8909 v2
- CPU: 1.3 GHz quad-core ARM Cortex-A7
- GPU: Qualcomm Adreno 304 clocked at 400 MHz
- Memory: 1 GB
- Storage: 16 GB
- Removable storage: microSD up to 200 GB
- Battery: User replaceable 2000 mAh Li-Ion battery
- Rear camera: 8 MP 1/4 in sensor f/2.2 aperture LED flash
- Front camera: 5 MP f/2.2 aperture 720p video
- Display: 5 in (130 mm) HD (1280x720) OLED, 297 ppi, Gorilla Glass 3
- Connectivity: HSDPA (850, 900, 2100 MHz), GSM (850, 900, 1800, 1900 MHz), Wi-Fi (802.11 b/g/n), Bluetooth 4.1, GPS, GLONASS, BeiDou; LTE (Bands 1, 3, 7, 8, 20: 2100, 1800, 2600, 900, 800)
- Data inputs: Multi-touch capacitive touchscreen
- Website: Microsoft Lumia 650

The Microsoft Lumia 650 is a smartphone developed by Microsoft, officially revealed on February 15, 2016. It is the successor to the Microsoft Lumia 640 and is aimed primarily at business users, with support for Microsoft's business applications as well as security features like device encryption and remote wiping. Due to hardware limitations, it does not support Continuum. The phone was available in both single- and dual-SIM variants and is the most recent model in the Lumia series, with Microsoft discontinuing Lumia hardware production the following year, pivoting to dual-screen devices under the Surface Duo brand.

== Availability ==
In the United Kingdom, the Lumia 650 is available from EE, O2 and Vodafone.

In the United States, the Lumia 650 is available from Cricket Wireless.

In Canada, the United States, Malaysia, Singapore and Thailand, the Lumia 650 was available unlocked from the Microsoft Store.

== Hardware ==
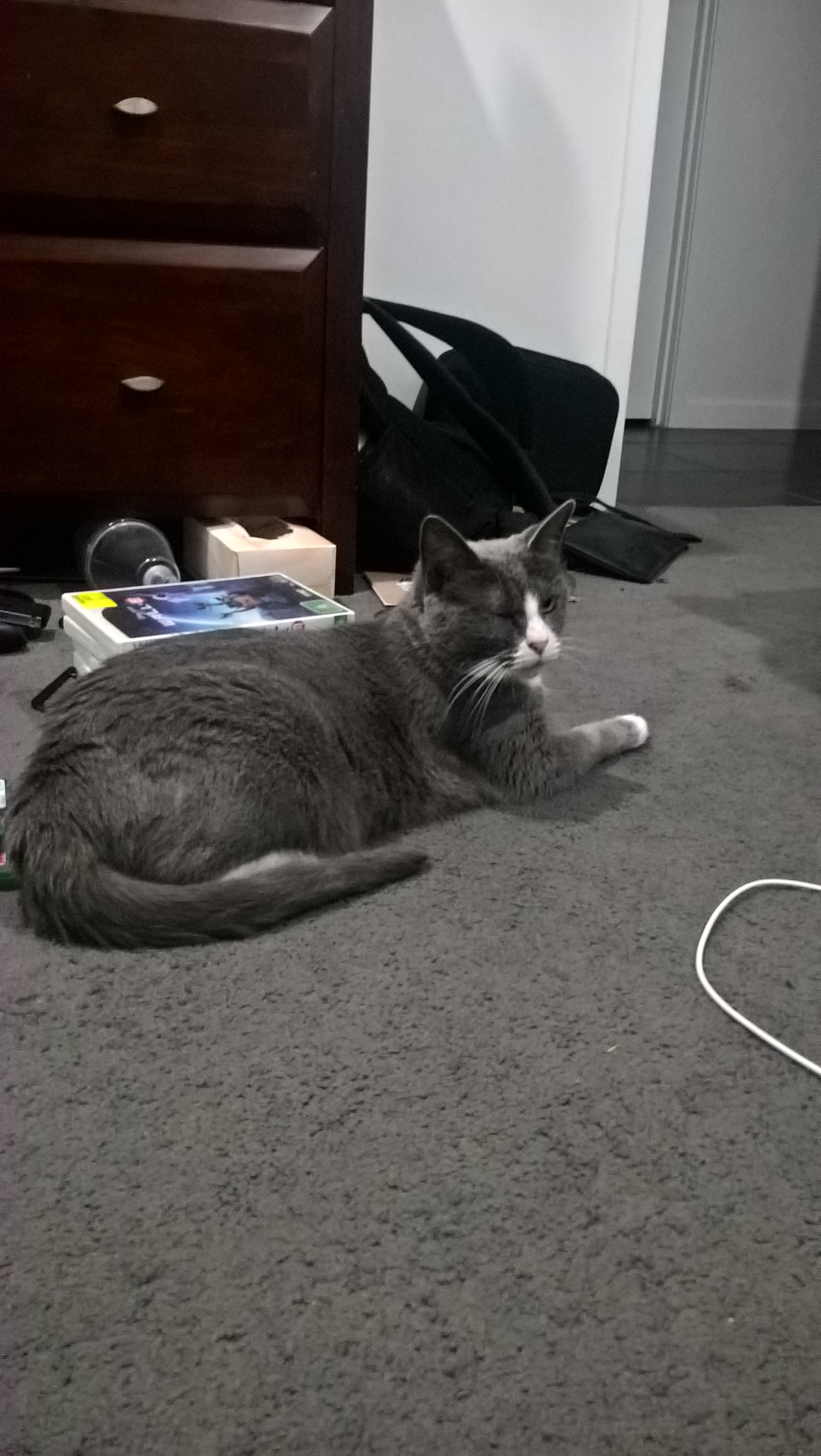
A picture of a cat taken on the Lumia 650's front camera.

The Lumia 650 has a 5-inch pentile OLED display with Corning Gorilla Glass 3 protection and oleophobic (fingerprint-resistant) coating. It is powered by a 1.3 GHz quad-core Qualcomm Snapdragon 212 processor, 1 GB of RAM and 16 GB of internal storage with up to 200 GB expandable storage via microSD cards. It has a removable 2000 mAh Li-ion battery, 8 megapixel rear camera with LED flash and 5 megapixel wide-angle front-facing camera. It was available in black and white.

Unlike its predecessor, the Lumia 650 is built with an anodized metal frame design, which gives it a distinctive premium look and feel compared to its high-end siblings, the Microsoft Lumia 950 and Microsoft Lumia 950 XL.

== Software ==
The Lumia 650 originally launched with the Windows 10 Mobile November Update (also known as Version 1511). In August 2016, Microsoft released the Windows 10 Mobile Anniversary Update (also known as Windows 10 Mobile Version 1607). The rollout of the Windows 10 Mobile Creators Update (Version 1703) began on April 25, 2017, following a rollout to Windows Insiders.

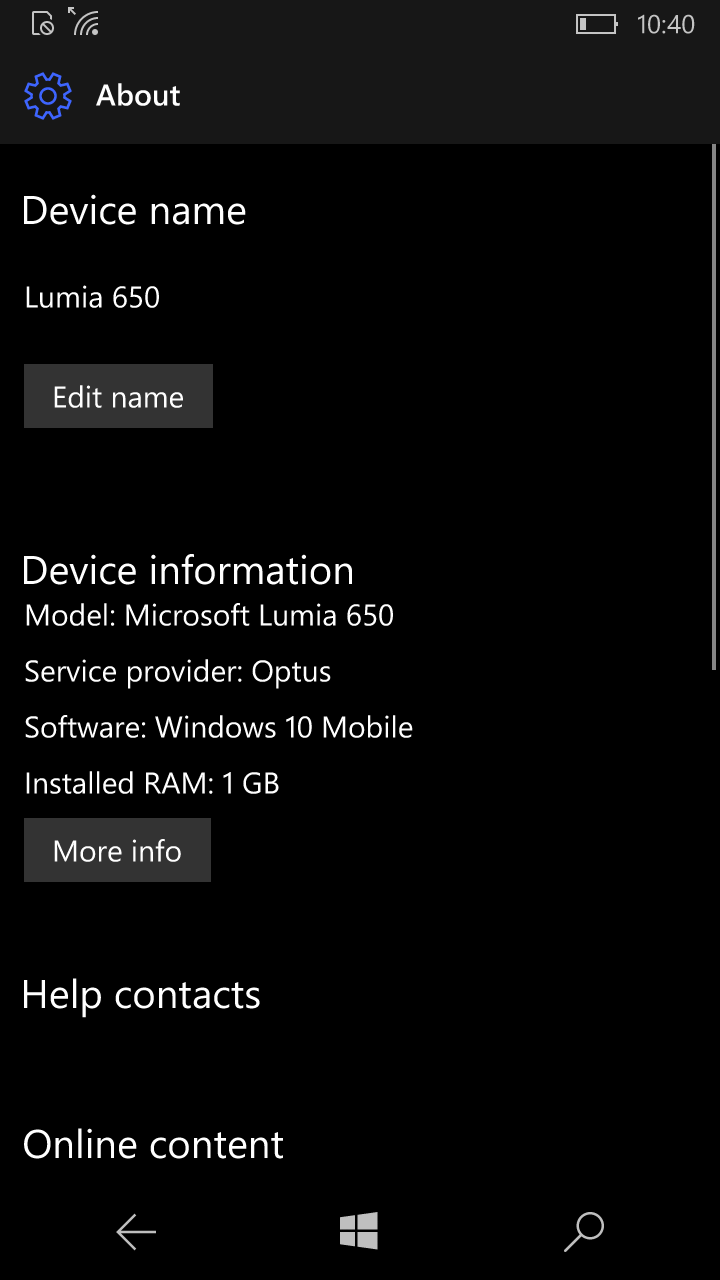
A screenshot of the Lumia's "About" screen.

== Reception ==
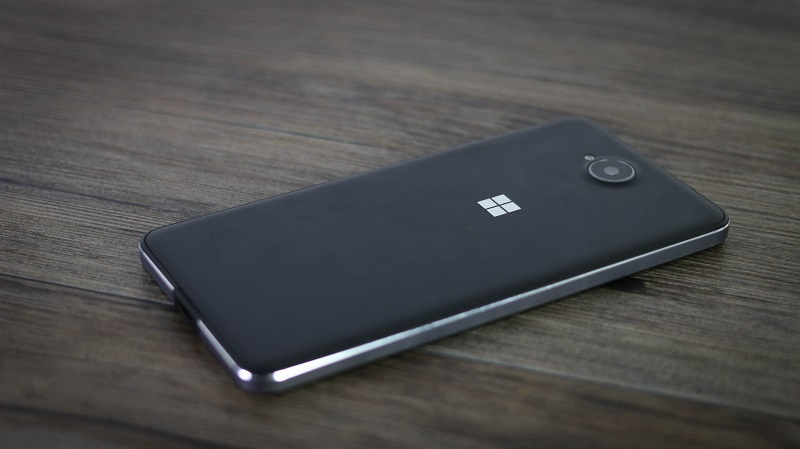
Back of the Lumia 650 (black version)

The Lumia 650 was generally well-received, with most reviewers commending the design, display quality and low price. The main points of criticism were performance and stability.

Richard Devine of Windows Central praised the design of the Lumia 650, calling it "easily the best looking Lumia in the current lineup". While some performance problems were noted, especially in graphically intensive games, overall usability for everyday tasks was found to be acceptable. The reviewer also noted a number of bugs in Windows 10 Mobile, but most of those were fixed in a subsequent operating system update.

Steve Litchfield of All About Windows Phone gave the Lumia 650 a score of 83%, regarding it as a considerable upgrade from the Lumia 550, but expressing disappointment at the low-end Snapdragon 212 chipset. The phone was compared favourably to the Lumia 830, with the reviewer noting that it's "the nicest feeling Windows Phone I've ever held" and concluding that it's "the perfect smartphone to hand out in companies".

Rich Woods of Neowin gave the Lumia 650 a very favourable review, calling it "a budget device that punches well above its weight". The design was described as "stunning" and the display was said to have "vibrant colors and deep blacks". The reviewer also commended camera performance, noting the lack of 1080p video capture as the only drawback. Overall performance was found to be excellent considering the price tag, with idle battery life being the main point of criticism.

GSMArena commended the design as "gorgeous" and described the phone as feeling "almost unnaturally light", while also praising the display's sunlight legibility and colour accuracy. The review also noted multiple performance and stability issues with Windows 10 Mobile and pointed out Continuum and Windows Hello as significant missing features.

Alastair Stevenson of Trusted Reviews criticised the performance and described the camera as "uninspired", but considered the design and display to be better than most affordable smartphones. The reviewer also remarked that "for business users the Lumia 650 ticks all the right boxes".

Katharine Byrne of IT Pro gave the phone two stars out of five, calling it "A Windows 10 phone that entirely misses the point of Windows 10" due to the lack of Continuum, and criticising the phone's performance in benchmarks. While the design and display were commended, overall verdict for the phone was "rather forgettable".

Phone Arena commended the phone's design, build quality and camera performance, but noted a few issues with the out-of-the-box experience as well as the camera. Overall the phone was deemed "a solid choice for an entry-level Windows 10 handset".

Tom Warren of The Verge praised the phone's high-end look and aluminum feel as well as its light weight. However, he found many drawbacks such as an underpowered processor and the lack of Continuum.

== See also ==
- Microsoft Lumia
- Nokia Lumia 630
- Nokia Lumia 1320
- Microsoft Lumia 640
- Microsoft Surface Duo
