= Microsoft Lumia 535 =

Windows Mobile Smartphone created by Microsoft Mobile

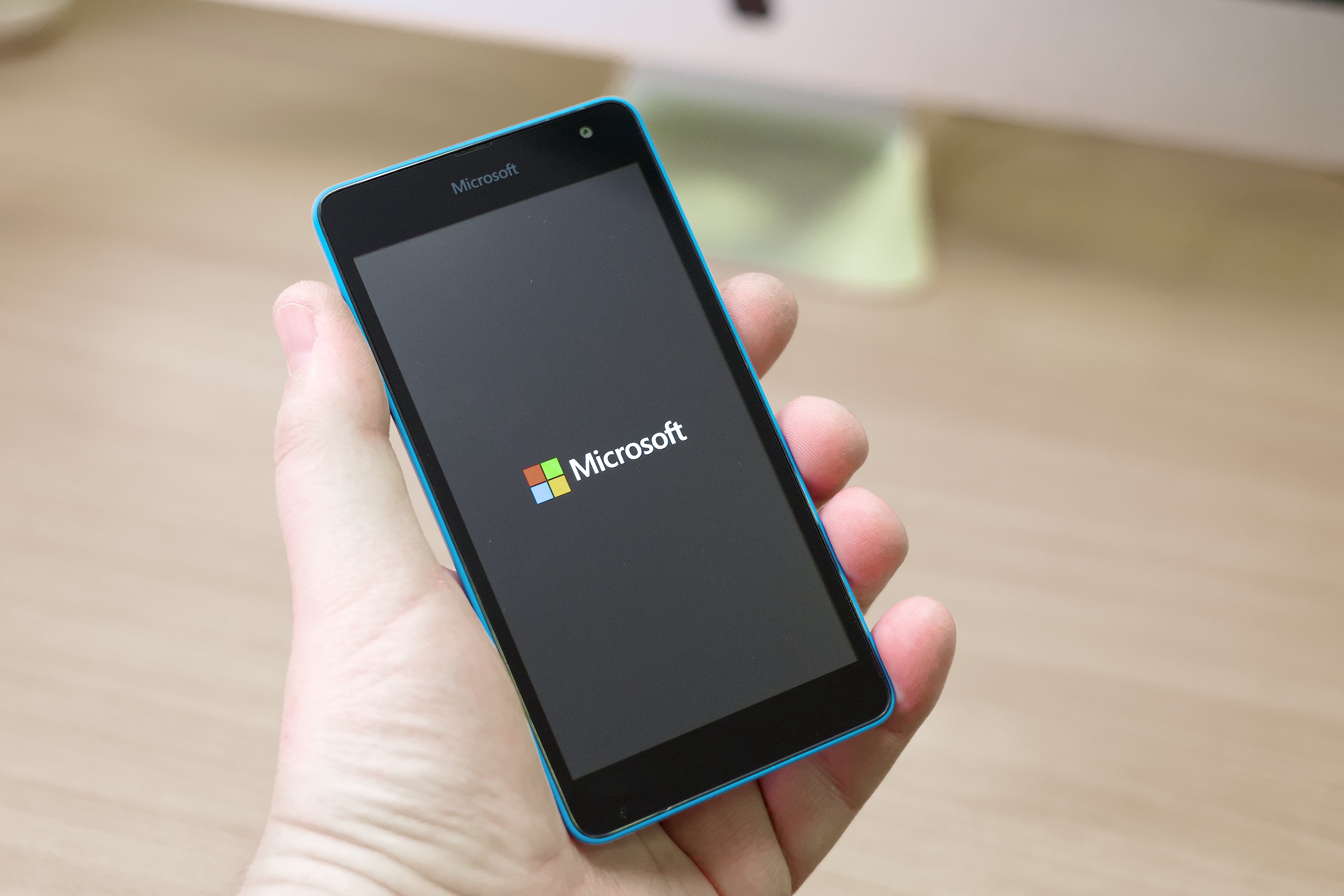
- Microsoft Lumia 535
- Brand: Microsoft
- Manufacturer: Compal Electronics
- Type: Smartphone
- Series: Lumia
- First released: 10 November 2014
- Predecessor: Nokia Lumia 530
- Successor: Microsoft Lumia 540; HMD Nokia 5
- Related: Microsoft Lumia 430
- Compatible networks: GSM/GPRS/EDGE 850/900/1800/1900; HSPA 900/2100 (+ 850/1900 for RM-1018/RM-1020)
- Form factor: Slate
- Dimensions: 140.2 mm (5.52 in) H 72.4 mm (2.85 in) W 8.8 mm (0.35 in) D
- Weight: 146 g (5.1 oz)
- Operating system: Windows Phone 8.1 (Lumia Denim) (Upgradable to Windows 10 Mobile)
- System-on-chip: Qualcomm Snapdragon 200 MSM8212
- CPU: 1.2 GHz quad-core ARM Cortex A7
- GPU: Qualcomm Adreno 302
- Memory: 1 GB RAM
- Storage: 8 GB Internal
- Removable storage: 128 GB, microSD
- Battery: 1905 mAh
- Rear camera: 5 MP auto-focus, f/2.4 with LED flash, FWVGA 848x480 video
- Front camera: 5 MP
- Display: 5-inch IPS LCD, 540x960 resolution, 220ppi, Corning Gorilla Glass 3
- Connectivity: Bluetooth 4.0 + LE; Assisted GPS; GPS/GLONASS; Micro-USB 2.0; Wi-Fi :802.11b/g/n, WiFi Hotspot; Wi-Fi-based positioning system (WPS); FM radio, Internet radio
- Data inputs: Multi-touch capacitive touchscreen
- Other: Talk time (2G): up to 11 hours Talk time (3G): 13 h Stand-by time: up to 23 days Maximum cellular network browsing time: 8.5 h Music playback time: 78 h
- Website: Microsoft Lumia 535 at the Wayback Machine (archived November 11, 2014)

The Microsoft Lumia 535 is an entry-level smartphone developed by Microsoft Mobile that runs the Windows Phone 8.1 OS and is upgradable to Windows 10 Mobile. The phone features a 5-inch display. It is equipped with a 5 MP front-facing camera. It is the first Microsoft-branded phone to be used after its acquisition of Nokia's mobile phone business.

On May 16, 2015, Microsoft released its successor, the Microsoft Lumia 540, with a better display and an improved camera.

== Specifications ==
=== Hardware ===
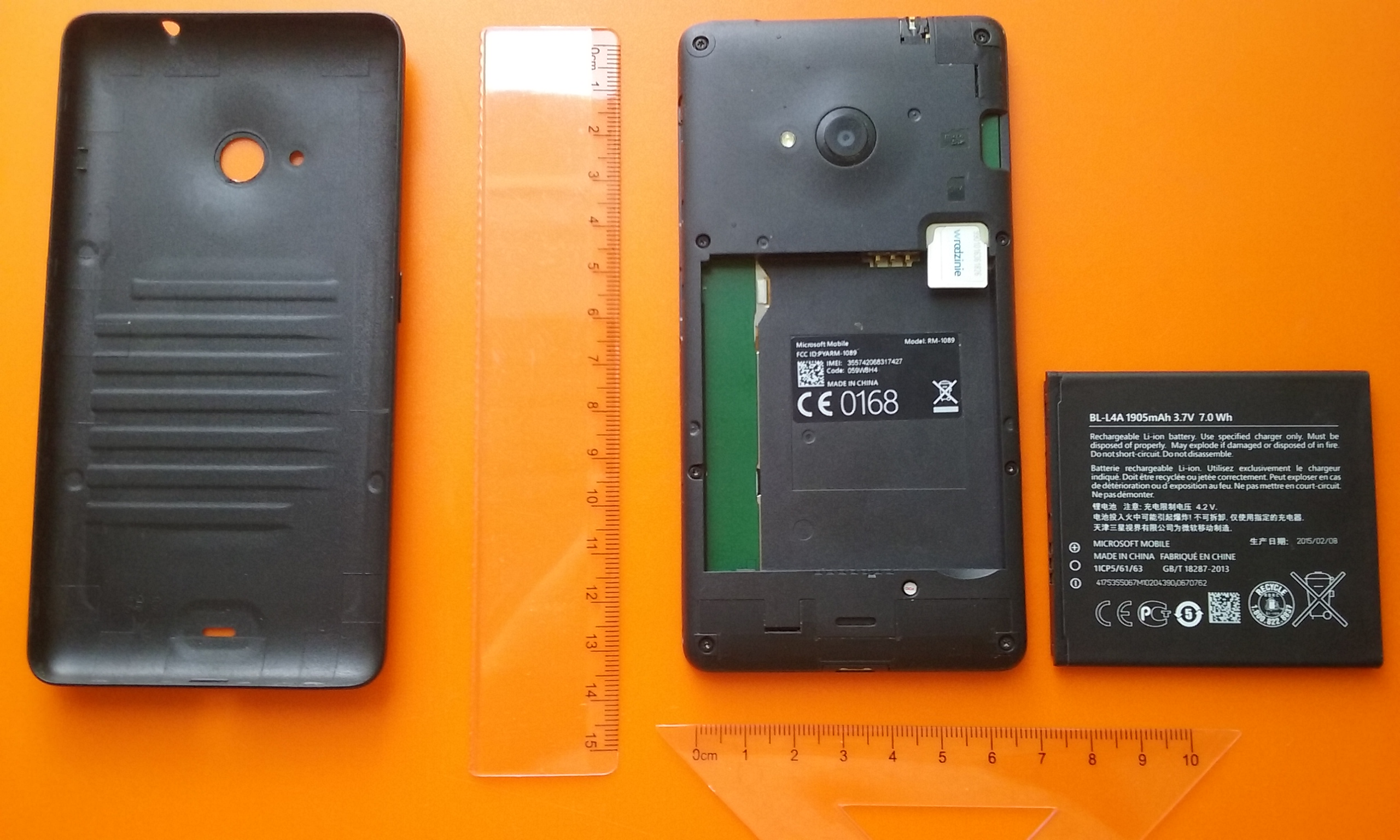
Microsoft Lumia 535 (RM–1089)

The Lumia 535 comes with a 5.0" IPS LCD and 5 MP cameras on both the front and the back. The phone has 1 GB of RAM and 8 GB of built-in storage, and is powered by a quad-core 1.2 GHz Snapdragon 200 CPU and Adreno 302 GPU. Battery capacity is 1905 mAh and the phone is available in orange, green, white, black, gray and blue.

=== Software ===
The Lumia 535 ships with Windows Phone 8.1 Update 2 (through the Lumia Denim update) and is upgradeable to Windows 10 Mobile.

== Reception ==
Jim Martin from PC Advisor wrote: "We're fans of Windows Phone 8.1 but the Lumia 535 compromises in too many areas to make it a bargain at £100. You're better off with a Motorola Moto E or – if you want 4G – the EE Kestrel."

Katharine Byrne from Expert Reviews wrote that "Microsoft's Lumia 535 is well-built, but poor battery life and a fussy touchscreen makes it frustrating to use."

According to Microsoft, the Lumia 535 became the best-selling mid-range smartphone in Pakistan.

== Issues ==
Since the release, users have detected numerous problems regarding the phone's touch screen. Microsoft has stated that these problems are caused by a software bug and released an update in January 2015 to fix it. Another update in March partially fixed the issue and users who are still experiencing the issue are advised to contact Microsoft Care.

== See also ==
- Microsoft Lumia
- Microsoft Lumia 532
