= Nokia Lumia 810 =

Smartphone model

- Manufacturer: Nokia
- Type: Smartphone
- Series: Lumia
- First released: USA Q4 2012
- Discontinued: Q2 2013
- Predecessor: Nokia Lumia 800
- Successor: Nokia Lumia 830
- Related: Nokia Lumia 820, Nokia Lumia 822, Nokia Lumia 920
- Compatible networks: HSPA+
- Dimensions: 127.8 mm (5.03 in) H 68.4 mm (2.69 in) W 10.9 mm (0.43 in) D
- Weight: 145 g (5.1 oz)
- Operating system: Windows Phone 8
- System-on-chip: Qualcomm Snapdragon S4
- CPU: 1.5 GHz Qualcomm Snapdragon S4, dual-core
- GPU: Qualcomm Adreno 225
- Memory: 1 GB RAM
- Storage: 8 GB internal flash
- Removable storage: microSD, up to 64 GB
- Battery: Rechargeable BP-4W 3.7V 6.7Wh 1800mAh Lithium polymer battery
- Rear camera: 8.0 Megapixel, 3264 x 2448 pixels, f/2.2, Short Pulse High Power Dual-LED flash, autofocus, Carl Zeiss optics, 1080p video capture
- Front camera: 1.3-megapixel, 1280 x 960 pixels, 720p video capture
- Display: 4.3" AMOLED ClearBlack capacitive touchscreen, 800 x 480 pixels at 216.97 ppi, 16.7m-color, RGB Stripe, Gorilla Glass 2
- Connectivity: Bluetooth 3.0, Wi-Fi 802.11a/b/g/n, NFC, microUSB v2.0
- Data inputs: Multi-touch capacitive touchscreen
- Other: Talk time: Up to 10.2 hours Standby time: Up to 360 hours (approx. 15 days)
- Website: Nokia Lumia 810

The Nokia Lumia 810 is a Windows Phone smartphone made by Nokia exclusively for wireless carrier T-Mobile US. It was announced on October 8, 2012. The device runs the then-new Windows Phone 8 operating system (despite being numbered in the x10 series which is used for Windows Phone 7) and features a 4.3-inch AMOLED WVGA ClearBlack display, an 8-megapixel rear-facing camera, a 1.5 GHz Snapdragon processor, exchangeable shells (cyan and black) and supports Qi inductive charging when equipped with a specific shell. It supports T-Mobile's 4G network.

The phone includes an enhanced Nokia Drive package with voice-guided turn-by-turn navigation, and Nokia Transit, which allows navigation through local public transportation. Nokia City Lens offers a hybrid mapping/photography feature that overlays various points of interest in an image, such as businesses. Additional photography-related features are Nokia Cinemagraph, which is "a lens that creates animated GIFs"; panorama settings, and Group Shot. The phone includes a dedicated camera button that allows activating the camera from a sleeping or even locked device. The October 8 announcement included Nokia Music, which can also be used offline.

The Lumia 810 was discontinued in stores in April 2013. As of April 4, 2014, the day Microsoft introduced its Windows Phone 8.1 OS update, T-Mobile US stated that "no updates" for the 810 will be made available. In February 2015, T-Mobile confirmed that Windows Phone 8.1 would not come to devices other than the Lumia 521 and Lumia 925.

Windows Phone 8.1 was not released for the phone, making the Lumia 810 the only Nokia Windows phone to not be updated to Windows Phone 8.1. However, it's possible to install Windows Phone 8.1 on the Lumia 810 through Microsoft's Preview for Developers app.

== See also ==
- Microsoft Lumia
