= Microsoft Lumia 435 =

Windows Mobile Smartphone designed and built by Microsoft Mobile

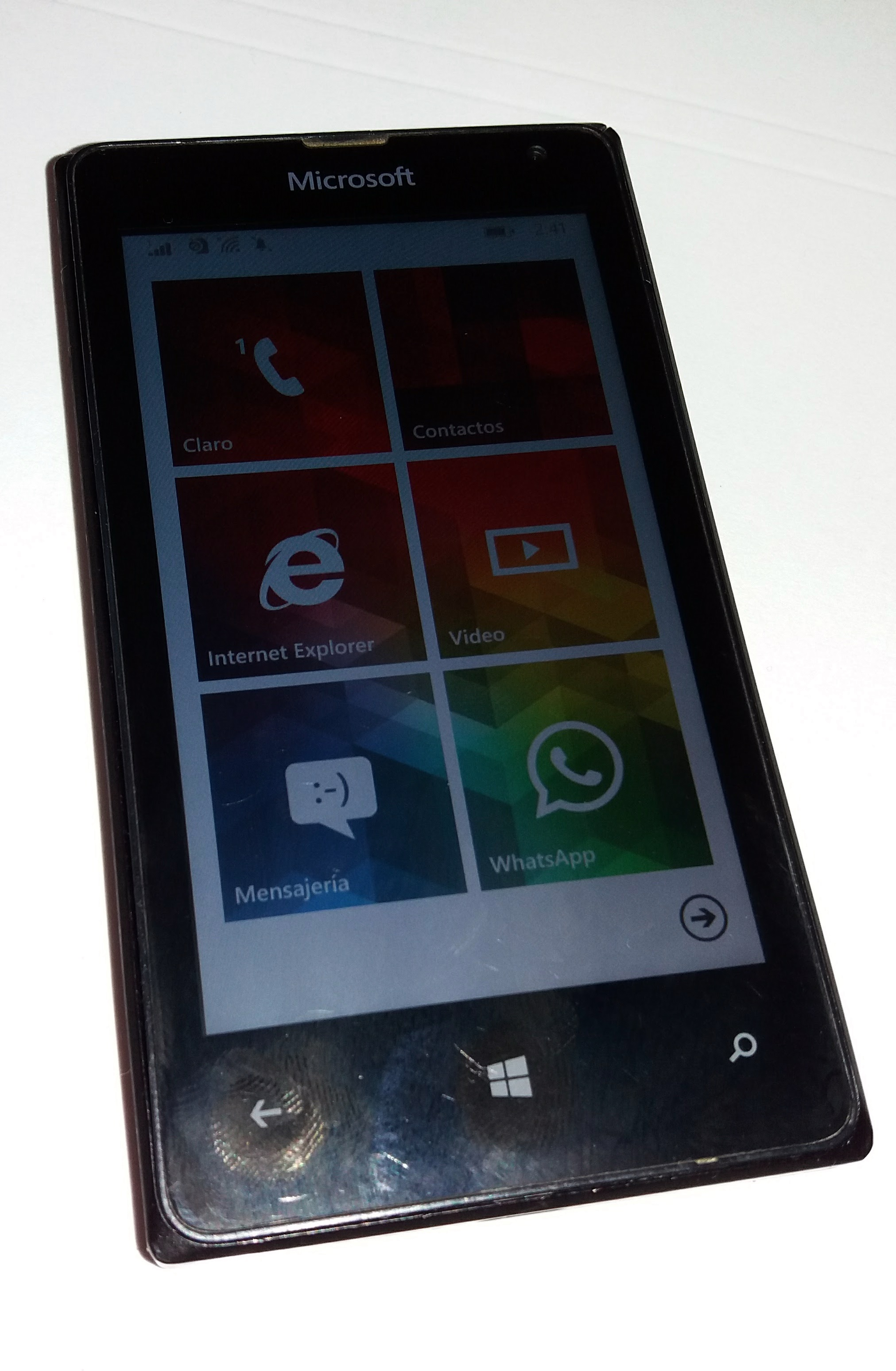
- Microsoft Lumia 435 Dual-SIM model
- Brand: Microsoft
- Manufacturer: Microsoft Mobile Oy (Microsoft)
- Type: Smartphone
- Series: Lumia
- First released: 14 January 2015 SoC=Qualcomm snapdragon 200
- Predecessor: Nokia X family
- Related: Microsoft Lumia 430
- Form factor: Slate
- Operating system: Windows Phone 8.1 (Lumia Denim) Upgradable to Windows 10 Mobile
- CPU: Dual-core 1.2 GHz Cortex-A7
- GPU: Adreno 302
- Memory: 1 GB RAM
- Storage: 8 GB internal
- Battery: 1560 mAh Battery, Maximum talk time (3G): 11.7 hours Maximum standby time: 21 days
- Rear camera: 2 MP
- Front camera: 0.3m VGA
- Display: 4-inch TFT LCD, 480x800 resolution
- Data inputs: Multi-touch capacitive touchscreen
- Website: Microsoft Lumia 435 at the Wayback Machine (archived January 23, 2015)

The Microsoft Lumia 435 is a mobile phone developed by Microsoft for emerging markets. It was introduced in January 2015 to compete with Google's Android One. The phone offers Lumia Denim out of the box and comes pre-installed with Lumia Selfie.

It is available in the US for $50.

== Specifications ==
=== Hardware ===
The Lumia 435 has a 4.0-inch IPS LCD, dual-core 1.2 GHz Cortex-A7 Qualcomm Snapdragon 200 processor, 1 GB of RAM and 8 GB of internal storage that can be expanded using microSD cards up to 256 GB. The phone has a 1560 mAh Li-ion battery, 2-megapixel rear camera and VGA front-facing camera. It is available in black, white, green and orange.

=== Software ===
The Lumia 435 ships with Windows Phone 8.1 and can be updated to Windows 10 Mobile.

== See also ==
- Microsoft Lumia
- Microsoft Lumia 532
