= Microsoft Lumia 540 =

Smartphone model by Microsoft

- Brand: Lumia
- Manufacturer: Microsoft Mobile (Microsoft)
- Type: Smartphone
- Series: Lumia
- First released: April 2015
- Predecessor: Microsoft Lumia 535
- Successor: Microsoft Lumia 550
- Compatible networks: GSM/GPRS/EDGE 850/900/1800/1900; HSPA 900/2100
- Form factor: Slate
- Operating system: Windows Phone 8.1 Update 2 (Lumia Denim)
- System-on-chip: Qualcomm Snapdragon 200
- CPU: 1.2 GHz quad-core Qualcomm Krait
- GPU: Qualcomm Adreno 302
- Memory: 1 GB RAM
- Storage: 8 GB Internal
- Removable storage: 128 GB, microSD
- Battery: 2200 mAh
- Rear camera: 8.0 MP auto-focus, f/2.2 with LED flash, 480p video recording
- Front camera: 5.0 MP
- Display: 5-inch IPS LCD, HD 1280x720 resolution, 294 ppi
- Connectivity: Bluetooth 4.0 (LE); Assisted GPS; GPS/GLONASS; Micro-USB 2.0; Wi-Fi :802.11b/g/n, WiFi Hotspot; Wi-Fi-based positioning system (WPS); FM radio, Internet radio
- Data inputs: Multi-touch capacitive touchscreen
- Website: Microsoft Lumia 540 Dual SIM at the Wayback Machine (archived April 18, 2015)

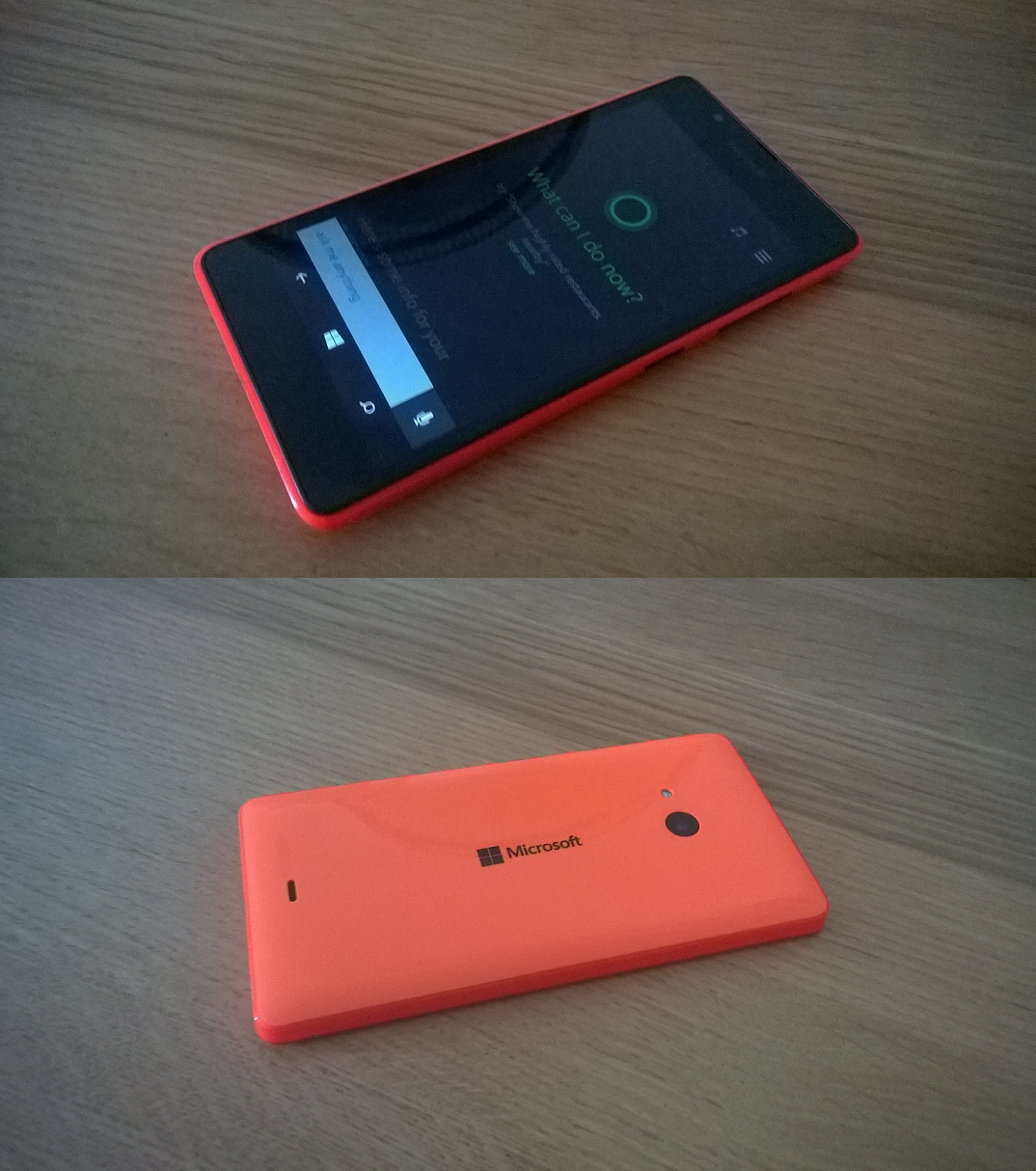
Front and back

The Microsoft Lumia 540 is a low-cost smartphone from the Microsoft Lumia family.

Unlike its predecessor, the Lumia 540 is equipped with a 720p display, but otherwise has internal specifications similar to earlier devices in the Lumia 5xx series. It comes pre-installed with Windows Phone 8.1 Update 2 (with Lumia Denim firmware).

Due to its position as a low-cost device, the Lumia 540 is only available in Italy, India, the Middle East, Africa, and Asia.

== Specifications ==
=== Hardware ===
The Lumia 540 has a 5.0-inch IPS LCD, quad-core 1.2 GHz Cortex-A7 Qualcomm Snapdragon 200 processor, 1 GB of RAM and 8 GB of internal storage that can be expanded using microSD cards up to 256 GB. The phone has a 2200 mAh Li-ion battery, 8 MP rear camera and 5 MP front-facing camera. It is available in orange, white, black, grey and blue.

=== Software ===
The Lumia 540 ships with Windows Phone 8.1 with Lumia Denim update.

== Reception ==
The Microsoft Lumia 540 Dual SIM was well received but was criticized for not offering an upgrade over earlier devices from the Lumia 5xx series.

== See also ==
- Microsoft Lumia
- Microsoft Lumia 535
- Microsoft Lumia 550
- Microsoft Lumia 640
