= Nokia Lumia 928 =

Smartphone model

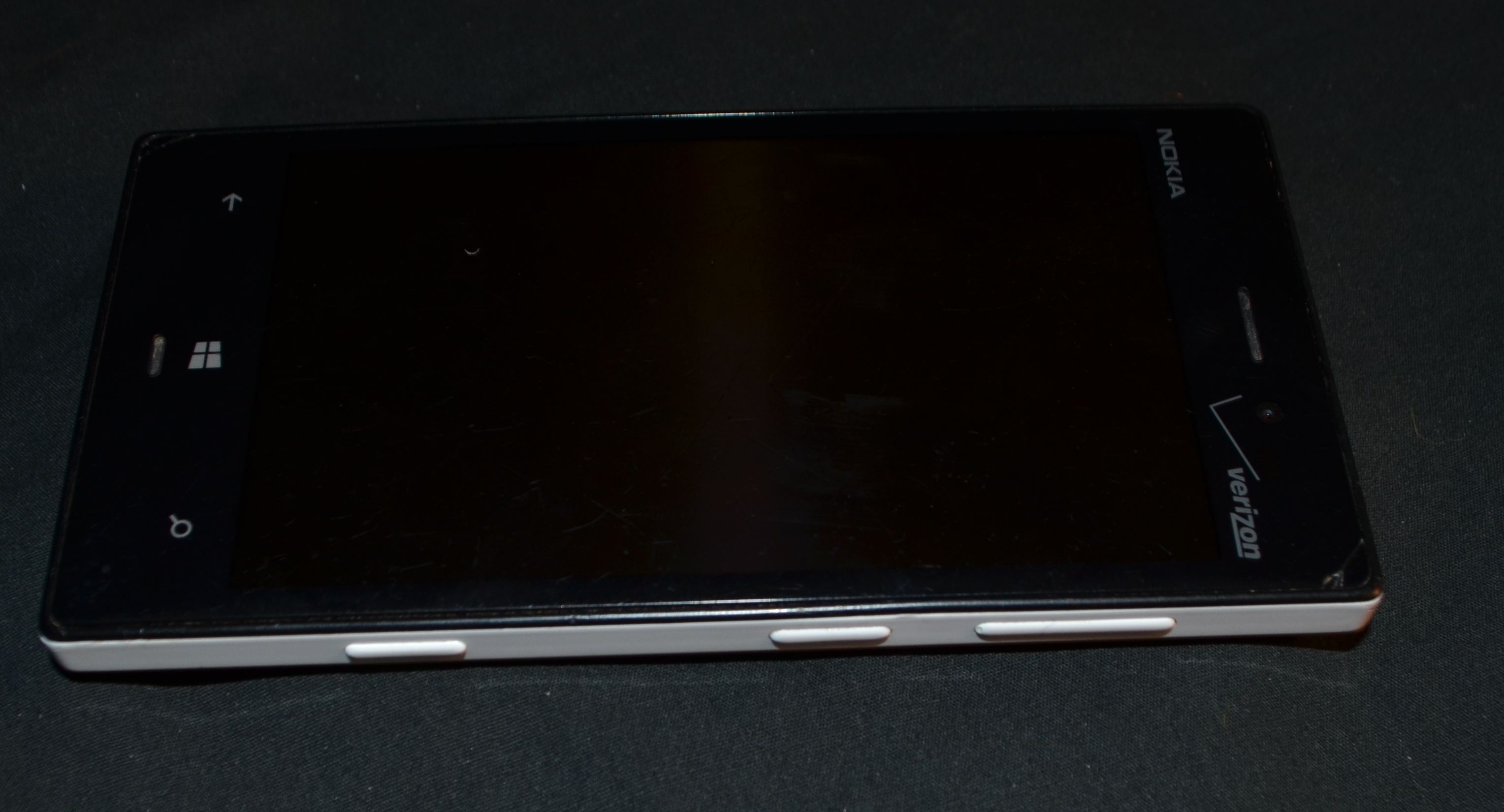
- Manufacturer: Nokia
- Type: Touchscreen smartphone
- Series: Lumia
- First released: Thursday, May 16, 2013
- Predecessor: Nokia Lumia 920
- Successor: Nokia Lumia 930
- Related: Nokia Lumia 920, Nokia Lumia 925, Nokia Lumia 1020
- Compatible networks: 2.5G GSM/GPRS/EDGE – 850, 900, 1800, 1900 MHz 2.5G CDMA 1xRTT/1x-Advanced - 800, 1900 MHz; 3G UMTS/DC-HSPA+ – 850, 900, 1900, 2100 MHz; 3G CDMA Ev-DO Rev. A - 800, 1900 MHz 4G LTE Rel. 8 (UE Cat 3) – 700, 800, 900, 1800, 2100, 2600 MHz
- Form factor: Bar
- Dimensions: 133 mm (5.2 in) H 68.9 mm (2.71 in) W 10.1 mm (0.40 in) D
- Weight: 162 g (5.7 oz)
- Operating system: Windows Phone 8
- CPU: 1.5 GHz dual-core Qualcomm MSM8960+WTR
- GPU: Qualcomm Adreno 225
- Memory: 1 GB RAM
- Storage: 32 GB internal flash and 7 GB free in SkyDrive
- Battery: Integrated 2000 mAh Li-poly battery with Qi wireless charging
- Rear camera: 8.7 MP PureView with Carl Zeiss Tessar lens and Xenon flash, Wide angle, f/2.0, 26 mm True 16:9 optics, 1.4 μm sensor, optical image stabilization (OIS), 1080p video capture @ 30 fps with LED for video
- Front camera: 1.2 MP wide angle, f/2.4, 720p video capture @ 30fps
- Display: 4.5 in (110 mm) WXGA HD AMOLED, 1280 x 768 pixels at 334 ppi, 15:9 aspect ratio, Color depth 24 bit, 16M colors, 60 Hz refresh rate, ClearBlack display, Sunlight Readability Enhancement (SRE), High Brightness Mode (HBM), Super-sensitive capacitive touch enables interacting with the display with gloves and long fingernails, 2.5D Corning Gorilla Glass 2
- Connectivity: List: Wi-Fi :802.11 a/b/g/n; Wi-Fi-based positioning system (WPS); GPS/GLONASS; SA-GPS NFC; Bluetooth 3.0; Micro-USB 2.0
- Data inputs: Multi-touch capacitive touchscreen, Gyroscope, Magnetometer, proximity sensor, 3D-Accelerometer
- Other: Talk time: Up to 13 hours Standby time: Up to 606 hours (approx. 25.2 days)
- Website: Nokia Lumia 928

The Nokia Lumia 928 is a high-end smartphone developed by Nokia that runs Microsoft's Windows Phone 8 operating system. It was announced on May 10, 2013, as a Verizon-exclusive variant of the Nokia Lumia 920. It became available on May 16, 2013, on a two-year contract for $99.99 in the United States. It is exclusive to the U.S. and Canadian markets.

== Key features ==
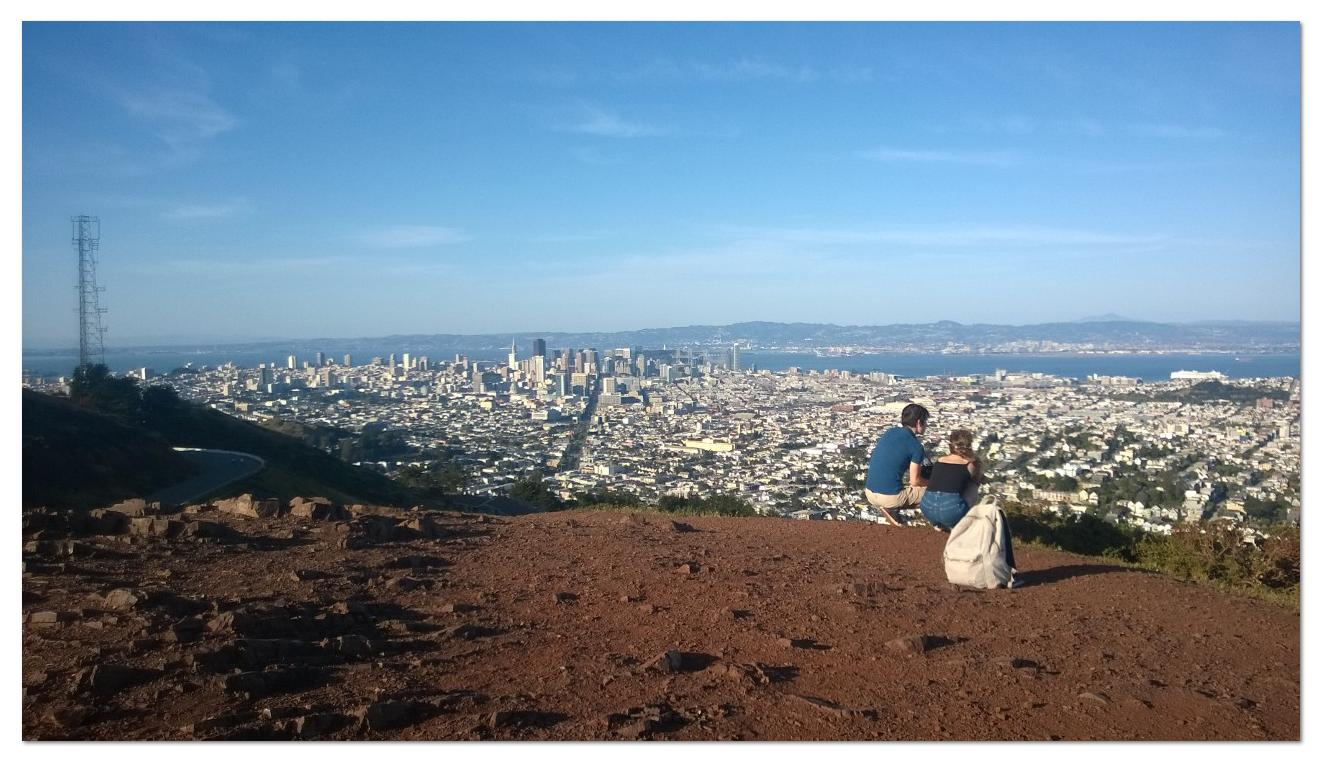
A landscape taken with a 928

The main features of the Nokia Lumia include:

- 4.5 in (110 mm) 1280 x 768 AMOLED 334 PPI touchscreen display
- 8.7 MP PureView camera with Carl Zeiss optics and Xenon Flash
- Optical image stabilization
- 1080p HD video and photo recording

== Availability ==
The phone was released for sale exclusively through Verizon in the United States for $99 with a 2-year contract or $500 with no contract. In other countries, the aluminum-made Nokia Lumia 925 is offered instead of 928, although the 925 is also available on T-Mobile US.

== Reception ==
Armando Rodriguez from PC World wrote: "The Nokia Lumia 928 is excellent for capturing images in low-light environments, but the phone falls victim to Windows Phone's various shortcomings."

Alex Colon from PCMag wrote: "For $100, the Nokia Lumia 928 is a lot of phone, both literal and figurative. I do wish it were smaller still, like the just-announced Lumia 925, but you're getting plenty of bang for your buck here. The biggest question is how much you care about apps. The Lumia 928 is competitive in many ways with some of the best smartphones available, but it just can't keep up when it comes to apps."

== See also ==
- Microsoft Lumia
