= Microsoft Lumia 640 =

Windows Phone smartphone

Microsoft Lumia 640/640 XL/LTE
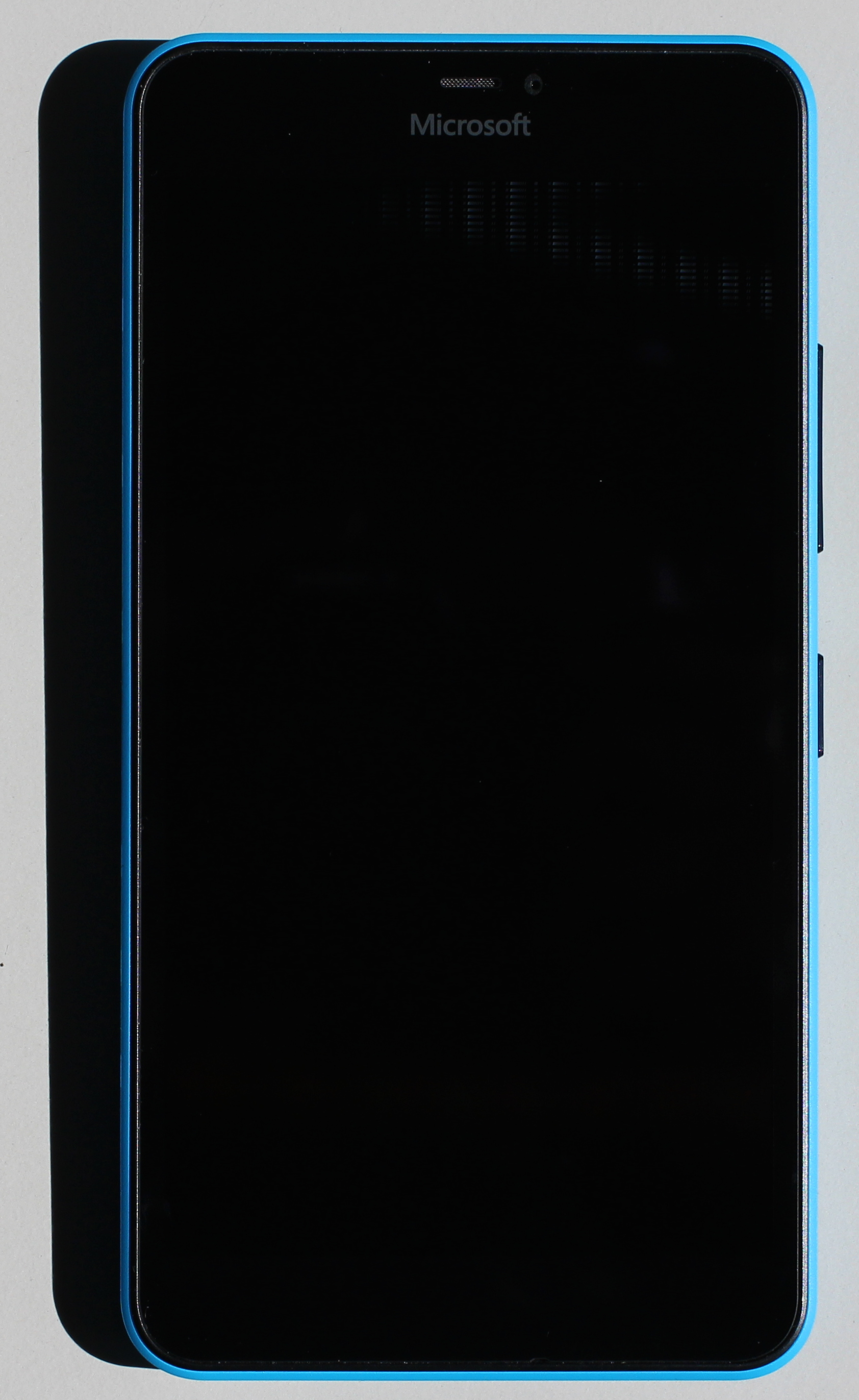
- Microsoft Lumia 640 XL
- Brand: Microsoft
- Manufacturer: Microsoft Mobile (Microsoft)
- Type: Smartphone; Phablet (Lumia 640 XL)
- Series: Lumia
- First released: March 2, 2015
- Predecessor: Nokia Lumia 630; Nokia Lumia 1320
- Successor: Microsoft Lumia 650
- Related: Microsoft Lumia 430
- Compatible networks: GSM/GPRS/EDGE 850/900/1800/1900; HSPA 900/2100 (+ 850/1900 for RM-1018/RM-1020)
- Form factor: Slate
- Dimensions: 141.3 mm (5.56 in) H 72.2 mm (2.84 in) W 8.8 mm (0.35 in) D
- Weight: 145 g (5.1 oz)
- Operating system: Windows Phone 8.1 Update 2 (Lumia Denim) upgradable to Windows 10 Mobile
- System-on-chip: Qualcomm Snapdragon 400 MSM8226/MSM8926
- CPU: 1.2 GHz quad-core ARM Cortex-A7
- GPU: Qualcomm Adreno 305
- Memory: 1 GB RAM
- Storage: 8 GB (only 3 GB available)
- Removable storage: 128 GB microSD
- Battery: 2500 mAh Li-ion (Lumia 640); 3000 mAh Li-ion (Lumia 640 XL)
- Rear camera: 8.0 MP auto-focus, f/2.2 with LED flash, FHD 1920x1080 video (Lumia 640); 13.0 MP, BSI, auto-focus, 10 cm minimum focus range, f/2.0, 28 mm focal length with LED flash, FHD 1920x1080 video (Lumia 640 XL Only)
- Front camera: 0.9 MP, 720p video (Lumia 640); 5.0 MP, 1080p video (Lumia 640 XL Only)
- Display: 5-inch 720p HD IPS LCD, 294 ppi (Lumia 640); 5.7-inch 720p IPS LCD, 258 ppi (Lumia 640 XL); Corning Gorilla Glass 3
- Connectivity: Bluetooth 4.0 (LE); Assisted GPS; GPS/GLONASS/BeiDou; Micro-USB 2.0; Wi-Fi: 802.11b/g/n, WiFi Hotspot; WPS; FM radio
- Data inputs: Multi-touch capacitive touchscreen
- Website: Microsoft Lumia 640 Dual SIM; Microsoft Lumia 640 XL LTE Dual SIM; Microsoft Lumia 640 LTE; Microsoft Lumia 640 LTE Dual SIM; Microsoft Lumia 640 XL Dual SIM; Microsoft Lumia 640 XL; Microsoft Lumia 640 XL LTE

The Microsoft Lumia 640 and Microsoft Lumia 640 XL are Windows Phone smartphones developed by Microsoft Mobile. Both phones were announced on March 2, 2015, and are the successors to the Nokia Lumia 630 series and the Lumia 1320, respectively. The phones are primarily aimed at developing markets, although they are also available in developed markets as lower-cost options compared to other phones in their classes. The two devices became available in the US and most other markets in June 2015.

On February 15, 2016, Microsoft announced the Lumia 650, the Lumia 640 successor, with improvements like device encryption, an AMOLED display, and 16 GB of flash storage.

On October 18, 2017, Microsoft confirmed that the phone will not receive more major Windows updates, but it will still get security updates and cumulative updates until 2020.

== Release and availability ==
The Lumia 640 and 640 XL were unveiled at Microsoft's event at the Mobile World Congress in Barcelona, Spain on March 2, 2015.

The Lumia 640 LTE has U.S. pricing beginning at US$ 179.99, while the Lumia 640 XL LTE (exclusive to AT&T in the country) is priced at US$ 249.99.

Both phones are available as Dual-SIM and LTE worldwide from April 2015.

In certain countries, there is promotion which includes a 16 GB or 32 GB SD memory card for purchasing Lumia 640 and 640 XL.

== Hardware ==
Despite similar names and model codes, the Microsoft Lumia 640 and Microsoft Lumia 640 XL are distinct devices in both form and function.

The Lumia 640 comes with a 5-inch HD IPS LCD with Corning Gorilla Glass 3 protection and oleophobic (fingerprint-resistant) coating. It is powered by a 1.2 GHz quad-core Qualcomm Snapdragon 400 processor, 1 GB RAM and 8 GB (only 3 GB available) internal storage with up to 128GB expandable storage via microSD cards. It has a 2500 mAh Li-Ion battery, 8 MP rear camera with LED flash, and 0.9 MP wide-angle front-facing camera. It is available in glossy cyan, orange, and white, along with matte-texture black.

The Microsoft Lumia 640 XL is the larger, "phablet"-type version of the Lumia 640, with a 5.7-inch HD IPS LCD. The 640 XL is equipped with the same basic hardware and network connectivity specifications as the Lumia 640, but features a Zeiss-engineered 13 MP (1/3.0″ sensor) rear camera with LED flash, as well as a 5MP wide-angle front-facing camera. It has a 3000 mAh Li-Ion battery and is available in matte-texture cyan, orange, and black, along with glossy & matte-texture white.

== Software ==
The Lumia 640 and Lumia 640 XL shipped with Windows Phone 8.1 Update 2 (through the Lumia Denim software package), and both phones are upgradable to Windows 10 Mobile. Initially in the United States, the Lumia 640 and 640 XL were offered with a free one-year subscription to Microsoft Office 365.

== Carriers ==
Australia

- Telstra (Lumia 640 and 640 XL)

United StatesRM-

- AT&T (Lumia 640 and 640 XL)
- Cricket Wireless (Lumia 640 only)
- MetroPCS (Lumia 640 only)
- T-Mobile (Lumia 640 only)

== Models ==
Lumia 640 models

	RM-1072	RM-1073	RM-1074	RM-1075	RM-1076	RM-1077	RM-1113
Bands supported							
SIM Support	Single SIM LTE	Single SIM LTE	Single SIM LTE	Dual SIM LTE	Single SIM 3G	Dual SIM 3G	Dual SIM LTE
Region	Europe	United States	Global	Global			

Lumia 640XL models

	RM-1062	RM-1063	RM-1064	RM-1065	RM-1066	RM-1067	RM-1096
Bands Supported							
SIM Support	Single SIM LTE	Single SIM LTE	Single SIM LTE	Dual SIM LTE	Single SIM 3G	Dual SIM 3G	Dual SIM LTE
Region	Europe	United States	Global	Global	Europe	Europe	HK & China

== See also ==
- Microsoft Lumia
- Nokia Lumia 630
- Nokia Lumia 1320
- Microsoft Lumia 650
