= Nokia Lumia 730 =

Smartphone model

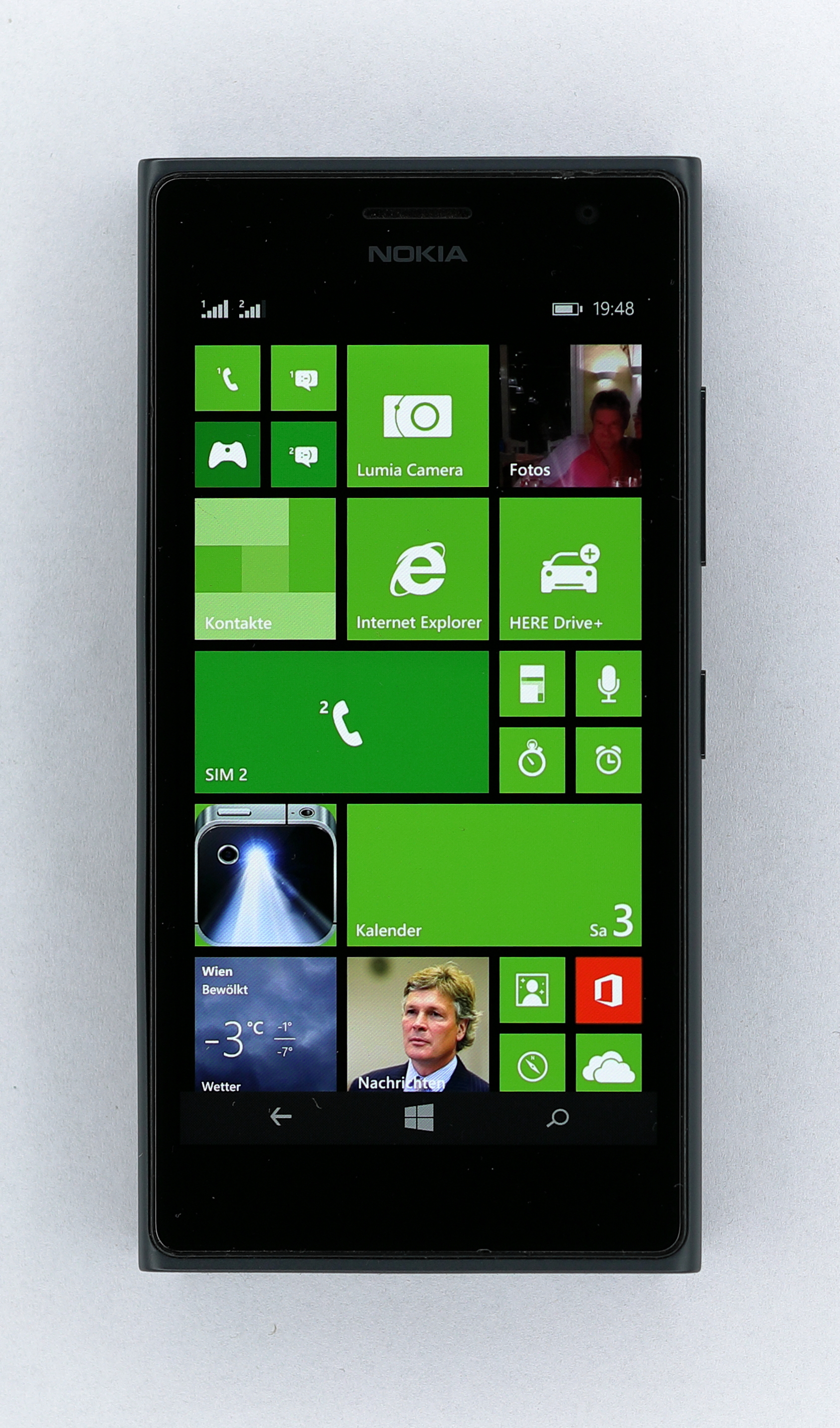
Lumia 730 with customized Windows Phone 8.1 Start Screen

The Nokia Lumia 730 is a smartphone developed by Nokia and released by Microsoft Mobile that initially runs Microsoft's Windows Phone 8.1 operating system. It was announced on September 4, 2014, at Internationale Funkausstellung Berlin, just a few months after Microsoft bought Nokia's mobile division and renamed it Microsoft Mobile. It was released in October 2014. It is a successor to the 2013 Nokia Lumia 720 and marketed as a selfie phone.

== Display ==
The phone has a 4.7-inch OLED capacitive touchscreen with a 66.0% screen-to-body ratio and a resolution of 720x1280 pixels (~316 ppi pixel density). The display features Nokia's ClearBlack polarisation filters and is protected by curved Gorilla Glass 3.

== Operating Software ==
The Lumia 730 ships with Microsoft's Windows Phone 8.1 operating system coupled with the Lumia Denim firmware update. It is upgradable to Windows 10 Mobile.

== Platform ==
The Lumia 730 has a Qualcomm Snapdragon 400 MSM8926 SoC with a 1.2 GHz quad-core ARM Cortex-A7 CPU and a Qualcomm Adreno 305 GPU. There is 1 GB of RAM and 8 GB of internal storage; the latter can be expanded with MicroSD cards up to 128 GB in size.

== Camera ==
The Lumia 730 has a 6.7 MP PureView-branded rear camera, sporting a 1/3.4-inch BSI sensor with 1.12 μm pixels and an Carl Zeiss 6-element lens with an f/1.9 aperture. The camera supports 1080p video capture and is complemented by an LED flash. The front camera has a 5 MP sensor with a wide-angle f/2.4 lens and supports 1080p video recording.

Many users reported that after upgrading to Windows 10, the front camera stopped being able to properly focus at normal distances, only focusing properly at very near distances. The problem was not fixed if one downgraded the unit back to Windows Phone 8.1. Newer builds did not solve the problem either once it appeared.

== Connectivity ==
Wireless connectivity options include dual-band Wi-Fi 802.11a/b/g/n, Wi-Fi hotspot, NFC, Bluetooth 4.0 and wireless screen projection via Miracast. Physical connectors include a Micro-USB 2.0 connector for charging and data transfer, as well as a 3.5 mm audio jack. The phone supports two SIM cards.

== Other Features ==
The Lumia 730 includes a variety of sensors, including proximity sensor, ambient light sensor, magnetometer, gyroscope and accelerometer, as well as Microsoft's Motion Data activity tracker based on Qualcomm's SensorCore technology. Due to chipset limitations, however, it does not support passive voice activation for the Cortana digital assistant.

== See also ==
- Microsoft Lumia
- Nokia Lumia 735
- Cortana
- Windows 10 Mobile
- UWP apps
