= Nokia Lumia 822 =

Smartphone model

- Manufacturer: Nokia
- Type: Smartphone
- Series: Lumia
- First released: 15 November 2012
- Predecessor: Nokia Lumia 800
- Successor: Nokia Lumia 830
- Related: Nokia Lumia 810, Nokia Lumia 820
- Compatible networks: CDMA2000 1xEV-DO; GSM/GPRS/EDGE 850/900/1800/1900; HSPA 850/900/1900/2100; LTE Band 13 (700)
- Form factor: Bar
- Dimensions: 127.8 mm (5.03 in) H 68.4 mm (2.69 in) W 11.2 mm (0.44 in) D
- Weight: 142 g (5.0 oz)
- Operating system: Windows Phone 8
- System-on-chip: Qualcomm Snapdragon S4 MSM8960
- CPU: 1.5 GHz dual-core Qualcomm Krait
- GPU: Qualcomm Adreno 225
- Memory: 1 GB RAM
- Storage: 16 GB internal flash
- Removable storage: microSD, up to 64 GB
- Battery: Rechargeable BP-4W 1800mAh Li-ion battery, Qi inductive charging
- Rear camera: 8.0-megapixel, 3264 x 2448 pixels, f/2.2, Short Pulse High Power Dual-LED flash, autofocus, Carl Zeiss optics, 1080p video capture
- Front camera: 1.3-megapixel, 1280 x 960 pixels, 720p video capture
- Display: 4.3" AMOLED ClearBlack capacitive touchscreen, 800 x 480 pixels at 216.97 ppi, 16.7m-color, RGB Stripe, Gorilla Glass 2
- Connectivity: Bluetooth 3.0, Wi-Fi 802.11a/b/g/n, NFC, microUSB v2.0, USB On-The-Go GPS with A-GPS & GLONASS
- Data inputs: Multi-touch capacitive touchscreen, proximity sensor, ambient light sensor, Gyroscope, Magnetometer, 3-axis accelerometer
- Other: Talk time: Up to 10.2 hours Standby time: Up to 486 hours (approx. 20.3 days)
- Website: Nokia Lumia 822

The Nokia Lumia 822 is a smartphone running Windows Phone 8 announced on 29 October 2012. It is exclusively available for Verizon customers. The device is a variant of Nokia Lumia 820. The Lumia 822 supports Qi standard induction charging and LTE connectivity.

== History ==
=== Release ===
During the Windows Phone 8 announcement on 29 October 2012, Steve Ballmer announced the release of the Lumia 822 alongside various other Windows Phone 8 smartphones, such as the HTC 8X and the Nokia Lumia 920. It is considered to be a carrier based variant of the Nokia Lumia 820, with some specific carrier variants, such as the support for LTE networks. The Nokia Lumia 822 was actually released for sale on 15 November 2012.

On 18 February 2014, the Nokia Lumia 822 received the 'Black' firmware update (revision number 3051.40000.1352.0042), and it receive the 'DENIM' firmware update that introduces Windows 8.1.

== Hardware ==
Unlike the Lumia 920 and 820, the Lumia 822 has a different body design and shape. It comes in four different colors: Black, White, Gray, and Red (which launched on 24 January to commemorate Valentine's Day).

=== Processors, storage and memory ===
The Lumia 822 features a Qualcomm Snapdragon S4 dual-core processor, clocked at 1.5 GHz, with 1 GB of onboard RAM.

There is 16 GB of internal storage, which is also expandable by MicroSD, up to 64 GB.

=== Screen ===
The Lumia 822 features a Gorilla Glass 2-covered, 4.3-inch display at a WVGA (800×480) resolution. The screen utilises AMOLED display technologies, featuring Nokia's ClearBlack display technology. This adds a polarizing filter in the display to remove reflection of light from the screen to make blacks darker and deeper, improving contrast.

=== Camera ===
Similar to the Lumia 820, the rear-facing camera features an 8-megapixel sensor with a f/2.2 Carl Zeiss Tessar lens. The rear-facing camera is also capable of shooting 1080p full HD video at 30fps. The front-facing camera has a resolution of 1.2 megapixels, allowing for videos at 720p.

=== Connectivity ===
The Lumia 822 supports all of Verizon's CDMA and LTE bands. It also supports various GSM bands for world roaming purposes. It supports NFC, allowing for transfer of small files between phones. Other connectivity includes; Wi-Fi 802.11a/b/g/n, Bluetooth 4.0 and Micro USB.

=== Inductive charging ===
Like its sibling phones, the Lumia 820 and 920, the 822 supports inductive charging through Qi technology. With this, it allows the phone to be placed on either a charging pillow or plate and be charged.

== Reception ==
Jessica Dolcourt from CNET wrote: "The Nokia Lumia 822 offers a very good value for Verizon, but if you're into stylish design and spotless call quality, this isn't the phone for you."

David Eitelbach from Laptopmag wrote: "The Lumia 822 makes a good first impression, but unfortunately the good vibes don't last as long as we'd like."

== See also ==
- Microsoft Lumia
