= Nokia Lumia 625 =

Windows Phone by Nokia

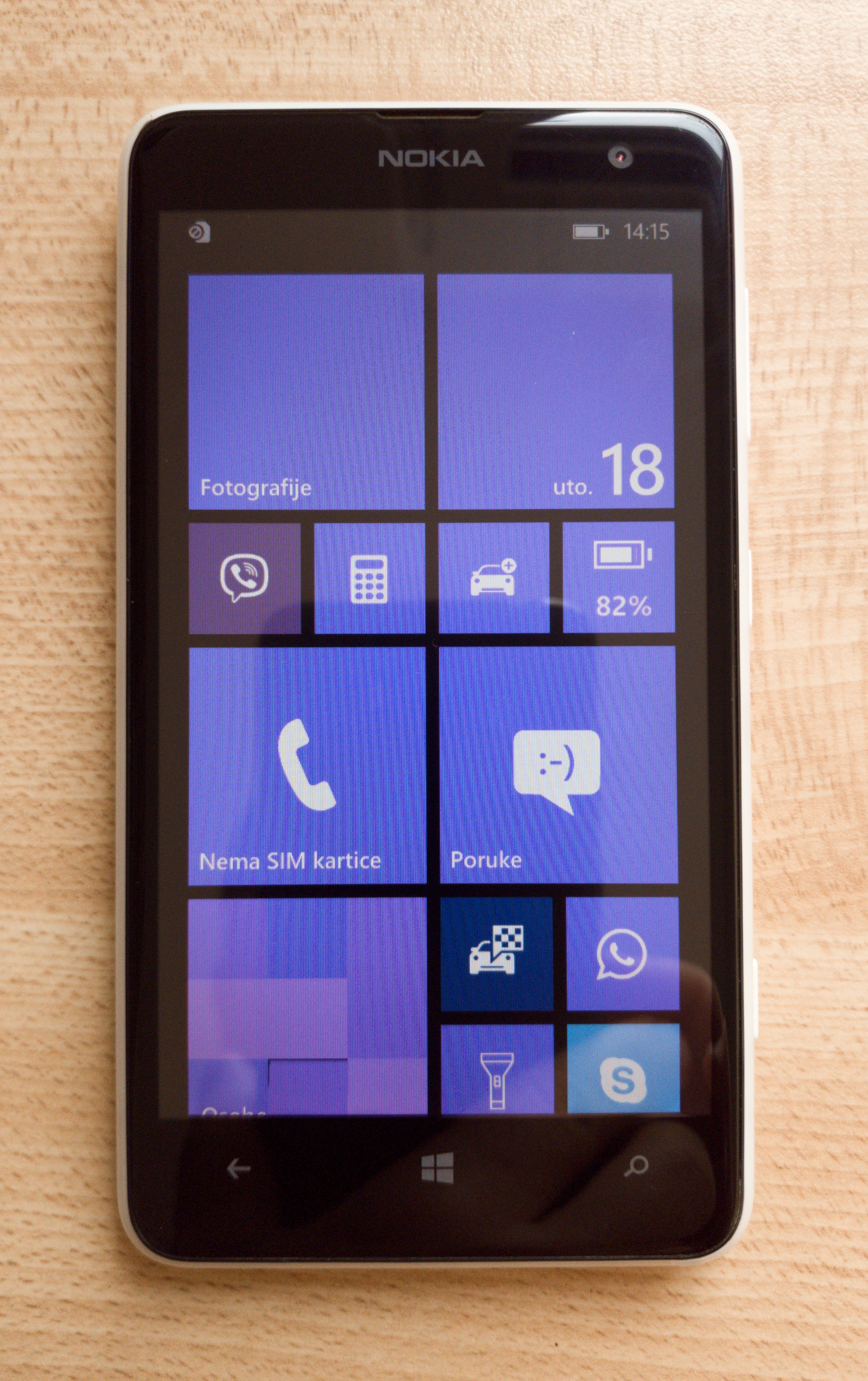
- Manufacturer: Nokia
- Type: Smartphone
- Series: Lumia
- First released: July 23, 2013
- Availability by region: August 2013
- Discontinued: April 2015
- Predecessor: Nokia Lumia 620
- Successor: Nokia Lumia 630/635
- Related: Nokia Lumia 1320
- Compatible networks: GSM/GPRS/EDGE; HSPA+ LTE; Wi-Fi
- Form factor: Touchscreen Slate
- Dimensions: 133.25 mm (5.246 in) H 72.25 mm (2.844 in) W 9.15 mm (0.360 in) D
- Weight: 159 g (5.6 oz)
- Operating system: Windows Phone 8
- System-on-chip: Qualcomm Snapdragon S4 MSM8930
- CPU: 1.2 GHz dual-core Krait 200
- GPU: Qualcomm Adreno 305
- Memory: 512 MB RAM
- Storage: 8 GB internal flash
- Battery: BP-4GWA 2000 mAh
- Rear camera: 5 MP, 1080p Full HD video capture at 30 fps, autofocus, Touch to focus, image stabilization, Exposure compensation, Digital zoom, Geotagging, LED flash
- Front camera: 0.3 MP, VGA video capture
- Display: 4.7" IPS LCD with Gorilla Glass 3, 800x480 px at 201 ppi, 15:9 aspect ratio
- Connectivity: List: Wi-Fi :802.11 b/g/n; Wi-Fi-based positioning system (WPS); GPS/GLONASS; SA-GPS; Bluetooth 4.0; Micro-USB 2.0
- Data inputs: Multi-touch capacitive touchscreen, Gyroscope, Magnetometer, proximity sensor, 3D-Accelerometer
- Other: Talk time: 2G: 23.9 hours 3G: 15.2 hours Standby: 552 hours (23 days)
- Website: Nokia Lumia 625

The Nokia Lumia 625 is a Windows Phone with a 4.7-inch IPS LCD WVGA (480x800) screen and 4G support. It was presented on July 23, 2013. It can be loaded up with the latest software update for Windows Phone 8.1, as well as Nokia's firmware update 'Denim' (excluding some features). It borrows features from the Nokia Lumia 1520, the Lumia 1020 and the Lumia 925.

== Release ==
It is set to cost €220 or £200 in Europe. $300–$350 CAD It was released in China, Europe, Asia Pacific, India, Middle East, Africa and Latin America initially, starting September.

== Specifications/features ==
It features:

- Support for up to 128 GB external memory via microSD card
- Choice of colors - black, white plus translucent shades of orange, green, yellow
- Signature Camera Apps - Smart Cam, Cinemagraph and Panorama
- FM Radio

It has one of the lowest pixel densities seen in recent smartphones, as it uses the standard Windows Phone 8 resolution (800×480) but on a large display, so the screen will not appear super-sharp.

The 512 MB RAM according to some reviewers prevents one from playing high-end games and sometimes mar the multi-tasking experience for power users.

== See also ==
- Microsoft Lumia
