= Nokia Lumia 820 =

2012 Nokia smartphone

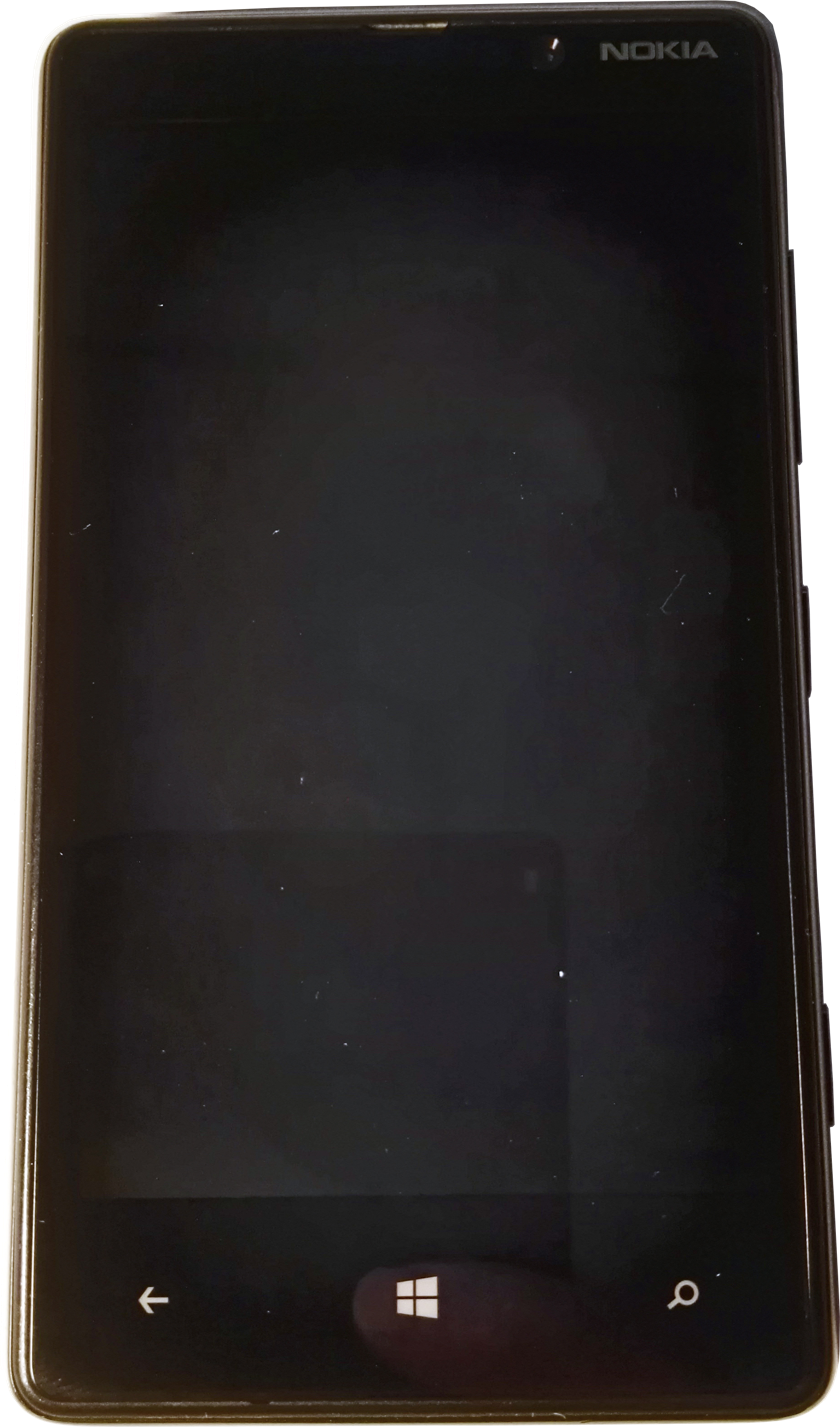
- Brand: Nokia
- Manufacturer: Nokia
- Type: Smartphone
- Series: Nokia Lumia
- First released: November 7, 2012
- Discontinued: 2014
- Predecessor: Nokia Lumia 800
- Successor: Nokia Lumia 830
- Related: Nokia Lumia 810, Nokia Lumia 822, Nokia Lumia 920
- Compatible networks: GSM/GPRS/EDGE 850/900/1800/1900; HSPA 850/900/1900/2100; LTE 800/900/1800/2100/2600; Wi-Fi
- Form factor: Slate
- Dimensions: 123.8 mm (4.87 in) H 68.5 mm (2.70 in) W 9.9 mm (0.39 in) D
- Weight: 160 g (5.6 oz)
- Operating system: Windows Phone 8, upgradeable to 8.1
- System-on-chip: Qualcomm Snapdragon S4 MSM8960
- CPU: 1.5 GHz dual-core Qualcomm Krait
- GPU: Qualcomm Adreno 225
- Memory: 8 GB internal flash 1 GB RAM
- Removable storage: MicroSD (up to 64 GB)
- Battery: Removable & rechargeable BP-5T 1650 mAh Lithium polymer battery, Qi wireless charging (with optional charging shell)
- Rear camera: 8-megapixel, 3264×2448 pixels, Power Dual-LED flash, autofocus Carl Zeiss optics, 1080p video capture
- Front camera: VGA, 640×480 pixels
- Display: 4.3" AMOLED ClearBlack capacitive touchscreen with Super Sensitive Touch; 800×480 px 16.7m-color
- Connectivity: Bluetooth 3.1 (Bluetooth 4.0 certified but not yet supported by WP8,); 802.11a/b/g/n, NFC
- Data inputs: Multi-touch capacitive touchscreen, proximity sensor, ambient light sensor, Gyroscope, Magnetometer, 3-axis accelerometer
- Website: Microsoft Lumia

The Nokia Lumia 820 is a smartphone designed, developed and marketed by Nokia. It is the successor to the Lumia 800 and is one of the first Nokia phones to implement Windows Phone 8 alongside the Nokia Lumia 920. Although sharing a similar appearance with the Lumia 800, the Lumia 820 is a major overhaul over its predecessor, sporting a 4.3 inches (110 mm) diagonal OLED display with scratch resistant glass, though lacking Gorilla Glass protection, 1.5 GHz dual-core processor, and an 8.7-megapixel camera. The phone will come with LTE connectivity and a wireless-charging option. The 820 is the first Nokia Windows Phone OS based smartphone to embed a microSD card slot. A range of interchangeable back shells were released for it, which allow the back shell of the phone to be easily swapped and customized, along with providing features such as wireless charging if a compatible shell is used.

On October 9, 2012, the largely similar Nokia Lumia 810 was presented. The main differences are more talk time (10.2 hours) due to the larger 1800 mAh battery, an improved 1.3-megapixel front-facing camera, lighter weight, wider and longer dimensions. The Lumia 810 is exclusively made available to T-Mobile customers in the United States, and as such does not support LTE but only HSPA+, as LTE was not supported in T-Mobile's US network at the time of release.

On October 29, 2012, another variant of the Lumia 820, the Nokia Lumia 822 was announced, having a better front camera, larger battery and double the storage. It is exclusively available for Verizon customers.

== Reception ==
Jeff Parsons from Techradar wrote: "The Nokia Lumia 820 sits nicely at the crossroads between value and power. While it doesn't have the processor, camera or larger screen of its big brother the Lumia 920, it does have microSD storage, removable covers and a more attractive price tag."

Mike Jennings from PC Pro wrote: "The low-resolution screen, weaker camera and continued lack of apps mean it can’t compete with the best Android handsets, but the usability of Windows 8 and attractive physical design mean this well-balanced Nokia is still an attractive proposition."

Stuart Miles from Pocket-Lint.com wrote: "This is the phone Nokia should be putting all its efforts into promoting. Agreed it isn’t the flagship and agreed the camera isn't nearly anywhere as good as on the 920, but this is a phone you'll be happy to use, a phone you'll enjoy using, and besides a lack of third-party apps at the moment, a phone that for many people will be a fantastic phone they will enjoy for the next two years."

== Model variants ==
Model	RM-824	RM-825	RM-826
Countries	Mexico, United States	International	China, India
Carriers/Providers	Telcel, AT&T	International	
2G	Quad band GSM/EDGE (850/900/1800/1900 MHz)		
3G	Quad-Band HSPA+ 1, 2, 5/6, 8 (850/900/1900/2100 MHz)		Penta-band HSPA+ 1, 2, 4, 5/6, 8 (850/900/AWS/1900/2100 MHz)
4G	Dual-Band LTE 4 and 17 (1700/700 MHz)	Penta-band LTE 1, 3, 7, 8, 20 (2100/1800/2600/900/800 MHz)	yes
Max network speed	LTE: 100 Mbit/s		

== See also ==
- Microsoft Lumia
