= Microsoft Lumia 550 =

Smartphone model by Microsoft

- Brand: Microsoft
- Manufacturer: Microsoft Mobile
- Series: Lumia
- Predecessor: Microsoft Lumia 540
- Successor: Nokia 3
- Related: Microsoft Lumia 950
- Compatible networks: EDGE, HSPA+, LTE
- Dimensions: 136.1 mm (5.36 in) H 67.8 mm (2.67 in) W 9.9 mm (0.39 in) D
- Weight: 141.9 g (5.01 oz)
- Operating system: Windows 10 Mobile
- System-on-chip: Qualcomm Snapdragon 210 MSM8909
- CPU: 1.1 GHz quad-core ARM Cortex-A7
- GPU: Qualcomm Adreno 304
- Memory: 1 GB RAM
- Storage: 8 GB
- Removable storage: microSD up to 200 GB
- Battery: User-removable 2100 mAh Li-ion
- Rear camera: 5 MP; 1/4-inch sensor 720p video at 30 fps LED flash ƒ/2.4 aperture
- Front camera: 2 MP; 480P video, ƒ/2.8 aperture
- Display: 4.7 in (120 mm) LCD, 1280 × 720 pixels at 315 ppi
- Data inputs: Multi-touch capacitive touchscreen
- Codename: Saimaa
- Website: Microsoft Lumia 550 at the Wayback Machine (archived 18 October 2015)

Microsoft Lumia 550 is a budget smartphone manufactured by Microsoft Mobile as part of its Lumia family of Windows-based mobile computing products. It was introduced along with the Lumia 950 and the Lumia 950 XL on 6 October 2015 at a press event held in New York City.

The Lumia 550 was released in December 2015 with Windows 10 Mobile version 1511. Windows 10 Mobile version 1607, Anniversary Update was released in August 2016. Windows 10 Mobile version 1709, Fall Creators Update, was the final software update.

== Specifications ==
=== Hardware ===
The Lumia 550 has a 4.7-inch IPS LCD, quad-core 1.1 GHz Cortex-A7 Qualcomm Snapdragon 210 processor, 1 GB of RAM and 8 GB of internal storage that can be expanded using microSD cards up to 256 GB. The phone has a 2100 mAh Li-ion battery, 5 MP rear camera and 2 MP front-facing camera. It is available in black and white.

=== Software ===
The Lumia 550 ships with Windows 10 Mobile.

== Reception ==
Michael Allison of MSPoweruser criticized the Lumia 550 for having lower specs than its predecessor, such as an inferior 5 MP camera that lacks a wide angle lens, missing functionality and a shorter battery life, making it uncompetitive with similar phones in its price range.

Sean Cameron of Techradar gave the Lumia 550 3 stars out of 5, praising its screen, camera and speakers, but criticizing the battery life and performance and calling the Windows 10 Mobile operating system "unfinished".
