= Nokia Lumia 630 =

Smartphone in the Nokia Lumia series

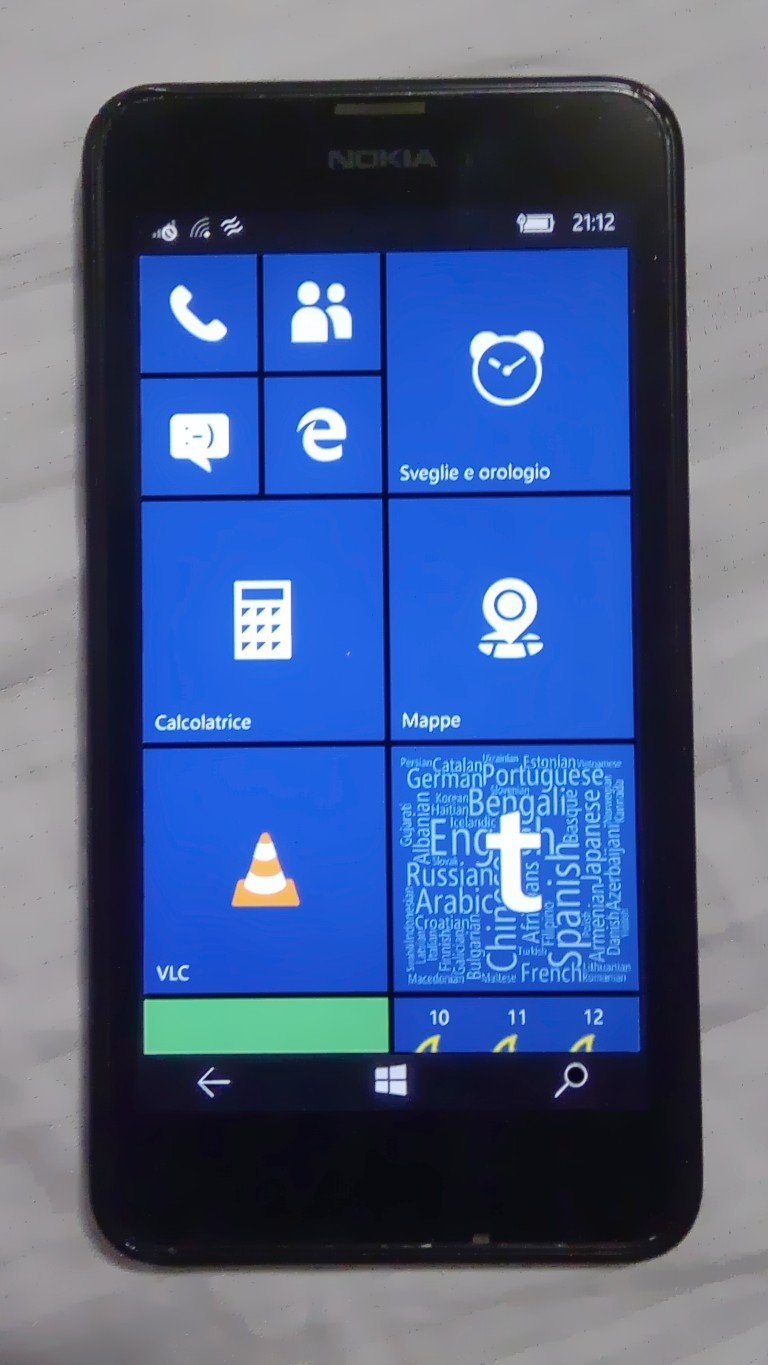
- An example that has been upgraded to Windows 10 Mobile
- Brand: Nokia
- Manufacturer: Microsoft Mobile
- Type: Smartphone
- Series: Lumia
- First released: May 2014
- Availability by region: May 2014
- Discontinued: February 2016
- Predecessor: Nokia Lumia 625
- Successor: Microsoft Lumia 640
- Related: Nokia Lumia 635; Nokia Lumia 636; Nokia Lumia 638; Nokia Lumia 930
- Form factor: Slate
- Weight: 134 g (4.7 oz)
- Operating system: Windows Phone 8.1 (or Windows 10 Mobile for 1GB RAM)
- System-on-chip: Qualcomm Snapdragon 400 MSM8226/MSM8626
- CPU: 1.2 GHz quad-core Cortex-A7
- GPU: Qualcomm Adreno 305
- Memory: 512 MB (630, 635); 1 GB (635, 636, 638)
- Storage: 8 GB
- Removable storage: microSD up to 128 GB
- Battery: 1830 mAh
- Rear camera: 5 MP
- Front camera: None
- Display: 4.5 in (11 cm) ClearBlack FWVGA (854x480 px)
- Other: Talk time: Up to 16.4 hours (2G), 13.1 h (3G); Standby time: up to 15 days Maximum cellular network browsing time: 6.7 h Music playback time: 58 h GPS/A-GPS, GLONASS and BeiDou
- Website: Nokia Lumia 630 and Nokia Lumia 635

The Nokia Lumia 630 is a smartphone developed by Microsoft Mobile that runs Microsoft's Windows Phone 8.1 operating system. It was announced on 2 April 2014, at Microsoft Build 2014 and scheduled to be released in July 2014. It has a Qualcomm Snapdragon 400 SoC with a quad-core processor (MSM8226 or MSM8626) and Adreno 305 GPU. Additionally, it has a 4.5-inch display and a 5 MP camera, as well as an interchangeable shell that comes in bright orange, bright green, bright yellow, matte black, and white. The Lumia 635 is similar but is 4G-compatible, lacks a dual-SIM version, and comes in a different finish, while the Lumia 636 and 638 are identical, but come with 1 GB of RAM (Only 1 GB RAM models can upgrade to Windows 10 Mobile) and are currently available only in China and India respectively.

It is the successor of the Nokia Lumia 625, with an improved quad-core processor, but removes the front-facing camera, flash and dedicated camera button. Since the Nokia Lumia 630/635, all of the non-PureView Lumia phones have removed the camera buttons.

On 2 March 2015, Microsoft presented its successor, the Microsoft Lumia 640, with an improved 1280x720 HD display, 1 GB of RAM, an 8 MP camera with 1080p video recording and LED flash, front-facing camera for selfies and video conferencing, a larger 2500 mAh battery, Office 365, Microsoft Outlook, and Windows 10 Mobile upgradability.

== Availability ==
Nokia launched the Nokia Lumia 630 in India on 12 May 2014, at ₹10,500 along with a dual-SIM variant priced at ₹11,500, both slated to be available from 14 May 2014. In Malaysia it launched at RM549.

In Pakistan, the Lumia 630 was announced with Mobilink on 12 May 2014, at the price of Rs. 15,990/-

As of 29 May 2014, Nokia announced that the Lumia 630 will be available in the United Kingdom at £89.95 for the single SIM version only. The handset was launched by Carphone Warehouse on 22 May 2014, available for purchase on Pay as you go networks and Pay monthly in green, black, white, yellow and orange.

Nokia also launched the Lumia 630 in the Philippines. It was announced in an event was held at the Bonifacio Global City, Taguig on 13 May 2014, and offered at an affordable price of ₱7,990. It will be available in different colours including bright orange, bright yellow, bright green, white and black.

The Lumia 630 launched in November 2014 for the USA market exclusively for Cricket Wireless. It is available in green and blue and is priced at $100.

== Known issues ==
The dual-SIM variant of the device has phone call audio loss issues.

There is a significant area of dimming along the top of the screen.

Some devices do not allow setting Google as default search.

== Variants ==
The Nokia Lumia 636 (RM-1027) and 638 (RM-1010) are 1 GB RAM variants of the Lumia 635 that were only sold in China, Hong Kong and the Philippines for specific carriers. The international version of Lumia 638 was released but only sold in India exclusively through the Microsoft Brand Store at Amazon.in since December 2014 and was the cheapest 4G smartphone in the country.

Lumia 630 TV Edition (RM-979) is a Lumia 630 Dual SIM variant with a built-in ISDB-Tb receiver which is exclusively sold in Brazil.

Video of changing shell of Nokia Lumia 630

== See also ==
- Microsoft Lumia
