= Microsoft Lumia 430 =

Mobile phone developed by Microsoft Mobile, introduced in March 2015

- Brand: Microsoft
- Manufacturer: Microsoft Mobile (Microsoft)
- Type: Smartphone
- Series: Lumia
- First released: March 2015
- Form factor: Slate
- Dimensions: 120.5 mm (4.74 in) H 63.2 mm (2.49 in) W 10.6 mm (0.42 in) D
- Weight: 127.9 g (4.51 oz)
- Operating system: Windows Phone 8.1 Update 1 (Lumia Denim) planned upgrade to Windows 10 Mobile
- System-on-chip: Qualcomm Snapdragon 200 MSM8210
- CPU: 1.2 GHz dual-core Qualcomm Krait
- GPU: Qualcomm Adreno 302
- Memory: 1 GB RAM
- Storage: 8 GB internal
- Removable storage: microSD, up to 128GB
- Battery: 1500 mAh
- Rear camera: 2 MP
- Front camera: 0.3 MP
- Display: 4-inch TFT LCD, 480x800 resolution, 235ppi
- Data inputs: Multi-touch capacitive touchscreen
- Website: Microsoft Lumia 430

The Microsoft Lumia 430 is a mobile phone developed by Microsoft Mobile Oy for emerging markets. It was introduced in March 2015 to compete with Google's Android One. The phone offers Lumia Denim out of the box and comes pre-installed with Lumia Selfie.

== Specifications ==
=== Hardware ===
The Lumia 430 has a 4.0-inch IPS LCD, dual-core 1.2 GHz Cortex-A7 Qualcomm Snapdragon 200 processor, 1 GB of RAM and 8 GB of internal storage that can be expanded using microSD cards up to 256 GB. The phone has a 1500 mAh Li-ion battery, 2-megapixel rear camera and VGA front-facing camera. It is available in black and orange.

=== Software ===
The Lumia 430 ships with Windows Phone 8.1.

== Reception ==
Jon Devo from TrustedReviews wrote: "We can only recommend the Microsoft Lumia 430 phone if you find the Windows Phone 8.1 OS preferable to Android. Otherwise stronger alternatives can be found for the money."

Sean Cameron from TechRadar pointed out the eye-catching looks, the sturdy, comfortable design and that it makes a great first impression, but disliked the poor screen, the bad camera and the laggy performance.

== See also ==
- Microsoft Lumia
- Microsoft Lumia 435
- Microsoft Lumia 650
