= Nokia Fastlane =

User interface

- Developer: Microsoft Mobile Oy (originally Nokia)
- Working state: Closed
- Available in: Multi-lingual
- Supported platforms: Nokia Asha platform, Nokia X platform, Nokia Lumia
- Official website: nokia.com/ru-ru/newasha/fastlane,%20http://www.microsoft.com/ru-ru/mobile/newasha/fastlane/

Nokia Fastlane is a user interface from Nokia, used on the Nokia Asha platform and Nokia X platform. Fastlane is a timeline of activities and is accessed by swiping left or right from the start screen. The first device to run Fastlane was Nokia Asha 501.

Fastlane has an Facebook's "What's On Your Mind" Feature. It also has an "Upcoming Events" Feature.

== Compatibility ==
Phones running Nokia Asha Software Platform (1.0/1.1/1.2) including:

- Nokia Asha 230
- Nokia Asha 500
- Nokia Asha 501
- Nokia Asha 502
- Nokia Asha 503

Phones running Nokia X Platform (1.0.1/1.1.1/1.1.2.2/2.0) including:

- Nokia X
- Nokia X+
- Nokia XL
- Nokia X2 (2014)

== See also ==
- Nokia
- Nokia Asha 501
- Nokia Asha platform
- Nokia X
