= Nokia X2 (2014) =

Smartphone

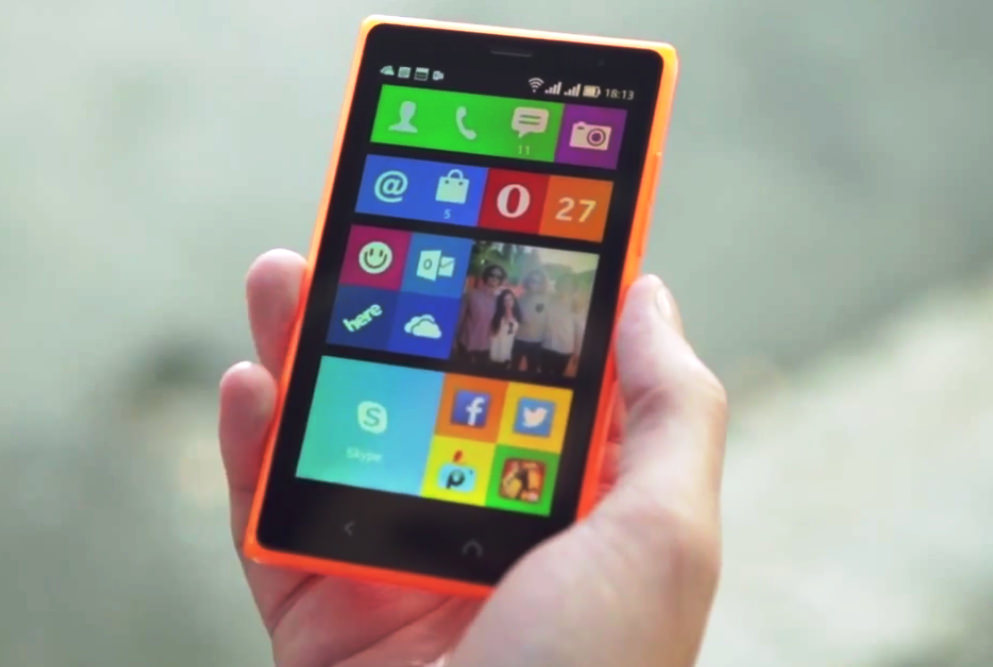
- Home screen of Nokia X2
- Brand: Nokia
- Manufacturer: Microsoft Mobile
- Type: Smartphone
- Series: Nokia X family
- First released: 24 June 2014
- Discontinued: 17 July 2014
- Predecessor: Nokia X
- Successor: Nokia 2 Nokia 3 Nokia 2.2; Nokia C series (2019-2024)
- Related: List of Nokia products
- Compatible networks: 3G; 2G; WCDMA network: 900 MHz, 2100 MHz; WCDMA max data speed DL:HSDPA - 21.1 Mb/s; WCDMA max data speed UL:HSUPA - 5.76 Mb/s; GSM network: 850 MHz, 900 MHz, 1800 MHz, 1900 MHz; GSM max data speed DL:EGPRS 296.0 kb/s; GSM max data speed UL:GPRS 236.8 kb/s
- Form factor: Bar
- Dimensions: Height: 121.7 mm; Width: 68.3 mm; Thickness: 11.1 mm
- Weight: 150 g (5 oz)
- Operating system: Nokia X platform 2.0 (Android 4.3 Jellybean)
- System-on-chip: Qualcomm Snapdragon 400 MSM8926
- CPU: 1.2 GHz dual ARM Cortex-A7 CPU
- GPU: Adreno 305
- Memory: RAM 1 GB
- Storage: 4 GB
- Removable storage: Expandable up to 32 GB
- Battery: 1800 mAh
- Rear camera: 5.0 megapixel with LED flash
- Front camera: 2.0 megapixel
- Display: Display size: 4.3 inch (11 cm); Display resolution: WVGA (800x 480); Display features: Brightness control, Tactile feedback, orientation sensor, Nokia Glance screen, scratch resistant glass, double-tap to wake; Display colors: TrueColor (24-bit/16M); Aspect ratio: 16:9; Pixel density: 217 ppi; Display Technology: ClearBlack, LCD
- Sound: Audio playback file formats: WAV, MP4, AAC, MP3, AWB, M4A, MIDI, FLAC, 3GP, AVI, MKV, OGG, MKA: Audio recording file formats: AAC, AMR Audio recording codecs:AMR-WB, AAC LC, AMR-NB Audio recording features:Mono: 3.5 mm audio connector
- Connectivity: WIFI; Micro USB 2.0; Bluetooth 4.0; WAPI
- Data inputs: User Input: touch; Operating keys: power key, volume keys, back key, home key
- Website: Nokia X2 Dual SIM home page

The Nokia X2 is an entry-level smartphone which was announced and released by Microsoft Mobile on 24 June 2014. It is the successor of the Nokia X, being the first smartphone running version 2.0 of the Android-based Nokia X platform operating system. The Nokia X family of Android phones was discontinued on July 17, 2014.

== Specifications ==
=== Display ===
The Nokia X2 features a 4.3 inch (11 cm) ClearBlack IPS LCD with WVGA resolution (480x800 pixels) that offers a pixel density of 217 ppi.

=== Software ===
Nokia X2 is based on AOSP (Android open source project) and comes with the Nokia X software platform 2.0, the successor of X software platform 1.0. It is a modified version of Android Jelly Bean 4.3 and can run all Android apps except Google service apps like Google Maps, Playstore, Gmail etc. By rooting one can use all Google services. Nokia X Platform 2.0 features a tile-based, customisable app launcher with a notification logging interface called Fastlane and supports multitasking through a card-based app switcher. Nokia X2 comes pre-loaded with Nokia Store, Facebook, Twitter, Outlook, OneDrive, Opera Mini and many more.

=== Hardware ===
The device has a 4.3 inch (11 cm) screen size. It is charged over USB, and a 3.5 mm audio jack is also included. It has an 1800 mAh removable battery which gives 23 days on standby, as well as a MicroSD slot and a memory card slot. The rear camera is 5 MP with LED flash, and there's also a 2.0 MP front camera. It has a 1.2 GHz dual-core Qualcomm Snapdragon 200 processor and 1 GB of RAM.

== Changes from the past Nokia X phones ==
Nokia X2 has a lot of changes compared to the original. It is powered by a 1.2 GHz dual-core Snapdragon 200 SoC, a significant upgrade from the older 1 GHz dual-core Snapdragon S4 Play used in the previous Nokia X series. It features hardware back and home buttons, as opposed to the single back button on the past Nokia X devices. OS version has changed to Nokia X Software Platform 2.0 (based on Android 4.3 Jellybean) from 1.0 (Android Jellybean 4.1.2), with the amount of RAM increasing to 1 GB. The screen has changed to a 4.3 inch (11 cm) ClearBlack LCD panel, which is slightly bigger than the Nokia X (1st version) with a 4.0 inch (10 cm) screen.

== Discontinuation of the Nokia X Platform ==
On July 17, 2014, Microsoft devices chief Stephen Elop announced that select future Nokia X devices would be shifted to the Windows Phone platform, effectively making them low-cost Lumia devices. This announcement lead to considerable speculation regarding the future of the Nokia X platform and the X series. However, the Nokia X2 was on sale in certain markets such as Pakistan and Russia as of 31 July 2014, and it will be the last Nokia X family device and the last Nokia-branded Android device. The Nokia N1 introduced in November 2014 and Nokia 6 in January 2017 are the first Nokia-branded tablet and smartphone respectively after the discontinuation of Nokia X family. Meanwhile, in Microsoft, the Microsoft Surface Duo launched in August 2020 as the company's first true Android mobile device.
