= MixRadio =

Defunct online music streaming service

MixRadio / Nokia Music
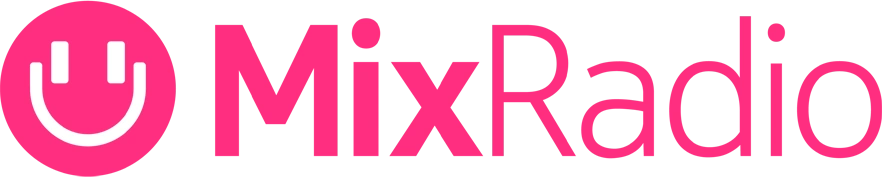
- Developers: Nokia (2007-2014); Microsoft Mobile (2014-2015); Line Corporation (2015-2016)
- Release: October 1, 2007; 19 years ago (as Nokia Music Store)
- Final release: 4.5.2766 (Android), 1.7.0.2723 (iOS), 4.5.4.481 (Windows Phone) / 10 March 2016; 10 years ago, 16 February 2016; 10 years ago, 11 March 2016; 10 years ago
- Operating system: Mobile, desktop and watch
- Website: mixradiomusic.com (dead link) musicstore.nokia.com (dead link) music.nokia.com (dead link)

MixRadio was an online music streaming service that was operated by Line Corporation at the time of closure. The service was first introduced by Nokia in October 2011 as Nokia Music for Windows Phone, serving as a successor to their previous digital music initiatives that date back to the Nokia Music Store launched in 2007. It was rebranded to MixRadio in November 2013. Line Corporation took control of the service in 2015 and expanded the service to Android and iOS in May 2015. MixRadio was shut down in March 2016.

At the time of closure, Line's MixRadio was available as a free app for Android, iOS, Apple Watch, Amazon Appstore, BlackBerry, Windows Phone, Adidas miCoach Smart Run and Harman Kardon Omni Speaker range.

== History ==
=== Nokia Music Store and Ovi Music ===
On 29 August 2007 Nokia launched the Nokia Music Store as part of the Ovi services portal from Nokia. It was based on the LoudEye/OD2 platform. The original idea behind the store was to provide to all Nokia MP3 capable mobile users a music store on the phone as on the PC. The Nokia Music Store officially opened first in the UK on 1 October 2007 with offering of music from Sony BMG, Universal Music, EMI and Warner Music Group, as well as others.

The Nokia Music Store accessed from a Symbian phone

The introduction of the Nokia Music Store was not met enthusiastically with some mobile network operators who were already operating their own music download stores. Nokia managed to struck a deal to sell Kylie Minogue's X on the store in the UK from 21 November 2007, five days before its slated international release. The launch of the store in other European countries was delayed to 2008.

The roll-out of the Nokia Music Store service differed by country and region. It went live in Australia on 22 April 2008, in France on 23 April 2008, Spain on 28 September 2008, United Arab Emirates in November 2008, South Africa on 24 April 2009 (with Comes With Music following on 27 August 2009), India in 2009, and on February 11, 2010 (Comes With Music service) in 11 countries and territories in the Middle East: Egypt, Lebanon, Jordan, the Palestinian Territories, Iraq, Saudi Arabia, the United Arab Emirates, Kuwait, Qatar, Bahrain, and Oman.

This service had its own PC software to serve as front gate of the store on the PC and on the phones. It was called Nokia Music initially, then renamed to Nokia Ovi Player in late 2009, and later Nokia Music Player in late 2011.

Until 2010 the service had DRM files that prevented files from being burn onto CDs, allowing playback from mobile devices and the PC software only. Market conditions encouraged a move to DRM free, as evidenced in the Brainstorm Magazine article "Music wants to be mobile...and DRM free". In case the user wanted to burn the song, they had to buy it from the store. Along with going DRM-free by the third quarter of 2010, the Nokia Music Store was also rebranded to Ovi Music to align with Nokia's Ovi branding.

During the latter part of 2010 and into 2011, Nokia Music continued developing its app client for the MeeGo platform along with its existing Symbian platform.

=== Comes With Music ===
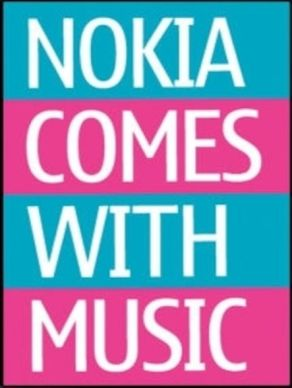
Comes with Music branding

In October 2008, Nokia announced the Nokia 5800 XpressMusic, a direct touchscreen competitor to the iPhone and with it came the service Comes With Music, which consists of a year of free music downloads from the Nokia Music Store included in the price of the phone. This service was optional to the carriers. Within the box of the phone there was a card with an ID that will be linked to the PC (MAC address) and mobile phone (IMEI), so that PC and mobile phone have unlimited music downloads for over a year. The Comes With Music was initially announced in December 2007 to allow 12, 18, or 24 months of unlimited free-of-charge music downloads with the purchase of a Nokia Comes With Music edition phone. Files could be downloaded on mobile devices or personal computers, and kept permanently. As of April 2009, Comes With Music is available bundled with new Nokia 5800 XpressMusic, Nokia 5310 XpressMusic, Nokia N96 and Nokia N95 8GB devices.

Comes With Music was rebranded to Ovi Music Unlimited in all territories by late 2010.

In January 2011 Nokia withdrew the Ovi Music Unlimited programme in 27 countries, due to its failure to gain traction; existing subscribers could continue to download until their contracts ended. It notably failed to catch on in markets like Europe, partly due to lack of support from the mobile operators. The service continued to be offered until 2014 in China, India, Indonesia, Brazil, Turkey and South Africa where take-up was better.

=== Nokia Music and MixRadio ===
Screenshots of the Nokia Music app on Lumia

The Nokia Music app was announced for the first time on the Windows Phone platform with the Lumia 710 and Lumia 800 on 26 October 2011 in London. It has a radio-style music streaming service called MixRadio, an events finder called Gigfinder, offers music downloads from its existing Nokia MP3 Store catalogue in 38 countries, and plays locally stored music files.

With the launch of Windows Phone 8 in late 2012, Nokia Music came to the platform with an app optimised for the new operating system from Microsoft. In the following months, Nokia Music was released to the Windows Store on Windows 8 and Windows RT.

Nokia Music launched in the U.S. market on 15 September 2012 with a performance at Irving Plaza by Green Day. Fans were treated to a special performance from the band, along with heavy social media involvement by AT&T, Nokia, the band themselves and Warner Bros.

A premium subscription service called Nokia Music+ was later also released in some territories.

On 20 November 2013 Nokia renamed the entire app and service to "Nokia MixRadio". This change also made its way to the Windows 8 and Windows RT app stores The following day, Nokia MixRadio made its official global launch with a special event in New York City where Nile Rodgers played.

Nokia MixRadio began the year with the launch of the MixRadio app for the Nokia Asha and Nokia X platforms at GSMA Mobile World Congress in February 2014.

The service was again renamed to only "MixRadio" on 1 July 2014, to reflect the change of ownership from Nokia to Microsoft. On 11 September 2014, the MixRadio application was announced for the Sonos range of wireless speakers with a companion app. MixRadio further extended their reach on 27 November 2014, with the application being added to the adidas miCoach Smart Run touchscreen watch.

=== Sale of MixRadio to Line Corporation ===
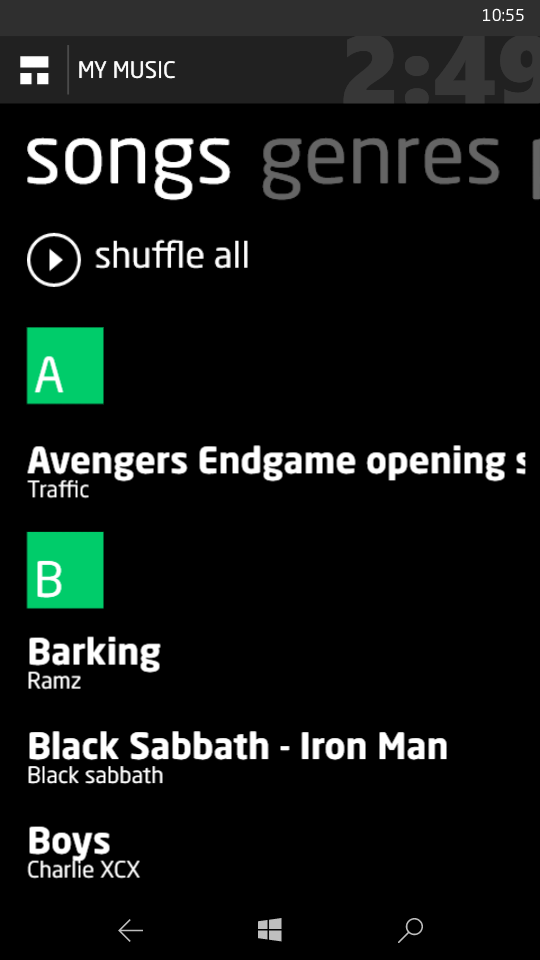
The list of songs as displayed by MixRadio on Windows Phone

On 18 December 2014, after mulling a spin-off of the service, Microsoft announced that it would sell MixRadio to Line Corporation, a subsidiary of Naver Corporation, for an undisclosed amount. On 17 March 2015, the transaction was completed. At this time, beta versions of the app were released for Android and iOS.

On 19 May 2015 MixRadio announced the launch of the commercial iOS and Android apps with simultaneous launch events in New York City and Singapore. MixRadio also announced their partnership with HTC at this event to integrate MixRadio into the BlinkFeed software of HTC smartphones. The HTC BlinkFeed integration with MixRadio went live on 9 June 2015.

During the third quarter of 2015, MixRadio further expanded its reach to other platforms, namely Apple Watch, Amazon Appstore and Tizen. In the first week of November 2015, MixRadio launched as a fully featured web browser client for the Windows and OS X operating systems, mirroring the look and functionality of its smartphone apps. Starting in late September 2015, MixRadio was made available to download through the Amazon Appstore (and consequently BlackBerry devices). The app was also preinstalled on the Samsung Z3, a smartphone running the Tizen operating system.

In late August 2015, MixRadio beta was opened to the general public to help test and contribute feedback regarding the app itself. The public betas were later expanded to the MixRadio client on iOS in early October 2015.

=== Discontinuation ===
On 16 February 2016, Line announced that MixRadio would be discontinued, citing "a careful assessment of the subsidiary's overall performance" and "the financial challenges posed by the music streaming market". MixRadio was officially closed on 21 March 2016.

== Features ==
=== Catalogue ===
As of June 2015, MixRadio had licensed a collection of over 36 million music tracks. These tracks were collated from major, major independent and local music labels.

=== Mixes ===
MixRadio operated on the premise of playlists, named "mixes". Upon loading the app for the first time, the user was prompted to select some of their favourite genres, which will then ask for favourite artists that the user can choose. This was then designated the user's "My mix". Users were also able to select pre-made mixes by theme or genre, (for example 'Top 40 Australian charts' or 'Rock workout') or create their own mix purely on the selection of artists.

=== Optimised mixes ===
Users of MixRadio were able to like ('heart') or dislike ('broken heart)' a song as it is played, upon which these personal listening tastes are saved and new songs based on the users' preferences are played next in the mix. MixRadio possessed a team of staff that personally curated mixes tailored to the data collected around listeners' tastes and habits.

=== Offline mixes ===
A big premise of MixRadio was its ability to download mixes offline. This enabled users to listen to their favourite mixes when not in range of a WiFi or mobile data connection.

=== Unlimited downloads ===
In India, MixRadio was available for all Nokia Asha, Lumia and Nokia X phones. Users could download songs from MixRadio for free for the first three months after purchase of a Nokia Asha, Lumia or X-series phone, following which the subscription could be renewed for a fixed time period through the purchase of a voucher either online via the Oxicash website or offline through Nokia Care outlets. For Nokia Asha phones, subscription could also be renewed via carrier billing, with the supported carriers being Airtel, Vodafone and Idea. However, the vouchers were no longer issued from May 2014 and in November 2014, Microsoft announced that unlimited downloads from MixRadio will no longer be supported.
