= Nokia N1 =

Tablet developed by Nokia

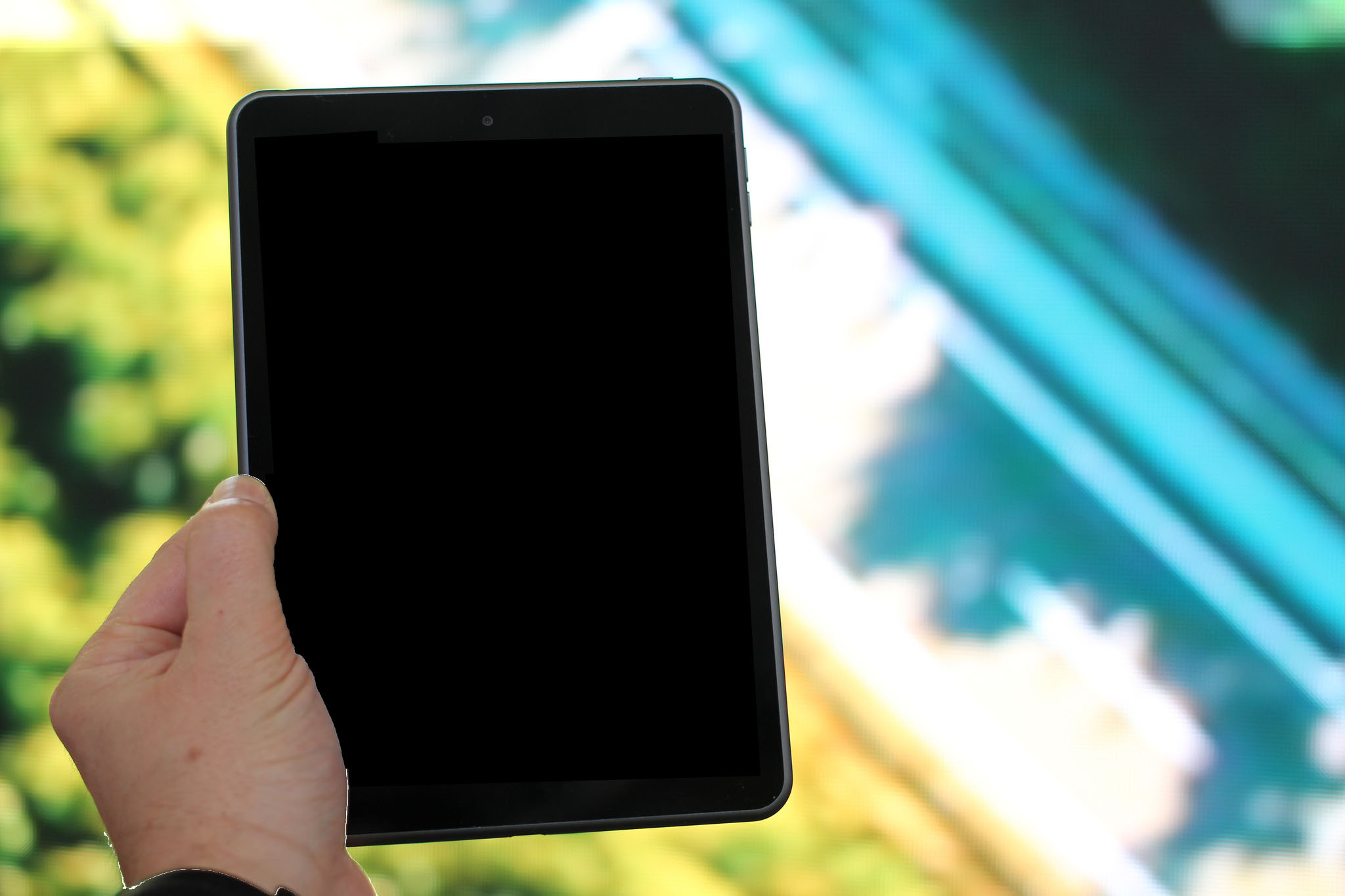
- Developer: Nokia
- Manufacturer: Foxconn
- Type: Tablet
- Operating system: Android 5.0 "Lollipop"
- System on a chip: Intel Atom Z3580
- CPU: 2.4 GHz quad-core
- Memory: 2 GB
- Storage: 32 GB
- Display: 2048×1536 px (326 PPI), 7.9 in (200 mm) diagonal, 4:3 LED-backlit IPS LCD
- Input: Multi-touch screen
- Camera: Rear 8 mega-pixels, Front 5MP photos
- Connectivity: List: 3.5 mm (0.14 in) TRRS; Bluetooth; USB 2.0; Wi-Fi
- Power: Built-in rechargeable Li-Po battery 3.7 V 19.6 W·h (5,300 mA·h)
- Weight: 318 g (0.701 lb)
- Predecessor: Nokia Lumia 2520
- Website: Nokia N1

The Nokia N1 is a tablet developed by Nokia, running on Android 5.0. Unveiled on 18 November 2014, it is Nokia's first mobile device since the sale of its original mobile phone business to Microsoft earlier in the year. It was released in January 2015.

== Development ==
According to Sebastian Nyström, Head of Products Business Nokia Technologies, work on the tablet began on 28 April just days after the acquisition of its former mobile phone division by Microsoft. The unveiling of the N1 came shortly after an announcement on 17 November 2014 by Nokia Technologies President Ramzi Haidamus, that the company would begin to contract the manufacturing of future Nokia products to third-party companies, to ensure a continued consumer presence for the "valuable" Nokia brand. As part of the sale, Nokia is subject to non-compete clauses forbidding it from producing Nokia-branded smartphones until the end of 2015, and feature phones for 10 years after the closure of the Microsoft sale, but is still free to produce devices in other product segments, such as tablets.

The Nokia N1 was ultimately unveiled the next day at the Slush conference. While using a Nokia design, its software technology, and brand under license, Foxconn will be responsible for manufacturing, marketing, distribution, and technical support for the N1, and not Nokia.

The N1 is one of the first major devices to include the new reversible "type-C" USB connector; although the new design is part of the updated USB 3.1 specification, the N1 will only support USB 2.0 speeds. In response to this regression, a Nokia spokesperson stated that "our partner didn’t have access to that kind of solution on the chipset that we’re building the device on. It’s just a pure question of having the availability. We believe that the reversible connector is an easier way, and of course the chipset from Intel is quite capable and we wanted to maximize the capability there, but the 3.1 USB capability was not available for this chipset at this time."

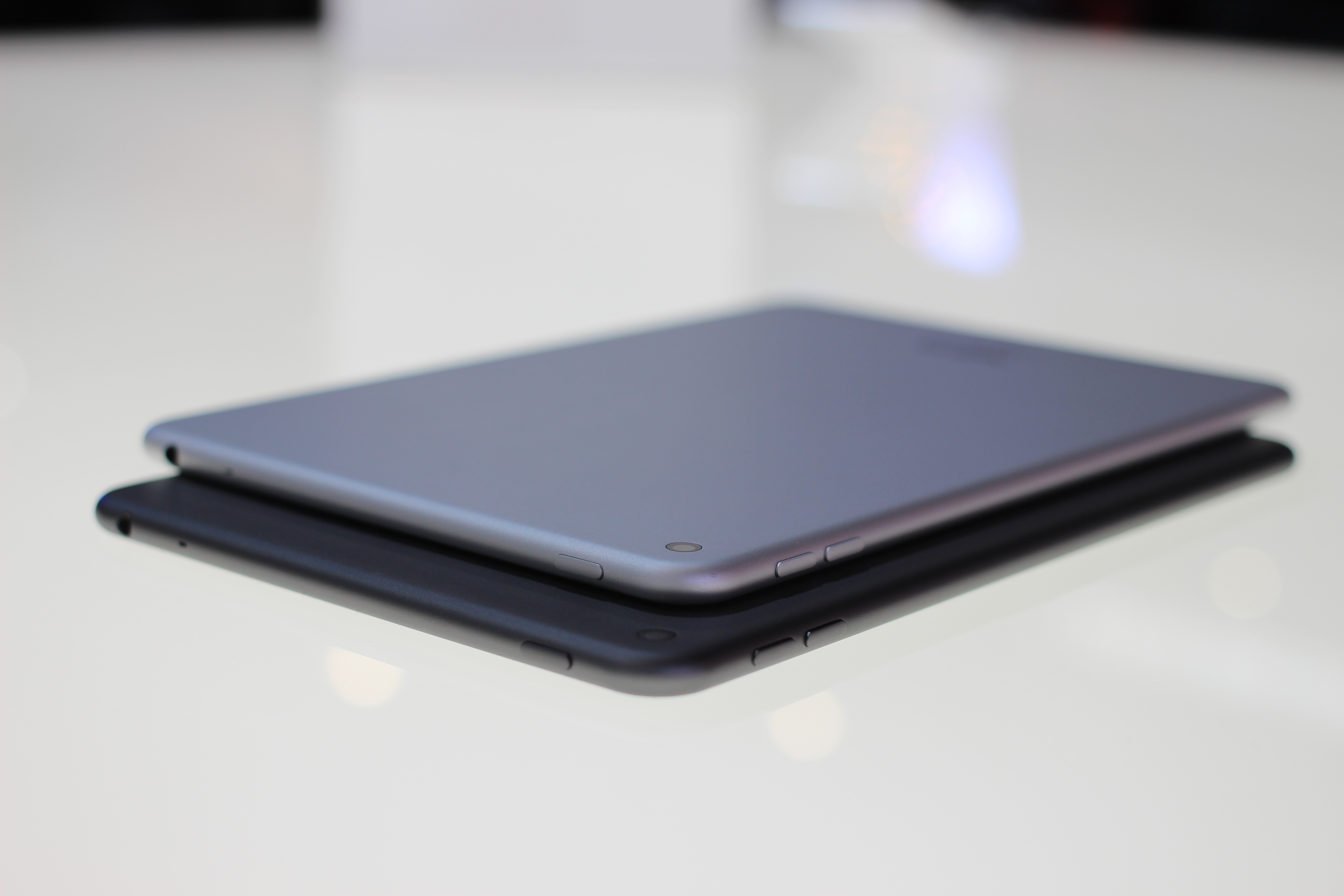
The reverse of the device

== Specifications ==
The overall design and hardware specifications of the N1 are very similar to the iPad Mini 2, featuring an aluminium unibody chassis, a laminated 7.9-inch IPS LCD, a 64-bit, 2.4 GHz quad-core Intel Atom system-on-chip with 2 GB of RAM, and 32 GB of internal storage. The N1 includes an 8-megapixel rear-facing camera, and a 5-megapixel front-facing camera.

The N1 runs an otherwise stock distribution of Android 5.0 "Lollipop", but includes an alternative home screen known as Z Launcher. Z Launcher emphasizes the use of gestures for navigation; users can search for applications or contacts by tracing letters onto the device's screen. Z Launcher was also released via Google Play Store for Android smartphones, but the tablet version is exclusive to the N1. The N1 is the first Nokia-branded device to officially support Google Mobile Services and ship with access to Google Play Store; the discontinued Nokia X series used a fork of Android, Nokia X software platform, which substituted Google's proprietary software with similar apps from Nokia and Microsoft, and used a Nokia-specific application store.

== Release ==
The N1 was released in China in February 2015, with a release in Taiwan and European countries following. It is unknown whether the N1 was released in any other regions.
