= Nokia XL =

Smartphone

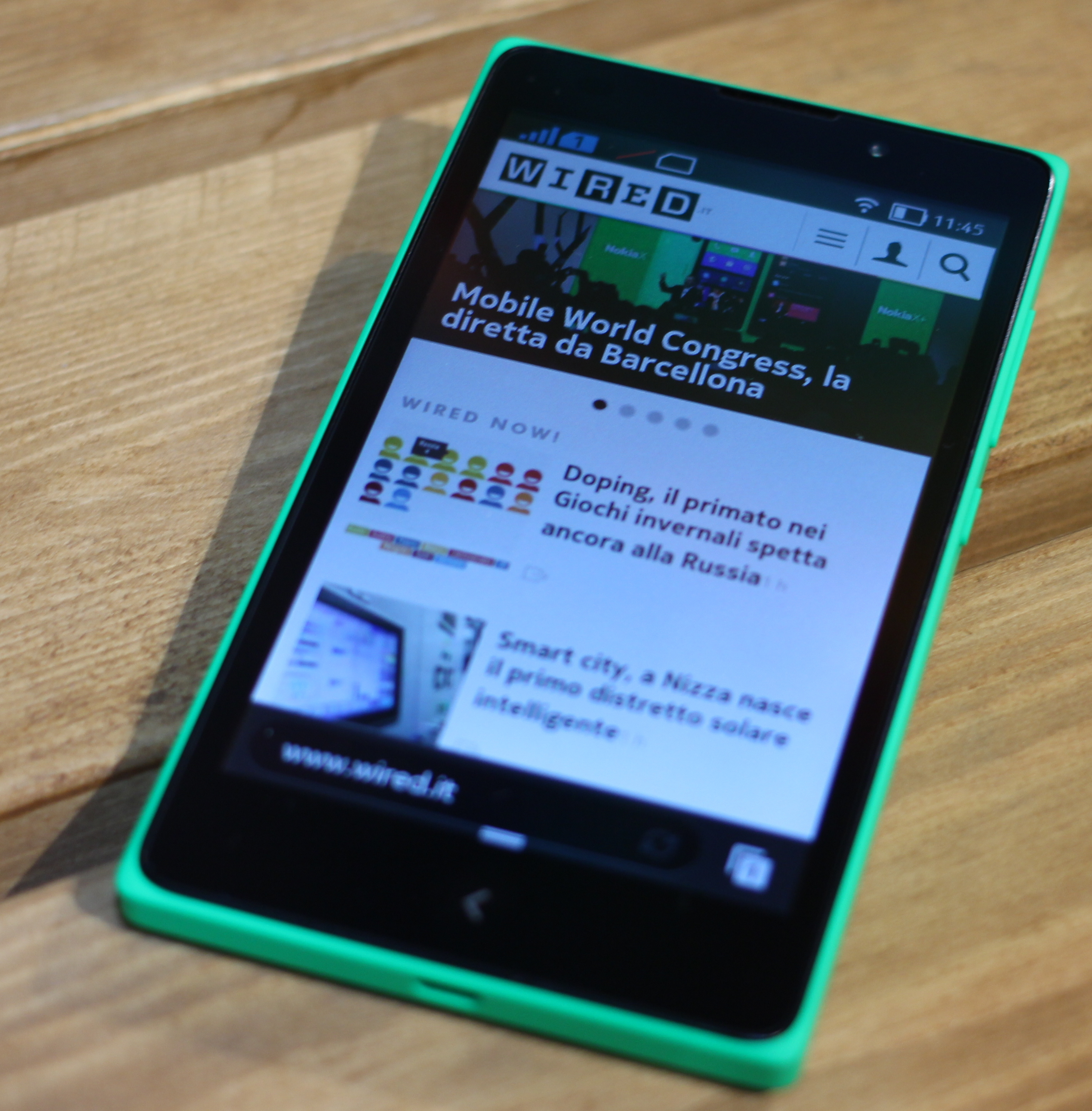
- Developer: Nokia, before Microsoft acquisition
- Manufacturer: Microsoft Mobile
- Type: Touchscreen smartphone
- Series: Nokia X family
- First released: 24 February 2014
- Availability by region: 24 February 2014
- Successor: Nokia 3
- Compatible networks: WCDMA network: 900 MHz, 2100 MHz GSM network: 850 MHz, 900 MHz, 1800 MHz, 1900 MHz; LTE Edition: D-LTE and TD-SCDMA LTE bands - 38, 39, 40 (China)
- Form factor: Slate
- Dimensions: 141.4 mm (5.57 in) H 77.7 mm (3.06 in) W 10.9 mm (0.43 in) D.
- Weight: 190 g (6.7 oz); LTE Edition: 158 g (5.6 oz)
- Operating system: Nokia X Software Platform
- System-on-chip: Qualcomm Snapdragon S4 Play MSM8225; LTE Edition: MSM8926 Qualcomm Snapdragon 400
- CPU: 1.0 GHz dual-core (ARMv7)
- Memory: 768 MB RAM
- Storage: 4 GB
- Removable storage: microSD up to 32 GB
- SIM: Micro-SIM Dual SIM: Dual standby SIM
- Battery: Li-ion 2,000 mAh
- Rear camera: 5.0 MP with flash, 2592×1944 pixels, Autofocus, 4× zoom
- Front camera: 2.0 MP, 1600×1200 pixels
- Display: 5.0 in (13 cm); 480×800 px IPS WVGA
- Connectivity: Bluetooth 3.0 + HS; micro-USB 2.0; WiFi 802.11 b/g/n; 3.5 mm audio connector; WAPI
- Data inputs: User input: Touch Operating keys: Volume keys, back key, lock key
- Website: http://www.nokia.com/global/products/phone/nokia-xl/

The Nokia XL is a smartphone announced as part of the Nokia X family in February 2014, running on the Nokia X platform. It is currently sold and maintained by Microsoft Mobile.

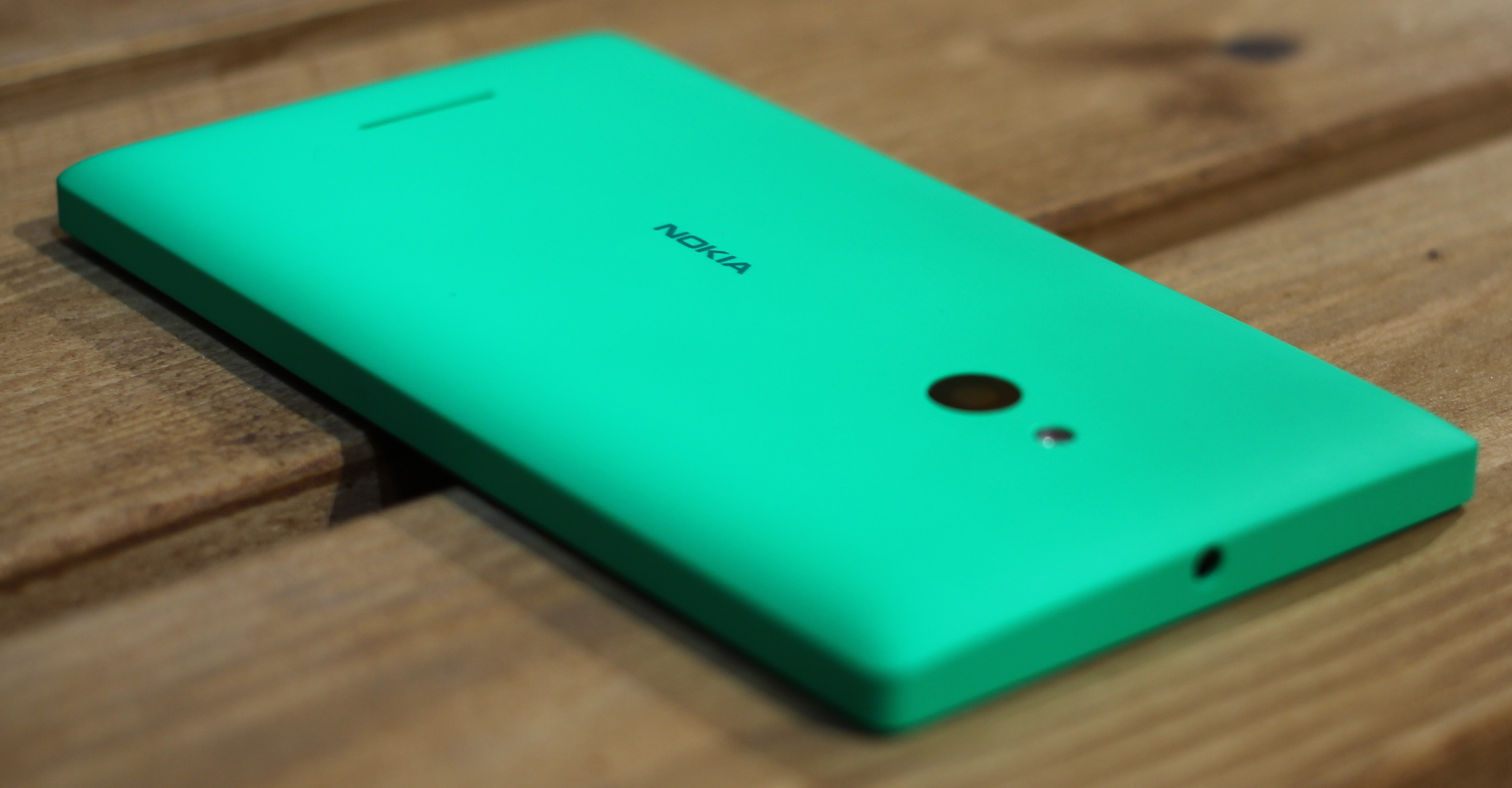
The rear side of the device

== Specification sheet ==
| Type | Specification |
|---|---|
| Weight | 190 g |
| Dimensions | 141.4 mm x 77.7 mm x 10.9 mm |
| Battery life | Talk time: 13 hours (GSM) standby: 30 days (GSM) |
| Display | Type: IPS Size 5.0 in resolution: 480×800 pixels, 185 ppi |
| Operating system (UI) | Android 4.1.2 (Nokia X 1.x UI) |
| Dual SIM | Yes |
| SIM Type | Micro-SIM (available in single SIM and dual SIM slot versions) |
| Storage | 4 GB |
| Multiple languages | Yes |
| Bluetooth | 3.0 DUN, FTP, GAP, GOEP, HFP, HSP, OPP, PAN, PBAP, SAP, SDAP, SPP |
| PC Sync | Yes |
| USB | micro-USB |
| Custom graphics | Yes |
| Custom ringtones | Yes |
| Data-capable | Yes |
| Flight mode | Yes |
| WLAN | Yes, with hotspot |
| Memory card slot | microSD up to 32 GB |
| MMS | MMS 1.2 / SMIL |
| ram size | 768MB |
| Text messaging | 2-way: Yes |
| FM radio | Stereo: Yes |
| Music Player | Yes |
| Back camera | 5.0 megapixels |
| Front camera | 2.0 megapixels |
| Flash | Yes |
| Video capture | 30 fps |
| Headset jack | Yes (3.5 mm) |
| Speaker phone | yes |

== Background ==
The Nokia XL was announced in a surprising manner at the 2014 edition of Mobile World Congress on 24 February 2014 which was held in Barcelona, Spain.

Reports suggested only a 4-inch touchscreen Android running Nokia X will be unveiled but Nokia also announced the 'Nokia X family' which was made up of Nokia X, Nokia X+ and Nokia XL.

Nokia XL was much of a hardware upgrade from the other members of the maiden Nokia X family. It came with a 5-inch touchscreen instead of the 4-inch ones on the others. It featured a bigger camera (5 MP sensor) and also a LED flash and 2 MP front-facing camera—the last two are absent on the Nokia X and Nokia X+ models.

The phone was known in the development stages as "Asha Monster".

== Nokia XL 4G ==
An LTE version was released in China in July 2014.

| Type | Specification |
|---|---|
| Screen | 5 in (13 cm) IPS LCD, 800 x 480px, 187ppi |
| RAM | 1 GB |
| Internal storage and included microSD card | 4 GB internal Up to 32 GB MicroSD card support, 4 GB card included |
| Rear camera | 5 MP, autofocus and flash |
| Front camera | 2.0 MP |
| SoC | Qualcomm Snapdragon MSM8926 |
| CPU | 1.2 GHz quad-core |
| Networks | TD-LTE: 38, 39, 40 (China); TD-SCDMA: 1900 MHz, 39; WCDMA: 850 MHz, 900 MHz, 2100 MHz; GSM: 900 MHz, 1800 MHz, 1900 MHz |
| Dimensions | 141.3 x 77.7 x 10.8 mm |
| Weight | 158 g |
| Battery life (on standby) | 21 days |
| Battery life (talk time) | 2G: 15 hours, 3G: 11 hours, 4G: unknown |
| Operating system | Nokia X 1.x software platform (AOSP 4.2.x) |
