= Nokia X =

Android smartphone model

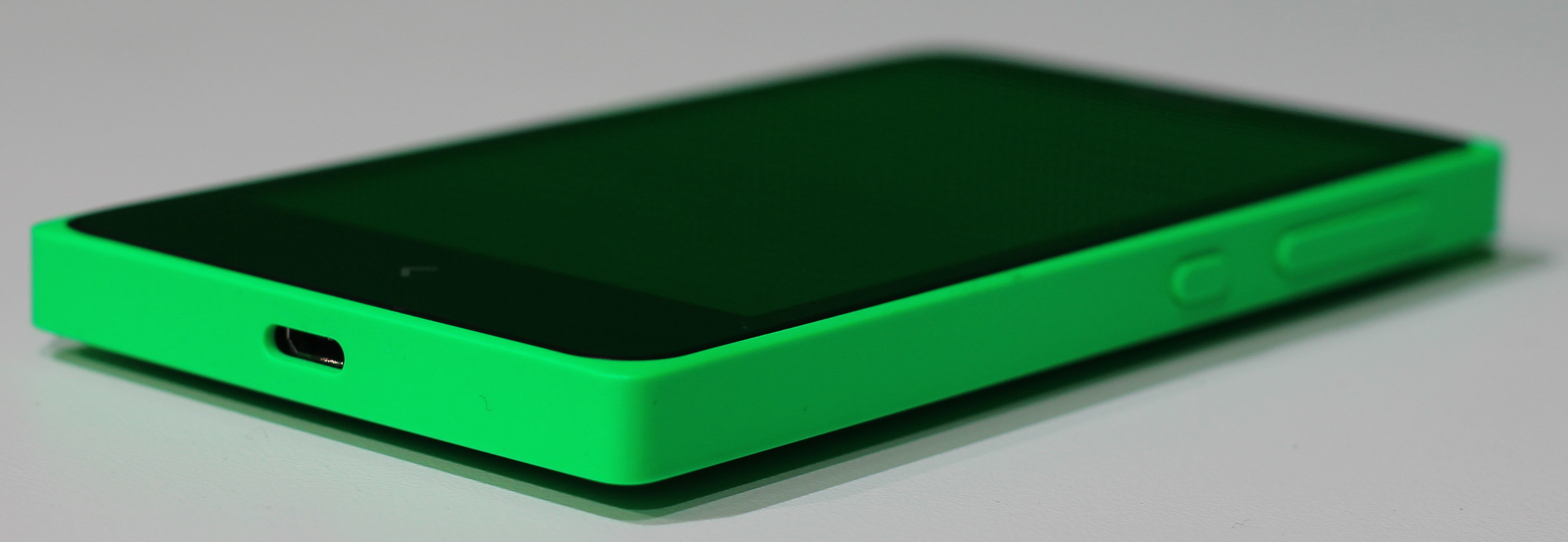
- Brand: Nokia
- Manufacturers: Nokia, later Microsoft Mobile
- Type: Touchscreen Smartphone
- Series: Nokia X family
- First released: 24 February 2014
- Availability by region: 24 February 2014
- Discontinued: 17 July 2014
- Predecessor: Nokia Asha 501
- Successor: Nokia X2
- Compatible networks: (GSM/GPRS/EDGE): 850, 900, 1,800 and 1,900 MHz; 3G (HSDPA 7.2 Mbit/s, HSUPA 5.76 Mbit/s): 900 and 2,100 MHz
- Form factor: Slate
- Dimensions: 115.5 mm (4.55 in) H 10.4 mm (0.41 in) W 73.2 mm (2.88 in) D.
- Weight: 128.7 g (4.54 oz)
- Operating system: Nokia X platform (Modified Android Jelly Bean 4.1.2): Multi-touch capacitive touchscreen display, up to 2 fingers
- System-on-chip: Qualcomm Snapdragon S4 Play MSM8225
- CPU: 1.0 GHz dual-core
- GPU: Adreno 203
- Memory: 512 MB RAM (768 MB in Nokia X+ and XL)
- Storage: 4 GB
- Removable storage: microSD up to 32 GB
- Battery: Li-ion 1500 mAh
- Rear camera: 3 MP fixed focus
- Display: 4.0 in (10 cm); 800×480 px IPS WVGA (233 PPI)
- Connectivity: Bluetooth 3.0 + HS; micro-USB 2.0; Wi-Fi 802.11b/g/n

The Nokia X is a mid-tier smartphone announced as part of the Nokia X family in February 2014, running on the Nokia X platform. The device shipped on the same day as the unveiling, with Nokia targeting the product for emerging markets, and was sold and maintained by Microsoft Mobile. On 17 July 2014, Microsoft announced that it would discontinue the line.

The X was previously under development known as Normandy, Project N, the Asha on Linux project and MView.

== Unveiling ==
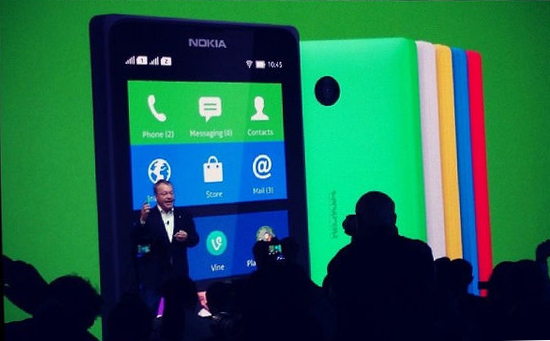
Stephen Elop unveiling the phone at MWC 2014

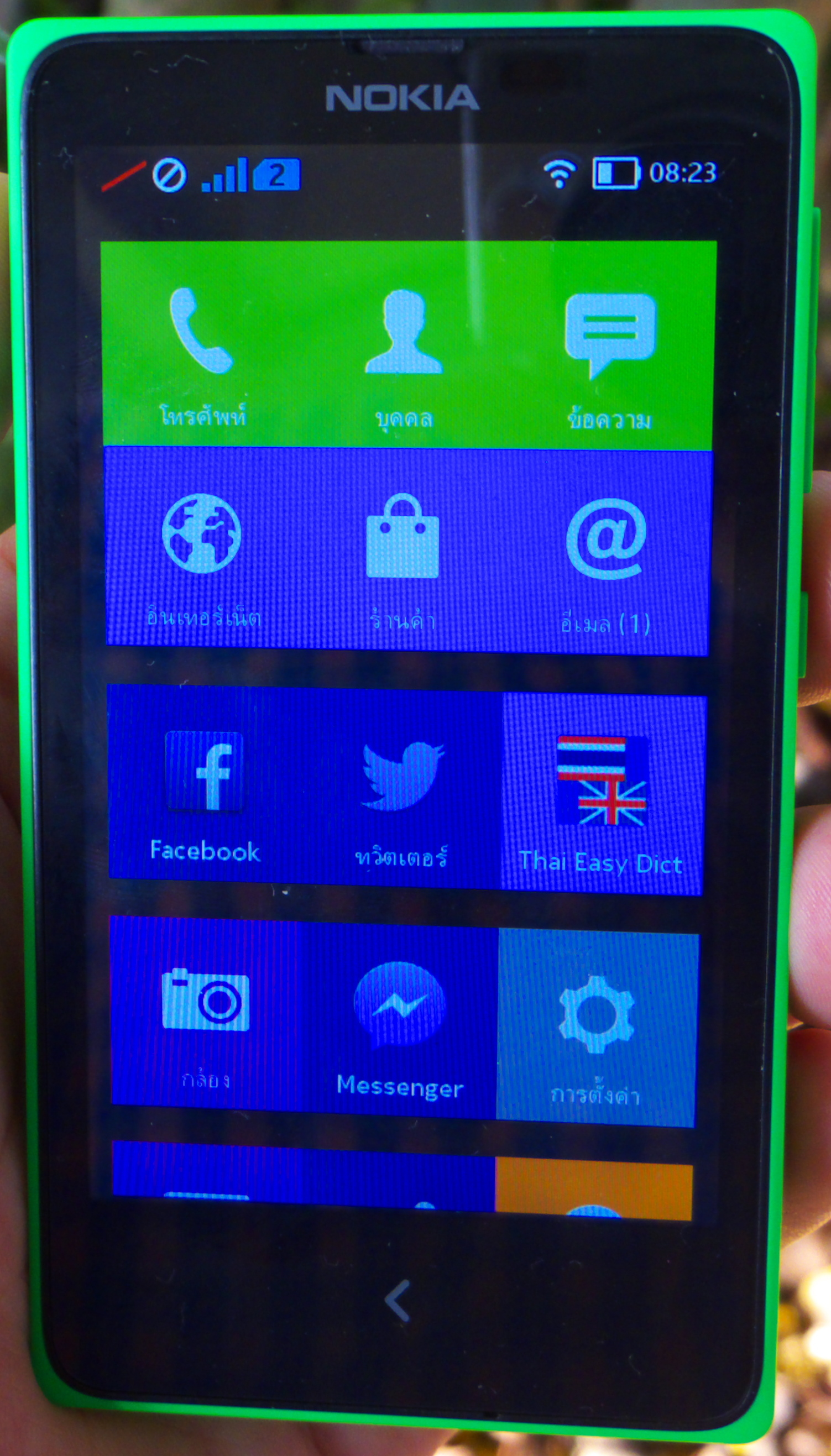
Home screen

The phone was unveiled by Stephen Elop at the 2014 Mobile World Congress, Barcelona on 24 February 2014. Contrary to previous leaks, two variants, Nokia X and Nokia X+ were released, with the Nokia X+ having 768 MB of RAM, as opposed to 512 MB of RAM, as well as with a microSD card included in the box.

A third phone, the Nokia XL, was announced, with a larger screen, front-facing camera, rear flash, and longer battery runtime.

Very soon after release, a developer had rooted the device, and enabled the installation of Google's apps and services.

== Criticism ==
The Nokia X was heavily criticized for not having a home button; this was later addressed with the Nokia X2.

== Aftermath ==
In an interview with Forbes, former HMD Global CEO Arto Nummela stated that analysis showed that the Nokia X series became surprisingly popular with users of high end Samsung and Apple smartphone devices, despite the fact that it was a mid to low end device family.
