= Nokia Steel HR =

2017 smartwatch

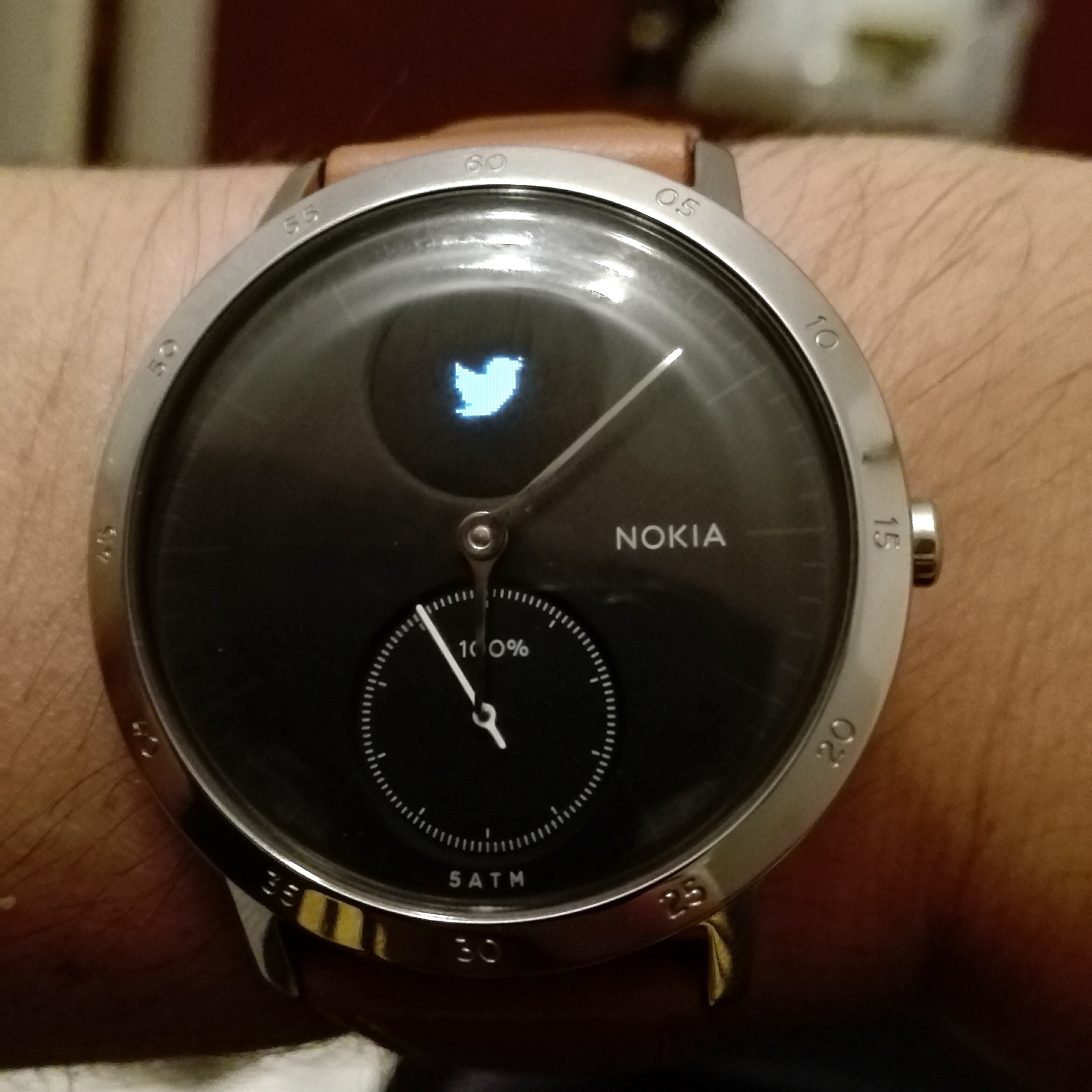
- Manufacturer: Nokia
- Type: Smart band
- Released: December 2017
- Introductory price: €189 $179 (USA) £169.99 (UK)
- Connectivity: Bluetooth
- Backward compatibility: Android iOS
- Website: health.nokia.com/es/en/steel-hr

Nokia Steel HR is a "hybrid" smartwatch and activity/fitness tracker developed by Nokia and released in December 2017. Its design is mostly based on the Withings Steel HR. The watch is available in 36 mm and 40 mm variants, available in various colours and in silicone, leather and woven straps. It pairs with a smartphone with the Nokia Health Mate application and also relays smartphone notifications. Steel HR features a heart rate monitor and is water resistant.

It was the major smartwatch carrying the Nokia brand, until the company sold back the health division to the co-founder of Withings in September 2018.
