= Nokia X platform =

Linux kernel-based mobile operating system and software platform

Nokia X software platform

- Nokia X home screen in Vietnamese
- Developer: Android Open Source Project (AOSP) code: Google; Modifications: Microsoft Mobile (formerly Nokia)
- Written in: C (core), C++, Java (UI)
- OS family: Linux
- Source model: Proprietary software based on open source Android and in all devices with proprietary components
- Initial release: 2014
- Latest release: Nokia X software platform 2.1
- Marketing target: Smartphones
- Package manager: APK
- Supported platforms: 32-bit ARM
- Kernel type: Monolithic (modified Linux kernel)
- Userland: Bionic libc, mksh shell, native core utilities with a few from NetBSD
- Default user interface: Graphical (Multi-touch)
- License: Proprietary EULA; based on Apache License 2.0; Modified Linux kernel under GNU GPL v2
- Official website: developer.nokia.com/nokia-x/platform-overview

The Nokia X platform was a Linux(kernel) -based mobile operating system and software platform originally developed by Nokia, and subsequently by Microsoft Mobile. Introduced on 24 February 2014, it was forked from Android and used on all the devices of the Nokia X family. It was also the next Nokia Linux project after the ill-fated MeeGo.

On 17 July 2014, after the acquisition of Nokia's devices unit, Microsoft announced that no more Nokia X smartphones would be introduced, marking the end of the Nokia X platform within only a few months after its introduction. The phones were succeeded by low-cost Lumia devices under the Microsoft Mobile brand name. Microsoft did not release an Android-based device under their own brand until 2020, in the form of the foldable Surface Duo.

The Nokia X software platform was based on the Android Open Source Project (AOSP) and the Linux kernel. Nokia combined Android apps with Nokia experiences (such as HERE Maps, Nokia Xpress and MixRadio) and Microsoft services (such as Skype and Outlook). Nokia officially described the software as bringing "the best of all worlds". It also encompasses features from the Asha platform, such as the Fastlane notification centre. The user interface mimics that of Windows Phone.

The OS has been compared to Amazon.com's Fire OS, which is also based on AOSP.

== Applications ==
Google's applications were replaced by Nokia's and Microsoft's. When first released, the Google Play store was not included, with Nokia offering apps from their own Nokia Store. After the v2.1 update in September 2014 users were allowed to install Google Play and various other Google services through third party tools, but if users attempt to install Google services on their Nokia X devices it would usually be "bricked" and would require the Nokia Software Recovery Tool to restore the data.

As of February 2014, 75% of Android apps were compatible with the platform. Nokia noted that developers could port the remaining missing apps in a matter of hours, and in an attempt to encourage developers to contribute to the platform, added compatible Android apps without developer approval.

== Developers ==
An SDK was available for the platform, and included an emulator based on the Android emulator. Nokia discouraged developers from using Windows Phone design patterns and encouraged the use of Android design guidelines on the Nokia X. Nokia's VP of developer relations commented that the Nokia imaging SDK would likely be ported to the platform from Windows Phone.

== Version history ==
Version	Release date	Based on AOSP (Android) version	Notes
1.0	24 February 2013	API Level 16 (4.1.2 Jelly Bean)	Launch version
1.1.1	25 March 2013	API Level 16 (4.1.2 Jelly Bean)	Performance improvements; Option to change the tile colour of 3rd party apps
1.1.2.2	10 May 2013	API Level 16 (4.1.2 Jelly Bean)	Bringing new apps OneDrive and Contact Transfer; Various performance fixes
1.2.4.1/1.2.4.21	28 July 2013	API Level 16 (4.1.2 Jelly Bean)	New app switcher; Added call reject with a message; Added contact search in the dialler; Added Outlook.com & OneNote
2.0	24 June 2014	API Level 18 (4.3 Jelly Bean)	Extra tiles with 4th column; Apps list; Tile resize and movement improvements; New camera UI; New virtual keyboard; Support for hardware-based home button
2.1	3 September 2014	API Level 18 (4.3 Jelly Bean)	Smart mode camera feature; Live wallpapers and lock-screen widgets; Google services; Local calendar support; Mail accounts auto-configuration; Landscape support for mail and messaging; Other minor improvements

== See also ==
- Nokia Asha platform
- Nokia Store
- MeeGo
- KaiOS
- HarmonyOS
