= Microsoft Mobile =

Finnish mobile phone manufacturer (2014–2017)

Microsoft Mobile Oy was a Finnish subsidiary of Microsoft Devices involved in the development and manufacturing of mobile phones. Based in Keilaniemi, Espoo, it was established in 2014 following the acquisition of Nokia's Devices and Services division by Microsoft in a deal valued at €5.4 billion, which was completed in April 2014. Nokia's then-CEO, Stephen Elop, joined Microsoft as president of its Devices division following the acquisition, and the acquisition was part of Steve Ballmer's strategy to turn Microsoft into a "devices and services" company. Under a 10-year licensing agreement, Microsoft Mobile held rights to sell feature phones running the S30/S30+ platform under the Nokia brand.

Originally Microsoft had established a major partnership with Nokia in 2011, in which the company exclusively produced smartphones using the Windows Phone platform, and promoted Microsoft services on its feature phone products (including Bing search). Microsoft also licensed Here Technologies data for its own mapping services. While Nokia's resultant Lumia range had the largest market share out of all Windows Phone vendors, Nokia's overall market share was falling rapidly due to competition from other major vendors, resulting in a dire financial situation. In September 2013, Microsoft announced its acquisition of Nokia's devices and services businesses, which closed with the formation of a Finnish subsidiary, Microsoft Mobile. On smartphones, the Nokia name was phased out in favour of Microsoft branding on future Lumia products.

While the Lumia range continued to be successful, especially with low- and mid-range devices targeting emerging markets, sales of both Microsoft-manufactured smartphones and feature phones began to see major declines, due primarily to the rapidly-deflating market share of Windows Phone. In 2015, Microsoft took a US$7.8 billion (~$10.3 billion in 2025) write-down on the Nokia purchase, and announced layoffs of 7,800 employees, primarily within Microsoft's phone business. In May 2016, Microsoft abandoned its mobile business, selling the Nokia feature phone line and trademark rights to the Finnish startup HMD Global, and announcing that it planned to cut up to 1,350 positions in Finland and focus on offering its productivity services on competing mobile platforms. In 2017, Microsoft executive Joe Belfiore revealed that Microsoft had ceased the development of new Windows phones and new features for Windows 10 Mobile, citing the losses in market share and lack of app development.

== History ==
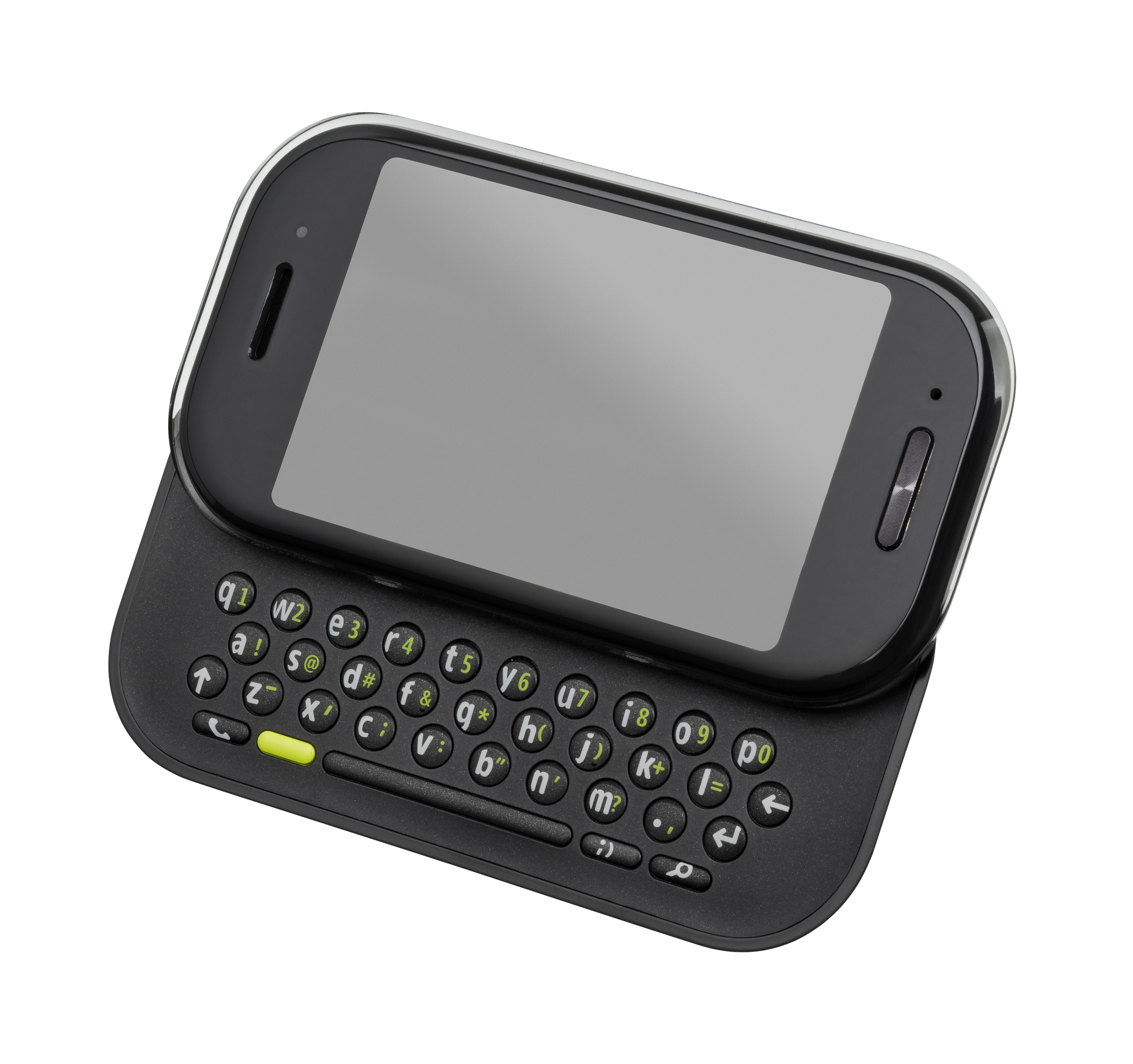
A Microsoft Kin device from 2010, Microsoft's first foray in mobile phone hardware

With the acquisition of Nokia's devices and services division, Microsoft re-entered the smartphone market. In Microsoft's previous attempt, Microsoft Kin, a result of the acquisition of Danger, Inc., had been poorly received.

=== 2011–2013: Partnership between Microsoft and Nokia ===
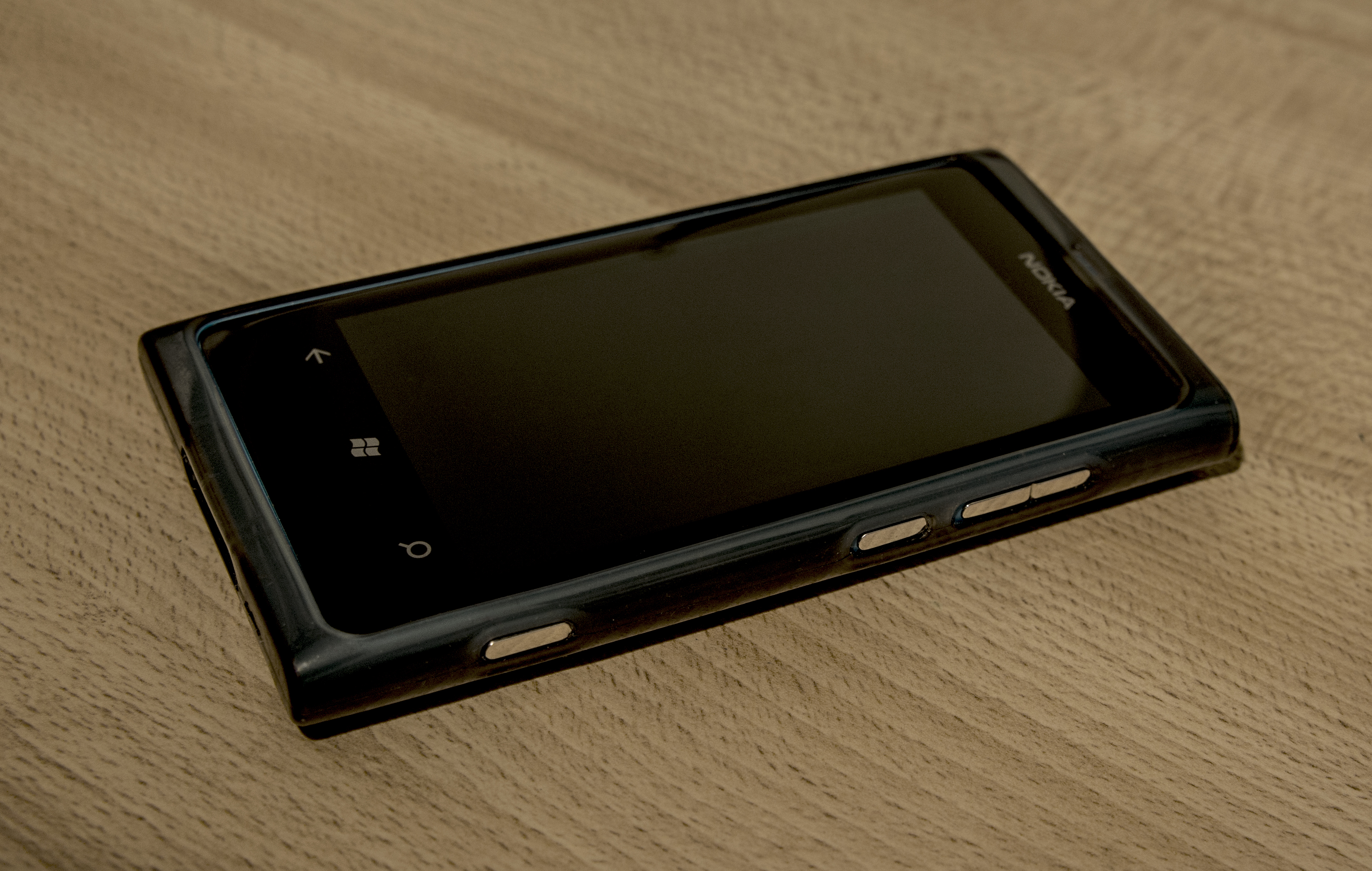
Nokia Lumia 800, Nokia's first device running Windows Phone

In February 2011, Nokia CEO Stephen Elop and Microsoft CEO Steve Ballmer jointly announced a major business partnership between the two companies, which would see Nokia adopt Windows Phone as the primary platform for its future smartphones, replacing both Symbian and MeeGo. The deal also included the use of Bing as the search engine on Nokia devices, and the integration of Nokia Maps into Microsoft's own mapping services. Nokia announced that it would still release one device running the MeeGo platform in 2011, but that it would devote fewer resources to future development of the platform, and would phase out Symbian entirely. Aligning with Microsoft had been considered a possibility by analysts, due to Elop's prior employment with the company.

As Nokia was the largest mobile phone and smartphone manufacturer worldwide at the time, it was suggested the alliance would help Windows Phone, but from the beginning of 2011, until 2013, Nokia fell from #1 to #10 in smartphone sales. In June 2011, Nokia was overtaken by Apple as the world's biggest smartphone maker by volume. In Q2 2011, amid falling sales, Nokia posted a loss of €368 million, after having realized a profit of €227 million in Q2 2010. In September 2011, Nokia announced it would cut another 3,500 jobs worldwide, including the closure of its Cluj factory in Romania, after having cut as many as 7,000 the previous April. In August 2011 Chris Weber, head of Nokia's subsidiary in the U.S., stated that "The reality is if we are not successful with Windows Phone, it doesn't matter what we do [elsewhere]. He further added, North America is a priority for Nokia […] because it is a key market for Microsoft. On 26 October 2011, Nokia unveiled its first Windows Phone 7-based devices, the high-end Lumia 800 and the mid-range Lumia 710, at its Nokia World conference. After this announcement, Nokia's share price fell about 14%, its biggest drop since July 2009. Nokia's smartphone sales, which had been increasing, collapsed.

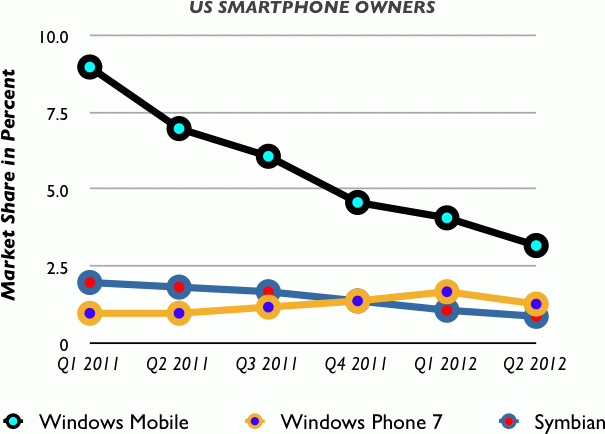
Market share of Symbian, Windows Mobile and Windows Phone 7 among US smartphone owners from Q1 2011 to Q2 2012 according to Nielsen Company

Nokia reported sales "well above 1 million" of its Lumia line in 2011, 2 million sales for the first quarter of 2012, and 4 million for the second quarter of 2012, when Nokia sold only 600,000 smartphones (Symbian and Windows Phone 7) in North America. By comparison, Nokia had sold more than 30 million Symbian devices worldwide in Q4 2010 and the Nokia N8 alone had sold almost 4 million in its first quarter. In Q2 2012, 26 million iPhones and 105 million Android phones shipped, compared to only 6.8 million devices with Symbian and 5.4 million with Windows Phone. In announcing an alliance with Groupon, Elop declared, "The competition... is not with other device manufacturers, it's with Google." In June 2012, Nokia chairman Risto Siilasmaa told journalists that Nokia had a contingency plan in the event that Windows Phone failed, but did not specify what it was.

On 8 February 2012, Nokia announced 4,000 layoffs at smartphone manufacturing plants in Europe by the end of 2012, to move assembly closer to component suppliers in Asia. Despite its commitment to the Windows Phone platform, Nokia continued to sell Symbian (particularly the Nokia 808 Pureview) and Asha feature phones, which may have indicated a failure in the smartphone sector. On 14 June 2012, Nokia announced 10,000 layoffs globally by the end of 2013 and that it would shut production and research sites in Finland, Germany, and Canada, in line with continuing losses and the stock price falling to its lowest point since 1996. In total, Nokia laid off 24,500 employees by the end of 2013. On 18 June 2012, Moody's downgraded Nokia's bond rating to junk status. Nokia's CEO admitted that the company's inability to foresee rapid changes in the mobile phone industry was one of the major reasons for the problems. On 4 May 2012, a group of Nokia investors filed a class action against the company, as a result of disappointing sales. On 22 August 2012, it was reported that a group of Finnish Nokia investors were considering gathering signatures for the removal of Elop as CEO. In December 2012, to cut costs during a period of falling revenues, Nokia announced that it would be selling its headquarters, Nokia House, for €170 million, and leasing the use of it back long-term.

In January 2013, Nokia reported sales of 6.6 million smartphones for Q4 2012, consisting of 2.2 million Symbian and 4.4 million Lumia devices (Windows Phone 7 and 8). In North America, only 700,000 mobile phones were sold, including smartphones. In May 2013, Nokia released the Asha platform for its low-end smartphone devices. The Verge commented that this might have been recognition on the part of Nokia that Windows Phones weren't selling at the bottom end of the smartphone market fast enough and that they might be "hedging their commitment" to the Windows Phone platform. In the same month, Nokia announced its partnership with the world's largest cellular operator, China Mobile, to offer Nokia's new Windows-based phone, the Lumia 920, as the Lumia 920T, an exclusive Chinese variant. The partnership was a bid by Nokia to connect with China Mobile's 700 million-person customer base.

Following the second quarter of 2013, Nokia reported an operating loss of €115 million (£98.8 million), with revenues falling 24% to €5.7 billion, despite Lumia's sales figures exceeding those of BlackBerry's handsets during the same period. Over the nine-quarters prior to the second quarter of 2013, Nokia sustained €4.1 billion worth of operating losses. The company experienced particular problems in both China and the U.S.; in the former, Nokia's handset revenues were the lowest since 2002, while in the U.S., "Nokia continues to show no signs of recovery in the US market. High investments, high expectations, low results." In July 2013, Nokia announced that Lumia sales were 7.4 million for the second quarter of the year – a record high, but Windows Phones in general still lacked momentum and lacked global market share, although scoring progressively better than other competing mobile platforms such as BlackBerry.

In June 2013, despite Nokia's falling commitment to the Windows Phone platform, Nokia's share of that market was a dominant 83.3% of all such phones sold; and by October 2013, Nokia's Lumia line held over a 90% market share of all Windows Phones in use. A part of the reason Nokia couldn't make a profit was that their low priced Nokia Lumia 520 dominated the market while high-end models barely sold.

=== 2013–2014: Acquisition of Nokia's mobile phone business ===
On 2 September 2013, Microsoft announced that it would acquire Nokia's mobile device business in a deal worth €3.79 billion, along with another €1.65 billion to license Nokia's portfolio of patents for 10 years; a deal totaling over €5.4 billion. Steve Ballmer considered the purchase to be a "bold step into the future" for both companies, primarily as a result of its recent collaboration. It was also part of Ballmer's long-term vision of transforming Microsoft into a "devices and services" company. Pending regulatory approval, the acquisition was originally expected to close in early 2014. In an interview published in Helsingin Sanomat, former Nokia executive Anssi Vanjoki commented that the Microsoft deal was "inevitable" due to the "failed strategy" of Stephen Elop.

In an Helsingin Sanomat interview from 2018, Nokia chairman Risto Siilasmaa revealed that Microsoft were also in talks to purchase HTC, another Windows Phone vendor, before they opted to purchase the Nokia business.

In March 2014, it was announced that the acquisition of Nokia's mobile phone business would not be completed by the end of March as expected, but instead was delayed until April of that year due to problems with regulators in Asia. The acquisition of Nokia's mobile phone business by Microsoft was closed on 25 April 2014 for "slightly more" than the originally stated €5.44 billion. Nokia's mobile phone assets became a part of Microsoft Mobile, a new subsidiary of Microsoft based in Finland.

While Microsoft licensed the Nokia brand under a 10-year agreement, Nokia agreed not to use its name on smartphones and to be subject to a non-compete clause preventing it from producing any mobile devices under the Nokia name through 31 December 2015. Microsoft acquired the Asha and Lumia brands as part of the deal, a license to use the Nokia name, as well as the Nokia PureView, ClearBlack, Surge, Mural, and Symbian-related trademarks. Further, the deal included the acquisition of 8,500 design-related patents by Microsoft, and license on 30,000 "utility" patents on a non-exclusive basis for 10 years.

As part of the deal, a number of Nokia executives joined Microsoft: Stephen Elop became the head of Microsoft's devices team (which oversees products such as Xbox and Surface); Risto Siilasmaa replaced Elop as interim CEO, before the appointment of Rajeev Suri.

On 17 July 2014, it was reported that a major round of layoffs, totaling over 18,000 across the entire company, would occur at Microsoft over the following year. The majority of these layoffs were related to the integration of Nokia's former staff into Microsoft, in an effort to reduce redundancy. It was also reported that Microsoft had ended future development of Nokia's Asha, Series 40, and X lines, in favor of focusing exclusively on Windows Phone.

Shortly after the acquisition, Microsoft discontinued Nokia's smartwatch prototype, codenamed "Moonraker", dropping it in favour of the Microsoft Band.

=== 2014–2017: As a subsidiary of Microsoft, rebranding from Nokia to Microsoft, divestment and closure ===
==== 2014 ====
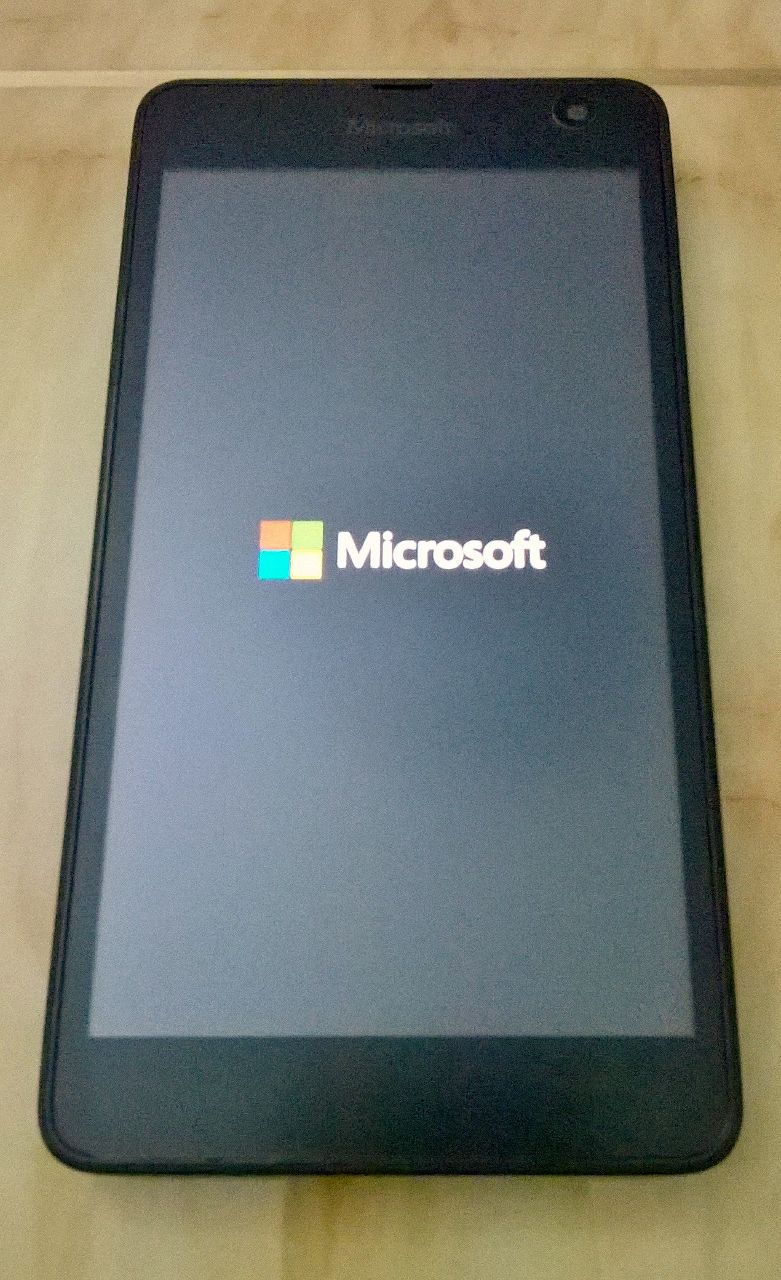
Microsoft Lumia 535, the first Microsoft branded Lumia device

Rebranding started in 2014. In March 2014, Nokia Mail and Nokia Chat were closed, offering migration services to Microsoft's Outlook.com and Skype until April 2015. All Nokia accounts were closed on 25 April 2015. Most of Nokia's social media sites were rebranded as Microsoft Lumia rather than Microsoft Mobile, to emphasize their focus on Windows Phone as opposed to other Nokia mobile phones. Windows Phone social network pages were rebranded as well, Nokia Conversations being rebranded as Lumia Conversations, and NokNok.tv as Lumia Conversations UK.

The rebranding was not entirely consistent, as the Nokia Army, launched in 2012, became the Spartan Nation. The support site for legacy phones, accessories, as well as other Nokia-branded devices and services, Nokia Discussions, was renamed the Microsoft Mobile Community. In July 2014, it was reported by evleaks that Microsoft was attempting to license the Nokia name in a co-branding scheme, which would have seen future devices branded as "Nokia by Microsoft". After the acquisition of Nokia's mobile device business by Microsoft, several Lumia devices were unveiled by Microsoft Mobile in September 2014 that still carried the Nokia name, including the Lumia 830 and Lumia 735. Nokia's mobile applications retained by Microsoft were rebranded as "Lumia".

In September 2014, Microsoft announced Windows 10 operating system, a common platform for smartphones, tablets, laptops and Xbox. It was made available for their Lumia line of smartphones. Due to the position of Microsoft Lumia devices being first-party hardware by Microsoft, Lumia handsets were the first to receive the Windows Insider preview.

In October 2014, Microsoft announced that future Lumia devices would be branded with the "Microsoft" name and logo rather than "Nokia". In November 2014, Microsoft announced its first self branded phone, Microsoft Lumia 535. In November 2014 The Lumia Beta Apps division launched the Lumia Cinemagraph Beta which migrated content from Nokia's website to Microsoft OneDrive and subsequently implemented this feature in Lumia Cinemagraph. Previously cinemagraphs used to be synchronized via the Nokia Memories site, the change was made in relation to migrating all content from Nokia's sites to Microsoft's services.

In December 2014, Microsoft discontinued the Nokia Sync service, which used Nokia's account service to synchronize contacts and general phone information, in favour of other offerings such as Microsoft OneDrive, which uses Microsoft accounts as part of the transition from Nokia accounts to Microsoft accounts.

==== 2015–2017 ====
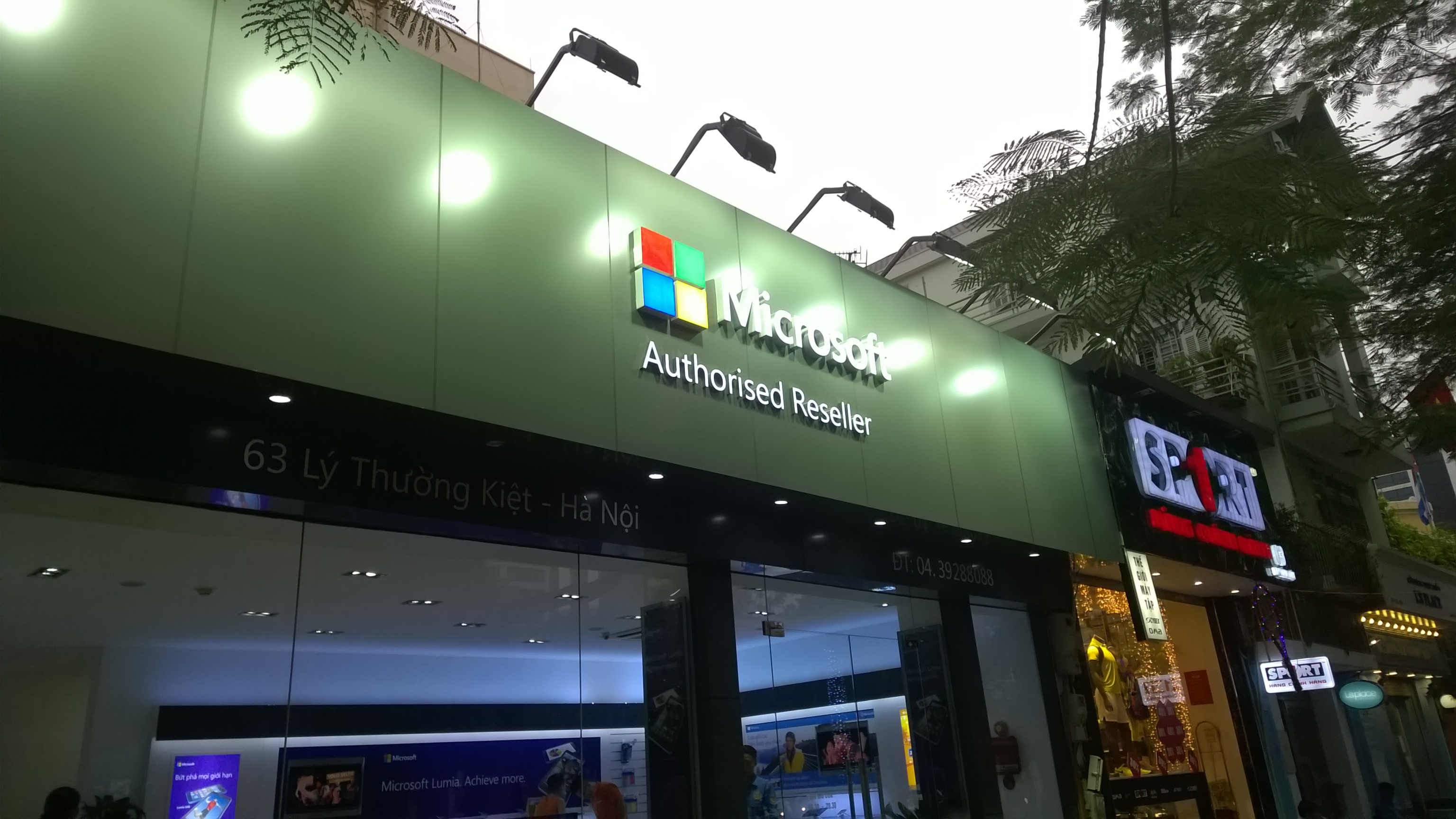
A Microsoft Authorised Reseller Store in Hanoi, Vietnam

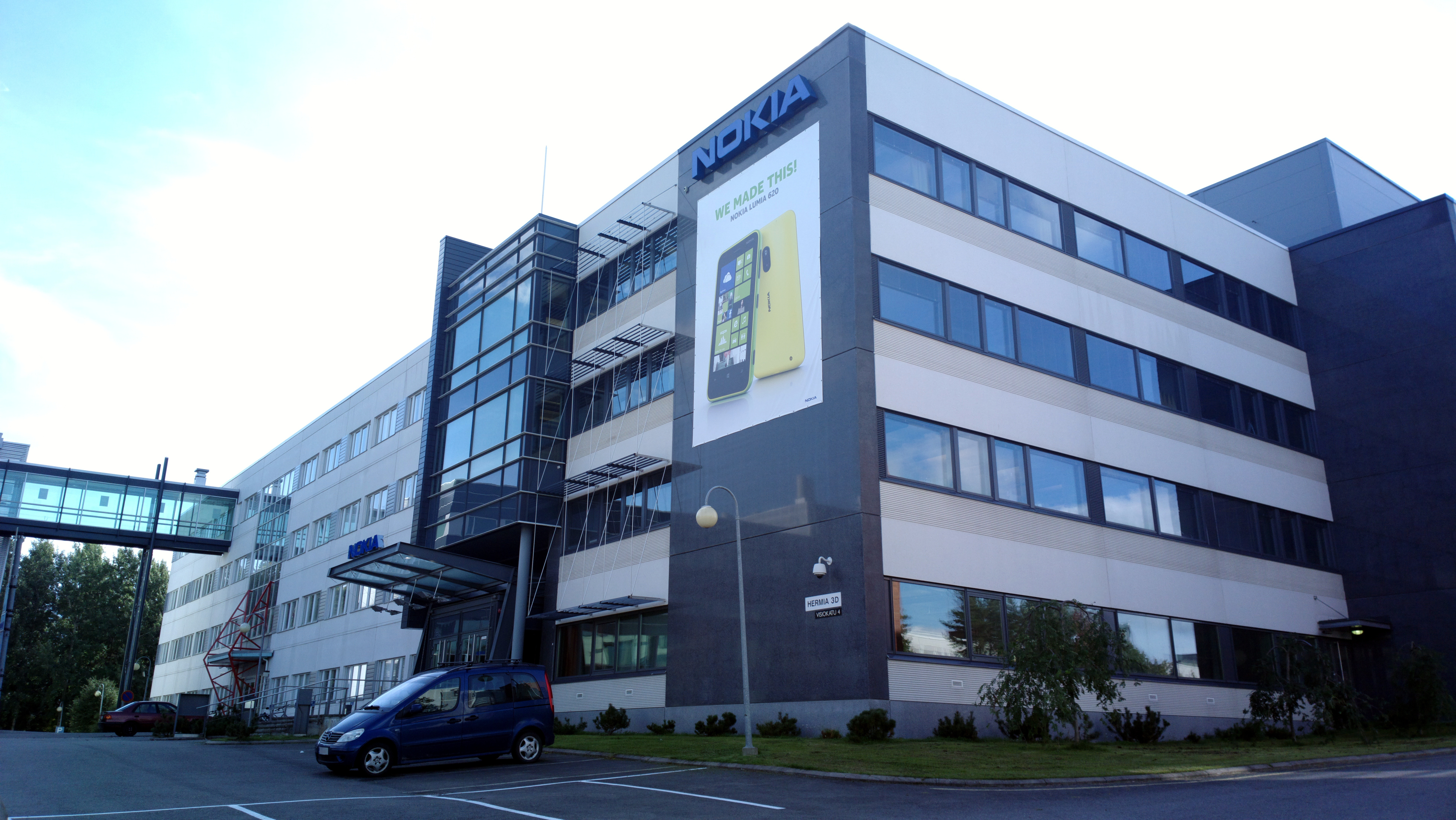
Microsoft Mobile office building in Hervanta, Tampere, Finland

To compete in developing markets, Microsoft launched various low- and mid-range devices—such as the Lumia 430 Dual SIM, 532, 435, 640, 640 XL, and 540 Dual SIM—to boost Windows Phone sales and increase market share. In Q2 2015, Lumia sold 10.5 million devices, compared to 8.2 million during the same quarter in the prior year. As a consequence of the Microsoft Lumia 535 being as popular as its predecessor, the Nokia Lumia 520, in key markets such as India and Brazil, Microsoft would not concentrate on releasing a high end Microsoft Lumia device until the launch of Windows 10. In Q2 2015, feature phone sales declined year-over-year, with a total of 40 million being sold for a total revenue of $2.28 billion, and a gross margin of $330 million (14%), being significantly lower than previous years due to a global decline in the demand for feature phones in favour of smartphones.

In June 2015, Stephen Elop was fired by Satya Nadella, and Stephen Elop finally left Microsoft.

In Q3 2015, Lumia sales increased 6.5% over the previous year, a total of 8.6 million Lumia handsets being sold (an 18% increase). But with declining sales of 25.7 million non-Lumia phones, Q3 2015 showed a decline overall. Despite the increased Lumia sales, costs exceeded sales revenue by $4 million, and Microsoft posted a loss of 12 cents per phone sold. In February 2015, Microsoft stated that most Lumia devices would be able to upgrade from Windows Phone 8.1 to Windows 10 Mobile. Joe Belfiore said that Microsoft was "working on" a limited version of 10 for low-end devices with 512 MB of RAM, citing the Nokia Lumia 520, which at the time represented 24.5% of all Windows Phone devices sold.

On 28 April 2015, Microsoft opened the first Microsoft Priority Reseller Store, in the Indian city of Gurgaon, Haryana, as a move to rebrand all their Nokia stores worldwide. At the time Microsoft had 15,684 retail outlets and 324 Nokia Care centres. In addition to selling phones, the stores would also offer Surface and Xbox devices. Of India's 8,872 stores only 441 would become priority resellers, while the rest would be rebranded as Microsoft Mobile Reseller stores. On 3 June 2015, Microsoft announced the new Nokia Series 30+ powered Nokia 105 and Nokia 105 Dual SIM devices, which would be primarily marketed to business and travelling users, first-time mobile telephone owners, and as "a back up device" for smartphone owners.

In Q4 2015, Microsoft managed to sell only 19.4 million feature phones, compared to 30.3 million in the prior year. In June 2015, Microsoft took over naming rights to Nokia Theatre L.A. Live, a 7,100-seat concert hall in Los Angeles, renaming it the Microsoft Theatre, supplying and installing new AV equipment, and renovating public spaces. L.A. Live's 40,000-square-foot outdoor plaza would be known as Microsoft Square; and Club Nokia, a 2,300 seat venue in the Plaza, would also be renamed.

On 8 July 2015, Microsoft announced a planned restructuring of Microsoft Mobile, including a $7.6 billion (~$10.1 billion in 2025) write down on the acquisition of Nokia, planned layoffs of up to 7,800 jobs, and a plan to downsize its first-party smartphone business, releasing fewer devices per year and pulling out of underperforming markets. New Microsoft CEO Satya Nadella stated that the company planned to have a "more effective and focused phone portfolio", and aimed to "create a vibrant Windows ecosystem including our first-party device family." In October 2015, Microsoft announced the first Lumia devices running on Windows 10 Mobile, the Lumia 950, 950 XL, and 550, the first two being high-end devices, the latter a budget phone.

In February 2016, the Lumia 650, which runs on Windows 10 Mobile, was launched. It was primarily targeted towards mid-range consumers.

In April 2016, it was revealed that 2.3 million Lumia devices were sold in the previous quarter, a major drop compared to 2015. The rapidly falling sales, coupled with Windows Phone market share dropping below 1%, led to Microsoft announcing on 23 May the "streamlining" of the business. It would lay off "up to 1,850 jobs worldwide", with up to 1,350 of those in Finland. The company also wrote off US$900 million from the Nokia acquisition. Microsoft planned to complete most of these job cuts by the end of 2016, with the rest being completed by July 2017. The company stated that it would continue to develop Windows 10 Mobile, support existing Lumia and future third-party devices (implicating that it would no longer produce new Lumia models), and "embrace other mobile platforms with our productivity services".

The same month, Microsoft sold its Nokia feature phone business and Nokia brand to HMD Global, a Finnish startup backed by former Nokia executives. The Foxconn subsidiary FIH Mobile acquired a factory in Vietnam, as well as other distribution and manufacturing assets, from Microsoft Mobile as well. HMD and FIH announced that they would collaborate on developing and manufacturing new devices under the Nokia trademark (having reached a new 10-year license for the brand, and the Android-based Nokia 6 smartphone as its first device), with input from Nokia on design and incorporation of its technologies. FIH Mobile continued to produce Microsoft-branded Lumia phones until December 2019.

In October 2017, Microsoft executive Joe Belfiore revealed that Microsoft would no longer develop new phone hardware, and that Windows 10 Mobile would only receive maintenance releases and patches from then on, citing its low market share and Microsoft's abandonment of its mobile business. Microsoft would later attempt to revive their phone business with the Android-based Surface Duo, which was also met by failure. After 2022, Microsoft no longer makes or supports mobile devices, with the Nokia phone business fully spun off to Nokia Mobile (now HMD), and related services have been phased out. Microsoft has since been promoting their Phone Link app on Windows for use on Samsung Galaxy devices, with Bill Gates now using a Galaxy. Steve Ballmer was caught that use iPhone after he retired from Microsoft and after the closure of Microsoft Mobile.

== Hardware products ==
=== Lumia ===
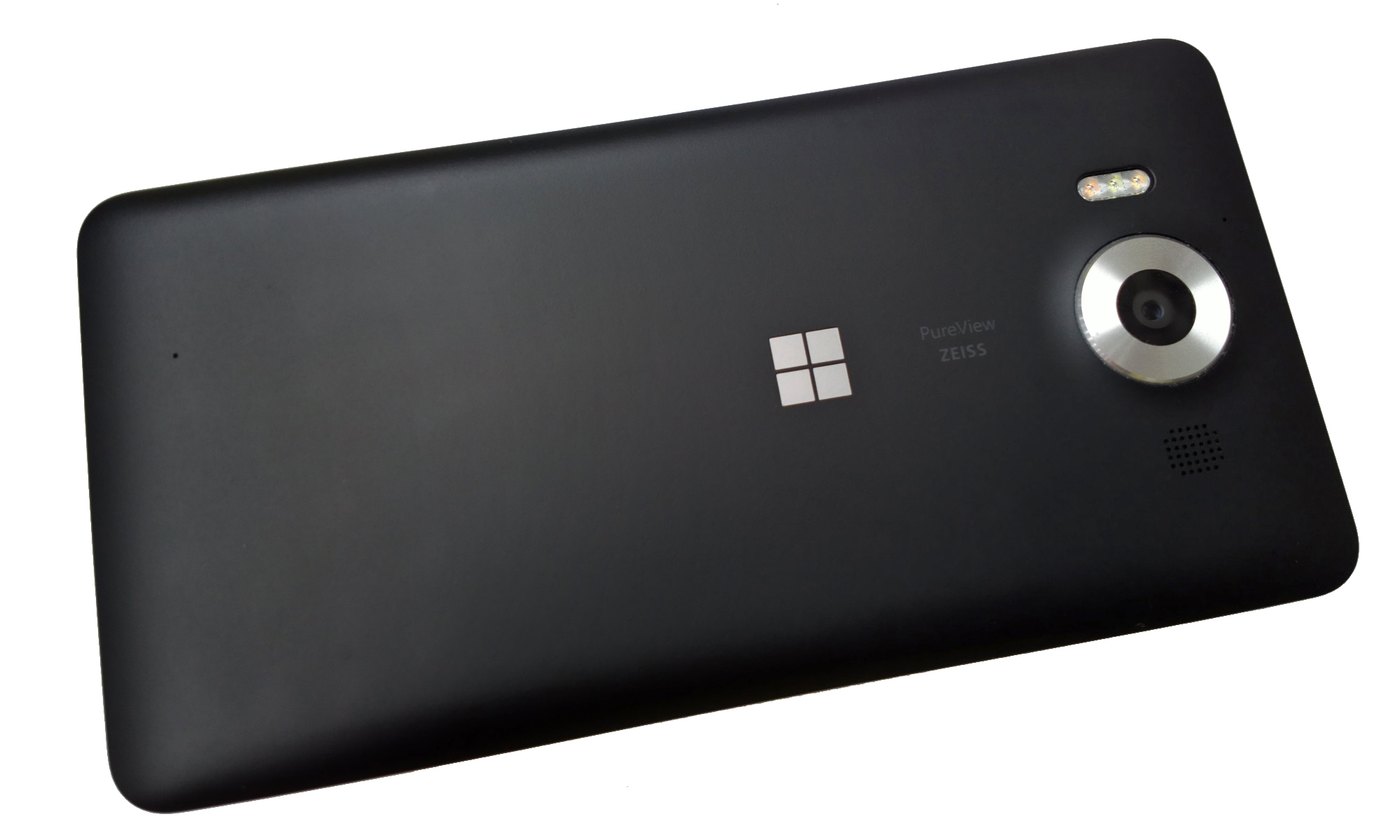
Lumia 950

Lumia was a line of touchscreen smartphones and, previously, tablet computers, introduced in November 2011. All Lumia mobile telephones run on the Windows Phone operating system. The only Lumia tablet Lumia 2520, running Windows RT, was introduced in November 2013 and has been discontinued. The Lumia is Microsoft's flagship phone portfolio.

In October 2014, Microsoft officially announced that it would phase out the Nokia brand in its promotion and production of Lumia smartphones, and that future Lumia models would be branded solely with the name and logo of Microsoft. In November 2014, Microsoft announced its first self-branded phone, Microsoft Lumia 535. Rebranding the Lumia line from "Nokia" to "Microsoft" did not affect sales, though some critics believed that the change might influence consumers' decisions due to Nokia being an established phone brand, compared to Microsoft.

In October 2015, Microsoft announced the first Lumia devices running on Windows 10 Mobile platform, the Lumia 950, Lumia 950 XL, and Lumia 550. In addition. Microsoft stated that most Lumia devices would be able to upgrade from Windows Phone 8/8.1 to Windows 10, from December 2015.

In October 2017, Microsoft executive Joe Belfiore revealed that Microsoft would no longer develop new phone hardware, and that Windows 10 Mobile would only receive maintenance releases and patches from then on, citing its low market share and Microsoft's abandonment of its mobile business.

For its Microsoft Lumia series Microsoft Mobile created such exclusive content as the Lumia imaging apps (that make use of the PureView technology on higher end Lumia devices) and new software was often tested through the Lumia Beta Apps. The 2024 HMD Skyline has been compared to a revival of the Lumia line, though using stock Android instead of Windows Phone.

=== Nokia X ===
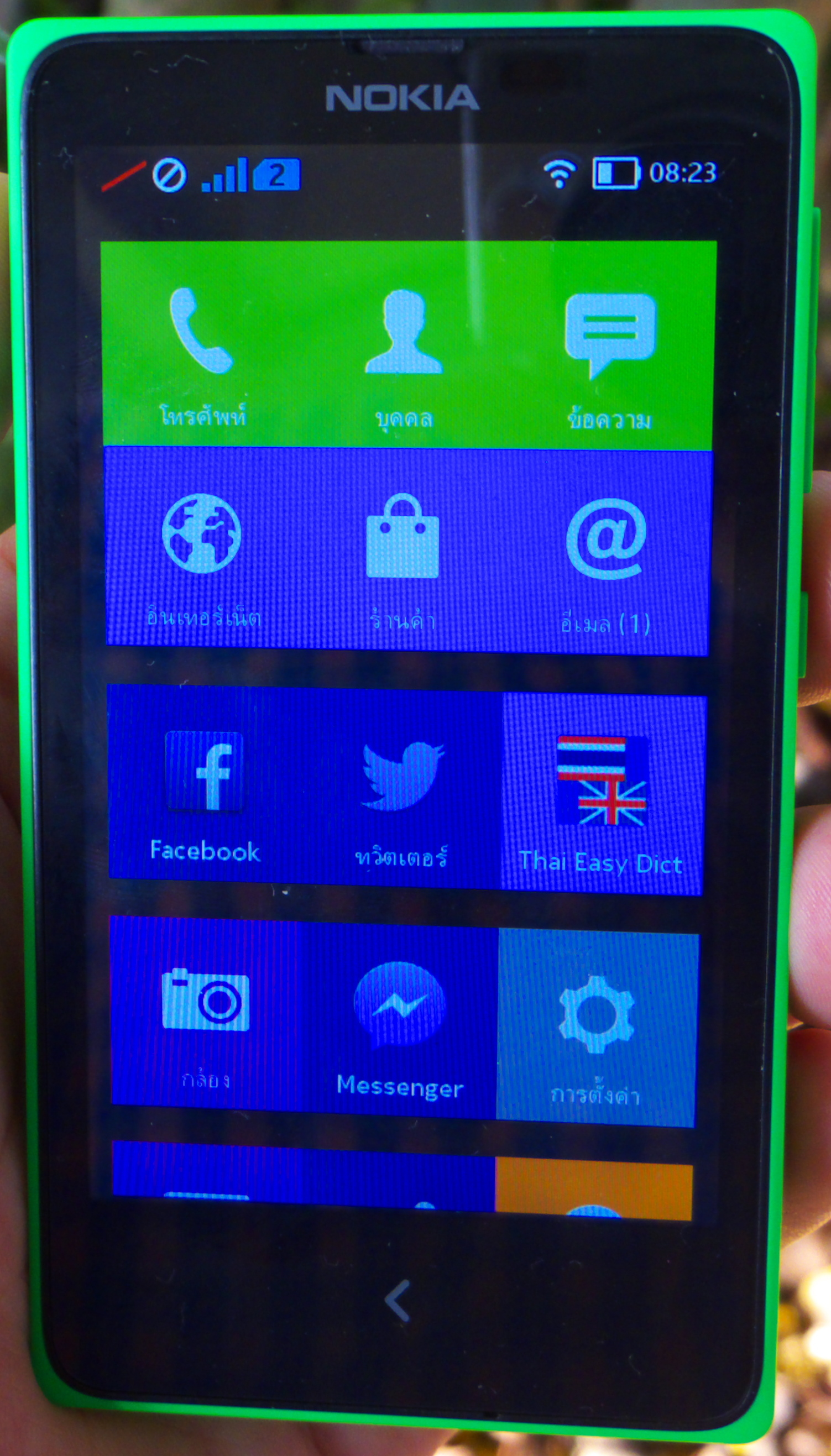
The Nokia X

In mid-September 2013, a media report revealed that Nokia tested the Android operating system on both its Lumia and Asha hardware. On 11 December 2013, a report showed that development of the Asha-like device, codenamed "Normandy", was continuing, despite the finalisation of Nokia's acquisition by Microsoft. In February 2014, in Barcelona, Spain, the Nokia X family was unveiled at Mobile World Congress. These devices, which were aimed towards emerging markets, run a modified version of Android known as Nokia X Software Platform, which was aligned towards Microsoft services and did not use Google Play Store. In a company memo released in July 2014, it was announced that, as part of cutbacks, Microsoft would end the Asha, Series 40, and X range entirely, in favor of solely producing and encouraging the use of Windows Phone products. The X series branding was later reused by HMD for their high end Android phones, (such as the Nokia XR20) but they do not use the X platform and are no different from stock Android,

=== Asha ===
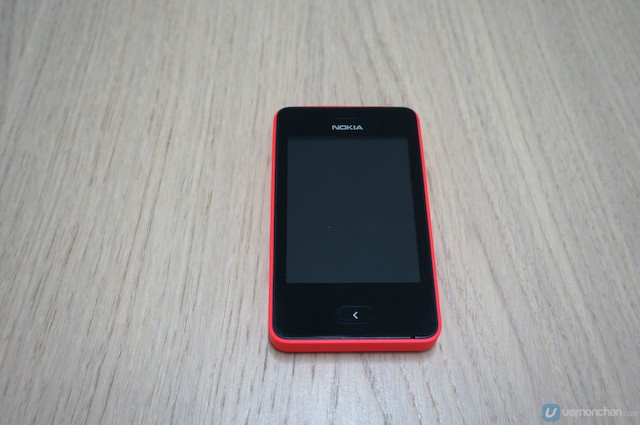
Nokia Asha 501

The Asha series consisted of feature phones and low-end smartphones targeted mainly at emerging markets. The series has a mixture of full-touchscreen, "touch and type", QWERTY, and traditional T9-keypad devices. Originally, the Asha devices ran on Nokia's veteran operating system Series 40. Nokia later created the Asha platform as a result of their acquisition of Smarterphone. In May 2013, the Asha 501 became the first device running under the new OS, and all new Ashas since have been running on the new Asha platform. During the July 2014 job cuts and restructuring at Microsoft, these device lines were moved to "maintenance mode", and would be discontinued, along with Nokia X and Series 40, in favour of solely producing Windows Phone products.

=== Series 40 ===
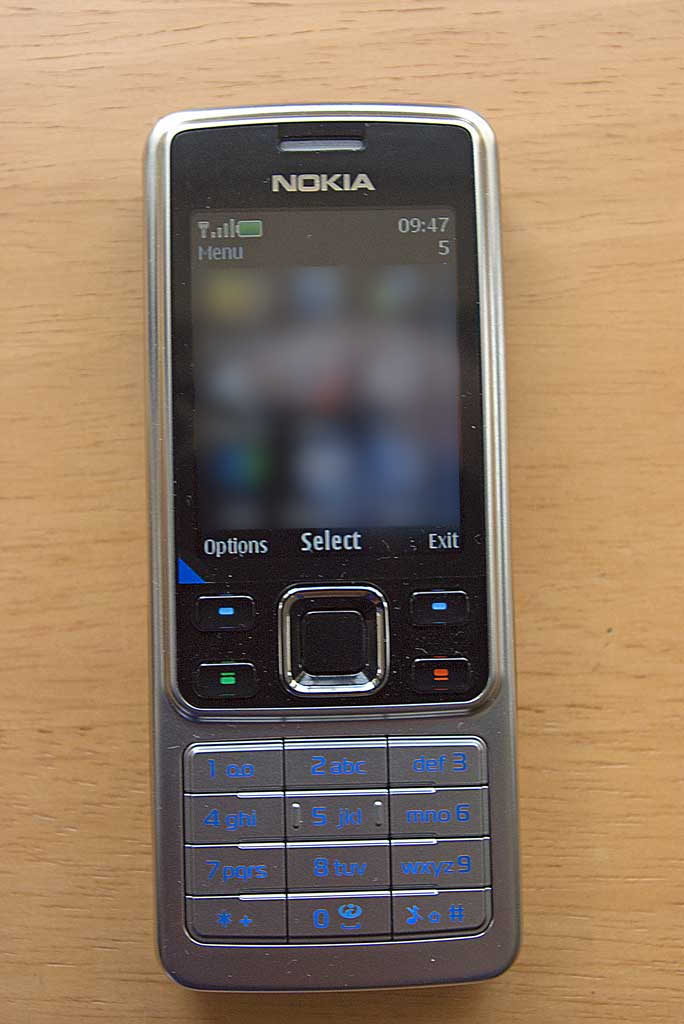
Nokia 6300

Series 40, or S40, was a software platform and user interface (UI) based on Java used for Nokia's broad range of mid-tier feature phones, as well as on some of the Vertu line of luxury phones. It was one of the world's most widely used mobile phone platforms. On 25 January 2012, Nokia announced that the company had sold over 1.5 billion Series 40 devices. Although S40 has more features than the Series 30 platform, it was not used for smartphones, where Nokia primarily used Windows Phone and, until 2012, Symbian. However, in 2012 and 2013, several Series 40 phones from the Asha line, such as the 308, 309, and 311, were advertised as "smartphones" although they did not support smartphone features like multitasking or a full-fledged HTML browser. In July 2014, it was announced that Microsoft would discontinue Series 40. It was replaced by S30+, which was not compatible with J2ME apps.

=== Series 30+ ===
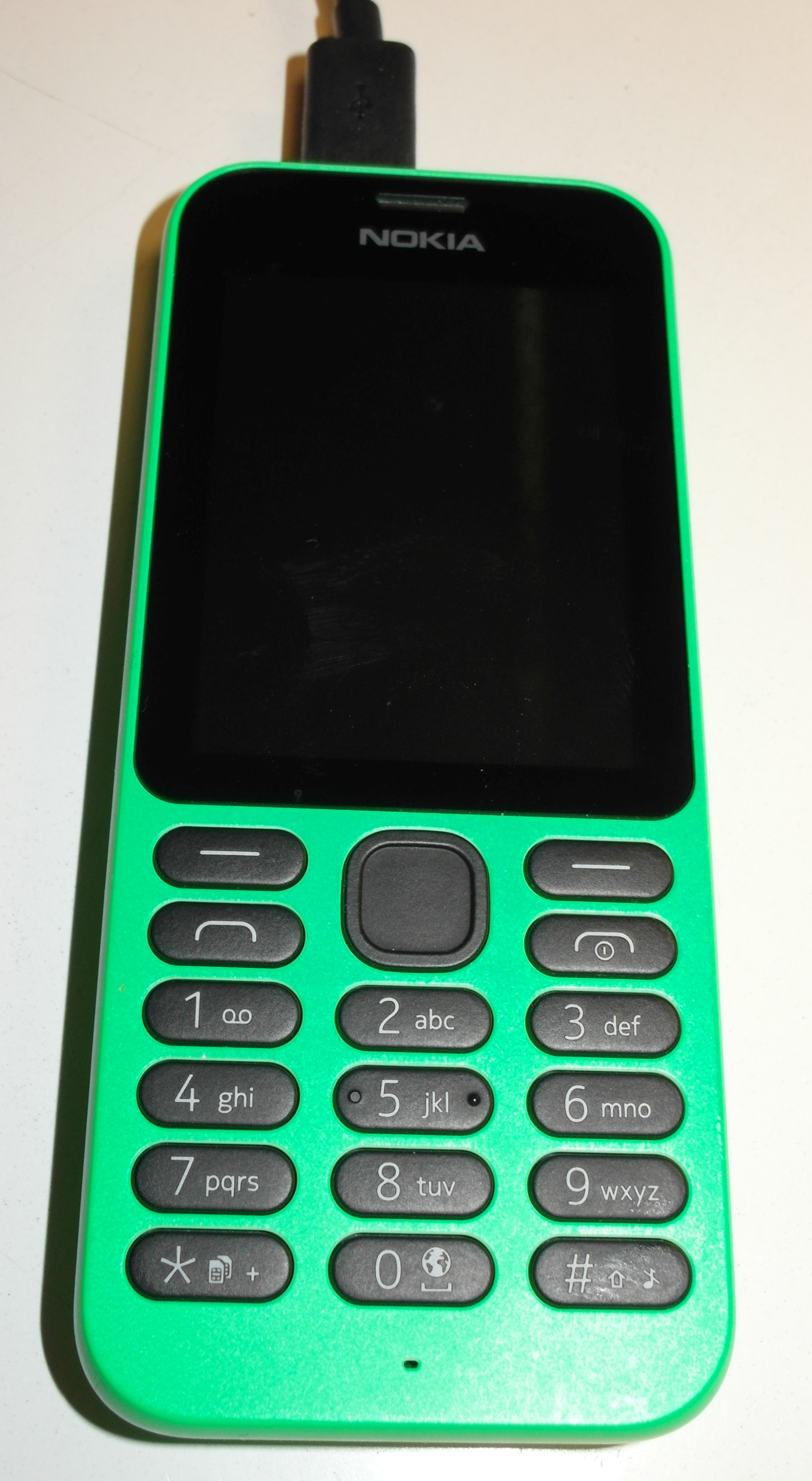
The Nokia 215, which runs on the Series 30+ platform

Series 30+ is a software platform and user interface that was used by Microsoft Mobile for its entry-level mobile devices. The first Series 30+ device was the Nokia 130, which had basic features such as a flashlight, FM radio, USB charging, video playback from microSD cards, and Bluetooth and USB connectivity, but no internet access. The Nokia 215, released in 2014, allowed users to browse the internet with Bing and MSN Weather and came pre-installed with Opera Mini. Most S30+ devices did not come with Wi-Fi and were marketed for developing nations, with the Nokia 105 making up the majority of sales. In June 2015, Microsoft further expanded the line of Nokia-branded feature phones with the Nokia 105 aimed specifically at developing nations, and named after an earlier model with the same target audience, but marketed also towards present smartphone owners, being "perfect for those looking to own their first mobile phone or for those needing a reliable back-up phone for travel and fun." In the third quarter of 2015, the Nokia 222 was released. It featured a larger, 2.4-inch screen. In December 2015, the Nokia 230 was the last Nokia phone from Microsoft. It had an aluminium body, a 2 megapixel front-facing camera, and a dedicated selfie camera key. Series 30+ still lives today as part of HMD Global.

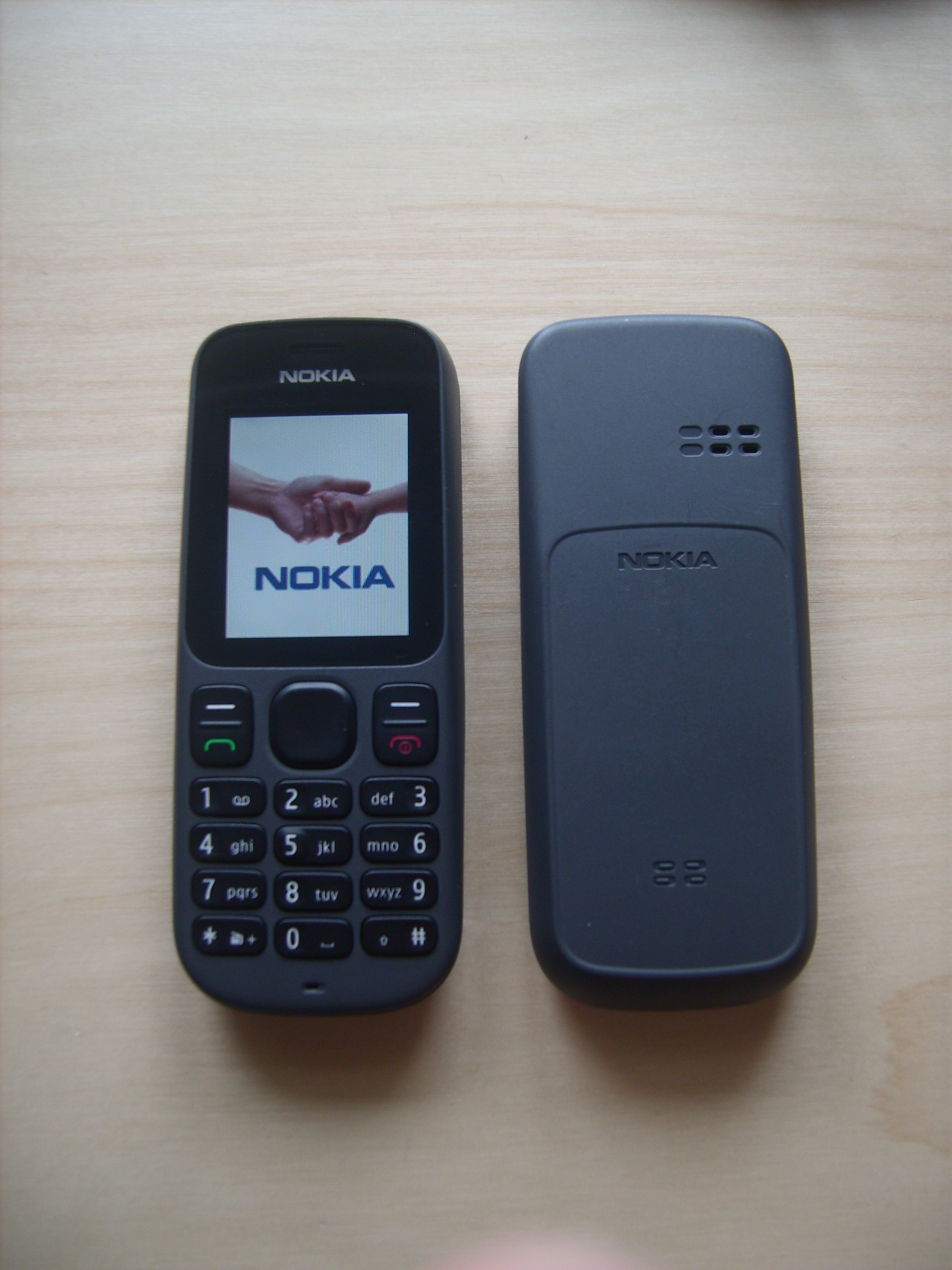
Nokia 100

=== Series 30 ===
Series 30, or S30, was a software platform and user interface created by Nokia for its entry-level mobile devices. S30 phones are not capable of running Java apps. By mid 2014, Microsoft discontinued S30 for its Nokia-branded mobile devices.

=== Mobile accessories ===
Besides phones Microsoft Mobile also produces mobile-phone accessories such as the Bluetooth enabled Treasure Tags. In newer devices Microsoft has bundled the Swedish company Colourd's headsets as opposed to first-party hardware. In late 2014, Microsoft launched a portable battery charger called Microsoft Portable Power, succeeded by Microsoft Portable Dual Chargers.

==== Treasure Tag ====
Treasure Tag, originally Nokia Treasure Tag, is an NFC and Bluetooth enabled keychain companion to Lumia devices. When Treasure Tags are attached to small valuables, such as keys or wallets, the Lumia device can show a map to help locate them.

Treasure Tag Mini, originally Nokia Treasure Tag Mini, was launched by Microsoft in 2014 as a successor to the original Treasure Tag. It added support for iOS, Android (including Nokia X devices) and Microsoft feature phones (Such as the Nokia 105). Compared to the original, the Treasure Tag Mini comes in fewer colours, has shorter battery life, lacks NFC capabilities, and has no notification tones.

== Corporate affairs ==
=== Corporate governance ===
When Nokia's devices and services group entered Microsoft's workforce, former Nokia CEO Stephen Elop became the new head of Microsoft Devices, which includes other hardware such as the Surface and Xbox. Elop was joined by Nokia executives Jo Harlow (smart devices), Juha Putkiranta (operations), Timo Toikkanen (feature phones), and Chris Weber (sales and marketing), who gained similar positions at Microsoft. Microsoft Devices retained most of Nokia's groups, including the hardware and studios teams, while software teams were merged with Microsoft's respective teams. The transition worked without much complication, as Elop had previously reorganised Nokia's structure to be similar to Microsoft's.

Many former Nokia executives have joined other projects at Microsoft, an example being Pasi Saarikko who became Principal Hardware Engineering Manager at the Microsoft HoloLens project.

On 17 June 2015, as part of a reorganisation, Microsoft announced that former Nokia executives Stephen Elop, and Jo Harlow would be leaving the company. As part of the structural reorganisation of Microsoft the Devices and Studios group was merged with the Operating Systems group to form the new Windows and Devices group, which is headed by Terry Myerson. Other than Microsoft Lumia, this new engineering group includes Microsoft hardware divisions such as Surface, Band, HoloLens, and Xbox, as well as the Windows operating system.

=== Headquarters ===
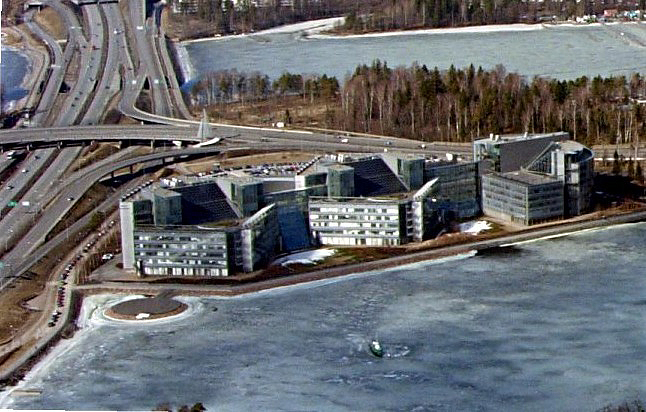
Microsoft Mobile's former head office

Microsoft Mobile's head office was Microsoft Talo in Keilaniemi, Espoo, Finland. The building was previously named Nokia House, and was part of Microsoft's acquisition of Nokia's device business, becoming Microsoft Mobile's headquarters in April 2014 and receiving its new name. It is now occupied by both Microsoft Finland, Tieto and Fortum.

== See also ==
- Nokia
- Microsoft Kin
- Zune HD
- Danger, Inc.
- HMD Global
- Jolla
