= Dolby Headphone =

Technology developed by Lake Technology

Logo

Dolby Headphone is a technology developed by Lake Technology (Australia), that later sold marketing rights to Dolby Laboratories, sometimes referred to as Mobile Surround, which creates a virtual surround sound environment in real-time using any set of two-channel stereo headphones. It takes as input either a 5.1 or a 7.1 channel signal, a Dolby Pro Logic II encoded 2 channel signal (from which 5 or 7 channels can be derived) or a stereo 2 channel signal. It sends as output a 2 channel stereo signal that includes audio cues intended to place the input channels in a simulated virtual soundstage.

== Technology ==
Head-related transfer functions (HRTFs) are used to generate positional audio cues in the two-channel output signal. A finite impulse response (FIR) filter is used to process the audio with lower latency.

== Applications ==
Dolby Headphone is supported by various netbooks, including the Lenovo IdeaPad S10-2 and the Acer Aspire One. Certain Asus Xonar soundcards also have Dolby Headphone support, including Asus Xonar models: D1, D2/PM, DX, D2X, DG, HDAV1.3, ST, STX, STX II, Xense and U3. PowerDVD Ultra 9 also supports Dolby Headphone when certain options are set in the "Settings" menu but PowerDVD is not marketed as an official product of Dolby Headphone.

Several Nokia smartphones such as the Nokia N9 officially support Dolby Headphone, and the technology is also supported in the new version of the Nokia Belle Feature Pack 1. The functionality is either pre-installed or is available as an update for the Nokia 603, 700, 701 and 808 Pureview, and is included on many models in the Lumia series including the 810, 820, 920 and 1020.

The technology has since been replaced by "Dolby Atmos For Headphones", which mainly adds the extra simulation required for the Atmos surround channels to the pre-existing technology. This converts the technology into full Binaural surround.

== Uses ==
Dolby Headphone is incorporated into the audio decoders packaged with surround headphones including:

- Razer Thresher 7.1
- Razer Thresher Ultimate
- HyperX Cloud Revolver S
- Astro Gaming A40 System
- Astro Gaming A50 System
- Logitech G430
- Logitech G35
- Logitech G930
- Logitech G933
- Logitech G633
- Plantronics GameCom Commander
- Plantronics Gamecom 777
- Plantronics Gamecom 780
- Plantronics GameCom 788
- Plantronics RIG 500E
- Turtle Beach Systems Ear Force DXL1
- Turtle Beach Systems Ear Force X41
- Turtle Beach Systems Ear Force X42
- Turtle Beach Systems Ear Force Recon 320
- Xbox Live Gaming Headset
- Tritton Technologies AX720 Gaming Headset
- Corsair HS1 USB Gaming Headset
- Corsair Void Pro RGB Wireless
- Sennheiser PC 163D
- Sennheiser PC 333D
- Sennheiser PC 363D
- Sennheiser PC 373D
- SteelSeries Siberia Elite Prism
- SteelSeries SteelSeries Siberia 800

== History ==
The headphone virtual surround sound technology was initially developed and marketed by Lake Technology in 1997.

In October 1998, Dolby licensed the headphone surround sound technology from Lake and renamed it 'Dolby Headphone'.

On 23rd Dec 2003, Dolby Laboratories bought over Lake Technology, including the Dolby Headphone technology, for A$21.6 million.
