= Lenovo P780 =

Android-based smartphone

- Manufacturer: Lenovo
- Type: Smartphone
- Series: P Series
- First released: June 15, 2013; 13 years ago
- Related: Lenovo P770
- Compatible networks: GSM 900 / 1800 / 1900 / HSDPA 900 / 2100
- Form factor: Smartphone
- Dimensions: {143mm} H {73mm} W {9.9mm} D
- Weight: 176 g (6 oz)
- Operating system: Android
- CPU: Mediatek MT6589 Quad-core 1.2 GHz Cortex-A7
- GPU: PowerVR SGX544
- Memory: 1 GB RAM
- Storage: 4 GB
- Removable storage: microSD up to 32GB
- Battery: Non-Removable Li-Po 4000 mAh battery
- Rear camera: 8 MP
- Front camera: 0.3 MP
- Display: 5.0 inchesIPS LCD capacitive touchscreen with 720 x 1280 pixels
- Sound: Vibration; MP3, WAV ringtones alert type Loudspeaker; 3.5 mm headphone jack Dolby Headphone sound enhancement
- Connectivity: WiFi 802.11 a/b/g/n, Wi-Fi hotspot NFC; Bluetooth 4.0
- Model: P780
- SAR: Head: 1.39 W/kg 1 g Body: 1.58 W/kg 1 g Hotspot: 0.35 W/kg 1 g
- Website: shop.lenovo.com/ae/en/smartphones/p-series/p780/

Lenovo P780, also known as the IdeaPhone P780, is an Android-based smartphone designed and produced by Lenovo. It has a large lithium polymer battery pack of 4,000mAh and it is dual sim capable.

== Availability ==
Lenovo P780 was available from June 2013 in colors black and white.
