= Nokia Lumia 710 =

Nokia Smartphone from 2011

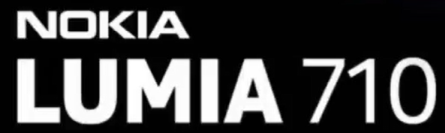

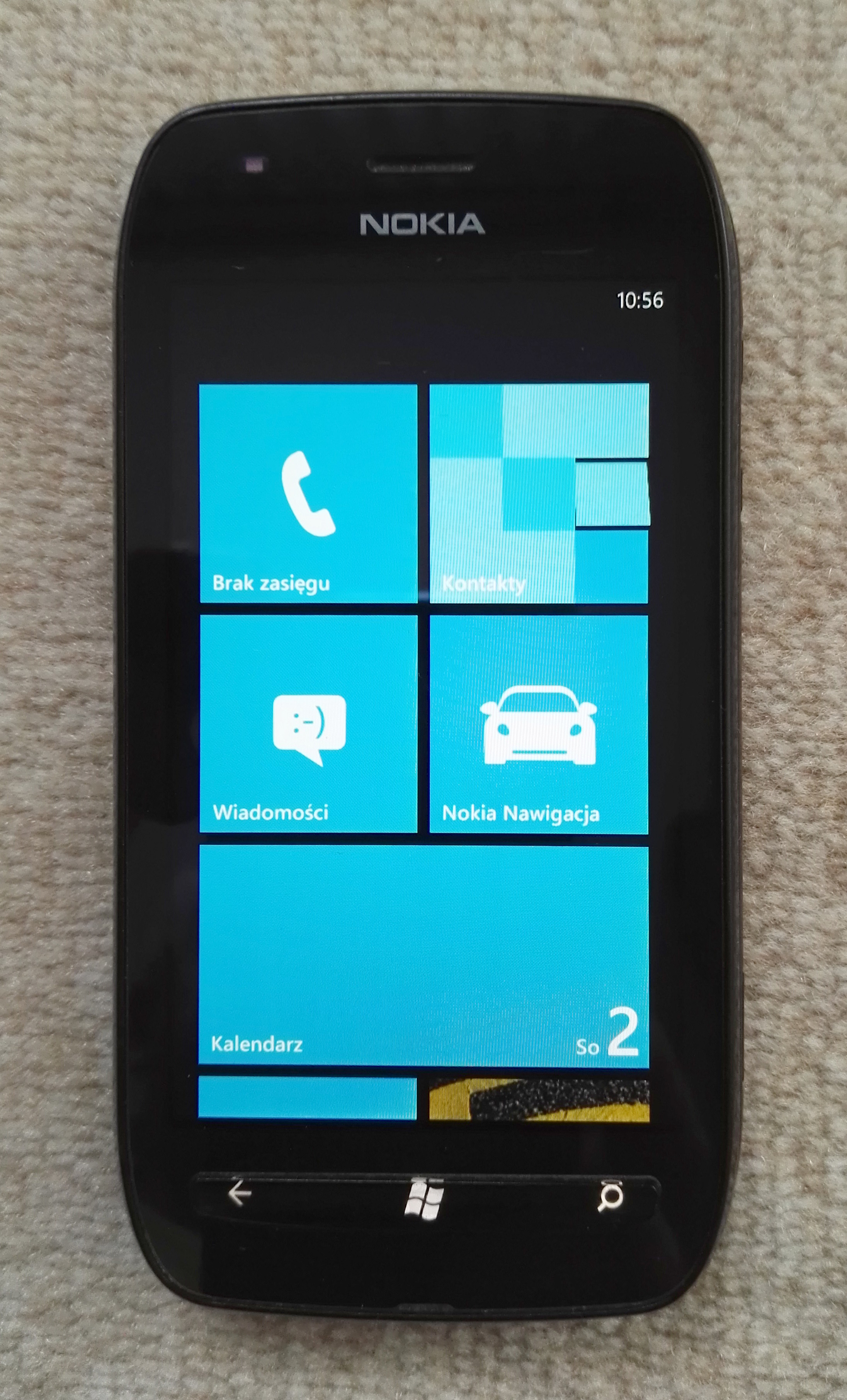
- A Nokia Lumia 710 front view
- Manufacturer: Nokia manufactured in South Korea
- Series: Nokia Lumia Series
- Availability by region: November 2011 (Europe); December 2011 (Asia); January 2012 (USA)
- Discontinued: 2013
- Predecessor: Nokia C7-00; Nokia X7-00; Nokia 700; Nokia 701
- Successor: Nokia Lumia 720
- Related: Nokia 603; Nokia Lumia 610; Nokia Lumia 800; Nokia Lumia 900
- Compatible networks: GSM, HSDPA, Wi-Fi
- Form factor: Slate
- Dimensions: 119 mm (4.7 in) H 62.4 mm (2.46 in) W 12.5 mm (0.49 in) D
- Weight: 126 g (4.4 oz)
- Operating system: Windows Phone 7.5 (can be updated to Windows Phone 7.8, but not to Windows Phone 8)
- System-on-chip: Qualcomm Snapdragon S2 MSM8255
- CPU: 1.4 GHz single-core Qualcomm Scorpion
- GPU: Qualcomm Adreno 205
- Memory: 8 GB internal flash 512 MB ROM; 512 MB RAM
- Removable storage: Not supported
- Battery: Rechargeable BP-3L 3.7V 1300mAh Li-ion battery (up to 400 hrs standby, 6.9 hrs 2G talk time/7.6 hrs 3G talk time)
- Rear camera: 5 MP 2592x1944 pixels, LED flash, autofocus
- Display: 3.7 in. TFT capacitive touchscreen 480x800 px at 252 ppi 16m-color WVGA
- Connectivity: Bluetooth 2.1, 802.11b/g/n, G-Sensor, Digital Compass, A-GPS, micro-USB, 3.5mm audio jack
- Data inputs: Multi-touch capacitive touchscreen, proximity sensor, ambient light sensor, 3-axis accelerometer, digital compass
- Other: micro-SIM
- Website: Nokia Lumia 710

Nokia Lumia 710 is a Windows Phone 7 smartphone. Its release is part of a change in company's direction which has resulted in a shift from Symbian platform towards Windows Phone for smartphones. While the Nokia Lumia 800 and Lumia 900 target the high-end of the smartphone marketplace, the Lumia 610 and Lumia 710 are aimed at the mid-range price point. This generation of Lumia phones ship with Windows Phone 7.5 "Mango". Its design is almost the same as the Symbian Nokia 603, announced just over a week earlier.

It has been released in Brazil and some Western European and Asian countries. On 14 December 2011, T-Mobile and Nokia officially announced their plan to sell the Lumia 710 from 11 January 2012, for $349.99 prepaid or $49.99 with a 2-year contract with minimum of $60 per month plan and $35 per line activation fee. At CES 2012, Nokia announced that Rogers would have exclusivity for the Lumia 710 in Canada. The phone, alongside the Nokia Lumia 800, is promised to get an update to add wi-fi hotspot capabilities.

On 25 February 2013, the Nokia Lumia 720, the successor of the Nokia Lumia 710, was presented. The improvements are Windows Phone 8, dual-core 1 GHz Qualcomm S4 chipset, a front-facing VGA camera, a bigger 4.2 in display, a bigger 2000 mAh battery and support for up to 64 GB microSD cards.

== Hardware ==
The Nokia Lumia 710 can be personalized with exchangeable back covers. It is available in black, white with black, white, cyan, fuchsia and yellow back covers. The device has the same 1.4 GHz processor, hardware acceleration and graphics processor as the Nokia Lumia 800. This phone also features Nokia's ClearBlack display giving it a vivid resolution.

== Software ==
The Lumia 710 comes with four Nokia-exclusive applications not included by default in the Windows Phone OS: Nokia Drive, a free turn-by-turn navigation system; Nokia Maps; Nokia Music, a free streaming music service and music store; and App Highlights, a service suggesting software based on location and operator.

=== Nokia Collection ===
The Windows Phone market place contains a Nokia Collection section. As of April 2012, it contains the following additional applications: Nokia Transport, a location aver public transport schedule and navigation application, Creative Studio, a photo editing application, TuneIn Radio, a local and global radio streaming application, CNN, a news reader and video viewer for then CNN news network, WRC Live, an application to follow live timing and media from the FIA WRC series.

== Model variants ==
Model	RM-803	RM-809
Countries	International	Canada, United States
Carriers/Providers	International	Vidéotron, T-Mobile USA
2G	Quad band GSM/EDGE (850/900/1800/1900 MHz)	
3G	Tri-Band HSDPA 1, 2, 8 (2100/1900/900 MHz)	Quad-Band HSDPA 1, 2, 4, 5 (2100/1900/AWS/850 MHz)
Max network speed	HSDPA: 14,4 Mbit/s	

== Reception ==
The Lumia 710 received mixed reviews, with some critics describing it as an affordable "entry-level" smartphone. CNET gave the phone 3.5 stars out of 5 and said that the 710, "has a smooth and engaging user interface, satisfying photo quality, and 720p HD video, all in a compact and affordable package." CNET UK said, "For a mid-range smart phone, the Nokia Lumia 710 has loads to offer -- it's well built, runs on easy-to-use Windows Phone, and comes with free music, sat-nav and mapping apps."

Some reviewers noted problems with the phone. The device had an issue with disconnecting calls, however, Nokia addressed the problem with a software update. TechRadar said the phone has a poor battery life. PC World said that "The Lumia 710's photos were mediocre." According to TechSpot, "The Lumia 710's button problems don't end with the front of the phone, as the volume rocker and camera key on the right edge are very mushy and don't provide much feedback. The camera key, in particular, is quite hard to use, as it is very difficult to determine when you have pushed it down completely."

== See also ==
- Nokia Lumia 610
- Nokia Lumia 800
- Nokia Lumia 900
