= Nokia 900 =

Nokia 900 may refer to:

- Nokia Lumia 900, a Windows Phone 7-powered smartphone
- Nokia N900, an Internet tablet
