= Nokia 603 =

Multi touch smartphone

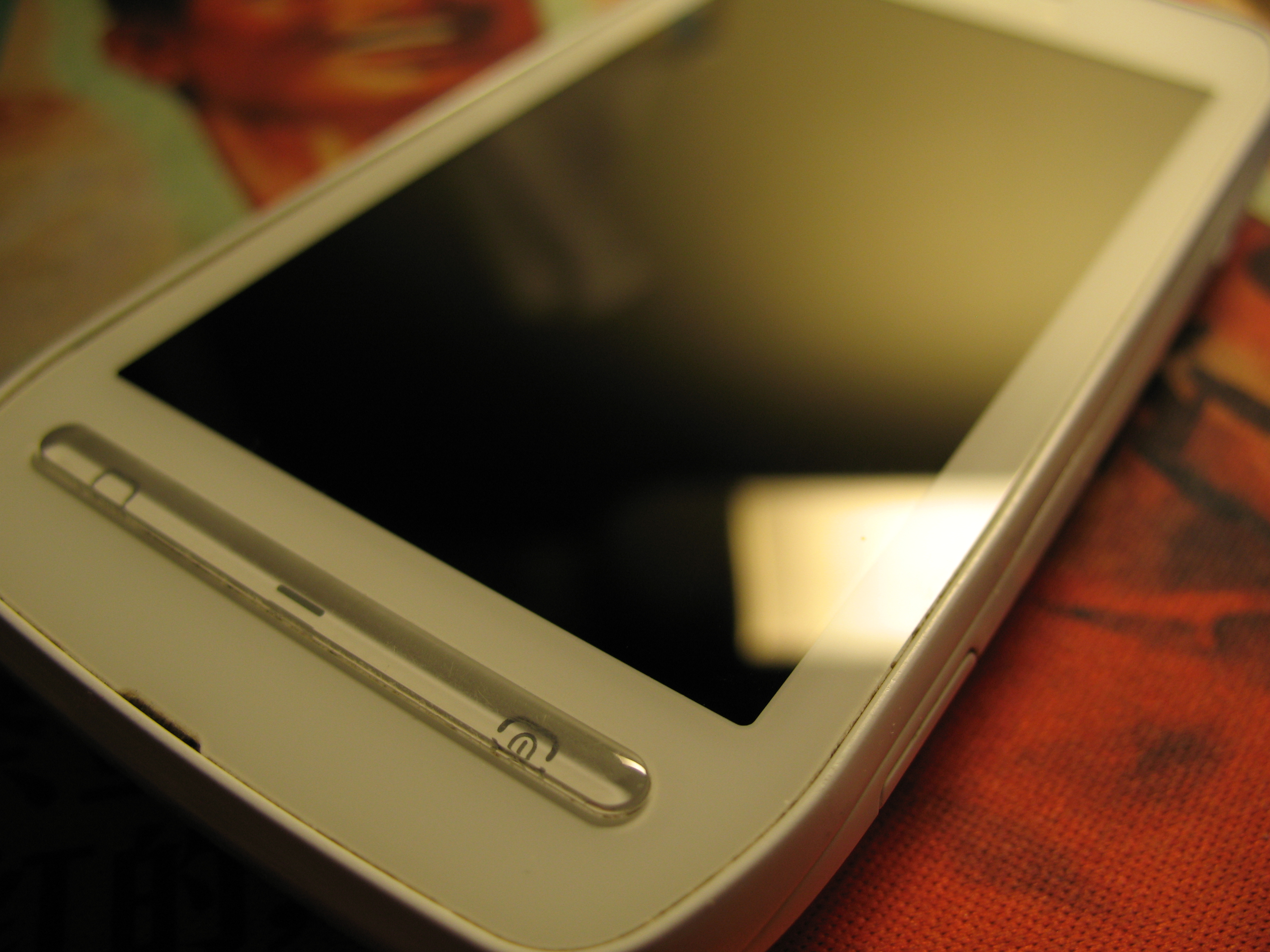
- Manufacturer: Nokia
- Type: Smartphone
- Series: Nokia 3-digit series
- First released: October 2011
- Availability by region: Q4 2011
- Predecessor: Nokia C5-03
- Successor: Nokia Lumia 610
- Related: Nokia 700; Nokia 701; Nokia Lumia 710
- Compatible networks: Quad band GSM 850/900/1800/1900; GPRS, EDGE; Pentaband UMTS (W-CDMA) 850/900/1700/1900/2100; HSDPA 14.4 Mbps; HSUPA 5.76 Mbps
- Form factor: Slate
- Colors: Black, white (with exchangeable back covers in different colors)
- Dimensions: 113.5 mm (4.47 in) H 57.1 mm (2.25 in) W 12.7 mm (0.50 in) D
- Weight: 109.6 g (3.87 oz)
- Operating system: Nokia Belle, upgradeable to Nokia Belle Feature Pack 2
- CPU: ARM11 1 GHz Samsung K5W2G1GACT – AP50 processor
- GPU: Broadcom BCM2763 at 250 MHz with 128 MB RAM
- Memory: 512 MB RAM
- Storage: 2 GB
- Removable storage: microSD, up to 32 GB
- Battery: 1300 mAh Li-ion, removable (Nokia BP-3L)
- Rear camera: 5 megapixels (2592 × 1944 pixels), fixed-focus, 16:9 720p video, 30 FPS
- Display: 640 × 360 px (nHD), 3.5-inch capacitive, multi-touch IPS-LCD with the Nokia ClearBlack technology and Corning Gorilla Glass
- Sound: 3.5 mm jack TRRS connector; Voice command/dial; Active Noise Cancellation; FM radio, Stereo, RDS; Dolby Headphone experience after update to Belle FP1
- Connectivity: Sensors: Accelerometer; Electronic compass; Proximity sensor; Other: Bluetooth 3.0; Wi-Fi 802.11 b/g/n; NFC; USB 2.0 via MicroUSB; USB On-The-Go; UPnP/DLNA Server with Nokia Play; ActiveSync
- Data inputs: Capacitive multi-touch display; Key lock switch and eight keys for power, call creation, menu, call termination, volume up/zoom in, volume down/zoom down, voice recognition, and camera; Virtual keyboard; multiple text-entry options; Two microphones for noise cancellation or stereo recording; GPS with A-GPS
- Other: MicroSIM; Free lifetime voice-guided car and pedestrian navigation (Nokia Maps); Read PDF, Word, Excel, and PowerPoint documents with Quickoffice; Image Capture: Face Detection, Geo-tagging; OpenVG1.1 and OpenGL ES 2.0; Qt 4.7.4; Java; Python

The Nokia 603 is a Symbian-powered smartphone by Nokia. It was announced on 13 October 2011. The device shares its design with the Nokia Lumia 710, a Windows Phone handset, that was introduced shortly after the Nokia 603. The phone comes in black and white with the option of six different-colored back shells, which can be replaced by the user.
