= Nokia Lumia 800 =

Smartphone released in 2011

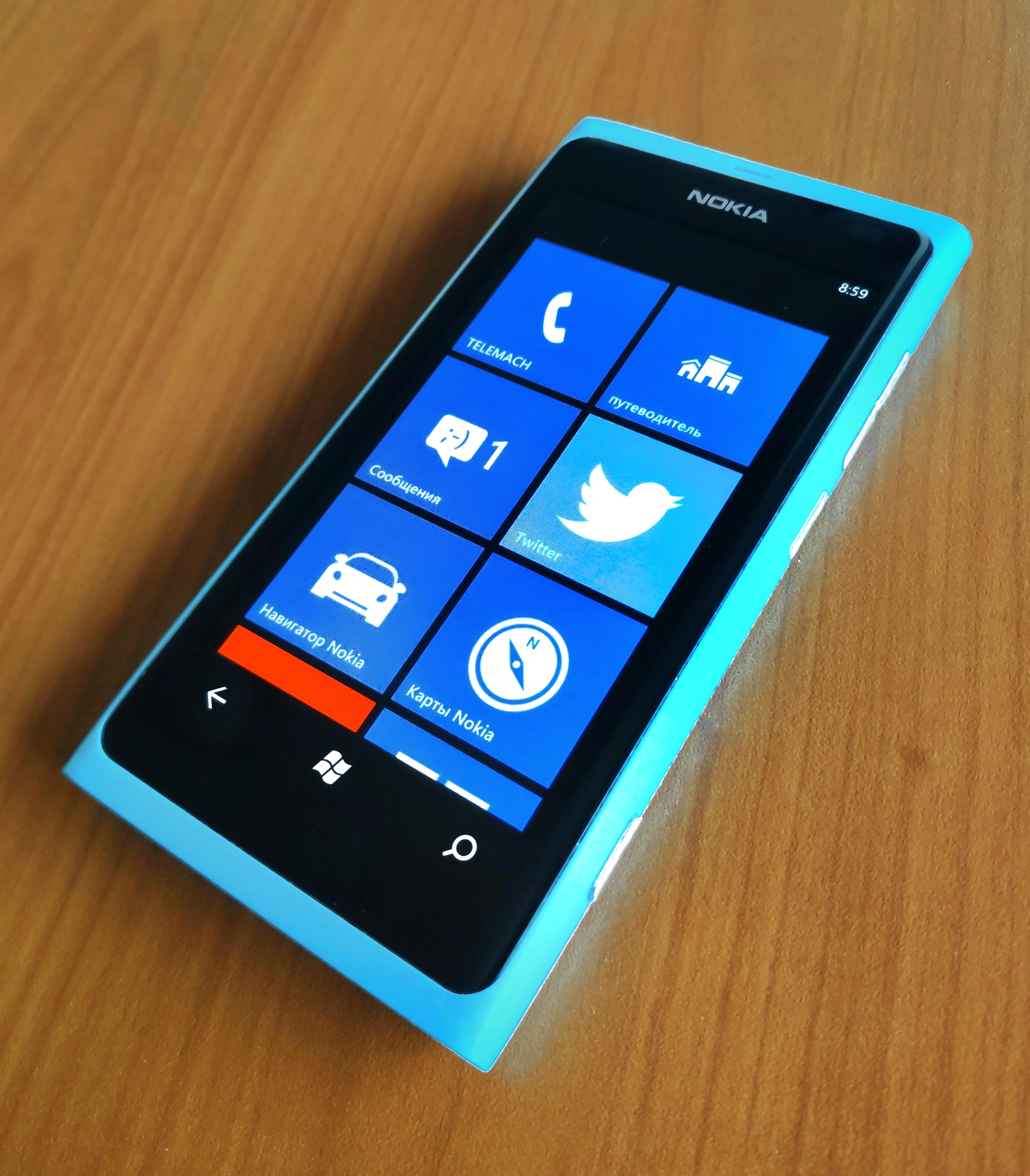
- Manufacturer: Nokia
- Availability by region: November 2011 (Europe); December 2011 (Worldwide); March 2012 (Australia, Brazil)
- Successor: Nokia Lumia 820
- Related: Nokia Lumia 710; Nokia Lumia 900; Nokia N9
- Compatible networks: Lumia 800; 2G GSM GSM/GPRS/EDGE – 850, 900, 1800, 1900 MHz; 3G WCDMA/HSDPA – 850, 1900, 2100 MHz; Lumia 800C (Mainland China only); 2G CDMA – 800, 1900 MHz; GSM/GPRS– 850, 900, 1800, 1900 MHz (International roaming only, including Hong Kong, Macau and Taiwan); 3G CDMA2000
- Form factor: Slate
- Dimensions: 116.5 mm (4.59 in) H 61.2 mm (2.41 in) W 12.1 mm (0.48 in) D
- Weight: 142 g (5.0 oz)
- Operating system: Windows Phone 7.5, updateable to Windows Phone 7.8
- System-on-chip: Qualcomm Snapdragon S2 MSM8255T
- CPU: 1.4 GHz single-core Qualcomm Scorpion
- GPU: Qualcomm Adreno 205
- Memory: 16 GB internal flash 512 MB ROM; 512 MB RAM
- Battery: Rechargeable BV-5JW 3.7v 1450 mAh Li-ion battery: Standby for up to 265h on 2G, up to 335h on 3G; Talk time for up to 13h on 2G, up to 9h 30min on 3G; Music playback for up to 55 hours.
- Rear camera: 8-megapixel, 3264x2448 pixels, dual-LED flash, autofocus Carl Zeiss optics, 720p video capture
- Front camera: None
- Display: 3.7" ClearBlack, Gorilla Glass AMOLED PenTile at 252 ppi capacitive touchscreen 480x800 px 16M-color WVGA
- Connectivity: Bluetooth 2.1, 802.11b/g/n, G-Sensor, Digital Compass, A-GPS, micro-USB, 3.5mm audio jack
- Data inputs: Multi-touch capacitive touchscreen, proximity sensor, ambient light sensor, 3-axis accelerometer, digital compass, 2 microphones
- Other: Available in cyan, magenta, black and white
- Website: Nokia Lumia 800 Archive

The Nokia Lumia 800, which was codenamed 'Sea Ray', is a smartphone that was launched by Nokia on October 26, 2011, at the Nokia World 2011 event. Initially, it operated on Snapdragon S2 processor and Windows Phone 7.5 "Mango" and was the first device manufactured by Nokia to run on the Windows Phone operating system. This marked a significant shift for the company from using Symbian for their smartphones. Upon its original release in November 2011 in Europe, it was Nokia's flagship product and was hence a crucial product for their mobile phone business.

Lumia 800 shares its design with the previously released MeeGo-based Nokia N9 and it was originally Meego CDMA-variant for Verizon with codename RM-716 Searay. The outward differences are one added physical button dedicated to the camera on the right side of the phone, and a dual LED flash moved directly above the Carl Zeiss camera lens. Despite a similar exterior, the Lumia 800 has a different interior than N9. Lumia 800's chipset comes from Qualcomm S2 processor, whereas the N9 is based on a Texas Instruments OMAP chipset and CPU. Like the N9, it has a convex-curved Gorilla Glass AMOLED PenTile screen with a ClearBlack antiglare filter. The screen diagonal is 3.7 inches (800 x 480 pixels), compared with 3.9 inches (854 x 480 pixels) for N9, to conform with the Windows Phone specifications list, which includes three capacitive softkeys placed under the glass. A through-colored unibody shell is made from polycarbonate plastic.

It was replaced as the flagship by Nokia Lumia 900, which was originally released for the American market through AT&T before its worldwide release. On 5 September 2012, the Nokia Lumia 820, the successor of the Nokia Lumia 800, was presented. The improvements are Windows Phone 8, dual core processor, front camera, wireless charging option, exchangeable covers, and bigger screen.

== Specifications ==
=== Display ===
- Size: 3.7 inches
- Resolution: 800 x 480 pixels
- Technology: AMOLED with ClearBlack antiglare filter

=== Processor ===
- Qualcomm Snapdragon S2 single-core
- Clock speed: 1.4 GHz

=== Memory ===
- RAM: 512MB
- Storage: 16GB (no microSD card slot for expansion)

=== Cameras ===
- Rear: 8 megapixels with autofocus and LED flash
- Front: VGA (no front-facing flash)

=== Software ===
- Operating System: Windows Phone 7.5 Mango (upgradeable to 7.8)

=== Connectivity ===
- Wi-Fi 802.11 b/g/n
- Bluetooth 2.1
- GPS with A-GPS support

=== Battery ===
- Capacity: 1450mAh

=== Other ===
- Sensors: Accelerometer, magnetometer, proximity sensor, ambient light sensor
- Materials: Polycarbonate body with Gorilla Glass display
- Available colors: Black, Cyan, Magenta (some sources mention White)

== History ==
A "Sea Ray" prototype smartphone was presented by Nokia CEO Stephen Elop at a private gathering in Espoo on 23 June 2011, two days after the introduction of the Nokia N9 in Singapore. The device's design was pretty much the same as the N9, except that it functionally ran on Windows Phone 7.5 ("Mango" update). Elop called on the audience to turn off their cameras because the device was "super confidential", but photos and a full video clip leaked on the internet, leading to reporters calling it naive or cynical. As a result, some in the media believed the presentation to be a "publicity stunt".

== Software ==
The Lumia 800 device comes with four Nokia-exclusive applications not included by the default Windows Phone OS: Nokia Drive, a free turn-by-turn navigation system; Nokia Maps; Nokia Music, a free streaming music service and music store; and App Highlights, a service suggesting software based on location and operator. In addition to these applications and services, Microsoft added Office 365, in which the user can edit documents, create spreadsheets, open PowerPoint presentations, and even make OneNote files. The files created can be stored on Microsoft's SkyDrive cloud service, on the phone itself, and other areas.

=== Nokia Collection ===
In addition to pre-installed Nokia-exclusive Windows Phone applications, the Windows Phone Marketplace contains a Nokia Collection section. As of April 2012, it contains the following additional applications: Nokia Transport, a location-aware public transport schedule and navigation application; Creative Studio, a photo editing application; TuneIn Radio, a local and global radio streaming application; CNN, a news reader and video viewer for the Cable News Network; and WRC Live, an application to follow live timing and media from the FIA WRC series.

=== Diagnostic Tool ===
Just like the Lumia 900, the 800 comes with a diagnostic tool. It can be accessed by pressing ##634# on the dial keypad, which should initiate the download after the last # is pressed. The diagnostic tool should appear on the app list under Diagnostics.

On this diagnostic tool, a user can run tests on the following: Accelerometer, ALS, audio loopback, camera, battery status, DTMF, gyroscope, hardware buttons, headset detection, LCD white, lights, life timer, magnetometer, power source, proximity, speaker, touch and vibration. It's also possible to perform all the tests in one run. The application is intended to be used by device engineers to run tests to find whether a certain component is working properly. The app is uninstallable.

=== Limitation to WP7 ===
According to Microsoft, due to platform architecture change, WP7 phones, based on the CE kernel, will not be upgradeable to Windows Phone 8, based on the NT kernel, which was released in the fall of 2012. Instead, Microsoft has released Windows Phone 7.8 in January 2013, which includes some WP8 features for existing WP7 phones.

== Release ==
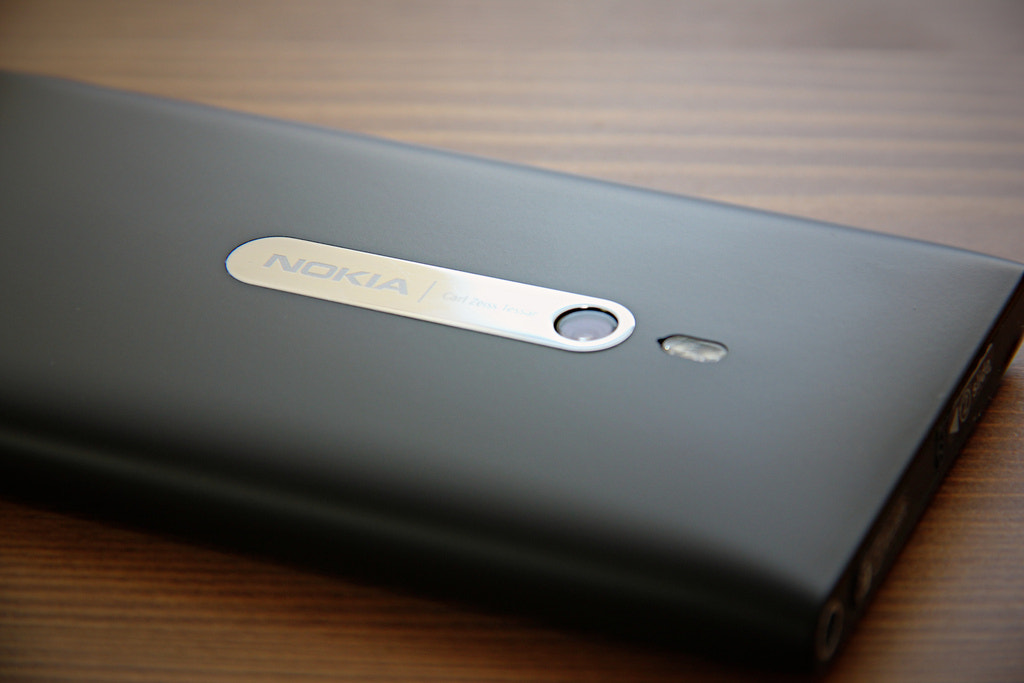
Back of the device in black colour

The Lumia 800 and the Lumia 710 were both presented by Nokia's CEO Stephen Elop at the Nokia World conference in London in October 2011. During the presentation, Elop referred to the devices as 'the first real Windows Phones'.

To promote the London launch, Nokia and Canadian-based DJ deadmau5 put on a massive music and laser show that illuminated the banks of the River Thames and the Millbank Tower. The Daily Telegraph reported that "The 118 metre building was turned into a canvas for a state-of-the-art light show during which the London skyscraper seemed to buckle and twist".

The Lumia 800 was a highly important product for Nokia, as it was the first flagship result of its alliance with Microsoft, which had been announced eight months earlier. The company had posted a second consecutive quarterly loss only a week before the launch, making the success of the Lumia 800 even more crucial.

Nokia outsourced the production of the Lumia 800 to Compal Electronics due to time constraints and Compal's experience with the chipset. However, future models, starting from Lumia 710, would be built in a Nokia factory, according to the same source. The devices for the European and Northern American markets were configured, tested, and packed by Nokia's factory in Salo, Finland.

Although the Lumia 800 was released in Canada, it was not released in the United States. To appeal more to American consumers, Nokia announced the Nokia Lumia 900 on 9 January 2012. The Lumia 900 was a parallel model with a gyroscope, LTE support, a larger display, front-facing camera for video conferencing, and an improved main (back) camera for focus and color balance, among other features not found in the 800.

== Reception ==
As of 26 January 2012, Nokia announced they had sold "well over 1 million Lumia devices to date", better than what was expected by analysts.

European carriers have stated that Nokia Lumia phones are not good enough to compete with Apple iPhone or Samsung Galaxy phones, that "they are overpriced for what is not an innovative product" and that "No one comes into the store and asks for a Windows phone".

Nokia Lumia 800 won the "Editor's Choice" award of 2011 from What Mobile magazine. Their review rated it 5/5, commending that "[t]he Lumia 800 is a massive step forward for Nokia and sits apart in an increasingly crowded market. Alongside Windows Phone Mango, there's enough inside the Lumia 800 to worry rivals and make iPhone fans jealous."

Brian Klug of AnandTech in his review wrote: "The Lumia 800 is indubitably the best Windows Phone hardware out there right now," with notable features such as "[a] camera without compromises, hardware build quality that's unique and solid, Nokia's attention to detail..." With regard to the device's shortcomings, Klug mentioned "lack of USB or external storage, a still fledgling application ecosystem, and a few others." Regarding the camera, Brian Klug added: "Lumia 800's camera comes out looking very good against the rest of the 8MP competition, and for me this is the first F/2.2 8 MP shooter I've come across. With less compression and better ISP, it could be even better than most."

In an Engadget review, Sharif Sakr wrote: "Nokia's Lumia 800 is a sophisticated and capable smartphone that melds its hardware beautifully with the Windows Phone OS." Sakr writes that while the phone lacked features like USB mass storage and expandable storage, the phone is welcome for those who want to be "part of a carefully crafted, simple and generally happy emerging ecosystem."

PC World reported that Nokia Lumia 800 has solid guts and shiny looks, and was an "interesting proposal", though they also said it had "nothing extraordinary to offer" when compared to the highest-end models of Samsung Galaxy Nexus, Motorola Droid RAZR, or the more expensive iPhone 4S in hardware and software.

Cnet UK noted that "overall, the Lumia 800 is a very good handset. The Windows Phone software is slick and fun to use, especially if you like to keep up-to-date with what friends are up to on social networking sites. It also looks attractive and the excellent build quality gives you the confidence that it's built to last." CNET UK made a camera comparison with current (as of early 2012) high-end phones iPhone 4S and Samsung Galaxy S II, and wrote that Lumia 800 "didn't offer the quality of camera we were hoping for." Regarding the camera, GSM Arena wrote, that "We were quite impressed by the job done by the 8 megapixel sensor and the bright F/2.2 lens. Images might not be the sharpest around and the noise levels are only average, but their colors and contrast are great, despite the sub-optimal lighting. Cameraphone lovers should definitely check this one out."

Ketaki Bhojnagarwala in The Hindu review wrote, "The Lumia 800 isn't perfect, but its one of the best products that Nokia has released in the market in recent months. I have no complaints about the hardware – Nokia gets it right every time. Windows Mango is a refreshing and vibrant operating system that's already got a big fan list,..."

In an opinion review by Matthew Baxter-Reynolds of The Guardian, after using Nokia Lumia 800 for a month and being a previous iPhone user, he argued that Lumia 800 is not up to an iPhone. In summary, he wrote: "I really wanted Windows Phone to work for me. This was £400 of my own money spent to try it. But it just doesn't work well enough to be the small-scale personal computer that I must have on me all the time."

== Reported problems ==
- On-screen keyboard disappearing during typing. Nokia has addressed the problem with a software fix in the update 8107.
- Nokia Lumia 800 is claimed to have "sound quality problems" when using low impedance headphones like the supplied ones. Nokia has acknowledged the issue.
- Battery life. In December 2011, Nokia confirmed that some Lumia 800 devices do not use the full capacity of their battery. They also state that "only a charger with an output of 1000mA will fully charge your Lumia 800 battery." During 19–20 January 2012, two updates were made available—battery related software update and another of Windows Phone 7.5 Mango build 8107. Nokia has stated that reported issues are fixed with the update and it triples the battery life.
- Problems with camera focus in certain conditions. Nokia has confirmed this.
- Daily Mobile reports an issue with screen flickering.
- Multiple reports of trouble turning device on.
- Inaccurate clock in some countries due to automatic time/date update servers being incompatible with some international carriers.
- Some carriers, such as EE, inhibited the OS update to version 7.8 leaving users stuck on version 7.5.

== Connectivity ==
Like other Windows Phone devices, Lumia 800 uses Microsoft's Zune software on Windows PCs to synchronize user content. For Mac OS X, the device can be synchronized with Windows Phone 7 Connector software. WiFi sync is also available when the phone is charging and connected to the same network as the host PC. Lumia 800 includes the Windows Phone feature of up to 25 GB free OneDrive storage in Microsoft's cloud service.

== See also ==
- Windows Phone
- Nokia Lumia 610
- Nokia Lumia 710
- Nokia Lumia 900
