= Nokia Lumia 900 =

Smartphone model

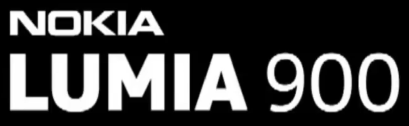
- Manufacturer: Nokia
- Series: Lumia
- Availability by region: June 2012
- Predecessor: Nokia N9
- Successor: Nokia Lumia 920
- Related: Nokia Lumia
- Compatible networks: GSM, HSDPA, Wi-Fi, LTE (AT&T)
- Form factor: Slate
- Dimensions: 128 mm (5.0 in) H 69 mm (2.7 in) W 12 mm (0.47 in) D
- Weight: 159 g (5.6 oz)
- Operating system: Windows Phone 7.5 Mango Commercial Release 2 (Mango + LTE) (not able to be updated to Windows Phone 8)
- System-on-chip: Qualcomm Snapdragon S2 APQ8055
- CPU: 1.4 GHz Qualcomm Scorpion
- GPU: Adreno 205 GPU
- Memory: 16 GB internal flash 16 GB ROM; 512 MB RAM
- Removable storage: None
- Battery: Rechargeable BP-6EW 1830mAh Li-ion battery
- Rear camera: 8-megapixel, 3264x2448 pixels, dual-LED flash, autofocus Carl Zeiss optics, 720p video capture
- Front camera: 1-megapixel, 1280x720 pixels 1.3 megapixel (AT&T)
- Display: 4.3" (109 mm) ClearBlack AMOLED capacitive touchscreen 480x800 px 217 ppi 16m-color WVGA; Gorilla Glass
- Connectivity: Bluetooth 2.1, 802.11b/g/n, dual mode A-GPS/GLONASS, micro-USB, 3.5mm audio jack, FM radio
- Data inputs: Multi-touch capacitive touchscreen, proximity sensor, ambient light sensor, 3-axis accelerometer, digital compass, dual microphone for active noise cancellation
- Website: Nokia Lumia 900

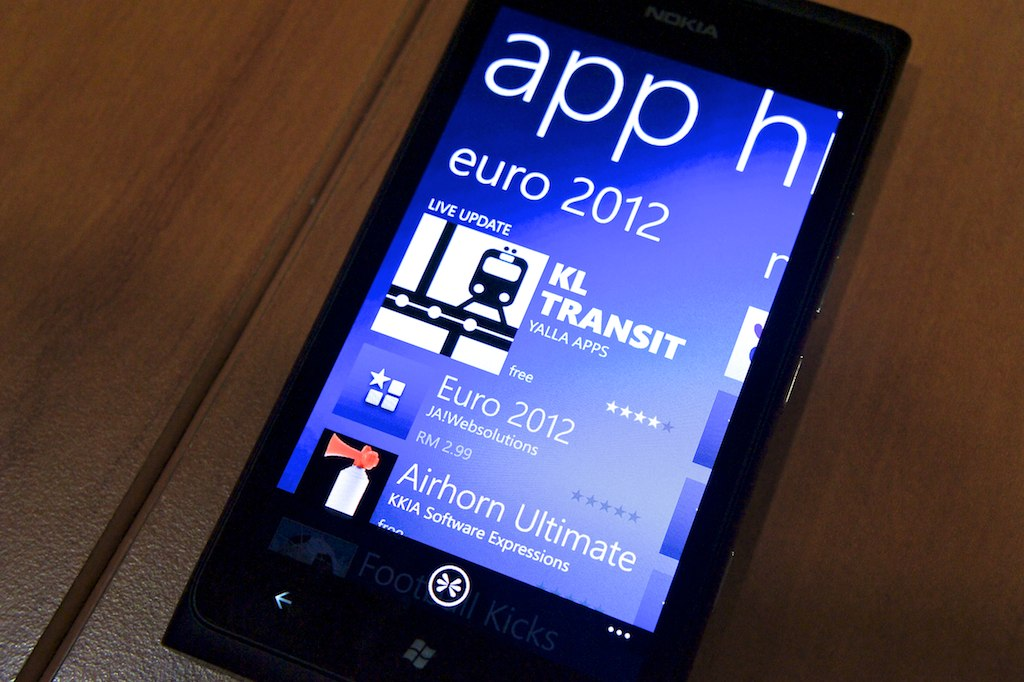
Nokia Lumia 900

The Nokia Lumia 900 is a Windows Phone-powered smartphone, first unveiled on January 9, 2012, by Nokia at Consumer Electronics Show 2012, where it won the Best Smartphone award in January 2012. The phone has 4G LTE support and was released in April 2012. The Lumia 900 was the flagship smartphone of the Lumia range until the release of its successor, the Lumia 920.

== Development ==
Soon after Nokia announced its partnership with Microsoft to produce and market Windows Phone devices in 2011, the company attempted to reach a deal with the major U.S. carrier AT&T to carry its devices. However, AT&T demanded a device with support for LTE connectivity—which Windows Phone did not yet support because Microsoft felt it was not a high priority yet. Citing the importance of the U.S. market to the wireless industry, Nokia ultimately collaborated with AT&T, Microsoft, and chipset developer Qualcomm to accelerate the development of LTE support for the Windows Phone platform. At the same time, Nokia quickly produced prototypes for a new smartphone, the Lumia 900—which would be tailored for the American market and be one of the first Windows Phone devices with support for LTE. After only 10 months of development (a considerably faster pace than normal), the Lumia 900 was unveiled during a Nokia press conference at International CES in January 2012. The HTC Titan II, another LTE-enabled Windows Phone device, would also be unveiled during an AT&T event at CES.

== Hardware ==
The Nokia Lumia 900 has a 4.3-inch (109 mm) display and a ClearBlack AMOLED 800×480 capacitive touchscreen. It has a one-piece polycarbonate body and is available in black, cyan, magenta, and white.

Though similar to the Lumia 800, which was never released in the United States, the Lumia 900 has numerous features differentiating it from the 800 in order to better meet the demands of American consumers. The 900 has a bigger 4.3" (109 mm) display with an RGB stripe pattern compared to the 800's PenTile pattern, a substantially higher capacity battery, fourth generation network (4G LTE) support, and a front-facing second camera for video calling.

== Software ==
The Lumia 900 device comes with four Nokia-exclusive applications not included by the default Windows Phone OS: Nokia Drive, a free turn-by-turn navigation system; Nokia Maps; Nokia Music, a free streaming music service and music store; and App Highlights, a service suggesting software based on location and operator. As of April 2012 it contains the following additional applications: Nokia Transport, a location-aware public transport schedule and navigation application; Creative Studio, a photo editing application; TuneIn Radio, a local and global radio streaming application; CNN, a news reader and video viewer for Cable News Network content; WRC Live, an application to follow live timing and media from the FIA WRC series.

=== Diagnostic Tool ===
Just like the Lumia 800, the 900 has the diagnostic tool. It can be obtained by pressing ##634# on the dial keypad, which should initiate the download after the last # is pressed. The diagnostic tool should appear on the app list under Diagnostics.

On this diagnostic tool a user can run tests on the following: Accelerometer, ALS, audio loopback, camera, battery status, DTMF, gyroscope, hardware buttons, headset detection, LCD white, lights, life timer, magnetometer, power source, proximity, speaker, touch and vibration. It's also possible to perform all the tests in one run.

Note: This app does not harm the phone, It is an application used by device engineers to test functions of the phone to find whether a certain component is working properly. The app can be uninstalled if a user chooses to do so.

=== Limitation to WP7 ===
According to Microsoft, due to changes in platform architecture, WP7 phones are not upgradeable to Windows Phone 8, which was released in the fall of 2012. Instead, Microsoft released Windows Phone 7.8, which includes some WP8 features for existing WP7 phones.

== Launch ==
In the US, Nokia and phone carrier AT&T Wireless had a big marketing splash for Lumia 900, which included a launch event in New York City's Times Square. According to AT&T's representative, the campaign would be even bigger than those done for iPhone. The Lumia 900 was also given a flagship slot at the carrier, alongside the iPhone 4S and the HTC One X.

== Availability ==
=== United States ===
The device has been available for pre-order since March 30, 2012 for a cost of $99 mail-in rebate with a new two-year contract with a minimum monthly voice package of $39.99 and a data plan of at least $20 a month, and an activation fee of $36, and was released on AT&T on April 8, 2012, in cyan and matte black. The glossy white version was released on April 22, 2012. On July 15, 2012, Nokia launched the pink/magenta version exclusive to AT&T stores.

The same day that the magenta version was released, the price with 2-year contract was reduced by $50. Jared Newman from Time's Techland wrote: "The further reduced price is a sign that the Lumia 900 isn't doing as well as Nokia and Microsoft had hoped." and suggested "smartphone shoppers should ignore the $50 off, and wait to see if Nokia can do better next time." During its first month of availability in April, the Lumia 900 was the second-best selling smartphone from AT&T after the iPhone 4, and it also topped Amazon's cellphone best-sellers list ahead of the Droid Razr Maxx and Galaxy Nexus. Sales momentum has since slowed down, such as at Best Buy where it was not doing as well as Android phones such as the HTC Evo 4G LTE and Samsung Galaxy S III.

=== Canada ===
In Canada, the Lumia 900 has been available since April 10, 2012, exclusively through Rogers. Only the black and cyan versions of the phone are offered, other colors like the popular white and magenta versions are currently not available in Canada.

=== United Kingdom ===
The Lumia 900 was released mid-May through Phones4U, and is also available through Carphone Warehouse.

The UK model does not feature 4G LTE connectivity for high-speed packet access, instead, it only features 3G HSPA+, which has speeds for the end user that are comparable to LTE. Other phone specifications remain the same.

=== Singapore ===
The Nokia Lumia 900 was sold starting from May 26, 2012, throughout all 3 carriers in Singapore, SingTel, Starhub and M1, at the recommended retail price of SGD $849 (USD $670). Like the UK model, the Asia model that is also sold in Singapore does not have 4G LTE connectivity as well.

=== Australia ===
A press conference in Sydney detailed the release date of Nokia Lumia 900 on the Optus carrier as June 2012 on a specific Optus Plan, with a recommended retail price of A$699 (US$693).

=== China ===
The Lumia 900 started shipping to China on June 14, 2012, along with a "Reaction" Bluetooth headset.

=== Malaysia ===
The Lumia 900 was sold through Maxis carrier starting June 15, 2012.

== Model variants ==
Model	RM-808	RM-823
Countries	Mexico, United States	International
Carriers/Providers	Telcel, AT&T	International
2G	Quad band GSM/EDGE (850/900/1800/1900 MHz)	
3G	Quad-Band HSPA+ 1, 2, 5/6, 8 (850/900/1900/2100 MHz)	
4G	Dual-Band LTE 4 and 17 (1700/700 MHz)	No
Max network speed	LTE: 50 Mbit/s	DC-HSPA+: 42 Mbit/s

== Reception ==
Officially announced at the Consumer Electronics Show 2012, the Nokia Lumia 900 won CNET's Best of CES award for smartphones, although in their review they agreed: "It won't outsell the Samsung Galaxy S II or iPhone 4S" where they highlight camera and call quality issues.

With Nokia's large US-based launch in April 2012, a growing number of reviews have been written about the device. Most reviews are positive about the device itself, and rather discuss in length the pros and cons of the new Windows Phone ecosystem.

Andy Ihnatko of Chicago Sun-Times wrote: "For the sort of user for whom a phone is simply an accessory to life and is neither the lens through which life is experienced nor the sword with which their daily battles are fought, the Lumia 900 and Windows Phone are worth wanting."

Brian Caulfield of Forbes in his review wrote that "the Lumia 900 might be the best Windows handset yet, but it won't break Apple and Android's grip on the smartphone market."

Joshua Topolsky of The Verge in his review wrote: "I've already said this, but it bears repeating. I really wanted to love this phone. From a design standpoint, the Lumia 900 was immediately enticing. I'd already been salivating over Nokia's N9 and Lumia 800, so knowing that a slightly larger (but more feature packed) version of that device was headed our way was fairly encouraging. But while the hardware — at least externally — delivers, the phone as a whole does not."

Jeffrey Van Camp of Digital Trends in his review wrote: "If you're looking for a good phone for a reasonable price, this is it. Just don't expect the cutting edge. We'll have to wait for Windows Phone 8 for Nokia devices that truly try to compete with Android and iPhone on specs."

Sam Biddle of Gizmodo wrote that the Lumia 'Might Save Windows Phone' and that it is 'so quick and elegant' and that the screen 'absolutely sings', giving the phone 4/5 stars.

Swiss newspaper 20 Minuten Online awarded the phone (along with the Lumia 800) as being the most beautifully designed handset, beating the Samsung Galaxy S3, the iPhone 4S and the HTC One X.

Walt Mossberg of AllThingsD in his review wrote: "If you're looking for a $100, high-end smartphone, or are a Windows Phone fan who has been waiting for better hardware, the Lumia 900 is worth considering. But the phone had just too many drawbacks in my tests to best its chief competitors."

Taylor Martin of phonedog wrote: "The most disappointing feature of the Lumia 900 is the camera."

== Reported problems ==
- Right after the U.S. launch of Lumia 900, the device was reportedly having connection problems, which Nokia acknowledged, pinpointing the issue to a programming error in memory management. Nokia very soon rolled out a fix on April 13, 2012, three days earlier than originally planned. Customers who purchased the phone prior to April 21, 2012, received an automatic $100 credit on their next AT&T or Rogers bill, a move from Nokia that was well received.
- On April 26, 2012, WinSource reported that the white Lumia 900 experiences a purple hue on low brightness. Nokia fixed the issue with a software update.
- The proximity sensor had performance issues. Nokia fixed the issue with a software update.
- The camera button is not waking the phone up from its idle sleep state.
- The phone makes a harsh rattling sound when it vibrates.
- Nokia Monster Purity headphones have issues with the controls for pausing and skipping tracks and the volume rocker.
- The handset volume is quite loud even at the lowest setting of "1". However, this is an issue experienced among all Windows Phones.
- The MMS Settings for Canadian legally unlocked Lumia 900 phones is not available with the current hardware/software release. This issue is well documented within Nokia and may be corrected by downloading the "Network Setup" app from the marketplace which was made available again to Canadians in early 2013.

== Successor ==
On September 5, 2012, the Nokia Lumia 920, the successor of the Nokia Lumia 900, was presented. The improvements are Windows Phone 8, dual core processor, a camera with PureView technology with 1080p video capture and image stabilization for still images and videos, wireless charging, 32 GB of storage, bigger screen with more resolution (4.5-inch 1280x768) and curved glass.

== See also ==
- Windows Phone
- Nokia Lumia 610
- Nokia Lumia 710
- Nokia Lumia 800
- Nokia Lumia 820
- Nokia Lumia 920
- Nokia Lumia 1020
