= Nokia 700 =

Smartphone

- Manufacturer: Nokia
- Type: Smartphone
- Series: Nokia 3-digit series
- First released: August 2011
- Availability by region: September 2011
- Predecessor: Nokia 7230; Nokia E5
- Successor: Nokia Lumia 710; Nokia Lumia 610
- Related: Nokia 603; Nokia 701
- Compatible networks: Quad band GSM 850/900/1800/1900; GPRS, EDGE; Pentaband UMTS (W-CDMA) 850/900/1700/1900/2100; HSDPA 14.4 Mbps; HSUPA 5.76 Mbps
- Form factor: Slate
- Colors: Grey, Silver/White, Red, Blue, Purple
- Dimensions: 110 mm (4.3 in) H 50.7 mm (2.00 in) W 9.7 mm (0.38 in) D
- Weight: 96 g (3.4 oz)
- Operating system: Nokia Belle, upgradeable to Nokia Belle Feature Pack 2
- CPU: ARM11 1.3 GHz Samsung K5W2G1GACT – AP50 processor
- GPU: Broadcom BCM2763 at 250 MHz with 128 MB RAM
- Memory: 512 MB RAM
- Storage: 2 GB
- Removable storage: microSD, up to 32 GB
- Battery: 1080 mAh Li-ion, removable (Nokia BP-5Z)
- Rear camera: 5 Megapixels (2592 х 1944 pixels), fixed focus, 16:9 720p video, 30 FPS
- Display: 640 × 360 px (nHD), 3.2" capacitive, multi-touch AMOLED display with the Nokia ClearBlack technology and Corning Gorilla Glass
- Connectivity: Sensors: Accelerometer; Electronic compass; Proximity sensor; Other: Bluetooth 3.0; USB 2.0 via MicroUSB; USB On-The-Go; Wi-Fi 802.11b/g/n; NFC; 3.5mm jack TRRS connector; TV-out via 3.5mm jack in SD quality (PAL/NTSC); FM radio, Stereo, RDS
- Data inputs: Capacitive multi-touch display; Key lock switch and eight keys for power, call creation, menu, call termination, volume up/zoom in, volume down/zoom down, voice recognition, and camera; Virtual keyboard; multiple text-entry options; Two microphones for noise cancellation or stereo recording; Sensors: Accelerometer, Ambient Light, Magnetometer, Proximity; GPS with A-GPS
- Other: Free lifetime voice-guided car and pedestrian navigation (Nokia Maps); Read PDF, Word, Excel, and PowerPoint documents with Quickoffice; UPnP/DLNA Server with Nokia Play to; Voice command/dial; Image Capture: Face Detection, Geo-tagging; OpenVG1.1 and OpenGL ES 2.0; Active Noise Cancellation; Digital Dolby sound experience after update to Belle FP1; ActiveSync; Qt 4.7.4; Java; Python

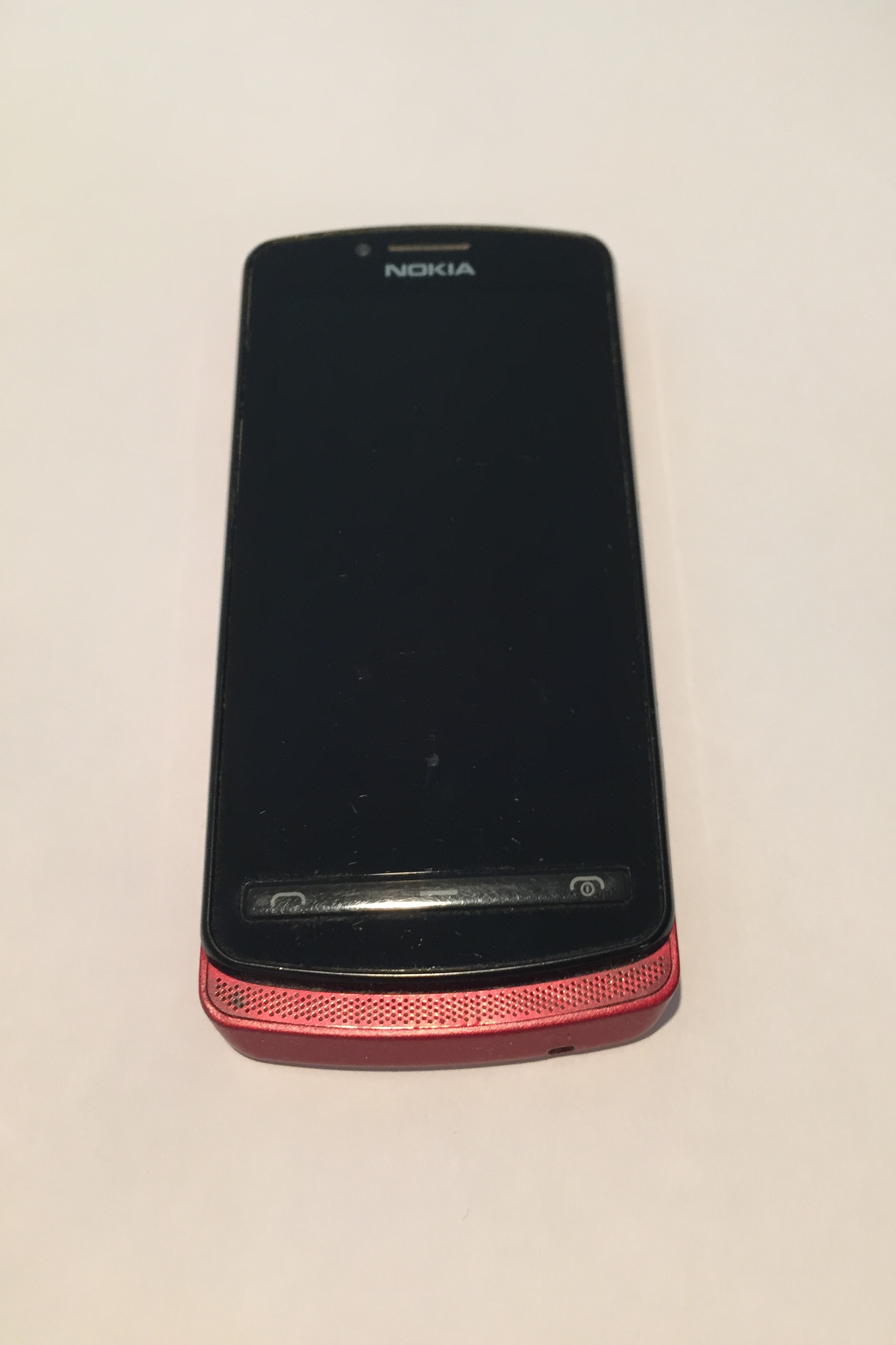
Nokia 700

The Nokia 700 is a Symbian-powered smartphone by Nokia. It was announced on 24 August 2011 and released in September 2011. Nokia claimed it was its most eco-friendly smartphone. The Nokia Belle Feature Pack 1 update increased the CPU clock rate from 1.0 GHz to 1.3 GHz.
