= Nokia Lumia 920 =

2012 smartphone manufactured by Nokia

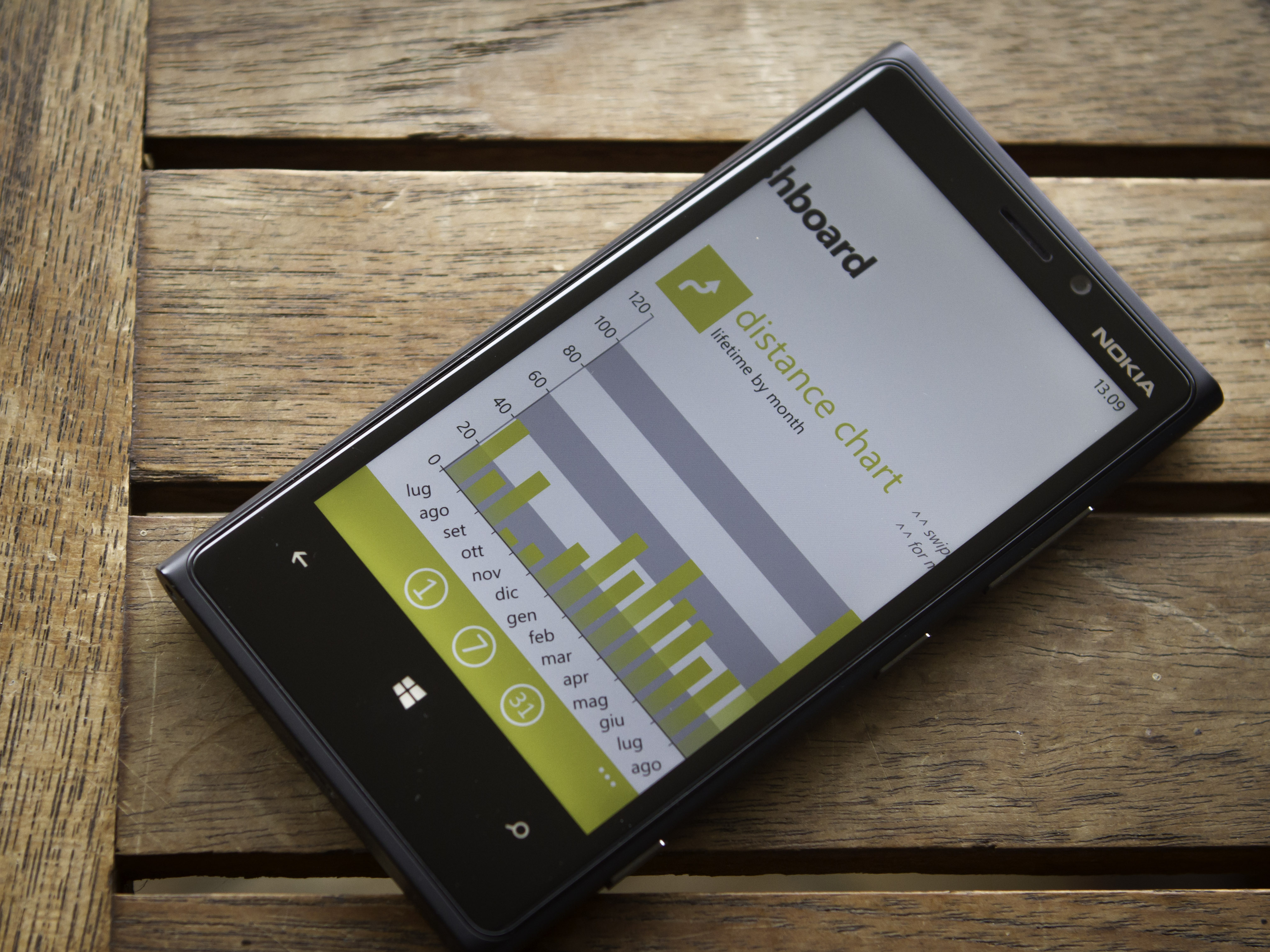
- Nokia Lumia 920
- Brand: Nokia
- Manufacturer: Nokia
- Type: Smartphone
- Series: Lumia
- First released: November 2, 2012; 14 years ago
- Discontinued: 2014
- Predecessor: Nokia Lumia 900
- Successor: Nokia Lumia 930
- Related: Nokia Lumia 1020, Nokia Lumia 925, Nokia Lumia 928, Nokia N9
- Compatible networks: GSM/GPRS/EDGE 850/900/1800/1900; HSPA 850/900/1700/1900/2100; LTE 700/800/850/900/1700/1800/2100/2600 (except non-LTE model); TD-SCDMA (920T)
- Form factor: Slate
- Dimensions: 130.3 mm (5.13 in) H 70.8 mm (2.79 in) W 10.7 mm (0.42 in) D
- Weight: 185 g (6.5 oz)
- Operating system: Windows Phone 8, upgradeable to Windows Phone 8.1
- System-on-chip: Qualcomm Snapdragon S4 MSM8960; Qualcomm Snapdragon S4 MSM8260A (China version)
- CPU: 1.5 GHz dual-core Qualcomm Krait
- GPU: Qualcomm Adreno 225 (920); Qualcomm Adreno 320 (920T)
- Memory: 1 GB RAM
- Storage: 32 GB internal flash
- Battery: Rechargeable BP-4GW 2000 mAh Lithium polymer battery, Qi inductive charging
- Rear camera: 8.7 MP (3264x2448) PureView with OIS, f/2.0 aperture, high-power dual-LED flash, autofocus, Carl Zeiss optics, 1080p video capture
- Front camera: 1.3 MP (1280x1024), 720p video capture
- Display: 4.5 in (110 mm) IPS LCD WXGA capacitive touchscreen with high sensitivity, 1280x768 pixels at 332 ppi, 16.7M colours, 60 Hz refresh rate, ClearBlack polarisation filter, RGB Stripe, Luminance 600 nits, 15:9 aspect ratio, Curved Gorilla Glass 2
- Connectivity: Bluetooth 4.0, Wi-Fi 802.11a/b/g/n NFC, microUSB v2.0 GPS with A-GPS and GLONASS; 3.5 mm audio connector
- Data inputs: Multi-touch capacitive touchscreen, proximity sensor, pedometer, ambient light sensor, gyroscope, magnetometer, 3-axis accelerometer, 3 microphones for active noise cancellation
- Other: Talk time: Up to 10 hours (9 hours for AT&T version); Music playback time: up to 67 hours Standby time: Up to 400 hours (approx. 16.7 days) (320 hours for AT&T version approx. 13.3 days)
- Website: Nokia Lumia 920

Nokia Lumia 920 (codenamed Phi) is a smartphone developed by Nokia that runs the Windows Phone 8 operating system. It was announced on September 5, 2012, and was first released on November 2, 2012. It has a 1.5 GHz dual-core Qualcomm Krait CPU and a 4.5" IPS TFT LCD, as well as a high-sensitivity capacitive touchscreen that can be used with gloves and fingernails; the display is covered by curved Gorilla Glass and has a 9 ms response time. The phone features an 8.7-megapixel PureView camera with OIS; it was the first smartphone camera to implement that technology, as well as to support Qi inductive charging. The phone comes with 32 GB of internal storage, but has no expandable storage.

The Lumia 920 was released to mixed to positive reception. Most critics noted the device as the first Windows Phone 8 device to truly match its Android and iOS competitors in hardware, with high-end specifications, a Nokia PureView camera and unique features such as wireless inductive charging. Following this, the Lumia 920 would frequently be listed among the "elite" group smartphone during its time, otherwise populated by heavyweights from Apple and Samsung. This represented the first time a Windows Phone device had been considered to have powerful and impressive enough hardware to qualify as a truly high-end flagship device. Many features such as the super-sensitive capacitive screen and wireless inductive charging were popularised by the device and were found in later high-end Android phones. The Lumia 920 went on to win 12 awards.

Some reviewers criticised the thickness and weight of the Lumia 920, so Nokia released the Nokia Lumia 925, a lighter and thinner version of the Lumia 920 with an aluminium body and an improved camera. The Nokia Lumia 930, successor to the Lumia 92x series, was announced at Build 2014 on April 2, 2014.

== Hardware ==
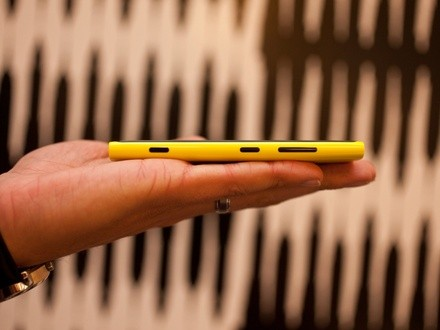
Side view of a yellow Nokia Lumia 920

The Nokia Lumia 920 shares the "Fabula" design language of its predecessors, the Lumia 900 and 800, as well as the Nokia N9, with a unibody polycarbonate shell. Multiple colours with glossy and matte finishes were available.

=== Processors, memory and storage ===
The Lumia 920 has a 1.5 GHz dual-core Qualcomm Krait CPU, a Qualcomm Adreno 225 GPU and 1 GB of system RAM. The Lumia 920T variant for the Chinese market comes with a 1.7 GHz dual-core Krait CPU and an Adreno 320 GPU.

All variants of the Nokia Lumia 920 come with an internal storage capacity of 32 GB and do not support microSD expansion.

=== Screen ===
The Lumia 920 has a 4.5-inch (114 mm) curved Gorilla Glass display with a resolution of 1280x768 (WXGA) and an aspect ratio of 15:9, using enhanced IPS screen technology which Nokia calls "PureMotion HD+". It has less than 9 ms average transition times, compared to an average of 23 ms for conventional IPS LCDs, which reduces motion blur. The screen has ClearBlack polarisation filters and an automatic adaptive system for adjusting brightness, colour and contrast details to compensate for lighting.

=== Camera ===
The Lumia 920 has Nokia's PureView technology on the rear camera, featuring an optically stabilised 8.7-megapixel BSI image sensor (1/3.2" sized, much smaller than the previous Nokia 808 Pureview) with a f/2.0 Carl Zeiss Tessar lens, short-pulse high-power dual-LED flash and 1080p HD video capture. Pixel size is 1.4 μm. The front camera encloses a 1.3-megapixel sensor capable of capturing HD video at 720p. The stabilization was the first in a cellphone.

==== Controversy ====
On September 6, 2012, Nokia apologised for an advertisement showing a video supposedly shot from somebody holding a Lumia 920 on a bike, but which was actually shot by somebody holding a camera in a van (as it can be seen in the reflections on a window). However, a later review indicated that the camera performance was comparable to that portrayed in the advertisement.

=== Connectivity ===
The Nokia Lumia 920, like its predecessor, supports 4G LTE technology. Other connectivity features include Wi-Fi 802.11 a/b/g/n, dual-band, Wi-Fi hotspot, Bluetooth 4.0, NFC and microUSB 2.0.

=== Battery and charging ===
The Lumia 920 has a 2000 mAh non-user-replaceable battery, providing a maximum standby time of up to 19 days and maximum talk time of up to 7.5 (2G) or 10 hours (3G).

In addition to USB charging, the Lumia 920 can be recharged inductively using the Qi standard. Rather than requiring the use of a physical connection to the phone, this allows the phone to be charged when placed upon a charging pad (which requires a separate power supply).

== Software ==
The Nokia Lumia 920 runs the Windows Phone 8 operating system. As with other Lumia devices, the 920 includes Nokia-exclusive apps, such as Nokia City Lens, an augmented reality software that gives dynamic information about users' surroundings using the camera.

It also includes Nokia's HERE suite of apps, which provide offline maps, worldwide turn-by-turn voice-guided navigation and public transit information. Other bundled apps include Nokia Music, which streams thousands of songs for free, and Nokia Smart Shoot, which lets users capture selected parts of a photo by using a lens for the camera app that takes a number of photos in quick succession.

=== Updates ===
On December 19, 2012, Nokia started rolling out the Portico update for the Lumia 920 and 820, which also included a firmware update for the 920 with camera fixes and battery improvements. Current Lumia 920 devices are already shipping with the Portico update.

From August 16, 2013, Nokia rolled out the Amber update, which is pre-installed on the Nokia Lumia 925 and 1020 and includes several camera and performance improvements, to every Nokia device running Windows Phone 8.

From approximately January 13, 2014, Nokia rolled out the Black update to Nokia Lumia devices running Windows Phone 8. Notable features include an enhanced glance screen and a new camera interface as well as a new Storyteller app.

Lumia 920 is not officially eligible for upgrading to Windows 10 Mobile, but Windows 10 Mobile Beta is available for Lumia 920.

== Technical issues ==
- Some users have reported their phone reboots randomly. The Portico update was intended to fix these random reboot issues, but the issues remained after the update. Further hotfixes addressing the issue were released in June 2015.
- Some users have complained that the battery drains too fast and the phone overheats. Aloysius Low from CNET Asia did not notice such a fast rate of battery drain on other smartphones even with the same usage pattern. The issue was fixed in the Portico update.
- Videos larger than 4 GB get corrupted when transferred to a computer.
- The Portico update introduced a brightness bug, but there is a possible workaround.
- Dust settles under the front-facing camera and the proximity sensor, potentially leading to dropped calls and preventing users from accessing phone-related menus. Owners of affected phones can have their screen replaced and a protective sheath fitted for free. Compressed air can also be used to remove the dust.

== Availability ==
There is a non-LTE model sold carrier-unlocked in Europe.

In Australia, the Lumia 920 is available from Telstra, and Optus via Harvey Norman retailers.

The Lumia 920 is available from Rogers Wireless in Canada.

The Lumia 920 is sold in China by China Mobile with an exclusive version, 920T, which includes a faster CPU and GPU. It was launched on December 23.

In the United States, the Lumia 920 is sold exclusively by AT&T. The cyan-coloured version is exclusive to AT&T.

In the UK, the Lumia 920 was released on November 2, 2012. It will be sold by EE (who operate T-Mobile and Orange in the UK) as one of the LTE-capable smartphones. Nokia have reported that the device will lose the EE-exclusivity in the UK, and will be available on the Vodafone and 3 networks from January 2013.

In Germany, the Lumia 920 is available from all major mobile phone retailers including Vodafone, O2, Deutsche Telekom and E-Plus.

In Denmark, it is available from all the major telecoms such as Telia, 3 and Telenor.

In Pakistan, Telenor Pakistan started selling the Lumia 920 in December 2012.

== Model variants ==
Info	Model			
Info	RM-820	RM-821	RM-822	RM-867 (Lumia 920T)
Countries	United States, Canada	Multiple	China	China
Carriers/ Providers	AT&T, Rogers Wireless	Unlocked	China Unicom	China Mobile
2G	Quad-Band GSM/EDGE (850/900/1800/1900 MHz)			
3G	Quad-Band HSPA+ 1, 2, 5, 8 (850/900/1900/2100 MHz)		Penta-Band HSPA+ 1, 2, 4, 5, 8 (850/900/1700/1900/ 2100 MHz)	TD-SCDMA Bands 34/A, 39/F (2010-2025/1880-1920 MHz)
4G	LTE Bands; 2, 4, 5, 17 (700/850/1700/ 1900 MHz)	Penta-Band LTE; 1, 3, 7, 8, 20 (800/900/1800/2100/ 2600 MHz)	N/A	
Max network speed	LTE: 100 Mbit/s DC-HSPA+: 42 Mbit/s		HSPA+: 21 Mbit/s	TD-SCDMA: 2.8 Mbit/s

== Reception ==
=== Stock market reaction ===
The initial stock market reaction to the Lumia 920 (and the Lumia 820, announced on the same day) was immediately negative. During the product announcement, Nokia shares closed down 16% on the day. The presentation itself was described as vague, disappointing and lacking "positive surprises, carrier announcements or specific launch dates".

=== Reviews ===
The Nokia Lumia 920 received mixed to positive reviews. Many critics noted the Lumia 920's hardware as the first time a Windows Phone device could truly compete with the hardware of high-end Android and iOS devices. Critics praised the screen, camera and unique features of the device, while also criticizing the phone's heft and thickness. CNET rated it 4 stars out of 5, praising the screen, attractive design, great Nokia-exclusive apps and an enjoyable OS, while the negatives were the unimpressive battery life and heavy weight. The user rating is 4.5 out of 5. ExpertReviews gave the Lumia 920 a rating of 5 out of 5. Mobiledia gave it 4 out of 5. Laptop Mag rated it 4 stars out of 5, praising the colourful design, superb camera, HD screen and inductive charging, as well as the useful Nokia apps. The cons were that it is relatively heavy and that Windows Phone 8 does not have as many apps as Android and iOS.

Dan Nosowitz from Popular Science wrote: "I spent a long time with the Lumia 920, longer than I usually spend with review units of phones. This is a phone I was really excited about! But I just can't recommend it. It's way too bulky, the battery life is lackluster, and Windows Phone 8 has some big problems on top of that. It's not a bad phone; when you're swiping away through a gorgeous weather or news app, you completely forget its shortcomings, and it's nicely priced. But there are better phones out there."

Adam Z. Lein from Pocketnow wrote: "Our final rating is going to be a 8.3 out of 10. The hardware, the screen, the camera, the sound quality, the video stabilization, and Nokia's custom apps are all extremely impressive. The pricing is pretty great too. The only negatives for me are really the large size and lack of user-replaceable battery. Everything else on this phone is top notch."

David Phelan from The Independent wrote "This is arguably the best smartphone Nokia has built, and probably the most advanced phone available. It mixes solid reliability with moments of surprise and delight." The reviewer at 4G.co.uk felt that the Lumia 920 was "Nokia's best smartphone for many years".

Sam Biddle from Gizmodo wrote: "It kills me to say this, because I wanted to own this instead of an iPhone 5, but no. No you shouldn't. It's too big and heavy. It's not fun to own. It's not enjoyable to use. If you want a Windows Phone, check out the very good HTC 8X. But this? No, not this."

However, Luke Hopewell from Gizmodo Australia wrote in reply: "Yes it's heavy, but it's something you get used to. Sam said that the phone is too heavy to even contemplate living with, and that's almost true. If you can get past the weight of the device, you're in for a treat. The weight is almost beneficial when it comes to taking photos, to be honest. It makes it easier to stabilise."

Dieter Bohn from The Verge wrote: "The software and hardware tradeoffs inherent in the Lumia 920 could be worth it if you've bought into the Microsoft ecosystem, but for most people I don't think it's a sure bet."

Jessica Dolcourt of CNET in her camera review wrote: "Photo quality was strong and fairly consistent, though photos had a blue cast to them and the Lumia 920 had problems with contrast and absolute sharpness compared with the others."

=== Sales ===
Initial sales reports and positive reviews of the Lumia 920 and 820 caused Nokia's shares to rise over 40% in December 2012, although analysts warned that the number of phones sold would fall far behind market leaders like Apple and Samsung. In an interview to Yle, then-CEO Stephen Elop said the positive public feedback had improved morale in the company.

On January 10, 2013, Nokia released preliminary financial information for Q4 2012, saying that it had sold more than 4.4 million Lumia devices in that quarter. In the United States, Lumia phones sold out very quickly due to limited shipments rather than significant demand.

On Amazon's bestseller list, the Lumia 920 has, as of November 2012, become the best-selling phone of the week, with different colour options taking the number one, two and four spots. In the UK, it topped Expansys' chart during the same period.

On its October 15, 2012 release, it topped the charts in France, beating the already-available iPhone 5, LG Optimus L3, Sony Xperia U and Samsung Galaxy Ace.

On November 23, 2012, it was reported that the device has had 2.5 million pre-orders around the world in just three weeks of availability. In comparison, that is more than the entire (previous) Lumia range (610, 710, 800, 900) sold in the whole of the third quarter of 2012.

According to the technology blog BGR, "recent discussions with two United Kingdom operators reflect an emerging consensus that the Lumia 920 is fading fast in Europe, while the low-end Lumia 520 is sparking a lot of early interest".

=== Awards ===
The Lumia 920 received 12 media awards in 2012:

- V3.co.uk - Top Smartphone of 2012.
- Gizmodo Australia - Best Mobile Phone of 2012, Readers Choice Award
- International Forum Design, Germany - iF Award for Outstanding Design
- Mobile Magazine, Denmark - Mobil Award for Best Smartphone Design
- The Next Web - Best Smartphones of 2012
- Mobil, Sweden - Top Score Award
- CNET - The Best High End Smartphones
- Ars Technica - Best Camera Phone runner-up, Best Mapping Phone runner-up, Best Windows Phone 8 handset runner-up
- Mashable - Top 25 Tech of 2012
- Mybroadband, South Africa - Top Smartphone of the Year
- BGR - Best AT&T Smartphones of 2012

In 2013 the Lumia 920 received the following awards:

- The Engadget Reader's Choice Smartphone of the Year Award 2012
- Mobile News Awards 2013 Innovative Handset

== See also ==
- Microsoft Lumia
- Nokia Lumia 900
- Nokia Lumia 925
