= Nokia 701 =

2011 smartphone model

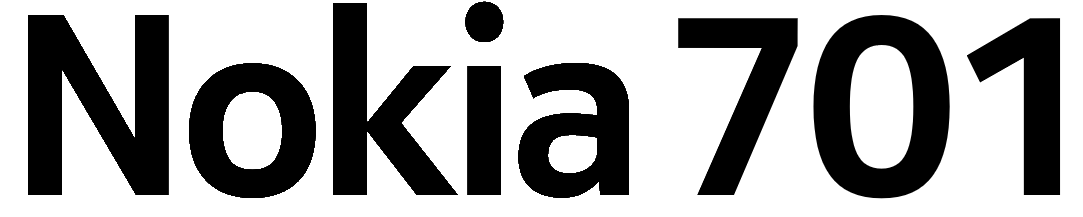
- Manufacturer: Nokia
- Type: Smartphone
- Series: Nokia 3-digit series
- First released: September 2011
- Availability by region: Q3 2011
- Predecessor: Nokia C7-00
- Successor: Nokia Lumia 710
- Related: Nokia 603; Nokia 700
- Compatible networks: Quad band GSM 850/900/1800/1900; GPRS, EDGE; Pentaband UMTS (W-CDMA) 850/900/1700/1900/2100; HSDPA 14.4 Mbps; HSUPA 5.76 Mbps
- Form factor: Slate
- Colors: Dark, Silver, Violet, White
- Dimensions: 117.2 mm (4.61 in) H 56.8 mm (2.24 in) W 11 mm (0.43 in) D
- Weight: 131 g (4.6 oz)
- Operating system: Nokia Belle, upgradeable to Nokia Belle Feature Pack 2
- CPU: ARM11 1.3 GHz Samsung K5W2G1GACT – AP50 processor
- GPU: Broadcom BCM2763 at 250~300 MHz with 256 MB RAM
- Memory: 512 MB RAM
- Storage: 8 GB
- Removable storage: microSD, up to 32 GB
- Battery: 1300 mAh Li-ion, removable (Nokia BL-5K)
- Rear camera: 8 MP (3264 x 2448 pixels), fixed focus, dual LED flash Video: 16:9 720p, 30 FPS
- Front camera: VGA camera (640 x 480 pixels) 30 FPS for video recording, QCIF video (176 x 144 pixels), 15 FPS for video calling
- Display: 640 × 360 px (nHD), 3.5" capacitive, multi-touch IPS-LCD with the Nokia ClearBlack technology and Corning Gorilla Glass, 1000 nits high brightness
- Connectivity: Sensors: Accelerometer; Electronic compass; Proximity sensor; Other: 3.5mm jack TRRS connector; Bluetooth 3.0; Wi-Fi 802.11 b/g/n; GPS with A-GPS; NFC; FM radio, Stereo, RDS. FM transmitter; USB 2.0 via MicroUSB; USB On-The-Go; TV-out via 3.5mm jack in SD quality (PAL/NTSC) output 720p HD
- Data inputs: Capacitive multi-touch display; Key lock switch and eight keys for power, call creation, menu, call termination, volume up/zoom in, volume down/zoom down, voice recognition, and camera; Virtual keyboard; multiple text-entry options; Two microphones for noise cancellation or stereo recording
- Other: Free lifetime voice-guided car and pedestrian navigation (Nokia Maps); Read PDF, Word, Excel, and PowerPoint documents with Quickoffice; UPnP/DLNA Server with Nokia Play to; Voice command/dial; Image Capture: Face Detection, Geo-tagging; OpenVG1.1 and OpenGL ES 2.0; Active Noise Cancellation; Digital Dolby sound experience after update to Belle FP1; ActiveSync; Qt 4.8.1; Java 2.5; Python

The Nokia 701 is a Symbian-powered smartphone by Nokia. It was announced on 24 August 2011 and released in the third quarter of 2011. Its design is very much based on that of the Nokia C7. The Nokia Belle Feature Pack 1 update increased the CPU clock rate from 1.0 GHz to 1.3 GHz.

The Nokia 701 was announced on 24 August 2011 as one of Nokia's first smartphones to ship with Symbian Belle. Its initial suggested price was approximately €290 before taxes and carrier subsidies.

One of the main features promoted at launch was its 3.5-inch IPS LCD ClearBlack display. Nokia described it as the brightest smartphone display available at the time. In testing, GSMArena measured brightness exceeding 1,000 nits and noted particularly strong sunlight legibility.
