= Nokia Lumia 610 =

2012 smartphone model

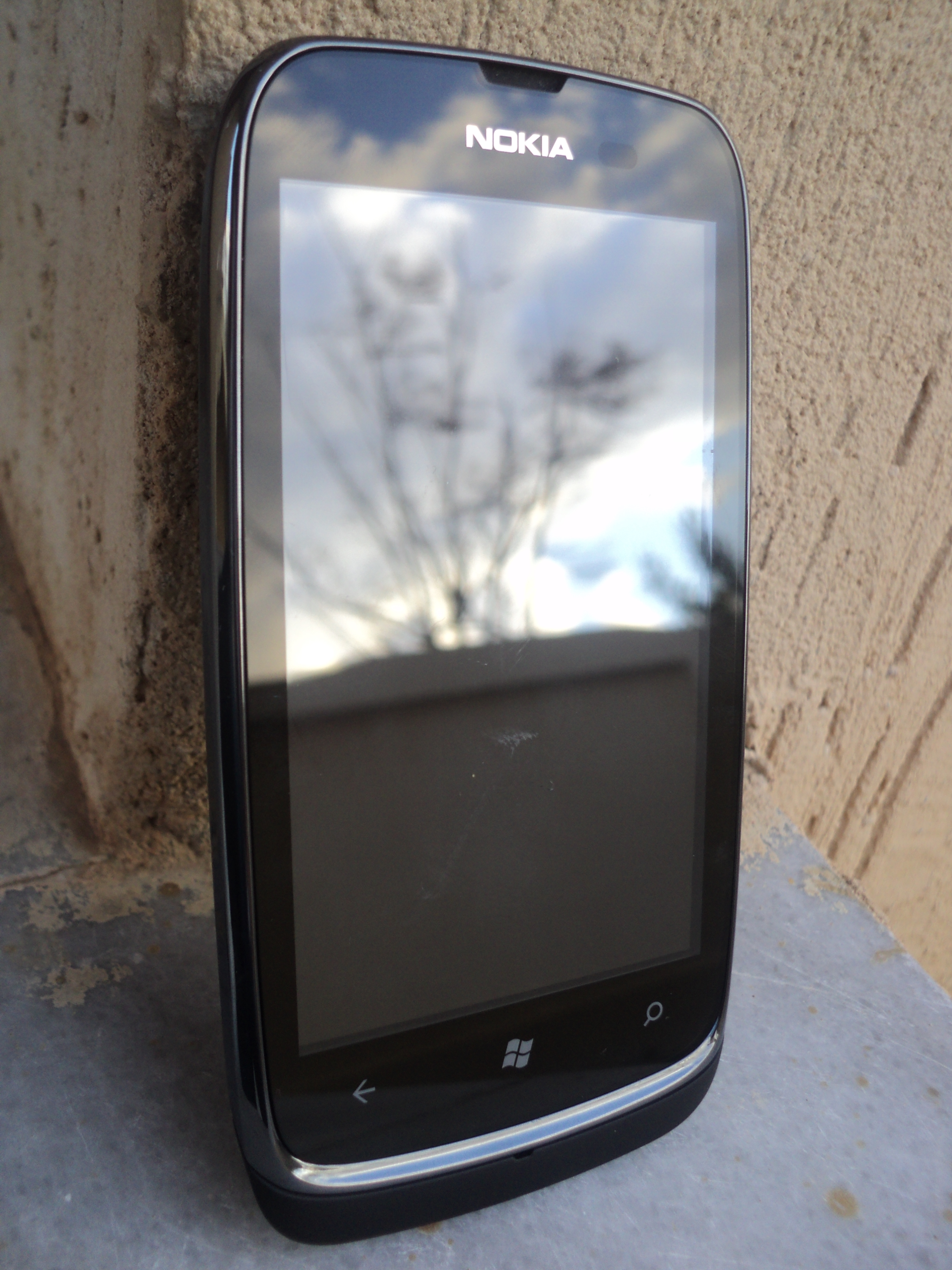
- A Nokia Lumia 610 Front view
- Manufacturer: Compal Electronics
- Series: Lumia
- Availability by region: Q2 2012
- Discontinued: 2013
- Predecessor: Nokia 603
- Successor: Nokia Lumia 620
- Related: Nokia Lumia 510; Nokia Lumia 710; Nokia Lumia 800; Nokia Lumia 900
- Compatible networks: 2G bands GSM 850 / 900 / 1800 / 1900; 3G bands HSPA 850 / 900 / 1900 / 2100
- Form factor: Slate
- Dimensions: 119 mm (4.7 in) H 62.2 mm (2.45 in) W 11.95 mm (0.470 in) D
- Weight: 131.5 g (4.64 oz)
- Operating system: Windows Phone 7.5 (not able to be updated to Windows Phone 8)
- System-on-chip: Qualcomm Snapdragon S1 MSM7227A
- CPU: 800 MHz ARM Cortex-A5
- GPU: Qualcomm Adreno 200
- Memory: 8 GB internal flash 256 MB ROM; 256 MB RAM
- Battery: Rechargeable BP-3L 3.7V 1300mAh Li-ion battery (up to 530 hrs standby, 6.5 hrs talk time)
- Rear camera: 5-megapixel 2592x1944 pixels, LED flash, autofocus
- Display: 3.7 in. LCD capacitive touchscreen with Gorilla Glass; 480x800 px at 252 ppi 16M-color WVGA
- Connectivity: Bluetooth 2.1, 802.11b/g/n, A-GPS, micro-USB, 3.5mm audio jack
- Data inputs: Multi-touch capacitive touchscreen, proximity sensor, ambient light sensor
- Website: Nokia Lumia 610

Nokia Lumia 610 is a Windows Phone smartphone announced at Mobile World Congress 2012. It is designed for young consumers that are buying their first smartphone. The Lumia 610 has a curvy, metallic design. Like the Lumia 710, it comes in cyan, magenta, black and white. The black and magenta version have a rubberized back instead of the glossy back as found in the white and cyan version of this phone.

Due to the limited memory available on this phone, background tasks using more than 90 MB of RAM will be automatically disabled, and certain applications may not be able to run. Applications whose user experience is not up to par with Nokia and the application (like Skype, Angry Birds or Pro Evolution Soccer) expectation, will not be available from the marketplace.

On 11 April 2012 Nokia introduced a variant with Near Field Communication (NFC), the first Lumia device with NFC technology. It was released in collaboration with operator Orange in Europe.

On 5 December 2012, the Nokia Lumia 620, the successor of the Nokia Lumia 610, was presented. The improvements are Windows Phone 8, dual-core 1 GHz Qualcomm S4 chipset, 512 MB of RAM, a front-facing VGA camera, a slightly bigger 3.8-inch display and support for up to 64 GB microSD cards.

== Specifications ==
=== Hardware ===
The Lumia 610 has a 3.7-inch TFT capacitive display. It is powered by an 800 MHz Cortex-A5 Qualcomm Snapdragon S1 processor, 256 MB of RAM and 8 GB of internal storage. It has a 1300 mAh Li-ion battery and a 5-megapixel rear camera. It is available in white, cyan, magenta and black.

=== Software ===
The Lumia 610 ships with Windows Phone 7.10

== Reception ==
The GSMArena team wrote: "The truth is the Nokia Lumia 610 is currently slightly overpriced. We did say that it's all about what you get and not what you miss in this class but, as things currently stand, its competitors will give you more without extra charge. It sounds like common sense that the only way for an affordable WP smartphone to succeed is to be cheaper than its droid peers."

Jonathan Choo of FoneArena in his review wrote: "I feel that resources spent at making Windows Phone Tango a reality on 256MB RAM devices were wasted. I know I have used the word compromise a lot in this review, but that is what the Lumia 610 is. It’s a phone full of compromises. With Windows Phone Apollo nearing completion, I suspect this will be the first and only Tango device to be ever released by the Finnish brand, and for that alone, I just can’t possibly recommend this. If you are in the market for a budget Windows Phone device, get the Lumia 710 or HTC Radar, or check out one of the older first generation Windows Phone devices like the Omnia 7 and HTC 7 Trophy instead."

== See also ==
- Windows Phone
- Nokia Lumia 710
- Nokia Lumia 800
- Nokia Lumia 900
