= Windows Phone =

Family of mobile operating systems developed by Microsoft

- An example of a custom Start screen on Windows Phone 8.1
- Developer: Microsoft
- Written in: C, C++, Assembly Language, C#
- OS family: Microsoft Windows
- Working state: Discontinued
- Source model: Closed-source
- Initial release: WW: October 21, 2010 – January 14, 2020 (9 years, 2 months, 3 weeks and 3 days); US: November 8, 2010
- Final release: 8.1 Update 2 (8.10.15148.160) / June 2, 2015; 11 years ago
- Available in: 130 languages
- Update method: Zune Software (Windows Phone 7), Firmware over the air (Windows Phone 8+)
- Package manager: Windows Phone Store
- Supported platforms: Qualcomm Snapdragon
- Kernel type: Hybrid (Monolithic in Windows Phone 7)
- License: Proprietary software licensed to OEMs
- Preceded by: Windows Mobile, Zune
- Official website: Archived official website at the Wayback Machine (archive index)

Support status
- Unsupported, see § Versions for details

Windows Phone (WP) is a discontinued mobile operating system developed by Microsoft for smartphones as the replacement successor to Windows Mobile and Zune. Windows Phone featured a new user interface derived from the Metro design language. Unlike Windows Mobile, it was primarily aimed at the consumer market rather than the enterprise market.

It was first launched in October 2010 with Windows Phone 7. Windows Phone 8 succeeded it in 2012, replacing the Windows CE-based kernel of Windows Phone 7 with the Windows NT kernel used by the PC versions of Windows (and, in particular, a large amount of internal components from Windows 8). Due to these changes, the OS was incompatible with all existing Windows Phone 7 devices, although it still supported apps originally developed for Windows Phone 7. In 2014, Microsoft released the Windows Phone 8.1 update, which introduced the Cortana virtual assistant, and Windows Runtime platform support to create cross-platform apps between Windows PCs and Windows Phone.

In 2015, Microsoft released Windows 10 Mobile, which promoted increased integration and unification with its PC counterpart, including the ability to connect devices to an external display or docking station to display a PC-like interface. Although Microsoft dropped the Windows Phone brand at this time in order to focus more on synergies with Windows 10 for PCs, it was still a continuation of the Windows Phone line from a technical standpoint, and updates were issued for selected Windows Phone 8.1 devices.

While Microsoft's investments in the platform were headlined by a major partnership with Nokia (whose Lumia series of smartphones, including the Lumia 520 in particular, would represent the majority of Windows Phone devices sold by 2013) and Microsoft's eventual acquisition of the company's mobile device business for just over US$7 billion (which included Nokia's then-CEO Stephen Elop joining Microsoft to lead its in-house mobile division), the duopoly of Android and iPhone remained the dominant platforms for smartphones, and interest in Windows Phone from app developers began to diminish by mid-decade. Microsoft laid off the Microsoft Mobile staff in 2016, after having taken a write-off of $7.6 billion on the acquired Nokia hardware assets, while market share sank to 1% that year. Microsoft began to prioritize software development and integrations with Android and iOS instead, and ceased active development of Windows 10 Mobile in 2017.

== History ==
=== Development ===
Work on a major Windows Mobile version may have begun as early as 2005 under the codename "Photon", and later known as "Windows Mobile 7", but work moved slowly and the project was ultimately cancelled. In 2008, Microsoft reorganized the Windows Mobile group and started work on a new mobile operating system. The product was planned to be released in 2009 as Windows Phone, but several delays prompted Microsoft to develop Windows Mobile 6.5 as an interim release.

Microsoft announced the "Windows Phone" brand in MWC 2009, however it doesn't mean the mobile operating system in that time, but it means the mobile phones with Windows Mobile operating system included. Later, Microsoft announced the re-designed Windows Phone 7 operating system in MWC 2010.

Following this, Windows Phone was developed quickly. One result was that the new OS would not be compatible with Windows Mobile applications. Larry Lieberman, senior product manager for Microsoft's Mobile Developer Experience, told eWeek: "If we'd had more time and resources, we may have been able to do something in terms of backward compatibility." Lieberman said that Microsoft was attempting to look at the mobile phone market in a new way, with the end user in mind as well as the enterprise network. Terry Myerson, corporate VP of Windows Phone engineering, said, "With the move to capacitive touch screens, away from the stylus, and the moves to some of the hardware choices we made for the Windows Phone 7 experience, we had to break application compatibility with Windows Mobile 6.5."

From the beginning of Windows Phone until at least 2015, Joe Belfiore was the head of development and the face of the platform's initiatives.

=== Partnership with Nokia ===
On February 11, 2011, at a press event in London, Microsoft CEO Steve Ballmer and Nokia CEO Stephen Elop announced a partnership between their companies in which Windows Phone would become the primary smartphone operating-system for Nokia, replacing Symbian. The event focused largely on setting up "a new global mobile ecosystem", suggesting competition with Android and iOS with the words "It is now a three horse race". Elop stated the reason for choosing Windows Phone over Android, saying: "the single most important word is 'differentiation'. Entering the Android environment late, we knew we would have a hard time differentiating." While Nokia would have had more long-term creative control with Android (MeeGo as used by Nokia resembles Android more than it does Windows Phone 7 as both Android and MeeGo are based on the Linux kernel), Elop enjoyed familiarity with his past company where he had been a top executive.

The pair announced integration of Microsoft services with Nokia's own services; specifically:

- Bing would power search across Nokia devices
- integration of Nokia Maps with Bing Maps
- integration of Nokia's Ovi store with the Windows Phone Store

The partnership involves "funds changing hands for royalties, marketing and ad-revenue sharing", which Microsoft later announced as "measured in billions of dollars". Jo Harlow, whom Elop tapped to run Nokia's smartphone business, rearranged her team to match the structure led by Microsoft's VP of Windows Phone, Terry Myerson. Myerson was quoted as saying, "I can trust her with what she tells me. She uses that same direct and genuine communication to motivate her team."

The first Nokia Lumia Windows Phones, the Lumia 800 and Lumia 710, were announced in October 2011 at Nokia World 2011.

At the Consumer Electronics Show in 2012 Nokia announced the Lumia 900, featuring a 4.3-inch AMOLED ClearBlack display, a 1.4 GHz processor and 16 GB of storage. The Lumia 900 was one of the first Windows Phones to support LTE and was released on AT&T on April 8, 2012. An international version launched in Q2 2012, with a UK launch on May 11, 2012. The Lumia 610 was the first Nokia Windows Phone to run the Tango Variant (Windows Phone 7.5 Refresh) and was aimed at emerging markets.

On September 2, 2013, Microsoft announced a deal to acquire Nokia's mobile phone division outright, retaining former CEO Stephen Elop as the head of Microsoft's devices operation. The merger was completed after regulatory approval in all major markets in April 2014. As a result, Nokia's hardware division became a subsidiary of Microsoft operating under the name Microsoft Mobile.

On February 24 2014, Nokia released the Nokia X series of smartphones (later discontinued on July 17 2014) using a version of Android forked from the Android Open Source Project. The operating system was modified; Google's software was not included in favor of competing applications and services from Microsoft and Nokia, and with a user interface highly modified to resemble Windows Phone.

== Versions ==
Version	Marketing name	Announcement date	Release date	EOL date
CE 6.0	Windows Phone 7	February 15, 2010	November 8, 2010	January 8, 2013
CE 6.0	Windows Phone 7.5	February 22, 2011	September 27, 2011	October 14, 2014
CE 6.0	Windows Phone 7.8	June 20, 2012	February 1, 2013	October 14, 2014
NT 6.2	Windows Phone 8	June 20, 2012	October 29, 2012 (Note: Released shortly after Windows 8.)	January 12, 2016
NT 6.3	Windows Phone 8.1	April 14, 2014 (Note: Originally scheduled after its PC counterpart, but delayed due to the release of iOS 7.1.)	August 4, 2014	July 11, 2017
NT 10.0	Windows 10 Mobile	November 20, 2015	March 17, 2016	January 14, 2020 (Note: Originally scheduled on December 10, 2019, but delayed following one more security update due to the release of iOS 13.3. Supported until January 10, 2023 via the paid Extended Security Updates service.)

=== Windows Phone 7 ===
Logo used for Windows Phone 7.5

Windows Phone 7 was announced at Mobile World Congress in Barcelona, Catalonia, Spain, on February 15, 2010, and released publicly on November 8, 2010 in the United States.

In 2011, Microsoft released Windows Phone 7.5 Mango. The update included a mobile version of Internet Explorer 9 that supports the same web standards and graphical capability as the desktop version, multi-tasking of third-party apps, Twitter integration for the People Hub, and Windows Live SkyDrive access. A minor update released in 2012 known as "Tango", along with other bug fixes, lowered the hardware requirements to allow for devices with 800 MHz CPUs and 256 MB of RAM to run Windows Phone.

Windows Phone 7 devices can not be upgraded to Windows Phone 8 due to hardware limitations. Windows Phone 7.8 was released as a stopgap update in 2013 to include some of the user interface features from Windows Phone 8.

=== Windows Phone 8 ===
Logo used for Windows Phone 8 and Windows Phone 8.1

On October 29, 2012, Microsoft released Windows Phone 8, a new generation of the operating system. Windows Phone 8 replaced its previously Windows CE-based architecture with one based on the Windows NT kernel with many components shared with Windows 8.

=== Windows Phone 8.1 ===
Windows Phone 8.1 was announced on April 2, 2014, after being released in preview form to developers on April 10, 2014. New features added include a notification center, support for the Internet Explorer 11 web browser, with tab syncing among Windows 8.1 devices, separate volume controls, and the option to skin and add a third column of live tiles to the Start Screen. Starting with this release, Microsoft dropped the requirement that all Windows Phone OEMs include a camera button and physical buttons for back, Start, and Search.

Windows Phone 8.1 introduced Cortana, a voice assistant similar to Siri and Google Now. Cortana replaced the previous Bing search feature, and was released as a beta in the United States in the first half of 2014, before expanding to other countries in early 2015.

=== Windows 10 Mobile ===
Logo used for Windows 10 and Windows 10 Mobile

Windows 10 Mobile was announced on January 21, 2015, as a mobile operating system for smartphones and tablets running on ARM architecture. Its primary focus is unification with Windows 10, its PC counterpart, in software and services; in accordance with this strategy, the Windows Phone name has been phased out in favor of branding the platform as an edition of Windows 10, although it is still a continuation of Windows Phone, and most Windows Phone 8.1 devices can be upgraded to the platform.

Windows 10 Mobile emphasized software using the Universal Windows Platform (UWP), which allowed apps to be designed for use across multiple Windows 10-based product families with nearly identical code, functionality, and adaptations for available input methods. When connected to an external display, devices could also render a stripped-down desktop interface similar to Windows on PCs, with support for keyboard and mouse input. Windows 10 Mobile featured Skype message integration, updated Office Mobile apps, notification syncing with other Windows 10 devices, support for the Microsoft Edge web browser, and other user interface improvements. Microsoft developed a middleware known as Windows Bridge to allow iOS Objective-C and Android C++ or Java software to be ported to run on Windows 10 Mobile with limited changes to code.

With the diminishing interest and application development for the platform, Microsoft discontinued active development of Windows 10 Mobile in 2017, and the platform was declared end of life on January 14, 2020.

== Features ==
=== User interface ===
Windows Phone features a user interface based on Microsoft's "Metro" design language, and was inspired by the user interface in the Zune HD. The home screen, called the "Start screen", is made up of "Live Tiles", which have been the inspiration for the Windows 8 live tiles. Tiles are links to applications, features, functions and individual items (such as contacts, web pages, applications or media items). Users can add, rearrange, or remove tiles. Tiles are dynamic and update in real time – for example, the tile for an email account would display the number of unread messages or a tile could display a live update of the weather. Since Windows Phone 8, live tiles can also be resized to either a small, medium, or large appearance.

Several features of Windows Phone are organized into "hubs", which combine local and online content via Windows Phone's integration with popular social networks such as Facebook, Windows Live, and Twitter. For example, the Pictures hub shows photos captured with the device's camera and the user's Facebook photo albums, and the People hub shows contacts aggregated from multiple sources including Windows Live, Facebook, and Gmail. From the hub, users can directly comment and 'like' on social network updates. The other built-in hubs are Xbox Music and Video, Xbox Live Games, Windows Phone Store, and Microsoft Office.

Windows Phone uses multi-touch technology. The default Windows Phone user interface has a dark theme that prolongs battery life on OLED screens as fully black pixels do not emit light. Alternatively, users may choose a light theme in their phone's settings menu. The user may also choose from several accent colors. User interface elements such as links, buttons and tiles are shown in the user's chosen accent color. Third-party applications can be automatically themed with these colors. Windows Phone 8.1 introduces transparent tiles and a customizable background image for the Start screen. The image is visible through the transparent area of the tiles and features a parallax effect when scrolling which gives an illusion of depth. If the user does not pick a background image the tiles render with the accent color of the theme.

=== Text input ===
Users input text by using an on-screen virtual keyboard, which has a dedicated key for inserting emoticons, and features spell checking and word prediction. App developers (both inhouse and ISV) may specify different versions of the virtual keyboard in order to limit users to certain character sets, such as numeric characters alone. Users may change a word after it has been typed by tapping the word, which will invoke a list of similar words. Pressing and holding certain keys will reveal similar characters. The keys are somewhat larger and spaced farther apart when in landscape mode. Phones may also be made with a hardware keyboard for text input. Users can also add accents to letters by holding on an individual letter. Windows Phone 8.1 introduces a new method of typing by swiping through the keyboard without lifting the finger, in a manner similar to Swype and SwiftKey.

=== Web browser ===
Internet Explorer on Windows Phone allows the user to maintain a list of favorite web pages and tiles linking to web pages on the Start screen. The browser supports up to 6 tabs, which can all load in parallel. Other features include multi-touch gestures, smooth zoom in/out animations, the ability to save pictures that are on web pages, share web pages via email, and support for inline search which allows the user to search for a word or phrase in a web page by typing it. Tabs are synced with Windows 8.1 devices using Internet Explorer 11.

=== Contacts ===
Contacts are organized via the "People hub", and can be manually entered into contacts or imported from Facebook, Windows Live Contacts, Twitter, LinkedIn, Google, and Outlook. A "What's New" section shows a user's Facebook news feed and a "Pictures" section show pictures from those social networks, while a "Me" section within the "People" hub shows a user's own social network status and wall and allows them to view social network updates. Contacts can also be pinned to the Start Screen. The contact's "Live Tile" displays their social network status and profile picture on the homescreen. Clicking on a contact's tile or accessing their card within the "People" hub will reveal their recent social network activity as well as the rest of their contact information.

If a contact has information stored on multiple networks, users can link the two separate contact accounts, allowing the information to be viewed and accessed from a single card. As of Windows Phone 7.5, contacts can also be sorted into "Groups". Here, information from each of the contacts is combined into a single page which can be accessed directly from the Hub or pinned to the Start screen.

=== Email ===
Windows Phone supports Outlook.com, Exchange, Yahoo! Mail and Gmail natively and supports many other services via the POP and IMAP protocols. Updates added support for more services such as iCloud and IBM Notes Traveler. Contacts and calendars may be synced from these services as well. Users can also search through their email by searching in the subject, body, senders, and receivers. Emails are shown with threads, and multiple email inboxes can be combined into a single view (a feature commonly referred to as "combined inbox") or can viewed separately.

=== Multimedia ===
The Music + Video Hub on Windows Phone

Xbox Music and Xbox Video are built-in multimedia hubs providing entertainment and synchronization capabilities between PC, Windows Phone, and other Microsoft products. The two hubs were previously combined until standalone apps were released in late 2013, shortly before Windows Phone 8.1 debuted. The hubs allow users to access music, videos, and podcasts stored on the device, and links directly to the "Xbox Music Store" to buy or rent music and the "Xbox Video Store" to purchase movies and TV episodes. Xbox Music also allows the user to stream music with an Xbox Music Pass. When browsing the music by a particular artist, users are able to view artist biographies and photos. The Xbox Music hub also integrates with many other apps that provide video and music services, including, but not limited to, iHeartRadio, YouTube, and Vevo. This hub also includes Smart DJ which compiles a playlist of songs stored on the phone similar to the song or artist selected.

The Pictures hub displays the user's Facebook and OneDrive photo albums, as well as photos taken with the phone's built-in camera. Users can also upload photos to social networks, comment on photos uploaded by other people, and tag photos posted to social networks. Multi-touch gestures permit zooming in and out of photos.

An official file manager app called Files, which is available for download from the Windows Phone Store, enables users to move and rearrange documents, videos, music and other files within their device's hard drive or to an external SD card.

==== Media support ====
Windows Phone supports WAV, MP3, WMA, AMR, AAC/MP4/M4A/M4B and 3GP/3G2 standards. The video file formats supported on WP include WMV, AVI, MP4/M4V, 3GP/3G2 and MOV (QuickTime) standards. These supported audio and video formats would be dependent on the codecs contained inside them. It has also been previously reported that the DivX and Xvid codecs within the AVI file format are also playable on WP devices.

Windows Phone does not support DRM protected media files that are obtained from services other than Xbox Music Pass.

The image file formats that are supported include JPG/JPEG, PNG, GIF, TIF and Bitmap (BMP).

Users can also add custom ringtones which are less than 1MB in size and less than 40 seconds long. DLNA streaming and stereoscopic 3D are also supported.

=== Games ===
The "Games hub" provides access to games on a phone along with Xbox Live functionality, including the ability for a user to interact with their avatar, view and edit their profile, see their achievements and view leaderboards, and send messages to friends on Xbox Live. The hub also features an area for managing invitations and turn notifications in turn-based multiplayer games. Games are downloaded from Windows Phone Store.

=== Search ===
Bing is the default search engine on Windows Phone handsets because its functions are deeply integrated in the OS (which also include the utilization of its map service for location-based searches and queries). However, Microsoft has stated that other search engine applications can be used.

In the area of location-based searches, Bing Maps (which is powered by Nokia's location services) provides turn-by-turn navigation service to Windows Phone users, and Local Scout shows interest points such as attractions and restaurants in the nearby area. On Nokia devices, Nokia's Here Maps is preinstalled in place of Bing Maps.

Furthermore, Bing Audio allows the user to match a song with its name, and Bing Vision allows the user to scan barcodes, QR codes, and other types of tags.

==== Cortana ====
Every Windows Phone has either a dedicated physical Search button or an on-screen Search button, which was previously reserved for a Bing Search app, but has been replaced on Windows Phone 8.1 devices and later in the United Kingdom and United States by Cortana, a digital personal assistant which can also double as an app for basic searches.

Cortana allows users to do tasks such as set calendar reminders and alarms, and recognizes a user's natural voice, and can be used to answer questions (like current weather conditions, sports scores, and biographies). The app also keeps a "Notebook" to learn a user's behavior over time and tailor reminders for them. Users can edit the "Notebook" to keep information from Cortana or reveal more about themselves.

=== Office suite ===
All Windows Phones come preinstalled with Microsoft Office Mobile, which provides interoperability between Windows Phone and the desktop version of Microsoft Office. Word Mobile, Excel Mobile, PowerPoint Mobile, and SharePoint Workspace Mobile apps are accessible through a single "Office Hub", and allow most Microsoft Office file formats to be viewed and edited directly on a Windows Phone device. The "Office Hub" can access files from OneDrive and Office 365, as well as files which are stored locally on the device's hard drive. Although they are not preinstalled in Windows Phone's "Office Hub", OneNote Mobile, Lync Mobile, and OneDrive for Business can be downloaded separately as standalone applications from the Windows Phone Store.

=== Multitasking ===
Multitasking in Windows Phone is invoked through long pressing the "back" arrow, which is present on all Windows Phones. Windows Phone 7 uses a card-based task switcher, whereas later versions of Windows Phone utilize true background multitasking.

=== Sync ===
==== Windows Phone 7 ====
Zune Software manages the contents on Windows Phone 7 devices and Windows Phone can wirelessly sync with Zune Software.

==== Later versions ====
Syncing content between Windows Phone 8 and 8.1 and Windows PCs or Macs is provided through the Windows Phone App, which is available for both Windows and Mac OS X. It is the official successor to Zune software only for Windows Phone 8 and Windows Phone 8.1, and allows users to transfer content such as music, videos, and documents.

Users also have the ability to use a "Tap and Send" feature that allows for file transfer between Windows phones, and NFC-compatible devices through NFC.

=== Updates ===
A test notification of an "update available" pop-up in the Windows Phone emulator

Software updates are delivered to Windows Phone users via Microsoft Update, as is the case with other Windows operating systems. Microsoft initially had the intention to directly update any phone running Windows Phone instead of relying on OEMs or wireless carriers, but on January 6, 2012, Microsoft changed their policy to let carriers decide if an update will be delivered.

While Windows Phone 7 users were required to attach their phones to a PC to install updates, starting with Windows Phone 8, all updates are done via over-the-air downloads. Since Windows Phone 8, Microsoft has also begun releasing minor updates that add features to a current OS release throughout the year. These updates were first labeled "General Distribution releases" (GDRs), but were later rebranded simply as "Updates".

All third-party applications can be updated automatically from the Windows Phone Store.

=== Advertising platform ===
Microsoft has also launched an advertising platform for the Windows Phone platform. Microsoft's General Manager for Strategy and Business Development, Kostas Mallios, said that Windows Phone will be an "ad-serving machine", pushing advertising and brand-related content to the user. The platform will feature advertising tiles near applications and toast notifications, which will bring updating advertising notifications. Mallios said that Windows Phone will be able to "preserve the brand experience by going directly from the web site right to the application", and that Windows Phone "enables advertisers to connect with consumers over time". Mallios continued: "you're now able to push information as an advertiser, and stay in touch with your customer. It's a dynamic relationship that is created and provides for an ongoing dialog with the consumer."

=== Bluetooth ===
Windows Phone supports the following Bluetooth profiles:

1. Advanced Audio Distribution Profile (A2DP 1.2)
2. Audio/Video Remote Control Profile (AVRCP 1.3)
3. Hands Free Profile (HFP 1.5)
4. Headset Profile (HSP 1.1)
5. Phone Book Access Profile (PBAP 1.1)
6. Bluetooth File Transfer (OBEX) (from Windows Phone 7.8)

Windows Phone BTF support is available from Windows Phone 7.8, but is limited to the transferring of pictures, music and videos via a 'Bluetooth Share' app.

=== Feature additions ===
Microsoft kept a site where people can submit and vote on features they would like to see added to Windows Phone.

== Store ==
The Windows Phone Store was used to digitally distribute music, video content, podcasts, and third-party applications to Windows Phone handsets. The store was accessible using the Zune Software client or the Windows Phone Store hub on devices (though videos were not downloadable through the store hub and must be downloaded and synced through the Zune software). The Store was managed by Microsoft, which included an approval process. As of March 2012, the Windows Phone Store was available in 54 countries.

=== Music and videos ===
Xbox Music offered approximately 50 million songs up to 320 kbit/s in DRM-free MP3 format from the big four music groups (EMI, Warner Music Group, Sony BMG and Universal Music Group), as well as smaller music labels. Xbox Video offered HD movies from Paramount, Universal, Warner Brothers, and other studios and plus television shows from popular television networks.

Microsoft offered the Xbox Music Pass music subscription service, which allowed subscribers to download an unlimited number of songs for as long as their subscription was active and play them on current Microsoft devices.

=== Applications and games ===
==== Development ====
Third-party applications and games for Windows Phone can be based on XNA, a Windows Phone-specific version of Silverlight, the GUI-based Windows Phone App Studio, or the Windows Runtime, which allows developers to develop an app for both the Windows Store and Windows Phone Store simultaneously. App developers can develop apps using C# / Visual Basic.NET (.NET), C++ (CX) or HTML5/JavaScript.

For Windows Phone apps to be designed and tested within Visual Studio or Visual Studio Express, Microsoft offers Windows Phone Developer Tools, which run only on Windows Vista SP2 and later, as an extension Microsoft also offers Expression Blend for Windows Phone for free. On November 29, 2009, Microsoft announced the Release-to-web (RTW) version of its Visual Basic .NET Developer Tool, to aid development of Windows Phone apps in Visual Basic.

Later versions of Windows Phone support the running of managed code through a Common Language Runtime similar to that of the Windows operating system itself, as opposed to the .NET Compact Framework. This, along with support for native C and C++ libraries, allows some traditional Windows desktop programs to be easily ported to Windows Phone.

==== Submission ====
Registered Windows Phone and Xbox Live developers can submit and manage their third-party applications for the platforms through the App Hub web applications. The App Hub provides development tools and support for third-party application developers. The submitted applications undergo an approval process for verifications and validations to check if they qualify the applications standardization criteria set by Microsoft. The cost of the applications that are approved is up to the developer, but Microsoft will take 20% of the revenue (the other 80% goes to the developer). Microsoft will only pay developers once they reach a set sales figure, and will withhold 30% tax from non-US developers, unless they first register with the United States Government's Internal Revenue Service. Microsoft only pays developers from a list of thirty countries. A yearly fee is also payable for developers wishing to submit apps.

In order to get an application to appear in the Windows Phone Store, the application must be submitted to Microsoft for approval. Microsoft has outlined the content that it will not allow in the applications, which includes content that, among other things, advocates discrimination or hate, promotes usage of drugs, alcohol or tobacco, or includes sexually suggestive material.

== Hardware ==
Windows Phone 7 devices were first produced by HTC, LG and Samsung. These hardware partners were later joined by Acer, Alcatel, Fujitsu, Toshiba, Nokia, and Chinese OEM ZTE.

Windows Phone 8 devices were being produced by HTC, Huawei, Nokia, and Samsung.

At the 2014 Mobile World Congress, Microsoft announced that upcoming Windows Phone 8.1 devices would be manufactured by Celkon, Gionee, HTC, Huawei, JSR, Karbonn, LG, Lenovo, Longcheer, Micromax, Microsoft Mobile, Samsung, Xolo, and ZTE among others. Sony (under the Xperia or Vaio brand) had also stated its intention to produce Windows Phone devices in the near future. Yezz announced two smartphones in May, and at Computex 2014 BYD, Compal, Pegatron, Quanta and Wistron were also named as new Windows Phone OEMs.

In August 2014, Huawei said it was dropping support for Windows Phone due to low sales.

== Reception ==
=== User interface ===
The Metro UI and overall interface of the OS were highly praised for their style, with ZDNet noting their originality and fresh, clean look. Engadget and ZDNet applauded the integration of Facebook into the People Hub as well as other built-in capabilities, such as Windows Live, etc. However, in version 8.1, the once tight Facebook and Twitter integration was removed, so updates from those social media sites had to be accessed via their respective apps.

=== Market share ===
View chart definition.

==== Windows Phone 7 (2010–2012) ====
For the first months, market specialists were optimistic about its adoption, with IDC forecasting that Windows Phone would surpass the iPhone by 2015.

According to Gartner, there were 1.6 million devices running Microsoft OS sold to customers in Q1 2011 worldwide. 1.7 million smartphones using a Microsoft mobile OS were sold in Q2 2011, for a 1.6% market share. In Q3 2011, Microsoft's worldwide market share dropped slightly to 1.5%. In Q4 2011, market share increased to 1.9%, and it stayed at 1.9% for Q1 2012. Reports for Q2, Q3 and Q4 of year 2011 include both Windows Phone and a small part of the Windows Mobile market share under the same "Microsoft mobile OS" banner, without distinguishing between their component values. According to Nielsen, Windows Phone had a 1.7% market share in Q1 2012, and then dropped back to 1.3% in Q2 2012.

==== Windows Phone 8 (2012–2015) ====
After the release of Windows Phone 8, Gartner reported that Windows Phone's market share jumped to 3% in Q4 2012, a 124% increase over the same time period in 2011.

In mid-2012, IDC had suggested that Windows Phone might surpass the faltering BlackBerry platform and potentially even Apple iOS because of Nokia's dominance in emerging markets like Asia, Latin America, and Africa, as the iPhone was considered too expensive for most of these regions and BlackBerry OS was possibly going to feature a similar fate as Symbian. IDC's projections were partially correct, as in Q1 2013 Windows Phone shipments surpassed BlackBerry shipment volume for the first time. IDC had to slash the Windows Phone predictions once again, to 7 percent of total market in 2018, because of the slow growth.

As of the third quarter of 2013, Gartner reported that Windows Phone holds a worldwide market share of 3.6%, up 123% from the same period in 2012 and outpacing Android's rate of growth. According to Kantar's October 2013 report, Windows Phone accounted for 10.2% of all smartphone sales in Europe and 4.8% of all sales in the United States. Some analysts have been attributing this spike in sales to both Windows Phone 8 and Nokia's successful push to market low and mid-range Windows Phones like the Lumia 520 and Lumia 620 to a younger audience. Gartner reported that Windows Phone market share finished 2013 at 3.2%, which while down from the third quarter of 2013 was still a 46.7% improvement from the same period in 2012.

IDC reported that Windows Phone market share, having peaked in 2013 at 3.4%, had dropped to 2.5% by the second quarter of 2014.

In August 2017, the New York Police Department ordered Apple iPhone products to replace its deployment of 36,000 Lumia 830 and Lumia 640 XL Windows Phone devices, partly citing Microsoft's end of support for Windows Phone 8.1 on July 11, 2017, and its minuscule market share.

=== Developer interest ===
Microsoft's developer initiative programs and marketing have gained attention from application developers. As of Q3 2013, an average of 21% of mobile developers used the Windows Phone platform, with another 35% stating they were interested in adopting it. Some reports have indicated that developers may be less interested in developing for Windows Phone because of the lower ad revenue when compared to competing platforms. The main criticism of Windows Phone was the lack of applications when compared to iOS and Android. This also affected Microsoft's largest partner in the platform, Nokia, whose vice president showed his frustration at the lack of apps for the platform.

A few developers refused to develop apps while preventing third-party alternatives. A well-known example was Snapchat, which announced a crackdown on third-party apps for its service and its users in November 2014. Microsoft was forced to remove third-party Snapchat apps (including the popular 6snap) from the Windows Phone Store a month later, while Snapchat never developed an official app for those users. A petition from users requesting an official Snapchat app reached 43,000 signatures in 2015. In addition, Google twice blocked Microsoft's own YouTube app for violating its terms of service, objecting to the app's ability to download videos and prevent ads. The app returned in October 2013 but stripped of many features.

By 2014, Windows Phone was losing share and relevance; between 2014 and 2015, it was reported that developers were backing out of the platform and retiring apps because of the low market share. Many high-profile apps were discontinued by 2015 such as American Airlines, NBC, Pinterest and others. In addition, Microsoft itself retired some of its own first-party apps.

== See also ==
- Comparison of mobile operating systems
- Surface Duo
