= Windows Phone version history =

This page provides details for the version history of the Microsoft's Windows Phone branded mobile operating systems, from the release of Windows Phone 7 in October 2010, which was preceded by Windows Mobile version 6.x.

== Windows Phone 7 ==
Windows Phone 7 was the first release of the Windows Phone mobile client operating system, released worldwide on October 21, 2010, and in the United States on November 8, 2010.

Windows Phone 7 version history
Version	Release date	Changes
7.0.7004	October 29, 2010	Initial version of the Windows Phone 7 OS
7.0.7008	2010	Improved update process for future update
7.0.7390 (NoDo)	March 22, 2011	Added CDMA support, Copy and Paste, fast application startup, and deeper Facebook Integration
7.0.7392	2011	Revoke of fraudulent certificates
7.0.7403	2011	Intermediate update required for updating to Mango

== Windows Phone 7.5 ==
Logo used for Windows Phone 7.5 and Windows Phone 7.8

At the 2011 Mobile World Congress, Steve Ballmer announced a major update to Windows Phone 7 due toward the end of the year, Windows Phone 7.5, codenamed Mango. The new OS would address many of the platform's shortcomings, including a mobile version of Internet Explorer 9 that supports the same web standards and graphical capability as the desktop version, multi-tasking of third-party apps, Twitter integration for the People Hub, and Windows Live SkyDrive access. Although the OS internally identifies itself as version 7.1, it is marketed as version 7.5 in all published materials intended for end-users.

Microsoft started rolling out Windows Phone 7.5 to both the United States and International markets on September 27, 2011. The first phones that came pre-loaded with Windows Phone 7.5 were released in the last quarter of 2011.

A minor update released in 2012 known as Tango, along with other bug fixes, would also lower the hardware requirements to allow for devices with 800 MHz CPUs and 256 MB of RAM to run Windows Phone. Certain resource-intensive features are also disabled on these phones, and the Windows Phone Store will also prevent the installation of apps that are considered to be too intensive for use on weaker hardware. The lower requirements were adopted in order to allow the development of lower-cost devices, particularly to target emerging markets such as China.

Windows Phone 7.5 version history
Version	Release date	Changes
7.10.7720 (Mango)	September 27, 2011	Messaging and social integration; Dynamic Live tile information; Twitter and LinkedIn integration in the People hub.; Groups: organize contacts by groups which can also be pinned on the start screen.; Contact cards now include all the contacts conversation history (SMS, emails, MMS, Messenger, etc.); Facebook Places check-in support.; Windows Live Messenger and Facebook Chat integration.; Threads: all messaging communication organized in a single thread (Messenger, SMS, MMS).; Threaded email conversations support.; Outlook tasks support.; Facebook events integrated into the calendar.; Linked email accounts: multiple email accounts can be combined and linked into one inbox.; Built-in voice-to-text/text-to-voice functionality, which will allow for hands-free texting or chatting.; Server search for Exchange.; Information Rights Management support for emails and Office documents.; Visual Voicemail; Search/Bing; Bing Vision: barcode, covers, posters, products scanning, and OCR text translation.; Bing Audio / Music: Shazam-like audio recognition.; Bing Local Scout: "around me" business and POI locator.; Bing Quick Cards: product/media information, reviews.; Bing Search: indoor maps (US only), image search results, third-party app integration.; Bing Maps: turn-by-turn navigation, voice guidance.; Microsoft Office Mobile; Skydrive and Office 365 documents sync (PDF also supported).; Excel Mobile now supports adding additional macro functions.; Microsoft Lync support via downloadable app.; Added "To-Do" option when editing OneNote pages.; Removed ability to edit Office documents from versions older than Office 2007.; Photo management; People / Groups gallery with Skydrive and Facebook sync.; People tagging in the photos with Skydrive and Facebook sync.; Photo auto-fix - automatically improves sharpness, brightness, etc.; Pictures tile is now animated.; Video sharing via MMS, Facebook, Skydrive, and email.; Twitter integration—Tweet your pics!; Integration with the People Hub.; Quick access to the Camera Roll.; When you choose a photo from within an app, you can now pick from online albums on Facebook or SkyDrive, not just pictures saved on your phone.; Pin any album to Start, including Facebook albums.; Multimedia; Zune SmartDJ mix support.; Artist picture now displays on lock screen when music is played.; UI change of the media controls on the lock screen.; Ability to control video aspect ratio during playback.; Single music track repeat without having to pin it on the start screen.; Podcast downloads / subscriptions over the air (US only).; Open / play media content by voice.; Ability to create and save playlists.; Marketplace; Revamped Marketplace UI and search.; Camera; UI changes (new icons + added arrow icon on the lower left of the viewfinder to indicate camera roll).; Settings are now saved when the Camera application is closed.; Disable/enable shutter sound.; Support for front facing camera.; Touch focus and capture—Tap any spot on the screen to focus there and take the shot. (This varies according to hardware—some phones will have tap-to-capture but will still automatically center focus.); Review pictures above the lock—Snap a photo when your phone is locked, then take a peek at it above the lock. You’ll only be able to get to photos you just took—better for security.; Changes for portrait orientation—Now, when you take a picture in portrait orientation, you’ll see it in portrait orientation when you review it.; Games; Redesigned Xbox LIVE Games hub with integrated 3D avatar and avatar customization.; Friends and achievements now integrated in the hub.; Fast Async for multiplayer games.; Internet Explorer 9 Mobile; Hardware-accelerated rendering.; Support for HTML5 audio and video playback.; Background HTML5 audio playback.; Geolocation support.; New JavaScript engine.; New UI with URL bar at the bottom of the screen.; URL bar is now available in landscape mode.; Removal of Find on Page feature; Moved the "tabs" button to a menu item under the application bar.; Security; Voice commands are now disabled when the device is locked.; Complex (alpha-numeric) PIN support.; Other changes; Internet sharing; Battery saver: phone automatically disables power consuming services and applications running in the background if the battery is low. Also predicts time remaining on battery.; Ringtone manager with custom and downloadable ringtones.; The "People" tile has been reworked and is animated differently than before.; Search icon and quick jump list added to the application list.; Support for 16 new languages: Czech, Danish, Hungarian, Dutch (Netherlands), Norwegian, Polish, Portuguese (Brazil, Portugal), Finnish, Swedish, Greek, Russian, Korean, Chinese (Traditional, Simplified), Japanese.; East Asian handwriting recognition.; Support for new languages and emoticons in on-screen keyboard.; Hidden WiFi network support.; Qualcomm MSM7X30 and MSM8X55 support.; Programs menu will have alphabetical options similar to the people functionality; Power off now requires a swipe down gesture after holding down the power button for a few seconds.; Removal of "soft-on" alarm feature; Modification of alarm sleep interval; Development API changes and additions; Third-party application multi-tasking and fast application switching.; Support for background tasks and services/agents.; Expanded live tiles that can be updated without network connection and can have two sides which flip periodically.; App Connect: third-party applications can integrate with Bing search, have multiple live tiles, and can have push notifications that link deep ("Deep Toast") into various parts of the application directly.; Optional 32 bit color support for Silverlight applications with hardware dithering.; Silverlight 4 support.; Silverlight + XNA support in the same application screen.; Raw camera feed access for third-party applications.; New sensor API combines compass, gyroscope, and accelerometer.; Improved Listbox control with better scrolling performance.; Improved WebBrowser control with IE9 rendering engine and system-wide cookies access.; Clipboard API.; Hardware-accelerated video decoding in the MediaPlayer control.; TCP/IP and UDP sockets support.; Embedded database with LINQ (based on SQL Server Compact 4.0 engine, but without direct SQL execution).; Background file transfer agent.; Generational garbage collector.; NEON/SIMD support for XNA applications.
7.10.7740	2011	Fixed email issue in Microsoft Exchange Server 2003; Fixed voicemail notification issue.
7.10.8107 (Refresh)	2011	LTE support; Fixed keyboard disappearing bug; Fixed location access issue; Other bugfixes
7.10.8112	2012	Initial release for AT&T Nokia Lumia 900 & HTC Titan II.
7.10.8773.98 (Tango)	June 28, 2012	Better media messaging; Ability to send ringtones via MMS; Export and manage contacts to SIM card; Support for low-cost devices with 256 MB RAM and low clock CPU.; New wallpapers; Letter indexing; More reliable notifications; Attachment download with Microsoft Exchange 2003 Server; Faster numeric PIN response; Location awareness icon; Minor improvements and changes; Also confirmed are 23 additional markets including; Bahrain, Bulgaria, China, Costa Rica, Croatia, Estonia, Iceland, Iraq, Israel, Kazakhstan, Latvia, Lithuania, Qatar, Romania, Saudi Arabia, Slovakia, Slovenia, Thailand, Turkey, UAE, Ukraine, Venezuela and Vietnam. This update will also include a Skype application. The Nokia Lumia 610 and ZTE Orbit, introduced at Mobile World Congress in 2012, are the first phones to run the Tango update.
7.10.8779.8		Fixes an issue with app purchases in some regions.; Changes default sync times for email.
7.10.8783.12		Provides other Windows Phone improvements.

== Windows Phone 7.8 ==
Windows Phone 7.8 is the final major release of Windows Phone 7. It consists exclusively of user interface improvements backported from Windows Phone 8, as existing Windows Phone 7 devices cannot be upgraded due to changes to its architecture and hardware requirements. These include a home screen with the ability to resize live tiles, new accent color options, and an updated lock screen with support for Bing wallpapers. Unlike Windows Phone 8, the lock screen does not allow third-party apps to display notifications on it. However, the Internet Explorer Mobile of Windows Phone 7.8 still remained to Internet Explorer Mobile 9, and Windows Phone 7.8 cannot install or run apps designed for Windows Phone 8.

Windows Phone 7.8 version history
Version	Release date	Changes
7.10.8858.136	February 1–2, 2013	New start screen UI with customizable sizes of the tiles, as found in Windows Phone 8; New splash screen at startup, the phone displays the new logo of Windows Phone 8; New logo for basic applications such as Games, Office, Windows Phone Store; 20 accent colors (one for the manufacturer or the operator), as Windows Phone 8; Improved lock screen similar to Windows Phone 8, presence of dynamic wallpaper (Bing) notifications and probably third-party applications; Volume control problems; Data consumption issues with certain apps
7.10.8860.142	March 14, 2013	Intermediate update; Features "several quality improvements"; Enabled Tethering Wi-Fi in Samsung Omnia GT-I8350
7.10.8862.144	March 14, 2013	Fix for functionality issues with Live Tiles, such as Live Tiles not updating; Details of all updates included in this release at http://www.windowsphone.com/en-gb/how-to/wp7/basics/update-history

== Windows Phone 8 ==
Logo used for Windows Phone 8 and Windows Phone 8.1

=== GDR1 ===
General Distribution Release 1, a minor update known as Portico was rolled out in December 2012 that brought some improvements and bugfixes, including enhancements in Messaging, more efficient Bluetooth connectivity, and an "always-on" setting for WiFi connections, among other additional platform updates

=== GDR2 ===
Microsoft rolled out a package of minor updates called General Distribution Release 2, beginning in July 2013 and spanning the following months, depending on the manufacturer and carrier. Along with this update Nokia released its own update which updated the firmware of the user, namely Lumia Amber, which was available for only Lumia phones. The update brought many camera improvements and fixed some bugs in the cameras of existing Lumia phones.

=== GDR3 ===
On October 14, 2013, Microsoft released the third General Distribution Release update for Windows Phone 8, which would roll out to phones over the following months. Windows Phone Developers were among the first to receive the update under a new Developer Preview Program.

=== Version history ===
Windows Phone 8 version history
Version	Release date	Highlights
8.0.9903.10 (Apollo)	October 29, 2012	Transitions to core components from Windows 8, including kernel, file system, drivers, network stack, security components, media and graphics support; Support for multi-core CPUs of up to 64 cores (system is currently optimized for Snapdragon S4 dual and quad core processors); Support for WXGA (1280×720, 1280×768) resolutions; Support for MicroSD cards; Internet Explorer 10; Background multitasking (enhanced); NFC support added, including payment and content sharing with WP8 and Windows 8 machines (NFC is partially supported in Tango update, e.g., ZTE Orbit); Native code support (C and C++), simplified porting from platforms such as Android, Symbian, and iOS (Native code is also supported in WP7 for vendors, carriers and key partners); Simplified porting of Windows 8 apps to Windows Phone 8 (compatibility with Windows 8 'Modern UI' apps); Carrier control and branding of "wallet" element is possible via SIM or phone hardware (Orange will be first); Nokia map technology (Navteq maps with offline mode, turn-by-turn directions); Native 128-bit Bitlocker encryption, Secure Boot; Remote device management of Windows Phone similar to management of Windows PCs; VoIP and video chat integration for any VoIP or video chat app (integrates into the phone dialer, people hub); In-app purchases; Firmware over the air for Windows Phone updates; Minimum 18 month support of Windows Phone updates to WP8 devices; Camera app now supports "lenses", which allow third parties to skin and add features to camera interface; Camera burst mode that let users choose the best picture from a series of pictures; Camera panoramic setting using Microsoft's PhotoSynth technology; Possibility to take screenshots; Deeper SkyDrive integration, including ability to sync data such as music collections; Data Sense tracks and reports data usage, lowers data usage when nearing pre-set data cap, enables compression of websites through cloud service, locates WiFi hotspots; Scrapped Zune desktop software for syncing; Kids corner; Rooms; Live Apps
8.0.10211.204 (GDR1)	December 11, 2012	Messaging improvements - multiple recipients when sending messages, automatically saving unsent drafts, possibility to edit forwarded messages; Text replies to incoming calls; Internet Explorer improvements - prevent pictures from downloading automatically, possibility to delete selected sites from browsing history; Wi-Fi connectivity - option of keeping WiFi alive while screen is off, Wi-Fi network prioritization; Other unnamed improvements
8.0.10327.77 8.0.10328.78 (GDR2)	July 12, 2013	Google accounts. Windows Phone 8 now supports the CardDAV and CalDAV protocols that allow people to sync Google contacts and calendar information when they get new phones.; Xbox Music. Easier to select, download, and pin music. More accurate metadata and other performance improvements.; FM radio. Possible to listen to FM radio from the Music+Videos hub. (Not available for all phones.); Data Sense. Possible to set a limit based on the data plan (already included since initial release for Verizon subscribers); Skype. Voice over Internet Protocol (VoIP) apps like Lync and Skype features improved stability and performance.; Internet Explorer. Better browsing experience with improved HTML 5 compatibility.; Camera. Set favorite Lens so it opens automatically when pressing the camera button. (Not available for all phones.); Other improvements. Includes many other improvements to Windows Phone.
8.0.10512.142; 8.0.10501.127; 8.0.10517.150; 8.0.10521.155 (GDR3)	October 14, 2013	Support for large displays and start screen with six tiles across instead of four (only for supported devices); 1080p screen resolution support; Support for Qualcomm Snapdragon 800 SoC (Quad-core CPU); New Driving Mode feature to ignore texts, calls and quick status alerts, plus auto-reply via SMS to people trying to contact you; Accessibility improvements for visually impaired; Improved Internet Sharing (pair over bluetooth with Windows 8.1 devices and ICS is set up automatically); Ability to leverage custom notification sounds, including instant messages, emails, voicemails, reminders and custom ringtones to contacts for text messages; Screen Rotation lock; Better storage management; Ability to close applications in app switcher; Wi-Fi access during phone set up; Bluetooth bug fixes and improvements to connection quality for Bluetooth accessories; "Hundreds of under-the-hood performance tweaks and enhancements"
8.0.10532.166	April 14, 2014	Preparation for Windows Phone 8.1 upgrade

== Windows Phone 8.1 ==
=== GDR1 ===
General Distribution Release 1 (GDR1; also referred to as Update 1) adds new language and region support for Cortana, the option to organize apps into folders on the Start Screen, SMS forwarding of multiple messages, improvements to Xbox Music, a live tile for the Windows Phone Store and an option for sandboxing applications. In addition, Update 1/GDR1 also includes new VPN and Bluetooth features for enterprise users, as well as support for interactive cases such as HTC's "Dot View" case, larger "phablet" screen resolutions such as 1280x800, 540x960 qHD and 1280x768 and the Qualcomm QuickCharge 2.0 standard.

Microsoft has made several changes to Internet Explorer Mobile that brings the browser experience closer in line with the experiences on Safari (iOS) and Chrome (Android). To accomplish this, Microsoft moved away from open standards and adopted non-standard features used in Safari and Chrome, implemented browser detection, improved page rendering by detecting legacy WebKit features, brought support for HTML5, and fixed interoperability issues with bad HTML code.

An example for the comparison of the changes made to the user-agent string in Update 1/GDR1 in order to overcome erroneous methods of browser detection and correctly deliver mobile content to Internet Explorer Mobile.

IE11 on Windows Phone 8.1:
Mozilla/5.0 (Windows Phone 8.1; ARM; Trident/7.0; Touch; rv:11; IEMobile/11.0; NOKIA; Lumia 928) like Gecko

IE11 on Windows Phone 8.1 with Update 1/GDR1:
Mozilla/5.0 (Mobile; Windows Phone 8.1; Android 4.0; ARM; Trident/7.0; Touch; rv:11.0; IEMobile/11.0; NOKIA; Lumia 720) like iPhone OS 7_0_3 Mac OS X AppleWebKit/537 (KHTML, like Gecko) Mobile Safari/537

=== GDR2 ===
Information regarding GDR2 (also referred to as Update 2) was released in February 2015 it was revealed that Microsoft was working on a 2nd update for Windows Phone 8.1 that would provide increased security for OEM's, add extra languages and additional technology support and is also reported to bring an anti-theft mode.

=== Version history ===
Windows Phone 8.1 version history
Version	Release date	Highlights
8.10.12359.845 (Blue)	April 14, 2014	User Interface: Action Center showing either standard or silent toast notifications, accessed by swiping from top to the bottom; Quick settings access in action center with four (or five on large screens like 6 inch Nokia Lumia 1520) configurable shortcuts to: Airplane mode, bluetooth, brightness, camera, internet sharing, location, project screen, Quiet Hours, rotation lock, VPN, Wi-Fi [items in this list cannot be changed]; Start screen backgrounds; Support for start screen live tile rows of up to 6 small or 3 medium live tiles; 'Cortana' smart personal assistant, based on the Bing service [available only on limited number of markets]; Swipe down to close apps in multitasking view; Recently installed apps are annotated with 'NEW' in the app list; Support for virtual on-screen buttons called 'Navigation bar' with custom background color selection; Gesture keyboard, that is, swipe across letters on keyboard to type (Shape Writing) [not available on all languages / keyboards types]; General user experience changes: Bing smart search (similar search system as Windows 8.1); Back button doesn't close application; Contact speed dialling; Ability to show only Contacts with phone number; Contacts with 'Inner Circle'; up to 40 Contacts (requires Cortana support); Double-Tap to unlock your phone (Feature from Lumia devices on Amber Update and newer); Favourite photos by tapping a heart icon; General keyboard enhancements including show emoji when typing and recognize names of Contacts; In-call speech commands; Notification if charger isn't of adequate power; Quiet Hours - Disable notifications during pre-selected time-frame or when 'Busy' in calendar (requires Cortana); Screenshot button combination is now Power + Volume Up; Search button will be the new way to open Speech (aka ‘Cortana’); Separate volume controls for ringtones/notifications and music/media; Set default Voice Navigation app for the OS; Voice Narrator for Accessibility; File picker; Wi-Fi Sense: sharing secured Wi-Fi Networks with contacts if they have Wi-Fi Sense; Wi-Fi can auto re-enable after a set duration of time; Status bar with Signal strength, Wi-Fi, Battery etc. is always visible (doesn't auto-hide); Phone history group repeat calls from a user annotated with number of calls; New technology support: VPN (Virtual Private Network), auto-triggered VPN; Enterprise Wi-Fi support with EAP-TLS; Miracast; PlayTo and mirroring of Windows Phone screen to TVs and/or monitors; Bluetooth 4.0 LE (requires phone firmware support, temporarily removed from DP version); Dual SIM; Mouse and keyboard (HID) (in fact there is no HID support in WP 8.1 currently, true HID support is expected in WP 8.1 GDR2 somewhere in middle of 2015); Support for Qualcomm Snapdragon 200/400/400 LTE; Full support for TD-LTE and SGLTE; Internet Explorer 11: WebGL; Normal mapping; File uploads; File downloads to local storage; Password manager; Video player including HTML5 video support (video playback doesn't have to be full screen); Tab, history, favorites and password synchronization with Internet Explorer 11 in Windows 8.1; Forward and back by swiping right and left; Apps: Ability to install apps, save photos, app and game data on inserted SD Cards (apps on SD Cards only allowed from one originating phone); Auto-updates for apps (like Windows 8.1), including when only on Wi-Fi; App Suggestions by location; Better backup functionality including app and game data to OneDrive (if developer enabled); Battery power sense, monitors app battery usage; Battery Saver (under Battery Sense) will have an app exclusion list; Single sign-in for apps (like on Windows 8) with Microsoft Account; sign in will persist across devices + apps with permissions prompt; Podcast app powered by Bing, full featured; Facebook and OneDrive photos integration in photos app removed; Office apps support password protected documents; Office Lens support for scanning documents with camera, import into Office with OCR; OneDrive (previously SkyDrive) with integrated file browser (like Windows 8.1); Twitter integrated more deeply into the contacts Hub; Updated calendar app with weather for days and week view; Updated camera app, similar to Windows 8.1, with burst mode.; Updated email app with ability to always download emails and pictures within them, sync with accordance to usage patterns; Updated messaging app with ability to mute thread; Xbox Music and Xbox Video as standalone apps instead of the Music + Video Hub (allowing more updates to be pushed); Xbox Game Hub redesigned; System: Chkdsk for SD cards to ensure card health; The phone will have to update to the latest version before you can restore it to factory settings; Trusted app list for NFC that will remove the need for asking whether you want to open a particular app; Virtual SmartCard support; Wallet supports tickets, membership cards, and Passbook; Ability for operators to install certain applications once SIM card is detected; Ability for operators to control Data Sense limits remotely; Enterprise: S/MIME to sign and encrypt email; Enterprise enrolled phones can have their passwords changed and remotely locked; Access to corporate resources behind the firewall with app aware; Certificate management to enroll, update and revoke certificates for user authentication; Enhanced MDM policies to lock down functionality on the phone for more enterprise control, in addition to richer application management such as allowing or denying the installing of certain apps.; Developer features: Background tasks: Bluetooth signal strength, Chat message notification, Device connection change, Device use trigger, Gatt characteristic notification, Location, Push notification, Rfcomm connection, System event, Timer; Geofencing API for location-based reminders; Native HTML5/JavaScript app development support; Audio/video transcoding (same API as in WinRT), hardware accelerated; Media editing: audio and video effects; slow motion video; Apps can capture audio/video from themselves; New APPX app package format for new Windows Phone 8.1 apps, similar to Windows 8.1 APPX format; Stereoscopic 3D support; New developer tools including: SemanticZoom, DatePicker, TimePicker
8.10.12382.878	May 14, 2014	Intermediate update; Features "several quality improvements"
8.10.12393.890	June 2, 2014	Change in Boot Logo; Some minor bug fixes; Battery improvement
8.10.12397.895	June 12, 2014	Improvements to APIs; Enables new devices
8.10.12400.899	July 16, 2014	
8.10.14141.167		
8.10.14147.180 (GDR1)	August 4, 2014	Apps: New country support for Cortana; China, UK, Canada, India and Australia; Support for a store live tile when the tile is medium-sized; Store tile size has been standardized for all layouts and some tiles have changed places on the Start screen.; Improved Xbox music app and live tile support.; Support for app folders.; Enable phone cover apps to launch when a phone cover is closed and specify the default setting for the lock screen's auto unlock setting.; SMS merge & forwarding; Apps Corner; specify which apps are displayed in a special sandboxed mode or boot straight to an app; Hundreds of Internet Explorer 11 enhancements that greatly increase compatibility with the mobile web; General user experience changes: Add phone book entry for Cortana to allow users to initiate speech from a car that doesn't have support for activating speech on the phone that is connected over Bluetooth.; USB action choices; User-customizable snooze settings for alarms; Improved selection, possibility to delete multiple calls, messages or contacts; Support for password protected office documents; New technology support: Dual SIM CDMA + GSM radio support; Bluetooth PAN (personal area network) 1.0 profile; Bluetooth aptX codec support for A2DP; Bluetooth browsing support for AVRCP; Bluetooth accessory notifications; Network Time Protocol support; automatically set the time using an NTP client in a Windows Phone device that doesn't support NITZ or when cellular data is not available.; Voice over LTE (VoLTE) support; Support for Qualcomm Quick charge 2.0, up to 75% faster charging in supported devices (Snapdragon 400, 600 and 800); Enterprise: Send and receive data through a virtual private network (VPN) when connecting to Wi-Fi hotspots; Support for L2TP VPN protocol with IPsec; OEM: Support for notification LED; Support for custom lock screens; Support for 1280 x 800 WXGA resolution; 540 x 960 qHD resolution support for diagonal screen sizes up to 6"; 1280 x 768 WXGA resolution support for diagonal screen sizes of 6.01" to 7; Possibility to install Wi-Fi Feature Pack which removes all cellular-related functionality from the operating system
8.10.14157.200	August 19, 2014	Bug Fixes
8.10.14176.243	September 24, 2014	Fixes error 80188308 some users were experiencing during update ( works in HTC 8X India model- in preview for developers ); HTC Windows Phones 8X, 8S, and 8XT will now be able to get the Windows Phone 8.1 Update; Fixes an Access Violation in "minuser" component which caused WinRT apps and WebViews to crash if scrolled by the user while (or 2–15 seconds after) loading, which was a regression introduced in the 8.1 Update 1 release (8.10.14147.180).
8.10.14192.280	October 24, 2014	Tests Microsoft's ability to distribute a "Critical Update". Note that this update does not actually contain critical fixes - it's just a test.
8.10.14203.306	November 13, 2014	"Critical Update" for unstated reasons; Allows for real-time Live Tile for the Battery Saver App (also allows you to add Battery Saver to the Quick Settings found in the Action and Notification Center); Adds preferred install time for automatic updates; Made NTP time sync support enabled by default for CV devices (instead of rely on OEM to enable it)
8.10.14219.341	December 5, 2014	New country support for Cortana; Spain, France, Germany and Italy (alpha). (However, due to a widespread bug in the deployment, Cortana is not available for many users); Cellular Data Toggle for Quick Settings access in Action Center.; Support for offline maps storage on MicroSD card; Hardware keyboard support; Ability to use the SD card storage space temporarily for OS updates (must be enabled in the ROM)
8.10.14226.359	December 24, 2014	Fixes screen issues on the Microsoft Lumia 535
8.10.14234.375	February 24, 2015	Fixes screen issues on the Microsoft Lumia 535 (not be solved with the previous update)
8.10.15116.125 (GDR2)	March 2, 2015	General user experience changes: Additional language support (Bangla, Khmer, Kiswahili, Lao); All apps button at bottom of start screen; Ability to rename the phone from the About section, without the need for connecting to the PC via USB; Double-tap on navigation bar to turn off screen; Settings categorized and searchable; New technology support: Bluetooth Message Access Profile; Bluetooth Human Interface Device Profile 1.1; Bluetooth HID over Generic Attribute Profile; Absolute Volume Control (part of AVRCP); Video over LTE; MKV video container support; Security features: Anti-theft reset protection; Customizable app permissions for calendar, camera, contacts, messages and microphone
8.10.15127.138	March 2015	Anti-theft reset protection (available only for new phones running build 8.10.15127.138)
8.10.15135.146	March 2015	
8.10.15137.148	March 2015	
8.10.15143.154	April 2015	
8.10.15145.156	April 2015	
8.10.15148.160	May 2015	Voice over LTE support enabled for selected operators.; Native Wi-Fi calling support enabled for EE UK and T-Mobile USA.; Additional improvements to stability, audio quality, Wi-Fi and cellular connectivity, national roaming, and more.
8.10.15153.165	June 2015	
8.10.15155.167	July 2015	
8.10.15156.168	January 2016	
8.10.15165.177	August 2016	
8.10.15172.184	March 2017	Only includes keyboard and speech files
8.10.15176.188	December 2017	Only includes keyboard and speech files
8.10.15185.197	November 2018	Only includes keyboard and speech files
8.10.15191.203	June 2019	Only includes keyboard and speech files

== Windows 10 Mobile ==
Logo used for Windows 10 and Windows 10 Mobile

Windows 10 Mobile was announced on January 21, 2015, as a mobile operating system for smartphones and tablets with screens smaller than 8 inches, with the first build released on February 12, 2015. It is the successor to Windows Phone 8.1 and replaced the Windows Phone brand, while Microsoft has since ceased active development of Windows 10 Mobile. Windows Phone 8.1 devices were eligible for upgrade to Windows 10, pursuant of manufacturer and carrier support. Some features may have varied depending on hardware compatibility.

== See also ==
- Android version history
- BlackBerry 10 version history
- Firefox OS version history
- iOS version history
- Palm OS version history
- Sailfish OS version history
- Symbian version history
- Tizen version history
