= Windows Insider =

Open software testing program by Microsoft

- The Windows Insider logo represents the three main channels of development.
- Developer: Microsoft
- Launched: October 1, 2014; 11 years ago
- Operating systems: Windows 10, Windows 11
- Status: Active
- Members: 10 million
- Website: Official website

Windows Insider is an open software testing program by Microsoft that allows users globally who own a valid license of Windows 11, Windows 10, or Windows Server to register for pre-release builds of the operating system previously only accessible to software developers.

Microsoft launched Windows Insider for developers, enterprise testers and the "technically able" to test new developer features on pre-release software and builds to gather low level diagnostics feedback in order to identify, investigate, mitigate and improve Windows 10, with the help, support and guidance of the Insider program Participants, in direct communication with Microsoft Engineers via a proprietary communication and diagnostic channel.

It was announced on September 30, 2014, along with Windows 10. By September 2015, over 7 million people took part in the Windows Insider program. On February 12, 2015, Microsoft started to test out previews of Windows 10 Mobile. Microsoft announced that the Windows Insider program would continue beyond the official release of Windows 10 for future updates.

Gabriel Aul and Dona Sarkar were both previously the head of the Windows Insider Program. The present head of the Windows Insider program is Amanda Langowski. Similar to the Windows Insider program, the Microsoft Office, Microsoft Edge, Skype, Bing, Xbox and Visual Studio Code teams have set up their own Insider programs.

== History ==
Microsoft originally launched Windows Insider for enterprise testers and the "technically able" to test out new developer features and to gather feedback to improve the features built into Windows 10. By the time of the official launch of Windows 10 for PCs, a total of 5 million volunteers were registered on both Windows 10 and Windows 10 Mobile. They were also among the first people to receive the official update to Windows 10.

With the release of Windows 10, the Windows Insider app was merged with the Settings app. This made the ability to install Windows Insider preview builds an optional feature which could be accessed directly from within Windows 10.

In May 2017, Microsoft announced that the program would extend to Windows Server 2016. The first Insider build for this operating system was released on 13 July 2017.

On June 24, 2021, Microsoft announced that the program would extend to Windows 11, with the Dev and Beta channels transitioning to the new operating system. The first Insider build for Windows 11 was released on June 28, 2021 for the Dev Channel.

== Channels ==
Windows Insider Preview updates are delivered to testers in different channels (previously "rings") or logical categories: Windows Insiders in Dev Channel (previously Fast ring) receive updates prior to Windows Insiders in Beta Channel (previously Slow ring) but might experience more bugs and other issues. Release Preview Channel (previously Release Preview ring) was introduced in February 2016.

On November 5, 2019, Microsoft abandoned the Skip Ahead ring from the Windows Insider Program, stating "Our goal is to provide everyone in the Fast ring the freshest builds at the same time".

On June 15, 2020, Microsoft introduced "channels" model to its Windows Insider Program, succeeding its "rings" model.

On March 6, 2023, Microsoft announced that the Canary Channel is now available to the public, allowing users to try out "hot off the presses" builds that include experimental and cutting-edge features.

On April 24, 2026, Microsoft overhauled the Windows Insider channels into a simplified options with Experimental and Beta channels.

Channel	Available	Description
Selfhost	Internal	In this channel, builds that Insiders in Canary Channel will receive would be validated. These builds are less stable than Canary Channel.
Canary	External	In this channel, builds that have only passed basic automated tests would be tested and validated. These builds are in early development cycles with the newest code and released more often than the Dev Channel and will be relatively unstable and buggy.
Dev	External	In this channel, Insiders will have access to builds that are being tested and validated in Canary and Selfhost Channels. These builds are more stable than Canary and Selfhost Channels, but still with rough edges and some instability.
Microsoft	Internal	In this channel, Insider-validated builds are rolled out company-wide for validation and bug fixes before it makes into Beta Channel. These builds are more stable than Canary, Dev and Selfhost Channels.
Beta	External	In this channel, Insiders will have access to builds that are tied to a specific upcoming release, and will be reliable with updates validated by Microsoft.
Release Preview	External	In this channel, Insiders will have access to the upcoming release of Windows prior to it being released to the world, with advanced quality updates and certain key features.

== Supported devices ==
=== Supported processors ===
On July 17, 2017, reports began to come that Windows 10 Creators Update refused to install on PCs and tablets with Intel Atom "Clover Trail" processors. At first, it appeared as though this might have been a temporary block as Microsoft and hardware partners work to fix the issues preventing the operating system from running well. However, Microsoft later confirmed that devices running the "Clover Trail" Intel Atom processors would not be receiving the Creators Update, as the processors are no longer supported by Intel and does not have the appropriate firmware to properly run versions of Windows 10 newer than the Anniversary Update.

The following processors are no longer supported and will remain on Windows 10 Anniversary Update:

- Atom Z2760
- Atom Z2520
- Atom Z2560
- Atom Z2580

Because PCs with unsupported processors could not receive new feature updates, Microsoft agreed to extend support for these PCs with the bug fixes and security updates for the latest compatible version of Windows 10.

Versions of Windows 10 that were released before a microprocessor was released are also not supported and installations for those operating systems may be actively blocked. For example, Windows 10 Version 1507 LTSB will not install on Kaby Lake processors.

Due to security concerns regarding zero-day exploits, Windows 11 now requires an 8th generation or later Intel CPU or a 2nd generation AMD Ryzen or later CPU, with a Trusted Platform Module 2.0 security chip and Secure Boot enabled. Testing had been conducted on 7th generation Intel and 1st generation Ryzen CPUs, but support was ended before the final version was released. Older CPUs and systems without TPM or Secure Boot may be able to run Windows 11, but will require changes to be made to the system registry to be able to upgrade to the operating system. Microsoft has raised the possibility of not providing updates to unsupported devices on Windows 11.

=== Supported smartphones ===
Microsoft initially launched Windows 10 Technical Preview for certain third-generation (x30 series) phones from their Lumia family and subsequently released it to second-generation (x20 series) devices throughout the testing phase. Some hacked their non-Lumia phones (which were not supported at the time) to download the preview builds. Microsoft responded by blocking all unsupported models. To roll back the installed technical preview back to Windows Phone 8.1, Microsoft launched Windows Device Recovery Tool that removes Windows 10 and recovers the latest officially released software and firmware.

Preview build 10080, released on May 14, 2015, was the first to support a non-Lumia device, the HTC One M8 for Windows. This was followed up by Xiaomi who, in partnership with Microsoft, released a ROM port of Windows 10 to its flagship Mi 4 handset on June 1, 2015. At that time, it was limited to certain registered users in China. Build 10080 and its follow-up build 10166 also added support for fourth-generation Lumia (x40 series) devices. As a result, all compatible Windows Phone 8 or later Lumia phones now support the preview.

In August 2015, Microsoft stated that while all Windows Phone devices, including those from Microsoft's new hardware partners announced the previous year, would receive the final version of Windows 10 Mobile, not all would receive preview builds through the Insider program. However, the company did not provide any information at the time on whether new devices would be added to the preview program. Microsoft instead focused on promoting new devices that come with Windows 10 Mobile, including their Lumia 950 and Lumia 950 XL flagships, and the low-cost Lumia 550 and Lumia 650. Since their release, these new Windows 10 devices became eligible to receive future updates in advance via the Insider program, beginning with build 10586 on December 4, 2015.

On February 19, 2016, Microsoft released the first Windows 10 Mobile "Redstone" preview, build 14267. Starting with this build, future preview versions became exclusively available for devices that were already running a non-Insider preview of the OS, except for the Mi4 ROM version. This was followed by build 14291, released for existing Windows 10 devices on March 17, 2016 in conjunction with the official RTM release of Windows 10 Mobile to third and fourth-generation Lumias. The following week, it became available to the newly upgraded older Lumias in addition to several other devices already on Windows 10 Mobile at the time.

All supported devices subsequently received Insider preview builds as far as build 15063, the "Creators Update", released on March 20, 2017. This included the official release of build 14393, the "Anniversary Update", on August 2, 2016. However, it was announced in April 2017 that many devices, including all third-generation Lumias, would not receive the RTM version of the Creators Update and further "Redstone" development builds, following feedback from users. Of the devices that remain supported, nearly all, except the Lumia 640 and its XL variant, had originally come with Windows 10 Mobile instead of Windows Phone 8.1.

Supported smartphones
Manufacturer	Device	Threshold (RTM)	Redstone 1 (Anniversary Update)	Redstone 2 (Creators Update)	
Manufacturer	Device	Threshold (RTM)	Redstone 1 (Anniversary Update)	First release	Second release
Windows 10 Mobile devices
Acer	Liquid Jade Primo	No	14393	Yes	No
Alcatel	Fierce XL	No	Yes	Yes	Preview only
Alcatel	Idol 4s	No	Yes	Yes	Preview only
HP	Elite x3	No	14291	Yes	Preview only
MCJ	Madosma Q501	No	14291	Yes	No
MCJ	Madosma Q601	No	No	15063	Preview only
Microsoft Mobile	Lumia 550	10586	14291	Yes	Planned, but canceled
Microsoft Mobile	Lumia 650	10586	Yes	Yes	Preview only
Microsoft Mobile	Lumia 950	10586	Yes	Yes	Preview only
Microsoft Mobile	Lumia 950 XL	10586	Yes	Yes	Preview only
SoftBank	503LV	No	No	15063	Preview only
Trinity	NuAns Neo	No	No	15063	Preview only
Vaio	VPB051	No	No	15063	No
Vaio	Phone Biz	No	No	15063	Preview only
Windows Phone 8.1 devices
BLU	Win HD W510U	No	14291	Yes	No
BLU	Win HD LTE X150Q	No	14267	Yes	No
HTC	One M8	10080	No	No	No
LG	Lancet	10586	No	No	No
Nokia/Microsoft Mobile	Lumia 430-series Includes 430 and 435	10051	14291	Yes	No
Nokia/Microsoft Mobile	Lumia 520-series Includes 520, 521, 525 and 526	10051	No	No	No
Nokia/Microsoft Mobile	Lumia 530	10051	No	No	No
Nokia/Microsoft Mobile	Lumia 532	10051	14291	Yes	No
Nokia/Microsoft Mobile	Lumia 535	10051	14291	Yes	No
Nokia/Microsoft Mobile	Lumia 540	10080	14291	Yes	No
Nokia/Microsoft Mobile	Lumia 620	10051	No	No	No
Nokia/Microsoft Mobile	Lumia 625	10051	No	No	No
Nokia/Microsoft Mobile	Lumia 630-series Includes 630, 635, 636 and 638	Yes	14291; Except 512 MB	Yes; Except 512 MB	No
Nokia/Microsoft Mobile	Lumia 640	10586	14291	Yes	Preview only
Nokia/Microsoft Mobile	Lumia 640 XL	10080	14291	Yes	Preview only
Nokia/Microsoft Mobile	Lumia 720	10051	No	No	No
Nokia/Microsoft Mobile	Lumia 730	9941	14291	Yes	No
Nokia/Microsoft Mobile	Lumia 735	10051	14291	Yes	No
Nokia/Microsoft Mobile	Lumia 810	10051	No	No	No
Nokia/Microsoft Mobile	Lumia 820	10051	No	No	No
Nokia/Microsoft Mobile	Lumia 822	10051	No	No	No
Nokia/Microsoft Mobile	Lumia 830	Yes	14291	Yes	No
Nokia/Microsoft Mobile	Lumia 920	10051	No	No	No
Nokia/Microsoft Mobile	Lumia 925	10051	No	No	No
Nokia/Microsoft Mobile	Lumia 928	10051	No	No	No
Nokia/Microsoft Mobile	Lumia Icon	10051	14332	Yes	No
Nokia/Microsoft Mobile	Lumia 930	10080	14291	Yes	No
Nokia/Microsoft Mobile	Lumia 1020	10051	No	No	No
Nokia/Microsoft Mobile	Lumia 1320	10051	No	No	No
Nokia/Microsoft Mobile	Lumia 1520	10051	14291	Yes	No
ROMs for MIUI devices
Xiaomi	Mi4	10080	Yes	Yes	No

== See also ==
- Microsoft Developer Network
- Microsoft Garage
