= Windows 10 Mobile =

Mobile operating system developed by Microsoft

- Screenshot of Windows 10 Mobile home screen
- Developer: Microsoft Mobile
- OS family: Windows Phone
- Working state: Discontinued
- Released to manufacturing: November 20, 2015; 10 years ago
- General availability: March 17, 2016; 10 years ago
- Final release: 10.0.15254.603 (KB4535289) / January 14, 2020; 6 years ago
- Update method: Windows Update
- Package manager: XAP, APPX, APPXBundle
- Supported platforms: ARM 32-bit, ARM 64-bit (Note: Never officially released and is internal only)
- Kernel type: Hybrid (Windows NT)
- Preceded by: Windows Phone 8.1 (2014); Windows RT (2012)
- Succeeded by: Microsoft Launcher via Android 10 in Surface Duo (2020), Windows 11 on Tablets, Handhelds & Small Screen Devices

Support status
- Unsupported as of January 14, 2020 Version 1511 November Update: Unsupported as of January 9, 2018 Version 1607 Anniversary Update: Unsupported as of October 9, 2018 Version 1703 Creators Update: Unsupported as of June 11, 2019 Version 1709 Fall Creators Update: Unsupported as of December 10, 2019 Extended support ended on January 14, 2020

Windows 10 Mobile is a discontinued mobile operating system and is the fourth and final generation of Microsoft's Windows Phone, succeeding Windows Phone 8.1. First released in 2015, it was marketed by Microsoft as being an edition of its PC counterpart, Windows 10.

Windows 10 Mobile aimed to provide greater consistency with its counterpart for PCs, including more extensive synchronization of content, Universal Windows Platform apps, as well as the capability, on supported hardware, to connect devices to an external display and use a desktop interface with mouse and keyboard input support (reminiscent of Windows on PCs). Microsoft built tools for developers to port iOS Objective-C apps with minimal modifications. Windows Phone 8.1 smartphones are eligible for upgrade to Windows 10 Mobile, pursuant to manufacturer and carrier support. Some features vary depending on hardware compatibility.

Windows 10 Mobile was designed for use on smartphones and phablets running on 32-bit ARM processor architectures. Microsoft also intended for the platform to be used on ARM tablets with screens 9 inches or smaller in size, but such devices were rarely commercially released. Windows 10 Mobile entered public beta for selected Lumia smartphones on February 12, 2015. The first Lumia smartphones powered by Windows 10 Mobile were released on November 20, 2015, while eligible Windows Phone devices began receiving updates to Windows 10 Mobile on March 17, 2016, pursuant to manufacturer and carrier support.

The platform never achieved any significant degree of popularity or market share in comparison to Android or iOS. By 2017, Microsoft had already begun to downplay Windows 10 Mobile, having discontinued active development (beyond maintenance releases) due to a lack of user and developer interest in the platform, and focused on serving incumbent mobile operating systems as part of its software and services strategy. Support for Windows 10 Mobile ended on January 14, 2020. As of November 2021, Windows 10 Mobile had approximately a 0.01% share of the mobile operating system market.

== Development ==
Microsoft had already begun the process of unifying the Windows platform across device classes in 2012; Windows Phone 8 dropped the Windows CE-based architecture of its predecessor, Windows Phone 7, for a platform built upon the NT kernel that shared much of the same architecture with its PC counterpart Windows 8 including file system (NTFS), networking stack, security elements, graphics engine (DirectX), device driver framework and hardware abstraction layer. At Build 2014, Microsoft also unveiled the concept of Universal Windows Apps. With the addition of Windows Runtime support to these platforms, apps created for Windows 8.1 could now be ported to Windows Phone 8.1 and Xbox One while sharing a common codebase with their PC counterparts. User data and licenses for an app could also be shared between multiple platforms.

In July 2014, Microsoft's then-new CEO Satya Nadella explained that the company was planning to "streamline the next version of Windows from three operating systems into one single converged operating system for screens of all sizes", unifying Windows, Windows Phone, and Windows Embedded around a common architecture and a unified application ecosystem. However, Nadella stated that these internal changes would not have any effect on how the operating systems are marketed and sold.

On September 30, 2014, Microsoft unveiled Windows 10; Terry Myerson explained that Windows 10 would be Microsoft's "most comprehensive platform ever", promoting plans to provide a "unified" platform for desktop computers, laptops, tablets, smartphones, and all-in-one devices. Windows 10 on phones was publicly unveiled during the Windows 10: The Next Chapter press event on January 21, 2015; unlike previous Windows Phone versions, it would also expand the platform's focus to small, ARM-based tablets. Microsoft's previous attempt at an operating system for ARM-based tablets, Windows RT (which was based upon the PC version of Windows 8), was commercially unsuccessful.

During the 2015 Build keynote, Microsoft announced the middleware toolkit "Islandwood", later known as Windows Bridge for iOS, which provides a toolchain that can assist developers in porting Objective-C software (primarily iOS projects) to build as Universal Windows Apps. An early build of Windows Bridge for iOS was released as open-source software under the MIT License on August 6, 2015. Visual Studio 2015 can also convert Xcode projects into Visual Studio projects. Microsoft also announced plans for a toolkit codenamed "Centennial", which would allow desktop Windows software using Win32 APIs to be ported to Windows 10 Mobile.

=== Project Astoria ===
At Build, Microsoft had also announced an Android runtime environment for Windows 10 Mobile known as "Astoria", which would allow Android apps to run in an emulated environment with minimal changes, and have access to Microsoft platform APIs such as Bing Maps and Xbox Live as nearly drop-in replacements for equivalent Google Mobile Services. Google Mobile Services and certain core APIs would not be available, and apps with "deep integration into background tasks" were said to poorly support the environment.

On February 25, 2016, after already having delayed it in November 2015, Microsoft announced that "Astoria" would be shelved, arguing that it was redundant to the native Windows Bridge toolkit since iOS is already a primary target for mobile app development. The company also encouraged use of products from Xamarin (which they had acquired the previous day) for multi-platform app development using C# programming language instead. Portions of Astoria were used as a basis for the Windows Subsystem for Linux (WSL) platform on the PC version of Windows 10.

=== Naming ===
To promote it as being unified with its desktop equivalent, Microsoft promoted the operating system as being an edition of Windows 10. Microsoft had begun to phase out specific references to the Windows Phone brand in its advertising in mid-2014, but critics have still considered the operating system to be an iteration and continuation of Windows Phone due to its lineage and similar overall functionality. Microsoft referred to the OS as "Windows 10 for phones and small tablets" during its unveiling, and leaked screenshots from a Technical Preview build identified the operating system as "Windows 10 Mobile". The technical preview was officially called the "Windows 10 Technical Preview for phones", while the user agent of Microsoft Edge [Legacy] contained a reference to "Windows Phone 10".

On May 13, 2015, Microsoft officially confirmed the platform would be known as Windows 10 Mobile.

== Features ==
A major aspect of Windows 10 Mobile is a focus on harmonizing user experiences and functionality between different classes of devices—specifically, devices running the PC-oriented version of Windows 10. Under the Universal Windows Platform concept, Windows Runtime apps for Windows 10 on PC can be ported to other platforms in the Windows 10 family with nearly the same codebase, but with adaptations for specific device classes. Windows 10 Mobile also shares user interface elements with its PC counterpart, such as the updated Action Center and settings menu. During its initial unveiling, Microsoft presented several examples of Windows apps that would have similar functionality and user interfaces between Windows 10 on desktops and mobile devices, including updated Photos and Maps apps, and new Microsoft Office apps. Although marketed as a converged platform, and as with Windows Phone 8, using a Windows NT-based kernel, Windows 10 Mobile still cannot run Win32 desktop applications, but is compatible with software designed for Windows Phone 8. Similar to Windows Phone 8, Windows Phone 10 has used UEFI with ACPI protocol as its bootloader.

Notifications can be synced between devices; dismissing a notification on, for example, a laptop, will also dismiss it from a phone. Certain types of notifications now allow inline replies. The start screen now has the option to display wallpapers as a background of the screen behind translucent tiles, rather than within the tiles. The messaging app adds support for internet-based Skype messaging alongside SMS, similarly to Apple's iMessage, and can synchronize these conversations with other devices. The camera app has been updated to match the "Lumia Camera" app previously exclusive to Lumia products, and a new Photos app aggregates content from local storage and OneDrive, and can perform automatic enhancements to photos. The on-screen keyboard now contains a virtual pointing stick for manipulating the text editing cursor, a dedicated voice input button, and can be shifted towards the left or right of the screen to improve one-handed usability on larger devices.

Windows 10 Mobile supports "Continuum", a feature that allows supported devices to connect to an external display, and scale its user interface and apps into a "PC-like" desktop interface with support for mouse and keyboard input over USB or Bluetooth. Devices can connect directly to external displays wirelessly using Miracast, via USB-C, or via docking station accessories with USB ports, as well as HDMI and DisplayPort outputs.

A new iteration of the Office Mobile suite, Office for Windows 10, is also bundled. Based upon the Android and iOS versions of Office Mobile, they introduce a new user interface with a variation of the ribbon toolbar used by the desktop version, and a new mobile version of Outlook. Outlook utilizes the same rendering engine as the Windows desktop version of Microsoft Word. Microsoft Edge [Legacy] replaces Internet Explorer Mobile as the default web browser.

== Release ==
Windows 10 Mobile's first-party launch devices—the Lumia 950, Lumia 950 XL, and Lumia 550—were released in November 2015 being the first phones to ship with Windows 10 Mobile. Monthly updates to the OS software are being released to address bugs and security issues. These updates are distributed to all Windows 10 Mobile devices and do not require the intervention of a user's wireless carrier in order to authorize their distribution. Firmware upgrades will still require authorization by the user's carrier.

The Windows Insider program, adopted to provide a public beta for the PC version of Windows 10, is used to provide a public beta version of Windows 10 Mobile for selected devices. A build released on April 10, 2015, was to support most second and third generation Lumia products, but the Lumia 930, Lumia Icon, and Lumia 640 XL did not receive the update due to scaling bugs, and delivery was suspended as a whole due to backup and restore issues on some models. An update to the Windows Phone Recovery Tool resolved these concerns, and delivery of Windows 10 updates was restored to the 520 with build 10052, and to the 640 with build 10080.

Build number 10136 was released on June 16, 2015, with a "migration bug" that required that existing devices on build 10080 be reverted to Windows Phone 8.1 using the Recovery Tool before the installation of 10136 could proceed. This migration bug was fixed a week later with the release of build 10149. Mobile builds of the Redstone branch till 14322 were halted for the device Lumia 635 (1 GB RAM) due to bugs.

=== Upgrade release ===
Some Windows Phone 8.1 smartphones can be upgraded to Windows 10 Mobile, pursuant to hardware compatibility, manufacturer support, and carrier support. Not all phones can receive the update nor support all of its features. Microsoft originally stated that stable upgrades for Windows Phone 8.1 devices would be released in December 2015; however, the release was ultimately delayed to March 17, 2016. Among first-party devices, only the Lumia 430, 435, 532, 535, 540, 635 (1 GB RAM), 640, 640 XL, 735, 830, 929, 930 and 1520 are supported. The only third-party devices supported are the BLU Products Win HD w510u and Win HD LTE x150q, and the MCJ Madosma Q501. Windows 10 Mobile does not officially support any HTC devices (HTC One M8 for Windows, HTC Windows Phone 8X, HTC Windows Phone 8S), although the HTC One M8 for Windows could be upgraded to the public release version of Windows 10 Mobile through the Windows Insider program. While Microsoft stated that the Nokia Lumia Icon may be upgraded at a later date, the company stated that there will not be a second wave of officially supported devices. Microsoft also removed statements which promoted the BLU Win JR LTE as being compatible with Windows 10.

Microsoft originally stated that all Lumia smartphones running Windows Phone 8 and 8.1 would receive updates to 10, but Microsoft later reiterated that only devices with the "Lumia Denim" firmware revision and at least 8 GB of internal storage would receive the upgrade. In February 2015, Joe Belfiore stated that Microsoft was working on support for devices with 512 MB of RAM, (such as the popular Nokia Lumia 520), but these plans have since been dropped. Upon the official upgrade release, some Lumia models, particularly the Lumia 1020 and 1320, were excluded despite meeting the previously announced criteria. Microsoft cited poor user feedback on the performance of preview builds on these models as reasoning. On October 17, 2017, Nearly 2 years after the Windows 10 release, Microsoft released an Over-The-Cable (OTC) Updater tool to bring all Lumias up to date to the latest supported Windows 10 build, even older 512 MB and 1 GB RAM unlocked devices such as the 520, 620, 720, 925, 920 etc. which were updated using the tool to Build 10586 (November Update).

== Devices ==
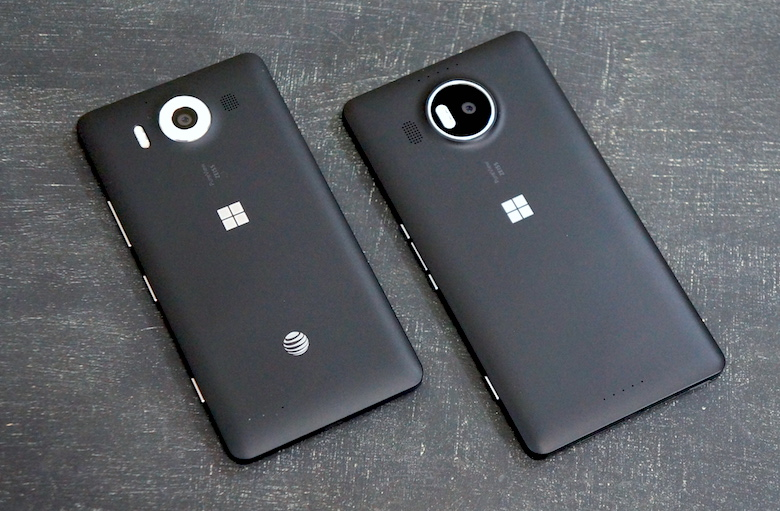
Lumia 950 and Lumia 950 XL, Microsoft's last flagship devices running Windows 10 Mobile

As with Windows Phone, Windows 10 Mobile supports ARM system-on-chips from Qualcomm's Snapdragon line. In March 2015, Ars Technica reported that the operating system will also introduce support for IA-32 system-on-chips from Intel and AMD, including Intel's Atom x3 and Cherry Trail Atom x5 and x7, and AMD's Carrizo. These plans never materialized.

Minimum specifications for Windows 10 Mobile devices are similar to those of Windows Phone 8, with a minimum screen resolution of 800×480 (854×480 if software buttons are in use), 1 GB of RAM and 8 GB of internal storage. Owing to hardware advancements and the operating system's support for tablets, screen resolutions can now reach as high as QSXGA resolution (2560×2048) and further, as opposed to the 1080p cap of Windows Phone 8. The screen's resolution dictates the minimum amount of RAM required; screens with a resolution 800×480 or 960×540 and higher require 1 GB, 1920×1080 (FHD) or 1440×900< and higher require 2 GB, and 2560×1440 and higher require 3 GB.

Microsoft unveiled flagship Lumia smartphones bundled with Windows 10 during a media event on October 6, 2015, including Lumia 950, Lumia 950 XL, and the low-end Lumia 550.

== Version history ==
=== First release (version 1511) ===
Microsoft announced Windows 10 Mobile during their January 21, 2015 event "The Next Chapter". The first Windows 10 Mobile build was rolled out on February 12, 2015, as part of the Windows Insider Program to a subset of mobile devices running Windows Phone 8 and 8.1. As with the desktop editions of Windows 10, this initial release was codenamed "Threshold", it was part of both the "Threshold 1" and "Threshold 2" development cycles. Windows 10 Mobile launched with the Microsoft Lumia 550, 950 and 950 XL. The rollout for Windows Phone 8.1 devices started March 17, 2016.

=== Anniversary Update (version 1607) ===
On February 19, 2016, Microsoft restarted the rollout of full builds for the first feature update, officially known as the "Anniversary Update" or "Version 1607", codenamed "Redstone 1". Like the start of the previous wave, the first builds were not available to all devices that were included in the Windows Insider Program.

=== Creators Update (version 1703) and Fall Creators Update (version 1709) ===
The Creators Update (named after the equivalent update to Windows 10 for PC), also known as Redstone 2, was first previewed on the Insider branch on August 17, 2016. and began deployment on April 25, 2017. It features mainly minor feature additions, including an e-book reader within Edge, the ability to turn off the phone screen when using Continuum mode on an external display, SMS support in Skype, SD card encryption, and other changes. Despite the platform's synergy with Windows 10 for PCs, some of its features (such as Night Light and Paint 3D) were excluded. Around the time that the Creators Update was finalized, Windows Insider users began to be issued updates on a branch known as feature2. Microsoft stated that there were no plans to move Windows 10 Mobile to be in sync with the other Windows 10-platforms just yet; media outlets considered this decision to be a sign that Microsoft was beginning to wind down active development of Windows 10 Mobile beyond maintenance releases, as development was no longer directly in sync with the PC version.

The Creators Update was only offered to eleven existing Windows 10 Mobile devices, of which nine would later receive the Fall Creators Update:

- Alcatel Idol 4S and 4S Pro
- Alcatel OneTouch Fierce XL
- HP Elite x3
- Lenovo Softbank 503LV
- MCJ Madosma Q601 †
- Microsoft Lumia 550
- Microsoft Lumia 640 and 640 XL †
- Microsoft Lumia 650
- Microsoft Lumia 950 and 950 XL
- Trinity NuAns Neo
- VAIO Phone Biz (VPB051)

† indicates a phone that is incompatible with the Fall Creators Update.

In early June 2017, a private build, briefly deployed by accident by Microsoft, revealed work on an updated interface for Windows 10 Mobile known as "CShell" ("composable shell"), an implementation of the Windows shell across device classes using a modular system. The build featured a Start screen, Action Center, and Continuum desktop interface that were nearly identical in functionality and appearance to their equivalents on Windows 10 for PC. However, this iteration of the operating system was no longer backwards compatible with Windows Phone Silverlight apps.

== Reception ==
Year	Marketshare
2016	0.34%
2017	0.1%
2018	0.33%
2019	0.02%

Reception of Windows 10 Mobile was mixed. In its review of the Lumia 950 XL, The Verge felt that the platform was "buggy and unfinished", and that its user interface was inconsistent in operation and felt more like Android mixed with few of the distinct design elements that were hallmarks of Windows Phone. It was noted that the OS still retained much of the performance of Windows Phone 8, and that Microsoft had made efforts to create synergies with the PC version of Windows 10 via its universal apps concept. Continuum was regarded as potentially being a signature feature over time, but that it was merely a "parlor trick" in its launch state due to a lack of support for desktop-oriented interfaces among third-party software. TechRadar felt that the lack of apps was the "biggest let-down on Windows Phone and Windows 10 Mobile alike." After many user complaints, Microsoft started allowing users to downgrade from Windows 10 Mobile to Windows Phone 8.1.

== Financial results ==
According to Microsoft's 2016 fiscal year, the revenue from the company's smartphone division was $3,358 million, a 44% loss when compared to $7,702 million in 2015.

Phone product and service offerings
	2016	2015	2014
Revenue from external customers (in millions)	3,358	7,702	3,073

The year before, Microsoft disclosed information on sales of its Microsoft Mobile subsidiary:

Phone hardware
	2015	2014
Revenue (in millions)	7,524	1,982
Operating income (in millions)	701	54

In addition, as disclosed in the company's prior fiscal year, Microsoft spent "$2.5 billion of integration and restructuring expenses, primarily costs associated with restructuring plans," which includes the cost of mass layoffs.

== Discontinuation ==
WhatsApp no longer has compatibility with Windows Mobile.

On October 8, 2017, Microsoft executive Joe Belfiore revealed that the company would no longer actively develop new features or hardware for Windows phones, citing its low market share, and the resultant lack of third-party software for the platform. Microsoft had largely abandoned its mobile business, having laid off the majority of Microsoft Mobile employees in 2016, sold a number of intellectual property and manufacturing assets (including, in particular, the Nokia feature phone business) to HMD Global and Foxconn (which began producing Android-based smartphones under the Nokia brand) focused software efforts on providing apps and services compatible with the incumbent Android and iOS instead, and having since released dual-touchscreen Android smartphones under the Surface Duo brand. Development of Windows 10 Mobile would be limited to maintenance releases and patches. By December 2018, Statcounter had reported Windows 10 Mobile's market share to be 0.33%.

In January 2019, Microsoft announced that Windows 10 Mobile would reach end of life on December 10, 2019, after which no further security updates will be released, and online services tied to the OS (such as device backup) have begun to be phased out. However, Microsoft quietly moved the EOL date to January 14, 2020 (aligned with the EOL date for Windows 7, Windows Server 2008/R2 and Internet Explorer 10) with one additional security update released.
