= List of Windows Phone 8 devices =

List of smartphones running Microsoft's Windows Phone 8

Microsoft Windows 8 operating system logo

This is a list of hardware devices that are shipped with Microsoft's Windows Phone 8 operating system. HTC Corporation, Samsung, Nokia and Huawei have all launched Windows Phone 8 based devices. The list, sorted by processor and screen resolution, contains devices that have been confirmed and officially announced by their manufacturers.

== Devices ==
=== Dual-core 480p ===
These devices feature a 480p (WVGA) screen with a 480x800 resolution and a microSD card reader.

Product	Release date	CPU (GHz)	RAM (GB)	Storage (GB)	Display		Camera (MP)		NFC
Product	Release date	CPU (GHz)	RAM (GB)	Storage (GB)	Size (in.)	Type	Rear	Front	NFC
HTC 8S	December 2012	MSM8227 (1.0)	0.5	4	4.0	S-LCD	5	—N/a	No
HTC 8XT	August 2013	MSM8930AA (1.4)	1	8	4.3	S-LCD 2	8	1.6	Yes
Huawei Ascend W1	January 2013	MSM8230 (1.2)	0.5	4	4.0	IPS LCD	5	0.3	No
Huawei Ascend W2	August 2013	MSM8230AA (1.4)	0.5	8	4.3	IPS LCD	8	—N/a	No
Huawei 4Afrika	January 2013	MSM8230 (1.2)	0.5	4	4.0	IPS LCD	5	—N/a	No
Brainc Gana	March 2013	MSM8230 (1.2)	0.5	4	4.0	IPS LCD	2	—N/a	No
Nokia Lumia 520 series (includes 520 and 521)	March 2013	MSM8227 (1.0)	0.5	8	4.0	IPS LCD	5	—N/a	No
Nokia Lumia 525 series (includes 525 and 526)	December 2013	MSM8227 (1.0)	1	8	4.0	IPS LCD	5	—N/a	No
Nokia Lumia 620	January 2013	MSM8227 (1.0)	0.5	8	3.8	ClearBlack IPS LCD	5	0.3	Yes
Nokia Lumia 625	Jul 2013	MSM8230/8930 (1.2)	0.5	8	4.7	IPS LCD	5	0.3	No
Nokia Lumia 720	March 2013	MSM8227 (1.0)	0.5	8	4.3	ClearBlack IPS LCD	6.7	1.3	Yes
Nokia Lumia 810	November 2012	MSM8960 (1.5)	1	8	4.3	ClearBlack AMOLED	8	1.2	Yes
Nokia Lumia 820	November 2012	MSM8960 (1.5)	1	8	4.3	ClearBlack AMOLED	8	0.3	Yes
Nokia Lumia 822	November 2012	MSM8960 (1.5)	1	16	4.3	ClearBlack AMOLED	8	0.3	Yes
Samsung ATIV Odyssey	January 2013	MSM8960 (1.5)	1	8	4.0	Super AMOLED	5	1.2	Yes

=== Dual-core 720p and WXGA ===
Non-Nokia devices and the Nokia Lumia 1320 feature a 720p screen and, except for the Samsung devices, lack a microSD card reader. All other Nokia devices feature a WXGA screen at 768x1280.

Product	Release Date	CPU (GHz)	RAM (GB)	Storage (GB)	Display		Camera (MP)		NFC
Product	Release Date	CPU (GHz)	RAM (GB)	Storage (GB)	Size (in.)	Type	Rear	Front	NFC
HTC 8X	November 2012	MSM8960 (1.5)	1	8; 16	4.3	S-LCD 2	8	2.1	Yes
Nokia Lumia 920	November 2012	MSM8960 (1.5)	1	32	4.5	ClearBlack IPS LCD	8.7	1.3	Yes
Nokia Lumia 925	June 2013	MSM8960 (1.5)	1	16; 32	4.5	ClearBlack AMOLED	8.7	1.3	Yes
Nokia Lumia 928	May 2013	MSM8960 (1.5)	1	32	4.5	ClearBlack AMOLED	8	1.3	Yes
Nokia Lumia 1020	July 2013	MSM8960 (1.5)	2	32; 64	4.5	ClearBlack AMOLED	41	1.2	Yes
Nokia Lumia 1320	December 2013	MSM8930AB (1.7)	1	8	6.0	ClearBlack IPS LCD	5	0.3	No
Samsung ATIV S	December 2012	MSM8960 (1.5)	1	16; 32	4.8	Super AMOLED	8	1.9	Yes
Samsung ATIV S Neo	August 2013	MSM8930AA (1.4)	1	16	4.8	TN LCD	8	1.2	Yes

=== Quad-core 1080p ===
Among these devices, only the Nokia Lumia Icon lacks a microSD card reader.

Product	Release Date	CPU (GHz)	RAM (GB)	Storage (GB)	Display		Camera (MP)		NFC
Product	Release Date	CPU (GHz)	RAM (GB)	Storage (GB)	Size (in.)	Type	Rear	Front	NFC
Nokia Lumia Icon	February 2014	Snapdragon 800 (2.2)	2	32	5.0	ClearBlack AMOLED	20	1.2	Yes
Nokia Lumia 1520	November 2013	Snapdragon 800 (2.2)	2	16; 32	6.0	ClearBlack IPS LCD	20	1.2	Yes
Samsung ATIV SE	April 2014	Snapdragon 800 (2.3)	2	16	5.0	Super AMOLED	13	2	Yes

== See also ==
- Windows Phone version history
- Windows Phone 8
- List of Windows Phone 8.1 devices
