= Lists of mobile computers =

The Samsung Galaxy Z Fold 3 and the Samsung Galaxy Z Flip 3.

Lists of computing device designed to be portable.

== Lists by product type ==
- Lists of mobile phones
- Comparison of tablet computers
- List of best-selling mobile phones
- Comparison of e-readers
- List of handheld game consoles

== Lists that include currently available products ==
- List of open-source mobile phones
- Comparison of open-source mobile phones
- List of iPhone models
- List of iPad models
- Comparison of Google Pixel smartphones
- Microsoft Surface tablets
- Mobile computers running Android:
  - List of BlackBerry products
  - List of Google products
    - Comparison of Android Go products
  - List of Huawei phones
  - Comparison of HTC devices
  - List of LG mobile phones
  - Motorola Moto
  - List of Nokia products
  - Samsung Galaxy phones and tablets
  - List of Sony Ericsson products

== Lists without any current products ==
- Comparison of Firefox OS devices
- Comparison of Google Nexus smartphones
- List of Google Play edition devices
- List of Palm OS devices
- List of Pocket PC devices
- List of Windows 10 Mobile devices
- List of Windows Phone 8.1 devices
- List of Windows Phone 8 devices
- List of Windows Phone 7 devices
- List of Windows Mobile devices
