= Samsung Ativ S =

Smartphone

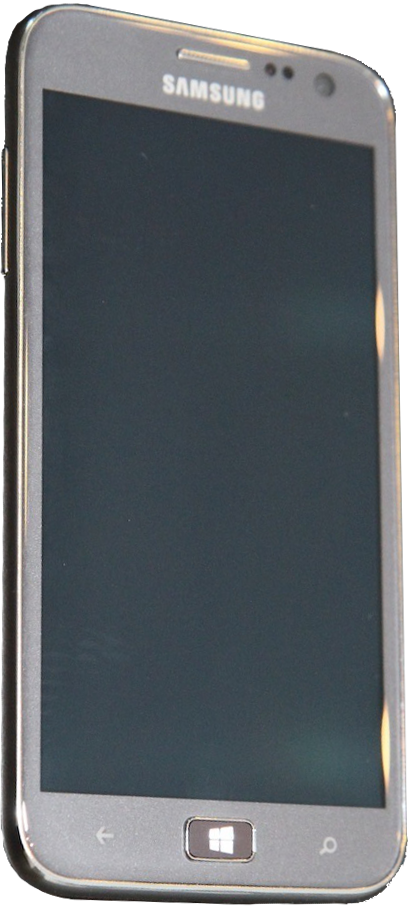
- Manufacturer: Samsung Electronics
- Type: Smartphone
- Series: Samsung ATIV
- Predecessor: Samsung Focus S
- Successor: Samsung ATIV SE
- Related: Samsung Galaxy S III; Samsung Omnia W
- Compatible networks: 1700 MHz LTE (SGH-T899M); 2G GSM/GPRS/EDGE – 850, 900, 1,800, 1,900 MHz; HSPA – 700, 800, 1,700, 1,900, 2,100 MHz
- Form factor: Slate
- Dimensions: 137.2 mm × 70.5 mm × 8.7 mm (5.40 in × 2.78 in × 0.34 in)
- Weight: 135 g (4.8 oz)
- Operating system: Windows Phone 8, upgradeable to Windows Phone 8.1 Update 1
- CPU: 1.5 GHz dual-core Krait
- GPU: Adreno 225
- Memory: 1 GB RAM
- Storage: 16 or 32 GB flash memory
- Removable storage: microSD (supports SDXC)
- Battery: 2,300 mAh, 7.98 Wh, 3.8 V Internal rechargeable li-ion User replaceable
- Rear camera: List: 8.0 megapixels back-side illuminated sensor; LED flash; HD video (1080p) at 30 frames/s; Aperture f/2.6; Autofocus; Zero shutter lag
- Front camera: 1.2 or 1.9 megapixels
- Display: List: 4.8 in (120 mm) diagonal with 16:9 aspect ratio widescreen; HD Super AMOLED touchscreen; 1280×720 pixels (306 ppi) and RGBG-Matrix (PenTile); Contrast ratio: infinite (nominal) / 3.419:1 (sunlight); 16M colours
- Connectivity: List: 3.5 millimetres (0.14 in) TRRS; Bluetooth 3.0/4.0; Wi-Fi (802.11 a/b/g/n); Wi-Fi Direct; NFC; DLNA
- Data inputs: List: Multi-touch capacitive touchscreen; 3 push buttons; aGPS; GLONASS; Gyroscope; Accelerometer; Digital compass
- Other: Wi-Fi hotspot, AllShare, damage-resistant Gorilla Glass 2
- Website: Ativ S on samsung.com at the Wayback Machine (archived 2012-09-01)

The Samsung ATIV S is a touchscreen, slate smartphone manufactured by Samsung Electronics running the Windows Phone 8 operating system, upgradeable to Windows Phone 8.1. The ATIV S was Samsung's first Windows Phone 8 device, and one of the first devices under its ATIV series of Microsoft Windows-based products. It was shown at the IFA 2012 in Berlin and was the first Windows Phone 8 device to be officially unveiled, ahead of the Nokia Lumia 920.

There were three variants of the ATIV S. All feature a 4.8-inch 1280x720 HD Super AMOLED display with a pixel density of 306ppi, a 1.5 GHz dual-core processor, 1 GB of RAM, an 8-megapixel rear-facing camera, near field communications, and support for HSPA+ networks. Specific variants include:

- GT-I8750 - the globalized version of the ATIV S, with a 1.9MP front-facing camera
- GT-I8370 - a version specific to the UK, Canada and Singapore but with a 1.2MP front camera instead of 1.9MP
- SGH-T899M - sold in Canada, equipped with 700 MHz LTE and Bluetooth 2.1 (downgraded from 3.0)

The ATIV S was available with 16 or 32 GB of internal storage with micro SDXC expansion for up to an additional 128 GB or more. It further featured a 2300mAh removable battery and a brushed-metal look of the battery door. Overall, the hardware was very similar to the Android-based Galaxy S III.

A variant of the Samsung ATIV S, called the Samsung ATIV S Neo, was announced by Sprint on 26 June 2013 for a summer 2013 release, alongside the HTC 8XT. This phone's appearance is similar to the ATIV S, though has notable differences spec-wise, having 1.4 GHz processor speed, a 2000mAh battery, TFT LCD screen, and LTE connectivity.

== See also ==
- List of Windows Phone devices
- Windows Phone 8
- Windows Phone 8.1
- Windows Phone
- Samsung Ativ Odyssey
