= List of Windows phones =

List of Windows phones may refer to:

2010 and earlier phone devices

- List of Windows Mobile devices (Windows Mobile 2003, Windows Mobile 2003 Second Edition (SE), Windows Mobile 5.0, 6.0, 6.1, 6.5)

2010–2015 phone devices

- List of Windows Phone 7 devices
- List of Windows Phone 8 devices
- List of Windows Phone 8.1 devices

2015–2017 phone devices

- List of Windows 10 Mobile devices
