= Samsung ATIV SE =

Smartphone model

- Manufacturer: Samsung Electronics
- Type: Touchscreen smartphone
- Series: Samsung ATIV
- First released: April 2014
- Predecessor: Samsung ATIV S
- Related: Samsung Galaxy S4
- Compatible networks: 1700 MHz LTE (SGH-T899M); 2G GSM/GPRS/EDGE – 850, 900, 1,800, 1,900 MHz; HSPA – 700, 800, 1,700, 1,900, 2,100 MHz
- Form factor: Bar (Candybar)
- Dimensions: 138 mm × 70 mm × 8 mm (5.43 in × 2.76 in × 0.31 in)
- Weight: 136 g (4.8 oz)
- Operating system: Windows Phone 8
- CPU: 2.3 GHz quad-core Qualcomm Snapdragon 800
- GPU: Adreno 330
- Memory: 2 GB RAM
- Storage: 16 GB flash memory
- Removable storage: microSD up to 128GB (supports SDXC)
- Battery: 2,600 mAh, 7.98 Wh, 3.8 V Internal rechargeable li-ion User replaceable
- Rear camera: List: 13.0 megapixels back-side illuminated sensor; LED flash; HD video (1080p) at 30 frames/s; Aperture f/2.6; Autofocus; Zero shutter lag
- Front camera: 2.0 megapixels
- Display: List: 5.0 in (130 mm) diagonal with 16:9 aspect ratio widescreen; HD Super AMOLED touchscreen; 1920x1080 pixels (441 ppi) and RGBG-Matrix (PenTile); Contrast ratio: infinite (nominal) / 3.419:1 (sunlight); 16M colours
- Connectivity: List: 3.5 millimetres (0.14 in) TRRS; Bluetooth 3.0/4.0; Wi-Fi (802.11 a/b/g/n); Wi-Fi Direct; NFC; DLNA
- Data inputs: List: Multi-touch capacitive touchscreen; 3 push buttons; aGPS; GLONASS; Gyroscope; Accelerometer; Digital compass
- Other: Wi-Fi hotspot, AllShare, damage-resistant Corning Gorilla Glass 3
- References: http://www.samsung.com/us/mobile/cell-phones/SM-W750VMSAVZW http://www.gsmarena.com/samsung_ativ_se-6245.php

The Samsung ATIV SE is a smartphone manufactured by Samsung which runs Windows Phone 8. It is essentially a variant of the Galaxy S4 with Windows Phone instead of Android and a slightly revamped shell design.

The ATIV SE is an LTE device with a 5-inch 1080p AMOLED display, a 2.3 GHz quad-core Qualcomm Snapdragon 800 CPU, 2 GB RAM, 16 GB expandable storage memory, a pair of 13 MP rear and 2 MP front cameras with 1080p video recording, and a 2600 mAh battery. It includes some OEM apps in addition to the default Windows Phone apps such as Channel Surf for Smart TVs, Samsung Link for sharing content across devices, and ATIV Beam for sending files to Android devices.
