= LG Lancet =

- Brand: LG
- Manufacturer: LG Electronics, Inc.
- Type: Smartphone
- First released: 2015
- Weight: 143 g (5 oz)
- Operating system: Android 5.1.1 (Lollipop) Windows Phone 8.1
- CPU: 1.2 GHz Qualcomm Snapdragon MSM8916 Quad-Core
- Memory: 1024MB
- Storage: 8 GB
- Removable storage: microSDHC, 128 GB maximum
- SIM: microSIM
- Battery: Li-ion 2100 mAh
- Rear camera: 8 megapixel
- Front camera: 1 megapixel
- Display: 4,5" 854x480 pixel
- Connectivity: Wi-Fi 802.11 b/g/n, Bluetooth 4.1

The LG Lancet is a low-end budget smartphone made by LG Electronics. It was first launched as a Windows Phone 8.1 device in July 2015 and was made available in an Android 5.1 version in October of 2015. Both devices were available from Verizon Wireless.

== Features ==
The LG Lancet features a 4.5-inch touchscreen display with a 854 x 480 pixel screen resolution. It is powered by a 1.2 GHz Qualcomm Snapdragon Quad-core Processor (MSM8916). It has a 2,100 mAh battery with up to 17 days and 12 hours of standby time, according to LG. It has 8 GB internal storage, which can be expanded up to 128 GB. The device has been criticized for the quality of photos taken by its 8-megapixel primary camera and its 1 megapixel front-facing camera.

Verizon sold the Lancet for $120 off-contract and $69.99 on-contract. It was part of the three Windows devices sold during the period with the other two being the high-end HTC One (M8) and the mid-range Lumia 735.
