= List of Windows 10 Mobile devices =

List of the windows phone

This is a list of all devices coming natively with Microsoft's Windows 10 Mobile operating system. The list also includes devices running two additional flavours of Windows 10 for mobile devices, Windows 10 Mobile Enterprise and Windows 10 IoT Mobile Enterprise. All devices below come with SD card support.

Processors supported are Qualcomm's Snapdragon 210, 212, 410, 617, 800, 801, 808, 810 and 820 as well as Rockchip's RK3288.

== Devices ==
=== Phones ===
Product	Release date	CPU	RAM (GB)	Storage (GB)	Display			Camera (MP)	
Product	Release date	CPU	RAM (GB)	Storage (GB)	Resolution	Size (″/mm)	Type	Rear	Front
Acer Liquid M320	February 2016	Snapdragon 210	1	8	480p	4.5 inches (110 mm)	IPS LCD	5	2
Acer Liquid M330	February 2016	Snapdragon 210	1	8	480p	4.5 inches (110 mm)	IPS LCD	5	5
Archos Cesium 50	January 2016	Snapdragon 210	1	8	720p	5.0 inches (130 mm)	IPS LCD	8	2
Bush Eluma	January 2016	Snapdragon 210	1	16	720p	5.0 inches (130 mm)	IPS LCD	8	5
Cherry Mobile Alpha Prime 4	March 2016	Snapdragon 210	0.5	4	480p	4.0 inches (100 mm)	IPS LCD	5	2
Cherry Mobile Alpha Prime 5	March 2016	Snapdragon 210	1	8	720p	5.0 inches (130 mm)	IPS LCD	8	2
Coship Moly L08-W	February 2016	Snapdragon 210	1	8	480p	5.0 inches (130 mm)	IPS LCD	5	2
Demarec S40	February 2018	Snapdragon 210	1	8	480p	5.0 inches (130 mm)	IPS LCD	5	2
Coship Moly X5-W	March 2016	Snapdragon 210	1	8	720p	5.0 inches (130 mm)	IPS LCD	8	2
Covia BREEZ X5	April 2016	Snapdragon 210	1	8	720p	5.0 inches (130 mm)	IPS LCD	8	2
Diginnos Mobile DG-W10M	December 2015	Snapdragon 210	1	16	720p	5.0 inches (130 mm)	IPS LCD	8	2
Freetel Katana 01	December 2015	Snapdragon 210	1	8	480p	4.5 inches (110 mm)	IPS LCD	5	2
Freetel Katana 02	December 2015	Snapdragon 210	2	16	720p	5.0 inches (130 mm)	IPS LCD	8	2
Geanee WPJ40-10	January 2016	Snapdragon 210	1	8	480p^{1}	4.0 inches (100 mm)	TN LCD	5	2
Softbank 503LV	October 2016	Snapdragon 617	3	32	720p	5.0 inches (130 mm)	IPS LCD	8	5
Microsoft Lumia 550	December 2015	Snapdragon 210	1	8	720p	4.7 inches (120 mm)	IPS LCD	5	2
Microsoft Lumia 650	February 2016	Snapdragon 212	1	16	720p	5.0 inches (130 mm)	AMOLED	8	5
Microsoft Lumia 950	November 2015	Snapdragon 808	3	32	1440p	5.2 inches (130 mm)	AMOLED	20	5
Trinity NuAns Neo	January 2016	Snapdragon 617	2	16	720p	5.0 inches (130 mm)	IPS LCD	13	5
WhartonBrooks Cerulean Moment	March 2017	Snapdragon 617	3	32	720p	5.0 inches (130 mm)	IPS LCD	13	5
Silliscon May X1	January 2018	Qualcomm MSM8227	1	8	480p	5.0 inches (130 mm)	IPS LCD	5	0.3
Trekstor WinPhone 5.0	September 2017	Snapdragon 617	3	16	720p	5.0 inches (130 mm)	IPS LCD	13	5
Wileyfox Pro	September 2017	Snapdragon 210	2	16	720p	5.0 inches (130 mm)	IPS LCD	8	2
Xiaomi Mi 4	August 2014 ^{2}	Snapdragon 801	2 or 3	16 or 64	1080p	5.0 inches (130 mm)	IPS LCD	13	8

=== Phablets ===
Product	Release date	CPU	RAM (GB)	Storage (GB)	Battery (mAh)	Display			Camera (MP)	
Product	Release date	CPU	RAM (GB)	Storage (GB)	Battery (mAh)	Resolution	Size (″)	Type	Rear	Front
Microsoft Lumia 950 XL	November 2015	Snapdragon 810	3	32	3340	1440p	5.7	AMOLED	20	5
Acer Jade Primo	February 2016	Snapdragon 808	3	32	2800	1080p	5.5	AMOLED	21	8
Alcatel OneTouch Fierce XL	January 2016	Snapdragon 210	2	16	2500	720p	5.5	IPS LCD	8	2
Alcatel Idol 4S	November 2016	Snapdragon 820	4	64	3000	1080p	5.5	AMOLED	21	8
ARP XC01Q	April 2016	Snapdragon 410	2	32	2600	720p	5.5	IPS LCD	13	5
Coship Moly X1-W	January 2016	Snapdragon 410	2	16	2600	720p	5.5	IPS LCD	13	5
Coship Moly PCPhone X7-W	April 2016	Snapdragon 617	3	32	3900	1080p	6.0	IPS LCD	13	5
CUBE WP10	August 2016	Snapdragon 210	2	16	2850	720p	6.98	IPS LCD	5	2
Funker W5.5 Pro	February 2016	Snapdragon 410	2	16	2600	720p	5.5	IPS LCD	13	5
Funker W6.0 Pro 2	June 2016	Snapdragon 617	3	32	3900	1080p	6.0	IPS LCD	13	5
HP Elite X3	September 2016	Snapdragon 820	4	64	4150	1440p	5.96	AMOLED	16	8
Mouse Computer MADOSMA Q601	September 2016	Snapdragon 617	3	32	3900	1080p	6.0	AMOLED	13	5
VAIO Phone Biz	April 2016	Snapdragon 617	3	16	2800	1080p	5.5	AMOLED	13	5
Yamada Denki EveryPhone	December 2015	Snapdragon 410	2	32	2600	720p	5.5	IPS LCD	13	5

=== Tablets ===
Product	Release date	CPU	RAM (GB)	Storage (GB)	Display			Camera (MP)	
Product	Release date	CPU	RAM (GB)	Storage (GB)	Resolution	Size (″)	Type	Rear	Front
Atek Aikun S79	August 2016	Snapdragon 210	1	8	1024 x 600	6.95	IPS LCD	5	2
Alcatel OneTouch Pixi 3(8)	March 2016	Snapdragon 210	1	8	1280 x 800	8.0	IPS LCD	5	2
Pipo U8T	March 2016	RockChip RK3288	1 or 2	16 or 32	1024 x 768	7.85	IPS LCD	5	2

=== Rugged devices ===
Product	Release date	CPU	RAM (GB)	Storage (GB)	Display			Camera (MP)	
Product	Release date	CPU	RAM (GB)	Storage (GB)	Resolution	Size (″)	Type	Rear	Front
Bluebird EF400	February 2016	Snapdragon 410	2	8 or 16	720p	4.0	IPS LCD	13	1.3
Bluebird EF500/EF500R	June 2016	Snapdragon 410	2	8	720p	5.0	IPS LCD	13	1.3
Best Source RMQ5018	August 2016	Snapdragon 210	1	8	720p	5.0	IPS LCD	8	2
Janam XT2	September 2016	Snapdragon 410	1 or 2	8 or 16	720p	5.0	IPS LCD	8	2
M3 SM10LTE	October 2016	Snapdragon 410	2	16	720p	5.0	IPS LCD	8	5
Panasonic ToughPad FZ-F1	October 2016	Snapdragon 801	2	16	720p	4.7	IPS LCD	8	5
Zebra TC70x	June 2017	Snapdragon 808 1.7 GHz	2 or 4	16 or 32	720p	4.7	IPS LCD	8	1.3

== See also ==
- Windows 10 Mobile version history
- Windows 10 Mobile
- List of Windows Phone 8 devices
- List of Windows Phone 8.1 devices

== Notes ==
- ^1 This is currently the only device to both ship with Windows 10 Mobile and use an 800 x 480 screen resolution.
- ^2 Windows 10 Mobile for this device is available from June 2015.
