= Joe Belfiore =

American business executive

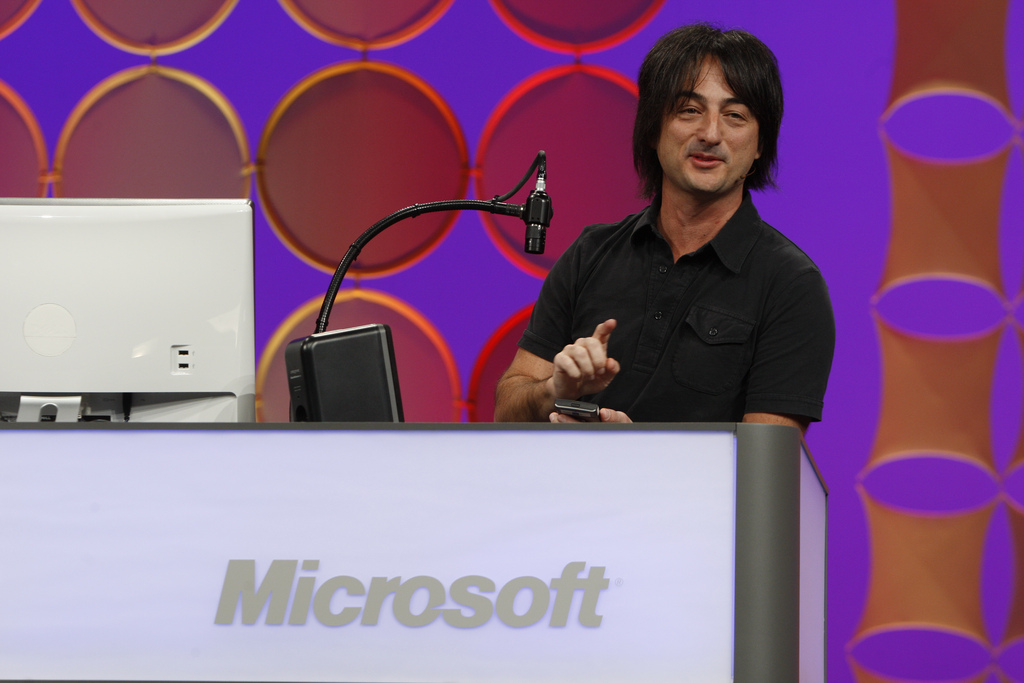
- Joe Belfiore shares news at MIX10.
- Born: c. 1968; Tampa Bay, Florida, United States
- Education: Stanford University
- Occupations: Microsoft Corporate Vice President, Windows and Devices Group
- Years active: 1990–present
- Spouse: Kristina Belfiore
- Children: 3

Joe Belfiore is an American business executive who has held various roles at Microsoft since August 1990, mostly in the field of user experience. A frequent speaker, Belfiore has appeared at many Microsoft conferences, often giving demos on stage and/or acting as a spokesperson for the company. In 2018, he was named the #1 Microsoft Influencer for fans to follow on Twitter. In 2004, he gave a TED Talk in-person at the TED Conference in Monterey, CA. In summer 2023 he retired from Microsoft and is now active as chair of a non-profit board.

== Early life ==
Born in Tampa Bay, Florida, Belfiore became enamoured with computers as a child through his experience with a Timex Sinclair 1000 belonging to the father of a fellow kid in his neighborhood. He attended Clearwater Central Catholic High School and graduated in 1986. He then attended Stanford University, graduating with a bachelor's degree in computer science in 1990.

== Career at Microsoft ==
=== Windows 95, Windows XP and Internet Explorer ===
Soon after graduation he was hired by Microsoft, and in his first job he worked as Program Manager for OS/2, but this post was short-lived as Microsoft ended its partnership with IBM regarding OS/2. He moved over to the Windows NT team and was responsible for program management of the Windows NT user experience.

In 1993 he moved to the Windows team and became lead program manager for the user interface of "Chicago", a project which became Windows 95. In that role, he was a key person to introduce the start menu, taskbar, and Explorer to Windows. Following this, he worked on user interface for Internet Explorer 3 and Internet Explorer 4, including IE4's Windows integrated shell. Belfiore then became manager for user experience in Windows 2000 and Windows XP, including the engineering and design team that created the Windows XP user interface.

=== Windows Media Center & Zune ===
In 2002 Belfiore joined Microsoft's new eHome division as General Manager for eHome user interface, first shipped as Windows XP Media Center Edition. Later becoming vice president of the division, he was also responsible for design, business and marketing of Windows Media Center and related products, including "Media Center Extenders"—hardware devices that displayed the Media Center experience on TV sets around the home, and the Xbox 360 Media Center Extender. As part of this effort, Belfiore negotiated a deal with US cable companies to enable PCs to consume and broadcast digital TV signals around the home.

In 2008 he became corporate vice president of the Zune division, responsible for the Zune PC client and services.

=== Windows Phone & the "Metro" design language ===
In February 2009, Belfiore moved over to the Mobile Communications Business division, which was responsible for Windows Mobile. He became Director of Program Management and his team worked on the creation of the Metro user interface in upcoming Windows Phone 7, which had influences from previous Windows Media Center design, and was rolled-out to many other Microsoft products including Xbox 360 and Windows 8.

In addition he led the effort to create Cortana and many other aspects of the platform; he served as the face of the company's Windows Phone efforts.

Belfiore was forced to apologize in 2011 to unhappy Windows Phone 7 users after complaints that updates promised by Belfiore were not rolled out to users.

On October 8, 2017, in response to a Twitter question about Windows Phone, Belfiore broke Microsoft's silence about the platform by saying it will continue to be supported for bug fixes and security only, but no new features or hardware. This clarified Microsoft's position that the platform, then having fallen below 1% market share, is on end of life support amid ongoing rumors of a "Surface Phone". Media interpreted this tweet as a final confirmation that Windows Phone was "dead". In a second tweet to another user he wrote:

We have tried VERY HARD to incent app devs. Paid money.. wrote apps 4 them.. but volume of users is too low for most companies to invest. :(

=== Windows 10 ===
In the summer of 2013, Belfiore was named the leader of the "PC/Tablet/Phone" vertical in the Operating Systems Group at Microsoft, responsible for delivering Windows 10 on PCs, tablets and phones. This group significantly updated the Windows desktop experience, owned and created the Cortana digital assistant, and created the "Continuum" feature set, which enables 2-in-1 PCs (like the Surface) to transform between "PC Mode" and "Tablet Mode"; and additionally enables Windows Phone devices to connect to a keyboard, mouse and monitor and work in a PC-like experience. The team was also responsible for apps built-in to Windows 10, including the rewrite of Internet Explorer as Microsoft Edge.

In Fall 2015, after Windows 10 shipped, Belfiore announced that a 9-month leave of absence from Microsoft to travel around the world with his family aboard the MV World Odyssey. While on this leave, Belfiore was noted for using an iPhone and Galaxy S7 as two of his primary-use phones. After returning from leave, Belfiore resumed work on Windows 10 and, influenced by his use of non-Microsoft phones, announced many new features at Build 2017, notably cross-platform features enabling "Windows PCs to love all your devices"—including iOS and Android phones. From that date, he became responsible for the mobile experiences of Microsoft Edge and Microsoft Launcher.

=== Microsoft Office ===
In 2020 it was announced Belfiore would lead the Microsoft Office Experience Group, while still leading the group that involves Microsoft mobile apps for the iOS and Android platforms.

On October 27, 2022, Belfiore announced his retirement from Microsoft, to be effective early summer 2023.

== Other ventures ==
=== The Game ===
Belfiore is also known for being the founder of the non-stop 24- to 48-hour treasure hunt The Game, run in the San Francisco Bay and Seattle areas.

At TED 2004 in Monterey, California he delivered a TED Talk on "The Game" where he caused the cell phones of most audience members to ring, leaving them with a trail of clues to solve at the TED conference.

=== Seattle Sounders ownership ===
In August 2019, Belfiore and his wife Kristina joined the ownership group of Seattle Sounders FC, a Major League Soccer club.

=== Awards ===
His work on Windows 10 earned him kudos as Stuff magazine's #16 innovator of the year for 2015 and in May 2013, he was recognized by Business Insider as the #10 Best Designer in Technology.

== Personal life ==
Belfiore is married to Kristina Belfiore who also graduated from Stanford in 1990 and worked at Microsoft for 32 years. They live in Bellevue, Washington and have 3 children.
