= Microsoft Launcher =

Application launcher for Android mobiles

- Screenshot Microsoft Launcher's screenshot
- Developer: Microsoft
- Release: October 2015 (as Arrow Launcher)
- Stable release: 6.260402.0.1178950
- Operating system: Android 7.0 and newer
- Platform: Android
- Predecessor: Windows 10 Mobile (after end of support)
- Size: 36.9 MB
- Type: Application launcher

Microsoft Launcher is an application launcher for the Android mobile platform developed by Microsoft and intended to provide a more convenient integration between Windows desktop PCs and Android smartphones. Originally available as a beta since October 2015 under the name Arrow Launcher, the first stable release was published to the Google Play Store, under its current name, on October 5, 2017. It does not replace the stock Android operating system, but adds an additional graphical layer with a focus on Microsoft applications and services.

In December 2017, it was reported that Microsoft Launcher had reached 10 million downloads from Google Play.
