= HTC Windows Phone 8X =

Smartphone produced by HTC

Windows Phone 8X by HTC
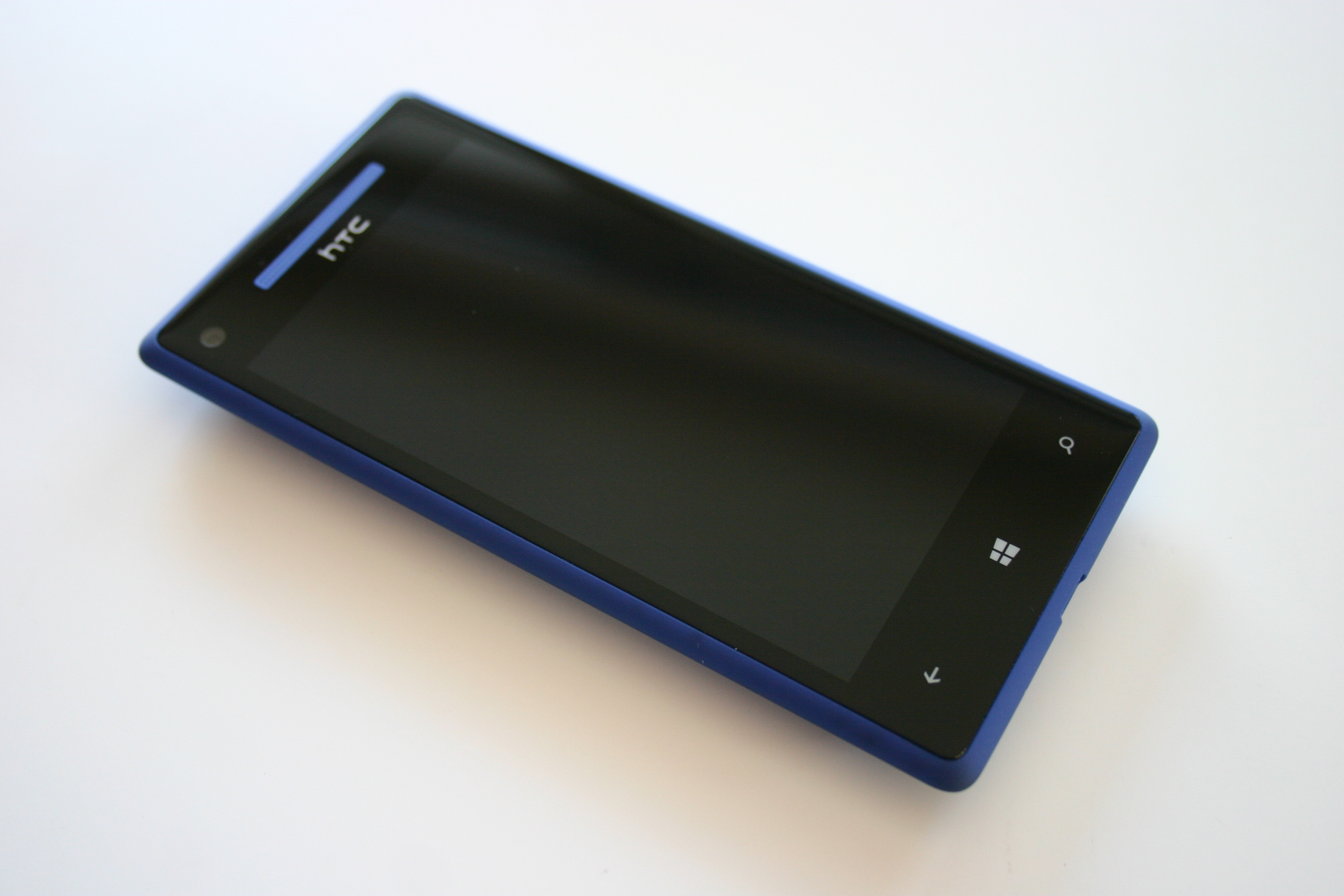
- Manufacturer: HTC Corporation
- Type: Smartphone
- First released: Q4 2012
- Related: Windows Phone 8S by HTC
- Compatible networks: GSM/GPRS/EDGE 850/900/1800/1900; HSPA 850/900/1900/2100
- Form factor: Bar
- Dimensions: 132.35 mm × 66.2 mm × 10.12 mm (5.211 in × 2.606 in × 0.398 in)
- Weight: 130 g (5 oz)
- Operating system: Windows Phone 8 (upgradable to Windows Phone 8.1)
- System-on-chip: Qualcomm Snapdragon S4 MSM8960
- CPU: 1.5 GHz dual-core Qualcomm Krait
- GPU: Qualcomm Adreno 225
- Memory: 16 GB internal flash 1 GB RAM
- Removable storage: None
- Battery: 1800 mAh Li-ion battery
- Rear camera: 8.0-megapixel
- Front camera: 2.1-megapixel
- Display: 4.3" Super LCD 2; 1280 x 720 px at 342 ppi
- Connectivity: Bluetooth 3.1+EDR, NFC
- Data inputs: Multi-touch capacitive touchscreen, proximity sensor, ambient light sensor

The Windows Phone 8X by HTC (codenamed Accord) is a smartphone that was announced by HTC Corporation on September 19, 2012.

== Availability ==
=== North America ===
United States

The HTC 8x used to be available on T-Mobile US, Verizon, and AT&T. Only the Verizon and AT&T models support LTE. The T-Mobile/International Version doesn't as it uses the Qualcomm MSM8260A chipset. While the 8X has NFC capabilities, wireless charging is only supported by devices on the Verizon Wireless network. Additionally, "Data Sense," a new feature of Windows Phone 8 that helps users keep track of their cellular data usage, was initially only available on Windows Phones connected with the Verizon Wireless network. Data Sense later became available with other carriers.

=== Europe ===
United Kingdom

Vodafone announced that the HTC Windows Phone 8X would be available in the United Kingdom starting 6 February 2013.

== Reception ==
Chuong Nguyen from Gotta Be Mobile in his review wrote: "From a hardware perspective, HTC has done a great job creating a minimalist and modern design. It’s the software still that may be the big barrier for Windows Phone adoption as the platform still trails behind popular rivals iOS and Android in some key areas, including search, voice commands, and voice-guided navigation." and "And while the software is more refined, it just seems that Microsoft is just catching up to rivals, but with Windows Phone 8, it’s still clear that the platform still hasn’t fully caught up quite just yet."

Phil Lavelle from TechRadar wrote: "The HTC 8X promised so much on paper and the excitement leading to it arriving was building up for us. Yet when it arrived, we found it to be a mediocre handset and this is the best of the two WP8 phones HTC is launching. Which means it's not even the best value."

Myriam Joire from Engadget wrote: "Yes, the 8X is a fantastic ambassador to Windows Phone 8, but after using it for several days, we're longing for a similar phone from HTC running Android -- at least until a stronger app ecosystem develops for Microsoft's latest mobile OS."

The HTC 8X won a Red Dot Product Design award in 2013. Prof. Dr. Peter Zec, initiator and CEO of the red dot design award, said: “HTC’s Windows Phone 8X and 8S not only demonstrated an extraordinary design quality, but also showed that design is an integral part of innovative product solutions. We are pleased to award the ‘red dot’ to HTC.”

Some reviewers noted some problems. The phone reboots randomly, which was supposed to be solved after the "Portico" update, but after the update it sometimes continues rebooting randomly. The color coating also peels off revealing a smooth undercoat.

== Windows 10 ==
Despite earlier rumours, it is confirmed that the HTC Windows Phone 8X will not be upgraded to Windows 10 Mobile.

== See also ==
- Windows Phone 8S by HTC
