= Nokia Lumia 520 =

Windows Phone smartphone manufactured by Nokia

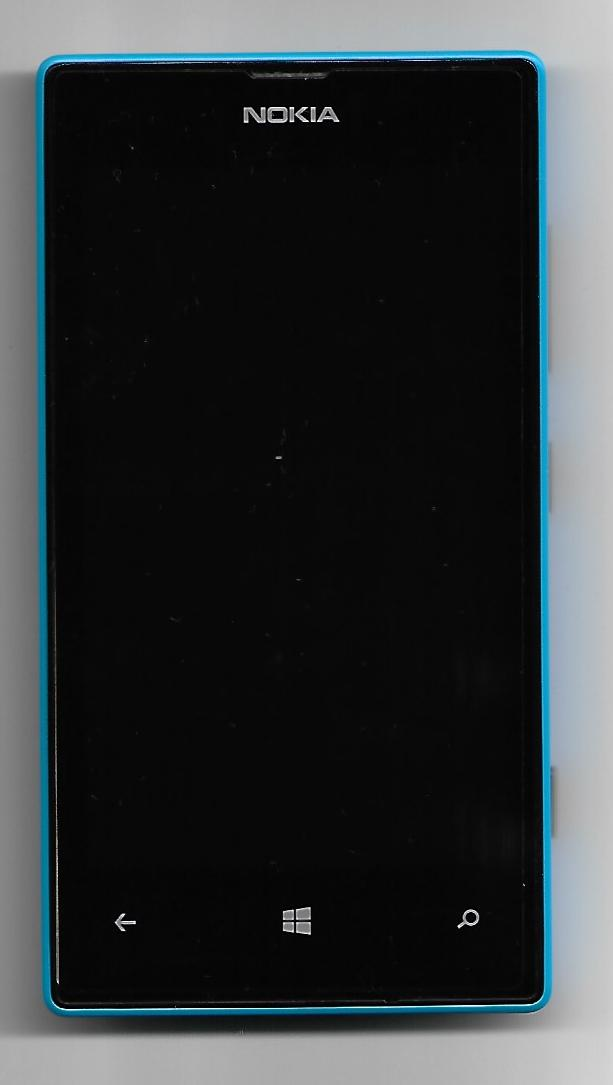
- Nokia Lumia 520
- Brand: Nokia
- Manufacturer: Nokia
- Type: Smartphone
- Series: Lumia
- First released: 1 April 2013
- Availability by region: 2 April 2013
- Discontinued: 2015
- Predecessor: Nokia Lumia 510
- Successor: Nokia Lumia 525; Nokia Lumia 530; Microsoft Lumia 535
- Related: Nokia Lumia 620; Nokia Lumia 720; Nokia Lumia 820; Nokia Lumia 920
- Compatible networks: GSM/GPRS/EDGE 850/900/1800/1900; HSPA 1900/2100
- Form factor: Slate
- Dimensions: 119.9 mm (4.72 in) H 64 mm (2.5 in) W 9.9 mm (0.39 in) D
- Weight: 124 g (4.4 oz)
- Operating system: Windows Phone 8, upgradeable to 8.1; Windows 10 Mobile insider beta, later discontinued Unofficial Android 6.0.1 port from XDA-developers
- System-on-chip: Qualcomm Snapdragon S4 MSM8227
- CPU: 1.0 GHz dual-core Qualcomm Krait
- GPU: Qualcomm Adreno 305
- Memory: 512 MB RAM
- Storage: 8 GB Internal
- Removable storage: 64 GB, microSD
- Battery: 1430 mAh (stand-by time 4 days)
- Rear camera: 5 MP autofocus, f/2.4, autofocus 720p video
- Display: 4-inch IPS LCD, 480x800 resolution
- Connectivity: Bluetooth 4.0 + LE (after Lumia Amber update); Assisted GPS; GPS/GLONASS; Micro-USB 2.0; Wi-Fi :802.11b/g/n, WiFi Hotspot; Wi-Fi-based positioning system (WPS); FM radio, Internet radio
- Data inputs: Multi-touch capacitive touchscreen, ambient light sensor, proximity sensor
- Other: Talk time (2G): up to 14.8 hours Talk time (3G): 9.6 h Stand-by time: up to 360 hours (15 days); Maximum cellular network browsing time: 6.7 h Music playback time: 61 h (2.5 days)

The Nokia Lumia 520 is an entry-level Windows Phone 8 smartphone announced by Nokia at the 2013 Mobile World Congress.

In September 2013, the Lumia 520 became the best-selling Windows device in the world, selling more units than any other model of Windows phone, PC or tablet. By July 2014, the Lumia 520 has had 12 million activations, and has played a key part for Nokia and Microsoft.

A minor successor, the Nokia Lumia 525, was later released.

== Hardware ==
The Lumia 520 comes in a slate shape with 4-inch SuperSensitive touchscreen. The viewing angles are slightly reduced compared to other phones in the Lumia line. The Lumia 520 shares the same screen resolution of 800x480 as the more expensive Lumia 620, 720 and 820, and actually has a higher pixel density than the 720. The touchscreen is designed to be sensitive enough that one can use it while wearing gloves or with fingernails.

Aside from the screen, the front of the phone contains the Windows Phone 8 standard Back, Start and Search buttons, along with a speaker. The back houses a sole 5 MP camera sensor with autofocus and two-stage capture, but no LED. The sides of the phone also have standard Windows Phone features, as required by Microsoft – volume keys, camera key, power/lock key, 3.5 mm headphone jack and micro-USB connector, which is also used for charging purposes. The phone does not have a front-facing camera or a digital compass. The Lumia 520 ships with 8 GB (8 × 2^{30} bytes) of internal storage with about 3 GB of the storage taken up by the operating system.

The Lumia 520 has a 1430 mAh battery, which is larger than the 1300 mAh battery in the Lumia 620. The 520 is also slimmer and lighter than the 620, but at the same time longer and wider due to its bigger screen. To reduce the production costs, the 520 lacks Nokia ClearBlack display, a front-facing camera, NFC, camera flash and a compass.

=== Nokia Lumia 525 ===
The Nokia Lumia 525 launched as the successor to the Nokia Lumia 520 with nearly the same specifications and appearance. The Lumia 525 doubles the RAM from 512 MB to 1 GB, therefore making it compatible with more demanding games and apps. The back shell is also now glossy instead of matte. It is offered in black, white, orange, and yellow colors which can be swapped via removable shells.

This phone was first launched in Singapore on December 14, 2013, followed by an India launch in the first week of January 2014.

A special variant of the Nokia Lumia 525, dubbed Nokia Lumia 526, was released in January 2014 as an exclusive partnership with China Mobile. The hardware is otherwise identical to the Nokia Lumia 525.

== Software ==
The Lumia 520 ships with Microsoft Windows Phone 8, as well as exclusive software like Nokia Mix Radio and HERE Maps (featuring turn-by-turn directions, offline maps and navigation, and transit info). The phone received the Lumia Amber software update in mid-2013, which brought numerous bug fixes and improvements, including the ability to capture steadier images, and the Lumia Black update in late 2013.

The Lumia 520 can be upgraded to Windows Phone 8.1 as part of the Lumia Cyan update. Although a port was initially released as an insider preview, the phone will not receive the upgrade to Windows 10 Mobile, which has been attributed to being due to having only 512 MB of RAM.

An Android Marshmallow 6.0.1 port to the phone is underway at XDA Developers, after developers became able to replace the UEFI bootloader used for Windows with the Qualcomm Little Kernel bootloader used to boot Android and other Linux-based operating systems.

== Reception ==
CNET called the Lumia 520 "tremendous value on an easy-to-use device"; and said of its variant, the Lumia 521, "Though it lacks 4G LTE support, the $150 Nokia Lumia 521 still gives you quite a bit for your money. Pricing is absolutely this phone's primary value proposition, but the essentials all seem to work, the hardware is sturdy, and the camera is better than average."

The price of the Lumia 520 was halved to $50 in the United States and £70 in the UK for Christmas 2013 season.

== Limitation ==
Similar to other budget phones like the Lumia 620 and Lumia 720, it only has 512 MB of RAM, half the RAM of the first Windows Phone 8 devices, causing certain applications and features to not run. On 27 November 2013, the Nokia Lumia 525 was announced in Singapore. It increases the RAM to 1 GB to allow all Windows Phone features and applications to run.

== 520 Variants ==
A special variant, the Nokia Lumia 521, was created for T-Mobile US. The 521 is slightly longer than the 520 at 124.0 mm (vs. 119.9 mm), so accessories such as cases and screen protectors manufactured for the 520 do not fit the 521. The Nokia Lumia 521's first retail release was on 27 April 2013.

Model	RM-913	RM-914	RM-915	RM-917
Countries	China	International	United States	United States
Carriers/Providers	China Mobile	n/a	AT&T	T-Mobile US, MetroPCS
2G	Quad band GSM/EDGE (850/900/1800/1900 MHz)			
3G	TD-SCDMA 1900/2000 MHz	900/2100 MHz	850/1900/2100 MHz	850/AWS/1900
Max network speed	HSPA+: 21 Mbit/s			

== See also ==
- Microsoft Lumia
- Nokia Lumia 525
- Nokia X, X+, XL
- Nokia Lumia 530
- Microsoft Lumia 535
- Microsoft Lumia 540
- Microsoft Lumia 550
- Nokia Lumia 635/630
