= List of Windows Phone 8.1 devices =

This is a list of all devices running Microsoft's Windows Phone 8.1 operating system.

In addition to existing Windows Phone 8 partners HTC, Samsung and Huawei, Gionee, JSR, Karbonn, LG, Lenovo, Longcheer, XOLO, and ZTE signed on to create Windows Phone 8.1 devices in early 2014. Miia, Micromax, Prestigio, Yezz, BLU, K-Touch and InFocus were subsequently named as hardware partners later on in the year.

Nokia's devices division was acquired by Microsoft in early 2014 and has since been rebranded as Microsoft Mobile. Microsoft Mobile continued to release Nokia-branded handsets running Windows Phone until a clearer strategy for aligning the Microsoft and Nokia brands was decided on in October 2014. This was to replace the Nokia name on future Lumia devices with Microsoft Lumia branding. The first device released without Nokia branding was the Lumia 535.

== Devices ==
=== Dual-core 480p ===
Devices feature a dual core processor, 480p screen with 480x800 resolution and a microSD card reader.

Product	Release date	CPU (GHz)	RAM (GB)	Storage (GB)	Display		Camera (MP)	
Product	Release date	CPU (GHz)	RAM (GB)	Storage (GB)	Size (″)	Type	Rear	Front
Acer Liquid M220	April 2015	Snapdragon 200 (1.2)	0.5; 1	4; 8	4.0	TN LCD	5	2
Hisense Nana	August 2014	Snapdragon 200 (1.2)	0.5	4	5.0	TN LCD	2	—N/a
Microsoft Lumia 430	April 2015	Snapdragon 200 (1.2)	1	8	4.0	TN LCD	2	0.3
Microsoft Lumia 435	February 2015	Snapdragon 200 (1.2)	1	8	4.0	TN LCD	2	0.3

=== Quad-core 480p ===
These devices feature quad core processors, 480p screens with 480x800 or 480x854 resolution and microSD card readers. The devices use Snapdragon 200, 400 or 410 processors.

Product	Release date	CPU (GHz)	RAM (GB)	Storage (GB)	Display		Camera (MP)	
Product	Release date	CPU (GHz)	RAM (GB)	Storage (GB)	Size (″)	Type	Rear	Front
Alcatel One Touch Pixi 3(4)	March 2015	1.1	0.5	4	4	TFT	2; 5	0.3; 1.3
Alcatel One Touch Pixi 3(4.5)	March 2015	1.1	1	4	4.5	TFT	8	2
Alcatel One Touch Pixi 3(5)	March 2015	1.1	1	4; 8	5.0	TFT	8	2
Alcatel One Touch Pop 2(4)	January 2015	Snapdragon 410 (1.2)	1	4	4	IPS LCD	5	0.3
Alcatel One Touch Pop 2(4.5)	January 2015	Snapdragon 410 (1.2)	1	8	4.5	IPS LCD	5	0.3
Allview Impera M	November 2014	Snapdragon 200 (1.2)	0.5	8	4.0	TFT	5	0.3
Archos Cesium 40	September 2014	Snapdragon 200 (1.2)	0.5	4	4.0	TN LCD	5	0.3
Banglalink Aamra A10B	September 2015	Snapdragon 200 (1.3)	1	8	4.0	TN LCD	5	0.3
BLU Win Jr.	September 2014	Snapdragon 200 (1.2)	0.5	4	4.0	TN LCD	5	0.3
BLU Win Jr. LTE	May 2015	Snapdragon 410 (1.2)	0.5; 1	4; 8	4.5	IPS LCD	5	0.3
Bush Eluma B1	October 2014	1.2	0.5	4	4.0	TN LCD	5	0.3
Celkon Win 400	November 2014	Snapdragon 200 (1.3)	0.5	4	4.0	IPS LCD	5	1.3
Cherry Mobile Alpha Style	September 2014	Snapdragon 200 (1.2)	0.5	4	4.0	IPS LCD	5	0.3
Condor Griffe W1	June 2015	Snapdragon 200 (1.2)	1	8	4.0	IPS LCD	5	0.3
Danew Konnect W40	September 2014	Snapdragon 200 (1.2)	0.5	4	4.0	TN LCD	5	0.3
Edcon Verssed W1	December 2014	Snapdragon 200 (1.2)	0.5	4	4.0	TN LCD	5	0.3
Fly IQ400W Era	September 2014	Snapdragon 200 (1.2)	0.5	4	4.0	IPS LCD	5	0.3
Highscreen WinJoy	October 2014	Snapdragon 200 (1.2)	0.5	4	4.0	TN LCD	5	0.3
Highscreen WinWin	October 2014	Snapdragon 200 (1.2)	0.5	4	4.0	TN LCD	5	0.3
iBall Andi 4L Pulse	December 2014	Snapdragon 200 (1.2)	1	4	4.0	TFT	5	2
Innos A40B	March 2015	Snapdragon 200 (1.2)	0.5	4	4.0	TFT	5	0.3
Karbonn Titanium Wind W4	September 2014	Snapdragon 200 (1.2)	0.5	4	4.0	TN LCD	5	0.3
KAZAM Thunder 340W	December 2014	1.2	0.5	4	4.0	IPS LCD	5	0.3
K-touch 5703A	April 2015	1.2	0.5	8	4.5	IPS LCD	5	0.3
K-touch E8	March 2015	1.2	0.5	4	4.0	IPS LCD	5	0.3
K-touch 5757A	March 2015	1.2	0.5	4	4.5	TFT	5	0.3
Lanix Ilium W250	July 2015	Snapdragon 200 (1.2)	1	8	4.0	IPS LCD	5	1
Lava Iris Win1	December 2014	Snapdragon 200 (1.2)	1	8	4.0	TN LCD	5	0.3
LG Lancet	May 2015	Snapdragon 410 (1.2)	1	8	4.5	TFT LCD	8	0.3
Kruger&Matz Move 4	November 2015	Snapdragon 200 (1.2)	1	8	4.8	IPS LCD	5	2
Micromax Canvas Win W092	September 2014	Snapdragon 200 (1.2)	1	8	4.0	IPS LCD	5	0.3
Microsoft Lumia 532	February 2015	Snapdragon 200 (1.2)	1	8	4.0	TN LCD	5	0.3
Nokia Lumia 530	August 2014	Snapdragon 200 (1.2)	0.5	4	4.0	TN LCD	5	—N/a
Nokia Lumia 630 series (includes 630, 635, 636 and 638)	May 2014	Snapdragon 400 (1.2)	0.5; 1	8	4.5	ClearBlack IPS LCD	5	—N/a
Pinnacle Proline SP4	January 2015	Snapdragon 200 (1.2)	0.5	4	4.0	TN LCD	5	0.3
Polaroid Advance 4	January 2015	1.2	0.5	4	4.0	TN LCD	5	0.3
Prestigio MultiPhone 8400 DUO	August 2014	Snapdragon 200 (1.2)	0.5	4	4.0	IPS LCD	8	0.3
QMobile W1	May 2015	Snapdragon 200 (1.2)	0.5	4	4.0	IPS LCD	5	0.3
Q-Smart Storm W408	August 2014	Snapdragon 200 (1.2)	0.5	4	4.0	IPS LCD	5	0.3
Q-Smart Storm W510	August 2014	Snapdragon 200 (1.2)	1	4	5.0	IPS LCD	8	2
Q-Smart Storm W410	August 2014	Snapdragon 200 (1.2)	1	4	4.0	IPS LCD	5	0.3
Tempo Onix 4	February 2015	1.2	0.5	4	4.0	TN LCD	5	0.3
Yezz Billy 4.0	October 2014	Snapdragon 200 (1.2)	0.5	4	4.0	IPS LCD	8	1.3

=== Quad-core 540p ===
The Microsoft Lumia 535 features a quad core Snapdragon 200 processor, qHD screen at 540x960 resolution and a microSD card reader.

Product	Release date	CPU (GHz)	RAM (GB)	Storage (GB)	Display		Camera (MP)	
Product	Release date	CPU (GHz)	RAM (GB)	Storage (GB)	Size (″)	Type	Rear	Front
Microsoft Lumia 535	November 2014	Snapdragon 200 (1.2)	1	8	5.0	IPS LCD	5	5

=== Quad-core 720p ===
These devices feature quad core processors, 720p screens at 720x1280 resolution and microSD card readers. The devices use Snapdragon 200, 400 or 410 processors.

Product	Release date	CPU (GHz)	RAM (GB)	Storage (GB)	Display		Camera (MP)	
Product	Release date	CPU (GHz)	RAM (GB)	Storage (GB)	Size (″)	Type	Rear	Front
Allview Impera I	August 2014	Snapdragon 200 (1.2)	1	8	4.7	IPS LCD	8	2
Allview Impera S	August 2014	Snapdragon 200 (1.2)	1	8	5.0	IPS LCD	8	2
BLU Win HD	September 2014	Snapdragon 200 (1.2)	1	8	5.0	IPS LCD	8	2
BLU Win HD LTE	April 2015	Snapdragon 410 (1.2)	1	8	5.0	IPS LCD	8	2
Cherry Mobile Alpha Luxe	September 2014	Snapdragon 200 (1.2)	1	8	5.0	IPS LCD	8	2
Cherry Mobile Alpha Neon	March 2015	Snapdragon 200 (1.2)	1	4	5.0	IPS LCD	8	2
Cherry Mobile Alpha View	March 2015	Snapdragon 200 (1.2)	1	8	6.0	IPS LCD	8	2
Danew Konnect W50	September 2014	Snapdragon 200 (1.2)	1	8	5.0	IPS LCD	8	2
Dexp Ixion W 5	February 2015	Snapdragon 200 (1.2)	1	8	5.0	IPS LCD	8	2
Colors Mobile Win W10	February 2015	Snapdragon 200 (1.2)	1	4	4.7	IPS LCD	8	2
eSense Q47	November 2014	Snapdragon 200 (1.2)	1	4	4.7	IPS LCD	8	2
FPT Win	November 2014	Snapdragon 200 (1.2)	1	8	5.0	IPS LCD	8	2
FreeTel Ninja	June 2015	1.2	1	8	5.0	IPS LCD	8	2
Goclever Insignia 500 WIN	August 2015	1.3	1	8	5.0	IPS LCD	8	2
Hisense MIRA6	August 2014	Snapdragon 200 (1.2)	1	8	5.0	IPS LCD	8	5
IM HI M1010	August 2015	Snapdragon 200 (1.2)	1	8	5.0	IPS LCD	5	2
Innos i62SE	March 2015	Snapdragon 200 (1.2)	1	8	5.0	OGS	8	2
Innos i7 series (includes i7 and i7b)	August 2014	1.2	1	8	4.7	IPS LCD	8	2
Innos M54TE	March 2015	1.2	1	8	5.0	IPS LCD	8	2
KAZAM Thunder 450W	June 2015	Snapdragon 200 (1.2)	1	8	5.0	IPS LCD	8	2
KAZAM Thunder 450WL	June 2015	Snapdragon 410 (1.2)	1	8	5.0	IPS LCD	8	2
K-touch 5705A	April 2015	Snapdragon 200 (1.2)	1	8	5.0	IPS LCD	8	2
Kruger&Matz Soul 2	March 2015	Snapdragon 200 (1.2)	1	8	4.7	IPS LCD	8	2
Lumia 730 series (includes Nokia Lumia 730, Nokia Lumia 735 and Microsoft Lumia 735)	September 2014	Snapdragon 400 (1.2)	1	8	4.7	ClearBlack AMOLED	6.7	5
Micromax Canvas Win W121	August 2014	Snapdragon 200 (1.2)	1	8	5.0	IPS LCD	8	2
Microsoft Lumia 540	April 2015	Snapdragon 200 (1.2)	1	8	5.0	ClearBlack IPS LCD	8	5
Microsoft Lumia 640	April 2015	Snapdragon 400 (1.2)	1	8	5.0	ClearBlack IPS LCD	8	1
Microsoft Lumia 640 XL	April 2015	Snapdragon 400 (1.2)	1	8	5.7	ClearBlack IPS LCD	13	5
Miia Phone iimotion MWP-47	September 2014	Snapdragon 200 (1.2)	1	8	4.7	IPS LCD	8	2
Mobell Nova Windows	September 2014	Snapdragon 200 (1.2)	1	8	5.0	IPS LCD	8	2
Mouse Computer MADOSMA Q501	June 2015	Snapdragon 410 (1.2)	1	16	5.0	IPS LCD	8	2
My Go GoPhone GFW47	December 2014	Snapdragon 200 (1.2)	1	8	4.7	IPS LCD	8	2
NGM Harley-Davidson	September 2014	Snapdragon 400 (1.2)	1	8; 16	5.0	IPS LCD	8	2
Nokia Lumia 830	September 2014	Snapdragon 400 (1.2)	1	16	5.0	ClearBlack IPS LCD	10	0.9
Polaroid Advance 5	September 2014	1.2	1	16	5.0	ClearBlack IPS LCD	10	0.9
Prestigio MultiPhone 8500 DUO	July 2014	Snapdragon 200 (1.2)	1	8	5.0	IPS LCD	8	2
Q-Smart Dream W473	August 2014	Snapdragon 200 (1.2)	1	4	4.7	IPS LCD	8	2
Q-Smart Storm W610	August 2014	Snapdragon 200 (1.2)	1	8	6.0	IPS LCD	8	2
Ramos Q7	May 2015	Snapdragon 200 (1.2)	1	16	7.0	IPS LCD	5	2
TrekStor WinPhone 4.7 HD	March 2015	Snapdragon 200 (1.2)	1	8	4.7	IPS LCD	8	2
Xolo Win Q1000	February 2015	Snapdragon 200 (1.2)	1	8	5	IPS LCD	8	2
Xolo Win Q900s	July 2014	Snapdragon 200 (1.2)	1	8	4.7	IPS LCD	8	2
Yezz Billy 4.7	October 2014	Snapdragon 200 (1.2)	1	8	4.7	IPS LCD	8	2
Yezz Billy 5s LTE	June 2015	Snapdragon 400/410 (1.2)	1	8	5	IPS LCD	13	5
Yezz Monaco 47	December 2014	Snapdragon 200 (1.2)	1	8	4.7	IPS LCD	13.1	5

=== Quad-core 1080p ===
These devices feature quad core processors and 1080p screens at 1080x1920 resolution. The Nokia Lumia 930 lacks a microSD card reader and uses a Snapdragon 800 chipset, while the HTC One (M8) with Windows Phone features a card reader and uses a Snapdragon 801 chipset.

Product	Release date	CPU (GHz)	RAM (GB)	Storage (GB)	Display		Camera (MP)	
Product	Release date	CPU (GHz)	RAM (GB)	Storage (GB)	Size (″)	Type	Rear	Front
HTC One (M8)	August 2014	Snapdragon 801 (2.3)	2	32	5.0	S-LCD 3	4	5
Nokia Lumia 930	July 2014	Snapdragon 800 (2.2)	2	32	5.0	ClearBlack AMOLED	20	1.2

== See also ==
- Windows Phone version history
- Windows Phone 8.1
- List of Windows Phone 8 devices
- List of Windows 10 Mobile devices
