= Nokia Lumia 1320 =

Phablet Windows Smartphone designed and built by Microsoft Mobile

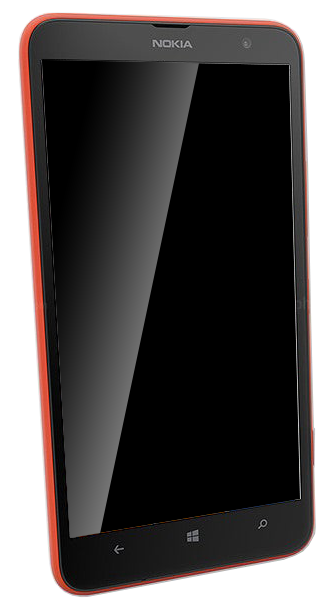
- Manufacturer: Nokia
- Type: Smartphone
- Series: Lumia
- First released: October 2013
- Availability by region: January 2014
- Discontinued: April 2015
- Successor: Microsoft Lumia 640 XL
- Related: Nokia Lumia 1520
- Compatible networks: GSM/GPRS/EDGE; HSPA+ 4G LTE Rel. 8 (UE Cat 3); Wi-Fi
- Form factor: Touchscreen Phablet
- Dimensions: 164.25 mm (6.467 in) H 85.9 mm (3.38 in) W 9.79 mm (0.385 in) D
- Weight: 220 g (7.8 oz)
- Operating system: Windows Phone 8, upgradeable to Windows Phone 8.1.
- System-on-chip: Qualcomm Snapdragon S4
- CPU: 1.7 GHz dual-core Qualcomm
- GPU: Qualcomm Adreno 305
- Memory: 1 GB RAM
- Storage: 8 GB flash
- Removable storage: MicroSD (up to 128 GB)
- Battery: BV-4BW 3400 mAh
- Rear camera: 5 megapixels 1080p Full HD video capture @ 30fps, Touch to focus, Face recognition, Digital zoom, Geo tagging, LED flash
- Front camera: 0.3 megapixels, VGA video capture @ 30fps
- Display: 6" HD LCD IPS ClearBlack Touchscreen; 1280x720 px
- Connectivity: List: Wi-Fi :802.11 b/g/n; Wi-Fi-based positioning system (WPS); GPS/GLONASS; SA-GPS; NFC; Bluetooth 4.0; Micro-USB 2.0
- Data inputs: Multi-touch capacitive touchscreen, Magnetometer, proximity sensor, 3D-Accelerometer, Ambient light
- Other: Talk time: Up to 25 hours Standby time: Up to 672 hours (28 days)
- Website: Nokia Lumia 1320

The Nokia Lumia 1320 smartphone is a phablet smartphone in the Lumia series developed by Nokia that runs the Windows Phone 8, now Windows Phone 8.1 operating system. It was announced at the Nokia World event on October 22, 2013. It was released in Asia in the first quarter of 2014, including the India release in January 2014. It has 6-inch (150 mm) ClearBlack IPS LCD, making it the biggest display for Windows phones along with the Nokia Lumia 1520.

It was discontinued with the introduction of the Microsoft Lumia 640 XL, its successor, in April 2015.

== Model variants ==
Model	RM-994	RM-995	RM-996
Countries	International	United States	China mainland
Carriers/providers	International	TBA	China Unicom
2G	Quad-band GSM/EDGE (850/900/1800/1900 MHz)		
3G	Triband HSPA+ 1, 5/6, 8 (850/900/2100 MHz)	Quadband HSPA+ 2, 4, 5/6 (850/AWS/1900/2100 MHz)	Dualband HSPA+ 1, 8 (900/2100 MHz)
4G	Triband LTE 3, 7, 20 (800/1800/2600 MHz)	Quadband LTE 2, 4, 5, 17 (700/850/1700/1900 MHz)	N/A
Max network speed down/upload	LTE: 100/50 Mbit/s; DC-HSPA+: 42.2/5.76 Mbit/s		HSPA+: 21/5.76 Mbit/s

== See also ==
- Microsoft Lumia
- Microsoft Lumia 640 XL
