= Samsung Ativ Odyssey =

Smartphone

- Manufacturer: Samsung Electronics
- Type: Smartphone
- Series: ATIV
- First released: 2013
- Predecessor: Samsung Focus S Samsung Omnia W
- Dimensions: 121.92×63.5×10.16 mm (4.800×2.500×0.400 in)
- Weight: 4.4 oz (125 g)
- Operating system: Windows Phone 8
- System-on-chip: Qualcomm
- CPU: 1.5ghz Snapdragon S4
- Memory: 8GB internal storage 1GB RAM
- Removable storage: microSD up to 64GB
- Battery: 2100mah
- Rear camera: 5mp
- Front camera: 1.2mp
- Display: 4.0inch 480x800 WVGA

The ATIV Odyssey is a mid-range smartphone manufactured by Samsung. Like all products under the Ativ brand, the Odyssey is a Microsoft Windows-based device. It specifically shipped with the Windows Phone 8 operating system. It was offered through Verizon Wireless and US Cellular. The device was sold by Verizon for $9.99 with a two-year contract.

The Samsung Ativ Odyssey was first released in January 2013. It has a 4-inch Super AMOLED display and runs on a Qualcomm MSM8960 Snapdragon S4 Plus chipset. The standby battery can last up to 168 hours, and the talk time can last up to 19 hours. The camera has 5 MP, autofocus, and LED flash. It also features geo-tagging.

After the product's release, the reception was mixed. Brian Bennett from CNET described it as: "Windows Phone 8 at a low price, but not much else". On the other hand, there are reviews that claimed it is a budget device that performs like a flagship phone.
