= HP Elite x3 =

Smartphone model

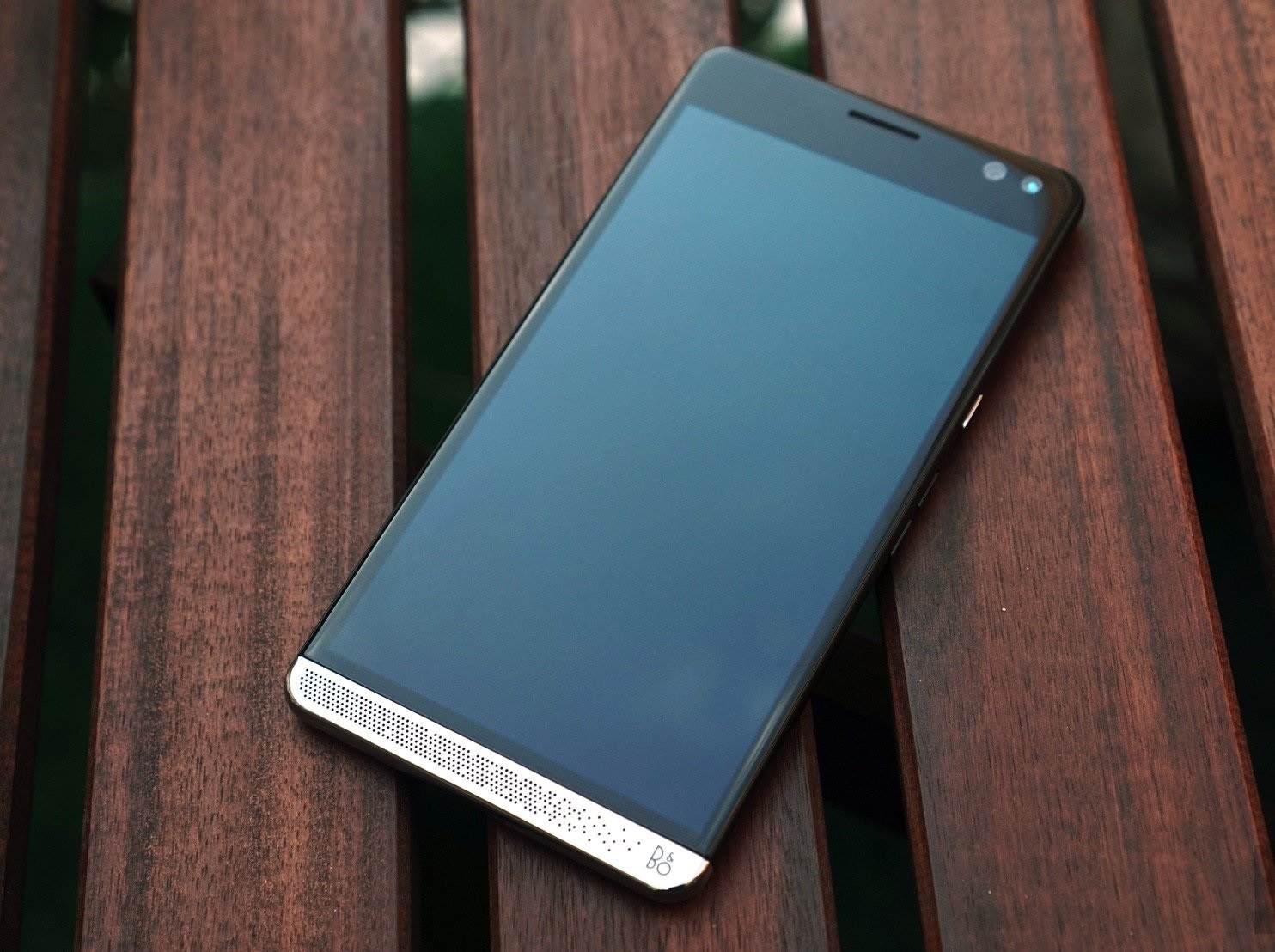
- Brand: HP Inc.
- Type: Smartphone
- First released: October 2016
- Availability by region: October 2016
- Compatible networks: GSM, LTE
- Form factor: Slate
- Dimensions: 161.5 mm (6.36 in) H 83.6 mm (3.29 in) W 7.9 mm (0.31 in) D
- Weight: 195 g (6.88 oz)
- Operating system: Windows 10 Mobile
- System-on-chip: Qualcomm Snapdragon 820 (MSM8996)
- GPU: Adreno 530
- Memory: 4 GB LPDDR4 RAM
- Storage: 64 GB eMMC
- Removable storage: microSD up to 2 TB
- Battery: 4,150 mAh Li-Ion battery Qi/PMA wireless charging
- Rear camera: 16 MP, 4K
- Front camera: 8 MP, 1080p
- Display: 5.96 in (151 mm) WQHD (2560 x 1440) AMOLED, 494 ppi, Gorilla Glass 4
- Data inputs: Multi-touch capacitive touchscreen
- Other: Iris scanner and fingerprint scanner for Windows Hello; Continuum for Phone via HP Desk Dock and Lap Dock IP67, MIL-STD 810G
- Website: store.hp.com/us/en/pdp/hp-elite-x3-and-hp-elite-x3-desk-dock

HP Elite x3 is a premium Windows 10 Mobile smartphone produced by Hewlett-Packard. It was officially announced on 21 February 2016, and released later that year.

== Specifications ==
The HP Elite x3 was built for enterprise users with several enterprise specific features such as high-end processing power (Qualcomm Snapdragon 820), large and bright display (Samsung 5.96" WQHD AMOLED), IP67, MIL-STD 810G, Dual biometric authentication with Iris and fingerprint scanner, 2x2 MIMO 802.11ac, Cat 6 LTE, Bang & Olufsen sound, USB-C charging with a 4,150mAh battery and Qi/PMA wireless charging.

=== Continuum ===
Setting it apart from other premium smartphones, HP Elite x3's defining feature is its ability to connect to an external monitor, keyboard and mouse via the HP Desk Dock, providing a desktop PC-like environment, powered by Microsoft's Continuum feature on Windows 10 Mobile. HP also offers the HP Lap Dock, which is a laptop shell that does not have any computing power in itself (i.e. no CPU, no Motherboard, no HDD, etc.), but connects to the Elite x3 via wired (USB-C) or wireless (802.11ac) connection and powers the Lap Dock, which is essentially a display terminal with a keyboard, touchpad, battery and I/O ports in a laptop form factor.

== Reception ==
Debuting at Mobile World Congress 2016, the HP Elite x3 garnered over 30 "Best of MWC" awards. However, despite some positive reviews by critics, sales have been less than expected due to diminishing market position of Windows 10 Mobile as a viable Mobile OS platform. While HP's sales and marketing have been focused on targeting enterprise customers, consumers are able to purchase the Elite x3 and the Desk Dock and Lap Dock at hp.com website as well as in Microsoft Stores, both offline and online.

== Model variants ==
There is an EMEA+APJ model, an Americas model, and an Americas model connected by Verizon (US only).
