= BLU Products =

American mobile phone rebrander

- Industry: Consumer electronics
- Founded: August 4, 2009; 17 years ago
- Founder: Samuel Ohev-Zion
- Headquarters: Doral, Florida, United States
- Area served: Worldwide
- Key people: Samuel Ohev-Zion (CEO)
- Products: Mobile phones
- Website: bluproducts.com

BLU Products (stylized as BLÜ) is an American company, headquartered in Miami. The name BLU stands for Bold Like Us. BLU has rebranded low-cost mobile phones manufactured by Chinese original design manufacturers such as Koobee and Gionee.

== History ==
BLU Products, founded by Samuel Ohev-Zion, was the fastest-growing mobile phone provider in the region, announcing its presence at CTIA Wireless 2011.

BLU products are present throughout Latin America, Central America, the United States, and all of the Caribbean. BLU sold 70,000 units in its first year in 2009, and rapidly became the leading mobile device brand in Latin America, selling 4.1 million units the following year. In Aruba, Digicel introduced in September 2013 a low-cost BLU Android cellphone for the local market, selling for Afl.9 (approximately US$6) with a post-paid plan.

In August 2016, BlackBerry Limited filed a lawsuit against BLU for allegedly infringing 15 patents with its user interface design.

In May 2017, BLU became the official shirt sponsor of Spanish football club Valencia CF.

=== Privacy data collection ===
In November 2016, security firm Kryptowire detected pre-loaded remote surveillance software on BLU phones sold online through Amazon and Best Buy. In August 2017, Amazon pulled BLU Products from its website over security vulnerabilities that resulted in BLU consumer user data being covertly sent to China. One month later, Amazon reinstated sales of BLU devices on their website. CNET reported, "[Shanghai Adups Technology] Having access to the command and control channel -- a communications route between your device and a server -- allowed Adups to execute commands as if it's the user, meaning it could also install apps, take screenshots, record the screen, make calls and wipe devices without needing permission." Even after Adups publicly reported the spyware to be a mistake, kryptowire discovered that the same vulnerability was still being utilized, except in a more covert manner, which was seen as part of a state-sponsored intelligence gathering campaign.

The Federal Trade Commission (FTC) subsequently investigated the widely reported consumer privacy exploitation that was attributed to BLU. The FTC complaint charged that the "company and its co-owner and President Samuel Ohev-Zion misled consumers by falsely claiming that third parties were only collecting information from Blu user devices required to perform their requested services, and no more". In April 2018, the FTC disclosed that their agency had reached a settlement with BLU where it alleged that "BLU misled consumers and put their personal data at risk." A few months later, the FTC officially concluded that BLU "deceived consumers about the disclosure of their personal information" and believed BLU "violated the Federal Trade Commission Act." In September 2018, BLU was ordered to be legally bound to specific stipulations to settle their legal misconduct. The settlement with the FTC "prohibited [BLU] from misrepresenting the extent to which they protect the privacy and security of personal information". The FTC required BLU's security practices to be thoroughly and regularly analyzed for the following 20 years by an independent 3rd party security monitoring entity, and mandated that BLU develop and maintain a "comprehensive security program" designed for both "new and existing" BLU devices.

Due to the hidden spyware, reviewers have advised against BLU phones despite their low prices.
