= Windows Phone 8.1 =

Third generation of Microsoft's Windows Phone mobile operating system

- Version of the Windows Phone operating system

- A customized Windows Phone 8.1 start screen
- Developer: Microsoft Mobile
- Working state: Discontinued
- Source model: Closed-source
- Released to manufacturing: April 14, 2014; 12 years ago
- General availability: August 4, 2014; 12 years ago
- Final release: Update 2 (8.10.15148.160) / June 2, 2015; 11 years ago
- Final preview: 8.10.15116.125 / April 10, 2015; 11 years ago
- Update method: Firmware over the air and via Windows Phone Store
- Package manager: XAP, APPX
- Supported platforms: 32-bit ARM architecture
- Kernel type: Hybrid (NT kernel)
- License: Proprietary software licensed to OEMs
- Preceded by: Windows Phone 8 (2012)
- Succeeded by: Windows 10 Mobile (2015)
- Official website: Archived official website at the Wayback Machine (archive index)

Support status
- Unsupported as of July 11, 2017

Windows Phone 8.1 is the third generation of Microsoft Mobile's Windows Phone mobile operating system, succeeding Windows Phone 8. Rolled out at Microsoft's Build Conference in San Francisco, California on April 2, 2014, it was released in final form to Windows Phone developers on April 14, 2014 and reached general availability on August 4, 2014. All Windows Phones running Windows Phone 8 can be upgraded to Windows Phone 8.1, with release dependent on carrier rollout dates.

Windows Phone 8.1 is also the last version that uses the Windows Phone brand name as it was succeeded by Windows 10 Mobile. Some Windows Phone 8.1 devices are capable of being upgraded to Windows 10 Mobile. Microsoft delayed the upgrade and reduced the supported device list from their initial promise. Support ended for Windows Phone 8.1 on July 11, 2017.

== History ==
Windows Phone 8.1 was first rumored to be Windows Phone Blue, a series of updates to Microsoft's mobile operating system that would coincide with the release of Windows 8.1. Although Microsoft had originally planned to release WP8.1 in late 2013, shortly after the release of its PC counterpart, general distribution of the new operating system was pushed back until early 2014.

Instead of waiting over a year to add new features to Windows Phone 8, Microsoft opted to release three incremental updates to its existing mobile OS. These updates are delivered with corresponding firmware updates for the specific devices. The updates included GDR2 (Lumia Amber), which introduced features such as "Data Sense", and GDR3 (Lumia Black), which brought support for quad-core processors, 1080p high-definition screens of up to six inches, the addition of a "Driving Mode," and extra rows of live tiles for larger "phablet" devices.

The updated operating system's final name was leaked to the public when Microsoft released the Windows Phone 8.1 SDK to developers on February 10, 2014, but it wasn't until Microsoft's Build conference keynote on April 2, 2014 when Windows Phone 8.1 was officially announced, alongside the Windows 8.1 Update. The final shipping code was released to registered users of the "Preview for Developers" program on April 14, 2014, and to the general public in subsequent months, the actual release date being determined by the devices' wireless carriers and accompanied with firmware updates, including Lumia Cyan.

=== Preview for Developers ===
The "Preview for Developers" program was initiated in October 2013 with the release of Windows Phone 8 Update 3. The program was intended for developers and enthusiasts to gain immediate access to OS updates as they become available from Microsoft, bypassing wireless carriers and OEMs who test changes before including device-specific firmware updates. Users of the "Preview for Developers" program do not void their warranty in most cases and can install any future firmware that is included with their carrier's official rollout of Windows Phone 8.1.

The Windows Phone software updates delivered through "Preview for Developers" are complete, finished versions of the OS, as opposed to the Windows 10 Mobile builds in the Windows Insider program, which are preview versions of the software that are intended for users to try out new features before the final release and may contain bugs.

== Features ==
Windows Phone 8.1 introduces a host of notable new features, most of which were unveiled in a preview released to developers on February 10, 2014.

=== Cortana ===
Cortana on Windows Phone 8.1

Cortana is a personal virtual assistant that was added in Windows Phone 8.1, and is similar to Google Now and Apple's Siri. The Cortana name derives from the Halo video game series, which is a Microsoft franchise exclusive to Xbox and Windows. Cortana's features include being able to set reminders, recognize natural voice without the user having to input a predefined series of commands and answer questions using information from Bing (like current weather and traffic conditions, sports scores, and biographies).

Cortana also uses a special feature called a "Notebook", where it will automatically gather information about and interests of the user based on usage and allow the user to input additional personal information, such as quiet hours and close friends who are allowed to get through to the user during these quiet hours. Users can also delete information from the "Notebook" if they deem it undesirable for Cortana to know.

Windows 8.1's universal Bing SmartSearch features are incorporated into Cortana, which replaces the previous Bing Search app which is activated when a user presses the "Search" button on their device.

This feature, which is currently in beta, was released in the United States in the first half of 2014 and in China, the United Kingdom, India, Canada and Australia in August 2014. Microsoft has committed to updating Cortana twice a month and add features. The new features may include more "easter egg" replies, improvements in UI and better voice modulations.

=== Web ===
Windows Phone 8.1 uses a mobile version of Internet Explorer 11 as the default web browser. IE11 carries over many of its desktop counterpart's improvements, which include support for WebGL, normal mapping, InPrivate mode, Reading mode, and the ability to swipe left or right to navigate to a previous webpage and back. The updated browser also includes a new HTML video web player with support for inline playback and closed captions, Windows 8-style website live tiles, and the ability to save passwords. Furthermore, users can now open an unlimited number of tabs, instead of the previous maximum of 6.

If a user is logged in with their Microsoft account on both their Windows 8.1 device and Windows Phone, their tabs on IE11 will now sync automatically.

=== Apps and Windows Phone Store ===
==== App framework ====
Apps for Windows Phone 8.1 can now be created using the same application model as Windows Store apps for Windows 8.1, based on the Windows Runtime, and the file extension for WP apps is now ".appx" (which is used for Windows Store apps), instead of Windows Phone's traditional ".xap" file format. Applications built for WP8.1 can invoke semantic zoom, as well as access to single sign-on with a Microsoft account. The Windows Phone Store now also updates apps automatically. The store can be manually checked for updates available for applications on a device. It also adds the option to update applications when on Wi-Fi only.

App developers will be able to develop apps using C# / Visual Basic.NET (.NET), C++ (CX) or HTML with JavaScript, like for Windows 8.

Developers will also be able to build "universal apps" for both Windows Phone 8.1 and Windows 8 that share almost all code, except for that specific to the platform, such as user interface and phone APIs.

Any universal apps that have been installed on Windows 8.1 will automatically appear in the user's "My Apps" section on Windows Phone 8.1.

Apps built for Windows Phone 8 and Windows Phone 7 automatically run on Windows Phone 8.1, but apps built for Windows Phone 8.1 will not run on any previous version of Windows Phone.

==== Windows Phone Store ====
The Windows Phone Store was redesigned in Windows Phone 8.1 to become more information-dense. App collections, which were previously visible in a different page, are now fully featured on the front column of the Store. There is also no more distinction between Games and other apps; both now show up in the app list, although categories for apps and games (such as "most popular games" or "most popular apps") are still separated. App ratings have been designed to match those of Windows 8.1, with horizontal bars added to indicate how many 5-star, 4-star, or 3-star reviews an app has received. App screenshots now no longer have their own page, but can instead can be viewed at the bottom of the app description page. Furthermore, the Windows Phone Store now includes a "My Apps" section under the three-dot menu which allows users to re-install any app they have purchased previously.

Windows Phone 8.1 support ended on July 11, 2017. The Windows Phone Store on Windows Phone 8.1 was shut down on December 16, 2019.

==== New and revamped apps ====
Battery Saver added the ability to track battery usage and determine profiles that will lower power consumption. In addition, the "Background Tasks" page, which allows a user to stop or allow an individual app from running in the background, has been moved from the Settings menu to Battery Saver. In addition to just being able to stop a background task from running, users can now set profiles which will prevent certain apps from running only if the battery level is below a designated percentage.

Storage Sense consolidates storage management tools such as moving data between internal and external storage, and clearing temporary files. Wi-Fi Sense automatically signs devices into trusted available Wi-Fi hotspots, and allows users to securely share login credentials for personal Wi-Fi networks to their contacts without disclosing the password.

The Calendar app now has a week view with current weather, similar to the features in the Microsoft Outlook on PC, as well as further Google Calendar sync support.

Maps has been overhauled with support for aerial-view, 3D mapping and a dynamic compass. Local Scout, which has been removed from Windows Phone 8.1 in the United States due to the implementation of Cortana, has been moved to Maps. The map also shows nearby Wi-Fi hotspots.

==== Calling and Skype ====
The Dialer app adds a "Speed Dial" page, and calls from a single caller in Call History are now grouped. Clicking on the group will reveal individual call details such as the time and date the call was made. A button has been added next to each caller which allows unidentified callers to be added to a user's contact list or brings up information on an existing contact.

Users can now automatically upgrade existing phone calls to Skype video calls from within the phone call UI, which has also been revamped with larger buttons. In addition to a large photo of the contact, text with the user's name and phone number now appear at the top of the screen instead of directly above the dialer. Skype calls can also be directly initiated from Cortana.

==== Multimedia ====
Xbox Music and Xbox Video provide streaming services for movies, music, and TV shows, and are separated as opposed to being joined together in previous versions. Notably, Xbox Video now has built-in support for video streaming. In addition to separating its music and video streaming services, 8.1 also adds support for separate volume controls, audio and video transcoding, hardware acceleration, stereoscopic 3D, and the ability for apps to capture and record video independently of the operating system's built-in video recorder. Furthermore, built-in support for streaming through DLNA to monitors and television screens, referred to by Microsoft as PlayTo, is also included, as well as the ability to mirror display from a phone to a separate screen. Media editing tools have also been refined: apps for slow motion video capture, video effects, and audio effects have been added. Microsoft currently provides bi-weekly updates i.e. twice a month, to both of these apps. In August 2014, A2DP and AVRCP support was also added.

The camera app has been updated with a more minimalist design similar to that of the camera app on Windows 8.1. Additionally, users can now save high-resolution photos directly to OneDrive, instead of only having the option to upload the 5MP version of the image to the cloud.

=== Multitasking ===
Building on improvements made in the third update to its predecessor, Windows Phone 8.1 adds support for closing apps by swiping down on them in the multitasking view (invoked by doing a long-press on the "back" button), which is similar to how multitasking operates on Windows 8 and iOS. Pressing the back button now suspends an app in the multitasking view instead of closing it.

=== Live tiles ===
A third column of live tiles, which was previously available only to Windows Phones with 1080p and select phones with 720p screens, is now an option for all Windows Phone 8.1 devices regardless of screen size. Microsoft has also added the ability for users to skin live tiles with a background image.

With the inclusion of Update 1, WP8.1 now lets users drag app tiles on top of each other to create folders of apps on the Start Screen. Each individual app within the folder can still appear as a Live Tile, and opening the folder simply expands it on the Start Screen so the user can rearrange and open apps.

=== Social ===
The "Me" hub in Windows Phone 8.1 has been transformed from a single hub to update and maintain all social media accounts to a single hub to a viewer which allows users to view news feeds from social networks. When users click on a Facebook post, for example, they are instantly redirected to the Facebook app, instead of being allowed to like or comment on that post in the "Me" hub itself, a feature available in previous versions of Windows Phone. The Me hub's notification center for social networks has also been removed, as this feature is now integrated into Windows Phone 8.1's Action Center. Supported social networks in the "Me" hub include Facebook, Foursquare, LinkedIn, and Twitter, which has also been fully integrated into the Contacts Hub.

"Threads," which allowed users to seamlessly switch between different chat services, have also been removed from the Messaging app, which is now solely for text messages. Other changes to the messaging app include the ability to select multiple text messages for forwarding or deletion.

=== Lockscreen ===
Windows Phone 8.1 adds the ability for OEMs and individual apps to customize their custom lock screen themes even further by skinning the font and orientation of time, date, and notification text.

=== Notifications and settings ===
Windows Phone 8.1's Action Center

A new notifications center known as "Action Center" has been added, and allows for the ability to change simple settings such as volume controls. The new notifications area's design allows the user to for example change wireless networks, turn Bluetooth and Airplane Mode on or off, and access "Driving Mode" from four customisable boxes at the top of the screen, while beneath these four horizontally placed boxes include recent text messages and social integration.

Apps can also send users location-specific notifications with the addition of a new geofencing API.

=== Keyboard ===
Microsoft has added a Word Flow keyboard in Windows Phone 8.1 that, similarly to the Swype keyboard option available on Android devices, allows users to swipe through letters to type. As the user swipes, the keyboard generates space automatically for the next word to be entered.

The keyboard was touted for its speed and accuracy, and brought fame to Microsoft's research division when fifteen-year-old Lakeside School student Gaurav Sharma, using a Nokia Lumia 520 equipped with Windows Phone 8.1 and the "Word Flow" keyboard, broke the Guinness World Record for the world's fastest typing on a mobile phone, which was previously held by a Samsung Galaxy S4 user, by eight seconds. This record was short-lived, which was subsequently beaten a month later by Marcel Fernandes, who finished a quarter of a second faster using the Fleksy Keyboard, a competing keyboard available on iOS and Android. However, as Flesky relies on predictive text algorithms rather than swiping gestures, it is fair to say that "Word Flow" remains the world's fastest "swipe" keyboard on a mobile phone.

=== File system ===
Windows Phone 8.1 allows apps to view all files stored on a WP device and move, copy, paste and share the contents of a device's internal file system. As a result of this change, multiple file explorer apps have been released on the Windows Phone Store since the operating system's debut. Microsoft released its own file explorer app on May 30, 2014.

In addition to these changes, SkyDrive has been completely rebranded to OneDrive across the operating system after Microsoft's settlement of a dispute over the "Sky" trademark with Sky. Users are also presented with multiple options when a Windows Phone 8.1 device is connected to a computer via USB.

=== Enterprise improvements ===
Windows Phone 8.1 adds support for VPN and Bluetooth 4.0 LE. With the release of Update 1, receiving or sending data through VPN when connecting to a Wi-Fi network and the Bluetooth PAN (Personal Area Network) 1.0 standard are also supported.

Apps Corner is a kiosk mode that allows users to restrict usage to a select group of applications and boot straight into a specific app.

== Hardware ==
=== Devices ===
Windows Phone 8.1 devices were manufactured by Microsoft Mobile (formerly Nokia) and its hardware partners, including HTC, Gionee, JSR, Karbonn, Micromax, Samsung, Alcatel, Lava (under both the Lava and Xolo brands), Cherry Mobile, and Blu. Additionally, Gionee, JSR, LG, Lenovo, Longcheer, and ZTE registered as Windows Phone hardware partners and were set to release Windows Phone products. Sony (under the Xperia or Vaio brand) also stated its intention to produce Windows Phone devices in the near future, but this has not materialized. During Build 2014, Microsoft announced two additional hardware partners, Micromax and Prestigio.

=== Hardware requirements ===
Windows Phone 8.1 loosened some of the platform's hardware requirements to enable more flexibility for hardware partners, such as the ability to adapt existing Android devices (including, in particular, high-end flagships such as the HTC One M8) to run Windows Phone instead. Among these changes are support for virtual navigation keys similar to Android, which can be hidden by swiping them to the side of the screen.

Windows Phone 8.1 minimum device requirements
Qualcomm Snapdragon S4, Snapdragon 200, Snapdragon 400, or Snapdragon 800 multi-core processor
Minimum 512 MB RAM for WVGA phones; minimum 1 GB RAM for 720p / WXGA / 1080p
Minimum 4 GB flash memory
GPS and A-GNSS; GLONASS is supported if OEMs decide to include it
Support for micro-USB 2.0
3.5 mm stereo headphone jack with three-button detection support
Rear-facing AF camera with optional LED or Xenon flash, optional front-facing camera (both need to be VGA or better)
Accelerometer, proximity sensors, as well as vibration motor (magnetometer, gyroscope and ambient light sensors are optional)
802.11b/g and Bluetooth (802.11n is optional)
DirectX graphics hardware support with hardware acceleration for Direct3D using programmable GPU
Multi-touch capacitive touch screen with minimum of four simultaneous points

== Reception ==
Tom Warren of The Verge said that it is clear that the Windows Phone platform is being left behind by its competitors. Although the Windows Phone store has many apps, there are still less than the Android and iOS stores, and the Windows Phone apps equivalents are severely lacking. However, he commends Windows Phone for its ability to run smoothly across a wide variety of hardware and the thoughtful addition of features.
