= Windows Phone 8 =

Second generation of Microsoft's Windows Phone mobile operating system

- Version of the Windows Phone operating system

- Start screen
- Developer: Microsoft Corporation
- OS family: Windows 8
- Working state: Discontinued
- Source model: Closed-source
- General availability: October 29, 2012; 14 years ago
- Final release: Update 3 (Build 8.0.10532.166) / April 14, 2014; 12 years ago
- Update method: Firmware over the air
- Package manager: XAP, APPX
- Supported platforms: 32-bit ARM architecture
- Kernel type: Hybrid (NT kernel)
- License: Proprietary software licensed to OEMs
- Preceded by: Windows Phone 7 (2010)
- Succeeded by: Windows Phone 8.1 (2014)
- Official website: Archived official website at the Wayback Machine (archive index)

Support status
- Unsupported as of January 12, 2016

Windows Phone 8 is the second generation of the Windows Phone mobile operating system from Microsoft, released on October 29, 2012. It runs on the Windows NT kernel and is the successor to Windows Phone 7. It was the first Windows platform for mobile devices to be closely related to, and match the version number, of a desktop counterpart, in this case Windows 8.

Like its predecessor, it features a flat user interface based on the Metro design language. Windows Phone 8 replaced the Windows CE kernel used in Windows Phone 7.x with the Windows NT kernel found in Windows 8. As a consequence of this, all Windows Phone 7.x devices cannot run or update to Windows Phone 8, and new applications compiled specifically for Windows Phone 8 are not made available for Windows Phone 7.x devices. Windows Phone 8 devices were manufactured by Nokia, HTC, Samsung and Huawei.

Windows Phone 8 was succeeded by Windows Phone 8.1, which was unveiled on April 2, 2014. Support for Windows Phone 8 ended in January 2016.

== History ==
On June 20, 2012, Microsoft unveiled Windows Phone 8 (codenamed Apollo), a third generation of the Windows Phone operating system for release later in 2012. Windows Phone 8 replaces its previously Windows CE kernel with one based on the Windows NT kernel, and shares many components with Windows 8, allowing developers to easily port applications between the two platforms.

Windows Phone 8 also allows devices with larger screens (the four confirmed sizes are "WVGA 800×480 15:9","WXGA 1280×768 15:9","720p 1280×720 16:9","1080p 1920x1080 16:9" resolutions) and multi-core processors, NFC (that can primarily be used to share content and perform payments), backwards compatibility with Windows Phone 7 apps, improved support for removable storage (that now functions more similarly to how such storage is handled on Windows and Android), a redesigned home screen incorporating resizable tiles across the entire screen, a new Wallet hub (to integrate NFC payments, coupon websites such as Groupon, and loyalty cards), and "first-class" integration of VoIP applications into the core functions of the OS. Additionally, Windows Phone 8 includes more features aimed at the enterprise market, such as device management, BitLocker encryption, and the ability to create a private Marketplace to distribute apps to employees—features meeting or exceeding the enterprise capabilities of the previous Windows Mobile platform. Additionally, Windows Phone 8 supports over-the-air updates, and all Windows Phone 8 devices received software support for at least 36 months after their release.

Developers could make their apps available on both Windows Phone 7 and Windows Phone 8 devices by targeting both platforms via the proper SDKs in Visual Studio.

In the interest of ensuring it is released with devices designed to take advantage of its new features, Windows Phone 8 was not made available as an update for existing Windows Phone 7 devices. Instead, Microsoft released Windows Phone 7.8 as an update for Windows Phone 7 devices, which backported several features such as the redesigned home screen.

Addressing some software bugs with Windows Phone 8 forced Microsoft to delay some enterprise improvements, like VPN support, until the 2014 release of Windows Phone 8.1.

=== Support ===
In March 2013, Microsoft announced that updates for the Windows Phone 8 operating system would be made available through July 8, 2014. Microsoft pushed support up to 36 months, announcing that updates for the Windows Phone 8 operating system would be made available through January 12, 2016. Windows Phone 8 devices will be upgradeable to the next edition of Windows Phone 8.1.

== Features ==
The following features were confirmed at Microsoft's 'sneak peek' at Windows Phone on June 20, 2012 and the unveiling of Windows Phone 8 on October 29, 2012:

=== Core ===
Windows Phone 8 is the first mobile OS from Microsoft to use the Windows NT kernel, which is the same kernel (NT kernel 6.2) that runs Windows 8. The operating system adds improved file system, drivers, network stack, security components, media and graphics support. Using the NT kernel, Windows Phone can now support multi-core CPUs of up to 64 cores, as well as 1280×720 and 1280×768 resolutions, in addition to the base 800×480 resolution already available on Windows Phone 7. Furthermore, Windows Phone 8 also adds support for MicroSD cards, which are commonly used to add extra storage to phones. Support for 1080p screens was added in October 2013 with the GDR3 update.

Due to the switch to the NT kernel, Windows Phone 8 also supports native 128-bit Bitlocker encryption and Secure Boot. Windows Phone 8 also supports NTFS due to this switch. The UEFI with ACPI protocol was adopted as boot loader of Windows Phone 8, as part of its board support package.

=== Web ===
Internet Explorer 10 is the default browser in Windows Phone 8 and carries over key improvements also found in the desktop version. The navigation interface has been simplified down to a single customizable button (defaults to stop / refresh) and the address bar. While users can change the button to a 'Back' button, there is no way to add a 'Forward' button. However, as the browser supports swipe navigation for both forwards and back, this is a minor issue.

=== Multitasking ===
Unlike its predecessor, Windows Phone 8 uses true multitasking, allowing developers to create apps that can run in the background and resume instantly.

A user can switch between "active" tasks by pressing and holding the Back button, but any application listed may be suspended or terminated under certain conditions, such as a network connection being established or battery power running low. An app running in the background may also automatically suspend, if the user has not opened it for a long duration of time.

The user can close applications by opening the multitasking view and pressing the "X" button in the right-hand corner of each application window, a feature that was added in Update 3.

=== Kids Corner ===
Windows Phone 8 adds Kids Corner, which operates as a kind of guest mode. The user chooses which applications and games appear on the Kids Corner. When Kids Corner is activated, apps and games installed on the device can be played or accessed without touching the data of the main user signed into the Windows Phone.

=== Rooms ===
Rooms is a feature added specifically for group messaging and communication. Using Rooms, users can contact and see Facebook and Twitter updates only from members of the group created. Members of the group can also share instant messages and photos from within the room. These messages will be shared only with the other room members. Microsoft removed this feature in March 2015.

=== Driving Mode ===
With the release of Update 3 in late 2013, pairing a Windows Phone 8 device with a car via Bluetooth now automatically activates "Driving Mode", a specialized UI designed for using a mobile device while driving.

=== Data Sense ===
Data Sense allows users to set data usage limits based on their individual plan. Data Sense can restrict background data when the user is near their set limit (a heart icon is used to notify the user when background tasks are being automatically stopped). Although this feature was originally exclusive to Verizon phones in the United States, the GDR2 update released in July 2013 made Data Sense available to all Windows Phone 8 handsets.

=== NFC and Wallet ===
Select Windows Phones running Windows Phone 8 add NFC capability, which allows for data transfer between two Windows Phone devices, or between a Windows Phone device, and a Windows 8 computer or tablet, using a feature called "Tap and Send".

In certain markets, NFC support on Windows Phone 8 can also be used to conduct in-person transactions through credit and debit cards stored on the phone through the Wallet application. Carriers may activate the NFC feature through SIM or integrated phone hardware. Orange will be first carrier to support NFC on Windows Phone 8. Besides NFC support for transactions, Wallet can also be used to store credit cards in order to make Windows Phone Store and other in-app purchases (that is also a new feature), and can be used to store coupons and loyalty cards.

=== Syncing ===
The Windows Phone app succeeds the Zune Software as the sync application to transfer music, videos, other multimedia files and office documents between Windows Phone 8 and a Windows 8/Windows RT computer or tablet. Versions for OS X and Windows Desktop are also available. Windows Phone 7 devices are not compatible with the PC version of the app, but will work with the Mac version. (Zune is still used for syncing Windows Phone 7s with PCs, and thus remains downloadable from the Windows Phone website.)

Due to Windows Phone 8 identifying itself as an MTP device, Windows Media Player and Windows Explorer may be used to transfer music, videos and other multimedia files unlike in Windows Phone 7. Videos transferred to a computer are limited to a maximum size of 4 GB.

=== Other features ===
- Xbox SmartGlass allows control of an Xbox 360 and Xbox One with a phone (available for Windows Phone, iOS and Android).
- Xbox Music+Video services support playback of audio and video files in Windows Phone, as well as music purchases. Video purchases were made available with the release of a standalone version of Xbox Video in late 2013 that can be downloaded from the Windows Phone Store.
- Native code support (C++)
- Toast notifications sent by apps and app developers using the Microsoft Push Notification Service.
- Simplified porting of Windows 8 apps to Windows Phone 8 (compatibility with Windows 8 "Modern UI" apps)
- Remote device management of Windows Phone similar to management of Windows PCs
- VoIP and video chat integration for any VoIP or video chat app (integrates into the phone dialer, people hub)
- Firmware over the air for Windows Phone updates
- Minimum 36 month support of Windows Phone updates to Windows Phone 8 devices.
- Camera app now supports "lenses", which allow third parties to skin and add features to camera interface.
- Native screen capture is added by pressing home and power buttons simultaneously.
- Hebrew language support is added for Microsoft to introduce Windows Phone to the Israeli market.

== Hardware specifications ==
Windows Phone 8 minimum device specifications
Qualcomm Snapdragon S4 dual-core processor or Snapdragon 800 series (as of Update 3)
Minimum 512 MB RAM for WVGA phones; minimum 1 GB RAM for 720p / WXGA / 1080p
Minimum 4 GB flash memory
GPS and A-GNSS; GLONASS is supported, if OEMs decide to include it
Support for micro-USB 2.0
3.5 mm stereo headphone jack with three-button detection support
Rear-facing AF camera with optional LED or Xenon flash, optional front-facing camera (both need to be VGA or better) and dedicated camera button
Accelerometer, proximity and ambient light sensors, as well as vibration motor (magnetometer and gyroscope are optional)
802.11b/g and Bluetooth (802.11n is optional)
DirectX graphics hardware support with hardware acceleration for Direct3D using programmable GPU
Multi-touch capacitive touch screen with minimum of four simultaneous points

== Reception ==
Reviewers generally praised the increased capabilities of Windows Phone 8, but noted the smaller app selection when compared to other phones. Brad Molen of Engadget mentioned that "Windows Phone 8 is precisely what we wanted to see come out of Redmond in the first place," and praised the more customizable Start Screen, compatibility with Windows 8, and improved NFC support. However, Molen also noted the drawback of a lack of apps in the Windows Phone Store. The Verge gave the OS a 7.9/10 rating, stating that "Redmond is presenting one of the most compelling ecosystem stories in the business right now," but criticized the lack of a unified notifications center. Alexandra Chang of Wired gave Windows Phone 8 an 8/10, noting improvement in features previously lacking in Windows Phone 7, such as multi-core processor support, faster Internet browsing, and the switch from Bing Maps to Nokia Maps, but also criticized the smaller selection of apps.

Critics of Windows Phone 8 include Microsoft's Windows division announced the Windows Phone 8 will change kernel to NT kernel (instead of CE kernel in Windows Phone 7) in June 2012 but without pre-notify OEMs (like Nokia and HTC) and developers, and Windows Phone 8 lacks apps and lacks software ecosystem.

=== Usage ===
IDC reported that in Q1 2013, the first full quarter where WP8 was available to most countries, Windows Phone market share jumped to 3.2% of the worldwide smartphone market, allowing the OS to overtake BlackBerry OS as the third largest mobile operating system by usage.

Roughly a year after the release of WP8, Kantar reported in October 2013 that Windows Phone grew its market share substantially to 4.8% in the United States and 10.2% in Europe. Similar statistics from Gartner for Q3 2013 indicated that Windows Phone's global market share increased 123% from the same period in 2012 to 3.6%.

In Q1 2014 IDC reported that global market share of Windows Phone dropped to 2.7%.

== See also ==
- List of Windows Phone 8 devices
