= Bijoux Medusa =

Canadian jewelry store

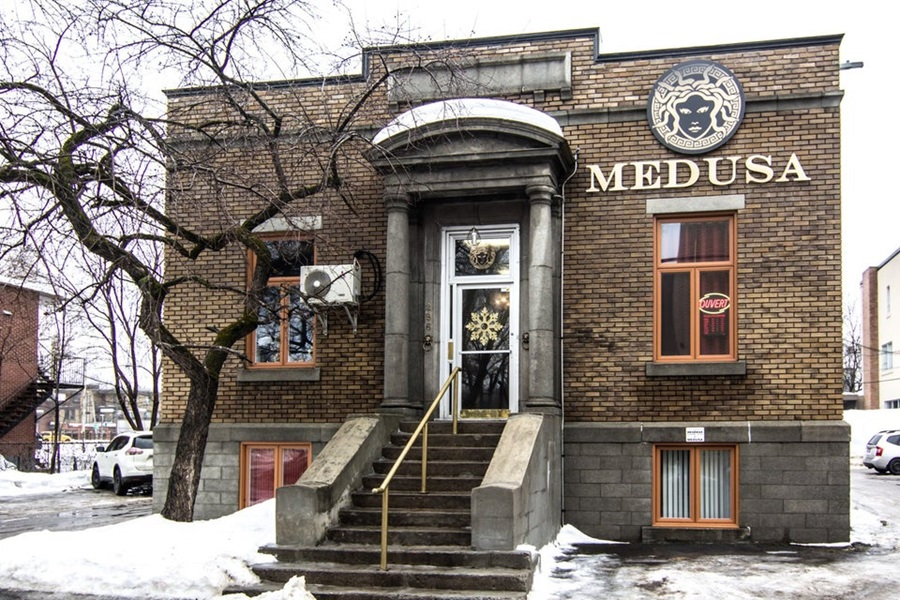
- Trade name: Bijoux Medusa
- Type: Private
- Industry: Retail
- Founded: 2017
- Founder: Julien Duguay
- Headquarters: Québec and Montreal, Canada
- Number of locations: (2017)
- Area served: Worldwide
- Products: Jewellery
- Website: www.medusa.jewelry

Bijoux Medusa is a Canadian jewellery store. It is the only jeweller to receive the MEI Awards from the Ministère de l'Économie et de l'Innovation at the first edition of Expo 2019.

== History ==
The company was founded in Chicoutimi by Julien Duguay in 2017.

In 2019, it received the MEI Awards from the Ministère de l'Économie et de l'Innovationat the Expo 2019.

In 2023, Bijoux Medusa acquired the three rings of the Stanley Cup of Mario Tremblay as well as the trophy of the Molson Cup which are put on display at Laurier Québec for the hockey fans.

In 2023, Medusa Jewelry was a finalist for the Canadian Jewelry Retailer of the Year Award.

== Activities ==
Bijoux Medusa specialises on the retail sale of gold and diamond jewellery, including rings, chains, pendants, necklaces, bracelets, earrings, and watches. Most items are produced using 10-carat gold. Their stores are located in Chicoutimi, Quebec City and Montreal. In addition, they also sell products online via their online boutique, website and mobile app.

== Controversies ==
=== Homeless à Rolex ===
In 2026, Bijoux Medusa launched the web series Homeless à Rolex (Homeless to Rolex), distributed on social media. The series followed six people experiencing homelessness who were assisted with various aspects of their lives while also participating in a competition.

The concept drew criticism, particularly from people working with the homeless, who objected to vulnerable people being publicly exposed and placed in competition with one another. Critics also accused the company of using the participants for promotional purposes. Duguay rejected the criticism, stating that the purpose of the series was to help the participants and raise public awareness about homelessness.

=== Rolex lawsuit ===
In April 2026, Rolex and its Canadian subsidiary filed a lawsuit in the Federal Court of Canada against Bijoux Medusa and its owner, Julien Duguay, alleging trademark infringement and the sale of counterfeit Rolex products.

According to the allegations reported by the media, Rolex claims that watches marketed by Bijoux Medusa contained "counterfeit dials or other non-genuine components" ("cadrans contrefaits ou d’autres composants non authentiques"), including allegedly non-genuine parts or cases. Rolex further alleges that none of the watches at issue meet its quality standards and disputes their marketing as "100% authentic" or "certified pre-owned" Rolex watches.

The dispute concerns, among other products, Rolex watches customized by Bijoux Medusa through the addition of diamonds or other precious stones. Rolex alleges that some of the modified watches constitute counterfeit reproductions and that the company has imitated Rolex designs. According to Rolex, these practices are liable to mislead consumers regarding the origin and actual quality of the products and damage the prestige associated with the Rolex brand.

Bijoux Medusa disputes the allegations. In a statement, the company described the lawsuit as "unfounded" and a "vexatious proceeding", and maintained that all of the watches it sells are authentic. The company argues that adding diamonds and other elements to authentic watches constitutes legitimate customization and characterized Rolex's legal action as an attempt to intimidate a local Canadian business.

Rolex is seeking, among other remedies, an order prohibiting the disputed use of its trademarks, the destruction of material found to unlawfully bear its marks, and damages. The allegations have not been adjudicated by the court.

== See also ==
- Pyrrha Jewelry
- Ben Moss Jewellers
