= Neuchâtel Junior College =

Location
- Crêt-Taconnet 4 Neuchâtel, Neuchâtel, 2000; Switzerland; 46.9965°N 6.9381°E

Information
- Other name: NJC
- Type: Independent international secondary school
- Established: 1956
- Founder: Leonard Wilde
- Educational authority: Ontario Ministry of Education
- Head of school: Philippe Caron-Audet
- Grades: Grade 12 and gap year
- Language: English
- Website: neuchatel.org

Neuchâtel Junior College (or NJC) is a private international school located in the French-speaking town of Neuchâtel, Switzerland. It is a member of Canadian Accredited Independent Schools.

== History ==
NJC was founded in 1956 by Leonard Wilde, an Englishman who was teaching at a local Swiss school in the 1950s.

Wilde travelled to Canada, and taught at Shawnigan Lake School, on Vancouver Island in British Columbia, to become acquainted with the Canadian school system and Canadian students. He was able to recruit the college's first 42 students from Canada in 1956.

NJC is a one-year school accepting 60 to 80 students in their final pre-university year to study the Enriched Ontario Grade 12 curriculum as well as Advanced Placement.

Classes at Neuchâtel Junior College are taught in English, but each student is required to take at least one French course. In addition to this, students live with local families.

== Notable alumni ==
- Sarah Carter, actress
- Jennifer Stoddart, Canadian Privacy Commissioner (2003 to 2013)
- Marc Kielburger, co-founder of Free the Children
- Anthony Lacavera, founder of Globalive and Wind Mobile

== See also ==
- EF Education
- MEI Academy
