= Wind Telecom =

Italian telecommunications holding company

Wind Telecom S.p.A.
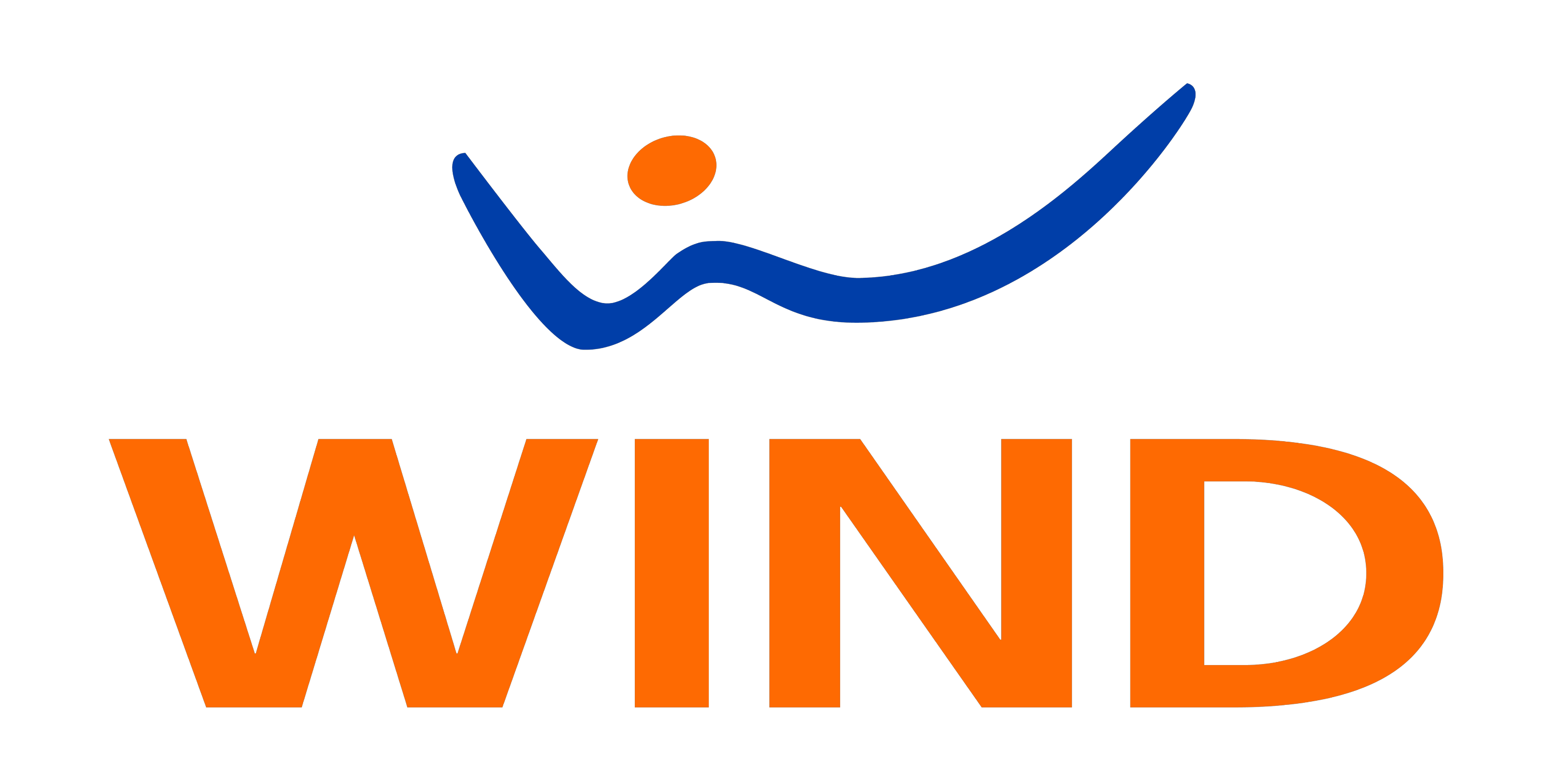

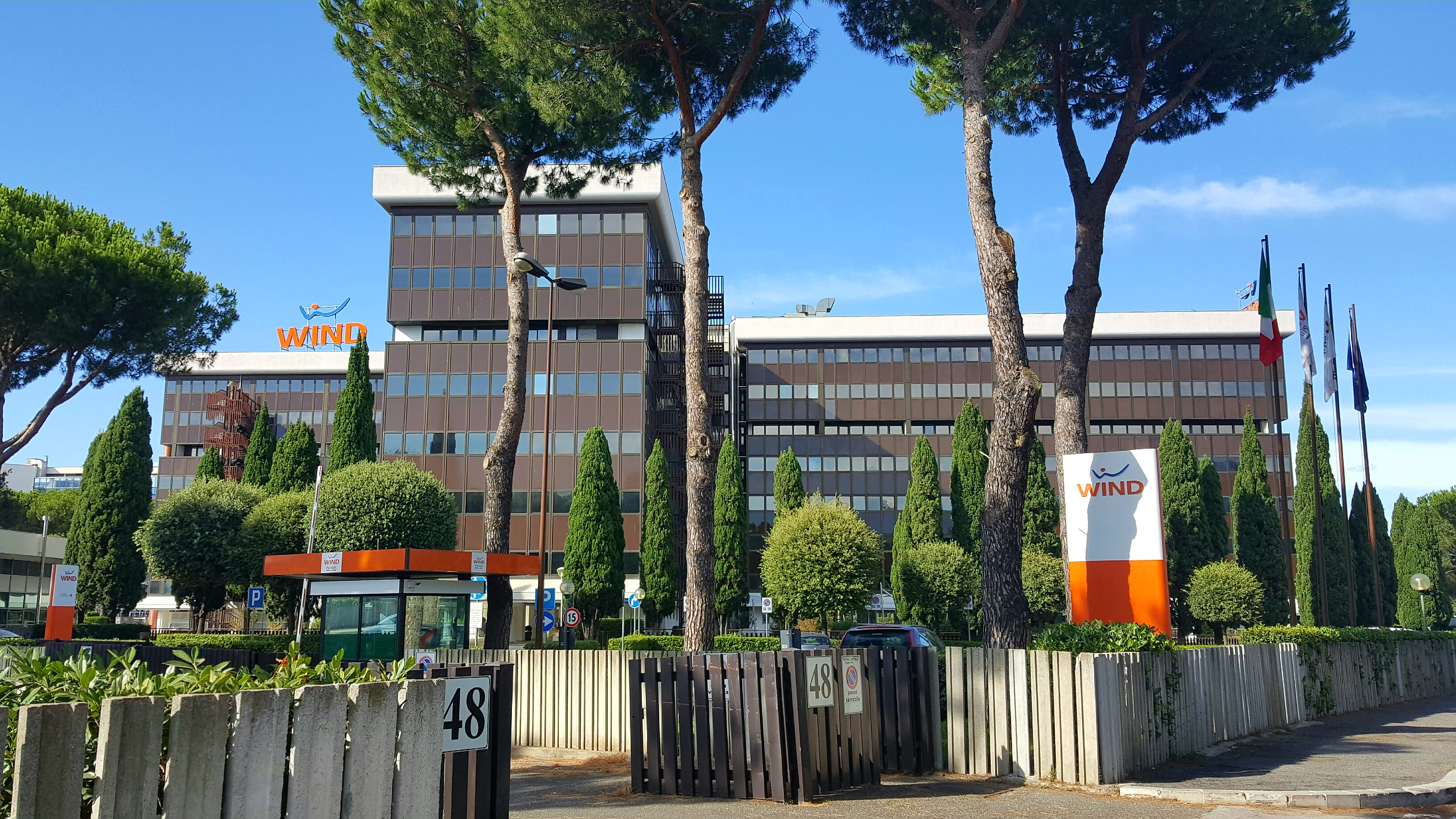
- Wind Telecom headquarters in Rome, Italy
- Formerly: Weather Investments S.p.A. (2005–2011)
- Type: Holding
- Industry: Telecommunications
- Founded: June 2005; 21 years ago in Rome, Italy
- Founder: Naguib Sawiris
- Defunct: December 1, 2017
- Fate: Merged into VimpelCom
- Successor: VimpelCom
- Headquarters: Rome, Italy
- Area served: Italy; Cambodia; Algeria; Bangladesh; Pakistan; Burundi; Zimbabwe; Central African Republic; Egypt; North Korea; Namibia; Greece
- Products: Mobile telephony, fixed-line telephony, Broadband Internet, IT Services, IPTV
- Revenue: 313,000 euro (2009)
- Owner: Weather Investments II (87.88%)
- Parent: VimpelCom
- Subsidiaries: Orascom Telecom (50%); Wind Hellas (100%); Wind Telecomunicazioni (99.996%)
- Website: www.windgroup.it

Wind Telecom S.p.A. (formerly Weather Investments S.p.A.) was an Italian telecommunications holding company owned by the multinational VimpelCom Ltd., originally controlled by Egyptian billionaire Naguib Sawiris.

It operated through its subsidiaries Orascom Telecom, Wind Hellas and Wind Telecomunicazioni until December 2017, when it merged into VimpelCom.

== History ==
In June 2005, the company, named Weather Investments, bought Wind Telecomunicazioni, the third largest Italian mobile phone operator. The total value of the transaction was €12.1 billion.

Also in June 2005, 50% plus 1 share of Orascom Telecom was transferred to Weather Investments.

In 2007 the company acquired the Greek mobile carrier TIM Hellas from Apax Partners and Texas Pacific Group and rebranded it Wind Hellas in a deal worth €3.4 billion (£2.4 billion STG). Unfortunately, the Greek crisis brought the carrier in deep financial troubles, forcing Sawiris to sell the assets of the holding company (Weather Finance III) to a group of creditors, the SSN Ad-Hoc Committee. The transaction has been completed in December 2010.

In early 2008 the company acquired the license to operate mobile services in North Korea under the name Koryolink making history by being the first mobile operator there.

In January 2011, the company decided to change its name to Wind Telecom., due to the intention to bring a new image to the group, focusing to the strong points as leading subject in telecommunications and capitalizing all the value and success achieved by the "Wind" brand in recent years, as declared by Khaled Bichara.

Also in January 2011, OTH completed its sale of Tunisian carrier Tunisiana to Qatar Telecom, in a deal worth $1.2 billion, leaving its previously owned 50 percent of Tunisiana through both Orascom Tunisia Holding and Carthage Consortium.

Following the completion of the merger by incorporation of 3 Italy and Wind Telecomunicazioni, which took place in December 2016, the corporate structure of Wind Tre was reorganised, and in December 2017 the cross-border merger by incorporation of Wind Telecom into VimpelCom took place.

== Operations ==
Wind Telecom S.p.A. owns 100% of Wind Telecomunicazioni S.p.A. (“Wind”), the third largest mobile operator and second largest fixed-line operator in Italy, with more than 19 million mobile subscribers and over 2.9 million direct fixed-line subscribers as of November 2010. Wind Telecom also controls and owns 50% plus one share of Orascom Telecom Holding S.A.E. (“OTH”), a leading international telecommunications company operating GSM networks in seven high growth markets in the Middle East, Africa and South Asia, having a total population under license of approximately 460 million with an average mobile telephony penetration of approximately 29% as at Match 31, 2007. OTH operates GSM network in Algeria, Bangladesh, Egypt, Iraq, Pakistan and Zimbabwe. OTH had over 56 million subscribers as of March 2007. OTH owns 19.3% of Hutchison Telecommunications International, a leading Telecommunications Service Provider operating in eight countries. OTH is traded on the Cairo and Alexandria Stock Exchange and has GDRs traded on the London Stock Exchange (ORTEq.l, OTLD LI).

Wind Telecom S.p.A. is a leading international telecommunications company offering mobile, fixed, Internet and international communications services to about 100 million subscribers in Algeria, Bangladesh, Egypt, Italy, Pakistan and North Korea.

Wind Telecom subsidiary Orascom Telecom Holding formerly had an indirect equity ownership in Canadian mobile operator Wind Mobile which had been granted a spectrum license in Canada, and now independently owned by Canadian telecom company Shaw Communications.

== Shareholder structure ==
The Wind Telecom group is structured as follows:

Weather Investments II S.à.r.l.
Wind Telecom S.p.A. 87,88%
Wind Acquisition Holdings Finance S.p.A. 99,996%	Wind Hellas Telecommunications S.A. 100%	Orascom Telecom Holding S.A.E. 50%
Wind Telecomunicazioni S.p.A. 100%
