= Gianni Di Giovanni =

Italian journalist

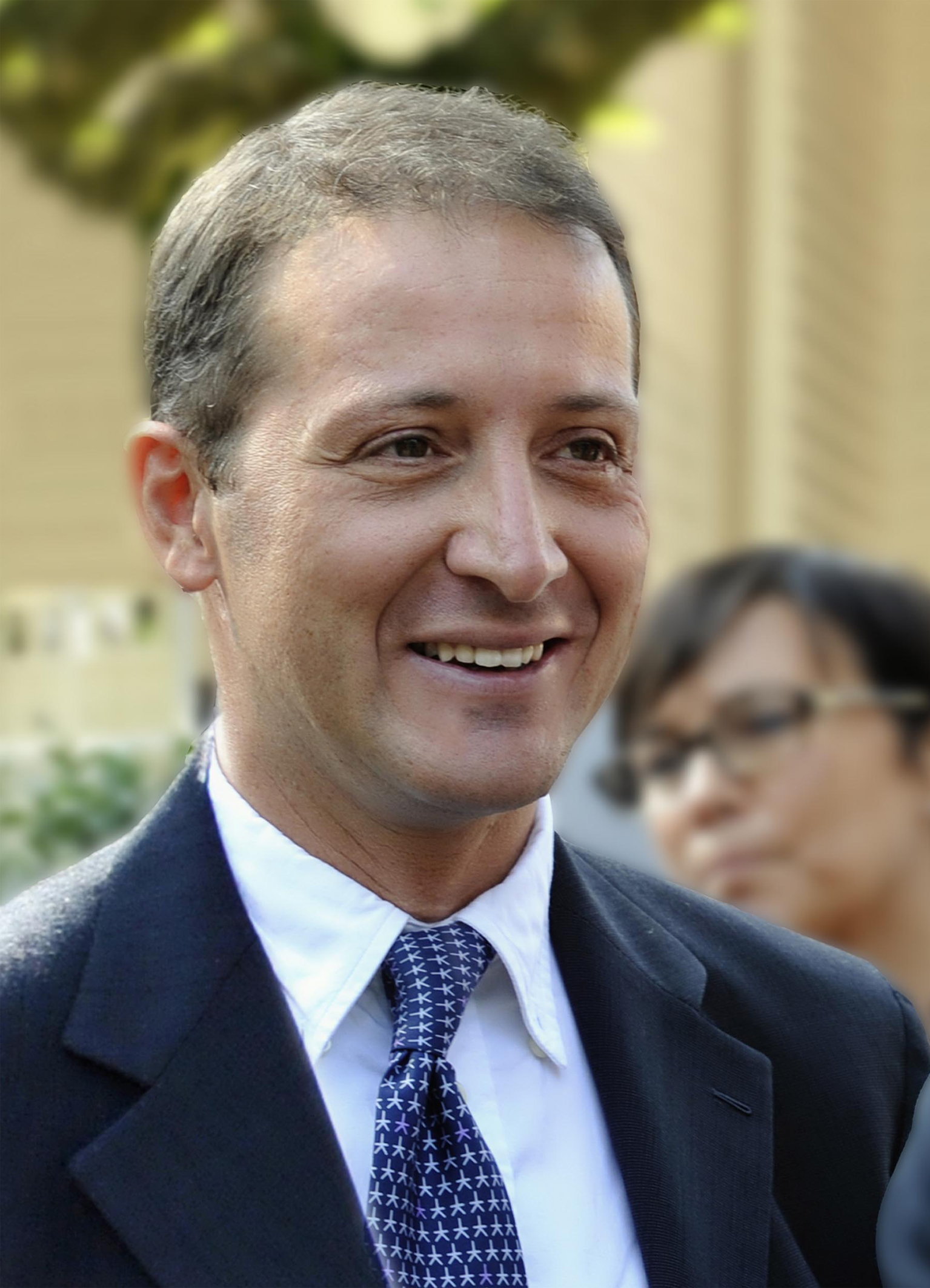
Image of Gianni Di Giovanni

Gianni Di Giovanni (born July 3, 1963, in Potenza, Italy) is an Italian manager and journalist.

He is the chairman of the board of directors of Eni China BV, Chairman of the Board of Directors of Eni Energy China Ltd, and Executive Vice President of the Eni Representative Office in Beijing.

== Education and career ==
Di Giovanni completed a degree in political science in 1986 at the Sapienza University of Rome. He then worked for the IRI for six years, before completing graduate studies in journalism at the Catholic University of Milan.

In 1994, he was appointed head of public relations at Stet International and head of Institutional Affairs at SMH and Stet International Netherlands, roles in which he worked until 1998, when he became head of communications for Telecom Italia's TIM.

From November 2000 to December 2006, he was head of public relations for the Italian mobile carrier Wind.

Di Giovanni was one of the early proponents of new media, as well as the relaunch of traditional media such as radio, spending 15 years working for telecommunications across South America, Eastern Europe, India and China during open market and privatisation processes in these regions.

From January 2006 to July 2013, he was Eni's executive vice president for public communications.

In July 2012 he was appointed chairman of the Italian press agency AGI (Agenzia Giornalistica Italiana), a position which he held until his appointment as chief executive officer of the agency in July 2013, when he was also appointed vice-president of national press agencies at Fieg (the Italian federation of newspaper publishers).

Since October 2015, Di Giovanni has been chairman of the board of directors of Eni Co Inc. He is also chairman of the board of directors of Eni USA R&M Co. Inc., a company which produces and distributes lubricants in North America.

Since October 2015, he has been executive vice chairman of Eni's Washington D.C. branch office.

Since October 2020, he has been chairman of the board of directors of Eni China BV and executive vice-president of Eni's Beijing branch office.

Since 2024, he has been chairman of the board of directors of Energy China Ltd, responsible for downstream activities and decarbonization for energy products in China.

Since 2022, he has been a member of the Advisory Council of the EUCCC – European Chamber of Commerce of China, and since 2023, he has been the State Representative of Italy within the EUCC. In this context, he was then elected for the years 2023 and 2024 – among the 27 national representatives within the EU delegation in China – as a member of the EXCO of the European institution in Beijing.

Since November 2017, he has been board director of the Atlantic Council, an American think tank that promotes leadership and engagement in international affairs.

During 2018, he was awarded an executive master's degree in Climate Change and Energy: Policymaking for the Long Term at Harvard University, The Kennedy School of Government.

He was the editor-in-chief of the platform ABO - About Oil and print magazine Oil, energy news publications, as well as the periodical Professione Gestore, a publication through which Eni communicates with managers throughout Italy.

He is a member of the faculty at the master programme in Media Relations and Communications at the Graduate School of Media Communication and Performing Arts at the Catholic University of Milan, as well as at the master programme in Digital Journalism at the Lateranense Postgraduate Centre – CLAS at the Pontifical Lateran University in Rome.

== Publications ==
In 2010, Gianni Di Giovanni and Stefano Lucchini published Niente di più facile, niente di più difficile – Manuale (pratico) per la comunicazione through publisher Fausto Lupetti Editore. The book is a guide to traditional and new media communication tools.

In 2013, the publishing house Rizzoli Etas published Di Giovanni and Lucchini's La casa di vetro. Comunicare l'azienda nell'era digitale. The book deals with how business communication has changed with the advent of the internet and social media.
