= Onkosh =

- Website type: Search Engine
- Available in: Arabic, English
- Owner: Orascom Telecom
- Creator: Heba Matta
- Website: www.onkosh.com
- Commercial: yes

Onkosh (Arabic: أنكش) was an Orascom Telecom product that functioned as a search portal for the Arabic Web. Onkosh was launched in September 2007 and closed down on August 11, 2010. Comparative Arabic web search websites that are still operational include Yabhath and Yamli.

Onkosh understood the Arabic language and utilized advanced Natural Language Processing (NLP) techniques to ensure that the best Arabic results for search queries were received. It offered services that facilitated searching in Arabic, such as the virtual keyboard and a unique feature called Bel-3araby, which was used to search for Arabic using English characters and popular character replacements like "3" for "ع" and "7" for "ح".

Onkosh provided the following search sections :

Web Search - Search through the Arabic web and some English and French content.
Image Search - A comprehensive image search service built upon Picsearch
Blog Search - Search through all Arabic and Arab-related blogs. Had a popular videos section that displayed the top videos shared by bloggers.
File Search - Search for multimedia files like music, videos, wallpapers and ringtones.
Forum - Search through popular Arabic forums
News - Arabic news aggregator that displayed news from the top Arabic news sites.
Directory Search - Directory listing based upon the Arabic Open Directory.

Onkosh.mobi was a tailored version of Onkosh designed specifically for mobiles.

Later on Onkosh was shut down due to lack of financial resources as Orascom stopped its support for the project because it was not gaining the expected revenue.

== Content ==
Daily News Egypt

Trade Arabia

Washington Bureau
