= Khaled Bichara =

Egyptian businessman and entrepreneur (1971–2020)

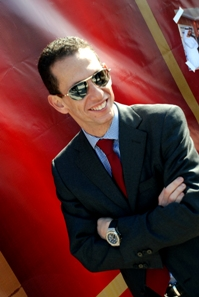
- Born: July 27, 1971; Cairo, Egypt
- Died: January 31, 2020 (aged 48); Giza, Egypt
- Education: The American University in Cairo (B.Sc)

Khaled Bichara (Arabic: خالد بشارة, IPA: [ˈxæːled bɪˈʃɑːɾˤɑ]) (July 27, 1971 – January 31, 2020) was an Egyptian businessman and entrepreneur who served as the chairman of link.net and chief executive officer of Accelero Capital. Prior to joining Accelero Capital, Bichara was chief executive officer of Orascom Telecom Media and Technology OTMT, group president and chief operating officer of VimpelCom Ltd., and executive chairman of Global Telecom Holding. Bichara played a pivotal role in the merger of VEON and Wind Telecom to create the world's sixth-largest telecommunications carrier.

== Early life and education ==
Khaled Galal Bichara was born on 27 July 1971 in Cairo, Egypt. Bichara earned his BSc degree from The American University in Cairo in 1993 with a major in computer science and a minor in business administration. He has also attended a number of professional and postgraduate courses, including the Executive Program for Growing Companies at Stanford University and another at the American University of Cairo Institute of Banking and Finance.

== Career ==
=== LINKdotNET ===
In 1996, after a short experience with Microlab, a software company, he co-founded LINKdotNET (at the time called LINK Egypt) an Internet service provider (ISP) company in Egypt. In 2000, he was appointed by Orascom Telecom Holding as the company's chief Internet strategist. In 2002, Khaled Bichara was involved in a partnership between Microsoft and LINKdotNET which resulted in the launching of MSN Arabia, the first global portal of its kind in the region.

LINKdotNET, under Khaled Bichara's leadership, acquired eight internet companies. This acquisition increased the workforce to more than 1,500 making the company the largest private ISP in the region.

Khaled Bichara became a member of the board of directors at Orascom Telecom Holding in 2003. He was also recognized as the “Young Executive of the Year” by Business Today Egypt.

=== Wind Telecomunicazioni S.p.A. ===
Bichara was appointed to head the fixed line and portal business unit at Wind Telecomunicazioni S.p.A., a subsidiary company of Wind Telecom S.p.A. located in Italy, in 2005. He was promoted in 2006 to the position of chief operating officer of the company. During this period he was responsible for the transformation of Wind Telecomunicazioni S.p.A., initially a company on the downturn, in just three years, into one of the best performing mobile, fixed line and broadband integrated operators in the continent.

=== Orascom Telcom Holding ===
Orascom Telecom Holding became the largest investor in LINKdotNET in 1999, with a 54% stake in the company. In 2000, Khaled Bichara was appointed its chief Internet strategist before joining the board three years later. In April 2009, Khaled Bichara was appointed the chief operating officer (COO) of Orascom Telecom Holding, replacing the former officer Emad Farid.

In November 2009, the company announced Khaled Bichara's appointment as the new group chief executive officer of Orascom Telecom Holding saying “Khaled is dynamic, energetic and will be able to draw on his successful experience in the restructuring of Wind to gear the Group into a more aggressive period of growth and transform OTH into a more innovative, integrated and agile global company.”

== Personal life ==
He was married to Marianne Bichara and has two children, Sherif Bichara and Galal Bichara.

Bichara died in a car crash in Giza, Egypt, on 31 January 2020 at the age of 48. His funeral was held at St. Mark Coptic Orthodox Church (Cleopatra) in Heliopolis, Cairo

== See also ==
- Orascom Telecom Holding
- Wind Telecom S.p.A. (former Weather Investments S.p.A.)
- LINKdotNET
