= Wind Telecomunicazioni =

Former Italian telecommunications company

Wind Telecomunicazioni S.p.A.
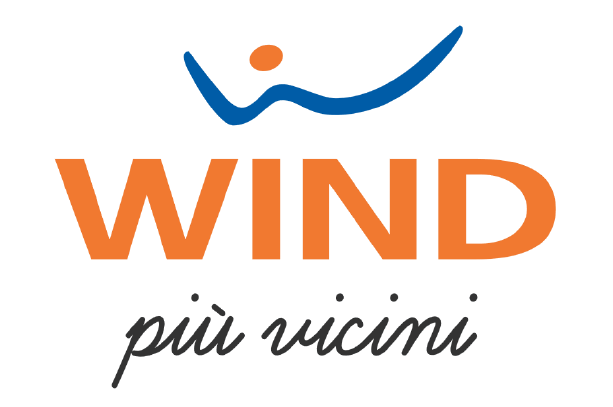

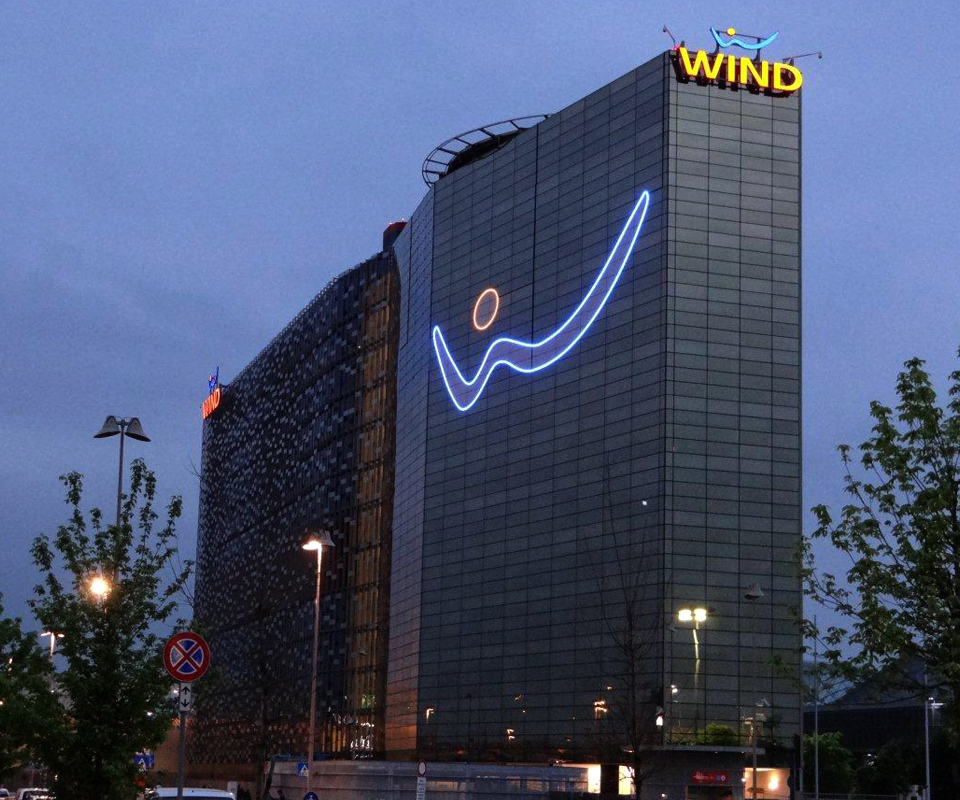
- Wind headquarters in Rho, Italy
- Company type: Subsidiary
- Industry: Telecommunications
- Founded: 1 December 1997; 28 years ago in Rome, Italy
- Founder: Enel; France Télécom; Deutsche Telekom
- Defunct: December 31, 2016 (as company); March 16, 2020 (as brand)
- Fate: Merged with 3 Italy into Wind Tre
- Successor: Wind Tre
- Headquarters: Rho and Rome, Italy
- Area served: Italy
- Key people: Maximo Ibarra (CEO)
- Products: Mobile telephony, fixed-line telephony, Broadband Internet, IT Services, IPTV
- Revenue: € 4,633,000,000 (2014)
- Net income: € −709,000,000 (2014)
- Owner: Wind Telecom (99.996%)
- Parent: VimpelCom
- Subsidiaries: Infostrada (100%)
- Website: www.wind.it

Wind Telecomunicazioni S.p.A., more commonly known as Wind, was an Italian telecommunications company of the VimpelCom Ltd. group, which offered mobile telephony services and, through Infostrada, also fixed-line telephony services, Internet and IPTV.

It was founded on 1 December 1997 by Enel, France Télécom and Deutsche Telekom, and then passed in 2005 under the control of Weather Investments, which in 2011 became part of the VimpelCom group.

On 31 December 2016, the merger between 3 Italy and Wind into Wind Tre was completed. This merger project, carried out by CK Hutchison Holdings and VimpelCom, envisaged the creation of an equal joint venture to combine telephony services in Italy. However, the Wind brand remained active until 16 March 2020, when it was replaced by the single Wind Tre brand.

Wind had 21.6 million mobile customers with a market share of 22.9% (placing itself behind TIM and Vodafone) and 2.8 million customers on fixed-lines with a market share of 13.2% (that makes it the second largest fixed line operator, behind Telecom Italia). The company served through a network of 159 owned stores and around 498 exclusive franchised outlets under the Wind brand, as well as 396 electronic chain stores.

== History ==
Wind was established on 1 December 1997 by Enel, France Télécom and Deutsche Telekom, which sold Wind in 2005 to Weather Investments.

In 1999 Olivetti sells Infostrada to Mannesmann and in 2001 it will become the property of Enel, which will incorporate it in 2002 into Wind, that continued to use the brand.

In 2006 the group appointed Khaled Bichara as the chief operating officer of the company.

In 2011 Wind became part of VimpelCom group, after a merger between the Russian company and the Egyptian Orascom Telecom: the newborn group appointed Khaled Bichara Chairman of Wind and Ossama Bessada CEO, after Luigi Gubitosi's exit.

Wind was the third mobile operator to join the Italian market, after TIM (formerly SIP) and Vodafone (formerly Omnitel).

Wind had run a GSM (900/1800/E900), GPRS, EDGE, UMTS (videocall and mobile broadband), HSPA and LTE network. While the GSM/GPRS/EDGE network is available almost everywhere, UMTS, HSPA and LTE are still expanding in the country. Wind has been also the exclusive provider for Italy of i-mode.

In April 2013, Wind announced it would be investing $1.3 billion on building a fourth-generation (4G) mobile broadband network to catch-up with its rivals TIM and Vodafone.

During 2015 and 2016, an agreement was stipulated between CK Hutchison Holdings, owner of 3 Italy, and VimpelCom for the creation of an equal joint venture in Italy.

On December 31, 2016, Wind was merged with 3 Italy into Wind Tre.

Despite the merger, the Wind and Infostrada brands continued to operate independently of the 3 Italy brand in the private sector.

On May 23, 2017 Wind Business was merged with 3 Business, giving life to Wind Tre Business, which combines all the services dedicated to VAT-registered customers and companies.

On March 16, 2020, after the merger of the Wind-3 mobile networks completed at the end of 2019, the company carried out a rebranding, replacing the old Wind and 3 Italy brands with the new Wind Tre single brand, both for mobile telephony and for fixed-line telephony.

== Awards ==
In 2009, it launched a project named 10decimi which was meant to facilitate the communication between donors and the charities they support. The venture won them the "Lombard Elite – The Milan Finance Company" award for their dedication to corporate social responsibility.

In 2015, it was awarded the title of telecommunications operator of the Year in Italy.

== Sponsorship ==
Wind was the main sponsor of A.S. Roma football club from 2007 to 2013.

== Infostrada ==
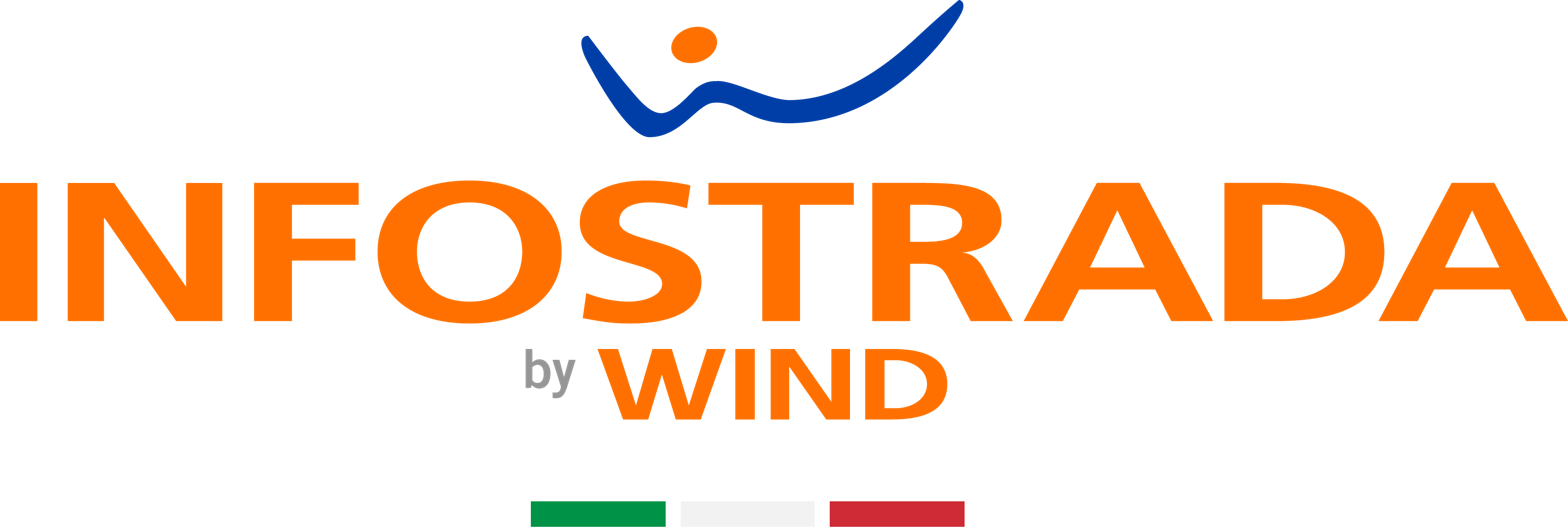
Infostrada

Infostrada S.p.A., more commonly known as Wind Infostrada, was the subsidiary of Wind Telecomunicazioni S.p.A. that dealt with its fixed-line telephony services, xDSL and optical fiber.

Infostrada was born in 1996 from an agreement between Olivetti Telemedia and Bell Atlantic, with the aim of competing with Telecom Italia in the fixed telephony sector.

At the end of 1996 the company had 430 employees and closed the first financial year with a turnover of 72 billion lire.

In 1997 Mannesmann took over from the American partner, controlling Infostrada through the Dutch Olivetti Mobile Telephony Services, then OliMan (50.1% Olivetti, 49.9% Mannesmann), which will also become a shareholder of Omnitel.

In 1998 Infostrada reached an agreement with Ferrovie dello Stato which provides for the acquisition of the right to access the infrastructure of the FS for the laying of telephone cables and the right to use part of the optical fiber cables of the RFI (approximately 1770 km), for 30 years.

In 1999 Olivetti sells Infostrada to Mannesmann and in 2001 it will become the property of Enel, which will incorporate it in 2002 into Wind, that continued to use the brand.

On December 31, 2016, Wind. merged into Wind Tre, and as also happened for Wind, the brand will still be used by the company until the rebranding in March 2020.

== Brands and logos ==
=== Wind ===
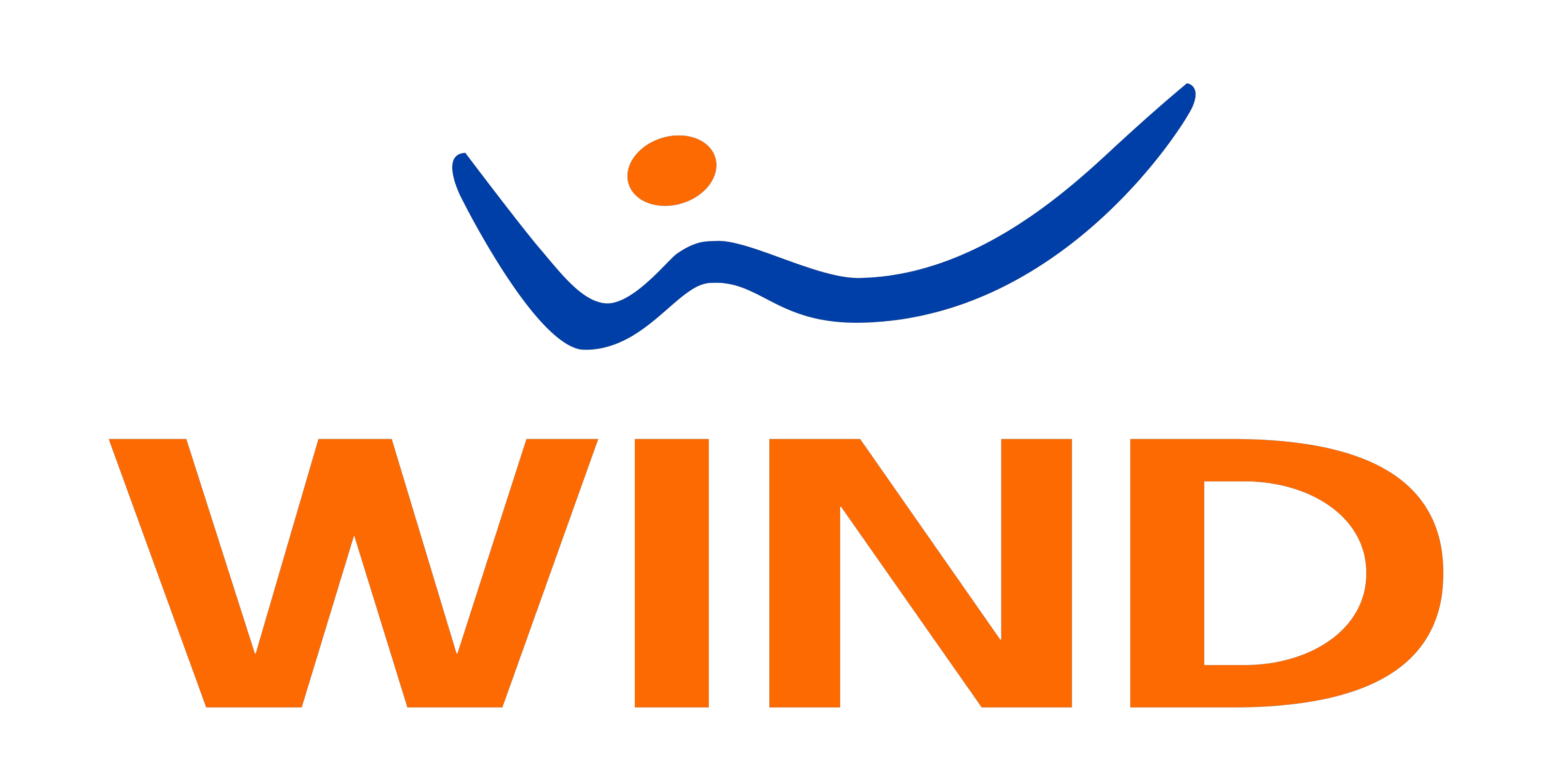
1997–2012

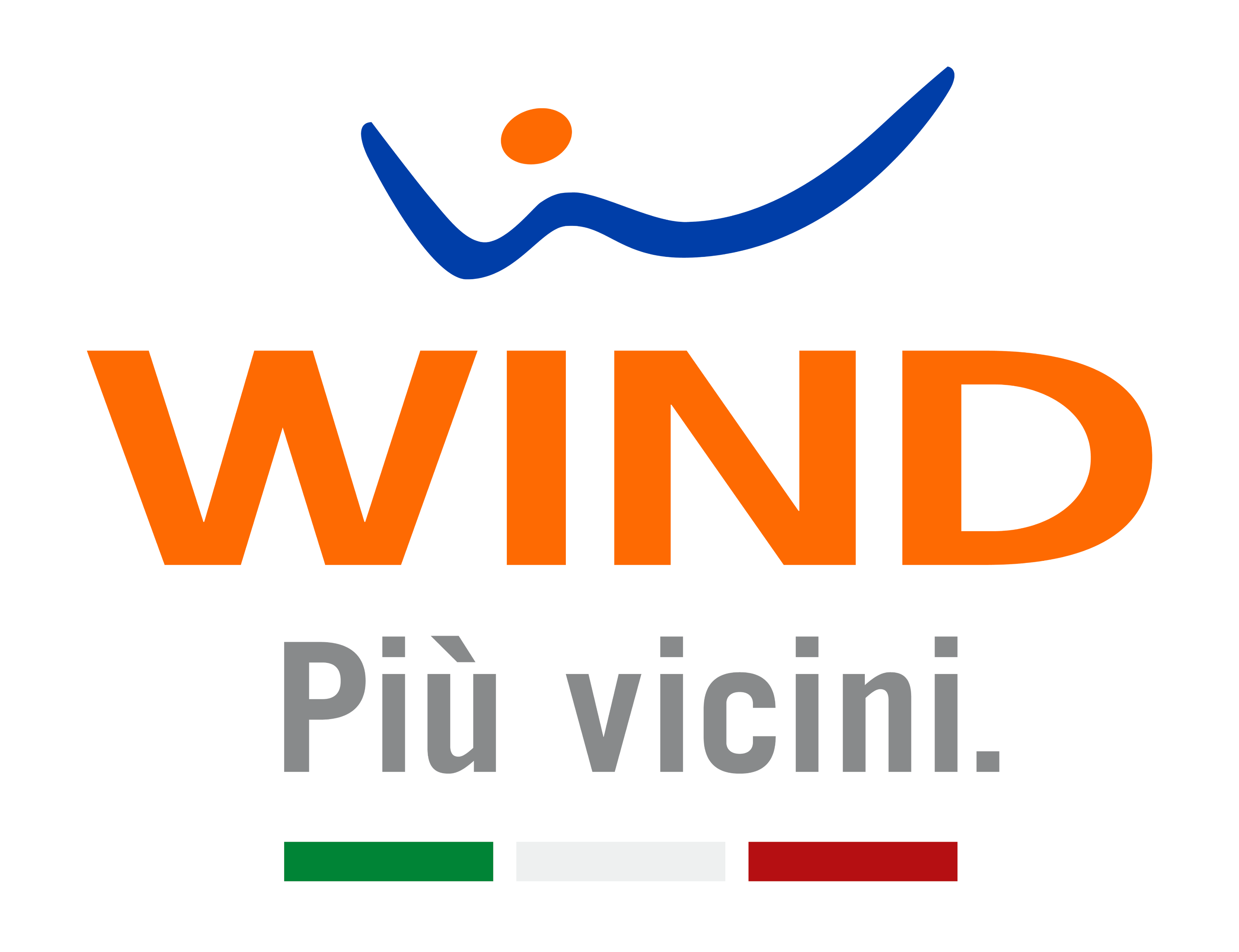
2012–2018

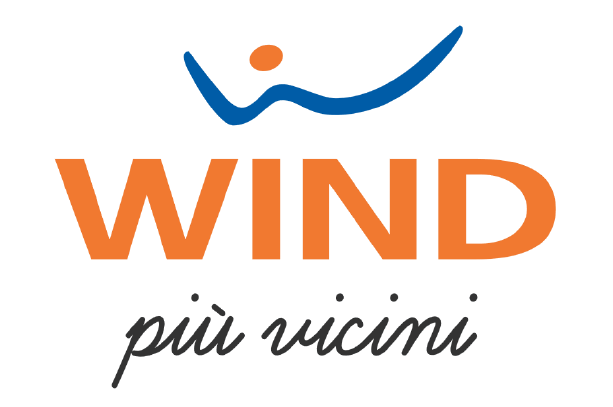
2018–2020

=== Wind Business ===
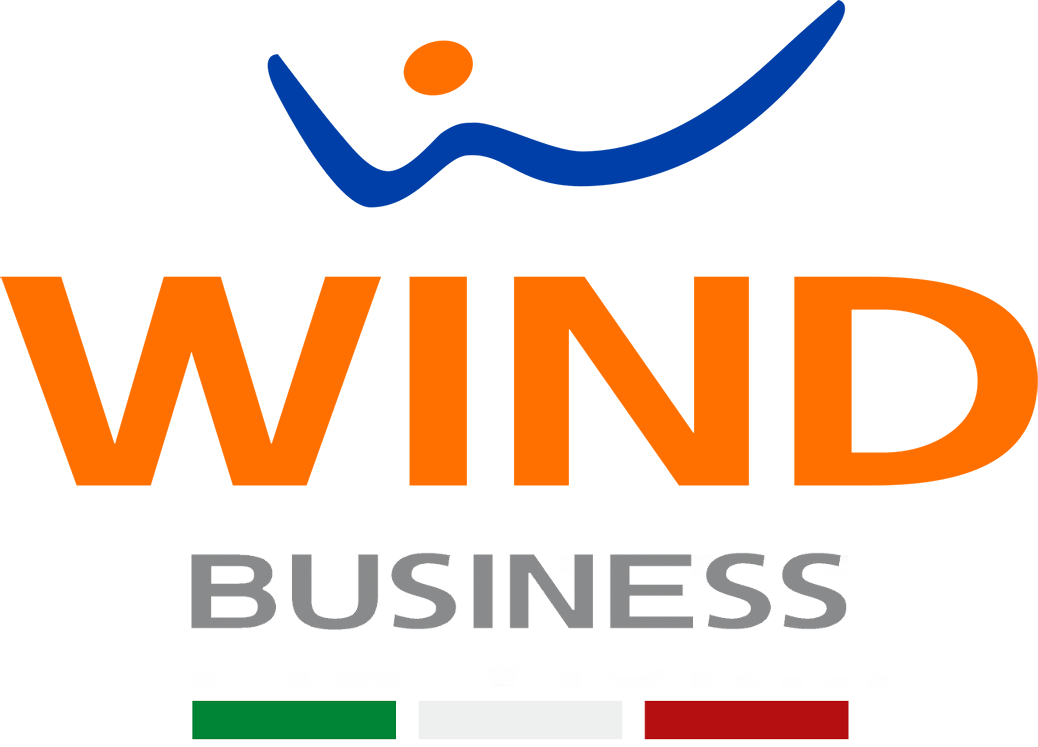
2012–2017

=== Infostrada ===
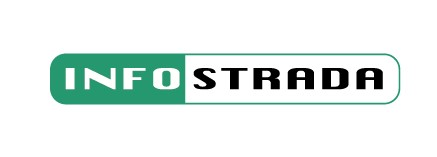
1996–2002

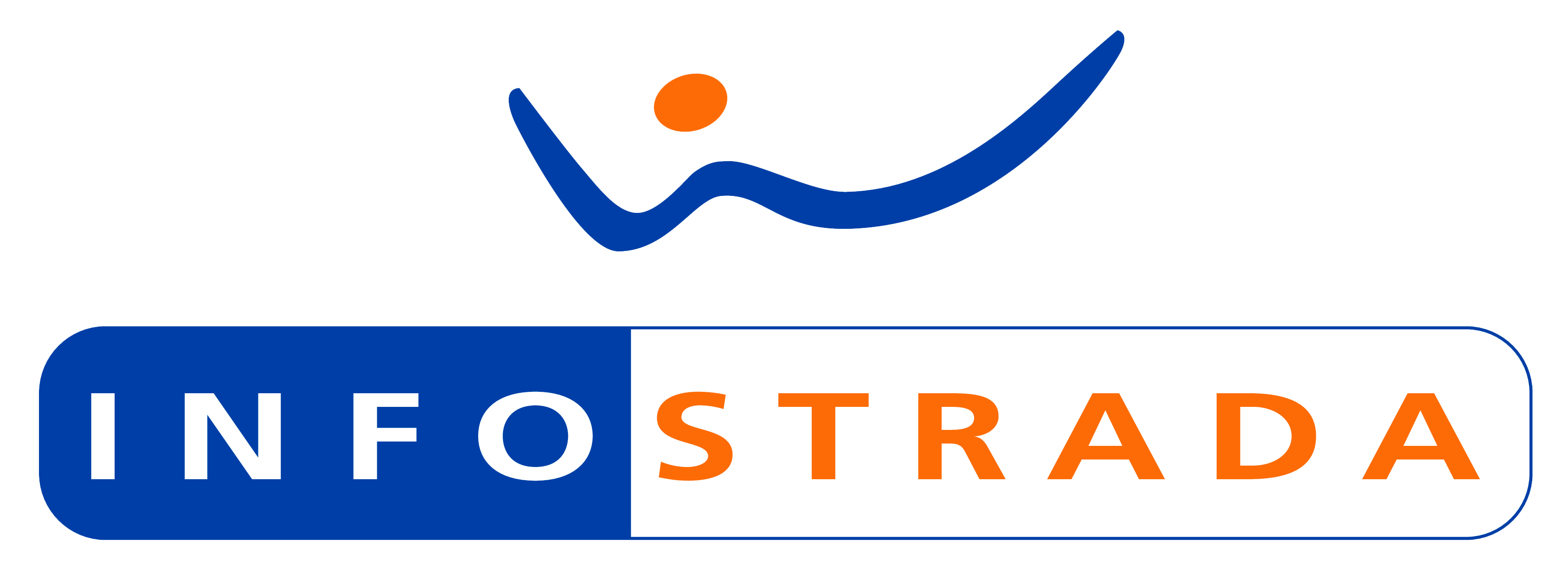
2002–2006

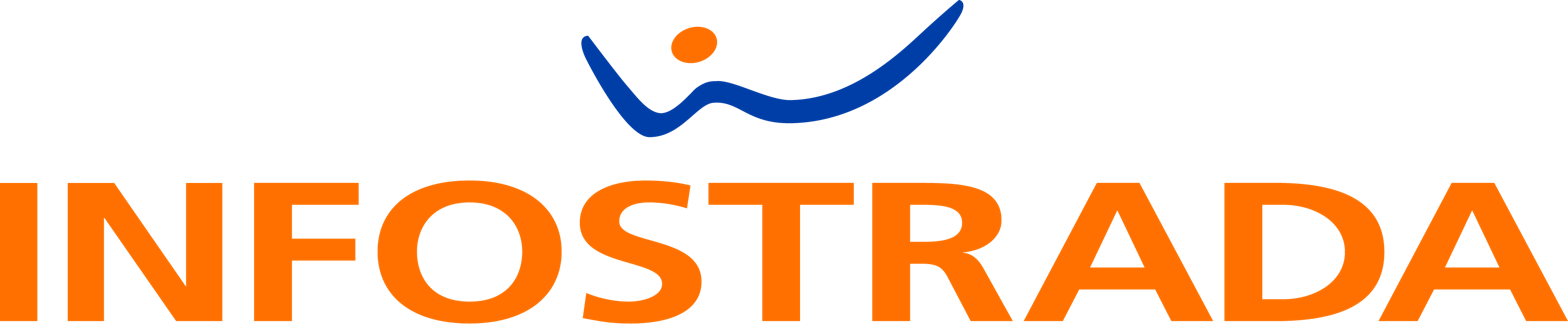
2006–2012

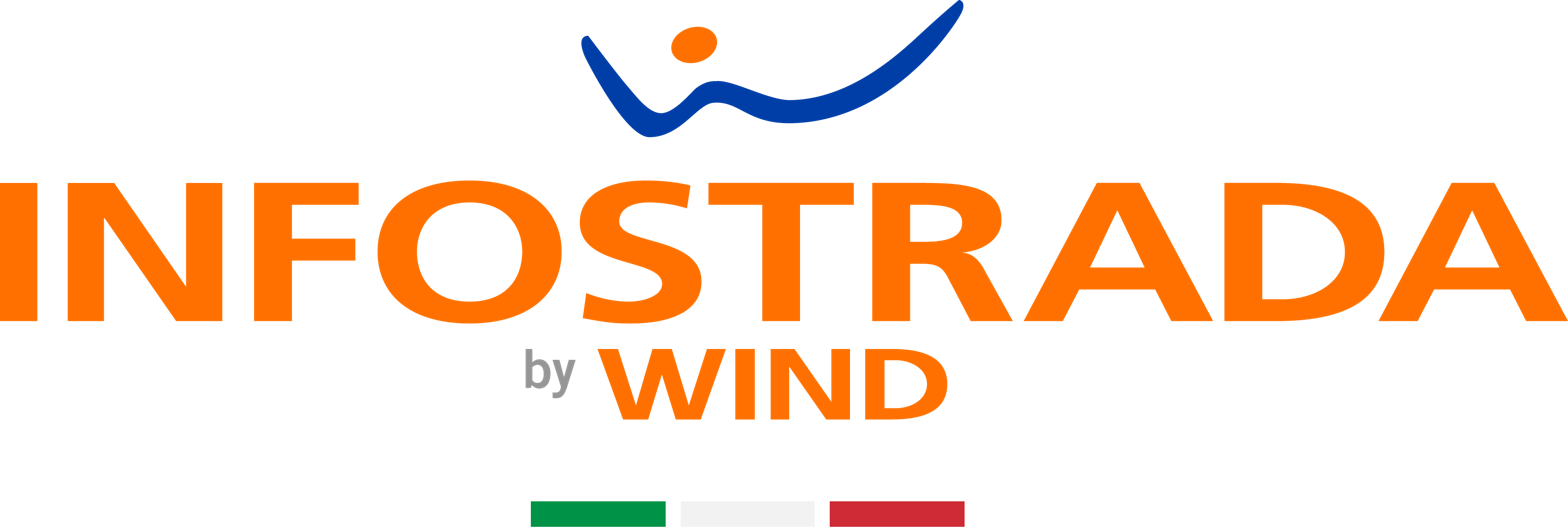
2012–2017

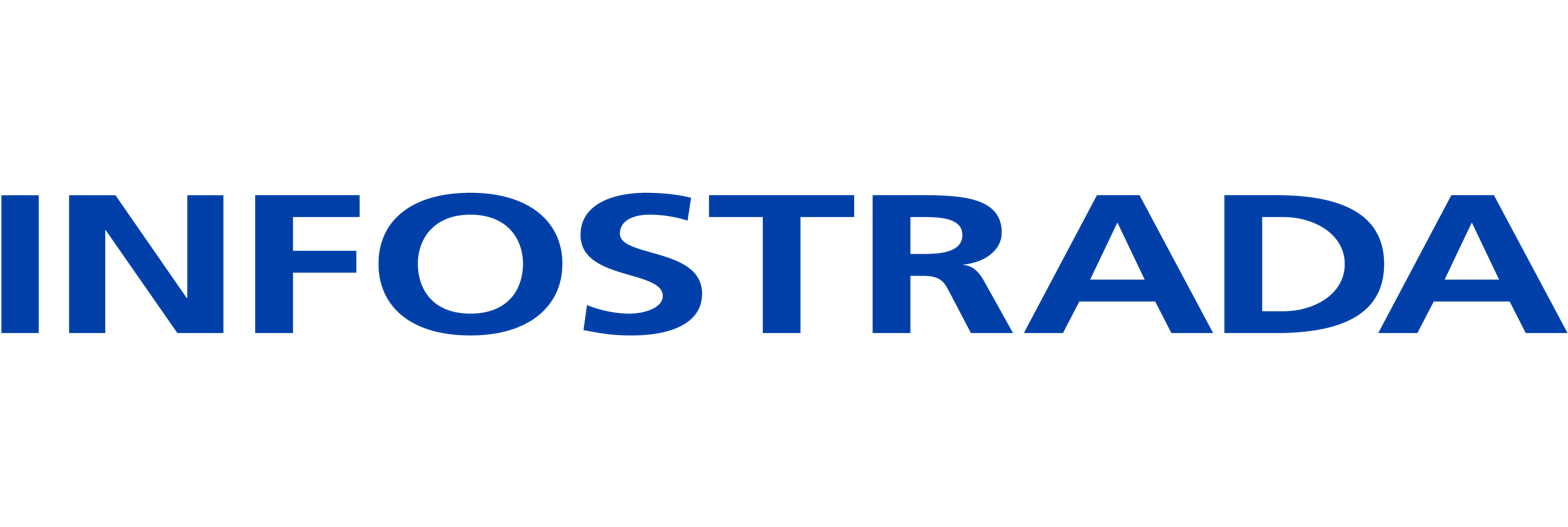
2017–2020

== Shareholder structure ==
The Wind group was structured as follows:

Wind Telecom S.p.A.
Wind Acquisition Holdings Finance S.p.A. 99,996%
Wind Telecomunicazioni S.p.A. 100%
Wind Retail S.r.l. 100%	Wind Acquisition Holdings Finance S.A. 100%	Wind Acquisition Holdings Finance II S.A. 27%	Wind Finance SL S.A. 27%

== See also ==
- 3 Italy
- Bell Atlantic
- Deutsche Telekom
- Enel
- France Télécom
- Infostrada TV
- Olivetti
- VimpelCom
- Wind Hellas
- Wind Telecom
- Wind Tre
