= Julien Duguay =

Canadian jeweler (born 1992)

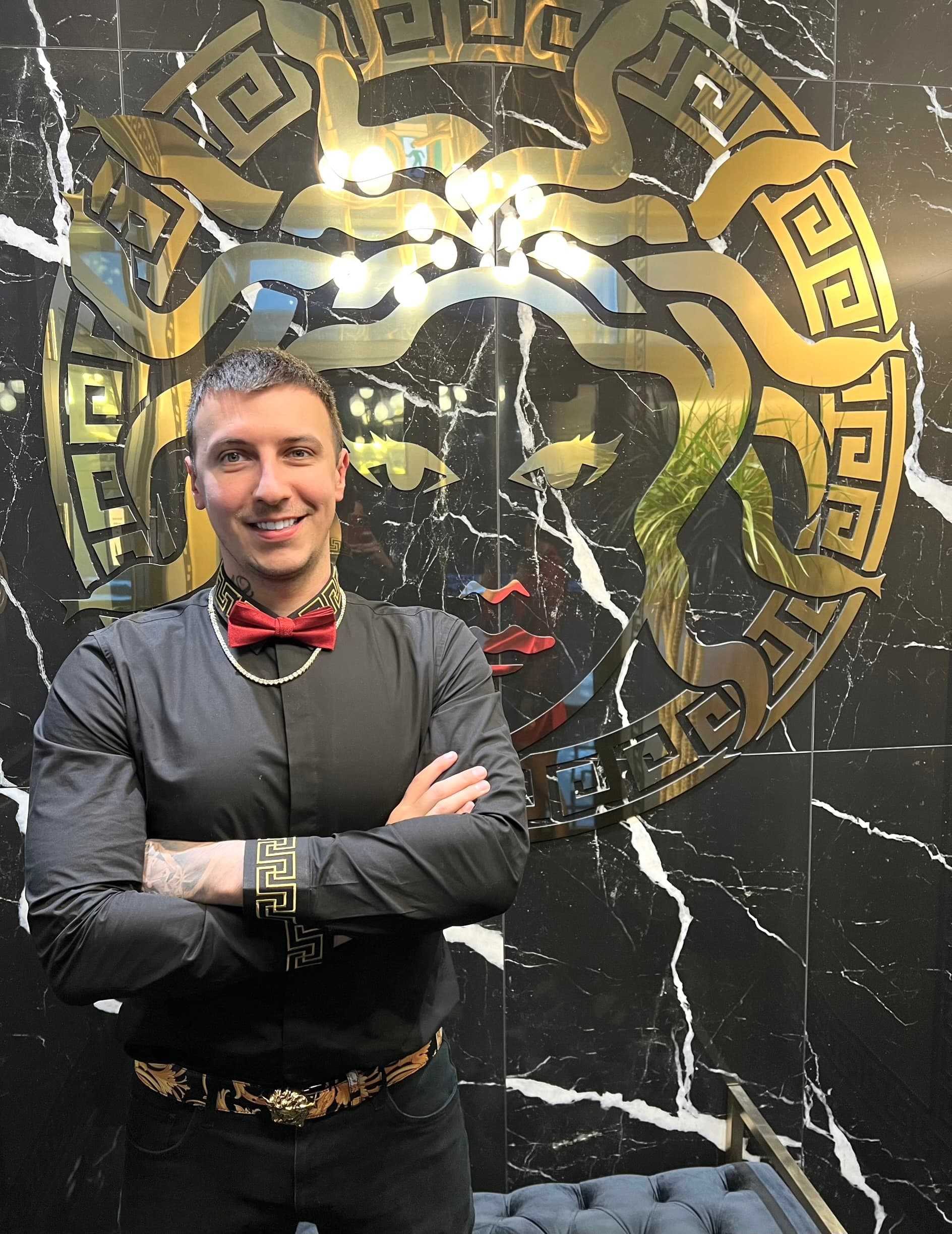
- Born: 1992 (age 33–34); Chicoutimi, Saguenay
- Occupations: Entrepreneur, jeweler
- Known for: Bijoux Medusa

Julien Duguay is a Canadian businessman and jeweler known for founding the Medusa Jewelry chain in Canada. In 2026, several controversies involving Duguay received coverage in Quebec media and generated widespread reactions on social media.

== Education ==
Julien was born in Chicoutimi, Saguenay in 1992. He did primary from École Notre-Dame-Des Jolis-Prés and high schooling from École secondaire privée le Séminaire de Chicoutimi. He also graduated from the Gemological Institute of America at California.

== Career ==
Julien began his career with a small jewellery shop in Tessier Street. Initially he started selling through online. Later in 2017, he established his brand Bijoux Medusa where he presently serves as president.

In 2023, he acquired Mario Tremblay's three Stanley Cup rings and the Molson Cup trophy, which are now on display at Bijouterie de Québec for hockey fans.

In 2024, he has been featured on Histoire de Succès on TVA.

== Controversies ==
=== Homeless à Rolex ===
In 2026, Duguay created and hosted Homeless à Rolex, a web series in which six men experiencing homelessness competed for a luxury watch and a cash prize while receiving assistance intended to improve their housing, employment and personal circumstances.

As part of the series, participants, several of whom were reported to have substance-use problems, were given $1,000 in cash. At the end of each week, participants were required to account for their spending and discuss their progress at an elimination dinner, after which Duguay and intervention worker Yves Labonté decided which participant would leave the competition.

The series was criticized by professionals and organizations working with people experiencing homelessness. Éric Edström, spokesperson for the Réseau solidarité itinérance du Québec, said that the program failed to respect the dignity of participants and accused the production of exploiting their precarious circumstances to generate publicity.

Jean-Philippe Gagnon, director of the Centre d’aide et prévention jeunesse (CAPJ) in Lévis, also criticized what he described as inappropriate intervention techniques, including the tracking of participants, undue pressure and a lack of empathy. According to Gagnon, two participants contacted workers associated with the CAPJ and reported feeling wronged, threatened, followed and filmed against their wishes. Gagnon said the organization intended to assist the individuals in asserting their rights. Gagnon also criticized the decision to give $1,000 in cash to participants experiencing substance-use problems and then confront them on camera about how the money had been spent, arguing that this placed vulnerable participants in a situation in which they were likely to fail and contributed to stigma surrounding homelessness and addiction.

Duguay defended the project, stating that its goal was to provide participants with a genuine opportunity to improve their circumstances. He said participants continued to receive support even after they were no longer being filmed.

In August 2026, 24 heures reported that Duguay was filmed laughing while discussing the idea of cleaning homeless participants with a pressure washer. The publication noted that the remarks came less than three weeks after he had defended Homeless à Rolex against accusations that it exploited vulnerable people for publicity.

=== Controversial remarks at StreamerFest ===
In August 2026, Duguay organized StreamerFest, an event in Miami involving approximately a dozen Quebec social-media personalities who produced livestreamed content from a villa and a yacht.

During a livestream from the yacht, Duguay made sexually explicit comments about female members of the yacht's staff while complaining about the quality of the service. Referring to the $180,000 paid for the event, he stated that, at that price, the women should have sex with the clients. Quebec media characterized the remarks as misogynistic and sexist.

During another livestreamed interaction, Duguay attempted to kiss content creator Lauriane Siegwald. After she declined, Le Journal de Québec reported that Duguay reacted aggressively toward her. Several other content creators attending the event publicly criticized Duguay's remarks. Streamer Lewis le Fou criticized the misogynistic nature of the comments, while former Occupation Double participant Mathieu Pellerin asked members of the production team to intervene when sexist comments were made.

Several participants subsequently left StreamerFest before its scheduled conclusion. Duguay told Le Journal de Québec that some participants had left because they feared losing sponsors as a result of the controversy.

In an interview following the controversy, Duguay acknowledged that the event had gone too far because of his comments. He described the statements as jokes, said that he had consumed alcohol during the event, apologized to people he had offended and stated that he deeply regretted making the remarks.

=== Rolex lawsuit over alleged sale of counterfeit watches ===
In April 2026, Rolex and its Canadian subsidiary filed a lawsuit in the Federal Court of Canada against Bijoux Medusa and its owner, Julien Duguay, personally, alleging trademark infringement and the sale of counterfeit Rolex products.

Rolex alleges that Duguay and his company marketed watches bearing Rolex trademarks that contained "counterfeit dials or other non-genuine components" (« cadrans contrefaits ou d’autres composants non authentiques »). Rolex further claims that some of the watches at issue were marketed as "100% authentic" or "certified pre-owned" Rolex watches despite allegedly failing to meet the manufacturer's quality standards.

The lawsuit concerns, among other products, Rolex watches customized through the addition of diamonds or other precious stones. Rolex alleges that some of these modified watches constitute counterfeit reproductions and that the practices attributed to Duguay and Bijoux Medusa could mislead consumers regarding the origin and actual quality of the products and damage the prestige associated with the Rolex brand.

Duguay and Bijoux Medusa dispute the allegations. In a statement, the company described the lawsuit as "unfounded" and a "vexatious proceeding" and maintained that all watches it sells are authentic. The company argues that adding diamonds or other elements to authentic watches constitutes legitimate customization.

Rolex is seeking, among other remedies, an order prohibiting the disputed use of its trademarks, the destruction of material found to unlawfully bear its marks, and damages. The allegations have not been adjudicated by the court.
