= Pyrrha Jewelry =

Jewellery design company

- Industry: Retail
- Headquarters: Vancouver, Canada
- Key people: Danielle Wilmore, (Founder/Designer); Wade Papin, (Founder/Designer)
- Products: Jewelry
- Website: www.pyrrha.com

Pyrrha Design is a jewelry design and manufacturing company based in Vancouver, British Columbia, Canada.

== Background ==
Pyrrha was founded by Wade Papin and Danielle Wilmore in 1995 in Vancouver, Canada. Pyrrha designs and creates sustainable jewelry based on antique wax seals and heraldic talismans.

The company name derives from Greek mythology, specifically from the story of Pyrrha and Deucalion.

In April 2010, Pyrrha opened its first retail store in Los Angeles, California.

Pyrrha Design is a member of the Responsible Jewelry Council and 1% for the planet.

== See also ==
- Bijoux Medusa
