= OpNet =

Italian telecommunications company

OpNet S.p.A.
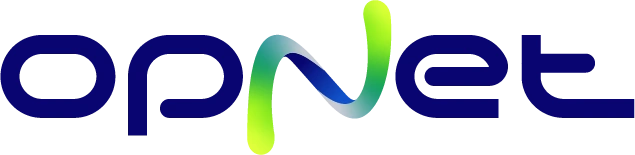
- Formerly: Megabeam Italia S.p.A. (2001-2005); Linkem S.p.A. (2005-2022)
- Company type: Subsidiary
- Industry: Telecommunications
- Founded: 2001; 25 years ago
- Founder: Davide Rota
- Headquarters: Rome, Italy
- Area served: Italy
- Key people: Davide Rota (CEO)
- Products: Fixed wireless access
- Owner: Wind Tre (100%)
- Parent: Wind Tre
- Website: www.opnet.it

OpNet S.p.A. (originally Megabeam Italia S.p.A., then Linkem S.p.A.) is an Italian telecommunications company specializing in wireless broadband connection (HiperLAN, WiMAX and Wi-Fi).

The company has a network of wholly owned subsidiaries with 1,200 antennas (BTS) located throughout Italy, providing Internet connectivity to surrounding areas. The Linkem network is an alternative to traditional telecommunications networks, allowing signal transmission to areas that lack cellular connectivity.

The firm was Italy's first Wireless Internet Service Provider, serving about 2,000 municipalities covering 40% of Italy's land area.

== History ==
The company was founded in 2001 as Megabeam Italia S.p.A. by Davide Rota and a group of managers supported by Angel Ventures Serviços de Consultoria S.A. of Gianfilippo Cuneo.

In 2003 Telecom Italia indicated interest in the acquisition of Megabeam for 11.5 million euros, but the Italian antitrust authorities required conditions the firm would not accept. Specifically, Telecom Italia would have had to separate Wi-Fi from all other services, give up all exclusive licenses held by itself as well as those held by Linkem, and grant competitors roaming access to the network, ending discriminatory pricing.

In 2003 the company changed its name to Linkem S.p.A.

In 2008, A.F.T. S.p.A. (Linkem's parent company) won the notice of allocation for WiMAX frequency bands 3.4-3.6 GHz, in 13 Italian regions with their offer of 34,420,000 euros. With its WiMAX service, Linkem reaches more than 80% of Italy's population - becoming the first Italian operator to launch a WiMAX-based voice and broadband service.

In 2010 Telecom Italia developed an agreement with Linkem for the rent of its WiMAX networks, offering free WiMAX in the regions where Linkem has its own network.

2015 marked the activation of LTE coverage on 3.5 GHz frequencies (Linkem proprietary frequencies) with a campaign to replace outdoor WiMAX antennas.

On 30 December 2021, Tiscali S.p.A. and Linkem S.p.A. approved the project for the merger by incorporation of Linkem Retail S.r.l. in Tiscali S.p.A. On 27 April 2022, the shareholders' meetings of Tiscali and Linkem approved the merger between the two companies.

On 1 August 2022, the two companies completed the merger process: Tiscali S.p.A. integrated Linkem Retail S.r.l., with the consequent transfer of the branch to the subsidiary Tiscali Italia S.p.A., while Linkem S.p.A. became the majority shareholder of Tiscali S.p.A. (58.60%).

In September 2022 the company changed its name again to OpNet S.p.A., deciding to focus on the wholesale market, while the Linkem brand still remains active under the control of Tiscali.

On February 2, 2024, Wind Tre signed an agreement for the acquisition of the assets, including the network infrastructure, of OpNet, which will be acquired 100% by Wind Tre together with all other subsidiaries, excluding Tessellis (formerly Tiscali). On August 1, the transaction was completed.

== Communication and sponsorships ==
- Testimonial 2012–2013 in planning national TV: Belén Rodríguez and Francesca Piccinini
- Technology partner FIPAV
- Title sponsor of the Italian club (Linkem Club Italy) 2009–2010
- Official sponsor of the 'Foggia Calcio for the Pro League championship 2010–2011
- Official sponsor Avezzano Rugby 2011–2012
- Official sponsor Messina Volleyball 2011–2012
- Official sponsor of the San Nicola stadium in Bari 2012–2013
- Official sponsor of the basketball team Linkem NPC Rieti 2012–2013
- Official sponsor PlayOff Volleyball male Serie A 2012–2013
