= Anthony Lacavera =

Canadian businessman and television host

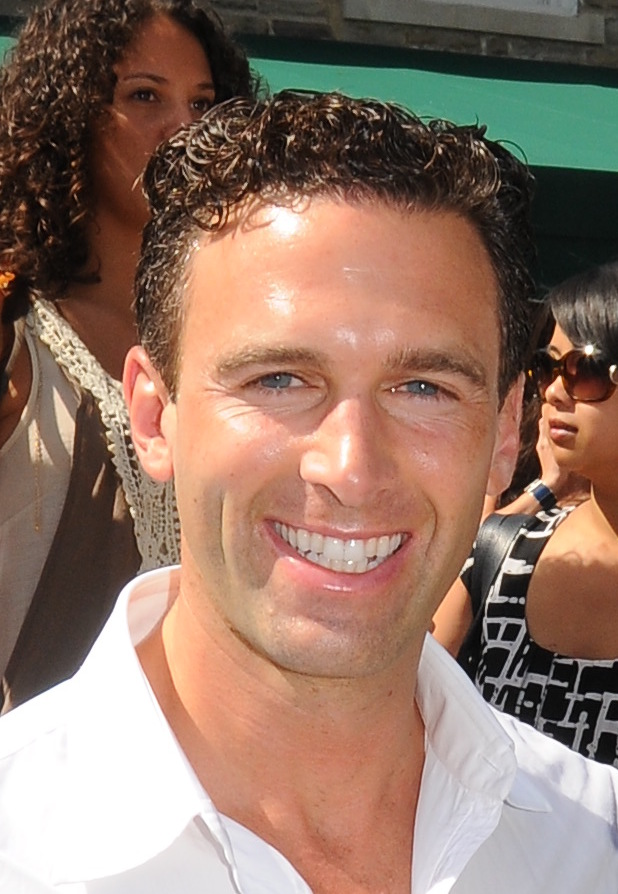
- Lacavera at the Canadian Film Centre (CFC), 2011
- Born: 1974 (age 51–52); Welland, Ontario
- Education: University of Toronto (1997)
- Occupations: Businessman, venture capitalist, television host
- Years active: 1998 - present
- Known for: Globalive (founder, chairman); Wind Mobile (founder)
- Notable work: Beyond Innovation

Anthony Lacavera is a Canadian businessman, venture capitalist, television host, and philanthropist. He is founder, chairman, and former CEO of Globalive, a Toronto-based telecommunications and investment company. He has also founded several other companies including Wind Mobile, a wireless service provider which was sold to Shaw Communications in 2016 for $1.6 billion.

He also started a media company, Globalive Media, which produces the television series Beyond Innovation that airs on Bloomberg TV globally. He has produced Cat on a Hot Tin Roof in 2008 which received Laurence Olivier Award for Best Revival in 2010. He has also produced A Streetcar Named Desire for Broadway.

== Early life and education ==
Lacavera was born in 1974 in Welland, Ontario. His father was a lawyer and a high school teacher.

He went to Notre Dame College School in Welland, and Neuchâtel Junior College in Neuchâtel, Switzerland until 1993. He went to University of Toronto and joined Applied Science and Engineering school and graduated in computer engineering in 1997. In 2012, he has also received an honorary diploma in "Business and Entrepreneurship" from the Niagara College.

He played Junior "B" ice hockey leagues in Welland and Thorold.

== Career ==
After graduation, Lacavera founded Globalive in 1998 with a $25,000 small business loan from the Royal Bank of Canada. Globalive is a telecommunications and investment company based in Toronto, Ontario.

The first operating company was Canopco, a communication company in the hospitality industry, supplying hotels and hospitals with a variety of services. In 1999, he founded InterClear, a billing and collection service and then in 2000, Assemble Conferencing. These are three companies were merged into each other and started calling Globalive Communications, which was later converted into Globalive.

In 2001, he co-founded Enunciate Conferencing with two partners, which was sold to Premiere Global Services for USD $28.3 million in 2006. In 2003, he founded OneConnect Services through his Globalive, to provide communications technologies to small and medium sized businesses.

Lacavera through his Globalive acquired Yak Communications for all-cash USD $67.7 million in 2006, a communications company founded in 1991 by Charles Zwebner.

In 2008, Globalive founded WIND Mobile, a wireless telecommunications provider, and Lacavera became the Founder CEO of the company. He also founded an investment firm, Globalive Capital Inc. In 2015, Lacavera stepped down as a CEO of Globalive Capital and appointed its previously chief financial officer, Brice Scheschuk as the new CEO.

He also started an augmented reality solutions company, a joint venture between Globalive and Gibraltar Ventures's XMG Studios, called Globalive XMG. Globalive XMG was later sold to the Los Angeles-based Civic Resource Group's CivicConnect.

Anthony closed a deal of $1.6 billion to sell WIND Mobile to Shaw Communications in March 2016, which Shaw renamed it to Freedom Mobile. The same year in September, Lacavera also sold his other three companies including the Yak Communications to Distributel, OneConnect Services and Canopco to Accelerated Connections Inc (ACI).

In March 2022, Lacavera showed an interest to reacquire Freedom/Wind from Shaw in a pending merger with Rogers Communications for C$3.75 billion to satisfy regulatory concerns. After an unresponsive behavior from Rogers, Lacavera's Globalive directly went to Shaw making the same offer to buy the company.

=== Theatre and other media ===
In 2008, Lacavera co-produced the all-African-American Broadway production of Tennessee Williams' Pulitzer Prize-winning drama Cat on a Hot Tin Roof, starring James Earl Jones, Phylicia Rashad, Anika Noni Rose, and Terrence Howard. The production, with some roles recast, had a limited run (2009 – April 2010) in London's West End Productions. It received Laurence Olivier Award for Best Revival in 2010.

He has also co-produced Broadway's A Streetcar Named Desire in 2012, another play by Williams. It was directed by Emily Mann, starring Blair Underwood, Nicole Ari Parker, Daphne Rubin-Vega, and Wood Harris.

He started a media company, Globalive Media, with journalist Michael Bancroft, produced and premiered its first television series, Beyond Innovation, a weekly technology and business related program, aired in November 2018 on Bloomberg TV globally. In March 2020, the second season of the half-hourly series premiered on Bloomberg.

== Philanthropy ==
In 2012, Lacavera started "Lacavera Prize" in partnership with The Entrepreneurship Hatchery at the University of Toronto, to help university students looking to start an entrepreneurial venture. Kepler Communications is one of successful telecommunications companies which won the prize and founded in 2015 by the University's four graduate students.

He is director and co-chair of NEXT Canada, a non-profit organization. He is also a founding partner of the Creative Destruction Lab, a nonprofit organization, with five locations at different educational institutes in Canada and the United States.

== Books ==
- How We Can Win: And What Happens to Us and Our Country If We Don't (Penguin Random House Canada, 2017) – ISBN 073527259X, 9780735272590

== Awards and honors ==
- Anthony Lacavera was among the Canada's Top 40 Under 40 list in 2005.
- He was named CEO of the Year in Canada in 2010 by The Globe and Mail.
- He was named an Honorary Fellow of St. Michael’s College at the University of Toronto in 2012.
- He received an honorary diploma in "Business and Entrepreneurship" from the Niagara College.
- He received Order of the Star of Italian Solidarity (Commander) from the Government of Italy in 2012.
- He was named to the University of Toronto's Engineering Hall of Distinction in 2013.
