= Tessellis =

Italian telecommunications company

Tessellis S.p.A.

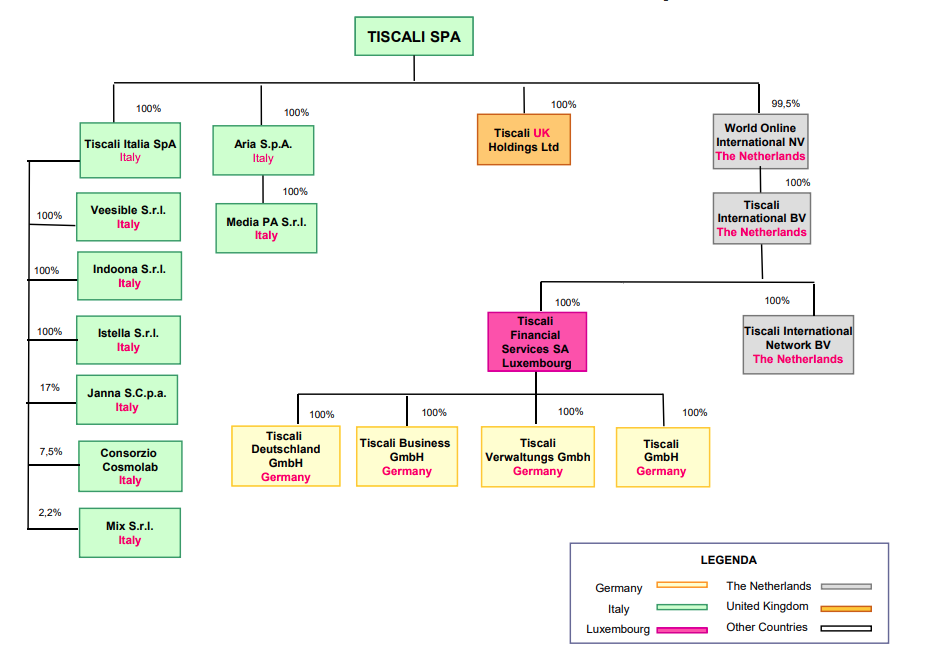
- Tiscali group structure.
- Formerly: Tiscali S.p.A. (1998-2023)
- Type: Public
- Traded as: BIT: TSL
- ISIN: IT0005496473
- Industry: Telecommunications
- Founded: January 1998; 28 years ago
- Founder: Renato Soru
- Headquarters: Tiscali Campus, Sa Illetta, Cagliari, Italy
- Area served: Italy
- Key people: Renato Soru (founder), Stefano Zacutti (CEO)
- Products: Telephony; Broadband Internet; IT Services
- Revenue: 165,200,000 euro (2018)
- Net income: 83,200,000 euro (2018)
- Owner: ShellNet (56.54%); Market (43.36%)
- Number of employees: 1,145 (2018)
- Parent: Jefferies Financial Group
- Subsidiaries: Tiscali Italia (100%)
- Website: www.tessellis.it

Tessellis S.p.A. (formerly Tiscali S.p.A.) is an Italian telecommunications company founded in 1998 and based in Cagliari, Sardinia, that provides Internet and telecommunications services in Italy, and, previously had operations in other European nations through its acquisition of many smaller European Internet service providers (ISPs) in the late 1990s.

Since 2022, following the Tiscali–Linkem merger, the company has acquired full control of the retail services previously provided by Linkem (now OpNet), including the brand.

== History ==
Tiscali S.p.A. was created in January 1998 in Cagliari by Renato Soru, following the deregulation of Italian telephone system. The company owes its name to a Sardinian mountain at which remains of an ancient village were found.

In 1999 the subsidiary Tiscali Italia S.p.A. was founded.

From March 1999 onward, Tiscali offered "Tiscali Free Net", a subscription-free Internet service where customers only had to pay for the time they were online. This pushed other Italian providers to repeal their fixed subscription fees, thus contributing to making the Internet accessible to the masses in Italy.

In November 1999 Tiscali, Franco Bernabè and Sanpaolo IMI founded Andala, which in 2000 was acquired by Hutchison Whampoa and won the tender for the award of 3G (UMTS) licenses.

Between 2001 and 2005, shares were also traded on the French Stock Exchange. It was delisted from Paris Stock Exchange at the end of December 2005.

On 25 March 2009 Tiscali launches Tiscali Mobile, an ESP MVNO on the TIM network.

In 2012 three subsidiaries were founded:

- Veesible S.r.l.: dealer for the sale of advertising space;
- indoona S.r.l.: company aimed at developing the IM application of the same name;
- istella S.r.l.: company aimed at developing the search engine of the same name.

On 30 December 2021, Tiscali S.p.A. and Linkem S.p.A. approved the project for the merger by incorporation of Linkem Retail S.r.l. in Tiscali S.p.A.

On 27 April 2022, the shareholders' meetings of Tiscali and Linkem approved the merger between the two companies.

On 1 August 2022, the two companies completed the merger process: Tiscali S.p.A. integrated Linkem Retail S.r.l., with the consequent transfer of the branch to the subsidiary Tiscali Italia S.p.A., while Linkem S.p.A. (now OpNet S.p.A.) became the majority shareholder of Tiscali S.p.A. (58.60%).

After announcing it in October 2022, on 19 January 2023 the name of the parent company became Tessellis S.p.A., which will continue to operate under both the commercial brands Tiscali and Linkem.

On 2 February 2024, Wind Tre signed an agreement for the acquisition of the assets, including the network infrastructure, of OpNet, which will be acquired 100% by Wind Tre together with all other subsidiaries, excluding Tessellis. On 1 August, the transaction was completed.

Logo of Tiscali between 2003 and 2009

=== Operations ===
Beginning in 2004, Tiscali S.p.A. has carried out various purchase, sale and merger actions

- On 16 August 2004, sold its Austrian branch, Tiscali Österreich GmbH, to Nextra Telecom GmbH.
- On 20 August 2004, sold its South African branch, Tiscali (Pty) Ltd, to MWEB Holdings (Pty) Ltd.
- On 23 August 2004, sold its Norwegian branch, Tiscali AS, to Telenor Telecom Solutions AS.
- On 30 August 2004, sold its Swedish counterpart, Tiscali AB, to Spray Network AB, then a subsidiary of Lycos, Inc.
- On 16 September 2004, sold its Swiss counterpart, Tiscali AG, reaching an agreement with Smart Telecom Plc.
- On 19 October 2004, sold its South African mobile telephone network, Tiscali Mobile, to Vodacom S.A.
- On 29 November 2004, sold its Luxembourg subsidiary, Tiscali S.A., reaching an agreement with Alternet S.A.
- On 29 November 2004, sold its Belgian subsidiary, Tiscali N.V, reaching an agreement with Scarlet België SA.
- On 1 February 2005, sold its Danish company, Tiscali Denmark A/S, to Tele2 AB.
- On 5 May 2005, sold the French ISP, Liberty Surf Group SAS to Telecom Italia S.p.A.
- On 31 January 2007, sold its German business to consumer activities to Freenet.de AG, at a sum of €30 million. It later sold its business-to-business transactions on 5 February 2007 to Ecotel Communication AG, with future intentions to leave the German market altogether.
- On 19 June 2007, sold its Dutch branch, Tiscali B.V., to Royal KPN N.V.
- On 11 October 2006, announced that it was to focus on the UK and Italy as its prime ISP targets, with plans to introduce new services to them including a mobile network operator and new IPTV products to the United Kingdom by its acquisition of HomeChoice.
- On 31 December 2008, shut down its IPTV service in Italy.
- On 27 May 2009, sold its International arm, Tinet B.V. to BS Private Equity S.p.A. firm.
- On 30 June 2009, sold its UK subsidiary to Carphone Warehouse following regulatory approval from the European Union. The service was rebranded as TalkTalk in January 2010.
- By 16 February 2016, completed its merger with Aria S.p.A., an Italian WiMAX provider.
- On 1 August 2022, completed its merger with the retail branch of Linkem S.p.A.
- On 19 January 2023, Tiscali S.p.A. changed its name to Tessellis S.p.A.

== Services ==
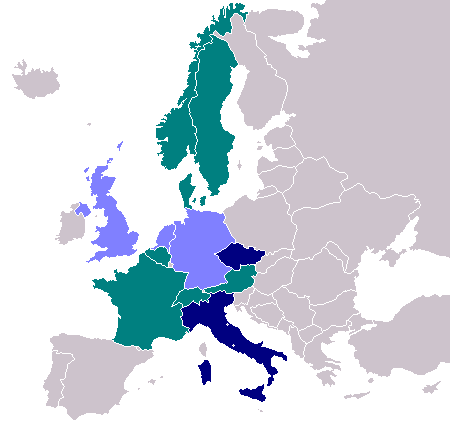
Tiscali Europe

Each of Tiscali's regional companies offer many services, which may include broadband Internet access and telephone services. Between 2007 and 2008, Tiscali briefly operated an IPTV service in Italy, Tiscali TV, available in the cities of Bologna, Cagliari, Florence, Genoa, Milan, Naples, Palermo, Rome, Turin and Trieste. Its UK television service, Tiscali TV was acquired by TalkTalk in 2009.

Tiscali's former carrier company, Tiscali International Network, was a pure play carrier business delivering wholesale services including Global IP Connectivity, MPLS lines, VoIP and network monitoring. In May 2009, its IP/MPLS backbone counted 90 Points of Presence and extended over 17 European countries and across the United States and Hong Kong. Its autonomous system (AS3257) was a core ASN in the global Internet routing table, as well as the largest IPv6 backbone outside Asia. The network was sold to the Italian private equity firm BS Private Equity on 27 May 2009, and renamed Tinet.

Tiscali ran similar Web portals for each of its countries, which include features such as Webmail, reviews, news, videos, dating, chat, radio, TV guide, streaming TV channels and others.

Tiscali published a self-branded Web browser of the same name which was distributed with its dial-up Internet packages. The browser used the core of Microsoft's Internet Explorer browser to display web pages. Distribution of the software ended during Tiscali's corporate rebranding in 2004.

Tiscali offered dial-up Internet access in Finland under service name Surfeu.

Tiscali Campus in Cagliari had 1,000 employees as of early 2013. The center includes a development division for Internet technologies. Researchers working there included Antonio Tuzzi (one of the developers of Apple's macOS), Luca Manunza (inventor of the first Webmail service), and Domenico Dato (developer of Arianna, the first Italian search engine).

== Tiscali Campus ==
Tiscali Campus
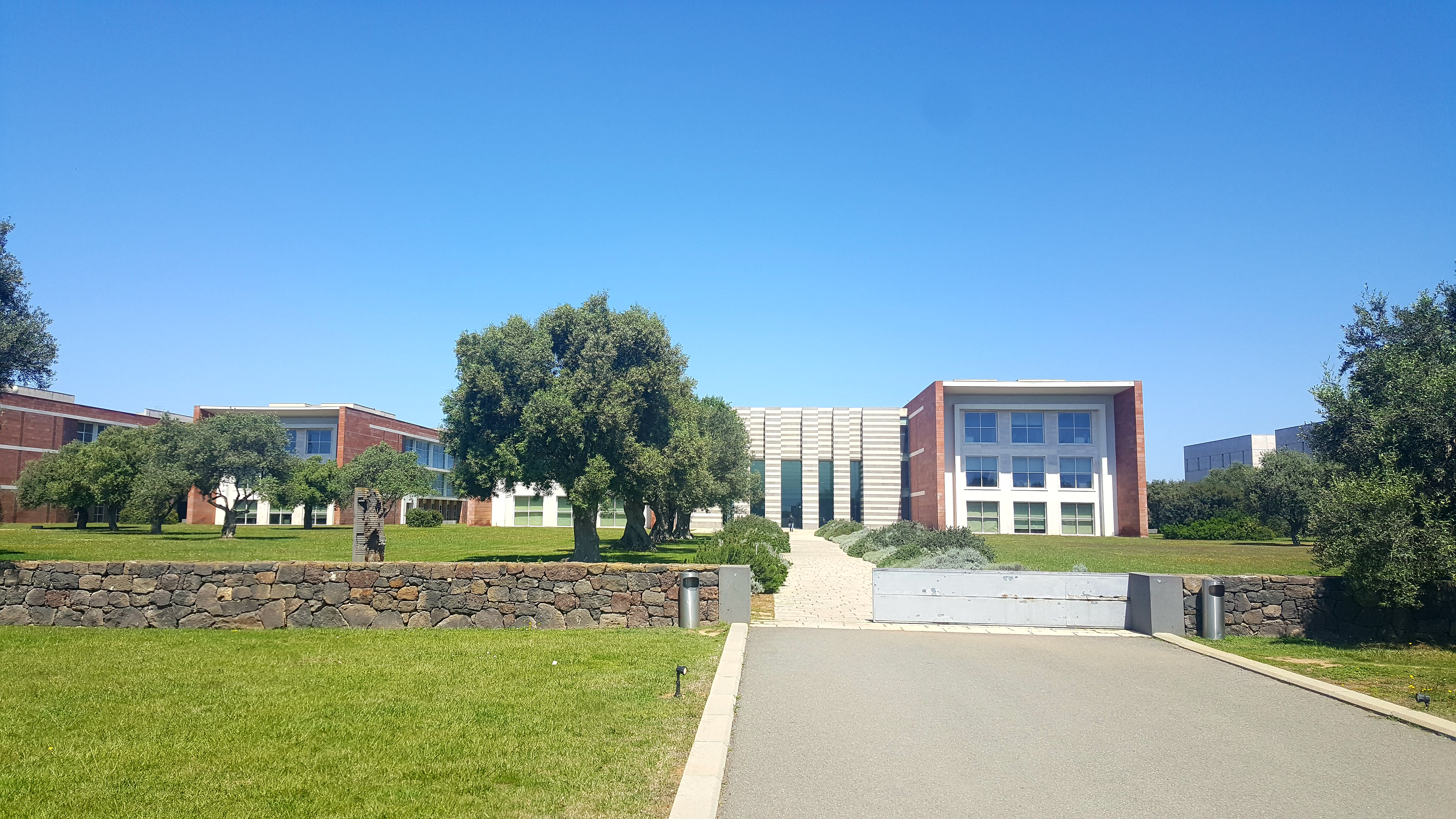

General information
- Status: Completed
- Location: Sa Illetta, Strada Statale 195 Sulcitana km 2,3, 09123 Cagliari CA, Cagliari, Italy
- Coordinates: 39°13′40.1″N 9°4′10.8″E
- Inaugurated: 19 September 2003
- Owner: Tiscali

Technical details
- Floor count: 3

Design and construction
- Architect: Arassociati

Website
- www.tiscali.com/en/tiscali-campus/

The Tiscali Campus is the headquarters of Tiscali.

Designed by the Arassociati studio, the campus is a work of contemporary architecture in Cagliari and an example of public art in Italy.

It is located in the area of Sa Illetta, which was once a small island reachable only by boat, between the Cagliari pond and the State Road 195 "Sulcitana", an important artery of Southern Sardinia. Nearby is the church of San Simone, a riding school, the Ballero farm and the Porto Canale.

== See also ==
- Tiscali Campus
- Tiscali Italia
- Tiscali International Network
- Tiscali Mobile
- Tiscali TV (Italy)
- Tiscali TV (UK)
- Tiscali UK
