= Stacey Allaster =

Canadian-American businesswoman

Stacey Ann Allaster CC

Chief Executive of Professional Tennis of the United States Tennis Association
- In office April 2016 – September 2025

Chairperson and CEO of the Women's Tennis Association
- In office July 13, 2009 – October 2, 2015
- Preceded by: Larry Scott
- Succeeded by: Steve Simon

President of the Women's Tennis Association
- In office January 1, 2006 – July 13, 2009
- Succeeded by: Micky Lawler

Personal details
- Born: July 12, 1963 (age 63) Windsor, Ontario, Canada
- Citizenship: Canada • United States
- Spouse: John Milkovich
- Children: 2
- Education: University of Western Ontario (BA); Richard Ivey School of Business (MBA)

Stacey Ann Allaster CC (born July 12, 1963) is a Canadian-American businesswoman. With the United States Tennis Association, she has been chief executive of Professional Tennis since 2016 and US Open Tournament Director since 2020. Previously, she was chairperson and CEO of the Women's Tennis Association from 2009 to 2015.

== Early life ==
Allaster was born in Windsor, Ontario, and grew up in Welland, Ontario. She started playing tennis at age 12. She attended Notre Dame College School and received her Bachelor of Arts in Economics and Physical Education from the University of Western Ontario in 1985 and a Master of Business Administration from the Richard Ivey School of Business in 2000.

== Career ==
Allaster was a member of the Welland Tennis Club, where she learned how to play tennis. She also taught tennis to children and adults. After graduating from university, she worked for the Ontario Tennis Association as membership sales coordinator and director of player development.

She became the vice president of sales and marketing and tournament director of the Rogers Cup. On January 1, 2006, she was appointed to be the president of Women's Tennis Association, a newly created role in the organization.

In July 2009, Allaster was promoted to be the chairperson and CEO of the WTA Tour, succeeding Larry Scott.

In 2011, the WTA Board of Directors extended Allaster's CEO contract through 2017.

While CEO, the WTA secured $1 billion in diversified contracted revenues. Allaster also oversaw the partnership of an international media agreement.

On September 22, 2015, Allaster announced her retirement as chief executive of the WTA, citing a personal change in priorities. The transition took effect October 2, 2015. On October 5, 2015, Steve Simon, the tournament director of the BNP Paribas Open, was announced to succeed Allaster as the new WTA chairman and CEO.

In September 2025, Allaster stepped down from her position as US Open Tournament Director with Eric Butorac taking on the role.

== Personal life ==
Allaster resides in St. Petersburg, Florida, with her husband, John Milkovich and their children, Jack and Alexandra, adopted from Kemerovo, Russia.
