= Wind Tre =

Italian telecommunications company

Wind Tre S.p.A.

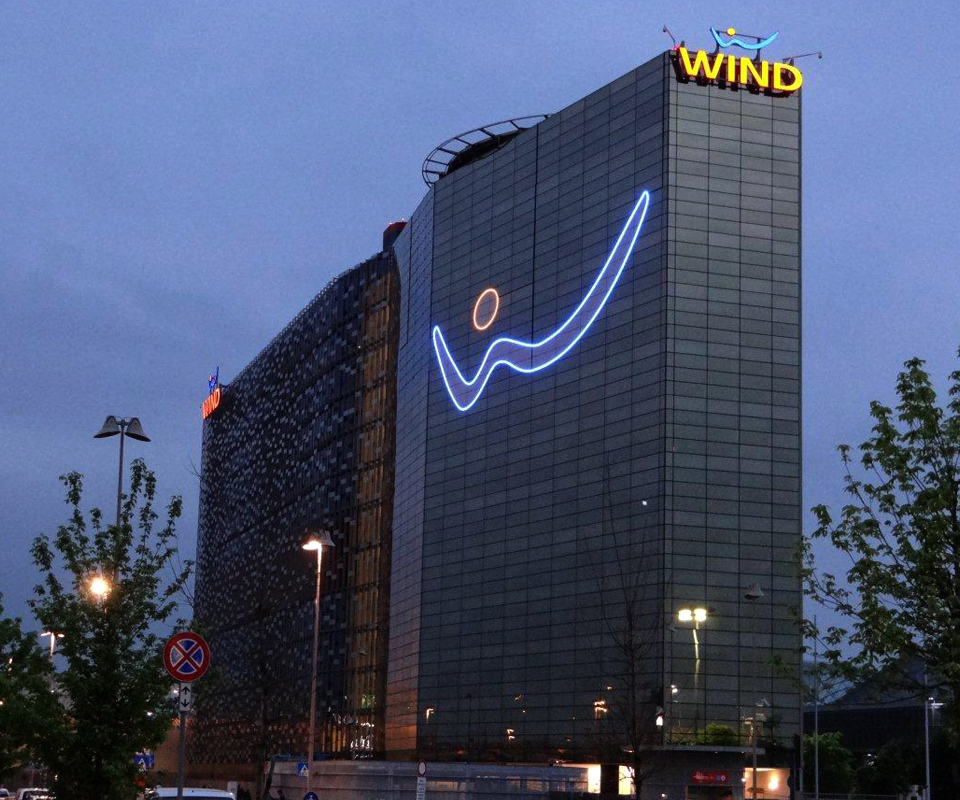
- Wind Tre headquarters in Rho, Lombardy, Italy
- Type: Subsidiary
- Industry: Telecommunications
- Predecessor: 3 Italy; Wind Telecomunicazioni
- Founded: 31 December 2016; 9 years ago in Rho, Lombardy, Italy
- Founder: CK Hutchison Holdings; VimpelCom
- Headquarters: Milan, Italy
- Area served: Italy
- Key people: Jeffrey Hedberg (CEO)
- Products: Mobile telephony, fixed-line telephony, Broadband Internet, IT Services, IPTV
- Brands: Very Mobile
- Revenue: € 6,182,000,000 (2017)
- Net income: € −2,620,000,000 (2017)
- Parent: CK Hutchison Holdings
- Subsidiaries: Zefiro Net (50%); OpNet (100%)
- Website: www.windtre.it

Wind Tre S.p.A., stylized as WINDTRE, is an Italian telecommunications company owned by CK Hutchison Holdings, which offers mobile and fixed-line telephony services.

It was born on 31 December 2016 from the merger of two Italian telecommunications companies, namely 3 Italy and Wind Telecomunicazioni, controlled respectively by CK Hutchison Holdings and VimpelCom.

Since 7 September 2018, CK Hutchison Holdings has been the sole shareholder of Wind Tre as, following approval by the European Commission, the Hong Kong group completed the acquisition of the remaining 50% of the company from VEON (formerly VimpelCom).

As of 2022, it is the first Italian mobile operator for SIM HUMAN, third instead after TIM and Vodafone in total active cards.

== History ==
Wind-3 networks unification

On 31 December 2016, the project to create an equal joint venture between CK Hutchison Holdings, owner of 3 Italy, and VimpelCom, owner of Wind Telecomunicazioni, was completed. The project envisaged the merger of 3 Italy and Wind into Wind Tre.

On 7 September 2018, VEON (formerly VimpelCom) sold its 50% stake in Wind Tre to CK Hutchison Holdings, which thus became the sole shareholder.

Despite the merger, the company kept the Wind, 3 Italy and Infostrada brands active (with the exception of Wind Business and 3 Business which became Wind Tre Business on 23 May 2017) until 16 March 2020, when the company started a process of rebranding that led to the birth of the unified brands Wind Tre, Wind Tre Business and Very Mobile (born on 24 February 2020, as a Mobile Virtual Network Operator to compete with Iliad, ho-mobile and Kena Mobile). Very Mobile was the first MVNO to market its offers also on eSIM and to experiment with VoLTE and VoWiFi technologies.

As of August 2022, the company has obtained authorization from AGCOM to start a collaboration with Iliad for 5G sharing in rural areas with low population density. In January 2023, the creation of the Zefiro Net joint venture, jointly controlled by the two companies, was completed.

On 2 February 2024, Wind Tre signed an agreement for the acquisition of the assets, including the network infrastructure, of OpNet (formerly Linkem), which will be acquired 100% by Wind Tre together with all other subsidiaries, excluding Tessellis (formerly Tiscali). On 1 August, the transaction was completed.

== Brands and logos ==
=== Wind Tre ===
2016–2020

2020–present

=== Wind Tre Business ===
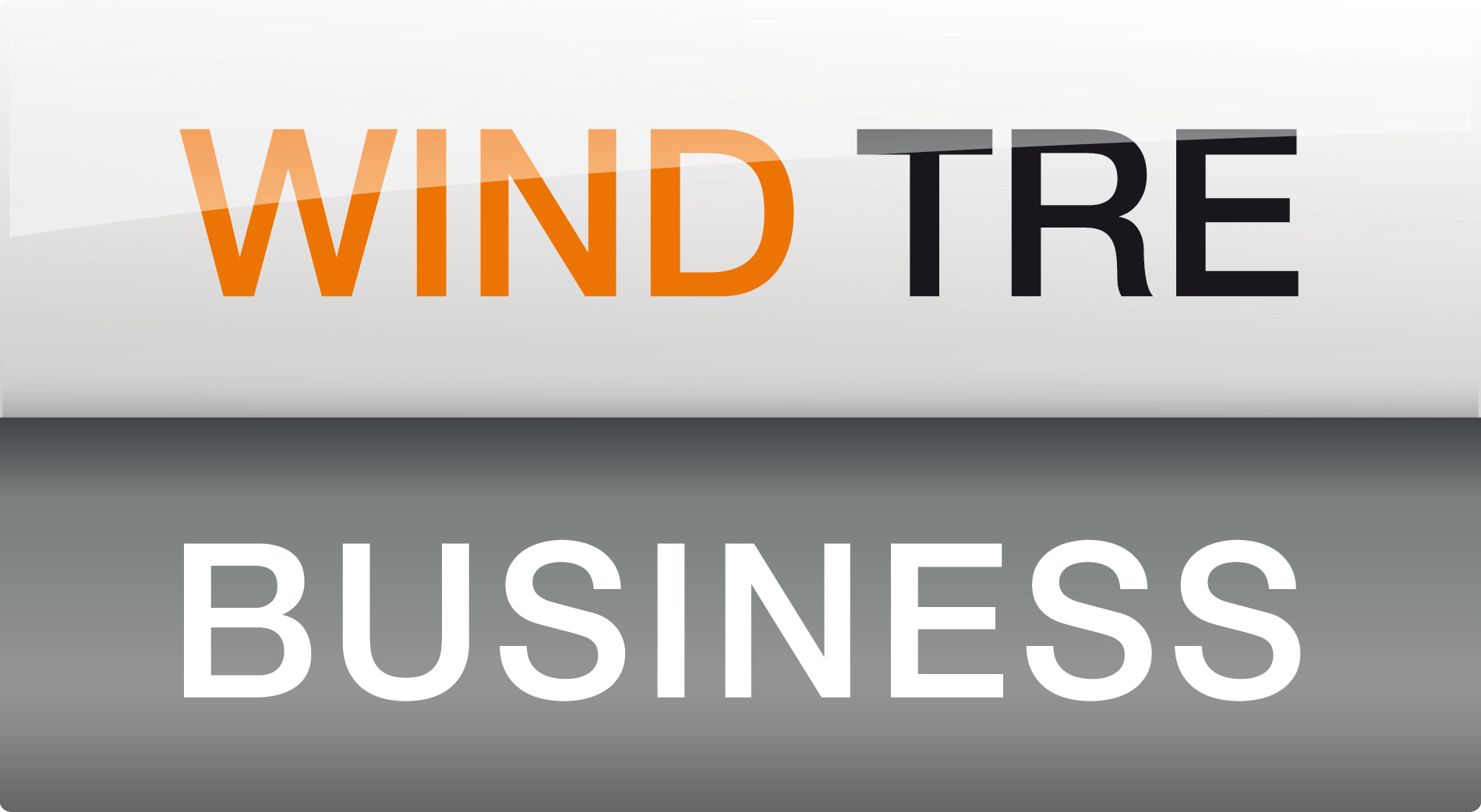
2017–2020

2020–present

=== Very Mobile ===
2020–present

=== Discontinued ===
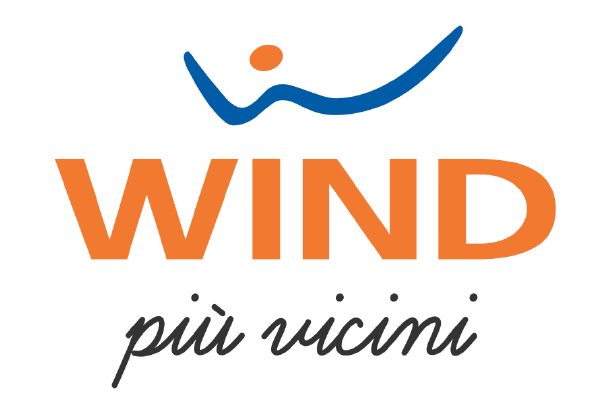
Wind

3 Italy

Infostrada

== Shareholder structure ==
The Wind Tre group is structured as follows:

CK Hutchison Holdings Limited
CK Hutchison Group Telecom Italy Investments S.à r.l. 100%
Wind Tre Italia S.p.A. 100%
Wind Tre S.p.A. 100%
Wind Retail S.r.l. 100%	3Lettronica Industriale S.p.A. 100%

== See also ==
- List of mobile network operators in Italy
- 3 Italy
- CK Hutchison Holdings
- Infostrada
- Very Mobile
- VimpelCom
- Wind Telecomunicazioni
