= Globalive =

Canadian communications company

Globalive Capital Inc.
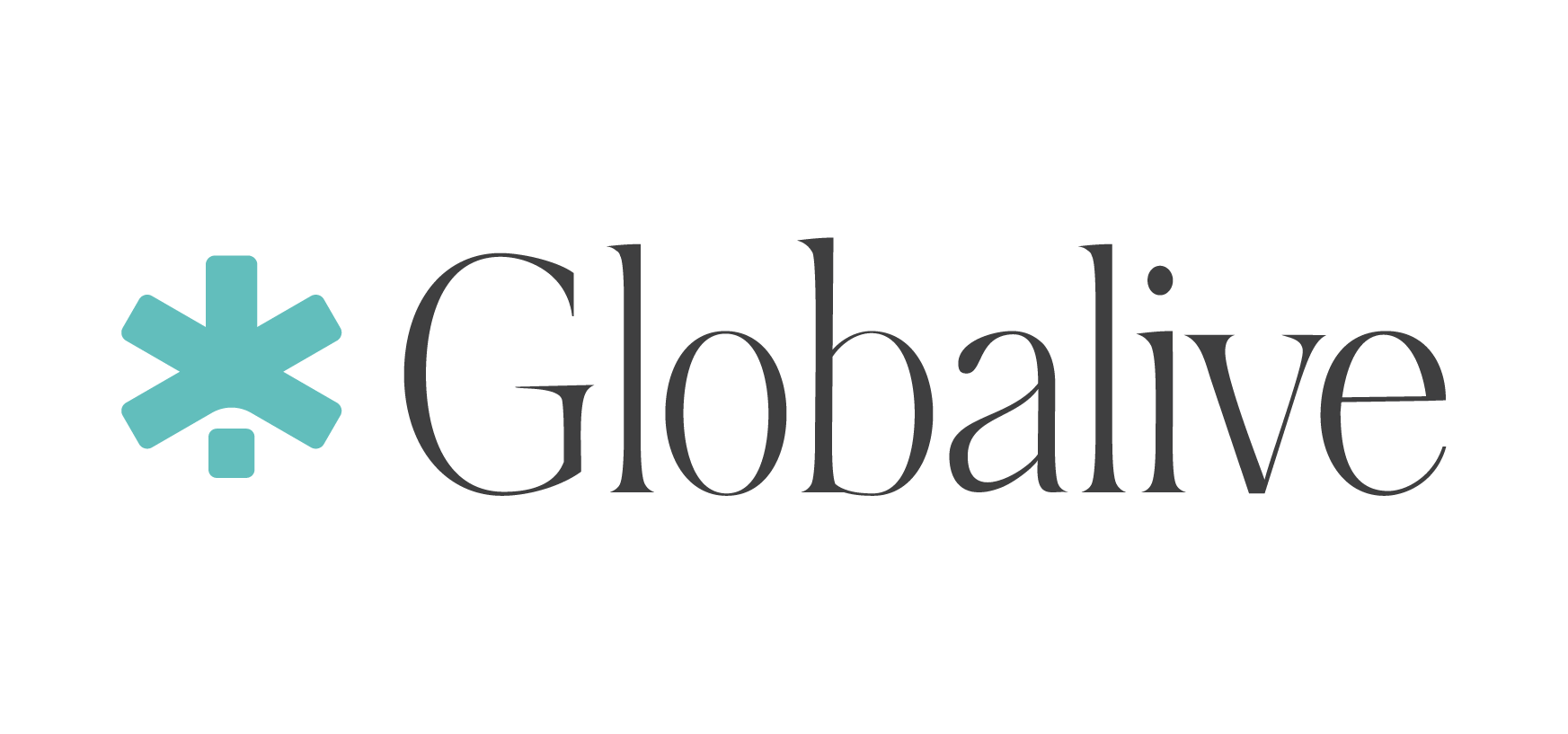
- Type: Private
- Industry: Telecommunications
- Founded: 1998; 28 years ago
- Founder: Anthony Lacavera
- Headquarters: Toronto, Ontario, Canada
- Area served: Canada and United States
- Key people: Anthony Lacavera (founder and chairman); Brice Scheschuk (CEO)
- Subsidiaries: Globalive Capital; Globalive Ventures; Globalive Media
- Website: globalive.com

Globalive Capital Inc. is a Canadian telecommunications and investment company founded in 1998. It is based in Toronto, Ontario. Globalive is best known for its telecommunication businesses like Freedom Mobile (formerly known as Wind Mobile), Yak Communications, and OneConnect.

The company, Globalive Inc., was founded in 1998, investing in businesses, primarily in technology, media, and telecommunications companies based in Canada and the United States. It holds investments in over 125 private companies including Stackadapt, Zoocasa, and Xanado.

== History ==
=== 1998–2007 ===
Globalive Communications

Anthony Lacavera started Canopco in 1998, a communication company in the hospitality industry. In January 2000, Lacavera also launched InterClear, a billing and collection service. In January 2002, Lacavera launched his third product, Assemble Conferencing. All three businesses were consolidated in January 2003 as Globalive Communications.

Enunciate Conferencing

Globalive co-founded Enunciate Conferencing in 2000, a fast-growing event conferencing service provider, which was divested to Premiere Global Services.

OneConnect logo

OneConnect

Globalive founded OneConnect in 2003, which became one of Canada's largest independent business telecommunications providers, selling to small and medium-sized businesses in the hospitality, retail, franchise, security, real estate and medical industries.

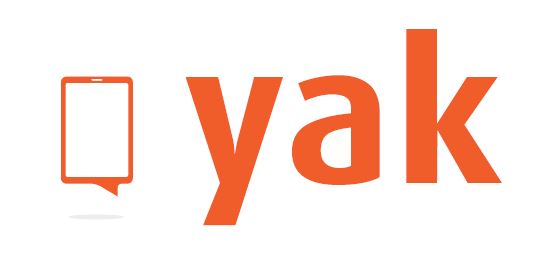
Yak Communications logo

Yak Communications

In 2006, Globalive acquired Yak Communications Inc. in an all-cash offer of US$67.7 million, and has since grown the company to a leadership position in residential communications services, adding Digital Home Phone and internet service to its established long-distance calling services.

Pragmatic

Globalive co-founded Pragmatic Solutions in 2007, a conferencing and collaborations company specializing in audio, web, and video conferencing. Pragmatic has grown into one of North America's conferencing providers, with $7.5 million in annual revenue.

=== 2008–present ===
WIND Mobile

Globalive founded WIND Mobile in 2008. WIND Mobile made a bid of $442m (CAD) to secure the wireless spectrum required for the launch of the WIND Mobile network in Canada, with the backing of Egypt's Orascom Telecom. Globalive subsequently made its first purchase in Industry Canadian radio spectrum auction, setting the stage for a new national cell phone network in Canada.

WIND Mobile successfully launched wireless phone services in December 2009 in Toronto and Calgary. It launched service in Edmonton and Ottawa soon after, followed by Vancouver in June 2010

In September 2014, Globalive agreed to acquire Vimplecom's majority stake in WIND Mobile for $300 million (CAD).

Wind Mobile was sold to Shaw Communications in March 2016 for C$1.6 billion and was rebranded to Freedom Mobile. However, in March 2022, Globalive has intended to reacquire Freedom/Wind from Shaw in a pending merger with Rogers Communications for C$3.75 billion to satisfy regulatory concerns. Later it was announced that after an unresponsive behavior from Rogers, Globalive has directly gone to Shaw making the same offer to acquire the wireless carrier.

Globalive/Globalive Capital Inc.

In January 2013, Globalive launched Globalive Capital Inc., a venture capital company focused on accelerating early stage technology and telecommunications companies. Globalive group has founded, financed, operated, and divested a number of companies on the internet, communications, and technology sectors.

In 2015, Lacavera stepped down as chief executive officer of Globalive Capital Inc., staying on as the company's Chairman. Brice Scheschuk, previously chief financial officer, was appointed the new CEO of Globalive Capital Inc.

In September 2016, Globalive sold Yak Communications to Distributel, who added the brand to a growing telecommunications portfolio which includes Acanac and Thinktel.

Globalive Capital Inc. has invested in over 125 companies. The company has raised over US$1.5 Billion in capital for Globalive businesses and some of its investments include Stackadapt, Zoocasa, and Founding Investor in Xanado.

In June 2025, Globalive acquired all issued and outstanding shares of Wealth One.

== Globalive Media ==
Globalive Media was co-founded by Lacavera and consumer technology journalist Michael Bancroft in October 2017 under Globalive. It curates and produces multimedia content focused on business and technology trends.

In November 2018, Globalive Media produced and premiered its first television series, Beyond Innovation, a weekly program, which uncovers technologies changing the way people live and do business, airs on Bloomberg Television across its global markets.

In March 2020, Globalive Media launched the second season of the series Beyond Innovation with all new episodes of its weekly, half-hour series premiering on Bloomberg Television.
