= MEI Academy =

International education company

MEI Academy World High School
- Type: High School
- Industry: Education
- Founded: 1997
- Founder: Joe Mei
- Headquarters: Ontario, Canada
- Website: www.meiacademy.com

MEI Academy (abbreviated as MEI) is a study abroad organization that specializes in experiential learning, academic coursework, and educational travel. Founded in 1997 by Joe and Rita Mei, the company aims to offer a global high school experience.

== Programs ==
MEI operates over study abroad programs across six continents: Asia, Europe, South America, North America, Africa, and Australia. All programs are designed for high school and gap year students, and are organized by a summer term throughout Europe, Tanzania and Costa Rica, a Fall semester that travels through Europe, and a Spring semester that travels through Asia. The Summer term programs are typically between 4–6 weeks in duration, and offer 1 or 2 high school credits. The Semesters are much longer but offer 3 high school credits. The Fall semester is 70 days, where the Spring Semester is 50 days in total travel time. Important to nots is that there is also 2 weeks of foundation classes that are conducted online, and then 2 weeks of final exams and project presentations after the return home.

== Notable courses ==
MEI Academy offers academic credits. The MEI head office is located in Caledon, Ontario, Canada. Although MEI Academy is regulated by the Ontario Ministry of Education, MEI also accepts international students. Students from schools outside of Ontario may have academic courses accredited by their individual schools or local school boards. Course credits from MEI appear on student academic records and can be used for university entrance. MEI offers a mix of subjects and programs that have a 9:1 student/staff ratio. No dedicated classrooms are used as lectures are delivered on location. Courses offered vary from program to program, and include Ancient and Modern World History, Geography, Phys-ed, International Business, Modern Media and Photography, and Writer’s Craft.

== See also ==
- EF Education
- Neuchâtel Junior College
- Blyth Education
