= Canadian Jewellers Association =

Canadian trade association

Coordinates: 43.65255°N 79.3777°W

The Canadian Jewellers Association (CJA) is a trade association for the jewellery industry in Canada.

The headquarters of the Association is located in Toronto, Ontario, Canada. The Office Manager of the CJA is Carla Adams.

== Mission ==
The CJA aims both to support the Canadian jewellery and watch industry, through advocacy and membership benefits, as well as protect consumers, through a mandatory member adherence to a Code of Ethics.

== Overview ==
CJA is the national trade association for the Canadian jewellery industry, and has a strong history dating back to 1918. The Association is the voice of the Canadian jewellery and watch industry, and represents over 1,000 member locations consisting of retailers, suppliers and wholesalers, appraisers, designers, and goldsmiths across Canada, and provides leadership in ethics, education and communication. It also provides a Crime Prevention Program for its members which is partnered with Jewellers Mutual Insurance Group.
