= Freedom Mobile =

Canadian wireless service provider

Freedom Mobile Inc.
- Formerly: Wind Mobile Corp. (2009-2016)
- Type: Subsidiary
- Industry: Telecommunications
- Founder: Anthony Lacavera
- Headquarters: Toronto, Ontario, Canada
- Area served: Canada
- Key people: Pierre Karl Péladeau (CEO of Vidéotron and Québecor); Paul McAleese (COO); Jean-François Lescadres (CFO); Jean B. Péladeau (CMO)
- Products: Mobile Services; Cable Internet; IPTV
- Number of employees: 12,000 (2023, including Québecor)
- Parent: Globalive (2008-2016); Shaw Communications (2016-2023); Vidéotron (2023-present)
- Website: www.freedommobile.ca

Freedom Mobile (formerly Wind Mobile) is a Canadian wireless telecommunications provider owned by Québecor. As of November 30, 2022 it is the fourth-largest wireless carrier in the country with 2,290,497 subscribers and a 6% market share, primarily concentrated in urban areas of Ontario, British Columbia, Alberta, and Manitoba. In addition to mobile phone plans, Freedom also offers home internet and TV services.

Founded in 2008 by the telecommunications provider Globalive, Wind Mobile was one of several new carriers launched that year under a Canadian government initiative to foster competition in the wireless sector. Alongside Mobilicity (later acquired by Rogers Communications) and Public Mobile (later acquired by Telus Communications), Wind Mobile initially introduced mobile data and voice services in Toronto, Ontario, on December 16, 2009, and Calgary, Alberta, on December 18, 2009.

In 2016, Shaw Communications acquired Wind Mobile, and subsequently rebranded it as Freedom Mobile. On June 17, 2022, Shaw Communications, Rogers Communications, and Québecor announced an agreement for the sale of Freedom Mobile to Vidéotron, a subsidiary of Québecor, pending approval from the Competition Bureau and the Minister of Innovation, Science and Economic Development. The sale received approval on March 31, 2023, and was finalized on April 3, 2023.

== History ==
=== 2008: Wind Mobile founded ===
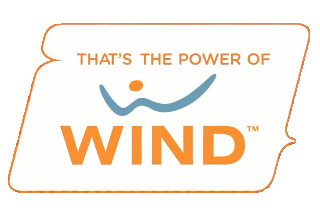
Former Wind Mobile logo (2009-2016)

In 2008, Globalive bid CAD $442 million to secure 3G spectrum at 1,700 MHz needed to launch Wind Mobile's network. Globalive, a Canadian telecommunications company, was primarily financed by the Egyptian corporation Orascom Telecom Holding and managed by Wind Telecom, which owns several other Wind-branded telecommunications companies. Ken Campbell, a former executive at Vodafone and Orascom, was appointed the first CEO of Globalive Wireless in 2008. However, the company's launch was delayed due to a public ownership review by the Canadian Radio-television and Telecommunications Commission (CRTC), which found that Globalive did not meet Canadian ownership requirements, citing its reliance on Orascom for CAD $508 million in debt.

=== 2009: Network launch ===
On December 11, the Governor-in-Council, acting on the advice of then Minister of Industry Tony Clement, issued a final decision deeming that Globalive met the ownership requirements, allowing it to enter the Canadian market immediately.

On December 14, Wind Mobile announced a partnership with Blockbuster in Canada, establishing Wind kiosks and offering prepaid products at 16 Blockbuster locations—13 in Ontario and 3 in Calgary.

On December 16, Wind Mobile officially launched its mobile service in Toronto, hosting a launch event at its Queens Quay store in downtown Toronto. Two days later, on December 18, Wind Mobile expanded its service to Calgary, Alberta.

=== 2010: Expansion and 100,000 subscribers ===
On March 4, 2010, Chris Robbins, Chief Customer Officer, resigned from Wind Mobile. While both Robbins and the company stated that the departure was due to strategic changes and his desire to pursue other business opportunities, analysts speculated that an executive departure so early suggested disappointing market penetration.

Wind Mobile continued its expansion, launching in Edmonton on February 25, Ottawa on March 26, and Vancouver on June 3.

By early July 2010, Wind Mobile had reached 100,000 subscribers.

=== 2011: Orascom sells to VimpelCom ===
On February 4, 2011, the Federal Court ruled in favour of competitors Public Mobile and Telus, declaring the Governor-in-Council's decision regarding Wind's Canadian ownership requirements improper. On May 18, the Federal Court of Appeal heard arguments from Wind and the federal government to overturn the Federal Court decision. The appeal was successful, and the Federal Court of Appeal restored the Governor-in-Council's order, affirming Wind met Canadian ownership requirements.

On March 17, shareholders of the Russian mobile operator VimpelCom supported a $6 billion deal to acquire Wind Telecom, which included Orascom Telecom, a significant shareholder in Wind Mobile. This transaction would create the world's fifth-largest mobile operator with over 173 million subscribers. In June 2011, Ken Campbell, Wind Mobile's founding CEO, resigned.

On November 7, Wind Mobile launched a new advertising campaign with the slogan "That's the power of Wind."

=== 2012: Revised plan offerings ===
On March 1, 2012, Wind Mobile refreshed its plan lineup. The Clever and Brilliant plans were eliminated, while Pay Your Way permanently included unlimited incoming calls on Wind's network. The mid-range Smart and high-end Genius plans lost their names and had some features altered. Only SMS messages sent to Canadian numbers were included, and all MMS or non-Canadian SMS became pay-per-use. The Wind 25 plan included 100 MB of mobile Internet access, while the Wind 40 plan featured 5 GB of full-speed mobile Internet instead of voicemail.

=== 2013: Leadership change ===
On January 18, 2013, Anthony Lacavera announced his transition from CEO to chairman of the company. At the same time, Wind Mobile disclosed reaching approximately 600,000 subscribers. VimpelCom initiated efforts to find potential buyers for Wind in March 2013.

On April 10, Wind Mobile announced that it would withdraw from the Canadian Wireless Telecommunications Association. Mobilicity and Public Mobile also withdrew, alleging bias favouring competitors Bell, Rogers, and Telus.

On June 19, 2013, Orascom Telecom, a VimpelCom subsidiary, retracted its application to assume full control of Wind Mobile, reversing an earlier decision. Later that month, reports emerged that Verizon Wireless had made a $700 million offer to acquire Wind Mobile, although Verizon later announced no interest in the Canadian wireless market.

On September 4, reports surfaced that Wind Mobile was negotiating to acquire customers from struggling competitor Mobilicity as it prepared to cease consumer operations. Mobilicity denied these reports shortly after.

=== 2014: Financial restructuring ===
On January 13, 2014, VimpelCom, Wind Mobile's majority shareholder through its subsidiaries Wind Telecom and Global Telecom Holding, withdrew its financial support for Wind Mobile's bid in the Industry Canada 700 MHz spectrum auction due to a dispute with the Canadian federal government.

By September 2014, VimpelCom sold its majority stake in Wind Mobile to AAL Acquisitions Corporation (a holding company controlled by Wind Mobile founder Anthony Lacavera) for $135 million, with the consortium also assuming $150 million of Wind's debt. Industry Canada approved the transaction in November 2014, transferring Wind's spectrum licences to AAL Acquisitions Corp. These assets were subsequently transferred to Mid-Bowline Holdings Corporation, controlled by a consortium of investors including Globalive and several Canadian and American private equity firms. Wind Mobile retained licensing rights to the Wind name and logo until 2016.

In December 2014, newly appointed CEO Pietro Cordova outlined Wind Mobile's plans for expanding LTE services and participating in the Canadian Government's 2015 spectrum auctions, opportunities previously restricted under VimpelCom's ownership. Cordova also proposed acquiring underutilized spectrum from other companies such as Vidéotron Mobile and unused AWS spectrum purchased by Shaw Communications, as well as developing partnerships with providers like Mobilicity and Vidéotron to expand Wind's coverage. Cordova suggested the possibility of Wind Mobile pursuing an initial public offering in 2016 or 2017, pending approval from Mid-Bowline Holdings investors.

=== 2015: Attempted merger with Mobilicity ===
In February 2015, Wind Mobile entered negotiations to acquire Mobilicity ahead of the AWS-3 spectrum auction registration deadline, but talks stalled when Mobilicity's creditors demanded a high price for its assets. By January 30, 2015, discussions ended, and both companies registered independently for the auction.

When Industry Canada announced the results of the AWS-3 auction on March 6, 2015, Mobilicity had withdrawn due to funding constraints, allowing Wind Mobile to secure the entire spectrum block allocated for new entrants in Alberta, British Columbia, and southern Ontario for $56.4 million. This increased Wind's spectrum holdings in these regions by 180 percent.

On March 23, 2015, Alek Krstajic, former CEO of Public Mobile, became the CEO of Wind Mobile, with Robert MacLellan, a former Toronto-Dominion Bank executive, appointed as chairman. At that time, Wind's shareholders included Toronto hedge fund West Face Capital (35%), California-based Tennenbaum Capital Partners (31%), and Globalive Capital Voting Group (25%), which included Tony Lacavera's investment fund, along with other investors such as Alex Shnaider, Terrence Hui, and Michael Serruya.

Wind made headlines on June 17, 2015, as the first cellular provider to offer service in TTC subway stations, securing exclusive rights to the underground mobile system for one year through an agreement with BAI Canada.

In June 2015, under Rogers Communication's acquisition of Mobilicity, Wind Mobile acquired AWS spectrum licenses from both Rogers and Mobilicity for provinces including British Columbia, Alberta, Saskatchewan, Manitoba, and northern and eastern Ontario for a nominal fee of $1 per license. Additionally, Wind gained an option to purchase half of Mobilicity's infrastructure for $25 million and executed a spectrum swap with Rogers, ensuring that both companies' AWS spectrum blocks were contiguous in southern Ontario.

Subsequently, on July 31, 2015, Wind sold newly acquired AWS-1 spectrum licenses to regional telecoms MTS and SaskTel for a total of $45 million, aiming to enhance regional competition and fund LTE network upgrades in British Columbia, Alberta, and Ontario.

=== 2016: Shaw Communications acquires Wind Mobile ===
On December 16, 2015, Shaw Communications announced plans to acquire Wind Mobile's parent company, Mid-Bowline Group, for approximately $1.6 billion. The acquisition required approval from Innovation, Science and Economic Development Canada and the Competition Bureau. As part of the announcement, Shaw outlined several terms of the acquisition: Alek Krstajic, then-CEO, would continue to lead Wind as a division within Shaw, headquartered in Toronto as a distinct unit. Wind would remain as a budget-priced mobile carrier in the short term, and the ongoing upgrade from HSPA 3G to LTE would proceed as planned. Shaw Communications' CEO, Brad Shaw, stated that the acquisition would enable Shaw to compete on the same level as rival Telus in western Canada and gain a foothold in the Ontario telecom market.

The Competition Bureau approved the purchase on February 4, 2016, and Shaw completed the acquisition on March 1, 2016. Shaw funded part of the deal by selling Shaw Media to Corus Entertainment, also controlled by the Shaw family.

Former Freedom Mobile logo (2016-2024)

On November 21, 2016, Shaw announced that Wind Mobile would be renamed Freedom Mobile. The decision to rebrand was influenced by rising royalty fees for licensing the Wind name from VimpelCom. CEO Alek Krstajic explained that the company wanted to shed the "baggage" associated with the Wind name and use the rebranding to signify new ownership. On the same day, Freedom Mobile announced the launch of LTE service on the AWS-3 band in Toronto and Vancouver.

=== 2017: Leadership change ===
In April 2017, Alek Krstajic stepped down as CEO and was replaced by Paul McAleese, whose title was later changed to Chief Operating Officer.

On November 7, 2017, Freedom Mobile announced that LTE access would be enabled on all grandfathered 3G plans at no additional cost. This upgrade coincided with a national upgrade of Freedom's cell sites to utilize newly acquired 2500 MHz (Band 7) spectrum and the reallocation of some AWS-1 (Band 4) spectrum for LTE.

=== 2020: Shaw Mobile ===
In July 2020, Shaw began operating Shaw Mobile as an MVNO on the Freedom Mobile network in Alberta and British Columbia. The service was offered as part of a quadruple play with Shaw's television, Internet, and home phone services.

=== 2021: Rogers to buy Shaw ===
Rogers Communications and Shaw Communications announced a $26 billion transaction on March 15, 2021, where Rogers would acquire all outstanding Class A and Class B shares of Shaw. The transaction, reflecting a 70% premium on Shaw's Class B share price, aims to boost 5G infrastructure in western Canada, create 3,000 jobs, and connect underserved communities. Rogers committed to not increasing wireless prices for Freedom Mobile customers for at least three years post-transaction. The transaction was expected to close in the first half of 2022, pending regulatory and court approvals.

On April 21, 2021, Freedom Mobile announced an indefinite pause on its 5G network launch through a memo to its employees. The memo explained that the decision was necessary due to the highly competitive market and uncertainties regarding spectrum and infrastructure needed for future phases of the 5G rollout. Amid the pending Rogers-Shaw merger, Freedom Mobile's parent company opted out of the federal government's 5G spectrum auction.

=== 2022: Québecor to buy Freedom Mobile ===
On March 3, 2022, the federal government announced it would block the transfer of wireless licenses from Shaw Communications to Rogers Communications. Industry Minister François-Philippe Champagne expressed concerns that the $26-billion acquisition of Shaw by Rogers would reduce competition and increase cellphone bills for Canadians. The acquisition was being reviewed by three federal regulators: Innovation, Science and Economic Development Canada, the Canadian Radio-television and Telecommunications Commission, and the Competition Bureau.

On March 24, 2022, the Canadian Radio-television and Telecommunications Commission (CRTC) approved Rogers Communications's acquisition of Shaw Communications's broadcasting services. This approval came with several conditions, including a $27.2 million contribution to various funds and the creation of an Indigenous news team. The CRTC concluded that the transaction would not reduce the diversity of voices in Canada or unduly affect the competitive landscape, deeming it in the public interest.

On May 9, 2022, the Competition Bureau of Canada filed an application to block Rogers Communications's acquisition of Shaw Communications, arguing it would lead to higher prices, poorer service quality, and reduced choice for consumers, particularly in the wireless sector. The bureau's investigation found that the $26-billion deal would eliminate Shaw's Freedom Mobile, which it considered a strong independent competitor that has driven down prices and innovated in wireless services.

On May 12, 2022, Québecor's CEO Pierre Karl Péladeau signalled that he would like to purchase Freedom Mobile if regulators force Rogers to sell it as a requirement of the merger's approval. On May 19, 2022, Globalive Capital founder Anthony Lacavera reinforced his bid for Freedom Mobile by signing a network and spectrum sharing agreement with Telus, conditional on Globalive's successful acquisition of Freedom. Lacavera founded Wind Mobile in 2008.

On June 17, 2022, Rogers Communications announced it would sell Freedom Mobile to Québecor for $2.85 billion, aiming to address regulatory opposition to its acquisition of Shaw Communications. This deal included Freedom's wireless and Internet customers, infrastructure, spectrum, and retail sites.

On August 12, 2022, Rogers Communications, Shaw Communications, and Québecor finalized an agreement for Québecor's subsidiary, Vidéotron, to acquire Freedom Mobile. "The parties strongly believe the Freedom Transaction provides the best opportunity to create a strong fourth national wireless services provider and addresses the concerns raised by the Commissioner of Competition and the Minister of Innovation, Science and Industry regarding the Rogers-Shaw Transaction. With this Agreement, the new combined business of Vidéotron and Freedom will be well-positioned to launch a strong, competitive national 5G offering, using Vidéotron's 3500 MHz holdings."

On December 29, 2022, the Competition Tribunal rejected the Competition Bureau's attempt to block the merger, ruling that the consolidation of the two companies, along with the sale of Freedom Mobile to Vidéotron, would not significantly raise prices or reduce competition. On December 30, 2022, the Competition Bureau announced it would appeal the Competition Tribunal's decision.

=== 2023: Québecor acquires Freedom Mobile ===
On January 24, 2023, the Federal Court of Appeal rejected the Commissioner of Competition's bid to overturn the tribunal's approval of the Rogers-Shaw merger. The court ruled that the merger, which includes the sale of Freedom Mobile to Vidéotron, would not significantly impact prices or competition in Canada's telecommunications sector. Despite the Competition Bureau's objections, the court found no basis to overturn the tribunal's decision, paving the way for the merger pending final approval from Innovation, Science and Economic Development Canada.

On March 31, 2023, François-Philippe Champagne, Minister of Innovation, Science and Industry, gave the final regulatory approval to the deal by allowing the transfer of Freedom's wireless licences to Vidéotron. As part of these agreements and conditions, Vidéotron:

- Will, over a period of ten years, offer plans that are at least 20% cheaper than those offered by the incumbents in the British Columbia, Alberta and Ontario markets as of February 10, 2023;
- Cannot transfer the Freedom Mobile licences for a period of ten years;
- Invest more than $150 million to upgrade Freedom Mobile's infrastructure, which will, among other things, enable 90% of its current and future customers to access the 5G network using a compatible device within two years;
- Will expand mobile service into Manitoba via the use of a signed Mobile Virtual Network Operator (MVNO) agreement or other means and offer plans comparable to what it offers in Quebec;
- Will maintain prices for Freedom Mobile's existing customers for five years; and,
- Will increase data allotments of existing Freedom Mobile customers by 10% as a near-term bonus while it invests to bring down prices overall.

Failure to comply with these conditions may result in substantial financial penalties, with Vidéotron facing potential damages of up to $200 million. Vidéotron and Rogers have also entered into commercial network-access agreements, which includes a MVNO and Domestic Roaming Agreement, on terms that will help Vidéotron compete more effectively as it expands in other regions of Canada.

The acquisition was completed on April 3, 2023. On July 24, 2023, Freedom Mobile launched 5G and nationwide unlimited plans, expanding its 5G network to cover over 12 million residents in the Toronto, Vancouver, Calgary and Edmonton metropolitan areas, along with select cities across Ontario, British Columbia and Alberta. On November 21, 2023, Freedom Mobile introduced the "Roam Beyond" plan, initially offering roaming in 73 countries. By June 20, 2024, the plans expanded their coverage to include roaming in 92 countries. 30-day "Roam Beyond Passes" are also available.

=== 2024: Freedom Home Internet and Freedom TV ===
In May 2024, Freedom Mobile began to quietly launch home Internet and IPTV services resold from Vidéotron-owned VMedia in selected markets, allowing it to offer a triple play service. Péladeau stated that "making Freedom a 3-product player is a key milestone in our plan to give Canadians better telecommunications options and to foster healthy competition in more markets."

On May 23, 2024, Freedom Mobile expanded its services into Manitoba as an MVNO, introducing wireless, home Internet, and TV options along with new retail locations in Winnipeg. Pierre Karl Peladeau, Québecor's CEO, emphasized the milestone as a significant move towards providing innovative and affordable telecom solutions to Manitobans, promoting competition in the region. Alongside this launch, Freedom introduced the Subscription Area, expanding customer eligibility beyond the Freedom Network boundaries. Additionally, Freedom is required to build out its own network in region where it operates as an MVNO within seven years.

In 2024, Freedom Mobile began deploying some 3500 MHz 5G sites in the Greater Toronto Area and Vancouver.

On July 25, 2024, Freedom Mobile revamped its wireless plans, introducing 5G access and U.S. and Mexico roaming to all monthly phone plans, with prices starting at $5 per month.

Freedom Mobile has a name sponsorship deal with an outdoor events venue on the Pacific National Exhibition grounds, to be opened in 2026.

=== 2025: 5G+ ===
On January 28, 2025, Freedom Mobile refreshed their plan offerings with every plan now including 5G+.

== Products ==
As of 2025, Freedom Mobile carries iPhone and Android smartphones, plus the TCL Flip6 feature phone. The carrier's Android lineup currently includes devices from Google, Motorola, Samsung and TCL. Sales of Android devices at the provider began in 2010. From June 25 to August 4, 2015, Freedom (then known as Wind) sold refurbished iPhone 5c and 5s devices, with sales being discontinued due to a dispute between Apple and Freedom's third-party supplier. On December 8, 2017, Freedom Mobile began Apple-certified sales of brand-new iPhone devices.

Historically, Freedom only supported devices with 3G UMTS connectivity on the Advanced Wireless Services (AWS) spectrum. The same network technology was used by T-Mobile US from May 2008 to July 2022, and almost all unlocked 3G devices from this carrier can be used on Freedom's 3G network. In December 2016, Freedom launched its 4G LTE service by repurposing some of its AWS spectrum. This has led to more devices being compatible with Freedom, as almost all major carriers in North America have used AWS to deploy their LTE network. Older devices sold by Freedom include those with the BlackBerry, Symbian and Windows operating systems, which are no longer supported.

== Radio frequencies ==
Frequency range	Band number	Protocol	Class	Status	Note(s)
1700/2100 MHz AWS	4	UMTS/HSPA/HSPA+/DC-HSPA+	3G	Active	The only band used for providing UMTS voice and data services.
600 MHz DD	71	LTE/LTE-A	4G	Active	Acquired in a 2019 auction and deployed in Kingston and Ottawa.
700 MHz Upper C Block	13	LTE/LTE-A	4G	Active	This is an additional LTE band with better signal propagation to enhance indoor service and fill gaps in network coverage. It is also used to provide LTE Advanced coverage in select markets. This band was acquired from Québecor and is restricted to devices sold by Freedom or BYOD devices from Samsung, Google, LG, Motorola, or Apple, subject to specific models listed in the Compatibility Matrix.
1700/2100 MHz AWS	4/66	LTE/LTE-A	4G	Active	This is the primary band for LTE service across all regions except Eastern Ontario. It is also utilized for LTE Advanced coverage in select markets.
2600 MHz IMT-E	7	LTE/LTE-A	4G	Active	This is the primary band for LTE, compatible with legacy devices and used for LTE Advanced coverage in select markets. Carrier Aggregation is used in conjunction with Band 66, excluding Eastern Ontario. It was acquired from Québecor.
2600 MHz IMT-E	38	LTE/LTE-A	4G	Pending Development	This additional band for LTE is used in select regions of Western Canada and was acquired in a residual spectrum auction.
600 MHz DD	n71	NR	5G	Active/Building out	Currently available in Greater Vancouver, Calgary, Edmonton, the GTA, Hamilton, London, and Windsor.
1700/2100 MHz AWS	n66	NR	5G	Active/Building out	Access provided by Vidéotron in Quebec.
3500 MHz C-Band	n78	NR	5G	Active/Building out	Currently available in the GTA and Hamilton, BC's Lower Mainland，urban areas of Edmonton & Calgary, with the Edmonton International Airport.
