= Global Telecom Holding =

Multinational telecommunication company based in Egypt

Global Telecom Holding S.A.E. (جلوبال تيلكوم القابضة (ش.م.م
- Formerly: Orascom Telecom Holding
- Type: Société Anonyme Égyptienne
- Traded as: EGX: GTHE
- Founded: 1998 in Cairo, Egypt
- Headquarters: Amsterdam, Netherlands
- Products: mobile networks
- Revenue: ▲US$2.956 billion (2016)
- Owner: VEON (98.24%)

Global Telecom Holding S.A.E. (GTH; formerly Orascom Telecom Holding) is a holding company based in Amsterdam, and a subsidiary of the multinational telecommunications services company VEON. GTH previously owned mobile network operators in multiple countries.

== Operations ==
Global Telecom has delisted from the Egyptian Exchange (EGX) and is based in Amsterdam, Netherlands.

== History ==
In 1997, Orascom Telecom Holding (OTH) was established as a separate entity to consolidate the telecommunications and technology interests of the Orascom group of companies established in 1976. Founded in 1998 as part of the Orascom company, it became the largest cellular operator in the Middle East in only five years.

In 2010, Russian Vimpelcom acquired Orascom Telecom as well as Wind Telecomunicazioni from Weather Investments of the Egyptian entrepreneur Naguib Sawiris and merged the two companies. This led to the establishment of two separate companies, Orascom Telecom Holding, based in Cairo, and Orascom Telecom Media and Technology Holding. Excluded from this transaction were the activities in North Korea (Koryolink) and Egypt, which were transferred to Orascom Telecom Media and Technology Holding, which remained majority-owned by Naguib Sawiris. The Italian activities of Wind Telecomunicazioni report directly to the parent company Vimpelcom.

Orascom Telecom Holding was renamed Global Telecom Holding in 2013. On 1 July 2019 Gerbrand Nijman (since June 2015 GTH's group CFO) succeeded Vincenzo Nesci as GTH's CEO.
