= Mobilicity =

Canadian telecommunications company (2009–2016)

Data and Audio-Visual Enterprises Wireless
- Trade name: Mobilicity
- Type: Subsidiary
- Industry: Mobile virtual network operator
- Founded: 2009; 17 years ago in Vaughan, Ontario, Canada
- Founder: John Bitove
- Defunct: 2016
- Fate: Brand discontinued and customers moved to Chatr
- Headquarters: Vaughan, Ontario, Canada
- Products: BlackBerry Smartphones, Wireless Data Services, SMS, MMS, HSPA (including HSPA+)
- Parent: Rogers Communications
- Website: mobilicity.ca

Data and Audio-Visual Enterprises Wireless, d/b/a Mobilicity, was a Canadian mobile network operator (MNO), who was later acquired by Rogers Communications for approximately $450M CAD in 2015. Its name was a portmanteau of the words "mobility" and "simplicity". Mobilicity was one of several new mobile network operators, along with Public Mobile (later acquired by Telus) and Wind Mobile (later acquired by Shaw Communications), which launched in Canada after a government initiative to encourage competition in the wireless sector. The carrier had over 250,000 Mobilicity subscriptions on May 16, 2013, the day on which Telus announced its failed attempt to acquire Mobilicity. The subscription count decreased to 157,000 by April 2015 according to court documents filed by Mobilicity's Chief Restructuring Officer in that month.

On June 24, 2015, the Ontario Superior Court gave approval for the sale of Mobilicity to Rogers for $440 million CAD at which point Mobilicity became an MVNO operating on the Rogers network. In May 2016, Rogers announced it planned to retire the Mobilicity brand and migrate subscribers to its Chatr brand by the end of 2016.

== History ==
=== 2008–2009: Early years ===
Originally formed as DAVE Wireless by Canadian businessman John Bitove, the company entered the 2008 spectrum auction for AWS frequencies. DAVE spent $243 million on 10 MHz of AWS spectrum blocks largely covering southern and eastern Ontario, Vancouver, Calgary and Edmonton. The domain davewireless.com was registered on July 10, 2008, via Go Daddy. Later, on October 27, 2009, the domain mobilicity.ca was registered via Internic.ca and the Canadian Internet Registration Authority (CIRA).

Dave Dobbin, who had held executive posts at other telecom firms (COO of Telecom Ottawa, President of Toronto Hydro Telecom, President of Cogeco Data Services), was named president and CEO.

=== 2010–2012: Launch and competition ===
Number of Mobilicity subscribers
Date	Additions	Total	Increase
2011-09-30		143,500	?
2011-12-31		206,500	44%
2012-05-23		250,000	?
2012-12-31		271,337	?
2013-03-30	-16,800	254,457	-6.22%
2013-06-31	-19,035	235,422	-7.48%
2013-09-30	-19,478	215,944	-8.27%
2014-06-31		157,000	?
2014-08-30	-700	156,300	-0.45%
2014-10-31	2,337	158,637	1.47%
2015-04-30	-1,637	157,000	-1.03%

DAVE Wireless's website was launched with information on January 7. The following month, on February 2, it was confirmed that the company would operate under the name Mobilicity. The company was built to deliver Canadians a simple mobile solution. Later, service was launched to the public on May 15, but only for the city of Toronto. On November 17, service was launched in Edmonton and Vancouver, and in the Ottawa and Gatineau area the following day. Coverage in Calgary went live on April 28, 2011. This was the last major update to Mobilicity's coverage.

During Q4 2011, Mobilicity had a 50% off sale on all monthly plans. Dave Dobbin resigned in November 2011. John Bitove assumed the role of Executive Chairman. Stewart Lyons, formerly Executive Vice President of XM Satellite Radio Canada, replaced Dobbin as Mobilicity's president, while Bitove assumed the role of Executive Chairman. Mobilicity ended the year with approximately 206,500 subscribers, of which 113,000 (54%) who activated during Q4 of either 2010 or 2011.

Several new devices launched at Mobilicity during the first half of 2012. The carrier launched the Galaxy Nexus, its first Android 4.0 device, on February 2. This happened one day before competitor Wind Mobile launched the same phone. Mobilicity sold the phone at a $600 retail price, but cut it in half to $300 by Q3 2012. The first Windows Phone sold by Mobilicity was the Nokia Lumia 710, released on May 17, 2012, and discontinued in Q3 2012. The BlackBerry Curve 9320 was released on June 6, 2012, and the Samsung Galaxy S III was released on June 27, 2012.

On April 1, Mobilicity changed its plans and website, which remain available to this day. Variants of the 50% off sale for monthly plans were reintroduced in 2012 during the months of May, September, November and December. October 2012 saw the addition of 24-month multi-month discounts and, on October 30, a premium service option for faster mobile broadband. Loblaw Companies was added as a retail partner.

=== 2013–2015: Financial restructuring, attempted acquisition deals ===
On February 12, 2013, Mobilicity announced a new multi-stage financing deal worth $75 million. Of this sum, $15 million has already been provided to Mobilicity. Catalyst Capital Group, however, opened a file at an Ontario court in an attempt to halt this deal.

On April 10, 2013, Mobilicity announced that it would withdraw from the Canadian Wireless Telecommunications Association. The other wireless startups, Public Mobile and Wind Mobile, also withdrew from the CWTA, citing "bias in favour of Rogers, Bell and TELUS" as the main factor. Gary Wong, Director of Legal Affairs for Mobilicity, was quoted as saying "We have spent the better part of three years repeatedly voicing our opposition to the CWTA on a wide range of matters to the point of issuing a press release in January 2011 that publicly expressed our dissent on the CWTA's position on wireless consumer protection."

On April 26, 2013, an order was issued by the Ontario Superior Court of Justice allowing Mobilicity to attempt restructuring. The court order allows Mobilicity to ask creditors to vote on business sale and restructuring plans which contain actions that are intended to help the company raise additional capital and pursue other strategic options.

Mobilicity announced on July 10, 2013, that the company was "in discussions with multiple parties in connection with an acquisition plan of arrangement." It was reported in the National Post on September 4, 2013, that Mobilicity was in negotiations to have Wind Mobile assume their customers while investors retained control of spectrum licenses, though this report was later denied by Mobilicity.

Mobilicity initially had an end date of October 30, 2013, for its Stay Period, which prohibits "proceedings against the applicants or the property". Stewart Lyons resigned from Mobilicity the following day. Mobilicity's Stay Period has since been extended ten times and now carries an end date of August 31, 2015.

==== Telus and WIND Mobile interest ====
On May 16, 2013, Telus announced that it has agreed to acquire Mobilicity for $380 million, pending regulatory approval. On that day, Mobilicity had over 250,000 subscribers and 150 employees. Industry Minister Christian Paradis announced on June 4, 2013, that the Canadian federal government would prohibit the Telus takeover of Mobilicity because it would be a violation of the conditions of the 2009 AWS spectrum auction. Public Mobile was acquired by Telus on October 23, 2013. Telus made a second attempt to acquire Mobilicity on April 17, 2014, for $350 million. Mobilicity stated that they believe the deal "will not affect competition in the Canadian wireless sector" and will satisfy government regulators. The Competition Bureau disagreed with Mobilicity's claim and blocked the sale again. Telus ultimately terminated its acquisition plans.

Following the blocking of the proposed Telus deal, WIND Mobile then-CEO Anthony Lacavera stated that WIND was interested in re-opening consolidation discussions with Mobilicity. Lacavera had called for the consolidation of WIND Mobile, Mobilicity, and Public Mobile in the past to better compete with the three major Canadian wireless companies, a plan rebuffed by both Mobilicity and Public Mobile. After it was announced that American carrier Verizon Wireless would be putting off and ultimately cancelling a decision on offering to buy Wind Mobile or Mobilicity, Lacavera announced that in addition to buying back a controlling share of Wind Mobile he remained interested in purchasing Mobilicity.

Starting in May 2014, WIND Mobile made several promotions targeted at Mobilicity customers. The first was a free month of service for any plan worth up to $60. In December 2014, following the recapitalization of WIND Mobile by new investors, it offered $60 in service credits and a free SIM card to customers porting a number from Mobilicity. During January and February 2015, WIND offered Mobilicity customers a free SIM card and six months of free service on the WIND35 plan for switching.

In February 2015, the Financial Post reported that WIND Mobile was in negotiations to take over Mobilicity in the weeks leading up to the AWS-3 spectrum auction registration deadline. The negotiations had been reportedly stalled due to the high price that Mobilicity's creditors were requesting from WIND to purchase the smaller carrier's assets. Discussions halted on January 30, 2015 (the application deadline for the spectrum auction) and were put on hold until the auction results were announced in March 2015, since both carriers had registered for the auction and anti-collusion regulations prohibited any discussion or negotiation of deals between competitors during the auction.

=== 2015: Acquisition by Rogers ===
Telus had made three unsuccessful bids to purchase Mobilicity out of bankruptcy, starting in 2013, and while they were all approved by creditors, regulators blocked the bids since Mobilicity's ten spectrum licenses were set aside exclusively for new entrants and Industry Canada would not allow them to be transferred to incumbents "because of a fear of undue spectrum concentration". In addition, WIND Mobile had been seeking more spectrum, especially in Ottawa, but Wind's $200 million offer for Mobilicity was too low to satisfy creditors even though it had regulatory approval. Telus also initially did not want to transfer spectrum to WIND at no cost. WIND CEO Alek Krstajic, formerly a senior vice president of sales at Rogers Communications and former president of Bell Mobility, then approached Rogers CEO Guy Laurence about a deal where Rogers would acquire Mobilicity and then transfer some of Mobilicity's AWS spectrum licenses to WIND at no cost.

In early June 2015, both Telus and Rogers Communications bid to acquire Mobilicity, primarily for its wireless spectrum. Unlike in previous acquisition attempts, Industry Canada was willing to consider approving a sale of the smaller carrier to one Canada's major telecom companies provided that some of Mobilicity's AWS spectrum licenses were sold or transferred to former competitor WIND Mobile. On June 23, Mobilicity's creditors approved a $440 million deal which would see Rogers acquire the entire company while divesting certain spectrum licenses to Wind. The acquisition plans were approved by the Ontario Superior Court (as overseer of Mobilicity's bankruptcy proceedings), Industry Canada, and the federal Competition Bureau on June 24.

=== 2016: Shutdown ===
Rogers announced its intention to retire the Mobilicity brand on May 10, 2016, and stopped activating new Mobilicity lines on August 15, 2016. Existing customers' plans were not grandfathered. Mobilicity subscribers were instead given a choice of "comparable" plans when they are migrated to Rogers' other value-brand mobile provider Chatr beginning in fall 2016. Rogers also stated it would convert "over half" of existing Mobilicity retail outlets to Chatr branding. On July 27, 2016, Rogers launched the My Chatr Move website to facilitate Mobilicity customers switching to Chatr.

== Network ==
=== 1700/2100 MHz AWS 3G (2009–2015) ===
Mobilicity's network was built in 2009 and maintained by Ericsson. The company also had a cell-site sharing agreement with Bell Mobility to share cell tower space in all Mobilicity zones. On July 3, 2012, Mobilicity expanded its agreement with Ericsson to manage the network. Ericsson was responsible for planning, engineering, and optimizing the network.

The network used the UMTS IV frequency band, commonly known as Advanced Wireless Services or AWS-1, to provide UMTS service with HSPA data ("3G"). Using this band, user equipment transmitted at 1710–1755 MHz, and received at 2110–2155 MHz. The same frequencies are used by Eastlink Wireless, Wind Mobile and Vidéotron Mobile in Canada; as well as T-Mobile in the United States. Mobilicity's network was compatible with the same 3G handsets and devices offered by these carriers.

John Bitove, founder of Mobilicity, said that 90% of traffic on that mobile network consisted of mobile broadband. Mobilicity announced on June 14, 2012, that it planned to upgrade its older HSPA network to HSPA+, marketing it as 4G. The carrier claimed to have finished this upgrade on October 30, 2012. It provides a theoretical maximum download speeds of up to 21.1 Mbit/s, a significant improvement compared to the previous limit of 3.6 Mbit/s, but only customers with a premium plan or add-on could access these faster speeds. Others were throttled to a maximum of 2 Mbit/s at all times, with slower speeds after the full speed usage limit is exceeded.

Mobilicity's network coverage included parts of the Greater Toronto Area, Ottawa including Gatineau, plus Calgary, Edmonton, and the Greater Vancouver area. The carrier has not added any new cities since April 28, 2011, and has been greatly criticized for lack of network improvements when it comes to both densification and expansion. Stewart Lyons, former president and COO of Mobilicity, stated that "we are still planning to expand network further (we already have in Vancouver, Toronto, and Edmonton) and improve speeds to HSPA+ (21.1 Mbit/s) before the year end [2012]." This included the addition Orleans, Cumberland, extended Vancouver and Hamilton. However, Mobilicity failed to ever complete any significant network expansion.

== Products ==
Numerous products are available at Mobilicity. While the carrier mostly sells various smartphones, other types of products are also available. There is a 7-day period for return or exchange on newly purchased products provided that the device does not have a total talk-time exceeding 30 minutes. The time period used to consist of 30 days. All devices in Mobilicity's current lineup include a 365-day warranty.

The vast majority of Mobilicity's products are sold locked. There are many reasons why a customer might want to use a Mobilicity device with a non-Mobilicity SIM card. For example, a customer might want cheaper cell phone service while travelling. Still, Mobilicity does not unlock the devices it sells, except in rare cases at its own discretion.

Mobilicity also offers "Unlimited Prepaid" packages, previously known as "Unlimited To Go". They consist of a feature phone or smartphone, bundled with a SIM card and one, two or three months of unlimited talk and text on Mobilicity's network, usually at a reduced cost. Bundles sometime include a Bluetooth headset or mobile broadband service.

=== Feature phones ===
Mobilicity offers a small selection of feature phones. Two models are available: the Huawei U2801 and the Samsung C414Y. Both were sold at the price of $50 per phone during Mobilicity's 50% off sale in May 2012.

On the day of Mobilicity's launch, the Huawei U7519, Totem and Sony Ericsson TM506 feature phones were available. All are officially discontinued, although "Unlimited To Go" packages for the TM506 are still available at select HMV and Zellers. The TM506 is notable for being Mobilicity's only feature phone to be sold factory unlocked, allowing it to be used on non-Mobilicity networks compatible with the phone such as Wind Mobile, Videotron Mobile, T-Mobile USA or Rogers Wireless.

=== Smartphones ===
Mobilicity offers various smartphones, each using one of three platforms:

- Android: Samsung Galaxy Note II, S III and Q; Sony Xperia T
- BlackBerry OS: Curve 9320, Bold 9790, and BlackBerry Z10
- Windows Phone 8: HTC Windows Phone 8S

Mobilicity also exclusively carried the Mobiflip smartphone in Canada. A variant of the T-Mobile Sidekick LX 2009, Mobilicity launched it on December 22, 2010. It was discontinued some time in 2011. The Samsung Gravity Touch feature phone is similar and succeeds the Mobiflip. The HTC Panache 4G was also exclusive to Mobilicity in all of its markets except for Ottawa. It was discontinued following the Galaxy Nexus' launch.

On the day of Mobilicity's launch, the BlackBerry Bold 9700, the HTC Snap, and the Nokia 5230 smartphones were available. The last Symbian smartphone sold by Mobilicity was the Nokia 500. The only Windows Phone 7 device sold by Mobilicity was the Nokia Lumia 710, which was sold from May 17, 2012, until September 30, 2012. All these smartphones are now discontinued.

Although the iPhone is not carried by Mobilicity, the iPhone 5 and later models are supported on Mobilicity's network.

=== Internet access devices ===
Mobilicity sells two devices that are exclusively designed for mobile broadband:the Huawei E1691 and the Huawei E583C. The E1691 is a USB mobile broadband modem that is officially supported by computers using the Windows, Mac OS X 10.4 or higher, or Linux operating systems. Mobilicity's version of this modem is white and features a coloured Mobilicity logo. The E583 is a portable device, similar to the MiFi, that allows any Wi-Fi device to connect to mobile Internet. Both can download at speeds up to 7.2 Mbit/s, although Mobilicity makes it unclear regarding whether or not their network supports such maximum theoretical speeds. Mobilicity also sells a Wi-Fi dock for use with the USB modem and a Wi-Fi signal repeater.

== Services ==
=== Voice plans ===
Mobilicity entered the Canadian market on May 15, 2010, with six mobile voice plans. The plans have since undergone various changes. The current lineup of four plans was introduced on April 1, 2012.

Current plans include unlimited local and provincial calling, unlimited sent SMS and MMS to Canada and continental USA, unlimited received messages from any regular phone number and the caller ID, call waiting, call forwarding and conference call calling features. All regular plans except for the one at $25 include Canada-wide long distance, unlimited sent SMS to regular international phone numbers, one of two mobile broadband options and the voicemail calling feature.

Roaming minutes are included in all of Mobilicity's current plans except for the one at $25. These can be used throughout Canada on Rogers Wireless' network, or throughout the United States on T-Mobile USA's network. Those who exceed the amount of roaming minutes included or who subscribe to another plan may top up their Mobilicity account with a certain amount to use for roaming purposes.

=== Mobile Internet ===
Mobilicity offers both site-limited and unlimited mobile broadband Internet access monthly add-ons at a low price to any feature phones or smartphones plan without this feature. Such services can only be used within Mobilicity's coverage area. Tethering is included as long as the phone used supports it. BlackBerry users must pay a premium to cover the BlackBerry Internet Service fee. There are also standalone monthly plans designed exclusively for mobile broadband modems. Pay-per-day access used to be offered but has been discontinued.

All customers, even those without a mobile Internet plan or add-on, can access the Mobilicity.ca website for free. Those without an Internet access subscription who wish to access other sites and services may do so if they have deposited money into a "Wallet" account with Mobilicity. In such a case, pay-per-use charges of $1.50/MB (equal to $1536/GB) apply. Such charges also apply for unintended Internet usage, whether the user accidentally accesses the Internet or whether an application accesses the Internet without asking permission. Most (but not all) phones let the owner completely disable mobile Internet access on the phone by making a small settings change.

Customers using mobile Internet on Mobilicity must follow the operator's Fair Use Policy, which prohibits "causing network instability", as well as illegal "copyright-protected or patent-protected material" transferred without the owner's permission. Those who breach the Fair Use Policy may face consequences, such as throttled Internet speeds or termination of service. Roaming is also not included and will result in additional charges. Mobilicity has been criticized for blocking legitimate traffic and for being unclear about its throttling practices, and for initially refusing to advise customers of what constituted acceptable usage, while maintaining claims of being unlimited, and even going as far as terminating the services of some customers for using too much of an unlimited service.

In October 2012, Mobilicity published a Fair Use Policy stating the allowances for full speed usage on its HSPA+ network. The policy sets a limit of 6 GB of usage at an approximate speed of 2 Mbit/s.

=== Roaming ===
Mobilicity's roaming partners are Rogers Wireless in Canada and T-Mobile USA or AT&T in the United States for 2G,3G and 4G service. For both countries, prices are the same, and roaming minutes bundles can be purchased at a reduced cost. Some monthly plans also include such roaming minutes. If these minutes run out, or if a customer does not have them in their plan, regular roaming rates apply. Roaming is also available internationally at higher rates than in Canada and the USA.

== Criticism ==
=== Misleading advertising ===
Telus Communications sued Mobilicity at the Supreme Court of British Columbia for running a television advertisement it deems to be "false and misleading". The ad in question features various posters with partial details of competitors' monthly plans in different colours, such as yellow for Fido Solutions and white on red for Rogers or Virgin. Mobilicity makes various claims regarding these, such as the requirement of a three-year contract or that unlimited talk time can only be used on evenings or weekends. Shawn Hall, a spokesperson for Telus, claims that "The ads damage Telus’s brand with false claims and must be pulled from circulation immediately." Mobilicity President and COO Stewart Lyons replied by claiming that "Telus is […] trying to intimidate us […] when they don’t feel like competing out on the street." Telus had partnered with Public Mobile to sue another new entrant, Wind Mobile, regarding its foreign funding. On December 20, 2012, Justice Christopher Grauer denied Telus's request for an injunction that would have prevented airing of the ads.

=== Mobile Internet policies ===
Before October 19, 2012, Mobilicity refused to provide a clear fair use policy despite many customers demanding this. The carrier cancelled services of some users without warning for excessive mobile Internet usage on an unlimited plan. Current COO Stewart Lyons claimed that "If they [Mobilicity customers] use too much data, too quickly, we slow [them] down and then we speed [them] back up."

On October 19, 2012, Mobilicity addressed the issue of unclear policies by publishing a mobile broadband fair use policy. It states that customers can use a minimum of 6 GB at full basic HSPA speed. By choosing a premium plan or add-on, one can obtain a larger allowance of 20 GB and premium HSPA+ speeds. This policy, similar to the practices of Wind Mobile and T-Mobile USA, replaces the older limit of 100 MB per 15 minutes. Some, however, have criticized Mobilicity for selling mobile Internet services on speed and protocol tiers, a practice also employed by Public Mobile with its 2G and 3G plans but not by Wind Mobile, which charges the same price for HSPA and HSPA+ access.

=== Network outages ===
Mobilicity has had many network outages, most of them minor and short-lived but two of the more well known and serious instances are discussed below. On August 24, 2011, Mobilicity had an outage in Vancouver, Edmonton and Calgary. Affected customers could choose to receive either a complimentary voice mail add-on at no charge for three consecutive months, or a one-time prepaid credit.

Towards the end of that year, on December 7, Mobilicity had an outage affecting all of its customers in the company's five markets. Initially, customers could not make any calls. Later, it was also impossible for them to receive calls. Those without Mobilicity who attempted to call a Mobilicity client would be subject to a busy signal, making it impossible for them to leave a voicemail even if the client subscribed to this feature. No compensation was offered to affected customers, possibly due to the 50% off sale happening at that time.

== Philanthropy ==
Mobilicity has raised over $100,000 in charitable donations for the "S'Cool Life Fund", a non-governmental funding source for Canadian primary schools established by Mobilicity founder and chairman John Bitove.

== Advertising ==
Mobilicity has had many advertising campaigns. In 2011, Mobilicity handed out Durex condoms on February 11, shortly before that year's Valentine's Day, in all the cities it served at the time. There was also a $69/month couples plan promoted, valid for two people, with unlimited mobile talk, text and Internet access. The network in Calgary was not yet launched and thus that city was excluded from this campaign.

Shortly thereafter, Mobilicity announced a "Data Access Fee/Tax" on April 1, 2011. The fictional $4.01 fee was simply an April Fools' Day joke mocking the system access fee previously charged by incumbent Canadian providers and Rogers Wireless' Government Regulatory Recovery Fee which is "tucked in" that operator's current monthly plans.

Later that year on June 16, Mobilicity began using two computer-animated aliens to advertise its products. As a result of a naming competition the company had on the social networking site Facebook, the characters were named "Otis" (green male) and "Alexis" (purple female).

== Retail presence ==
Mobilicity had its own corporate retail store. Additionally, there were some stores third-party authorized dealers that sell "Unlimited Prepaid" packages and sometimes the whole line of Mobilicity products. This includes 7-Eleven, HMV, Metro, NCIX, Staples, The Brick, Walmart and the former Zellers chain. For the Metro stores, there were initially eight locations in Toronto and one in Ottawa selling Mobilicity, but this is now reduced to only four Toronto locations. The arrangement consisted of Mobilicity launching full-service kiosks inside these Metro stores. It excluded Metro's Food Basics and Super C discount brands. Mobilicity closed all its third party retail operations in early 2013.

Unlike Wind Mobile, Mobilicity did not open a retail store catering to the French demographic. They only translated the packages of their Unlimited Prepaid products. French-speaking regions where the Mobilicity network was available include the Vanier neighborhoods in Ottawa, as well as Gatineau.

== Gallery ==
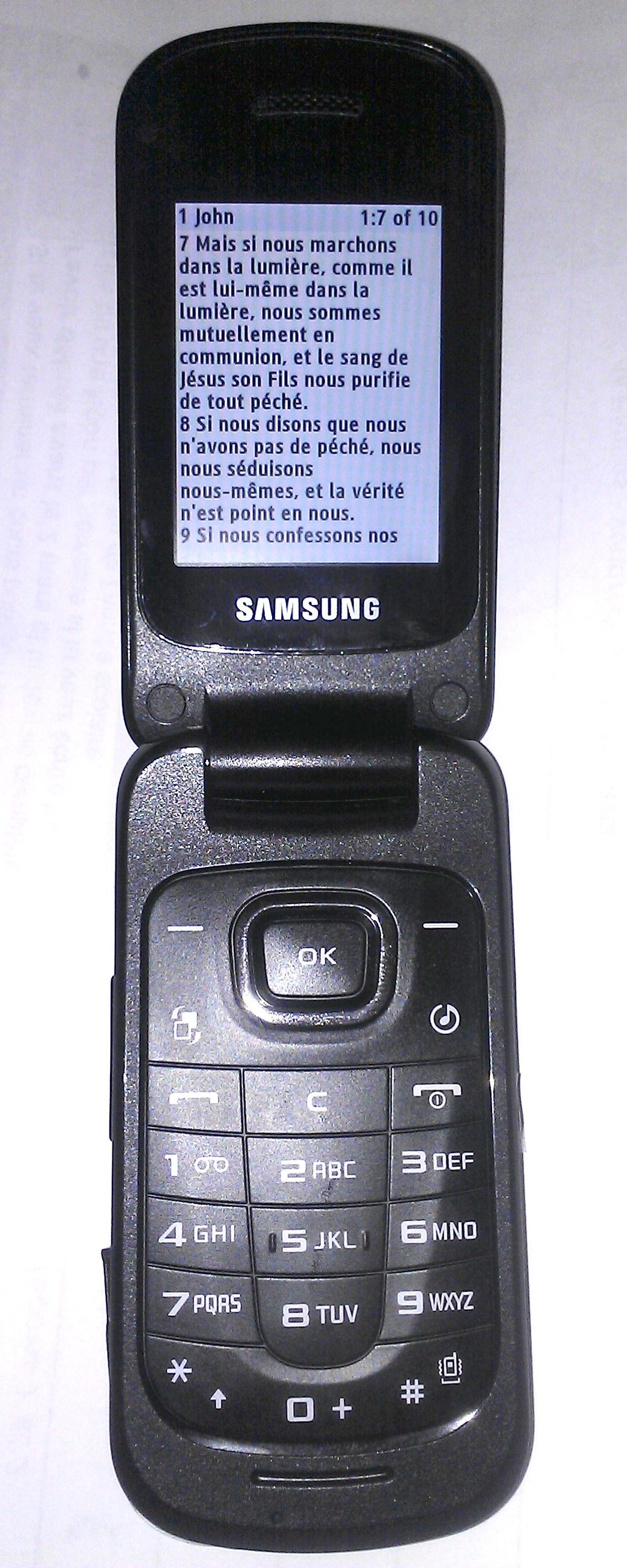
1 - Samsung C414

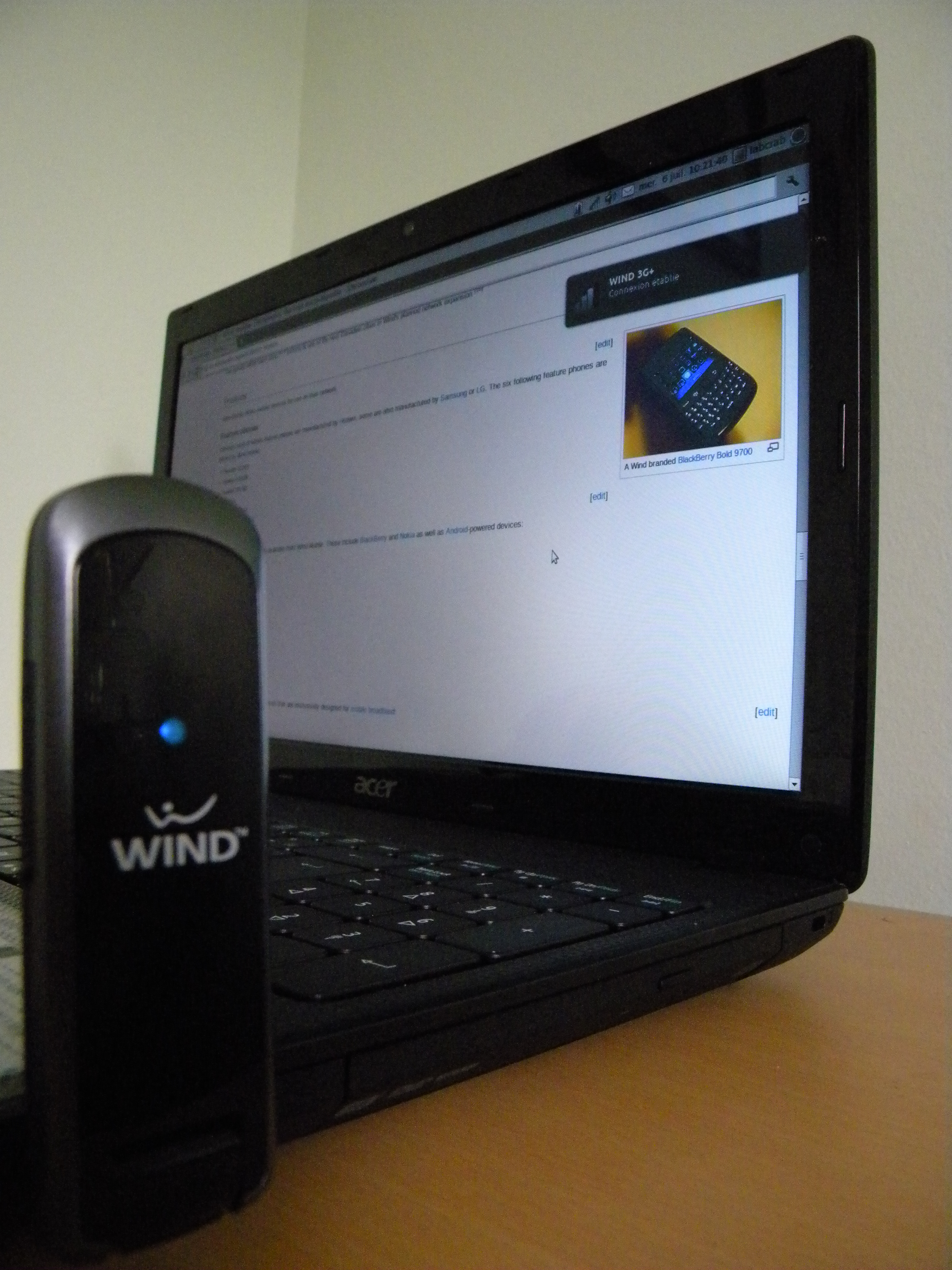
2 – Huawei E1691

3 - Mobilicity mascots

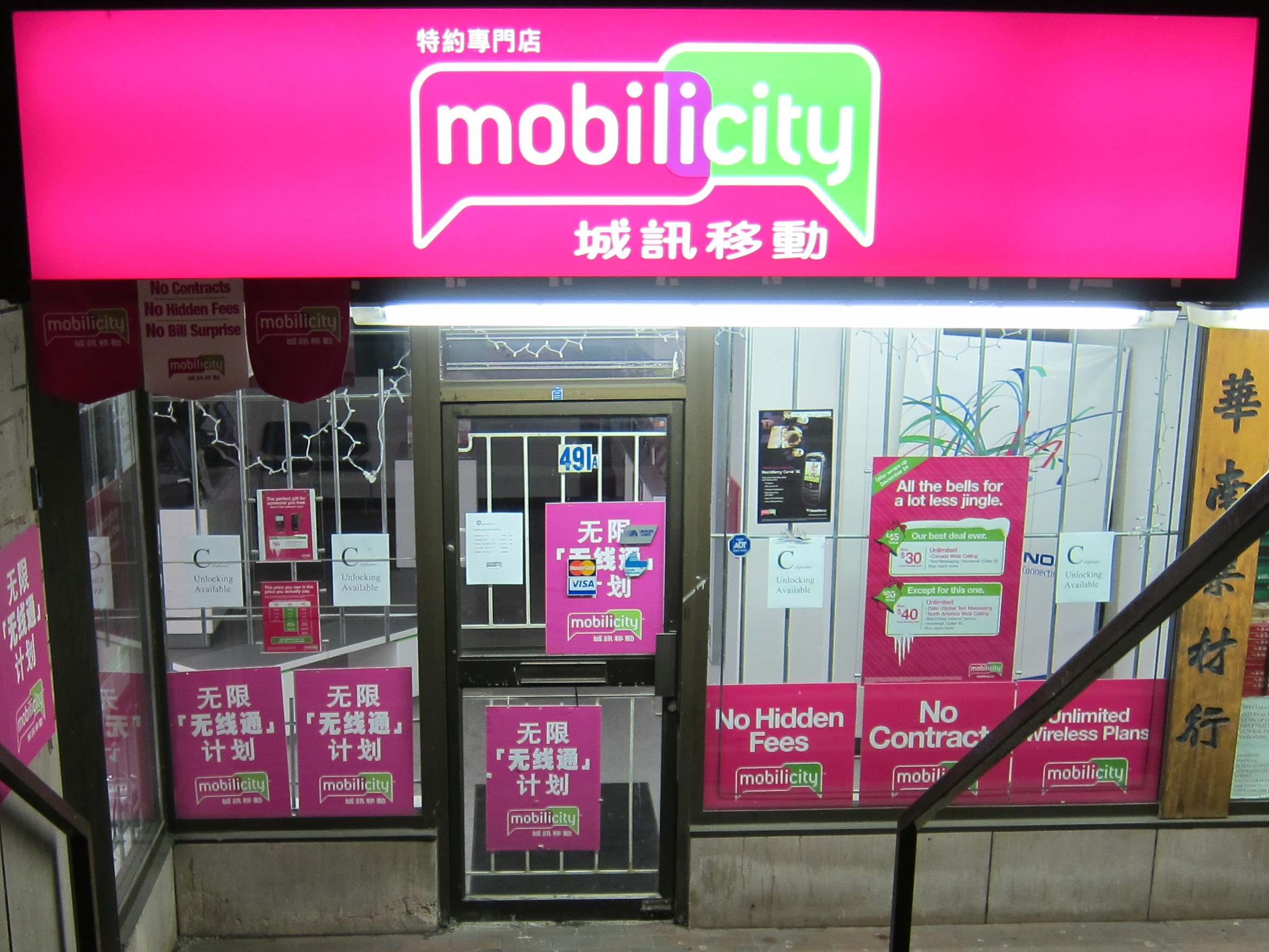
4 - Chinatown, Toronto store

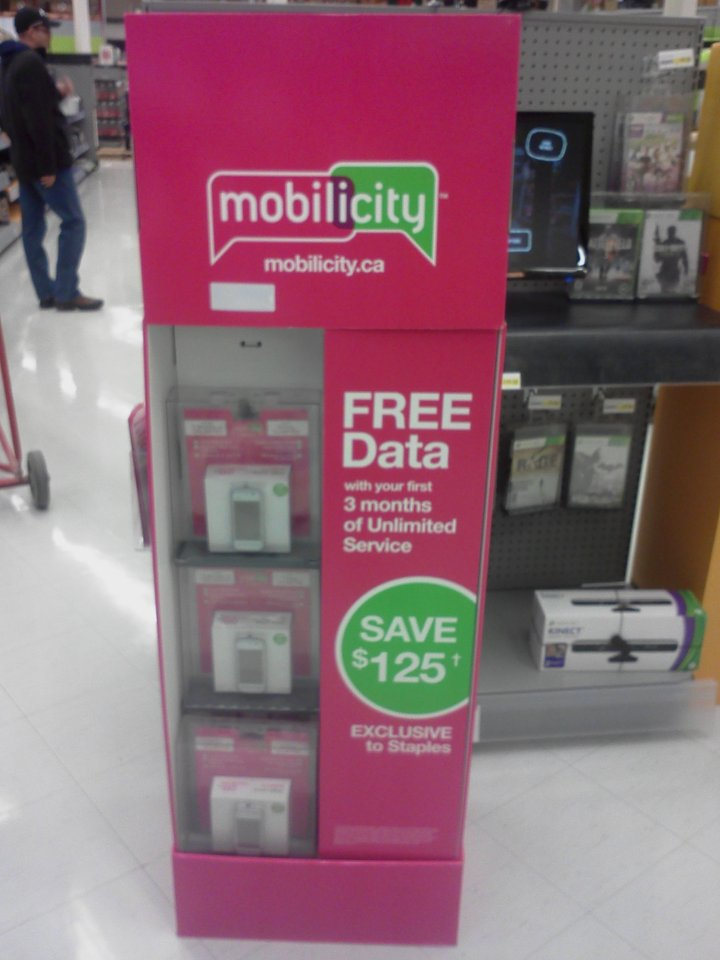
5 - Staples Canada
1. The Samsung C414Y is a basic flip feature phone available at Mobilicity.
2. The Huawei E1691 is a USB mobile broadband modem. The Wind Mobile model is shown. Mobilicity's model is identical, but colored white instead of black and featuring Mobilicity's logo instead of Wind's.
3. Otis (green male) and Alexis (purple female) are alien mascots used to advertise Mobilicity's products.
4. A Mobilicity authorized dealer in Toronto catering to the Chinese population in the city.
5. The Huawei E1691 is a USB mobile broadband modem providing a mobile broadband connection.
