= List of AWS-1 devices =

This is a list of devices capable of communicating on an AWS-1 network. AWS-1 (Advanced Wireless Services) is a wireless communication frequency band of the radio spectrum. It is used for transmission of voice, data, video, and messaging over a cellular network. AWS-1 is used in various countries of the Americas. It replaces the spectrum formerly allocated to Multipoint Multichannel Distribution Service (MMDS).

== Compatible devices ==
A partial list of phones, smartphones, tablets and modems that support the AWS-1 frequency on a UMTS network:

=== Alcatel ===
- OT-908S
- OT-918S
- OT-981A
- OT-990S
- OT-991
- OT-995
- One Touch Fierce
- One Touch Scribe X
- One Touch Scribe HD-LTE
- Alcatel Pop Icon
- Alcatel M'POP
- Alcatel D3 (Wind Mobile)

=== Apple ===
- iPhone 5, model A1428
- iPhone 5c, models A1436 and A1532
- iPhone 5s, models A1453 and A1533
- iPhone 6, models A1549 and A1522
- iPhone SE (1st generation), models A1662, A1723, A1724
- iPad Air, model A1475
- iPad mini with Retina Display, model A1490
- iPhone 7 and 7 plus purchased in North America

=== Asus ===
- Google Nexus 7
- PadFone 2
- Google Nexus 7 (2013)
- Fonepad 7
- ZenFone 2 (WW/TW Firmware phones from Taiwan/China do NOT work on Mobilicity)
- ZenFone 3

=== BlackBerry ===
- Q5 (only SQR100-1)
- Q10 (only SQN100-5)
- Z10 (only STL-100-3 (RFK121LW))
- Z30 (only STA-100-5)
- Bold 9700
- Bold 9780
- Bold 9790
- Bold 9900
- Curve 9300
- Curve 9320
- Curve 9360
- Curve 9380
- Pearl 9100
- Torch 9810
- Torch 9860
- BlackBerry Passport
- BlackBerry Classic
- BlackBerry Leap
- DTEK 50

Many of the above listed BlackBerry devices have multiple versions, only one of each being AWS compatible.

=== BLU ===
- Quattro 4.5 model D440
- Quattro 4.5 HD model D450
- Quattro 5.7 HD model D460
- Studio 5.0 LTE model Y530Q
- Studio 5.0 II
- Studio Mini LTE
- Studio XL
- Studio 6 HD
- Studio 7 ll
- Win JR (W410U)
- Win HD (W510U)
- Win HD LTE (X150Q)
- Energy X 2

=== Dell ===
- Venue Pro
- Streak Pro model D43

=== Garmin ===
- Nüvifone A50 / Garminfone

=== HTC ===
- Google Nexus One
- HTC 8X
- HTC Desire 601
- HTC 8S Wind Mobile version
- HD2
- HD7
- G2
- Amaze
- HTC Flyer (3G version)
- Incredible S
- Maple/Snap
- myTouch 4G/Panache
- One (M7)
- One (M8)
- One (M9)
- One S
- Radar
- Sensation (Z710E only)
- Sensation XE
- T-Mobile Touch Pro2
- T-Mobile G1
- HTC Wildfire S
- HTC EVO 3D

Many of the above listed HTC phones have more than one version. The consumer must ensure that he or she purchases the correct version that supports the AWS frequency.

=== Huawei ===
- E138 USB modem
- E173 USB modem
- E181 USB modem
- E1691 USB modem
- E3276 LTE USB modem
- E366 21.6 Mbit/s USB modem
- E372 42 Mbit/s USB modem
- E573 mobile Wi-Fi HotSpot modem (7.2 Mbit/s-down/5.76 Mbit/s-up)
- E583C mobile Wi-Fi HotSpot modem (7.2 Mbit/s-down/5.76 Mbit/s-up)
- E586E mobile Wi-Fi HotSpot modem (21.6 Mbit/s-down/5.76 Mbit/s-up)
- E587 mobile Wi-Fi HotSpot modem (43.2 Mbit/s-down/5.76 Mbit/s-up)
- Ascend D1 Quad XL
- Ascend G312
- Ascend G615
- Ascend Mate
- Ascend P1
- Ascend P1 LTE (only U9202L-3)
- Ascend P6
- Ascend P6S
- P8
- Ascend W1
- Ascend X
- U1250
- U2801
- U2900
- U3200
- U3220
- U5300
- U6020
- U6150
- U7519 marketed as T-Mobile Tap
- U8100-9
- U8350
- U8500 IDEOS
- U8651T
- U8667
- U8820
- Ascend D1 XL U9500E
- Ascend D quad
- Ascend P1 XL U9200E
- Ascend P1s
- Ascend D quad XL
- Honor 2
- Huawei Ascend Mate
- Ascend Mate2 4G model MT2-L03
- Ascend G6 4G
- T-Mobile myTouch Q 2
- Ascend G7-L03
- GR5W
- Mate 9 (MHA-L29)
- P9 (EVA-DL00)

=== Lenovo ===
- K900

=== LG ===
- LG V20
- LG G4
- LG G3 (D851 t-mobile version-or D852G)
- LG G2
- C729
- dLite
- F4N
- GU927
- LG Optimus Black
- Optimus 2X (P990)
- T-Mobile G2X (P999) (USA)
- Optimus 3D (P920)
- Optimus 4X HD - P880g (Canada: Wind, Videotron)
- Optimus T
- Sentio
- Google Nexus 4
- Google Nexus 5
- Google Nexus 5X
- LG V909 Tablet
- T-Mobile G-Slate
- Optimus L9 P769
- Optimus F3
- Optimus F6 D500
- Optimus F3Q
- LG G Stylo

=== Meizu ===
- MX 2-core
- MX 4-core

=== Motorola ===
- Atrix HD
- Charm
- Cliq
- CLIQ XT also known as Quench
- Cliq2
- Defy
- Google Nexus 6
- Master (XT605)
- Motorola Milestone XT720
- Moto G (2013) (US Version)
- Moto G (2014) (US Version)
- Moto X (Developer Edition/T-Mobile)
- Moto X Segunda Genración 2014 XT1097
- Motorola RAZR V
- Motorola XT300 also known as Spice (launched late Dec 2010)
- Motorola Droid Pro Plus only version MB632
- Moto E Dual TV XT1025
- Moto G Dual SIM
- Moto G 3rd Gen XT 1549

Some of the above listed Motorola phones have more than one version, only one of which is AWS compatible.

=== Nokia ===
- Asha 302 (RM-884 variant only)
- Asha 303
- Asha 311
- Lumia 520
- Lumia 635 (RM-975 variant only)
- Lumia 710
- Lumia 735 (RM-1039 variant only)
- Lumia 810
- Lumia 920 (RM-820 variant only)
- Lumia 925 (RM-893 variant only)
- Lumia 1020 (RM-876 variant only)
- Lumia 1320 (RM-995 variant only)
- Lumia 1520 (RM-940 variant only)
- 3555b (RM-257 only)
- 3710
- 500
- 5230 (RM-593 variant only)
- 603
- 6263
- 700
- 701
- 808 PureView
- C5-04
- C6-01 (both RM-601 and RM-675)
- C7-00
- E6-00
- E7-00
- E73 Mode
- N8
- N9
- N900
- N950 (developer device)
- X7-00 (RM-707 only)

=== OnePlus ===
- One (International Edition, Chinese Edition doesn't work with UMTS Band IV)
- Two (North America model only)
- 3/3t (North America model only)

=== Oppo ===
- Find 7 (US Version)
- Find 7a (US Version)
- Find 5 (US Version)
- N1

=== Option ===
- iCon 452

=== Samsung ===
- Samsung Galaxy Note 4 (SM-N910T)
- Samsung Galaxy S III (SGH-T999/T999L/T999V)
- Samsung Galaxy Note II (SGH-T889)
- Samsung Galaxy S4 (T-Mobile USA) (SGH-M919/M919V)
- SCH-R970 Samsung Galaxy S4 (Cricket, C Spire, MetroPCS, U.S. Cellular)
- Samsung Galaxy Note II (SGH-T889/T889V)
- SGH-T899M Ativ S
- Samsung Galaxy S5 (SM-G900T/G900W8)
- Samsung Galaxy Note III (SM-N900T/N900W8)
- Samsung Galaxy S6
- Samsung Galaxy Grand Prime (SM-G530W) (Wind Mobile Canada, T-Mobile USA)
- SGH-T159
- SGH-T259
- SGH-T359 :) Smiley
- SGH-T399 Galaxy Light
- SGH-C414Y and SGH-C414V (FCC ID: A3LSGHC414Y, not A3LSGHC414)
- SGH-T379
- SGH-T469 Gravity 2
- SGH-T479 Gravity 3 (Not the SGH-T479B)
- SGH-T499 Dart
- SGH-T559 Comeback
- T599 Galaxy Exhibit
- SGH-T636 (Cincinnati Bell)
- SGH-T639 Noel* SGH-T659
- SGH-T669 "Gravity T" / "Gravity Touch" (but not the SGH-T669B)
- SGH-T679 Exhibit II 4G (T-Mobile)
- T699 Galaxy S Relay 4G
- SGH-T749 Highlight
- SGH-T759 Exhibit
- T769 Galaxy S Blaze 4G
- SGH-T779 Samsung Galaxy Tab 2 (10.1)
- SGH-T819
- SGH-T839 Sidekick 4G
- T879 Galaxy Note
- SGH-I317M Samsung Galaxy Note II
- SGH-T919 Behold
- SGH-T929 Memoir
- SGH-T939 Behold II
- SGH-T959 Galaxy S "Vibrant"
- SGH-T959V Galaxy S 4G (not SGH-T959P AKA Telus version)
- SGH-T989 Galaxy S II (T-Mobile USA)
- SGH-T989D Galaxy S II X (Telus Canada)
- GT-i9250 Google Galaxy Nexus
- GT-S5603
- Google Nexus S Model GT-I9020T (FCC ID: AL3GTI9020T or A3LGTI9020, not A3L9020A)
- Caliber
- Code
- Freeform
- Freeform II
- Galaxy (i7500)
- Galaxy Q
- Galaxy Tab™
- Stunt
- T369

=== Social ===
- X500 - Drive

=== Sony ===
- Xperia ion LT28h
- Xperia ion LTE LT28i
- Xperia M - C1904, C2004
- Xperia L - C2104
- Xperia E3 - D2206
- Xperia Acro HD
- Xperia SP - C5302
- Xperia T LT30p
- Xperia T LTE LT30a
- Xperia Z - C6602/C6606
- Xperia Z Ultra
- Xperia ZL - C6502/C6506
- Xperia ZR
- Xperia Z1
- Xperia Z1 Compact
- Xperia Z1s
- Xperia Z2 - D6502/D6503/D6543
- Xperia Z2 Tablet SGP521
- Xperia TX LT29i
- Xperia ZR C5502
- Xperia M2 D2306
- Xperia T2 Ultra D5306
- Xperia Z3 - D6603
- Xperia Z3 Compact
- Xperia Z3 Tablet SGP621

=== Sony Ericsson ===
- TM506
- TM717 Equinox
- X10i

=== Zoom Telephonics ===
- Zoom 4597 3G+ Freedom Modem

=== ZTE ===
- ZTE Anthem
- ZTE Concord
- ZTE MF80
- ZTE MF93E

== See also ==
- Advanced Wireless Services
- UMTS frequency bands
