= Huawei U2801 =

Mobile phone

- Manufacturer: Huawei
- Type: Feature phone
- Operating system: Qualcomm BREW v4.0
- Storage: Onboard flash memory: 128 MB; Removable microSDHC: up to 8 GB
- Display: 160x120 px (0.0768 MP) TFT LCD, 1.8 in (46 mm),
- Input: Keypad; Microphone
- Camera: 0.3 MP, with CIF(176x144 px) video
- Connectivity: 3.5 mm jack TRRS; Bluetooth; mini-USB 2.0; Quad band: WCDMA 1700/2100; GSM 850/900/1800/1900; HSDPA; EDGE Class 12; GPRS Class 12; HSUPA
- Power: 900 mAh; Internal rechargeable removable battery, talk time: 230 minutes (3G), standby time: 350 hours (3G)
- Weight: 90 g (3.2 oz)
- Predecessor: Huawei U1250

The Huawei U2801 is a mobile phone manufactured by Huawei Inc. and is sold in Canada by Wind Mobile and formerly by Mobilicity. In Venezuela was made by Orinoquia, a company formed jointly by the Venezuelan government and sold by Movilnet as Orinoquia U2801.

== History ==
Wind Mobile and Mobilicity added the Huawei U2801 to their respective lineups in late 2011 as an affordable phone. At Wind, it replaced the Huawei U1250 as the operator's basic candy bar feature phone.

== Features ==
The Huawei U2801 is a simple POS phone with some multimedia features. It has a 3.5mm headphone jack for listening to MP3 audio files. The dedicated music key opens the Music menu, allowing one to select which files or station they would like to listen to. While in the Music menu, the rewind, fast forward and play/pause functions can be accessed by pressing on the left, right and selection buttons, respectively.

A very basic camera is included for taking quick pictures and videos. The pictures can have a size of up to 0.3 megapixels, while the camcorder is limited to a low QCIF resolution of 176x144 pixels. There is no dedicated camera button, but the camera may be accessed by pressing the right key on the clock screen or by selecting Camera on the main menu. The selection button is used to take pictures or to start and stop video recording.

== Networks ==
In Canada, the Huawei U2801 is sold at Wind Mobile. It is also compatible with many networks in that country, including GSM and AWS-based HSPA+. Once unlocked, it may also be used on Rogers Wireless, Chatr, Fido, Vidéotron Mobile, Mobilicity and Eastlink Wireless.

In Venezuela was made by Orinoquia, a company formed jointly by the Venezuelan government and sold at Movilnet as Orinoquia U2801.

== Criticism ==
After the Huawei U2801 was first launched, many people were accidentally pocket dialling 911 due to the SOS feature that can be accessed by pressing the top right corner button. Then to call, just press the top left corner button. This dangerous feature that could not be turned off, which resulted in many complaints to Huawei. Huawei fixed this problem by removing the SOS feature. the updated U2801 has both left and right corner buttons as keyboard shortcuts, it was released in 2014.
