= Video Girl =

Video Girl may refer to:

- Video Girl (album), a 2009 album by VenetianPrincess
- "Video Girl", a song by FKA Twigs from their 2014 album, LP1
- "Video Girl", a song by the Jonas Brothers from the album, A Little Bit Longer
- Video Girl, a 2011 film featuring Meagan Good
- Video Girl Ai, a manga series by Masakazu Katsura
- Video Girl Len, a manga series by Masakazu Katsura and sequel to Video Girl Ai
- Video vixen, a female model who appears in hip-hop-oriented music videos
