= Samsung Gravity (original) =

Mobile phone model

Samsung SGH-T459 (Gravity)
- Gravity with full keypad visible
- Manufacturer: Samsung Electronics
- Availability by region: November 7, 2008
- Successor: Samsung Gravity 2
- Related: Samsung Behold
- Compatible networks: GSM 850/900/1800/1900 MHz
- Form factor: bar, slide
- Dimensions: 4.53 x 2.07 x 0.70" (115mm x 53mm x 18mm)
- Weight: 4.30 oz (122 g)
- Memory: 60 MB
- Removable storage: microSD
- Battery: Lithium Ion 800 mAh 6 hours (360 mins) of Talk time, 300 hours (13 days) of Stand-by time
- Rear camera: 1.3 megapixel
- Display: 176 X 220 px, 262,144 colors
- Connectivity: GPRS / EDGE Class 10, Bluetooth 2.0

Samsung SGH-T349
- Manufacturer: Samsung Electronics
- Availability by region: May 20th, 2009
- Compatible networks: GSM America bound phone, supporting both frequencies and one European/Asian for roaming (850/1800/1900 MHz)
- Form factor: bar
- Dimensions: 4.49 x 1.97 x 0.53 inches (114 x 50 x 13 mm)
- Weight: 3.20 oz (91 g)
- Memory: 50 MB
- Removable storage: microSD
- Battery: Lithium Ion 800 mAh 7 hours (420 mins) of Talk time, 300 hours (13 days) of Stand-by time
- Rear camera: 1.3 megapixel, Multi shot
- Front camera: n/a
- Display: 176 x 220 px, 262,144 colors, TFT
- External display: n/a
- Connectivity: GPRS / EDGE Class 10, Bluetooth 2.0
- Data inputs: predictive text
- Other: double-tap keypad

The Samsung Gravity (SGH-T459) is a slider feature phone with a full QWERTY keypad. It was first released for T-Mobile USA. The Samsung SGH-T349 is a mobile phone available through T-Mobile and announced on May 20, 2009 that has many similarities to the original Gravity.

== Features ==
Back of the Gravity, battery cover, camera lens visible

Although the Gravity's main feature is its QWERTY keyboard, there are other capabilities included with it.

Applications and games

From T-Zones, one can download Java applications that run on mobile phones and store them in the phone.

Music player

Supports MP3 file formats, and can be added via Universal Serial Bus (USB), MicroSD, or Bluetooth. It is also possible to listen to music with a wireless Bluetooth headset. Songs can be set as a ringtone or alarm tone.

Camera

The Samsung Gravity has a basic 1.3-megapixel camera with digital zoom, multi-shot, and camcorder capabilities. Photos can be set as wallpaper or Caller ID.

== Availability ==
In the United States, this phone was released on T-Mobile USA. In Canada, the Gravity 2 was previously available first on Rogers Wireless, then later on its Chatr brand. Both carriers have discontinued the device in 2011. They now carry other QWERTY feature phones instead.

== See also ==
- Samsung Blast (SGH-T729)
- Samsung Behold
