= Public Mobile =

Canadian wireless carrier, a subsidiary of Telus

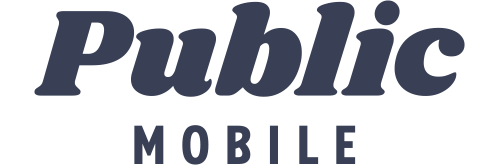
- Type: Subsidiary
- Industry: Mobile virtual network operator
- Founded: March 18, 2010; 16 years ago
- Headquarters: Toronto, Ontario, Canada
- Products: Mobile telephony
- Services: HSPA, LTE, 5G, mobile broadband, SMS, telephony
- Parent: Telus
- Website: www.publicmobile.ca

Public Mobile is a Canadian self-serve mobile brand which is owned by Telus. Launched on March 18, 2010, Public Mobile was one of several new Canadian cellphone providers that started in 2009–10 after a federal government initiative to encourage competition in the wireless sector.

Public Mobile was acquired by Telus in October 2013. As of August 8, 2014, Public Mobile operates as a mobile virtual network operator on the Telus Mobility network. On August 31, 2015, Public Mobile "relaunched" to the public under a beta program providing free SIM cards and three tiers of BYOD plans starting with a 10-day, 30-day or a 90-day period, all of which have respective options of Talk, Text and Data. The service is not charged by minute, as with other prepaid providers. Instead, customers select which types of unlimited talk and text service and which data caps they would like for a 10-, 30-, or 90-day period.

== History ==
=== As an independent CDMA carrier (May 2010 – August 2013) ===
Public Mobile logo used from 2010 – 2015

Public Mobile paid $52 million to purchase Personal Communications Service G Band spectrum during the 2008 Industry Canada Spectrum auction. It was the only company in the world to deploy this spectrum. Other participants in the 2008 Spectrum auction include Wind Mobile and Mobilicity purchasing the different Advanced Wireless Services (AWS) spectrum for their networks in Southern Ontario, while Vidéotron Mobile purchased AWS to provide service throughout the province of Quebec.

Public Mobile opened stores on March 18, 2010, in Toronto and Montreal. The network was deployed in Toronto on May 26, 2010, and in Montreal on June 25, 2010.

Public Mobile added 40,000 new lines throughout Q3 2011, bringing the number of total active subscriptions to 154,000.

The UMX Max Android smartphone and a 3G network were launched by Public Mobile on November 22, 2011. The ZTE N762 was launched on December 5, 2011. In December 2011, retail presence for Public Mobile has been expanded to Walmart Canada and Zellers stores. Roaming in the United States on Sprint Nextel's network was also launched during that month. Rates for this service are the same as Canadian roaming rates. Public Mobile added 45,000 new subscriptions in Q4 2011, finishing the year with 199,000 active customers.

During the Super Bowl season, Public Mobile purchased Super Bowl advertising airtime in Canada for its "Roam Rage" campaign. On February 7, 2012, Reuters reported that Public Mobile has 199,000 subscribers. In February, Public Mobile also increased its monthly fee for the low-end Unlimited Talk plan by $4/month. In August, Public Mobile launched Siren Music, an unlimited music service for their Android smartphones Similarly to competitor Mobilicity, Public Mobile started its Boxing Week sales early in an attempt to successfully finish the fourth quarter of 2012.

On April 10, 2013, Public Mobile announced that it would join Mobilicity and Wind Mobile in withdrawing from the Canadian Wireless Telecommunications Association, citing a bias towards Canada's national carriers. On June 6, 2013, Public Mobile announced that Thomvest Seed Capital and Cartesian Capital acquired Public Mobile. Thomvest becomes the controlling shareholder in the company. The commitment of the Thomvest and Cartesian was to fund Public Mobile to a cash flow positive position and participate in the upcoming 700 MHz auction.

=== As a Telus Mobility MVNO (October 2013 – present) ===
On October 23, 2013, Industry Canada approved an offer by Telus to acquire Public Mobile and its spectrum for an undisclosed amount. Following the closure of the deal, Public Mobile's customers were migrated to Telus' network. Unlike its failed attempt to acquire Mobilicity, Telus was legally able to acquire Public Mobile because the Personal Communications Service G band was not subject to restrictions present for AWS spectrum owners, allowing the PCS spectrum to be bought by an incumbent carrier. Public Mobile released its seventh and last CDMA Android smartphone, the SangFei Elevation, on November 9, 2013. On November 29, 2013, the federal Competition Bureau also approved Telus' offer, saying that "non-incumbents in areas served by Public Mobile would likely continue to 'provide effective competition'" after the sale. A condition of the sale was that Telus offer Public Mobile's existing plans until at least the end of 2014, which they continued to do under the Public Mobile brand.

On March 27, 2014, Public Mobile customers were notified that Public Mobile's existing CDMA network would be sunset by Telus in August 2014, and that customers wishing to continue service would need to buy phones compatible with Telus' 4G network. On September 4, 2014, it was announced that Public Mobile would transition toward being a digital-only "self-serve value brand" under Telus.

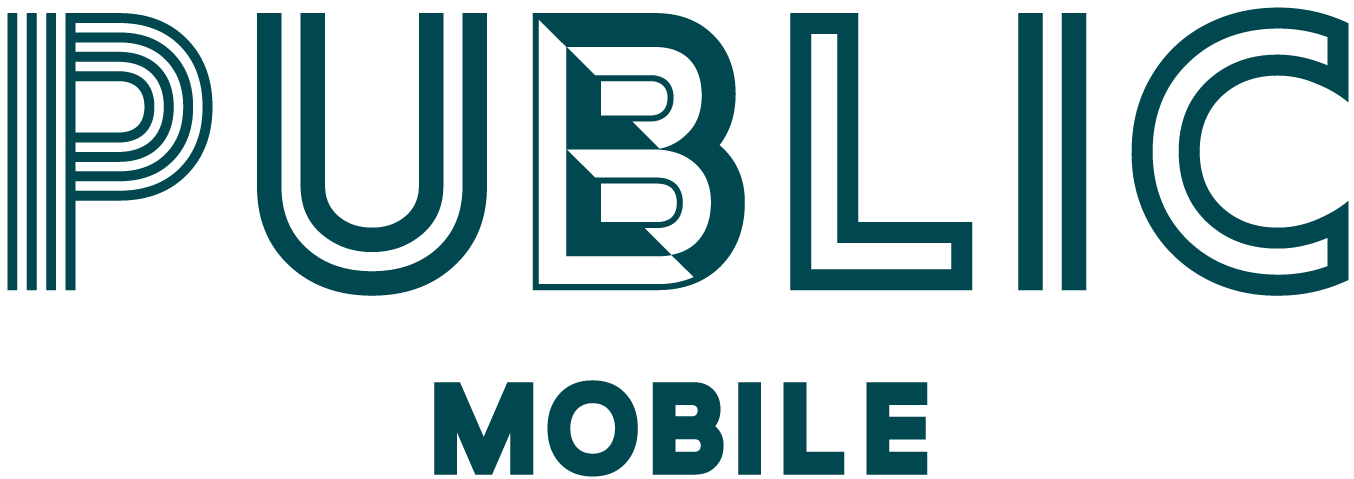
Public Mobile logo used from 2019 - 2023

In February 2015, Public Mobile reorganized as a "bring your own phone" value brand. The new plans included options to customize different aspects of service (talk, SMS, and mobile data). Additional discounts were introduced for customer loyalty (per 12 consecutive months, capped at 60 consecutive months), automatic credit (including Visa Debit) payments, referral marketing and participating on the brand's support forum.

In November 2015, Public Mobile announced it would be offering a selection of devices by way of a partnership with Orchard, a Toronto-based smartphone refurbisher and reseller. The partnership is unprecedented in Canada as most mobile carriers are required to strike deals with hardware manufacturers before they are able to supply their subscribers with devices. In particular, Apple has direct-distribution agreements with all other national carriers with the exception of Wind and Public Mobile.

On February 15, 2018, Public Mobile sent a text message to subscribers of their 12 GB for $120 plan that starting on March 20, 2018, the cost of their then lifetime plans were to increase from $40 per month to $50 per month. In the same text message, they offered subscribers the chance to migrate to Koodo by March 15, 2018 to keep the same pricing. As many subscribers, had pre-authorized payment, referral and loyalty credits, their monthly price was below $40. This, in addition to being told that the price and plan would be valid as long as the customers were active, led to a large online backlash, where many accused Public Mobile's parent company Telus of forcing customers off of pre-paid towards post-paid plans. As a result, many subscribers contacted online media outlets and filed complains with the CCTS (Commission for Complaints for Telecom-Television Services) and made posts on Public Mobile's user forum as well as Redflagdeals to encourage others to also file complaints. As a result of the online backlash and large number of complaints, on February 16, 2018, subscribers received another text message from Public Mobile that the planned rate increase would be cancelled.

In April 2019, Public Mobile expanded distribution to include 9 retail locations in Quebec, Alberta and British Columbia.

=== 2023 rebrand ===
In May 2023, Public Mobile underwent a significant rebrand, during which it introduced 5G wireless plans, launched a dedicated mobile application for account management, and added eSIM activation support. The 5G plans operate on the TELUS 5G network and are offered at various data tiers alongside existing 4G LTE options.

=== 2024 Legacy Rewards removal ===
On March 6, 2024, Public Mobile posted an announcement on their Community Forum about Upcoming Changes to the old rewards program. Before the change took place, customers received data bonuses of 240 GB if on a $29/month plan or higher. Customers who were on a $28/month and lower plan got either 50 GB or 5 GB. The bonus was automatically added to customers' accounts by March 31st, 2024, and expired in 150 days.

== Services ==
Public Mobile offers exclusively prepaid wireless plans with no fixed-term contracts. Plans are available across 3G, 4G LTE, and 5G speed tiers. Canada–United States–Mexico roaming plans are also available. Customers activate and manage their accounts through the Public Mobile website or mobile application, with no company-owned retail storefronts. SIM cards and eSIM activations are available online.

== Network ==
Public Mobile operates on the TELUS 5G and LTE networks, offering customers access to 3G, 4G, and 5G speed tiers depending on their selected plan. All subscriptions include unlimited Canada-wide talk and text.

Public Mobile users can roam on Rogers Wireless 3G & 4G LTE network in select areas, provided Public Mobile has no service but Rogers Wireless does.

=== 3G retirement ===
In 2026, Public Mobile announced the retirement of its 3G network, with a national shutdown scheduled for March 1, 2027. The retirement was communicated directly to affected customers and is intended to facilitate network capacity improvements on 4G LTE and 5G infrastructure.

=== Former ===
Built by ZTE Corporation, Public Mobile's CDMA network was based on CDMA2000 1XRTT technology with the 3G Evolution-Data Optimized (EV-DO) standard enabled. It was capable of voice, SMS and mobile broadband. It used the G block, one 5 + 5 MHz paired spectrum in the range of 1910–1915 MHz and 1990–1995 MHz, which was part of the Personal Communications Service (PCS) spectrum deployed by most major operators since the early 1990s across North America. However, Public was the only carrier with service commercially deployed in the PCS G band. Such frequencies have the same operational characteristics as all other PCS bands.

EV-DO speeds on Public Mobile's CDMA network could theoretically reach up to 3.1 Mbit/s for downloads and 1.8 Mbit/s for uploads. TestMy.net reported real world speeds reaching a maximum of 2.47 Mbit/s for downloads and 1.1 Mbit/s for uploads, with typical speeds of 0.699 Mbit/s for downloads and 0.464 Mbit/s for uploads.

The CDMA network provided coverage from Bowmanville to Burlington in the Greater Toronto area, as well as the City of Hamilton, QEW/420 corridor (and surrounding areas) of the Niagara Region, Montreal and its surrounding suburbs. In August 2012, Public Mobile expanded its coverage into parts of the Niagara Region and northwest of Toronto towards (but not including) Barrie.

On March 27, 2014, Public Mobile customers were notified that this network would be sunset by August 2014, and that customers wishing to continue service would need to buy phones compatible with Telus' higher quality 4G network. The last day of service on Public Mobile's CDMA network was August 8, 2014.

== Former devices ==
Public Mobile previously offered a small range of feature phones and Android smartphones. along with the Alcatel A392A feature phone and the BlackBerry Q5. After the reorganization into a Telus value brand in February 2015, Public Mobile no longer sells devices. Instead, Public Mobile has announced a partnership with a Toronto-based smartphone reseller named Orchard.

=== Feature phones ===
The Alcatel A392A was the only HSPA+ feature phone offered. It is a simple flip phone.

=== Android devices ===
From November 2011 to November 2013, Public Mobile has released a total of seven CDMA and Ev-DO smartphones powered by the Android operating system. Since August 2014, these devices can no longer be used on Public's network. The following is a comparison table:

		UMX MAX	ZTE N762	ZTE Warp	Kyocera Rise	ZTE Fury	ZTE Warp Sequent	SangFei Elevation
CPU		0.6 GHz		1.0 GHz			1.4 GHz	1.0 GHz
RAM		415 MB	256 MB	512 MB			768 MB	
Storage		158 MB	512 MB	4 GB	2 GB	4 GB		
Camera	Rear	3.2 MP	2.0 MP	5.0 MP	3.2 MP	5.0 MP		
Camera	Front	0.3 MP	—N/a	—N/a	—N/a	—N/a	1.3 MP	0.3 MP
Display	Size	3.2"	3.5"	4.3"	3.5"		4.3"	5"
Display	Resolution	320 x 240		800 x 480	480 x 320		960 x 540	800 x 480
OS version		Android 2.3 "Gingerbread"			Android 4.0 "Ice Cream Sandwich"			
Release date		November 23, 2011	December 5, 2011	August 15, 2012	October 16, 2012	August 2013	August 12, 2013	November 9, 2013
Reference								

In the summer of 2014, Public Mobile allowed customers to choose between four Android smartphones compatible with Telus Mobility's HSPA+ network: the Moto G, the Samsung Galaxy S III Mini, the Samsung Galaxy Ace II X and the Huawei Ascend Y330.

=== BlackBerry Q5 ===
The BlackBerry Q5 was the only non-Android smartphone to have ever been offered by Public Mobile. It features a hardware keyboard.

== See also ==
- List of Canadian mobile phone companies
