= AWS-1 =

AWS-1 may refer to:

- Marine Air Control Squadron 1, a United States Marine Corps squadron, initially named Air Warning Squadron 1
- A wireless telecommunications spectrum band; see List of AWS-1 devices
- An early search radar made by Plessey.
