= R (Vodafone Ltd) v Secretary of State for Business, Enterprise and Regulatory Reform =

R (Vodafone Ltd) v SS for Business
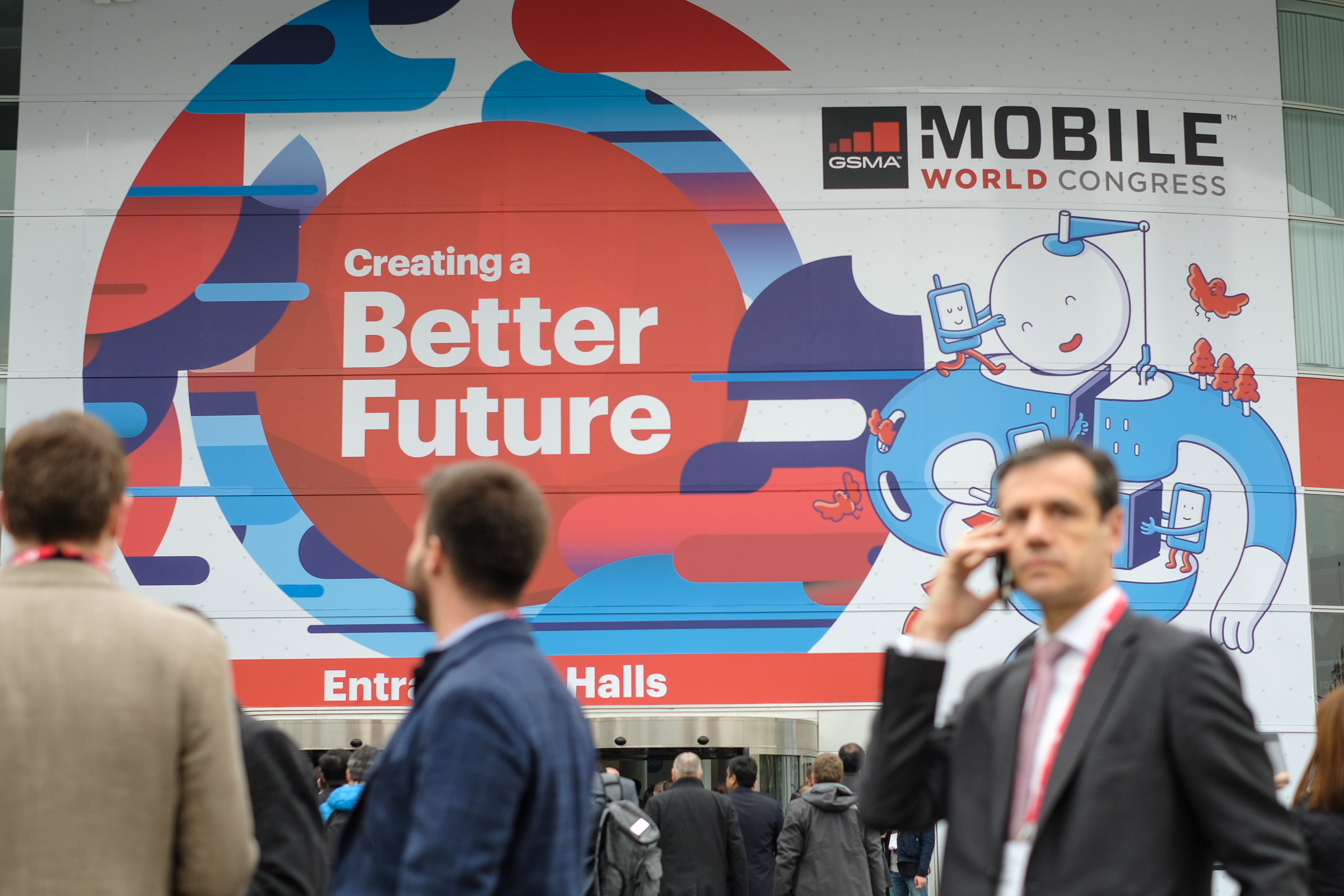
- The telecoms corporation lobby group, GSMA
- Court: Court of Justice
- Citation: (2010) C-58/08

Keywords
- Telecommunications

R (Vodafone Ltd) v Secretary of State for Business, Enterprise and Regulatory Reform (2010) C-58/08 is an EU law case relevant for UK enterprise law, concerning telecommunications.

== Facts ==
Vodafone Ltd (along with Telefónica O2 Europe plc, T-Mobile International AG and Orange Personal Communications Services Ltd, Hutchison 3G UK Ltd and the GSM Association) claimed that the Roaming Regulation 717/2007 lacked any legal basis under TEC art 95 (now TFEU art 114). This capped charges that mobile operators could make for roaming services on public mobile networks for voice calls between member states. They also argued it was disproportionate and offended the principle of subsidiarity, imposing a ceiling for wholesale charges per minute and for retail charges, plus an obligation to inform roaming customers about the charges.

AG Maduro gave an opinion that there was no lack of proportionality in price regulation.

== Judgment ==
The CJEU Grand Chamber rejected that the Regulation had no basis. TEC art 95 measures had to be adopted to genuinely improve the establishment and functioning of the internal market: R (British American Tobacco Investments Ltd) v Secretary of State for Health (2002) C-491/01. The Regulation ensured a coherent framework based on objective criteria for smooth market functioning, a high level of consumer protection and competition among networks. National measures were adopted that led to divergence in rules. It was legitimate.

51 According to settled case-law, the principle of proportionality is one of the general principles of Community law and requires that measures implemented through Community law provisions be appropriate for attaining the legitimate objectives pursued by the legislation at issue and must not go beyond what is necessary to achieve them (Joined Cases C‑453/03, C‑11/04, C‑12/04 and C‑194/04 ABNA and Others [2005] ECR I‑10423, paragraph 68 and the case-law cited).

52 With regard to judicial review of compliance with those conditions the Court has accepted that in the exercise of the powers conferred on it the Community legislature must be allowed a broad discretion in areas in which its action involves political, economic and social choices and in which it is called upon to undertake complex assessments and evaluations. Thus the criterion to be applied is not whether a measure adopted in such an area was the only or the best possible measure, since its legality can be affected only if the measure is manifestly inappropriate having regard to the objective which the competent institution is seeking to pursue (see, to that effect, Case C‑189/01 Jippes and Others [2001] ECR I‑5689, paragraphs 82 and 83; British American Tobacco (Investments) and Imperial Tobacco, paragraph 123; Alliance for Natural Health and Others, paragraph 52; and Case C‑558/07 S.P.C.M. and Others [2009] ECR I-0000, paragraph 42).

53 However, even though it has a broad discretion, the Community legislature must base its choice on objective criteria. Furthermore, in assessing the burdens associated with various possible measures, it must examine whether objectives pursued by the measure chosen are such as to justify even substantial negative economic consequences for certain operators (see, to that effect, Joined Cases C‑96/03 and C‑97/03 Tempelman and van Schaijk [2005] ECR I‑1895, paragraph 48; Case C‑86/03 Greece v Commission [2005] ECR I‑10979, paragraph 96; and Case C‑504/04 Agrarproduktion Staebelow [2006] ECR I‑679, paragraph 37).

54 The Court must therefore examine, on the basis of the abovementioned criteria, whether, as the claimants in the main proceedings argue inter alia, Regulation No 717/2007 infringes the principle of proportionality by reason of the fact that it does not confine itself to imposing ceilings for the wholesale charge, but also lays down ceilings for retail charges as well as an obligation to provide information about those charges to roaming customers.

55 In this respect, it must be recalled, first, that, before it drafted the proposal for the regulation, the Commission carried out an exhaustive study, the result of which is summarised in the impact assessment mentioned in paragraph 5 of this judgment. It follows that the Commission examined various options including, inter alia, the option of regulating retail charges only, or wholesale charges only, or both, and that it assessed the economic impact of those various types of regulation and the effects of different charging structures.

56 The fixing of ceilings on charges for the provision of retail roaming services through the Eurotariff provided for in Article 4(2) of Regulation No 717/2007 is aimed, inter alia, as is clear, in particular, from Article 1 and recitals 14 and 16 in the preamble to that regulation, at reducing the level of the charges that users of public mobile telephone networks have to pay for those services, in order to protect consumers.

57 Furthermore, it follows, in particular, from recital 19 in the preamble to Regulation No 717/2007 that the introduction of the Eurotariff ought to ensure that retail charges for Community-wide roaming services provide a more reasonable reflection of the underlying costs involved in the provision of those services than has been the case.

58 As is stated in paragraph 39 of this judgment, the average level of retail charges for a roaming call in the Community at the time of adoption of Regulation No 717/2007 was high and the relationship between costs and prices was not such as should have prevailed in fully competitive markets. Thus, the average retail charge for a roaming call was at that time EUR 1.15 per minute, or, in other words, as explained in the summary of the impact assessment, more than five times higher than the actual cost of providing the wholesale service.

59 The Eurotariff provided for in Article 4(2) of Regulation No 717/2007 has been set at a level that is significantly below that average charge. Furthermore, the ceilings on charges introduced in that article are set, as is clear from point 3 of the explanatory memorandum to the proposal for a regulation, in relation to the ceilings for the corresponding wholesale charges, so that the retail charges reflect more accurately the costs incurred by providers.

60 In those circumstances, the introduction by that provision of ceilings for retail charges must be considered to be appropriate for the purpose of protecting consumers against high levels of charges.

61 As to whether the measure at issue was necessary, it is argued that the said measure goes beyond what is necessary to achieve the objective pursued, given the competitive nature of retail markets. A less intrusive and more proportionate approach would have been to regulate wholesale charges only, while allowing competition in retail markets to bring retail prices down in the normal way, according to the rules of supply and demand, and leaving the NRAs free to intervene in cases where the markets were not functioning properly, on the basis of well‑established regulatory criteria.

62 In this regard, it is apparent, in particular, from recital 14 in the preamble to Regulation No 717/2007 that the Community legislature proceeded on the basis that reductions in wholesale prices might not be reflected in lower retail prices for roaming owing to the absence of incentives for that to happen.

63 Referring to the explanatory memorandum to the proposal for a regulation, which served as the basis for the Community legislature when it adopted Regulation No 717/2007, the Parliament and the Commission submit, inter alia, that regulation of the wholesale market for Community-wide roaming services alone would not have ensured that the reduction in wholesale charges would be reflected in retail charges, given that there was no competitive pressure on operators to pass on that reduction. Experience had shown that a reduction in wholesale charges did not necessarily lead to a reduction in retail charges.

64 In this respect, the Council stated that the legislature considered retail controls to be necessary, in particular because, in that specific area, competition at retail level took place mainly in terms of the complete retail package and, for the majority of consumers, roaming was only a small part of that package and accordingly not a critical consideration when they choose or change their provider.

65 The institutions that submitted observations to the Court also referred to the impact assessment, which shows that the dynamics of the roaming markets were considered to be complex and in the process of changing, so that there was a risk that a reduction in wholesale charges would not be reflected in retail charges. The impact assessment also shows that it would therefore be more prudent to regulate retail charges at the same time. Such a risk was moreover acknowledged by the ERG in paragraph 3.12 of its response of 22 March 2006, submitted during the public consultation that preceded the impact assessment, especially in respect of Member States with less competitive markets.

66 In addition, it is clear that regulation of wholesale charges alone would not have had a direct and immediate effect for consumers. By contrast, only the regulation of retail charges could improve the situation of consumers directly.

67 Further, it must be recalled that, as indicated in recital 13 in the preamble to Regulation No 717/2007, the Community legislature recognised that the measures adopted were exceptional and justified by the unique characteristics of the roaming markets.

68 In those circumstances, and particularly in the light of the broad discretion which the Community legislature has in the area at issue, which involves choices to be made of an economic nature, requiring complex assessments and evaluations, it could legitimately take the view that regulation of the wholesale market alone would not achieve the same result as regulation such as that at issue, which covers at the same time the wholesale market and the retail market, and that the latter was therefore necessary.

69 Finally, in the light of the importance of the objective of consumer protection within the context of Article 95(3) EC, intervention that is limited in time in a market that is subject to competition, which makes it possible, in the immediate future, to protect consumers against excessive prices, such as that at issue, even if it might have negative economic consequences for certain operators, is proportionate to the aim pursued.

70 Therefore, by adopting, in Article 4 of Regulation No 717/2007, ceilings for retail charges in addition to ceilings for wholesale charges, the Community legislature did not exceed the limits of the discretion it is recognised as having. The same is true of the obligation to provide information laid down in Article 6(3) of that same regulation, given that that provision reinforces the effectiveness of the regulation of retail charges and is therefore justified by the objective of consumer protection.

71 It follows that Articles 4 and 6(3) of Regulation No 717/2007 do not infringe the principle of proportionality.

Infringement of the principle of subsidiarity

72 It is appropriate to recall that the principle of subsidiarity is referred to in the second paragraph of Article 5 EC – and given actual definition by the Protocol on the application of the principles of subsidiarity and proportionality, annexed to the Treaty –, which provides that the Community, in areas which do not fall within its exclusive competence, is to take action only if and insofar as the objectives of the proposed action cannot be sufficiently achieved by the Member States and can therefore, by reason of the scale or effects of the proposed action, be better achieved by the Community. That protocol, in paragraph 5, also lays down guidelines for the purposes of determining whether those conditions are met.

73 As regards legislative acts, the protocol states, in paragraphs 6 and 7, that the Community is to legislate only to the extent necessary and that Community measures should leave as much scope for national decision as possible, consistent however with securing the aim of the measure and observing the requirements of the Treaty.

74 In addition, it states in its paragraph 3 that the principle of subsidiarity does not call into question the powers conferred on the European Community by the Treaty, as interpreted by the Court of Justice.

75 As regards Article 95 EC, the Court has held that the principle of subsidiarity applies where the Community legislature uses it as a legal basis, inasmuch as that provision does not give it exclusive competence to regulate economic activity on the internal market (British American Tobacco (Investments) and Imperial Tobacco, paragraph 179).

76 In this respect, it must be pointed out that the Community legislature, wishing to maintain competition among mobile telephone network operators, has, in adopting Regulation No 717/2007, introduced a common approach, in order in particular to contribute to the smooth functioning of the internal market, allowing those operators to act within a single coherent regulatory framework.

77 As is clear from recital 14 in the preamble to the regulation, the interdependence of retail and wholesale charges for roaming services is considerable, so that any measure seeking to reduce retail charges alone without affecting the level of costs for the wholesale supply of Community-wide roaming services would have been liable to disrupt the smooth functioning of the Community-wide roaming market. For that reason, the Community legislature decided that any action would require a joint approach at the level of both wholesale charges and retail charges, in order to contribute to the smooth functioning of the internal market in those services.

78 That interdependence means that the Community legislature could legitimately take the view that it had to intervene at the level of retail charges as well. Thus, by reason of the effects of the common approach laid down in Regulation No 717/2007, the objective pursued by that regulation could best be achieved at Community level.

79 Therefore, the provisions of Articles 4 and 6(3) of Regulation No 717/2007 are not invalidated by any infringement of the principle of subsidiarity.

== See also ==
- United Kingdom enterprise law
- EU law
