= Samsung SPH-M540 Rant =

Mobile phone model

Samsung Rant
- Manufacturer: Samsung
- Availability by region: Q4 2008
- Predecessor: Gravity
- Successor: Rant
- Compatible networks: CDMA 850/1900
- Form factor: Slider
- Dimensions: 2.05 x 4.44 x 0.71 inches (52 x 113 x 18 mm)
- Weight: 4.9 oz (139 g)
- Operating system: Sprint One-CLICK
- Memory: 24MB
- Removable storage: microSD
- Battery: Li - Ion, (5.6 hours (336 mins) of talk time)
- Rear camera: 2 Megapixels
- Front camera: No
- Display: 262,144 colors, TFT, 176 x 220 pixels, 2.10 inches
- External display: No
- Connectivity: microUSB, 2.0

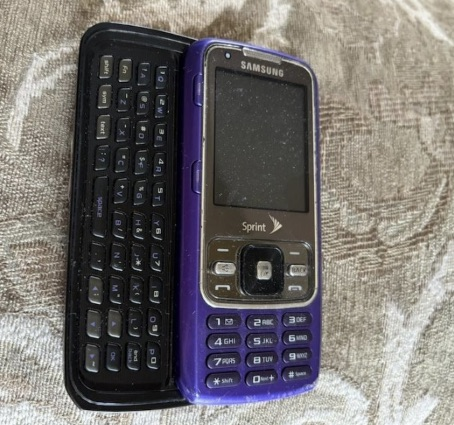
Samsung Rant in Purple

The Samsung SPH-M540 (Samsung Rant) is a slider phone designed by Samsung Mobile that is similar to the Samsung Gravity series. It was released in 2008. It was only offered through Sprint and cost around $49.99 at the time of release. It was generally considered a competitor to the LG Rumor. The phone was available in red, black and purple; The purple was only sold in Best Buy stores, while red and black were sold in Sprint retail stores.

== Features ==
Weight	4.9 ounces
Dimensions	2.05" x 4.44" x 0.71"
Display Technology	262K TFT
Display Size	2.1" diagonal
Display Resolution	176 x 220
Battery Talk time	Up to 5.6 hours
Camera Resolution	2 MP
Video	Yes
Music player	Yes
Messaging	SMS/Email/IM
Operating System	Sprint One-Click
Connectivity	Bluetooth/HTML Browser
