= Huawei U1250 =

Mobile phone manufactured by Huawei

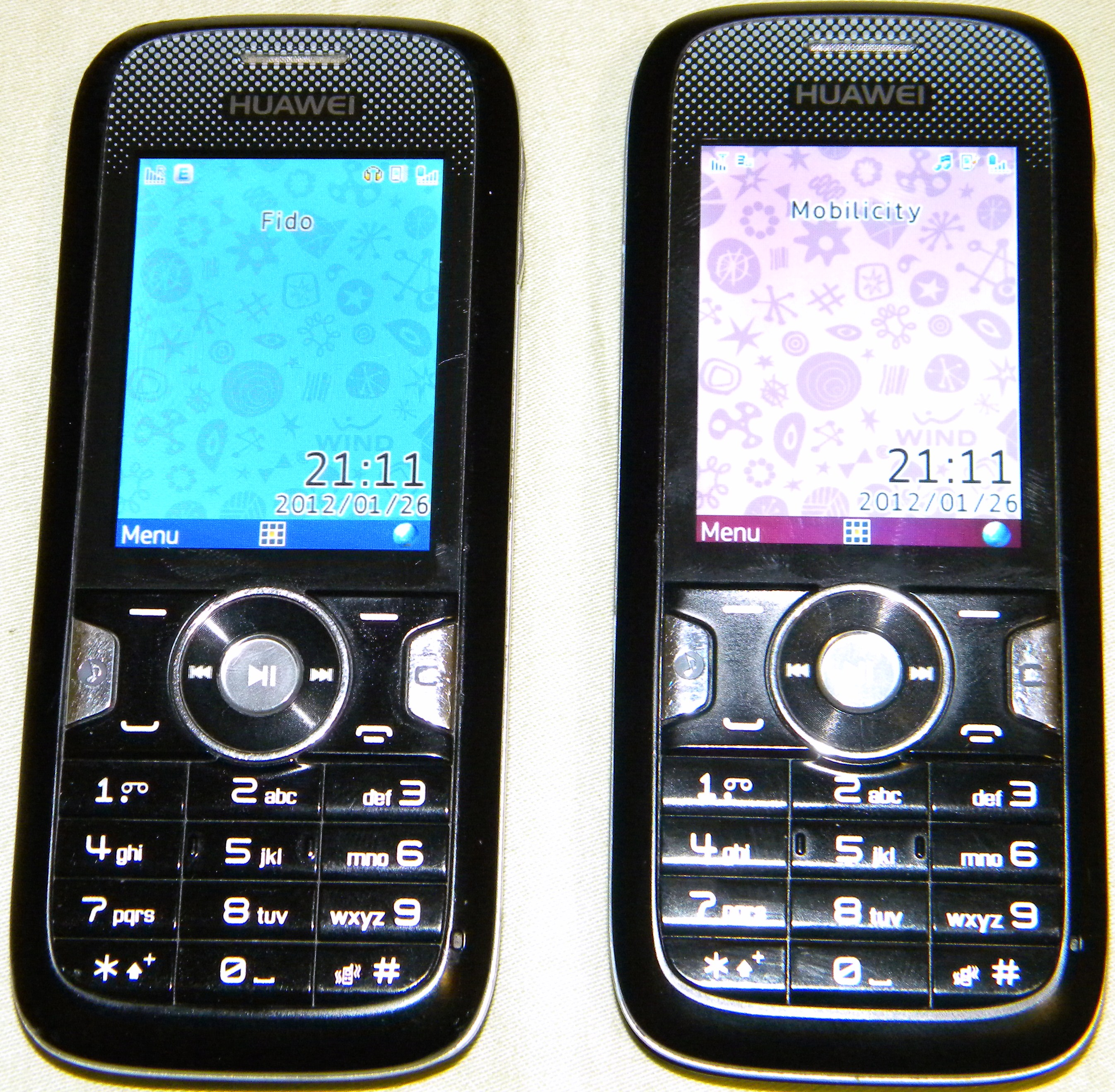
- Manufacturer: Huawei
- Type: Feature phone
- Released: February 2009; 17 years ago
- Operating system: Qualcomm BREW v4.0
- Storage: Onboard flash memory: 128 MB; Removable microSDHC: up to 8 GB
- Display: 240x320 px (0.0768 MP) TFT LCD, 2.0 in (51 mm), QVGA, 200 ppi, 256K colors
- Input: Keypad; Microphone
- Camera: 2.0 MP, with CIF(176x144 px) video
- Connectivity: 3.5 mm jack TRRS; Bluetooth; mini-USB 2.0; FM stereo receiver; Quad band: WCDMA Band 4 1700MHz; GSM 850/900/1800/1900; HSDPA; EDGE Class 12; GPRS Class 12; HSUPA
- Power: 900 mAh; Internal rechargeable removable battery, talk time: 230 minutes (3G), standby time: 350 hours (3G)
- Weight: 90 g (3.2 oz)

The Huawei U1250 is a mobile phone manufactured by Huawei, sold in Canada exclusively by Wind Mobile and by Virgin Mobile Australia as the Virgin VMX.

== History ==
Wind Mobile added the Huawei U1250 to its range in late 2010 as its cheapest phone. It was sometimes sold at a reduced price, as low as $19. The Huawei U2801 replaced the U1250 as Wind's basic candy bar feature phone.

The Huawei U1250 is also available in some countries outside Canada.

== Features ==
The Huawei U1250 is a simple basic phone with some multimedia features. It has a 3.5mm headphone jack for listening to FM radio or to MP3 audio files. The dedicated music key opens the Music menu, allowing users to select which files or station they would like to listen to. While there are rewind, fast forward and play/pause icons on the left, right and selection keys, respectively, those buttons can only be used for musical purposes while in the Music menu.

A very basic camera is included for taking pictures and videos. While the pictures can have a size of up to 2 megapixels, the camcorder is limited to a low QCIF resolution of 176x144 pixels. There is no dedicated camera button, but the camera may be accessed by pressing the fast forward (right) key on the clock screen or by selecting Camera on the main menu. The play (selection) button is used to take pictures, or to start and stop video recording.

This phone also has an answering machine feature allowing a 10-second greeting and 60 second recording. It can be found under the "Call settings" labelled as "Auto answer"

== Networks ==
In Canada, the Huawei U1250 is sold exclusively by Wind Mobile. However, it is compatible with many networks in that country, including GSM and AWS-based HSPA+. After getting the phone unlocked, it may also be used on Rogers Wireless, Chatr, Fido, and Videotron.

In Spain was sold by Yoigo and Sweden by Telia
