= Samsung Gravity series =

Series of mobile phones manufactured by Samsung

The Samsung Gravity series of mobile phones includes:

- Samsung Gravity, released November 7, 2008
- Samsung Gravity 2, released in August 2009
- Samsung Gravity 3, released in June 2010
- Samsung SGH-T669 (known as the "Gravity T" or "Gravity Touch"), a feature phone also released in June 2010
- Samsung Gravity Smart, an Android smartphone released June 22, 2011
- Samsung Gravity TXT, a feature phone released in August 2011
