= Orchard (company) =

Online smartphone reseller

Orchard Labs Inc.
- Formation: Toronto, Ontario (2013)
- Type: Private
- Headquarters: Toronto, Ontario
- Location: Toronto, Ontario
- Services: eCommerce, Mobile app
- Website: www.getorchard.com

Orchard Labs Inc. is a Canadian e-commerce company that buys and sells used smartphones across North America. The company develops and operates the Orchard mobile app, which allows consumers with iPhones to test, price, and register their iPhone for sale. Orchard then provides these iPhones for sale on its website. In 2015, Orchard launched a partnership with Public Mobile to supply the Canadian wireless carrier's customers with refurbished smartphones.

== History ==
Orchard was founded in Toronto, Canada by Bruno Wong, Alex Sebastian, and Hamza Javed. Following a beta launch of their mobile app in mid-2013, Orchard rolled out its services across Canada later that same year.

Orchard originally built their mobile app with the option to generate a free listing for sellers to share on social media and other online marketplace. Over the course of a series of soft launches, this option was dropped in favour of Orchard exclusively brokering sales on behalf of the iPhone's seller. iPhones were sold on a consignment basis, charging a smaller selling fee for the longer a seller waits before their iPhone sells.

In May 2015, Orchard expanded into the US market by establishing a physical location in San Francisco. In June, that same year, Orchard announced it received $500,000 in funding through the MLA48, Canada's first angel investment fund committed to providing a 48-hour turnaround on investment decisions. In 2017, Orchard ended its US sales after two years of business.

== Partnership with Public Mobile ==
After Telus acquired Public Mobile, it was relaunched as a value-conscious alternative to Telus' other wireless carrier brands. Part of this transition included the closing of any brick and mortar stores and discontinuing the sale of any handsets under the Public Mobile brand. Instead, Public Mobile announced a partnership with Orchard, whereby Orchard would supply Public customers with factory unlocked smartphones, pre-loaded with the carrier's APN settings. Orchard's Public Mobile smartphone lineup includes Apple, Samsung, HTC, and BlackBerry devices. Prior to this partnership, Orchard focused exclusively on iPhones.

Later, the partnership with Public Mobile ended.
