= Guy Laurence =

British businessman (born 1961)

Jonathan Guy Laurence (born 23 November 1961) is an English businessman, who was the chief executive of Premier League club Chelsea from 2018 to 2022. He was chief executive of Vodafone UK, and most recently president and CEO of Rogers Communications.

== Early life ==
He was born in Manchester. He went to King's School Macclesfield, Cheshire.

He attended Teesside Polytechnic, now Teesside University, beginning in 1992.

== Career ==
=== Vodafone ===
He joined Vodafone in 2000. From 2002 to 2005 he was chief executive of Vizavvi (Vodafone live!). In 2005, he became chief executive of Vodafone Netherlands. He became chief executive of Vodafone UK in 2008.

=== Rogers Communications ===
Laurence was president and CEO of Rogers Communications from December 2013 to October 2016, succeeding Nadir Mohamed who had retired after his 5-year contract expired. Rogers is the largest mobile and cable operator in Canada and second largest media owner. They also own the Toronto Blue Jays and Sportsnet, the largest sports TV network who paid $5.2 billion for the NHL sport rights in 2013.

During his tenure, Rogers beat out Telus to acquire Mobilicity.

However, Laurence was ousted in October 2016, due to a feud with the Rogers family who have four board seats and control Rogers Communications though voting shares.

=== Maple Leaf Sports & Entertainment ===
Laurence was a director of the MLSE, the largest sports company in Canada and one of the largest in North America from 2013 to 2016. MLSE owns The Toronto Maple Leafs, The Toronto Raptors, Toronto Football Club, and the Toronto Marlies.

=== Chelsea ===
In January 2018, Laurence was appointed chief executive of Premier League club Chelsea.

== Personal life ==
He is married with three daughters and lives in Buckinghamshire.

Business positions
Preceded by Nick Read	Chief Executive of Vodafone UK; January 2009-	Succeeded by Jeroen Hoencamp
Preceded by	Chief Executive of Vodafone Netherlands; 2006 – September 2008	Succeeded by Jens Schulte-Bockum
