= Samsung T919 Behold =

Mobile phone

Samsung Behold SGH-T919

- Manufacturer: Samsung
- Availability by region: 2008–2011
- Successor: Samsung Behold II
- Related: Samsung Gravity
- Compatible networks: GSM 850 / 900 /1800 / 1900 / UMTS 1700 / 2100
- Form factor: Candybar / PDA
- Dimensions: 105×53×13 mm (4.13×2.09×0.51 in)
- Weight: 113 g (4 oz)
- Memory: 180 MB internal
- Removable storage: microSD/TransFlash
- Battery: 1000 mAh Li-ion
- Rear camera: 5.0 megapixel
- Display: 240 × 400 pixels (3.0-inch) touchscreen
- Connectivity: Full HTML browser, Bluetooth 2.0, USB
- Data inputs: Virtual QWERTY touchpad

The Samsung Behold (model no. SGH-T919) is a touchscreen, 3G candybar-style cell phone designed by Samsung Electronics. It was released on November 10, 2008 as a T-Mobile US specific version of the European/Asian/Australian Samsung Tocco, with a carrier price starting at $149.99. It has some additional features over the original Tocco such as GPS. Like the Tocco, the Behold runs on Samsung's proprietary operating system with the TouchWiz interface.

The Samsung Behold was sold pre-loaded with the music video "Somewhere Else" by YouTube celebrity, Jodie Rivera a.k.a. VenetianPrincess.

The Behold was one of the earliest Samsung consumer-grade cell phones released in the United States to have a touchscreen, along with the Samsung Omnia, the Samsung Instinct, the Samsung Eternity. Some of the Behold's biggest competitors were Apple's iPhone, T-Mobile G1 and LG Dare.

== User interface ==
The interface on the Samsung Behold is called TouchWiz which is upgraded from the one that was on the Samsung Omnia. With TouchWiz, the Behold got features like "flashy 3D effects, new gesture controls, better integration of photos and contacts, and more haptic feedback."

== Sales ==
Samsung claimed "to have represented exactly one quarter of all touchscreen phones shipped in 2008", estimating "that it produced about 10 million models of various kinds". Five million of these were the F480, alternately known as the Tocco in some countries and the Behold for T-Mobile.

While Samsung is responsible for 25% of all touch-screen shipped in the year 2008, the Apple iPhone represents 33.3%, approximately one third of all touch-screen shipped in the year 2008. Other touch-screen competitors include LG, HTC, and Palm that make up for the rest of the touch-screen shipments.

== Reception and criticism ==
Overall, Ginny Mies of PC World concluded that the Samsung Behold "is a well-designed touch-screen phone with an impressive feature set" however many reviewers state that there are a few "flaws" that they notice when using this mobile phone. Contributor Wireless and Mobile News states that the biggest drawback of the Samsung Behold compared to one of its major competitors, the Apple iPhone, is the lack of Wi-Fi on this touch-screen phone. The Samsung Behold's "target [audiences] [are] 21 to 35 year [olds]" who are looking for a mobile phone that could do nearly everything.

The browser that comes with the Behold is not as sophisticated as the Apple iPhone's safari and with larger websites, it only allows the user to see only a portion of the website. In the email function on the Behold, the user can only choose from the 13 different email providers given and cannot add their own onto it. Some users may find that the QWERTY keyboard is bit small but after a while, users may be able to get used to it.

With the TouchWiz interface that the Samsung Behold has, it allows for little personalization options for the home screen such as the limited wallpapers options and no screen savers but it does allow for using a photo that is taken with the camera on the Samsung Behold as the wallpaper. Also, the Behold's phonebook only allows the user to search for contacts' names through first names which could be a hassle.

As for the Samsung Behold's camera, while photos taken outdoors seem to be clear and vibrant, reviewers feel photos taken indoors turn out to be "fuzzy with colors being on the dull side when taking shots from far distances." There is a flash on the Behold's camera but it is only useful when taking photos at a closer range (around three feet). As for the video application, users were dissatisfied with the quality of the footage taken because the highest quality of the videos could only be 320 X 240. Users felt that there were very few options for the video application and that the sound the videos produced were very low and users had to listen very closely to hear the sound. Mostly, this 5.0 pixel camera phone works just as well as a normal camera.

Minor dislikes of the Samsung Behold that will vary with differing tastes are the simple design of the music player, for users who wish to use the Samsung Behold as a business handy phone, it does not allow for Microsoft Office documents to be opened but it allows PDF files to load, lacking a standard headphone jack.
