= VenetianPrincess =

American YouTube personality

- Born: Jodie-Amy; Massachusetts
- Occupations: YouTuber; singer; actress
- Website: vprincess.com on Wayback Machine

Jodie-Amy (Previously Rivera) known professionally as VenetianPrincess, is an American former YouTuber. Her content typically included parodies of songs and events in pop culture. Despite being inactive, her channel maintains 860,000 subscriptions with total video views of 365 million. The VenetianPrincess channel gained notoriety in 2006 after being featured on the front page of YouTube. In 2007 she became one of the first people invited into YouTube's revenue sharing program.

In December 2008, Samsung announced that VenetianPrincess's music video for her original song "Somewhere Else" is the pre-installed video on all Samsung Behold cell phones. PC World Magazine named her "7 Things Guys Don't Have To Do" music video one of the top 10 viral videos of 2008. She was the most subscribed female YouTuber in the world for several years.

== Personal life ==
Rivera is of Swedish and Italian ancestry, and grew up in Brockton, Massachusetts. She studied opera as a soprano.

During a May 2012 interview on CBS' The Insider, Rivera reaffirmed that she chose the name VenetianPrincess because of her love of Lady Diana and a fascination with the Italian city of Venice.

== Videos ==
She became popular for her episodic series The Princess Chronicles (formerly known as "The Disclosed Series"). The series was known for its elaborate editing and visual effects.

== Press ==
In 2007, she received media coverage for her videos, with appearances on Fox News, Boston, Fox News Milwaukee, and ABC News Boston. She was interviewed on Massachusetts radio station JAMN 94.5, and a two-page article was also written about her in the Boston Herald on June 18, 2007. A segment about her videos was presented by Bill Weir on ABC's first episode of television series I-Caught, airing on August 7, 2007.

On February 10, 2008, an article about VenetianPrincess was featured in the Boston Globe. On February 11, 2008, another large article was printed in the Brockton Enterprise.

In April 2008, VenetianPrincess' "Hillary, Be My Best Friend" parody video went viral with over 800,000 views in just over 2 days. The video received press coverage from CNN, Fox News, NBC News, The Washington Post, VH1.com, and Hotair.com.

In July 2008, VenetianPrincess and MakeMeBad35's video collaboration of "Drunken Genie" (as titled on VenetianPrincess' channel) and "My Pretty Genie" (as titled on MakeMeBad35's channel) got an Epic Fail on Attack of the Show on G4. The hosts on the show have also chosen VenetianPrincess one of the top hottest women of the web for three consecutive weeks.

In February 2009, VenetianPrincess made a video about Nadya Suleman titled "Octo-Mom Song". The video was mentioned in several national magazines and newspapers including the LA Times, USA Today, Radar Online, Trendhunter Magazine, Entrevue Magazine, and Don't Miss Magazine. She has also made parodies about the Jonas Brothers.

On August 10, 2009, VenetianPrincess' Transformers 2 Parody was shown on MTV on the It's On with Alexa Chung show. Alexa Chung commented "Megan Fox's acting was amazing in that video", referring to VP's portrayal of Megan Fox.

On May 15, 2012, Rivera was featured on the CBS series The Insider.

== Acting career ==
Rivera appeared in Disney's 1993 Halloween-themed fantasy horror comedy film Hocus Pocus very briefly as a child during a musical sequence as an extra. Rivera has constantly been mistaken with the actress that played the role of Emily Binx. Most recently, she has appeared in two episodes of HBO's web show Elevator: Drunk Dial and Telemarketer. She has also produced videos for MTV, Universal Pictures, ABC, and other major brands.

== Awards/Rank Achievements ==
- Samsung announced her as the winner of their national "Juke Box Hero" Contest. Her music video for her original song "Somewhere Else" is now the pre-installed video on all T-Mobile cell phones.
- In March 2008, G4TV named her one of the hottest women of the web on two separate television segments.
- PC World Magazine named her "7 Things Guys Don't Have To Do" music video one of the top 10 viral videos of 2008.
- In April 2009, she won the title of Miss YouTube.
- In December 2009, YouTube named her "Outerspace" music video, one of the Most Memorable Videos of 2009.
- In December 2010, YouTube named her "Snooki Song" music video, one of the Most Memorable Videos of 2010.
- In 2010, Forbes named her one of the Top Careers Launched Via Youtube. Forbes Source
- From 2009 to 2012 she was the No. 1 most subscribed female YouTuber globally.

== Publications ==
=== Books ===
Rivera has been profiled:

- Jarboe, Greg (2009). YouTube and Video Marketing An Hour A Day. ISBN 978-0470459690.
- Nalty, Kevin H. (2010). Beyond Viral: How to Attract Customers, Promote Your Brand, and Make Money with Online Video. Wiley. ISBN 978-0470598887.

=== Magazines ===
VP has been featured in several spreads in major magazines.

- Der Spiegel (2012), one of Europe's largest circulated weeklies "VP Featured in Major Mazine Article". November 29, 2011.
- El País Magazine (December 11, 2009), Spain's largest magazine
- DNA Magazine (September 13, 2009), India's top English-printed magazine
- VP has also been profiled in several celebrity magazines overseas including France's Premier Magazine and Israel's "Teen Magazine"

== Discography ==
=== Albums ===
- 2009: Video Girl
- 2011: Video Girl – Rebooted

=== Music Videos/Parody Singles ===
- Brangelina, Adopt Me Too (2007) – 3:31
- Hillary, Be My Best Friend (2008) – 3:22
- Bad Mom Song (2008) – 1:43
- I Got A Crush On... Giuliani (2008) – 1:39
- 7 Things Guys Don't Have To Do (Parody of 7 Things by Miley Cyrus) (2008) – 2:39
- I Kissed a Girl (Elderly Mix) (Parody of I Kissed a Girl by Katy Perry) (2008) – 3:18
- Tinseltown Nanny (2008) – 2:50
- Jonas Brothers Addict Anthem (2008) – 2:12
- Womanizer (Geek Version) (Parody of Womanizer by Britney Spears) (2008) – 2:47
- Octo-Mom Song (Parody of Low by Flo Rida) (2009) – 1:30
- Outer Space (Parody of Poker Face by Lady Gaga) (2009) – 4:38
- Just a Zombie (Parody of You Belong With Me by Taylor Swift) (2009) – 1:55
- You'll Look Like Poo (Parody of When I Look at You by Miley Cyrus) (2009) – 3:41
- Speidi Free (Parody of 3 by Britney Spears) (2009) – 2:32
- The Snooki Song (Parody of Tik Tok by Ke$ha) (2010) – 1:27
- Accident Prone (Parody of Telephone by Lady Gaga featuring Beyoncé) (2010) – 2:09
- I'm a Gleek (Parody of Firework by Katy Perry) (2010) – 2:23
- Silent Night (Cover) (2010) – 2:10
- Crush on a Yeti (Parody of Hold It Against Me by Britney Spears) (2011) – 2:30
- Charlie Sheen (Quotes) (Parody of ET by Katy Perry) (2011) – 1:46
- The Edge of Glory (Lady Gaga cover) (2011) – 3:25
- I Gotta Go (Parody Of I Wanna Go By Britney Spears) (2011) – 1:56
- Reality Star Summer (original song) (2011) – 1:28
- It's Halloween (original song) (2011) – 1:39
- Someone Like You (Adele cover) (2011) – 4:40
- Kardashian Boycott (Parody of We Found Love by Rihanna featuring Calvin Harris) (2011) – 2:01
- Chocolate Is a Girl's Best Friend (original song) (2012) – 1:59
- The End Is Nigh (Parody of You and I by Lady Gaga) (2012) – 3:45
- Puppy Love (Parody of What Makes You Beautiful by One Direction) (2012) – 1:42
- My Body (Parody of Your Body by Christina Aguilera) (2012) – 1:40
- The Vampire Song (Parody of Peacock by Katy Perry) (2012) – 2:16
- #Beautiful (Parody of Beautiful by Mariah Carey ft. Miguel) (2013) – 1:56
- Thor (Parody of Roar by Katy Perry) (2013) – 2:50
- Hurt, Bitch (Parody of Work Bitch by Britney Spears) (2013) – 2:05
