= Samsung Behold II =

Android smartphone developed by Samsung

Samsung Behold 2 SGH-T939
- Manufacturer: Samsung
- Availability by region: US November 18, 2009
- Predecessor: Samsung Behold
- Compatible networks: GSM850, GSM900, GSM1800, GSM1900, UMTS900, UMTS1700, UMTS2100
- Form factor: Candybar / PDA
- Weight: 119 g (4.2 oz)
- Operating system: Android 1.5 Cupcake
- Storage: 200 MB built-in; up to 16 GB via microSD expansion
- Removable storage: microSDHC
- Battery: 1500 mAh
- Rear camera: 5.0-megapixel
- Display: 3.2 inches Touchscreen
- Connectivity: Full HTML Browser, Bluetooth 2.1, USB
- Data inputs: Virtual QWERTY touchpad

The Samsung Behold II is a touch-screen, 3G-compatible smartphone with a 5.0-megapixel camera. The Samsung Behold II is powered by the Android OS, making it the fourth Android powered phone by T-Mobile USA. Other Android powered phones by T-Mobile are the G1 (HTC Dream), myTouch 3G (HTC Magic), and the Motorola CLIQ. It was released on November 18, 2009. On May 27, 2010, Samsung announced that Android 1.6 "Donut" would be the final firmware release for the device.

== Design ==
The Samsung Behold II is the updated version of the Samsung Behold. The Samsung Behold and the Samsung Behold II are both candybar style mobile phones with a touch screen. The Samsung Behold II has a 3.2 inch Active-matrix OLED touchscreen with HVGA resolution that works with the TouchWiz interface. With this touch screen and interface one can customize three different home screens with widgets and shortcuts, and a “cube menu”, which provides access to six multimedia features: music, photos, videos, Internet, YouTube and Amazon MP3.

== Interface ==
The Behold II uses Samsung's TouchWiz user interface. This interface has been used with multiple Samsung touch screen phones on different companies such as the Samsung eternity. This interface allows the users to personalize their phone in the way they choose by changing how their home screens look by adding widgets. The Samsung Behold II has three home screens, the main screen and then a screen if the user were to slide their finger across their screen to the right and also to the left. As stated on Samsung's website: The 'drag and drop' user interface allows the users to have shortcuts on their home screens which in turn gives them quick access to some of their most used applications. The Behold II has a menu of widgets that once placed on the home screen, they can display useful functions such as a clock, the radio player, music player, and even personal elements ranging from photos to birthday reminders. Samsung has tactile technology which can give users a tangible vibration feedback sensation when the screen is touched. However, when Samsung created the TouchWiz UI on top of Android, they did not limit the UI for allowing users from stacking app icons on top of each other.

== Camera ==
The Samsung Behold II comes equipped with a 5.0-megapixel camera. This camera has a few specific features ranging in having an autofocus feature, a flash, and the ability to do video recording.

== Additional information ==
The Samsung Behold II is able to hold up to 16 GB of extra memory via the microSD slot. It has Bluetooth 2.1, Wi-Fi and Wi-Fi radio, GPS, and support for Google services and Exchange ActiveSync. Through Google services, the Behold II has Google Search, Google Maps, Gmail, Google Calendar, and Google Talk. The Behold II has a Chrome Lite Browser. It has an internal antenna, alarm, calendar, calculator, stopwatch, and an application for a to-do list, which can be made into widgets. The phonebook allows the user to have multiple numbers per contact. The user can also have picture ID and Ring ID for each contact if they choose. This phone has many more features such as having a speakerphone and a voice recording application.

=== Bluetooth profiles ===
The Behold II supports the following Bluetooth profiles:

- Headset Profile (HSP)
- Hands-Free Profile (HFP)
- Advanced Audio Distribution Profile (A2DP)
- Object Push Profile (OPP)
- Basic Printing Profile (BPP)

== Update controversy ==
Despite claims made in advertisements and infomercials that the Behold II would continue to receive Android OS firmware updates, on May 27, 2010, only six months after the initial release of the device, Samsung abruptly announced that Android 1.6 "Donut" would be the last such update. This business decision by Samsung angered many users, prompting speculation that there might be a class action lawsuit.

While the Android platform itself is open source, proprietary aspects relating to this Samsung device are closed source and generally unavailable, making a third-party continuation of firmware updates impossible.

== See also ==
- List of Android devices
- Galaxy Nexus
