= Samsung T559 Comeback =

Mobile phone

Samsung SGH-T559 (Comeback)
- Manufacturer: Samsung Electronics
- Availability by region: Q3 2009
- Compatible networks: GSM, HSDPA
- Form factor: Clamshell
- Dimensions: 4.3×2.2×0.7 in (109×56×18 mm)
- Weight: 4.6 oz (130 g)
- Storage: Internal: 75 MB; External: Up to 16 GB
- Removable storage: microSD
- Battery: Li-Ion (960 mAh)
- Rear camera: 2.0 megapixel
- Connectivity: 3G capability Quad-band GSM 850 900 1800 1900 MHz
- Data inputs: QWERTY keyboard Alphanumeric keypad

The Samsung Comeback (SGH-T559) is a mobile phone announced by T-Mobile on 22 July 2009 and released in Q3 2009. The phone has a full QWERTY keyboard, and is primarily a messaging phone, though it does have internet capability.

== Overview ==
The Comeback has a 2.0-megapixel camera, an HTML browser with Flash Lite, 3G support, stereo Bluetooth, and a music player that supports MP3, AAC/AAC+, WMA, MPEG4, WAV, MIDI, and RealAudio formats. It has an SAR of 1.35 watts per kilogram.

The phone comes in White/Cherry Red or Grey/Plum colors. The Alphanumeric keypad glows orange on both color choices.
