= RedFlagDeals.com =

- Screenshot of RedFlagDeals' homepage
- Website type: Bargain/Coupon website
- Available in: English
- Founded: October 25, 2000; 26 years ago Toronto, Ontario, Canada
- Headquarters: Toronto, Ontario, Canada
- Founder: Derek Szeto
- Key people: Derek Szeto (President)
- Employees: 50
- Website: www.redflagdeals.com
- Users: 5.7 million visitors per month 1.2 million registered users
- Launched: November 2000
- Current status: Active

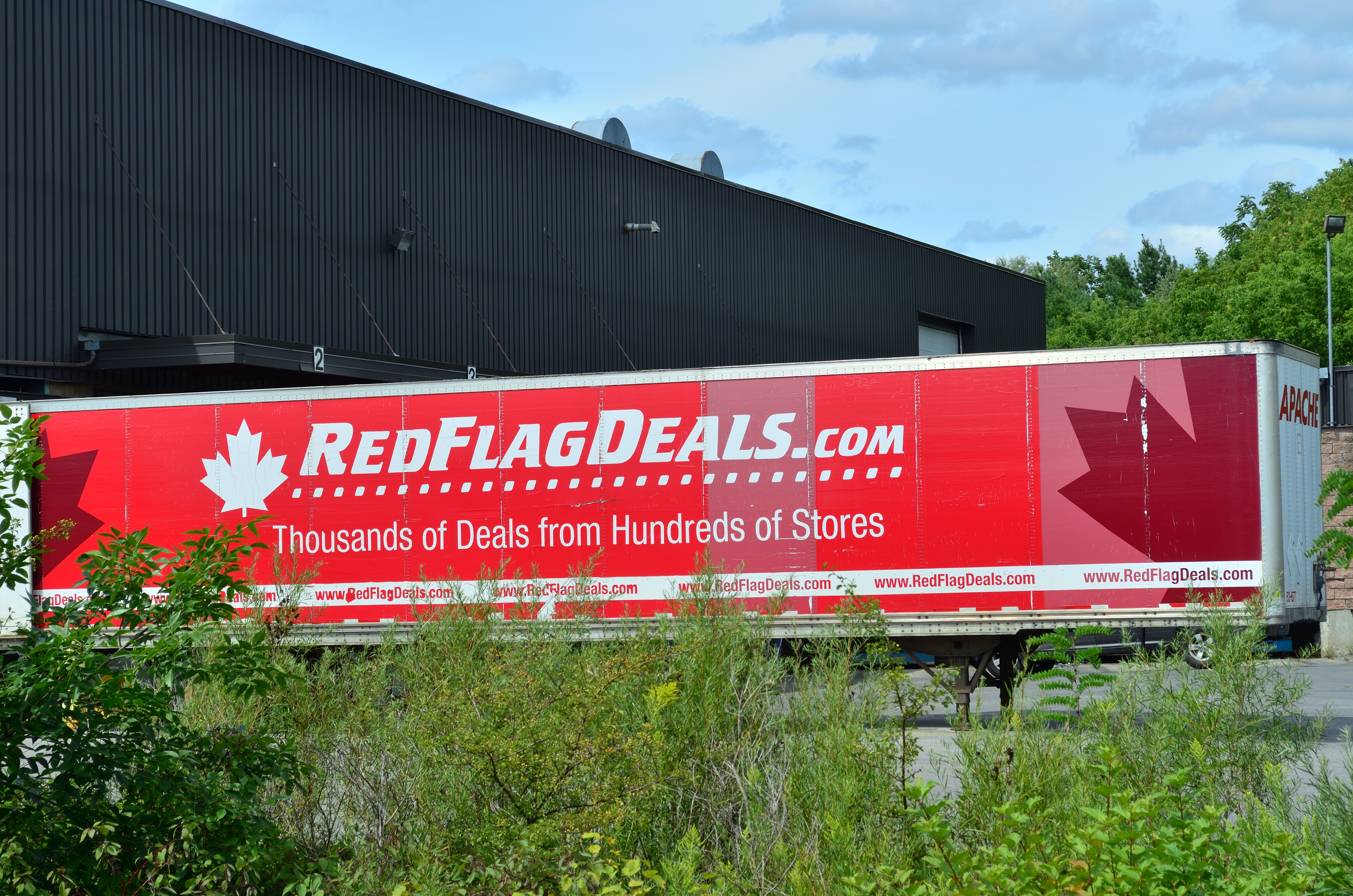
RedFlagDeals.com shipping container at a warehouse

RedFlagDeals.com is a Canadian coupon website owned by VerticalScope (majority owned by Torstar). As of December 2024, an estimated 5.7 million or more visitors per month use the website and there are over 1.45 million registered users.

== History ==
In November 2000, RedFlagDeals.com was started with the founding of Clear Sky Media by Derek Szeto. Since then, RedFlagDeals.com has become one of the largest Canadian bargain-hunting websites.

In February 2010, Yellow Pages Group acquired the company for $9,750,000 worth of preferred shares.

In August 2018, the company was purchased by VerticalScope, a Toronto-based operator of online communities, who is owned by Torstar.

== Forums ==
The RedFlagDeals.com forums is ranked #173 on the list of biggest message boards on the Internet. Some notable sub-forums include the Hot Deals, Freebies, and Contests forums.

Forums statistics as of December 18, 2024:

- Members: 1,455,517
- Threads: 2,007,561
- Posts: 33,789,584

== See also ==
- List of Internet forums
- Internet forum
