= Samsung SGH-T729 Blast =

Mobile phone model

Samsung SGH-T729 (Blast)
- Manufacturer: Samsung
- Availability by region: 2007
- Compatible networks: GSM 850/900, 1800, 1900
- Form factor: slider
- Dimensions: 4.13" x 2.05" x 0.51" (105mm x 52mm x 13mm)
- Weight: 2.82 oz (80 g)
- Memory: 11 MB
- Removable storage: microSD
- Battery: Lithium Ion 800 mAh
- Rear camera: 1.3 megapixel
- Display: 176 X 220 px, 262,000 colors
- Connectivity: GPRS / EDGE Class 10, Bluetooth 2.0

Released during Q3 2007 for T-Mobile in the US, the Samsung Blast (SGH-T729) slider features a double-tap QWERTY keypad, music player, stereo bluetooth and a MicroSD slot.

== Features ==
- Thin and light slider-style design
- 1.3-megapixel camera 4x zoom with multishot and camcorder capabilities
- Bluetooth wireless capability for headsets, synchronizing with PCs or phones
- Quad-band GSM ("Worldphone") capability
- Built-in MP3 player with stereo Bluetooth 2.0 wireless technology to listen to music without wires
- Check email via POP3, IMAP4, and SMTP protocols
- Half QWERTY keypad (aka double-tap)
- MicroSD slot. Supports up to 2 GB (officially) though some users have reported being able to use 4 GB cards.

== Capabilities and applications ==
The phone had a two-inch display that supported 262,000 colors. The phone offered direct access to personal email, including AOL email, Yahoo! Mail and Gmail, as well as access to instant messaging with built-in support for AOL Instant Messenger (AIM), ICQ, Windows Live Messenger and Yahoo! Messenger. 1,000 contacts could be stored in the phone. stereo Bluetooth technology, a 1.3-megapixel camera with digital zoom, multi-shot, and video recording capabilities, external memory card slot, MP3 player and speaker independent voice recognition. Users also can stay connected while traveling worldwide with the Blast's quad-band technology.

== Defects ==
- There have been reports of 2 GB MicroSD cards (specifically Kingston) not being recognized by the Samsung Blast while working in other devices. However, Sandisk and other brands seem to work fine.
- While not technically a defect, the Samsung Blast has a low call volume which is easily solved by using the hands-free accessory that comes with the phone.
- Also, the microphone is ultra-sensitive to any contact made to the phone. Even slightly moving the phone can cause the user to cut out to the receiving person.

== Specifications ==
- Form factor: Slider
- Internal antenna

=== Audio ===
Ringtones and media player limitations
Format	Media player support	Ringtone support	Max media player file size	Max supported bitrates	Character limits	Max ringtone file size
MP3	Yes	Yes	Unknown	Unknown	47	Unknown
AAC	Yes	No	Unknown	Unknown	47	N/A
M4A	Yes	No	Unknown	Unknown	47	N/A
MP4	Yes	No	Unknown	Unknown	47	N/A
3GP	Yes	No	128–256	Unknown	47	N/A

=== Battery ===
- Specifications
  - Type: Internal cell Li-Ion
  - Milliamp hours: 800 mAh
  - Battery voltage: 3.7 volts
  - Battery housing/cover color: Red
  - Liquid Damage Indicator (LDI): Top side ledge
- Charging time
  - Travel charger: 3.0 hours
  - Car charger: 3.0 hours
- Talk time
  - Digital 1900 MHz: Up to 5 hours
  - Digital 850 MHz: Up to 5 hours
- Standby time
  - Digital 1900 MHz: Up to 200 hours (8.3 days)
  - Digital 850 MHz: Up to 200 hours (8.3 days)

=== Bluetooth ===
- Version: 2.0 + EDR (Enhanced Data Rate)
- Bluetooth 2400 MHz: 2402.0 – 2480.0 MHz
- Supported profiles:
  - A2DP: Advanced Audio Distribution Profile
  - BPP: Basic Printing Profile
  - DUN: Dial-up networking Profile
  - FTP: File Transfer Profile
  - HFP: Hands-Free Profile
  - HSP: Headset Profile
  - OPP: Object Push Profile
  - SPP: Serial Port Profile

=== Camera ===
- Type: CMOS
- Physical location on handset: Top back of slider
- Image format: JPG
- Max storage capacity for pictures in phone memory: Up to 11 MB (shared memory)

Camera specifications

- Megapixel rating: 1.3 MP
- Resolution settings:

Resolution	Average file size
1280×1024	139 kb
1024×768	103 kb
800×600	60 kb
640×480	39 kb
320×240	15 kb
176×744	6 kb
176×220	8 kb

Image usability

- Wallpaper
- Caller ID Image
- Group ID Image
- Picture Mail

Camera controls and settings

- Self Timer: 3 sec, 5 sec, 10 sec
- Multi-Shot: 69, 15
  - Multi-Shot Quality: Normal, High
- Shot Mosaic:
  - 2x2
  - 3x3
- Zoom:
  - Digital: 4×
  - Manual: 0 to 6
- White Balance:
  - Auto
  - Sunny/Daylight
  - Cloudy
  - Fluorescent
  - Incandescent
- Color Tones:
  - Auto
  - Black and White
  - Sepia
  - Aqua
  - Emboss
  - Sketch
  - Negative
- Fun Frames: 30

=== Messaging ===
- Predictive Text Input: XT9 Easy Text Input
- E-mail capabilities: AOL, Yahoo, Custom 1, Custom 2
- Instant Messaging: AOL, ICQ, Yahoo, Windows Live

SMS/EMS

- EMS Added: Yes
- Total SMS/EMS Storage Capacity: 200, Push: 30
- Character Limit Per Message: 160
- SMS/EMS Concatenation (Link) support: Yes

MMS

- Total MMS storage capacity: Up to 11 MB
- Character limit per message: 1000

• Note: IM and e-mail both use text messages and may incur charges

== Carriers ==
The phone has been distributed in the United States by T-Mobile.

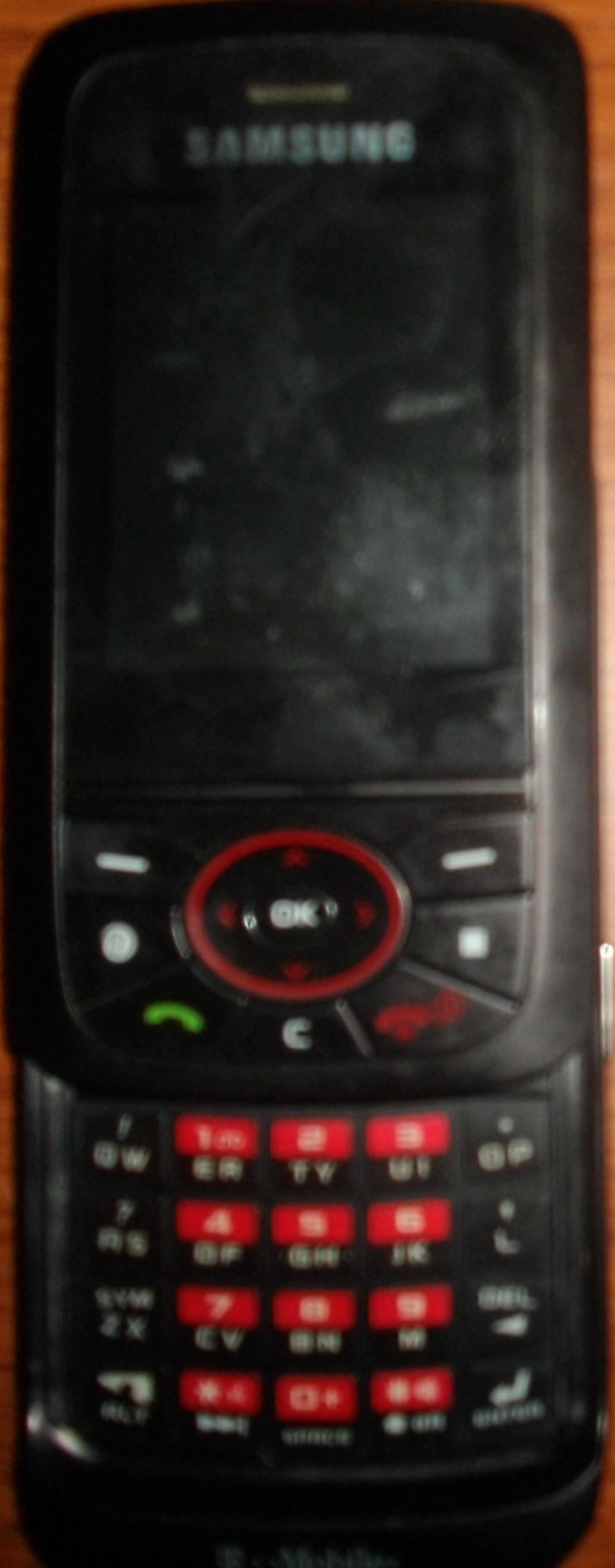
Blast with full double-tap keypad visible

Back of the Samsung Blast, battery cover
