= HTC Windows Phone 8S =

Smartphone model

Windows Phone 8S by HTC
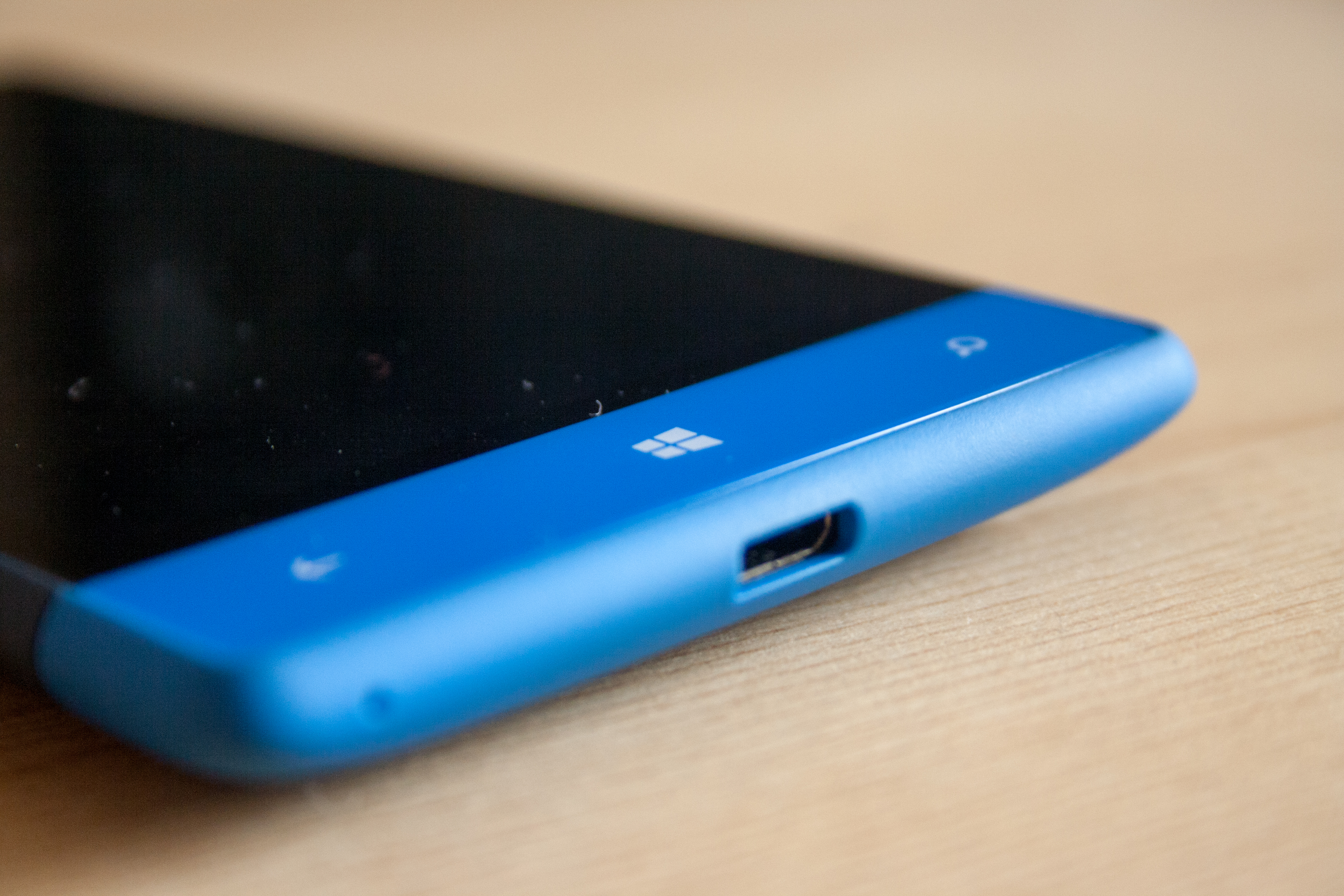
- Manufacturer: HTC Corporation
- Type: Smartphone
- First released: December 7, 2012 (Canada)
- Related: Windows Phone 8X by HTC
- Compatible networks: GSM/GPRS/EDGE 850/900/1800/1900; HSPA 900/2100
- Form factor: Slate
- Dimensions: 120.5×63×10.28 mm (4.744×2.480×0.405 in)
- Weight: 113 g (4 oz)
- Operating system: Windows Phone 8
- System-on-chip: Qualcomm Snapdragon S4 MSM8627
- CPU: 1.0 GHz dual-core Qualcomm Krait
- GPU: Qualcomm Adreno 305
- Memory: 4 GB internal flash (1.1 GB available); 512 MB RAM
- Removable storage: MicroSD (up to 32GB)
- Battery: 1700 mAh Li-ion battery
- Rear camera: 5 Megapixels, 720p video recording
- Front camera: None
- Display: 4" S-LCD; 800 x 480 px (WVGA)
- Connectivity: Bluetooth 3.1+EDR
- Data inputs: Multi-touch capacitive touchscreen, proximity sensor, ambient light sensor
- Website: http://www.htc.com/www/smartphones/htc-wp-8s/

The Windows Phone 8S by HTC was announced by HTC Corporation on September 19, 2012 and released on December 7, 2012 in Canada. It is a cheaper, lower-end version of the Windows Phone 8X by HTC. Despite its availability in Canada, HTC announced that the 8S will not be sold in the United States because the company plans to focus instead on the 8X, which is considered its signature phone on the Windows operating system.

Because of the limited memory available on this phone, certain applications and features will not be able to run.

== Availability ==
In Canada, the HTC 8S was first available released for Virgin Mobile Canada on December 7, 2012. HTC plans to make the 8S available at Koodo Mobile, Mobilicity and Wind Mobile in 2013.

== Reception ==
One week after launching the device, Virgin Mobile Canada reported that the phone has been "flying off the shelves". At that time, the Mobile Syrup blog stated that the 8S was "the best deal on a no-contract phone at the moment" The blog also praised the device's size and design, and claimed that the phone "makes a number of compromises […] but it’s still able to perform […] well".

Ewan Spence from All About Windows Phone wrote: "While there are clear use cases for the 8S (and I can think of a few people in my family that would get by easily with the 8S) it feels like a missed opportunity. It's going to fall seriously short with anyone who is looking to really push the Windows Phone 8 platform."

== OS updates ==
The HTC Windows Phone 8S has received the Windows Phone 8.1 update, but has not been updated officially further to Windows Phone 8.1 Update 1 (however, the latest 8.1 updates can be obtained via Microsoft's "Preview for Developers" app), despite its relatively better counterpart, the Windows Phone 8X, having received this latest update. As such, it has become highly unlikely that there will an update to Windows 10 Mobile for the 8S.

== See also ==
- HTC
- HTC Windows Phone 8X
- Windows Phone 8
