= Eastlink Wireless =

Canadian mobile network operator

- Type: Subsidiary
- Industry: Mobile network operator
- Founded: 2012
- Headquarters: Halifax, Nova Scotia
- Parent: Eastlink
- Website: www.eastlink.ca/mobile

Eastlink Wireless is a Canadian mobile network operator owned by Eastlink. Its built network serves the provinces of Nova Scotia and Prince Edward Island, with additional coverage areas provided in New Brunswick, Ontario and Alberta communities as well as Newfoundland.

== History ==
Eastlink spent $25,628,000 for Advanced Wireless Services (AWS) spectrum licenses covering Atlantic Canada, plus smaller communities elsewhere in Canada.

== Network ==
Eastlink has AWS spectrum licenses to serve the entire Atlantic Canada population, plus Grande Prairie, Alberta and several small cities throughout Ontario. Combined, these markets cover a population of 4,886,983. The carrier is using LTE and HSPA+ technology. In March 2022, Eastlink launched a 5G network in partnership with Ericsson. As of January 2023, 5G is available in multiple cities in Atlantic Canada, with the goal of expanding through the entire network.

== Products ==
=== Smartphones ===
Eastlink sells multiple Android and iOS devices, from Apple, Samsung, LG, Motorola. Many of these devices support 5G, and all support the carriers LTE network. Eastlink no longer offers mobile broadband hotspots or feature phones directly.

== Services ==
Various services are available at Eastlink Wireless.

=== Plans ===
Eastlink offers many plan options such as, Unlimited Data, Rollover Data, Starter Data, and Talk and Text. All Unlimited and Rollover data plans include unlimited minutes and messaging, with the Unlimited Data plans also offering unlimited reduced speed data after the data cap is met. The Starter Data plans offer lower cost plans with smaller amounts of data, and the lowest 250mb plan also has a 100 Outgoing minute limit. The Talk & Text plan offers unlimited minutes and messaging but no mobile data service. Currently, no mobile data only plans are offered.

=== Device subsidies ===
Eastlink offers a device subsidy option called the easyTab for customers with a plan costing $40 or more.

=== Roaming ===
When in parts of Canada not on Eastlink's network, customers roam domestically at no extra charge on the networks of one of the three major mobile providers in Canada (Bell Mobility, Rogers Wireless, and Telus Mobility) as well as on Vidéotron Mobile in Quebec.
