= T-Mobile Tap =

Mobile phone model

The T-Mobile Tap is a mobile phone manufactured by Huawei, Inc. and marketed under the T-Mobile brand and service. It is also known as the Huawei U7519. It was released in November 2009, and was available in many European and Asian markets.

== Features ==
The Tap features a 2.8-inch resistive touchscreen. It also features a 2.0 megapixel camera, Bluetooth connectivity, built-in GPS, a music player, and access to T-Mobile's MyFaves. While it lacks a 3.5 mm headset jack, the device instead comes with an in-ear headset that connects through the Tap's USB port. The phone is also bundled with a USB cable to manage files on a personal computer, Huawei's PC Suite software to manage the files, and a T-Mobile full size SIM card. A spring-loading microSD slot is located under the phone's battery cover.

Physical buttons are the power button, a lock button and camera launcher on the side of the phone, a call start button, a navigation pad and 'wheel', and a call end button. The physical specifications of this phone are comparable with that of the HTC Touch.

The phone currently comes in the colors midnight blue and berry (metallic pink).

== Notes ==
It cannot be used without a SIM card.
