= Advanced Wireless Services =

Telecommunications spectrum band

Advanced Wireless Services (AWS) is a wireless telecommunications spectrum band used for mobile voice and data services, video, and messaging. AWS is used in the United States, Argentina, Canada, Colombia, Mexico, Chile, Paraguay, Peru, Ecuador, Trinidad and Tobago, Uruguay and Venezuela. It replaces some of the spectrum formerly allocated to Multipoint Multichannel Distribution Service (MMDS), sometimes referred to as Wireless Cable, that existed from 2150 to 2162 MHz.

The AWS band uses microwave frequencies in several segments: from 1695 to 2200 MHz. The service is intended to be used by mobile devices such as wireless phones for mobile voice, data, and messaging services. Most manufacturers of smartphone mobile handsets provide versions of their phones that include radios that can communicate using the AWS spectrum. Though initially limited, device support for AWS has steadily improved the longer the band has been in general use, with most high-end and many mid-range handsets supporting it over UMTS, LTE and 5G NR.

== Changes ==
The frequency band covered by the Advanced Wireless Services bands

The AWS band defined in 2002 (AWS-1), used microwave frequencies in two segments, from 1710 to 1755 MHz for uplink, and from 2110 to 2155 MHz for downlink. The service is intended to be used by mobile devices such as wireless phones for mobile voice, data, and messaging services. Most manufacturers of smartphone mobile handsets provide versions of their phones that include radios that can communicate using the AWS spectrum. Since for downlink AWS uses a subset of UMTS frequency band I (2100 MHz) some UMTS2100 capable handsets do detect AWS networks but cannot register on them due to the difference in uplink frequencies (1710–1755 MHz for AWS versus 1920–1980 MHz for UMTS2100).

Though initially limited, device support for AWS has steadily improved the longer the frequency has been in general use, with most high-end and many mid-range handsets supporting it over HSPA, LTE, or both. In Canada, almost all available LTE handsets support AWS as it was the first frequency over which LTE was offered there, and was still the most commonly supported frequency for LTE in Canada as of 2014-08-21.

In 2012 the [FCC] released rules for the 'H' block (AWS-2), covering the frequencies 1915-1920 MHz and 1995-2000 MHz.

In 2013 they regulated the AWS-3 Block, covering bands 1695-1710 MHz, 1755-1780 MHz and 2155-2180 MHz.

In 2012 there was a proposal regarding the AWS-4 Block, which regulated use of 2000-2020 MHz and 2180-2200 MHz. These were initially proposed for use with the Mobile Satellite System (MSS), but later more uses were introduced

== Canada ==
In Canada, Industry Canada held the auction for AWS spectrum in 2008. Freedom Mobile (formerly Wind Mobile) had licensed AWS spectrum in every province, and began offering voice and data services on December 16, 2009. Its Saskatchewan and Manitoba spectrum was later sold off to SaskTel and MTS, respectively. Freedom only operates in British Columbia, Alberta and Ontario, although they have roaming agreements with Rogers, Telus and Bell at extra cost.

Mobilicity also used the AWS spectrum and began offering services in May 2010, operating in similar areas as Wind but with a smaller network footprint. Its AWS network was combined with Rogers when the latter company acquired Mobilicity in 2015.

Quebecor licensed AWS spectrum throughout the province of Quebec and began offering service with its Vidéotron Mobile brand on September 9, 2010.

Shaw Communications licensed AWS spectrum in western Canada and northern Ontario, began to build some infrastructure for providing wireless phone service, but subsequently decided to cancel further development and did not launch this service. The licenses were eventually sold to Rogers, with some transferred to Wind. Shaw re-entered the mobile services market when it acquired Wind Mobile in 2016.

Halifax-based EastLink obtained licenses in eastern Canada, with a small amount of spectrum bought in Ontario and Alberta, and is currently building up infrastructure to launch mobile phone and data services in Nova Scotia and PEI in 2012. This Service has since launched and is available in numerous markets around Atlantic Canada with roaming through Rogers and Bell.

Rogers Wireless, Bell Mobility, Telus Mobility, SaskTel, and Manitoba Telecom Services (MTS) all received licenses for AWS spectrum, which they are now using for their LTE networks. Freedom Mobile has subsequently refarmed some spectrum in their UMTS network and deployed LTE on bands 4, and 66.

== United States ==
In the United States, the service is administered by the Federal Communications Commission. The licenses were broken up into 6 blocks (A-F). Block A consisted of 734 Cellular Market Areas (CMA). Blocks B and C were each divided into 176 Economic Areas (EA), sometimes referred to as BEA by the FCC. Blocks D, E, and F were each broken up into 12 Regional Economic Area Groupings (REAG), sometimes referred to as REA by the FCC. Bidding for this new spectrum started on August 9, 2006 and the majority of the frequency blocks were sold to T-Mobile USA to deploy their 3G wireless network in the United States. This move effectively killed the former MMDS and/or Wireless Cable service in the United States.

== Operators ==
The following mobile network operators are known to use AWS. Indicated in the list are the launch dates and city.

=== Antigua and Barbuda ===
- FLOW – November 2014
- Digicel

=== Argentina ===
- Movistar – December 2014
- Personal – December 2014
- Claro Argentina – June 2015

=== Canada ===
Primary network (UMTS)

- Vidéotron Mobile – September 9, 2010 in Montreal and Québec City, QC

UMTS and LTE

- Freedom Mobile – December 16, 2009 (primary) and December 2016 in Toronto, ON.
- Eastlink Wireless – Feb 2013 (primary) in Halifax, NS.

LTE only

- Rogers Wireless – July 2011
- Bell Mobility – November 2011
- Telus Mobility – February 2012
- MTS Wireless – September 2012
- SaskTel Wireless – January 2013

=== Chile ===
- Nextel Chile – April 2012 to June 2015
- WOM Chile – July 2015
- VTR Chile - July 2015

=== Colombia ===
- Tigo-ETB – December 2013 in Bogotá, Medellín, Barranquilla, Cali, Pereira, Manizales, Armenia
- Movistar – December 2013 in Bogotá, Medellín, Barranquilla, Cali, Pereira, Bucaramanga, Cartagena
- WOM Colombia - August 2014

=== Dominican Republic ===
- Claro República Dominicana – July 2014

=== Ecuador ===
- CNT EP – Fall 2013 starting in Guayaquil and Quito

=== Jamaica ===
- Digicel - 2019.
- FLOW - December 2016.

=== Mexico ===
- Nextel Mexico – September 2012
- Telcel – November 2012
- Movistar – September 2014, (moved to B2/PCS 1900MHz)
- AT&T – September 2015

=== Paraguay ===
- VOX Copaco – February 2012
- CLARO - was assigned with 1700/2100 AWS spectrum in 2015
- Tigo Paraguay

=== Perú ===
- Entel Perú
- Movistar Perú

=== Trinidad and Tobago ===
- Digicel - August 2019
- bmobile - November 2022

=== United States ===
- T-Mobile US – May 1, 2008 in New York City
- Big River Telephone – 2007 in Bollinger, Cape Girardeau, Madison, Perry, St. Francois, Ste. Genevieve, Washington and Wayne Counties Missouri.
- i wireless
- AWN Alaska
- Mosaic Telecom
- Cricket Wireless
- MetroPCS – March 31, 2008 in Las Vegas
- Verizon Wireless – Fall 2013 starting in New York City.
- AT&T Mobility

=== Uruguay ===
- Antel – 2013

=== Venezuela ===
- Movistar, February 2015
- Movilnet, January 2017

== See also ==
- Federal Communications Commission (FCC)
- List of AWS-1 devices
- UMTS frequency bands
- White Spaces Coalition
- Personal Communications Services (PCS)
