= Samsung T669 Gravity T =

Smartphone model

Samsung SGH-T669
- Type: Feature phone
- Dimensions: 109 mm (4.3 in) H 57 mm (2.2 in) W 15 mm (0.59 in) D
- Weight: 120 g (4.2 oz)
- Operating system: proprietary
- Removable storage: microSD/microSDHC (up to 16 GB)
- Battery: 1000 mAh Li-ion, easily replaceable
- Connectivity: Micro USB; Bluetooth
- Data inputs: Touchscreen, slide-out physical keyboard, microphone, A-GPS

The Samsung SGH-T669 is a 3G-capable smartphone manufactured by Samsung. In the US it is also called the Samsung Gravity T; in Canada, the Samsung Gravity Touch.

Various experts have reviewed it. PCMag.com's Jamie Lendino praised the phone's comfortable keyboard, but criticized the phone's sluggish performance.
