= List of HMD Global products =

This is a list of products produced and marketed by mobile phone manufacturer HMD Global. Nokia-branded products shown here overlap with the list of Nokia products article.

== Nokia smartphones ==
=== Nokia one-digit series (2017–2021) ===
Series	Non-decimal generation	x.1 generation	x.2 generation	x.3 generation	x.4 generation
1 series	Nokia 1 Ann. 2018-02-25; Android 8.1–10 (Go Edition); CPU: Cortex-A53	—N/a		Nokia 1.3; Ann. 2020-03-19; Android 10–11 (Go Edition); CPU: Cortex-A53	Nokia 1.4; Ann. 2021-02-03; 10–11 (Go Edition); CPU: Cortex-A53
1 series	Nokia 1 Plus; Ann. 2019-02-24; Android 9–11 (Go Edition); CPU: Cortex-A53	—N/a		Nokia 1.3; Ann. 2020-03-19; Android 10–11 (Go Edition); CPU: Cortex-A53	Nokia 1.4; Ann. 2021-02-03; 10–11 (Go Edition); CPU: Cortex-A53
2 series	Nokia 2 Ann. 2017-10-31; Android 7.1.1 (8.1); CPU: Cortex-A7	Nokia 2.1; Ann. 2018-05-29; Android 8.1–10 (Go Edition); CPU: Cortex-A53	Nokia 2.2; Ann. 2019-06-06; Android 9–11 (Android One); CPU: Cortex-A53	Nokia 2.3; Ann. 2019-12-05; Android 9–11 (Android One); CPU: Cortex-A53	Nokia 2.4; Ann. 2020-09-22; Android 10–12 (Android One); CPU: Cortex-A53
3 series	Nokia 3 Ann. 2017-02-26; Android 7.1.1–9; CPU: Cortex-A53	Nokia 3.1; Ann. 2018-05-29; Android 8.0–10 (Android One); CPU: Cortex-A53	Nokia 3.2; Ann. 2019-02-24; Android 9–11 (Android One); CPU: Cortex-A53	—N/a	Nokia 3.4; Ann. 2020-09-22; Android 10–12 (Android One); CPU: Cortex-A73
3 series	Nokia 3 Ann. 2017-02-26; Android 7.1.1–9; CPU: Cortex-A53	Nokia 3.1 Plus; Ann. 2018-10-11; Android 8.1–10 (Android One); CPU: Cortex-A53	Nokia 3.2; Ann. 2019-02-24; Android 9–11 (Android One); CPU: Cortex-A53	—N/a	Nokia 3.4; Ann. 2020-09-22; Android 10–12 (Android One); CPU: Cortex-A73
4 series	—N/a		Nokia 4.2; Ann. 2019-02-24; Android 9–11 (Android One); CPU: Cortex-A53	—N/a	
5 series	Nokia 5 Ann. 2017-02-26; Android 7.1.1–9; CPU: Cortex-A53	Nokia 5.1; Ann. 2018-05-29; Android 8.0–10 (Android One); CPU: Cortex-A53	—N/a	Nokia 5.3; Ann. 2020-03-19; Android 10–12 (Android One); CPU: Cortex-A73	Nokia 5.4; Ann. 2020-12-15; Android 10–12 (Android One); CPU: Cortex-A73
5 series	Nokia 5 Ann. 2017-02-26; Android 7.1.1–9; CPU: Cortex-A53	Nokia 5.1 Plus; Ann. 2018-08-21; Android 8.1–10 (Android One); CPU: Cortex-A53 in China as Nokia X5	—N/a	Nokia 5.3; Ann. 2020-03-19; Android 10–12 (Android One); CPU: Cortex-A73	Nokia 5.4; Ann. 2020-12-15; Android 10–12 (Android One); CPU: Cortex-A73
6 series	Nokia 6 Ann. 2017-01-08; Android 7.1.1–9; CPU: Cortex-A53	Nokia 6.1; Ann. 2018-01-05; Android 8.1–10 (Android One); CPU: Cortex-A53	Nokia 6.2; Ann. 2019-08-05; Android 9–11 (Android One); CPU: Cortex-A73	—N/a	—N/a
6 series	Nokia 6 Ann. 2017-01-08; Android 7.1.1–9; CPU: Cortex-A53	Nokia 6.1 Plus; Ann. 2018-08-21; Android 8.1–10 (Android One); CPU: Cortex-A73 in China as Nokia X6	Nokia 6.2; Ann. 2019-08-05; Android 9–11 (Android One); CPU: Cortex-A73	—N/a	—N/a
7 series	Nokia 7 (exclusively in China); Ann. 2017-10-18; Android 7.1.1–9; CPU: Cortex-A53	Nokia 7.1; Ann. 2018-10-04; Android 8.1–10 (Android One); CPU: Cortex-A73	Nokia 7.2; Ann. 2019-08-05; Android 9–11 (Android One); CPU: Cortex-A73	—N/a	—N/a
7 series	Nokia 7 Plus; Ann. 2018-02-25; Android 8.1–10 (Android One); CPU: Cortex-A73	Nokia 7.1; Ann. 2018-10-04; Android 8.1–10 (Android One); CPU: Cortex-A73	Nokia 7.2; Ann. 2019-08-05; Android 9–11 (Android One); CPU: Cortex-A73	—N/a	—N/a
8 series	Nokia 8 Ann. 2017-08-16; Android 7.1.1–9; CPU: Cortex-A73	Nokia 8.1; Ann. 2018-12-05; Android 9–11 (Android One); CPU: Cortex-A75 in China as Nokia X7; Ann. 2018-10-16; Android 8.1–9 (Android One)	—N/a	Nokia 8.3 5G; Ann. 2020-03-19; Android 10–12 (Android One); CPU: Cortex-A76 Nokia 8 V 5G UW; Ann. 2020-03-19; Android 10 (Android One); CPU: Cortex-A76	—N/a
8 series	Nokia 8 Sirocco; Ann. 2018-02-25; Android 8.0–10 (Android One); CPU: Cortex-A73	Nokia X71 (only in Taiwan and China); Ann. 2019-04-02; Android 9 (Android One)	—N/a	Nokia 8.3 5G; Ann. 2020-03-19; Android 10–12 (Android One); CPU: Cortex-A76 Nokia 8 V 5G UW; Ann. 2020-03-19; Android 10 (Android One); CPU: Cortex-A76	—N/a
9 series	Nokia 9 PureView; Ann. 2019-02-24; Android 9–10 (Android One); CPU: Cortex-A75	—N/a			

=== Nokia letter-number series (2019–2023) ===
Series	Device name	Date of announcement
C series (Low-end)	Nokia C1	2019-12-11
C series (Low-end)	Nokia C2	2020-03-15
C series (Low-end)	Nokia C2 Tava/Tennen	2020-05-29
C series (Low-end)	Nokia C5 Endi	2020-05-29
C series (Low-end)	Nokia C3	2020-08-04
C series (Low-end)	Nokia C1 Plus	2020-12-14
C series (Low-end)	Nokia C10	2021-04-08
C series (Low-end)	Nokia C20	2021-04-08
C series (Low-end)	Nokia C01 Plus	2021-06-08
C series (Low-end)	Nokia C20 Plus	2021-06-11
C series (Low-end)	Nokia C1 2nd Edition	2021-07-05
C series (Low-end)	Nokia C30	2021-07-26
C series (Low-end)	Nokia C100 (US only)	2022-01-05
C series (Low-end)	Nokia C200 (US only)	2022-01-05
C series (Low-end)	Nokia C2 2nd Edition	2022-02-28
C series (Low-end)	Nokia C21	2022-02-28
C series (Low-end)	Nokia C21 Plus	2022-02-28
C series (Low-end)	Nokia C31	2022-09-01
C series (Low-end)	Nokia C12	2023-01-18
C series (Low-end)	Nokia C02	2023-02-23
C series (Low-end)	Nokia C22	2023-02-25
C series (Low-end)	Nokia C32	2023-02-25
C series (Low-end)	Nokia C12 Pro	2023-03-21
C series (Low-end)	Nokia C12 Plus	2023-04-01
C series (Low-end)	Nokia C110 (US only)	2023-06-02
C series (Low-end)	Nokia C300 (US only)	2023-06-02
C series (Low-end)	Nokia C210 (US only)	2023-08-16
G series (Entry-level)	Nokia G10	2021-04-08
G series (Entry-level)	Nokia G20	2021-04-08
G series (Entry-level)	Nokia G50 5G	2021-09-22
G series (Entry-level)	Nokia G300 5G (US only)	2021-10-12
G series (Entry-level)	Nokia G100 Nokia G100 Verizon (US only)	2022-01-05
G series (Entry-level)	Nokia G400 5G (US only)	2022-01-05
G series (Entry-level)	Nokia G21	2022-02-14
G series (Entry-level)	Nokia G11	2022-02-15
G series (Entry-level)	Nokia G11 Plus	2022-06-29
G series (Entry-level)	Nokia G60 5G	2022-09-01
G series (Entry-level)	Nokia G22	2023-02-25
G series (Entry-level)	Nokia G42 5G	2023-06-28
G series (Entry-level)	Nokia G310 5G (US only)	2023-08-16
X series (Mid-range)	Nokia X71 (China & Taiwan only)	2019-04-10 (Taiwan); 2019-04-17 (China)
X series (Mid-range)	Nokia X10 5G	2021-04-08
X series (Mid-range)	Nokia X20 5G	2021-04-08
X series (Mid-range)	Nokia XR20 5G (rugged)	2021-07-27
X series (Mid-range)	Nokia X100 5G (US only)	2021-11-19
X series (Mid-range)	Nokia X30 5G	2022-09-01
X series (Mid-range)	Nokia XR21 5G (rugged)	2023-05-03

== HMD smartphones ==
Device name	Date of announcement
HMD Pulse	2024-04-26
HMD Pulse+	2024-04-26
HMD Pulse Pro	2024-04-26
HMD Vibe	2024-05-08
HMD XR21	2024-05-14
HMD Aura	2024-05-23
HMD Skyline	2024-07-18
HMD Crest	2024-07-25
HMD Crest Max	2024-07-25
HMD Fusion	2024-09-05
HMD Arc	2024-12-18
HMD Key	2025-01-02
HMD Aura 2	2025-02-11
HMD Ivalo XE	2025-09-09
HMD Vibe 5G	2025-09-11
HMD Luma	2026-02-27
HMD Vibe 2	2026-05-21

== Tablets ==
Device name	Date of announcement
Nokia T20	2021-10-06
Nokia T10	2022-07-12
Nokia T21	2022-09-01
HMD T21	2024-05-08

== Feature phones ==
=== Series 30+ phones ===
This is a table of products running Series 30+ (as well as variants that may run others).

See also: Nokia Originals.

Device name	Release date	Chipset	Display	Network	Bluetooth	Internet	GPS	RAM	Memory	Camera	Flash	microSD support	FM radio	OS	J2ME apps
Nokia 130	2014 (Note: Originally released and sold under Microsoft Mobile)				Bluetooth 3.0					1.8 MP					
Nokia 105 (2015)	2015														
Nokia 222	2015									2 MP					
Nokia 230	2015														
Nokia 216	2016														
Nokia 150	13 Dec 2016		2.4 inches 240 x 320	2G	Bluetooth 3.0	No	No	N/A	N/A	0.3MP	Yes	Yes	Yes	Series 30+	No
Nokia 3310 (2017)	26 Feb 2017		2.4 inches 240 x 320	2G	Bluetooth 3.0	Yes	No	16 MB	16 MB	2 MP	Yes	Yes	Yes	Series 30+	initially yes
Nokia 105 (2017)	17 Jul 2017		1.8 inches 120 x 160	2G	No	No	No	4 MB	4 MB	No	No	No	Yes	Series 30+	No
Nokia 130 (2017)	17 Jul 2017		1.8 inches 120 x 160	2G	Bluetooth 3.0	No	No	4 MB	8 MB	VGA	Yes	Yes	Yes	Series 30+	No
Nokia 3310 3G	1 Sep 2017		2.4 inches 240 x 320	2G/3G	Bluetooth 2.1	Yes	No	N/A	64 MB	2 MP	Yes	Yes	Yes	Smart Feature OS	Yes
Nokia 3310 4G	30 Jan 2018		2.4 inches 240 x 320	2G/3G/4G	Bluetooth 4.0	Yes	No	256 MB	512 MB	2 MP	Yes	Yes	Yes	YunOS	No
Nokia 106 (2018)	14 Nov 2018	Mediatek MT6261D	1.8 inches 120 x 160	2G	No	No	No	4 MB	4 MB	No	No	No	Yes	Series 30+	No
Nokia 210 (2019)	25 Feb 2019	Mediatek MT6260A	2.4 inches 240 x 320	2G	Bluetooth 3.0	Yes	No	N/A	16 MB	0.3 MP	Yes	Yes	Yes	Series 30+	No
Nokia 105 (2019)	24 Jul 2019		1.77 inches 120 x 160	2G	No	No	No	4 MB	4 MB	No	No	No	Yes	Series 30+	No
Nokia 220 4G	24 Jul 2019		2.4 inches 240 x 320	2G/3G/4G	Bluetooth 4.2	Yes	No	16 MB	24 MB	0.3 MP	Yes	Yes	Yes	Smart Feature OS	Yes
Nokia 110 (2019)	5 Sep 2019		1.77 inches 120 x 160	2G	No	No	No	N/A	4 MB	QVGA	Yes	Yes	Yes	Series 30+	No
Nokia 5310 (2020)	19 Mar 2020	Mediatek MT6260A	2.4 inches 240 x 320	2G	Bluetooth 3.0	Yes	No	8 MB	16 MB	VGA	Yes	Yes	Yes	Series 30+	No
Nokia 125	12 May 2020		2.4 inches 240 x 320	2G	No	No	No	4 MB	4 MB	No	Yes	No	Yes	Series 30+	No
Nokia 150 (2020)	12 May 2020		2.4 inches 240 x 320	2G	Bluetooth 3.0	No	No	N/A	4 MB	VGA	Yes	Yes	Yes	Series 30+	No
Nokia 215 4G (2020)	10 Oct 2020	Unisoc UMS9117	2.4 inches 240 x 320	2G/3G/4G	Bluetooth 5.0	Yes	No	64 MB	128 MB	No	No	Yes	Yes	Series 30+	No
Nokia 225 4G (2020)	10 Oct 2020	Unisoc UMS9117	2.4 inches 240 x 320	2G/3G/4G	Bluetooth 5.0	Yes	No	64 MB	128 MB	0.3 MP	No	Yes	Yes	Series 30+	No
Nokia 105 4G (2021)	15 Jun 2021	Unisoc T107	1.8 inches 120 x 160	2G/3G/4G	No	Yes	No	48 MB	128 MB	No	No	No	Yes, wireless	Series 30+	No
Nokia 110 4G (2021)	15 Jun 2021	Unisoc T107	1.8 inches 120 x 160	2G/3G/4G	No	Yes	No	48 MB	128 MB	VGA	Yes	Yes	Yes, wireless	Series 30+	No
Nokia 6310 (2021)	27 Jul 2021	Unisoc 6531F	2.8 inches 240 x 320	2G	Bluetooth 5.0	Yes	No	8 MB	16 MB	VGA	Yes	Yes	Yes, wireless	Series 30+	No
Nokia 105 (2022)	26 Apr 2022	Mediatek MT6261D	1.77 inches 120 x 160	2G	No	No	No	4 MB	4 MB	No	No	No	Yes, wireless	Series 30+	No
Nokia 2660 Flip	12 Jul 2022	Unisoc T107 (22 nm)	2.8 inches 240 x 320 1.77 inches QQVGA	2G/3G/4G	Bluetooth 4.2	Yes	No	48 MB	128 MB	0.3 MP	Yes	Yes	Yes, wireless	Series 30+	No
Nokia 5710 XpressAudio	12 Jul 2022	Unisoc T107 (22 nm)	2.4 inches 240 x 320	2G/3G/4G	Bluetooth 5.0 with built-in TWS earphone	Yes	No	48 MB	128 MB	0.3 MP	Yes	Yes	Yes, wireless	Series 30+	No
Nokia 8210 4G	12 Jul 2022	Unisoc T107 (22 nm)	2.8 inches 240 x 320	2G/3G/4G	Bluetooth 5.0	Yes	No	48 MB	128 MB	0.3 MP	Yes	Yes	Yes, wireless	Series 30+	No
Nokia 110 (2022)	5 Aug 2022		1.77 inches 120 x 160	2G	No	No	No	4 MB	32 MB	VGA	Yes	Yes	Yes, wireless	Series 30+	No
Nokia 105 (2023)	18 May 2023		1.8 inches 120 x 160	2G	No	No	No	N/A	N/A	No	No	No	Yes, wireless	Series 30+	No
Nokia 106 (2023)	18 May 2023		1.8 inches 120 x 160	2G	No	No	No	N/A	N/A	No	No	Yes	Yes, wireless	Series 30+	No
Nokia 110 (2023)	18 May 2023		1.8 inches 120 x 160	2G	No	No	No	N/A	N/A	VGA	Yes	Yes	Yes, wireless	Series 30+	No
Nokia 105 4G (2023)	18 May 2023		1.8 inches 120 x 160	2G/3G/4G	Bluetooth 5.0	Yes	No	N/A	N/A	No	No	Yes	Yes, wireless	Series 30+	No
Nokia 106 4G (2023)	18 May 2023		1.8 inches 120 x 160	2G/3G/4G	Bluetooth 5.0	Yes	No	N/A	N/A	No	No	Yes	Yes, wireless	Series 30+	No
Nokia 110 4G (2023)	18 May 2023		1.8 inches 120 x 160	2G/3G/4G	Bluetooth 5.0	Yes	No	N/A	N/A	VGA	Yes	Yes	Yes, wireless	Series 30+	No
Nokia 130 (2023)	10 Aug 2023		2.4 inches 240 x 320	2G	No	No	No	N/A	4 MB	No	No	Yes	Yes	Series 30+	No
Nokia 150 (2023)	10 Aug 2023		2.4 inches 240 x 320	2G	No	No	No	N/A	4 MB	VGA	Yes	Yes	Yes	Series 30+	No
Nokia 230 (2024)	11 Apr 2024	Unisoc 6531F	2.8 inches 240 x 320	2G	Bluetooth 5.0	No	No	8 MB	16 MB	2 MP	Yes	Yes	Yes, wireless	Series 30+	No
Nokia 5310 (2024)	11 Apr 2024	Unisoc 6531F	2.8 inches 240 x 320	2G	Bluetooth 5.0	No	No	8 MB	16 MB	0.3 MP	Yes	Yes	Yes, wireless	Series 30+	No
Nokia 6310 (2024)	11 Apr 2024	Unisoc 6531F	2.8 inches 240 x 320	2G	Bluetooth 5.0	No	No	8 MB	16 MB	0.3 MP	Yes	Yes	Yes, wireless	Series 30+	No
Nokia 3210 (2024)	28 May 2024	Unisoc		2G/3G/4G	Bluetooth 5.0							Yes	Yes, wireless	Series 30+	No
HMD 105	28 May 2024	Unisoc 6531F	2.8 inches 240x320	4G	Bluetooth 5.0	No	No	4 MB	4 mb	N/A	No	Yes	Yes	Series 30+	No
HMD 110	28 May 2024	Unisoc 6531F	2.8 inches 240x320	4G	Bluetooth 5.0	No	No	4 MB	4 mb	2 MP	No	Yes	Yes	Series 30+	No
HMD Barbie Phone	27 Aug 2024	Unisoc T107		2G/3G/4G		Yes	No			0.3 MP		Yes	Yes, wireless	Series 30+	No
Device name	Release date	Chipset	Display	Network	Bluetooth	Internet	GPS	RAM	Memory	Camera	Flash	microSD support	FM radio	OS	J2ME apps

=== KaiOS phones ===
This is a table of phones that run KaiOS.

Device name	Release date	Chipset	Display	Network	Bluetooth	WiFi	Internet	GPS	RAM	Memory	Camera	Flash	microSD support	FM radio	OS	J2ME apps
Nokia 8110 4G	2018, 25 Feb	Qualcomm MSM8905 Snapdragon 205 (28 nm)	2.4 inches 240 x 320	2G/3G/4G	Bluetooth 4.1	Yes	Yes	Yes	512 MB	4 GB	2 MP	Yes	Yes	Yes	KaiOS 2.5.1	No
Nokia 2720 Flip	2019, 5 Sep	Qualcomm MSM8905 Snapdragon 205 (28 nm)	2.8 inches 240 x 320 1.3 inches 240 x 240	2G/3G/4G	Bluetooth 4.2	Yes	Yes	Yes	512 MB	4 GB	2 MP	Yes	Yes	Yes	KaiOS 2.5.2	No
Nokia 800 Tough	2019, 5 Sep	Qualcomm MSM8905 Snapdragon 205 (28 nm)	2.4 inches 240 x 320	2G/3G/4G	Bluetooth 4.1	Yes	Yes	Yes	512 MB	4 GB	2 MP	Yes	Yes	Yes	KaiOS 2.5.2	No
Nokia 6300 4G	2020, 13 Nov	Qualcomm QC8909 Snapdragon 210 (28 nm)	2.4 inches 240 x 320	2G/3G/4G	Bluetooth 4.0	Yes	Yes	Yes	512 MB	4 GB	VGA	Yes	Yes	Yes	KaiOS 2.5	No
Nokia 8000 4G	2020, 13 Nov	Qualcomm QC8909 Snapdragon 210 (28 nm)	2.4 inches 240 x 320	2G/3G/4G	Bluetooth 4.1	Yes	Yes	Yes	512 MB	4 GB	2 MP	Yes	Yes	Yes	KaiOS 2.5	No
Nokia 2720 V Flip	2021, 14 May	Qualcomm MSM8905 Snapdragon 205 (28 nm)	2.8 inches 240 x 320 1.3 inches 240 x 240	2G/3G/4G	Bluetooth 4.1	Yes	Yes	Yes	512 MB	4 GB	2 MP	Yes	Yes	No	KaiOS 2.5.2	No
Nokia 2760 Flip	2022, 3 Mar	Qualcomm MSM8905 Snapdragon 205 (28 nm)	2.8 inches 240 x 320 1.77 inches	2G/3G/4G	Bluetooth 4.2	Yes	Yes	Yes	512 MB	4 GB	5 MP	Yes	No	No	KaiOS 3.1	No
Nokia 2780 Flip	2022, 15 Nov	Qualcomm QM215 Snapdragon 215 (28 nm)	2.7 inches 240 x 320 1.77 inches	2G/3G/4G	Bluetooth 4.2	Yes	Yes	Yes	512 MB	4 GB	5 MP	Yes	Yes	Yes	KaiOS 3.1	No
HMD Barbie Phone	2024, 27 Aug	Qualcomm 215		2G/3G/4G		Yes	Yes	Yes	512 MB	4 GB	5 MP	Yes	Yes	Yes	KaiOS 3.1	No
Device name	Release date	Chipset	Display	Network	Bluetooth	WiFi	Internet	GPS	RAM	Memory	Camera	Flash	microSD support	FM radio	OS	J2ME apps

== Services ==
- HMD Connect (roaming) – discontinued on 15 December 2022.
- HMD Mobile (SIM card operator in the UK) – discontinued in July 2023.
