= Nokia 2.3 =

Smartphone

- Brand: Nokia
- Developer: HMD Global
- Manufacturer: Foxconn
- Type: Smartphone
- First released: December 2019
- Predecessor: Nokia 2.2
- Successor: Nokia 2.4
- Related: Nokia 3.2; Nokia 4.2; Nokia 6.2; Nokia 7.2; Nokia 9 PureView
- Dimensions: 157.7×75.4×8.7 mm (6.21×2.97×0.34 in)
- Weight: 183 g (6 oz)
- Operating system: Android 9.0 "Pie" (Android One); Current: Android 11
- System-on-chip: Mediatek MT6761 Helio A22 (12nm)
- CPU: Quad-core ARM Cortex-A53 @ 2.0 GHz
- GPU: PowerVR GE8320 @ 660 MHz
- Memory: 2 GB
- Storage: 32 GB
- Removable storage: microSD, up to 400 GB
- Battery: 4000 mAH non-removable Li-ion
- Rear camera: 13 MP f2.2 1.12 µm 2 MP depth sensor
- Front camera: 5 MP
- Display: 6.2" (15.7cm/95.9cm²) 19:9 720x1520p IPS LCD
- Website: www.hmd.com/en_int/nokia-2-3

The Nokia 2.3 is a Nokia-branded low-end smartphone launched in December 2019 running the Android operating system.

== Design ==
The Nokia 2.3 is 183 g and 8.7 mm thin. It has a dewdrop notch and thin bezels with a chin at the bottom with the Nokia logo. It does not have a fingerprint sensor; however, it does have Nokia face unlock. The Nokia 2.3, like x.2 series of Nokia phones, has a dedicated Google Assistant button on the left of the phone which can be pressed to quickly activate the Google Assistant or held and released for the Google Assistant to start and stop listening. The phone can be bought in 3 colours, Cyan Green, Sand & Charcoal. It charges via a microUSB port on the bottom and it has a headphone jack located at the top.

== Cameras ==
It has two cameras on the back of the phone, a 13 MP main sensor and a 2 MP depth sensor. On the front there is a single 5MP sensor. Its rear cameras have a dedicated night mode to take better pictures in low-light conditions. It films at 1080p 30 fps and supports auto HDR when taking photos which can also manually be turned on and off.

== Reception ==
Android Police criticized the Nokia 2.3 for still using a microUSB port over USB C, however praised the extra camera on the back. They say "The 2.3 hones in on that streamlining, enlarges a couple of aspects, but mostly retains much of the kit from the last go around."

Trusted Reviews say the most impressive part of the 2.3 is its two-day battery life. They also say the phone being part of the Android One program is a stand-out feature.
