= Nokia 8.1 =

Android smartphone released in 2018

Nokia 8.1 / X7
- Also known as: Nokia X7 (China)
- Brand: Nokia
- Developer: HMD Global
- Manufacturer: Foxconn
- Type: Smartphone
- First released: December 6, 2018; 7 years ago
- Predecessor: Nokia 8 Nokia 7.1
- Successor: Nokia 8.3 5G; Nokia X71
- Related: Nokia 1 Nokia 2.1; Nokia 3.1; Nokia 5.1; Nokia 6.1; Nokia 6.1 Plus; Nokia 7.1; Nokia 7 Plus; Nokia 8 Sirocco
- Dimensions: 154.8 mm × 75.8 mm × 8 mm (6.09 in × 2.98 in × 0.31 in)
- Weight: 180 g (6.3 oz)
- Operating system: Original: Android 9 "Pie"; Current: Android 11 (Android One)
- System-on-chip: Qualcomm Snapdragon 710 (10 nm)
- CPU: Octa-core (2x2.2 GHz 360 Gold & 6x1.7 GHz Kryo 360 Silver)
- GPU: Adreno 616
- Memory: 4 or 6 GB LPDDR4 RAM
- Storage: 64 or 128 GB
- Removable storage: microSD, up to 400 GB
- Battery: 3500 mAh Li-ion, non-removable
- Rear camera: Dual Camera Set-up: 12 MP (f/1.8, 1/2.55", 1.4 μm, dual pixel PDAF, OIS); 13 MP; ZEISS optics, dual-LED dual-tone flash, panorama, HDR; Video: 4K@30fps, 1080p@30fps (gyro-EIS)
- Front camera: 20 MP (f/2.0, 1/3", 0.9 μm) Wide; Video: 1080p@30fps
- Display: 6.18 in (15.7 cm) (95.3 cm^{2}) 1080p FHD+ IPS LCD with HDR10 and NEG protection, ~408 ppi pixel density
- Connectivity: 3.5 mm TRRS headphone jack; Bluetooth 5.0; USB 2.0 via USB-C port; NFC
- Data inputs: Sensors: Fingerprint scanner (rear-mounted); Accelerometer; Gyroscope; Proximity sensor; Electronic compass; Hall sensor
- Model: TA-1128
- Website: www.hmd.com/en_int/nokia-8-1

The Nokia 8.1, also known as the Nokia X7 in China, is a Nokia-branded mid-range smartphone by HMD Global, running the Android One variant of Android. It was announced on 6 December 2018.
