= Nokia 5.1 Plus =

Smartphone model

Nokia 5.1 Plus / X5
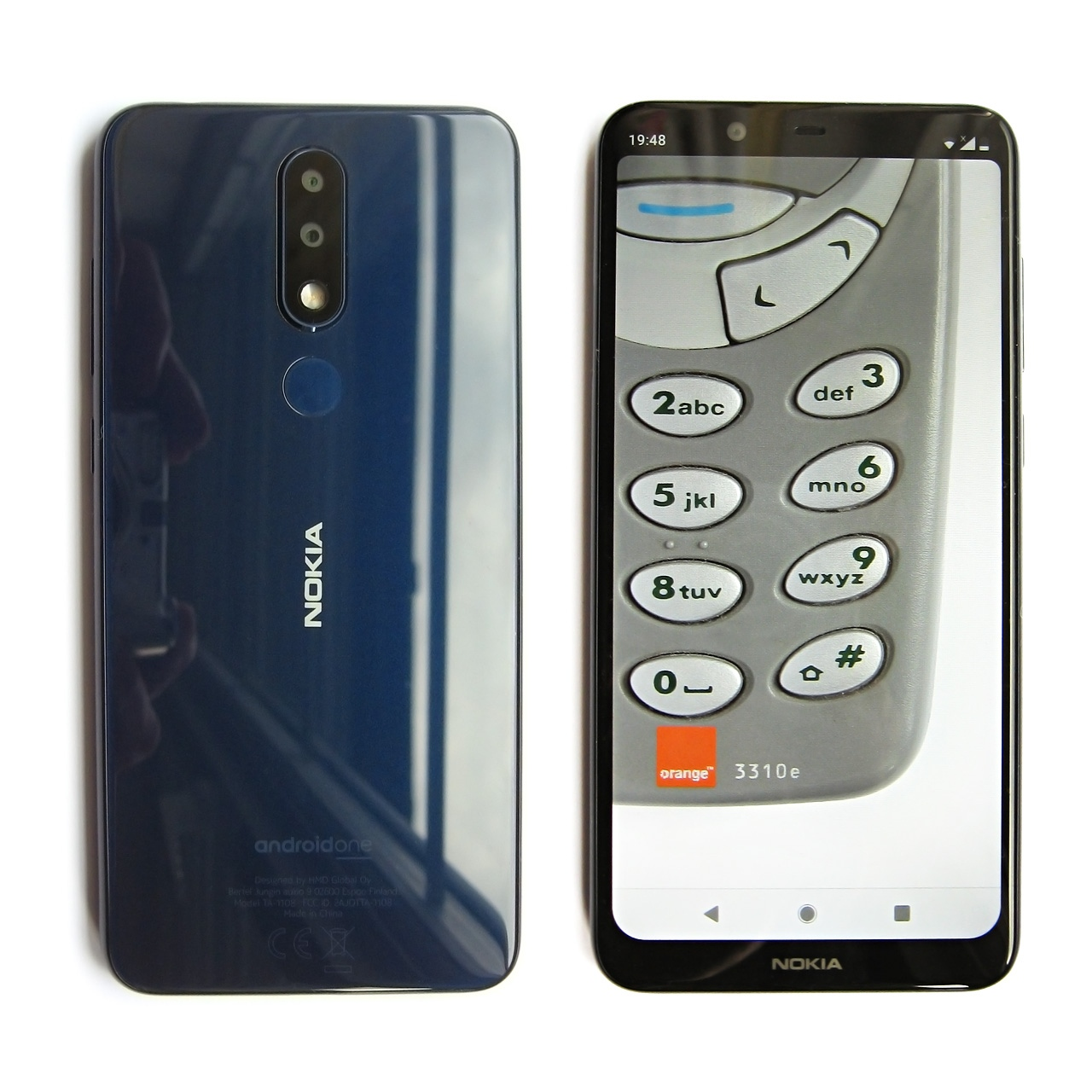
- Nokia 5.1 Plus in blue
- Brand: Nokia
- Developer: HMD Global
- Manufacturer: Foxconn
- Type: Smartphone
- Availability by region: 2018
- Predecessor: Nokia 5.1
- Related: Nokia 1 Nokia 2.1; Nokia 3.1; Nokia 6.1 Plus; Nokia 7.1; Nokia 7 Plus; Nokia 8 Sirocco; Nokia 8110 4G; Nokia 9 PureView
- Dimensions: 149.5 x 72 x 8.1 mm (5.89 x 2.83 x 0.32 in)
- Weight: 160 g (5.64 oz)
- Operating system: Original: Android 8.1 "Oreo"; Current: Android 10 "Q" (Android One)
- System-on-chip: Mediatek MT6771 Helio P60 (12 nm)
- CPU: Octa-core (4x1.8 GHz Cortex A-73 & 4x1.8 GHz Cortex A-53) (Global); Octa-core (4x2.0 GHz Cortex-A73 & 4x2.0 GHz Cortex-A53) (China)
- GPU: Mali-G72 MP3
- Memory: 3, 4 or 6 GB RAM
- Storage: 32 or 64 GB
- Removable storage: microSD, up to 400 GB
- Battery: Non-removable Li-ion 3060 mAh
- Rear camera: 13 MP, f/2.0, PDAF; 5 MP, f/2.4 (depth); LED flash, HDR, Panorama; Video: 1080p@30fps
- Front camera: 8 MP, f/2.2, 26mm (wide); Video: 1080p@30fps
- Display: IPS LCD Size: 5.86 inches, 85.7 cm2 (~79.6% screen-to-body ratio) Resolution: 720 x 1520 pixels, 19:9 ratio (~287 ppi density)
- Website: https://www.hmd.com/en_int/nokia-5-plus

The Nokia 5.1 Plus (also sold as the Nokia X5) is a 2018 mid-range Android smartphone, launched by HMD Global in China. The Nokia 5.1 Plus features a 19:9 aspect ratio, a 5.9-inch HD+ screen, dual cameras, and a notch, among other style features. The Nokia 5.1 Plus runs Android 8.1 Oreo, and for its processor, it is powered by a MediaTek Helio P60 SoC. The Nokia 5.1 Plus launched with 3 or 4 GB of RAM and with 32 or 64 GB of storage, which is expandable up to 400 GB via microSD.
