= Nokia 2.2 =

Nokia-branded entry-level smartphone

- Brand: Nokia
- Developer: HMD Global
- Manufacturer: Foxconn
- Type: Smartphone
- First released: June 2019
- Predecessor: Nokia 2.1
- Successor: Nokia 2.3
- Related: Nokia 1 Plus; Nokia 3.2; Nokia 4.2; Nokia 5.1 Plus; Nokia 6.2; Nokia 7.2; Nokia 9 PureView
- Dimensions: 146×70.6×9.3 mm (5.75×2.78×0.37 in)
- Weight: 153 g (5 oz)
- Operating system: Android 9.0 "Pie" (Android One), upgradeable to Android 11
- System-on-chip: Mediatek MT6761 Helio A22 (12nm)
- CPU: Quad-core ARM Cortex-A53 @ 2.0 GHz
- GPU: PowerVR GE8320 @ 660 MHz
- Memory: 2 or 3 GB
- Storage: 16 or 32 GB
- Removable storage: microSD, up to 400 GB
- Battery: User-removable Li-ion 3000 mAH
- Rear camera: 13 MP 1080p @ 30 FPS video
- Front camera: 5 MP
- Display: 5.71" (14.5cm//81.4cm^{2}) 19:9 720×1520 px IPS LCD
- Codename: Wasp
- Website: www.hmd.com/en_int/nokia-2-2

The Nokia 2.2 is a Nokia-branded entry-level Android smartphone released in June 2019. It is the successor to Nokia 2.1.

== Specifications ==
=== Design ===
The Nokia 2.2 weighs 153 g and is 9.3 mm thin. The phone is made of a solid polycarbonate body with a high-gloss finish, and is available in two colours: Black or Steel.

The device front has a dewdrop notch and relatively thin bezels, with a chin at the bottom with the Nokia logo. The overall design and size are similar to that of the mid-range Nokia 6.1 Plus/X6. Like many other entry-level phones, the dewdrop notch cannot be hidden.

=== Hardware ===
The device has a MediaTek Helio A22 SoC with 3 GB of RAM and 32 GB of storage. In some regions, a lower-cost variant with 2 GB of RAM and 16 GB storage is also offered.

The Nokia 2.2 has a single 13-megapixel camera on the back and a 5 MP camera on the front. Its rear camera has a dedicated night mode to take better pictures in low-light conditions.

Like other Nokia phones of this generation, the Nokia 2.2 has a dedicated Google Assistant button on the left of the phone, which can be pressed to quickly activate the Google Assistant, or held and released for the Google Assistant to start and stop listening.

The phone has a user-removable 3000 mAh battery, and a microUSB port. This is HMD Global's third device with removable battery, the first two being Nokia 1 and Nokia 1 Plus.

=== Software ===
The Nokia 2.2, unlike its predecessors, runs on Android One instead of Android Go due to its increased RAM and storage capacity. The device is updatable to Android 11.

== Reception ==
The Nokia 2.2 has received mixed reviews. Vignesh Giridharan of Digit stated: "With its overall low performance and low value for money, the Nokia 2.2 exists in the market only to remind you that there are superior models in the market for a slightly higher asking price, like the Nokia 4.2 and Redmi 7.".

On the other hand, Damien Wilde of 9to5Google praised the phone, saying "While the Nokia 2.2 is a nice little oddity in a market of high-end flagships and mid-range value for money, in all honesty, you’re still far better off getting a used device or just upping your budget a little further for an overall better smartphone. The Pixel 3a is still the outright benchmark for budget phones in the US, and you’d be far better off grabbing one over the Nokia 2.2 if you value performance and overall experience".
