= Nokia 6.2 =

Android smartphone manufactured by HMD Global

- Brand: Nokia
- Developer: HMD Global
- Manufacturer: Foxconn
- Type: Smartphone
- Predecessor: Nokia 6.1
- Successor: Nokia 5.3; Nokia 5.4; Nokia G42 5G
- Related: Nokia 2.2; Nokia 3.2; Nokia 4.2; Nokia 6.1 Plus; Nokia 7.2; Nokia 9 PureView
- Dimensions: H: 159.9 mm (6.30 in); W: 75.1 mm (2.96 in); D: 8.3 mm (0.33 in)
- Weight: 180 g (6.3 oz)
- Operating system: Original: Android 9 "Pie"; Current: Android 11 (Android One)
- System-on-chip: Qualcomm Snapdragon 636 (14 nm)
- CPU: Octa-core (4x1.8 GHz Kryo 260 Gold & 4x1.6 GHz Kryo 260 Silver)
- GPU: Adreno 509
- Memory: 3 or 4 GB LPDDR4 RAM
- Storage: 32, 64 or 128 GB
- Removable storage: microSD, up to 512 GB
- Battery: 3500 mAh Li-Po, non-removable
- Rear camera: Triple Camera Set-up: 16 MP (f/1.8, 27mm, 1.0 μm, PDAF) Wide; 8 MP (f/2.2, 13mm, 1/4.0", 1.12 μm) Ultrawide 0.6x Zoom; 5 MP (f/2.4) Depth; ZEISS optics, phase detection autofocus, dual-LED dual-tone flash, panorama, HDR; Video: 4K@30fps, 1080p@30fps
- Front camera: 8 MP (f/2.0, 1/4.0", 1.12 μm), autofocus, HDR; Video: 1080p@30fps
- Display: 6.3 in (16 cm) (99.1 cm^{2}) 1080p IPS LCD with Gorilla Glass 3 protection, ~400 ppi pixel density
- Connectivity: 3.5 mm TRRS headphone jack; Bluetooth 5.0; USB 2.0 via USB-C port; NFC
- Data inputs: Sensors: Accelerometer; Electronic compass; Fingerprint scanner (rear-mounted); Gyroscope; Proximity sensor
- Website: https://www.hmd.com/en_int/nokia-6-2

The Nokia 6.2 is an Android smartphone designed by HMD Global. It was announced at IFA Berlin on 6 September 2019, with two models launching at costs of €199 and €249.

== Specifications ==
=== Design ===
The Nokia 6.2 has a 6.3-inch display with a 19:9 aspect ratio and is nearly bezel-less, with a dewdrop notch at the top. The display is HDR10 certified with 1 billion colours and real time SDR to HDR conversion. The phone weighs 180 g (6.3 oz).

The Nokia 6.2 has three cameras: a main sensor, an ultrawide sensor, and a depth sensor. The phone has a dedicated night mode, which helps improve low-light photography. The smartphone also features Nokia face iD, which is made by Truly Secure.

Another change on the exterior of the phone is the addition of a dedicated Google Assistant button on the left of the phone. This can be pressed to quickly activate the Google Assistant or held and released for the Google Assistant to start and stop listening. It can also be remapped in Settings to open an app of the user's choice.

The phone has a smooth metallic finish and a satin glass back, rather than the milled aluminium 6000 back found in the Nokia 6.1 and 6.

=== Internal components ===
The Nokia 6.2 comes with the Snapdragon 636 system on a chip (SoC). It has a 3,500 mAh battery with a maximum storage of 512 GB.

== Models ==
The €199 model comes with 3 GB RAM (random access memory) and 32 GB storage, whereas the €249 model comes with 4 GB RAM and 64 GB storage. A more expensive model with 4 GB RAM and 128 GB storage will be available in some countries in the future.

The Nokia 6.2 comes in two colours: Ceramic Black and Ice.

== Reception ==
Reviews for the Nokia 6.2 were mostly positive.

TechRadar stated, "The Nokia 6.2 looks to be a strong contender at the affordable end of the Android smartphone market".

Gizmochina gave the phone an 8.4 out of 10.

Trusted Reviews said, "the screen looks great – especially for this price" and "With its three cameras on the back, nice-looking display and Android One software, the Nokia 6.2 looks like it could be a rival to the Moto G series and the likes of Redmi, Realme and Honor."

GSMArena said that "the colours looked nice and outdoor visibility was okay" and said it's "reasonably well specced for the segment it needs to fight in". They also commented on the charging, saying "We're not too thrilled about the 5V/2A charging capabilities - it'll take a while to fill...[the] 3,500mAh batteries."

== See also ==
Differences between Nokia 6.2 and 7.2
