= Nokia 7.1 =

Nokia mobile phone

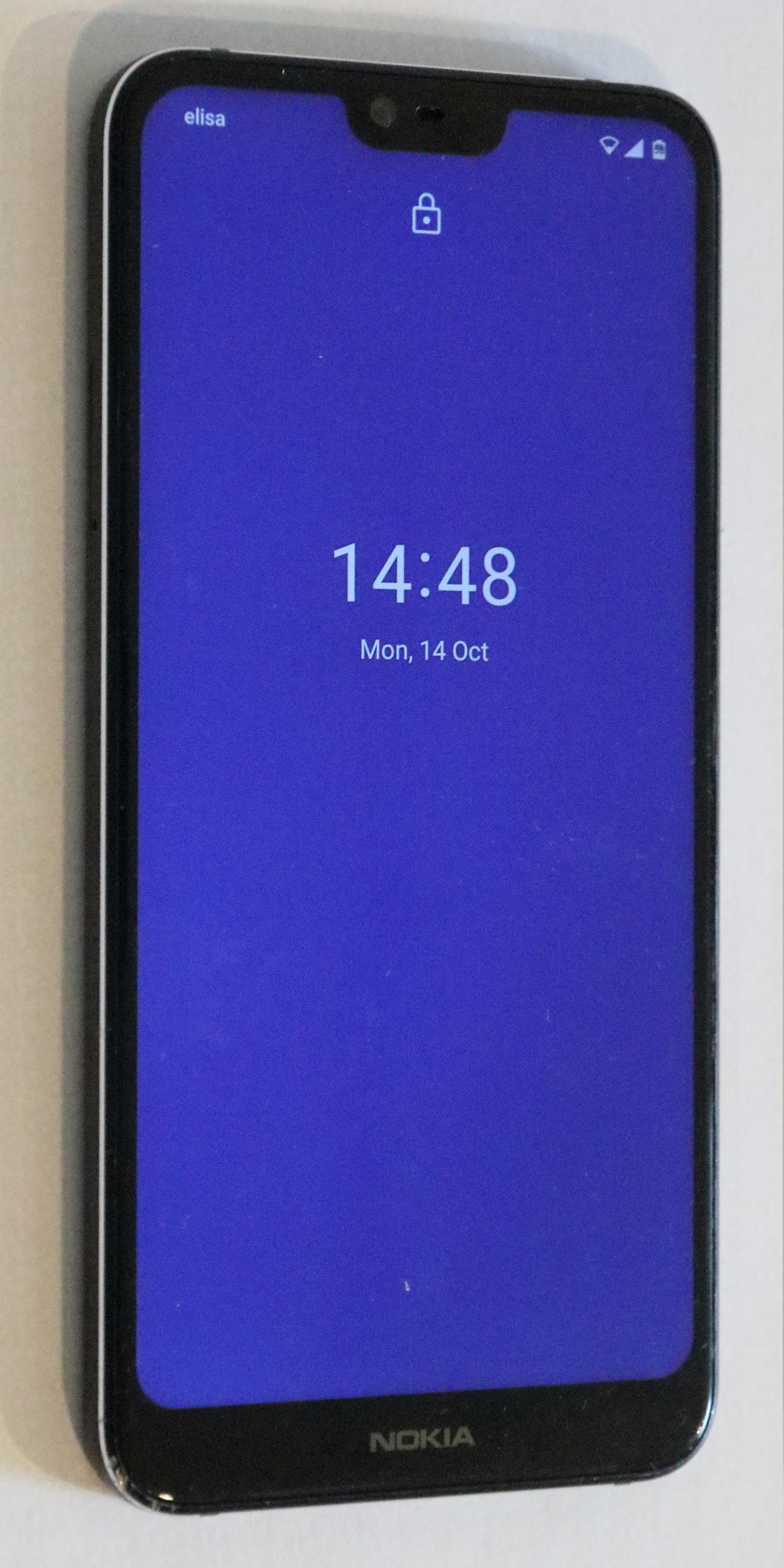
- Brand: Nokia
- Developer: HMD Global
- Manufacturer: Foxconn
- Type: Smartphone
- First released: 28 October 2018; 7 years ago
- Discontinued: July 2019; 6 years ago
- Predecessor: Nokia 7
- Successor: Nokia 7.2; Nokia 8.1 (X7)
- Related: Nokia 2.1; Nokia 3.1; Nokia 5.1; Nokia 6.1; Nokia 7 Plus; Nokia 8 Sirocco; Nokia 9 PureView
- Dimensions: 149.7 mm × 71.2 mm × 8 mm (5.89 in × 2.80 in × 0.31 in)
- Weight: 160 g (5.6 oz)
- Operating system: Original: Android 8.1 "Oreo"; Current: Android 10 (Android One)
- System-on-chip: Qualcomm Snapdragon 636 (14 nm)
- CPU: Octa-core (4x1.8 GHz Kryo 260 Gold & 4x1.6 GHz Kryo 260 Silver)
- GPU: Adreno 509
- Memory: 3 or 4 GB RAM
- Storage: 32 or 64 GB
- Removable storage: microSD, up to 400 GB
- Battery: 3060 mAh Li-ion, Non-removable
- Rear camera: Dual Camera Set-up: 12 MP (f/1.8, 1.28 μm, dual pixel PDAF); 5 MP (f/2.4) Depth; ZEISS optics, dual-LED dual-tone flash, panorama, HDR; Video: 4K@30fps, 1080p@30fps (gyro-EIS)
- Front camera: 8 MP (f/2.0, 24mm); Video: 1080p@30fps
- Display: 5.84 in (14.8 cm) (85.1 cm^{2}) 1080p IPS LCD with HDR10 and Gorilla Glass 3 protection, ~432 ppi pixel density
- Connectivity: 3.5 mm TRRS headphone jack; Bluetooth 5.0; USB 3.1 via USB-C port
- Data inputs: Sensors: Fingerprint scanner (rear-mounted); Accelerometer; Gyroscope; Proximity sensor; Electronic compass
- Model: TA-1100 (Europe); TA-1097 (unknown); TA-1085 (America); TA-1095 (Europe and Middle East); TA-1096 (North America)
- Codename: HMD Rooster
- Other: NFC, IP54 dust and splash resistance
- Website: www.hmd.com/en_int/nokia-7-1

The Nokia 7.1 is a discontinued Nokia-branded mid-range smartphone by HMD Global. It was launched on October 5, 2018, and released on October 28. It is an upgraded version of the Nokia 7, featuring a Qualcomm Snapdragon 636 processor. It was discontinued in July 2019.

== See also ==
- Nokia X7-00
- Nokia 3310 (2017)
- Nokia Lumia 730
- Nokia Lumia 735
