= Nokia 7.2 =

Android smartphone model produced by HMD Global

- Brand: Nokia
- Developer: HMD Global
- Manufacturer: Foxconn
- Type: Smartphone
- Predecessor: Nokia 7.1; Nokia 7 Plus
- Successor: Nokia X20
- Related: Nokia 2.2; Nokia 3.2; Nokia 4.2; Nokia 6.2; Nokia 9 PureView
- Dimensions: H: 159.9 mm (6.30 in); W: 75.2 mm (2.96 in); D: 8.3 mm (0.33 in)
- Weight: 180 g (6.3 oz)
- Operating system: Original: Android 9 "Pie"; Current: Android 11 (Android One)
- System-on-chip: Qualcomm Snapdragon 660 (14 nm)
- CPU: Octa-core (4x2.2 GHz Kryo 260 Gold & 4x1.8 GHz Kryo 260 Silver)
- GPU: Adreno 512
- Memory: 4 or 6 GB LPDDR4 RAM
- Storage: 64 or 128 GB
- Removable storage: microSD, up to 512 GB
- Battery: 3500 mAh Li-Po, non-removable
- Rear camera: Triple Camera Set-up: 48 MP (f/1.8, 1/2.0", 0.8 μm, PDAF) Wide; 8 MP (f/2.2, 13mm, 1/4.0", 1.12 μm) Ultrawide; 5 MP (f/2.4) Depth; ZEISS optics, LED flash, panorama, HDR; Video: 4K@30fps, 1080p@30fps (gyro-EIS)
- Front camera: 20 MP (f/2.0, 1/3", 0.9 μm) ZEISS optics, HDR; Video: 1080p@30fps
- Display: 6.3 in (16 cm) (99.1 cm^{2}) 1080p IPS LCD with HDR10 and Gorilla Glass 3 protection, ~400 ppi pixel density
- Connectivity: 3.5 mm TRRS headphone jack; Bluetooth 5.0; USB 2.0 via USB-C port; NFC
- Data inputs: Sensors: Accelerometer; Electronic compass; Fingerprint scanner (rear-mounted); Gyroscope; Proximity sensor
- Website: https://www.hmd.com/en_int/nokia-7-2

The Nokia 7.2 is an Android smartphone produced by HMD Global. The 7.2 was announced on 6 September 2019 at IFA and prices at launch started at $349 (£249) for the cheapest model.

== Changes from the Nokia 7.1 ==
The Nokia 7.2 has three rear cameras, including a 0.6x zoom ultrawide camera, and one front camera. The main rear camera is a 48 MP camera that is set to 12 MP by default, improving the quality of the camera, in terms of megapixels, in comparison the Nokia 808 PureView and Lumia 1020. A dedicated night mode camera was introduced in the 7.2, which claims to help "improve low-light photography".

The screen is larger than on the 7.1, with 99.1 cm^{2} (6.3") instead of 85.1 cm^{2} (5.84"). The display has a smaller chin and bezels, along with a thinner dewdrop notch at the top. The 7.2 is heavier, weighing 180g rather than the 160g of the Nokia 7.1. The addition of Nokia Face ID, made by Truly Secure, has also been added to the software of the 7.2.

In terms of the phone's exterior, there is a dedicated Google Assistant button on the left of the phone, which can be pressed to quickly activate the Google Assistant, or held and released for the Google Assistant to start and stop listening. It can also be re-mapped in the phone settings to open an app of choice.

The 7.2 has a more powerful SoC, with a Snapdragon 660 rather than a 636. The 7.2 comes with a 3500 mAh battery, while the 7.1 has 3060 mAh. However, the 7.2 does not support fast charging and the phone charges at 10 Watts instead of 18. Expandable storage has increased from 400 to 512 GB.

== Differences between the Nokia 7.2 and 6.2 ==
Although the Nokia 7.2 and 6.2 are very similar phones and almost identical in appearance, there are a few differences between them. The biggest difference is the cameras. The main rear and front cameras of the 7.2 have a higher megapixel count than the 6.2 (48 MP to 16 MP and 20 MP to 8 MP respectively). Unlike the 6.2, the camera app on the 7.2 has Zeiss branded effects that aim to replicate the effects of Zeiss lenses. Additionally, the Nokia 7.2 claims to take better low-light photos.

In terms of core processes the 7.2 comes with the more powerful Snapdragon 660 (rather than 636) processor and comes with 4-6 GB of RAM instead of 3-4 GB. The storage also starts at 64 GB rather than 32. The Nokia 7.2 comes in colors including Charcoal, Cyan Green, and Ice, while the Nokia 6.2 comes in Ceramic Black and Ice.

== Models ==
The global version of the phone comes in 3 models: 4 GB of RAM with 64 GB of storage; 6 GB of RAM with 64 GB of storage; and 6 GB of RAM with 128 GB of storage. The Chilean version of the Nokia 7.2 (TA-1178) comes with 4 GB of RAM and 128 GB of internal storage.

== Reception ==
The Verge said the Nokia 7.2 is "competent and almost as good as the [Google] Pixel 3A", calling it Nokia's "most confident creation yet". The 7.2 was given a score of 7/10.

Digital Trends said that the phone "aims high but misses the mark", giving it a 6/10 score.
