= Nokia 3.2 =

Nokia branded entry-level smartphone

- Brand: Nokia
- Developer: HMD Global
- Manufacturer: Foxconn
- Type: Smartphone
- First released: 21 May 2019
- Predecessor: Nokia 3.1
- Successor: Nokia 3.4
- Related: Nokia 2.2; Nokia 4.2; Nokia 6.2; Nokia 7.2; Nokia 9 PureView
- Dimensions: 159.4×76.2×8.6 mm (6.28×3.00×0.34 in)
- Weight: 181 g (6 oz)
- Operating system: Original: Android 9.0 "Pie"; Current: Android 11.0 (Android One)
- System-on-chip: Qualcomm Snapdragon 429 (12nm)
- CPU: Quad-core ARM Cortex-A53 @ 1.8 GHz
- GPU: Adreno 504
- Memory: 2/3 GB
- Storage: 16/32 GB
- Removable storage: microSD, up to 400 GB
- Battery: 4000 mAH Non-removable Li-ion, charges at 10W
- Rear camera: Single 13 MP with flash.
- Front camera: 5 MP
- Display: 6.26" (15.9cm/97.8cm²) 19:9 720x1520p IPS LCD
- Sound: Speaker + 3.5mm Headphone Jack
- Connectivity: MicroUSB 2.0, 3.5mm Headphone Jack, MicroSD slot, Bluetooth 4.2, GPS, FM Radio & Wi-Fi b/g/n
- Website: www.hmd.com/en_int/nokia-3-2

The Nokia 3.2 is a Nokia-branded entry-level smartphone released 21 May 2019 running the Android operating system.

== Models ==
The phone comes in 3 variants: the 2/16 GB, 3/32 GB and 3/64 GB storages, and have two colour variants the gray & black.

== Design ==
The phone has a plastic body. It has dual sim support and a screen to body ratio of ~80.5%.
