= Nokia 3.1 Plus =

2018 smartphone by HMD Global

- Brand: Nokia
- Developer: HMD Global
- Manufacturer: Foxconn
- Type: Smartphone
- Family: Single digit Series
- First released: October 2018
- Predecessor: Nokia 3
- Related: Nokia 3.1; Nokia 6.1 Plus
- Dimensions: 156.9 mm (6.18 in) H 76.4 mm (3.01 in) W 8.2 mm (0.32 in) D
- Weight: 180 g (6 oz)
- Operating system: Original: Android 8.1 "Oreo"; Current: Android 10 (Android One)
- System-on-chip: Global edition - MediaTek MT6762N(12nm), US edition - Qualcomm Snapdragon 439(12nm)
- CPU: Octa-Core Cortex-A53, Global edition @ 2.0 GHz, US edition 2 cores @ 1.95 GHz, 6 cores @ 1.45 GHz
- GPU: Global edition PowerVR GE8320, US edition Adreno 505
- Memory: 2/3 GB
- Storage: 16/32 GB
- Removable storage: microSDXC, expandable up to 256 GB
- Battery: 3,500 mAh Non-removable, Li-ion
- Rear camera: 13 MP AF, F/2.0, LED Flash; 5 MP Depth Sensor, F/2.4
- Front camera: 8 MP AF, F/2.2
- Display: 6.0 in (150 mm) diagonal IPS LCD, with scratch-resistant Corning Gorilla Glass; 1440x720 px 18:9 aspect ratio 268 ppi
- Sound: 3.5 mm jack Single speaker
- Connectivity: Micro USB (USB 2.0), USB OTG, Wi-Fi, Bluetooth, GPS
- Data inputs: Multi-touch screen Fingerprint rear-mountedAccelerometer; Ambient light sensor Digital Compass; Gyroscope; Proximity sensor
- Website: www.hmd.com/en_int/nokia-3-plus

Nokia 3.1 Plus is a Nokia branded smartphone from HMD Global and is the larger variant of the Nokia 3.1. It was publicly introduced in October 2018 and is aimed at the budget smartphone market. One of its most visible features is the presence of a rear mount fingerprint sensor and dual cameras.

This phone is part of Google's Android One program, meaning it will receive at least 2 years of software updates and 3 years of security updates.

== Reception ==
This phone was relatively well received, often being praised for its build quality, display, battery life, and camera, although performance was generally criticized for being sluggish. It has also been criticised for its lack of fast charging and having a MicroUSB port instead of USB C. The Nokia 3.1 Plus also happens to be among the first to be available through a US carrier, Cricket Wireless, making it more accessible to a wider range of people.
