= Nokia C series (Cricket Wireless) =

Series of Android powered phones by Nokia

The Nokia C series is a series of entry-level Android-powered Nokia-branded smartphones initially sold exclusively by Cricket Wireless. As of June 2020, the series consists only of the Nokia C5 Endi, which is a midrange smartphone, and the Nokia C2 Tava and Nokia C2 Tennen, which are entry-level smartphones.

== Nokia C2 Tava / Tennen ==
Nokia C2 Tava Nokia C2 Tennen
- Brand: Nokia
- Developer: HMD Global
- Manufacturer: Foxconn
- Type: Smartphone
- Related: Nokia C2; Nokia 2 V Tella
- Dimensions: H: 150.6 mm (5.93 in); W: 72.4 mm (2.85 in); D: 9.1 mm (0.36 in)
- Weight: 180 g (6.3 oz)
- Operating system: Original: Android 10
- System-on-chip: MediaTek Helio A22 (16 nm)
- CPU: Quad-core 2.0 GHz Cortex-A53
- GPU: PowerVR GE8320
- Memory: 2 GB LPDDR3 RAM
- Storage: 16 or 32 GB
- Removable storage: microSD, up to 128 GB
- Battery: 3000 mAh Li-Po, removable
- Rear camera: Dual Camera Set-up: 8 MP, autofocus; 2 MP; LED flash, HDR, panorama Video: 1080p@30fps
- Front camera: 5 MP; Video: 720p@30fps
- Display: 5.45 in (13.8 cm) (76.7 cm^{2}) 720p IPS LCD, ~295 ppi pixel density
- Connectivity: 3.5 mm TRRS headphone jack; Bluetooth 4.2; USB 2.0 via USB-C port
- Data inputs: Sensors: Accelerometer; Proximity sensor
- Website: www.hmd.com/en_us/nokia-c-2-tava (Tava) www.hmd.com/en_us/nokia-c-2-tennen (Tennen)

The Nokia C2 Tava and Nokia C2 Tennen are two Android-powered Nokia-branded smartphones released by HMD Global. They were announced on May 29, 2020, alongside the Nokia C5 Endi. The devices were made exclusively for sale under agreement with Cricket Wireless.

=== Specifications ===
==== Software ====
The Nokia C2 Tava and Nokia C2 Tennen were originally released with Android 10.

==== Hardware ====
The Nokia C2 Tava and Nokia C2 Tennen both run on the MediaTek Helio A22 System-on-Chip paired with 2 GB of RAM. Both phones are 9.1 mm thick and have a 5.45-inch HD+ IPS LCD with thick bezels and a chin at the bottom.

The Nokia C2 Tava and Nokia C2 Tennen differ only in the colour of the device; the Tava is sold exclusively in Tempered Blue, while the Tennen is sold in Steel colour.

== Nokia C5 Endi ==
Nokia C5 Endi
- Brand: Nokia
- Developer: HMD Global
- Manufacturer: Foxconn
- Type: Smartphone
- Related: Nokia 5.1 Plus
- Dimensions: H: 171.7 mm (6.76 in); W: 76.7 mm (3.02 in); D: 8.9 mm (0.35 in)
- Weight: 200 g (7.1 oz)
- Operating system: Original: Android 10
- System-on-chip: MediaTek Helio P22 (12 nm)
- CPU: Octa-core 2.0 GHz Cortex-A53
- GPU: PowerVR GE8320
- Memory: 3 GB LPDDR3 RAM
- Storage: 64 GB
- Removable storage: microSD, up to 128 GB
- Battery: 4000 mAh Li-Po, non-removable
- Rear camera: Triple Camera Set-up: 13 MP, PDAF (Wide); 5 MP (Ultrawide); 2 MP (Depth); LED flash, HDR, panorama Video: 1080p@30fps
- Front camera: 8 MP (Wide); Video: 1080p@30fps
- Display: 6.52 in (16.6 cm) (102.6 cm^{2}) 720p IPS LCD, ~269 ppi pixel density
- Connectivity: 3.5 mm TRRS headphone jack; Bluetooth 5.0; USB 2.0 via USB-C port
- Data inputs: Sensors: Fingerprint scanner (rear-mounted); Accelerometer; Proximity sensor; Electronic compass
- Website: www.hmd.com/en_us/nokia-c-5-endi

The Nokia C5 Endi is an Android-powered Nokia-branded smartphone released by HMD Global. It was announced on May 29, 2020, alongside the Nokia C2 Tava and Nokia C2 Tennen, and launched on June 5, 2020. The device was made exclusively for sale under agreement with Cricket Wireless.

=== Specifications ===
==== Software ====
The Nokia C5 Endi was originally released with Android 10.

==== Hardware ====
The Nokia C5 Endi runs on a MediaTek Helio P22 System-on-Chip paired with 3 GB of RAM. It is 8.9 mm thick. The device has a 6.52-inch HD+ IPS LCD. It has a "waterdrop notch" and a chin at the bottom with the Nokia logo.
