= Nokia 4.2 =

2019 Android smartphone model

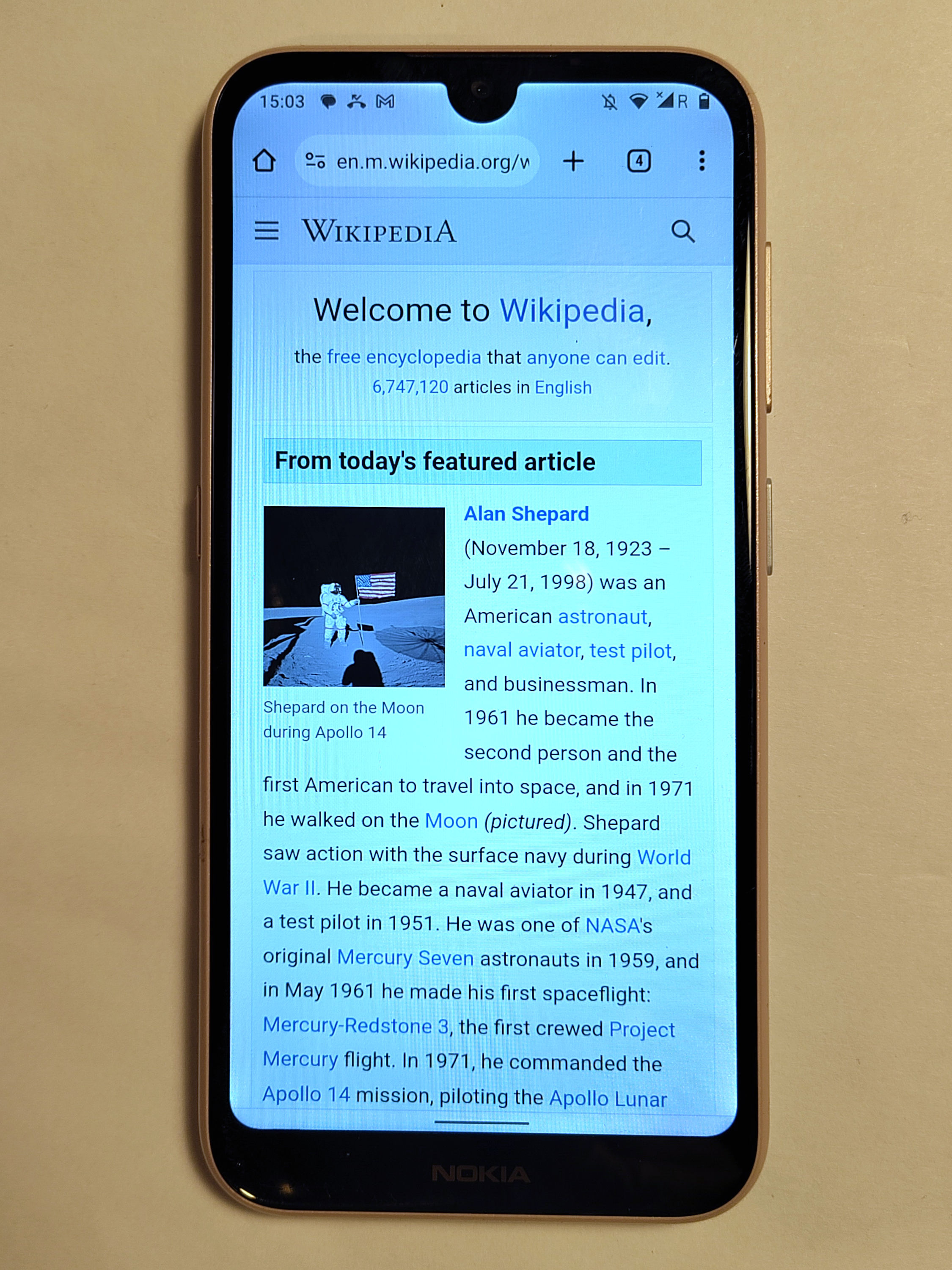
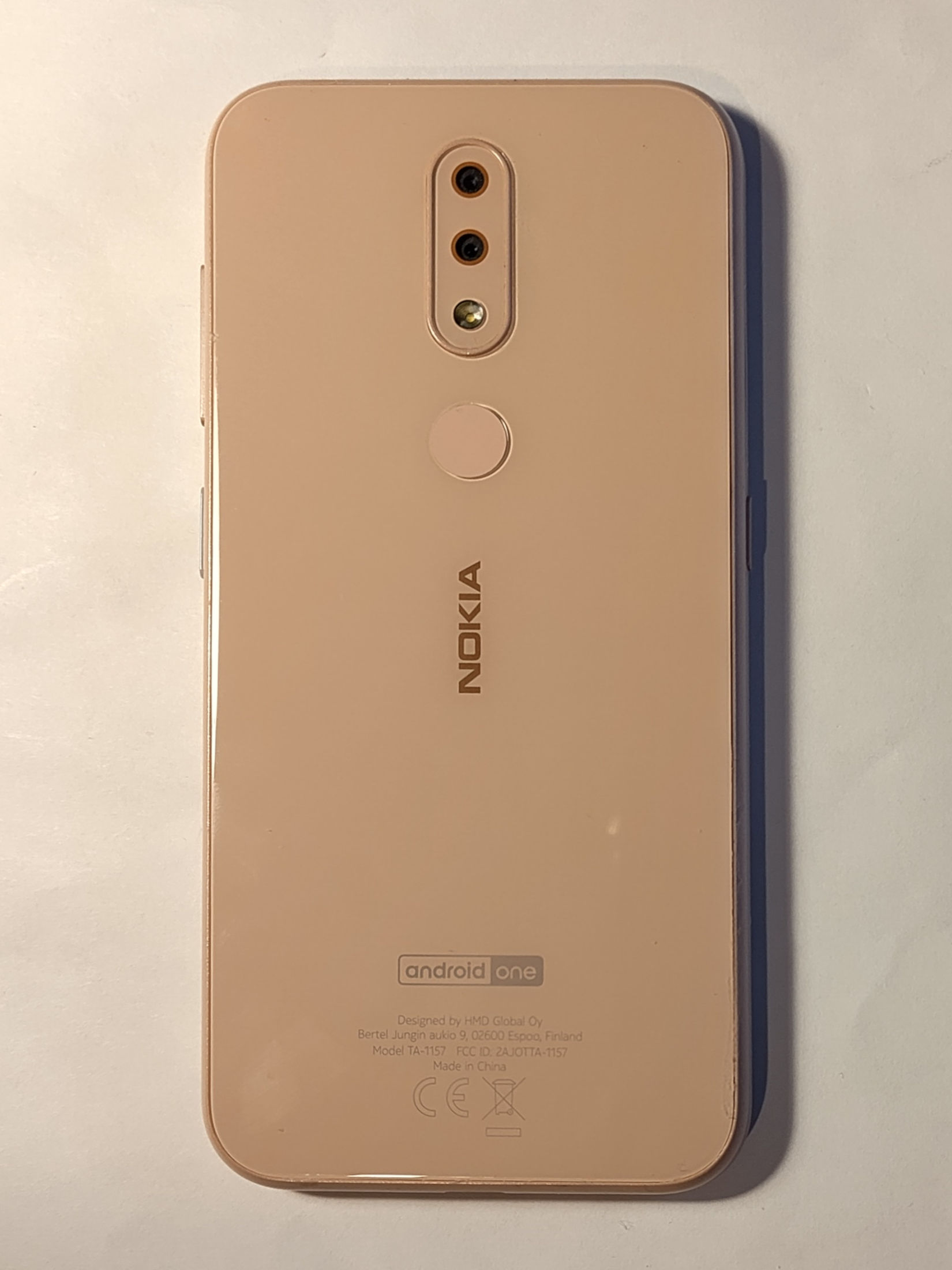
- front side back side
- Brand: Nokia
- Developer: HMD Global
- Manufacturer: Foxconn
- Type: Smartphone
- Family: Single digit Series
- First released: 14 May 2019
- Related: Nokia 2.2; Nokia 5.1 Plus; Nokia 6.2; Nokia 7.2; Nokia 9 PureView
- Dimensions: 149 mm (5.9 in) H 71.3 mm (2.81 in) W 8.4 mm (0.33 in) D
- Weight: 161 g (6 oz)
- Operating system: Android 9 "Pie" (Android One), currently Android 11
- System-on-chip: Qualcomm Snapdragon 439 (12 nm)
- CPU: Octa-Core (2x2.0 GHz Cortex-A53 & 6x1.45 GHz Cortex A53)
- GPU: Adreno 505
- Memory: 2/3 GB RAM
- Storage: 16/32 GB
- Removable storage: microSDXC, expandable up to 400 GB
- Battery: 3,000 mAh Non-removable, Li-ion
- Rear camera: 13 MP + 2 MP
- Front camera: 8 MP
- Display: 5.71 in (14.5 cm) diagonal (81.4cm²) IPS LCD, 720 x 1520 px 19:9 aspect ratio 295 ppi
- Sound: 3.5 mm jack, Single speaker
- Connectivity: Micro USB (USB 2.0), USB OTG, Wi-Fi, Bluetooth, GPS
- Data inputs: Multi-touch screen Accelerometer; Ambient light sensor Proximity sensor Fingerprint (rear-mounted)
- Website: www.hmd.com/en_int/nokia-4-2

The Nokia 4.2 is a Nokia-branded entry-level smartphone developed by HMD Global, running the Android operating system, which was released on 14 May 2019.

== Overview ==
It features 5.71-inch 19:9 720×1520 pixels IPS LCD, an octa-core Qualcomm Snapdragon 439 (12 nm) chipset, a dual-camera 13 MP + 2 MP setup on the back along with wide-angle 8 MP front camera. The camera of the Nokia 4.2 uses phase detection auto-focus. It comes with a non-removable 3,000 mAh battery.

The Nokia 4.2 has a large screen and thin bezels with a dewdrop notch. The phone has a chin on the bottom with the Nokia logo.

=== RAM/Storage ===
The phone comes with two types of models:

1. 2 GB RAM variant with 16 GB e-MMC 5.1 secondary memory.
2. 3 GB RAM variant with 32 GB e-MMC 5.1 secondary memory.

The phone supports up to 400 GB external memory card.

=== Sensors and inputs ===
It has a Micro USB (USB 2.0) port, Ambient light sensor, proximity sensor, accelerometer and rear-mounted fingerprint sensor.

=== Software ===
The Nokia 4.2 runs on Android 9.0 "Pie". As with all other Nokia phone models, the Nokia 4.2 is part of the Android One program.

== Reception ==
The Nokia 4.2 won a Good Design Award 2019.
