= Nokia 6.1 =

Nokia-branded mid-range Android smartphone

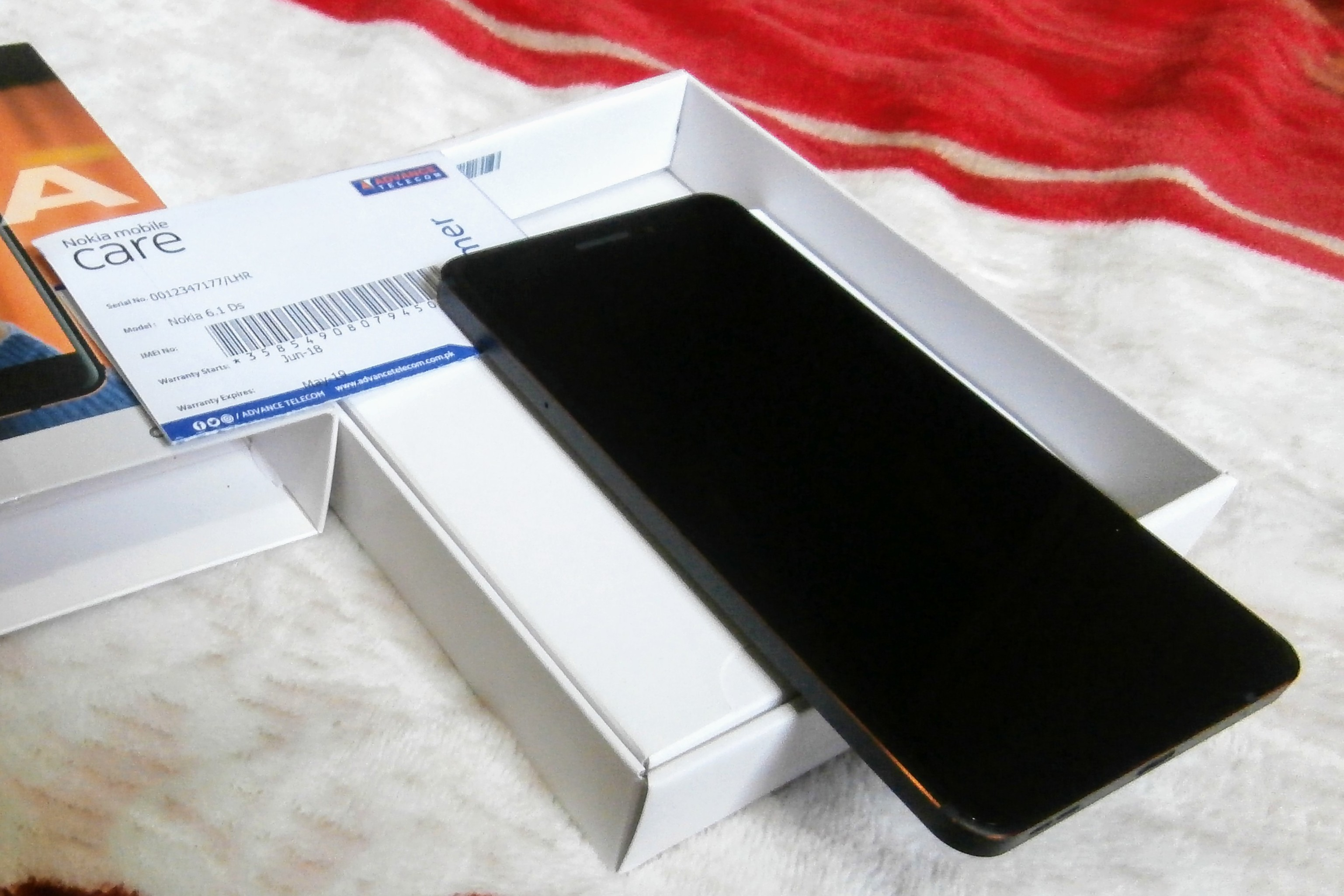
- Also known as: Nokia 6 (2018)
- Brand: Nokia
- Developer: HMD Global
- Manufacturer: Foxconn
- Type: Smartphone
- First released: 7 January 2018; 8 years ago
- Discontinued: 2 August 2019; 6 years ago
- Predecessor: Nokia 6
- Successor: Nokia 6.1 Plus (X6); Nokia 7.1
- Related: Nokia 1 Plus; Nokia 2.1; Nokia 3.1; Nokia 5.1; Nokia 7 Plus; Nokia 8 Sirocco; Nokia 8.1
- Dimensions: H: 148.8 mm (5.86 in); W: 75.8 mm (2.98 in); D: 8.2 mm (0.32 in)
- Weight: 172 g (6.1 oz)
- Operating system: Original: Android 8.1 "Oreo"; Current: Android 10 (Android One)
- System-on-chip: Qualcomm Snapdragon 630 (14 nm)
- CPU: Octa-core 2.2 GHz Cortex-A53
- GPU: Adreno 508
- Memory: 3 or 4 GB LPDDR4 RAM
- Storage: 32 or 64 GB
- Removable storage: microSD, up to 128 GB
- Battery: 3000 mAh Li-ion, non-removable
- Rear camera: 16 MP, f/2.0, 27mm (wide), PDAF, ZEISS optics, dual-LED dual-tone flash, Panorama, HDR; Video: 4K@30fps, 1080p@30fps
- Front camera: 8 MP, f/2.0, 1/4.0"; Video: 1080p@30fps
- Display: 5.5 in (14 cm) (82.6 cm^{2}) 1080p IPS LCD with Gorilla Glass 3 protection, ~403 ppi pixel density
- Connectivity: 3.5 mm TRRS headphone jack; Bluetooth 5.0; USB 2.0 via USB-C port; • NFC
- Data inputs: Sensors: Accelerometer; Electronic compass; Fingerprint scanner (rear-mounted); Gyroscope; Proximity sensor
- Website: www.hmd.com/en_int/nokia-6-1

The Nokia 6.1, also known as the Nokia 6 (2018) and the second-generation Nokia 6, is a Nokia-branded mid-range smartphone running the Android operating system. It was launched on 25 February 2018 in China as the successor to the first-generation Nokia 6.

== Specifications ==
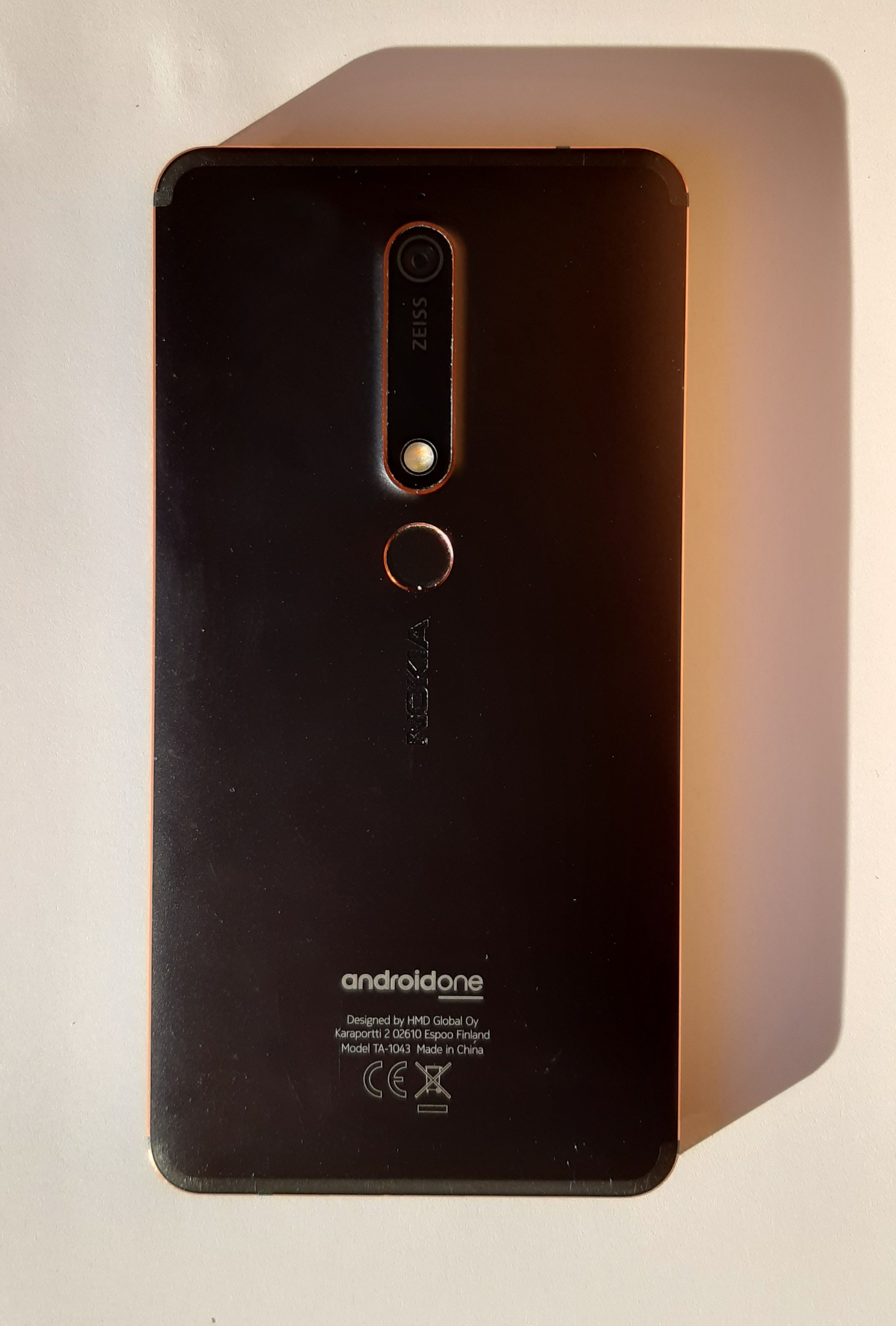
Backside view of used Nokia 6.1

=== Hardware ===
The second-generation Nokia 6 is powered by the Snapdragon 630 microprocessor, an upgrade from the Snapdragon 430 present in its predecessor. Depending on the version, it either comes with 32 GB storage and 3 GB of LPDDR4 RAM or 64 GB storage and 4 GB of RAM.

The display panel is the same 5.5" 1080p IPS LCD as the original, although the front bezels have been slimmed down and the capacitive navigation buttons and home button have been replaced with on-screen keys.

The camera setup is also the same combination of 16 MP rear and 8 MP selfie found in its predecessor, and retains the "Bothie" feature, which uses both cameras and splits the screen in half to capture an image or does picture in picture mode, showing the inwards camera in a small rectangle on top of the outwards camera, or vice versa.

One of the main changes is the replacement of the micro-USB port in favor of the reversible USB-C, as well as the shift of the fingerprint sensor to the rear of the device. It keeps the 3.5 mm headphone jack. The Nokia 6.1 also supports Nokia OZO audio.

Nokia 6.1 (codename PL2) models
Model	Countries	SIM	Storage (GB)	RAM (GB)
TA-1043	International	Dual	32	3
TA-1045	International	Dual	32	3
TA-1089	International	Dual	32	3
TA-1068	Europe	Dual	64	4
TA-1016	North America	Single	32	3
TA-1050	Australia, England, New Zealand	Single	32	3
TA-1054	China, Hong Kong, Taiwan	Dual	64	4

=== Software ===
The phone was launched in China running Android 7.1.1 Nougat and was upgradable to Android 8.0 Oreo, Android 9 Pie followed by Android 10. All other versions, including the international one, which launched later, ship with Android 8.1 Oreo, upgradeable to Android 9 Pie since the end of October 2018 and Android 10 since 10 January 2020. It is part of the Android One program, which means the device gets 2 years of Android OS updates and 3 years of security updates and is therefore upgradeable up to Android 10.

== Reception ==
The Nokia 6.1 mostly received positive reviews. Holly Brockwell of TechRadar praised the phone's software, design and screen while criticising the battery, camera and audio.
