= Nokia Lumia 1020 =

Smartphone by Nokia

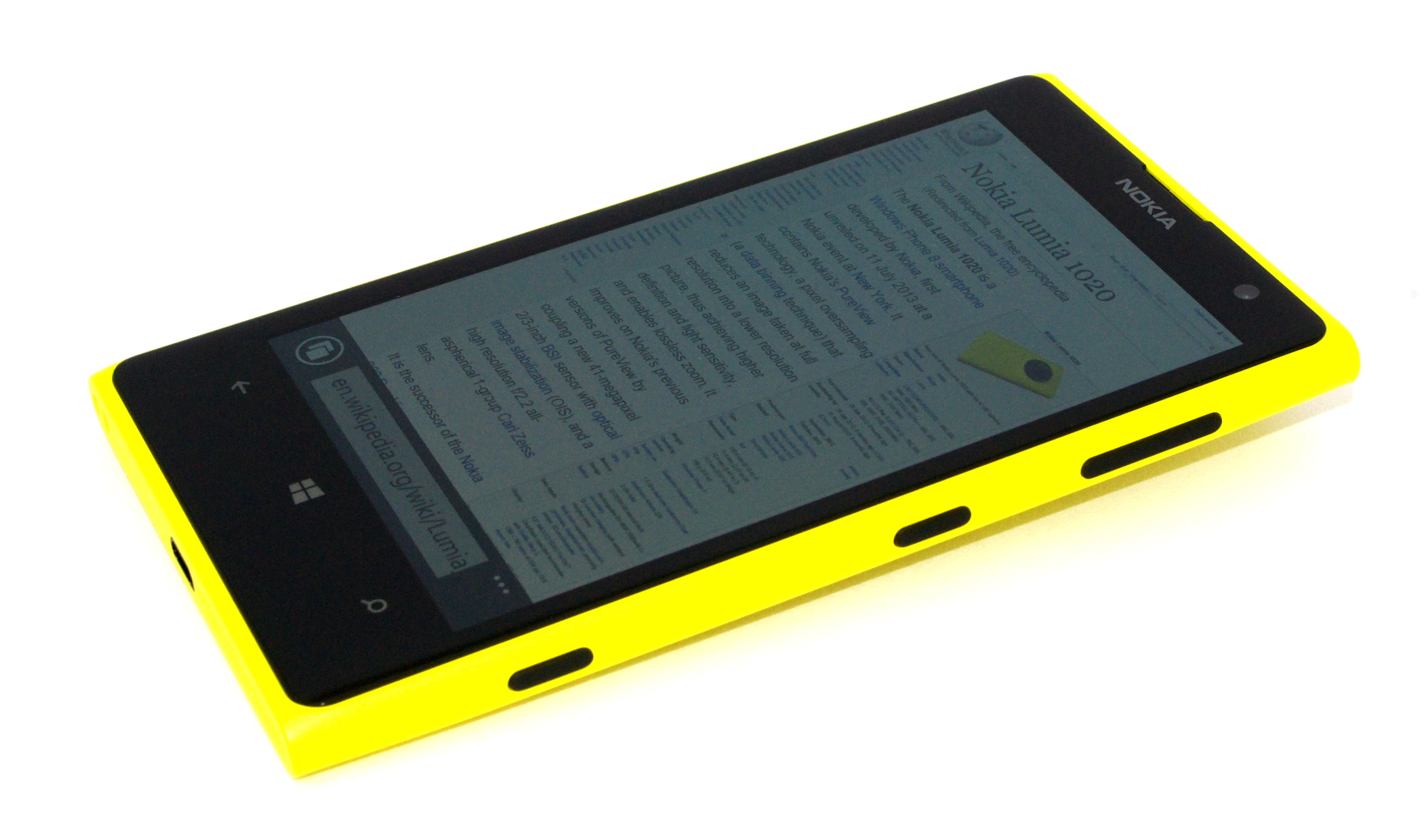
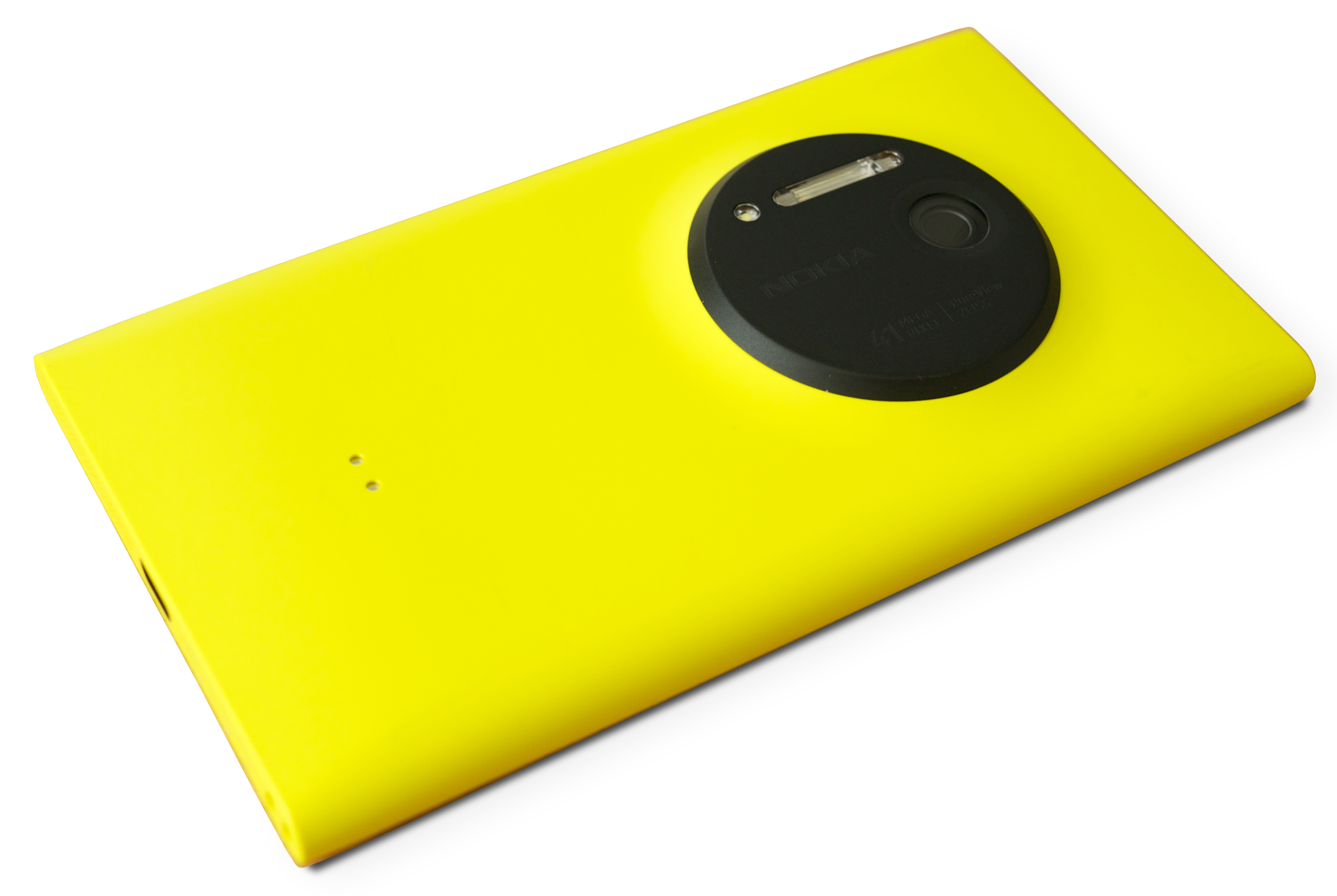
- Front and rear sides of Nokia Lumia 1020, with the 41 MP camera
- Brand: Nokia
- Manufacturer: Nokia
- Type: Smartphone
- Series: Lumia
- First released: 26 July 2013; 13 years ago
- Availability by region: 26 July 2013; 13 years ago (United States); 15 August 2013; 13 years ago (China); September 2013: 10 September 2013; 13 years ago (Italy); 17 September 2013; 13 years ago (Australia); 19 September 2013; 13 years ago (Poland); 25 September 2013; 13 years ago (UK); 26 September 2013; 13 years ago (New Zealand); September 2013 (Belgium); September 2013 (Germany); October 2013: 2 October 2013; 13 years ago (France); 3 October 2013; 13 years ago (Canada); 10 October 2013; 13 years ago (Denmark); 10 October 2013; 13 years ago (Norway); 11 October 2013; 13 years ago (India); 11 October 2013; 13 years ago (Russia); 11 October 2013; 13 years ago (Philippines); 17 October 2013; 13 years ago (Sweden)
- Discontinued: 2015
- Predecessor: Nokia 808 PureView
- Successor: Microsoft Lumia 950 XL; Nokia 8 Sirocco; Nokia 9 PureView
- Related: Nokia Lumia 920; Nokia Lumia 925; Nokia Lumia 928
- Compatible networks: 2.5G GSM/GPRS/EDGE – 850, 900, 1800, 1900 MHz; 3G UMTS/DC-HSPA+ – 850, 900, 1900, 2100 MHz; 4G LTE Rel. 8 (UE Cat 3) – 700, 800, 900, 1800, 2100, 2600 MHz
- Form factor: Bar
- Dimensions: 130.4 mm (5.13 in) H 71.4 mm (2.81 in) W 10.4 mm (0.41 in) D 14.5 mm (0.57 in) Bulge
- Weight: 158 g (5.6 oz)
- Operating system: Windows Phone 8, upgradeable to 8.1
- System-on-chip: Qualcomm Snapdragon S4
- CPU: 1.5 GHz dual-core Qualcomm Krait
- GPU: Qualcomm Adreno 225
- Memory: 2 GB RAM
- Storage: 32 GB / 64 GB internal flash
- Battery: Rechargeable BV-4NW 2000mAh Li-ion battery, Qi inductive charging (with wireless charging cover)
- Rear camera: 41 MP (1/1.5" i.e. 2/3") BSI sensor w/ Carl Zeiss optics, f/2.2, autofocus, Optical image stabilization; Xenon flash, LED video light; RAW Image Capture (Adobe DNG); 1080p video capture @ 30 fps
- Front camera: 1.2 MP, 1280×960 px, 720p video capture @ 30 fps
- Display: 4.5" AMOLED RGBG PenTile ClearBlack capacitive touchscreen with Gorilla Glass 3, 1280 × 768 pixels at 334 ppi, 15:9 aspect ratio
- Connectivity: List: Wi-Fi: 802.11 a/b/g/n; Bluetooth 4.0; NFC Micro-USB 2.0; Wi-Fi positioning system (WPS); GPS, SA-GPS, GLONASS
- Data inputs: Multi-touch capacitive touchscreen; gyroscope; magnetometer; proximity sensor; 3D-accelerometer
- Other: Talk time 2G: 19.1 hours 3G: 13.3 hours Standby 606 hours (about 25.2 days)
- Website: US: Nokia Lumia 1020; UK: Nokia Lumia 1020

The Nokia Lumia 1020 (known as Lumia 909 during development) is a smartphone developed by Nokia, first unveiled on 11 July 2013 at a Nokia event in New York. It runs Windows Phone 8, but is also Windows Phone 8.1 ready. It contains Nokia's PureView technology, a pixel oversampling technique that reduces an image taken at full resolution into a lower resolution picture, thus achieving higher definition and light sensitivity, and enables lossless digital zoom. It improves on its predecessor, the Nokia 808, by coupling a 41-megapixel 2/3-inch BSI sensor with optical image stabilization (OIS) and a high resolution f/2.2 all-aspherical 1-group Carl Zeiss lens. It was considered to be the most advanced cameraphone when released in September 2013.

In January 2014, Nokia released the "Lumia Black" firmware update for the Lumia 1020, adding various new features, including improved image processing in addition to capturing RAW (DNG) files. The Lumia 1020 also received the Lumia Denim software update, but without new features or updates to the system firmware, due to the phone's age. It is not officially eligible for upgrading to Windows 10 Mobile, but Windows 10 Mobile Beta is available for Lumia 1020.

A prototype codenamed McLaren (previously leaked as Goldfinger) was planned to be the successor to the 1020, but was cancelled before official launch.

== PureView Pro camera ==
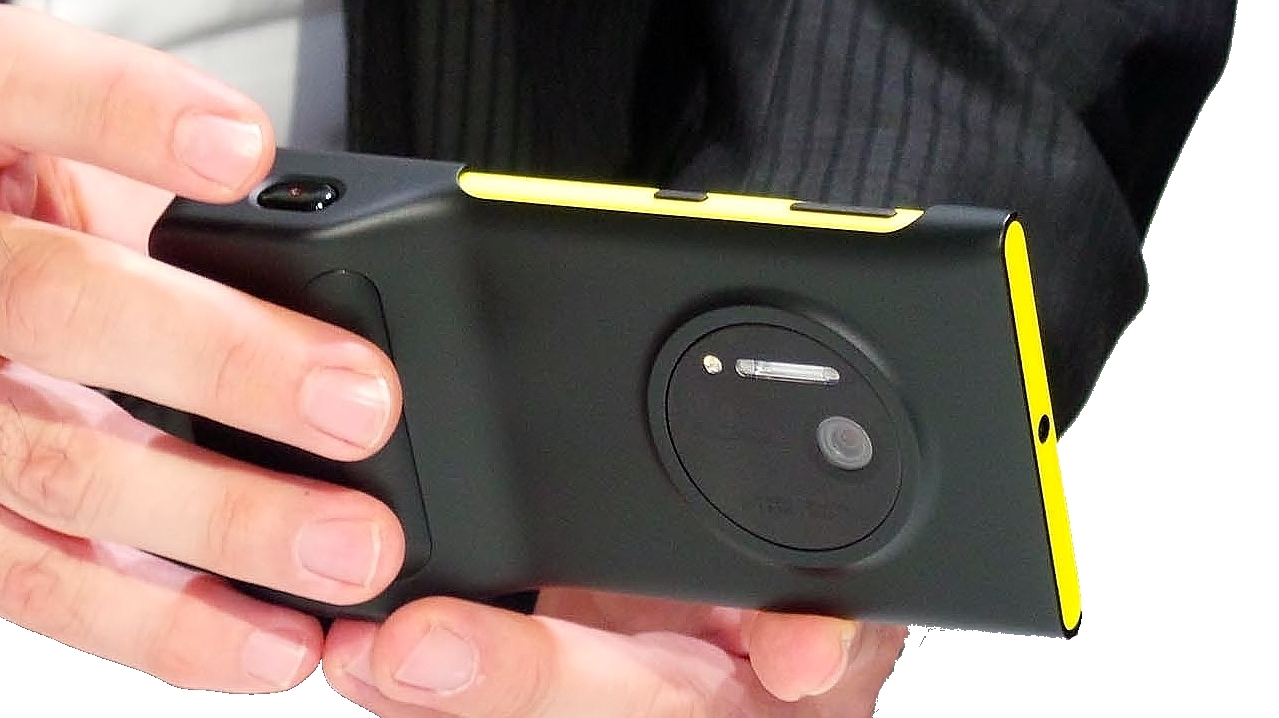
Nokia Lumia 1020 equipped with the optional PD-95G camera grip

PureView Pro is an imaging technology used in the Nokia 1020 device. It is the combination of a 1/1.5" large, high-resolution 41 MP image sensor with high performance Carl Zeiss optics. The large sensor enables pixel oversampling, which means the combination of many sensor pixels into one image pixel. PureView imaging technology delivers high image quality, lossless zoom, and improved low light performance (see below). It dispenses with the usual scaling/interpolation model of digital zoom used in virtually all smartphones. In both video and stills, this technique provides greater zoom levels as the output picture size reduces, enabling 4× lossless zoom in 1080p video and 6× lossless zoom for 720p video. Optical image stabilization is also present to nullify shaking of hands when taking a photo and to allow significantly more light to enter the sensor for better low light photos. It also has an adjustable shutter speed of up to 1/16,000 s.

Some reviewers have noted the camera may exhibit lens flare and minor white balance issues under particular circumstances.

The camera needs 6.1 seconds to start up and 3.6 seconds between photo shots for 5 MP photos and 4.2 seconds for 38 MP photos.

Like the Nokia 808 (and the N8 and N82 before them), the Nokia Lumia 1020 has a Xenon flash.

=== PureView Pro specifications ===
Sensor

The Nokia Lumia 1020 has a 41.3-megapixel BSI CMOS image sensor, 1/1.5-inch (2/3-inch) image sensor format with a total of 7712 × 5360 pixels. Maximum image size at a 4:3 aspect ratio is 7136 × 5360 pixels (38.2 MP); maximum image size at a 16:9 aspect ratio is 7712 × 4352 pixels (33.6 MP). Pixel size is 1.12 μm. Sensor size is 8.80×6.60 mm. Crop factor 3.93×.35 mm equivalent focal length: 25 mm for 16:9, 27 mm for 4:3. f/2.2

Compare

The Nokia 808 has a 41.5-megapixel FSI CMOS image sensor, 1/1.2-inch image sensor format with an active area of 7728 × 5368 pixels, totalling over 41 MP. Depending on the aspect ratio chosen by the user, it will use 7728 × 4354 pixels (33.6 MP) for 16:9 images, or 7152 × 5368 pixels (38.2 MP) for 4:3 images with the default camera app. Pixel size is 1.4 μm. Sensor size is 10.67 × 8.00 mm. Crop factor 3.2×.35 mm equivalent focal length: 26 mm, 16:9 | 28 mm, 4:3. f/2.4

Lens

Carl Zeiss optics with f/2.2 focal ratio. Focal length: 7.2 mm: 35 mm equivalent focal length: 25 mm @ 16:9 aspect ratio, and 27 mm @ 4:3 aspect ratio. Construction: Six elements in one group. All lens surfaces are aspherical, partly extreme aspheric, one high refractive index, low-dispersion glass mould lens.

Optical image stabilisation — includes new type of barrel shift actuator, which enables moving a heavy and complex full-lens assembly.

Shutter

Mechanical shutter with short shutter lag.

Microphones

Lumia 1020 has high quality microphones for stereo recording of video's audio. Like in Nokia 808, Rich Recording technology (aka High Amplitude Audio Capture (HAAC)) is used that can capture sounds at the loudness level of up to 140 decibels without distortion.

Processing

On-chip image processor performing image scaling with oversampling, giving lossless zoom: 4× for full-HD 1080p video with on-chip video processor performing image resolution processing with over 1 billion pixels per second, enabling the use of all pixels for improved image noise and dynamic range.

== Nokia Pro Camera software ==
The Lumia 1020 ships with Nokia's new Pro Camera application, allowing a greater degree of control over the camera settings than the standard Windows Phone in-built camera and can be set as the default imaging application when launched with the camera button. Providing "swipe-able" dials in a concentric ring display, settings such as exposure level, white balance, shutter speed and film ISO can be adjusted "on the fly" to enable changes to be visualised before a shot is taken. Nokia hope to bring professional camera settings, once the preserve of experts, to the masses and encourage experimentation and learning using built-in tutorials.

For video recording in addition to automatic control, manual focus and white balance controls are provided. Frame rate can be selected to be 24, 25 or 30 frames per second for both 720p and 1080p resolutions. For video's audio recording the HAAC high pass filter corner frequency can be selected to be 200 Hz, 100 Hz or none (0 Hz) in the settings. Selecting 200 Hz makes possible undistorted recording even in very loud surroundings having high bass audio levels.

== Model variants ==
Model	RM-875	RM-876	RM-877
Countries	International	TBA	United States, Canada
Carriers/Providers	International	TBA	AT&T, Rogers Wireless
2G	Quad-band GSM/EDGE (850/900/1800/1900 MHz)		
3G	Quad-band HSPA+ 1, 2, 5/6, 8 (850/900/1900/2100 MHz)	Pentaband HSPA+ 1, 2, 4, 5/6, 8 (850/900/AWS/1900/2100 MHz)	AT&T: Quad-band HSPA+ 1, 2, 5/6, 8 (850/900/1900/2100 MHz); Rogers: Pentaband HSPA+ 1, 2, 4, 5/6, 8 (850/900/AWS/1900/2100 MHz)
4G	Pentaband LTE 1, 3, 7, 8, 20 (2100/1800/2600/900/800 MHz)	No	Quad-band LTE 2, 4, 5, 17 (700/850/1700/1900 MHz)
Max network speed down/upload	LTE: 100/50 Mbit/s; DC-HSPA+: 42.2/5.76 Mbit/s	HSPA+: 21/5.76 Mbit/s	LTE: 100/50 Mbit/s; DC-HSPA+: 42.2/5.76 Mbit/s

== Reception ==
Front of a Lumia 1020, with vector-drawn Windows Phone tiles on the screen

Reception was mainly positive, but some reviewers noted that the market for the Lumia 1020 is limited.

Kamalahasan from KnowYourGadget stated: "Nokia Lumia 1020 is a great improvement over the Nokia 808. The camera is just superb and one of the best we have seen on a mobile device. If you need a simple smartphone and your phone doubles as your point and shoot, this is the device for you.

Brian Klug from Anandtech stated: "I think it's fair to say that once again Nokia has basically set the bar for the rest of the smartphone imaging world – in terms of both hardware and software features."

Chris Finnamore from Expert Reviews wrote: "Simply stunning photos make the Lumia 1020 the ultimate cameraphone." He gave it five stars and awarded it the Expert Reviews: Ultimate award, which places it among other high-end flagships such as the Galaxy S4 and the iPhone 5S, which also received the award.

Erin Lodi of Digital Photography Review wrote: "Despite the lower lighting level, the Nokia is able to out-perform its rivals by a healthy margin. Fine detail is better maintained and the image is generally "cleaner." This benefit (that comes from a combination of a larger sensor and the noise-reducing effect of downscaling images), is one of the significant advantages of Nokia's decision to use a large sensor in a smartphone. Whether you look at the resolution stripe on the left of the image or the etched portrait on the right, the 1020 is significantly out-performing its rivals."

David Pierce from The Verge said that this is a remarkable phone, hampered by its operating system.

Dan Nosowitz from Popular Science wrote: "Nokia's new Lumia smartphone has amazing hardware (especially its unprecedented 41-megapixel camera). And it doesn't matter at all, because its software lags so far behind its hardware."

Charles Arthur from The Guardian wrote: "The Finnish phone maker released its remarkable Lumia 1020 phone with a 41-megapixel camera – but it's still missing native apps for low-quality Instagram, Vine and Snapchat"

Jim Fisher and Sascha Segan from PC Magazine wrote: "The Lumia 1020 is a big step forward for camera phones, but the step isn't complete. Nokia's sensor and lens advances must be paired with a CPU and image processor fast enough to make shooting effortless, and Windows Phone's creative app gaps need to be filled in."

G van Veldhoven from Gadgetmania wrote: "If you absolutely need the best camera on a smartphone and don't mind Windows Phone 8 and spending a good chunk of money upfront, the Lumia 1020 is worth looking at, but I don't expect it to be very popular."

Devindra Hardawar of VentureBeat called the Lumia 1020 "the best smartphone camera ever", but noted that the phone was "clearly being held back" by the Windows Phone operating system.

Sales were slower than the Lumia 920 and the previous Lumia 900, but slightly better than the Lumia 928.

== Reported problems ==
Some Lumia 1020 users have reported instances of rapid battery drain and overheating, random reboots or freezes, poor voice call quality or Wi-Fi drop outs.

The Windows Phone 8.1 update introduced an issue for some Lumia 1020 and 925 users where their phones would freeze randomly on a regular basis. Microsoft has been working on the issue since September 2014.

== In popular culture ==
The Lumia 1020 has been featured in several music videos and television shows, including:

- "Roar" by Katy Perry
- "I Can't Make You Love Me" by Priyanka Chopra
- "How Long Will I Love You" by Ellie Goulding, with the video itself also shot on a Lumia 1020
- Parks and Recreation

== See also ==
- Microsoft Lumia

== Apps ==
- Windows Phone App for view and edit Pureview (dng) files
