= Nokia 6.1 Plus =

Nokia branded smartphone running Android operating system

Nokia 6.1 Plus / X6
- Brand: Nokia
- Developer: HMD Global
- Manufacturer: Foxconn
- Series: Nokia 6
- First released: 30 August 2018; 7 years ago
- Availability by region: 30 August 2018 (India) (Flipkart)
- Units sold: more than 30,000 units at first sale
- Predecessor: Nokia 6
- Successor: Nokia 6.2
- Related: Nokia 5.1; Nokia 5.1 Plus; Nokia 6.1; Nokia 7.1
- Dimensions: 147.2 mm (5.80 in) H 71 mm (2.8 in) W 8 mm (0.31 in) D
- Weight: 151 g (5.3 oz)
- Operating system: Original: Android 8.1 "Oreo"; Current: Android 10 (Android One)
- System-on-chip: Qualcomm Snapdragon 636 (14 nm)
- CPU: Octa-core (4x1.8 GHz Kryo 260 Gold & 4x1.6 GHz Kryo 260 Silver)
- GPU: Adreno 509
- Memory: 4 or 6 GB LPDDR4 RAM
- Storage: 32 or 64 GB
- Removable storage: microSD, up to 400 GB
- Battery: 3060 mAh Li-ion, non-removable
- Rear camera: 16+5 MP dual camera
- Front camera: 16 MP
- Display: 5.8 inches, 1080x2280p IPS LCD
- Model: TA-1083 DS
- Website: https://www.hmd.com/en_int/nokia-6-plus

The Nokia 6.1 Plus, also known as the Nokia X6 (not to be confused with the 2009 Nokia X6), is a Nokia-branded mid-range smartphone running the Android operating system.

== Nokia 6.1 Plus / X6 Models ==
Model	Notes	SIM	Storage (GB)	RAM (GB)	Reference
TA-1083	Global variant	Dual	64	4	
TA-1103	Global variant	Dual	64	4	
TA-1116	Global variant	Dual	64	4	
TA-1099	Chinese X6 model	Dual	32 / 64	3 / 4 / 6	
