= Nokia 7 Plus =

Nokia-branded upper midrange smartphone

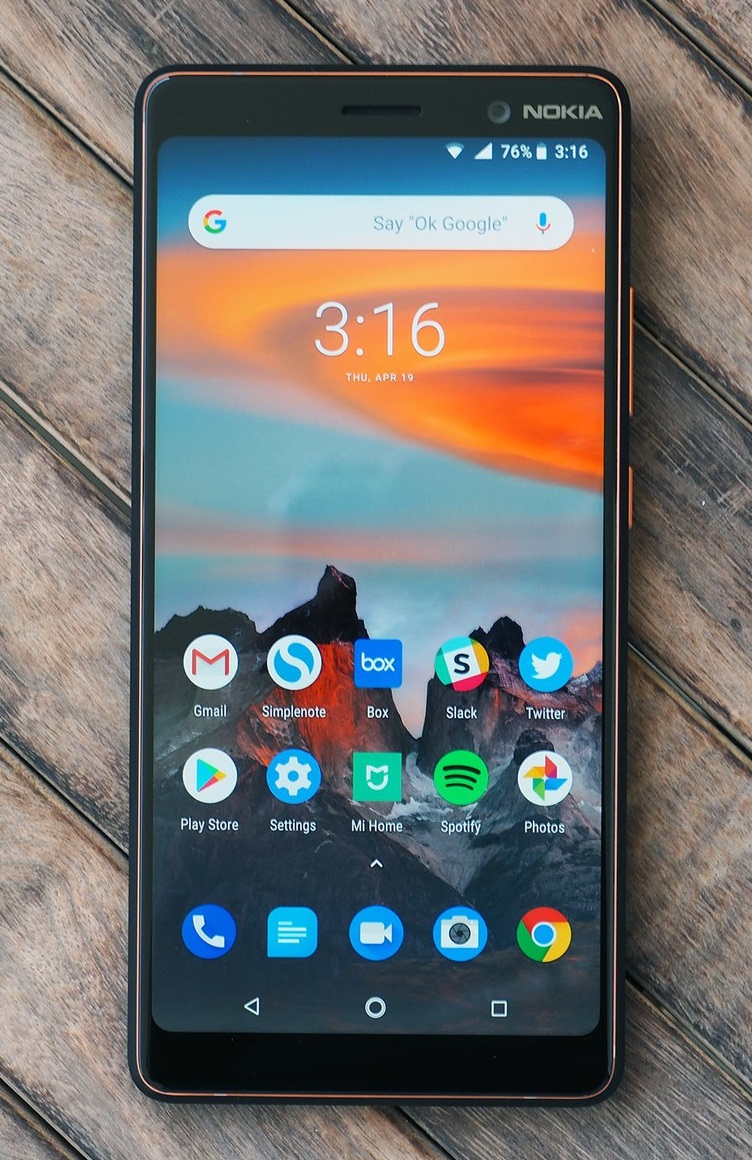
- Nokia 7 Plus
- Brand: Nokia
- Developer: HMD Global
- Manufacturer: Foxconn
- Type: Smartphone
- First released: 2018 March
- Discontinued: December 10, 2020; 5 years ago
- Successor: Nokia 7.1; Nokia 8.1
- Related: Nokia 1 Plus; Nokia 2.1; Nokia 3.1; Nokia 5.1; Nokia 6.1; Nokia 8 Sirocco
- Dimensions: H: 158.4 mm (6.24 in); W: 75.6 mm (2.98 in); D: 8 mm (0.31 in)
- Weight: 183 g (6.5 oz)
- Operating system: Original: Android 8.1 "Oreo"; Current: Android 10 (Android One)
- System-on-chip: Qualcomm Snapdragon 660 (14 nm)
- CPU: Octa-core (4x2.2 GHz Kryo 260 Gold & 4x1.8 GHz Kryo 260 Silver)
- GPU: Adreno 512
- Memory: 4 or 6 GB LPDDR4 RAM (Note: 6 GB version only, as TA-1062 model, in JD.com, WeChat Mini Program and Nokia Mobile Official Mall, as China exclusive sales.)
- Storage: 64 GB
- Removable storage: microSD, up to 256 GB
- Battery: 3800 mAh Li-Po, non-removable
- Rear camera: Dual Camera Set-up: 12 MP (f/1.8, 25mm, 1/2.55", 1.4 μm, dual pixel PDAF) Wide; 13 MP (f/2.6, 1/3.4", 1.0 μm, autofocus, 2x optical zoom) Telephoto; ZEISS optics, dual-LED dual-tone flash, panorama, HDR; Video: 4K@30fps, 1080p@30fps (gyro-EIS)
- Front camera: 16 MP (f/2.0, 1/3.06", 1.0 μm), ZEISS optics Video: 1080p@30fps
- Display: 6.0 in (15 cm) (92.4 cm^{2}) 1080p IPS LCD with Gorilla Glass 3 protection, ~403 ppi pixel density
- Connectivity: 3.5 mm TRRS headphone jack; Bluetooth; USB 2.0 via USB-C port
- Data inputs: Sensors: Accelerometer; Electronic compass; Fingerprint scanner (rear-mounted); Gyroscope; Proximity sensor
- Model: TA-1046 (International); TA-1055 (India); TA-1062 (Asia, Oceania and SEA); TA-1051, TA-1072 (unknown)
- Codename: N7P
- Website: www.hmd.com/en_int/nokia-7-plus

The Nokia 7 Plus is a Nokia-branded upper-mid-range smartphone running the Android operating system. It was announced on 25 February 2018, along with four other Nokia-branded phones.

== Specifications ==
=== Software ===
As the Nokia 7 Plus is an Android One device, it runs a near-stock version of the Android operating system. It was originally shipped with Android 8.0 Oreo; however, an update to Android 8.1 Oreo was released soon after for the device.

On 8 May 2018, it was announced that the Nokia 7 Plus would be one of seven non-Google smartphones to receive the Android Pie beta. On 28 September 2018, the Android Pie update started to roll out to the Nokia 7 Plus in phases, starting in India, and on 30 November 2018 in China.

On 7 January 2020, Android 10 started being rolled out on the Nokia 7 Plus.

=== Hardware ===
The Nokia 7 Plus has a 6 inch (152mm) LTPS IPS LCD, Octa-core (4x2.2 GHz Kryo 260 & 4x1.8 GHz Kryo 260) Qualcomm Snapdragon 660 processor, 4 GB of RAM and 64 GB of internal storage that can be expanded using microSD cards up to 256 GB. The phone has a 3800 mAh Li-ion battery, 13 MP rear camera with LED flash and 16 MP front-facing camera with auto-focus. It is available in Tempered Black/Copper, White/Copper colors. The phone is designed from a single block of 6000 series aluminium.

As with other mid-range and top-range phones from Nokia, the Nokia 7 Plus features exclusive rear camera optics licensed from ZEISS.

The NFC-area on the back of the phone is both smaller and weaker than comparable phones. The NFC area can be found to the left of the camera housing.

The development of Nokia 7 Plus began as early as 2017 and by 31 December of the same year it was ready for release.

== Reception ==
Reviews of the Nokia 7 Plus have been generally positive.

Critics have praised its large display, battery life, and Android One software. Its design and build quality have also been praised. One reviewer called it the most promising Nokia smartphone "in years".

Android Central praised its camera as being "one of the best" in its $400 price category, and added that the 7 Plus is "one of the best phones of the year". At the same time, the phone's slow camera processing speed was criticised.

== Controversies ==
In March 2019, a report by Norwegian state broadcaster NRK found that some Nokia 7 Plus phones sent sensitive unencrypted personal information (including location and serial number) to a domain name controlled by China Telecom, every time the device was booted, and multiple times thereafter. HMD responded to the allegations, stating that carrier activation software intended for a different market was accidentally included in a batch of the devices, but that only "activation data" that could not be used to identify a user was sent and not processed, and that this error was fixed by the February 2019 software patch. Finnish authorities are investigating this as a violation of the General Data Protection Regulation (GDPR).
