= Nokia 2.1 =

Nokia branded low-end smartphone

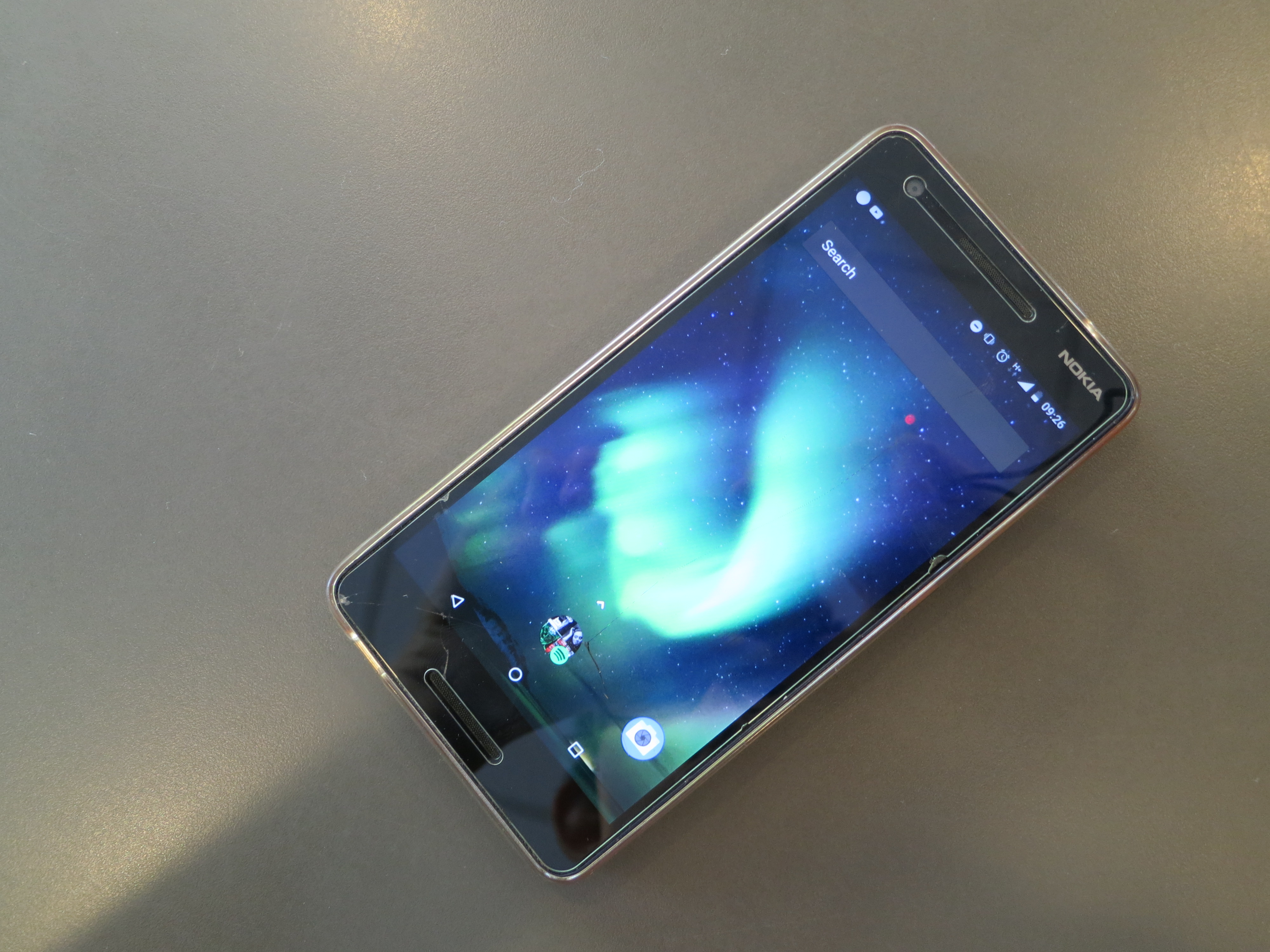
- Also known as: Nokia 2 (2018)
- Brand: Nokia
- Developer: HMD Global
- Manufacturer: Foxconn
- Type: Smartphone
- First released: August 2018; 7 years ago
- Predecessor: Nokia 2
- Successor: Nokia 2.2
- Related: Nokia 1 Plus; Nokia 3.1; Nokia 5.1; Nokia 6.1; Nokia 7 Plus; Nokia 8 Sirocco
- Dimensions: 153.6×77.6×9.7 mm (6.05×3.06×0.38 in)
- Weight: 174 g (6 oz)
- Operating system: Original: Android 8.1 "Oreo"; Current: Android 10 (Android Go)
- System-on-chip: Qualcomm Snapdragon 425 (28nm)
- CPU: Quad-core ARM Cortex-A53 @ 1.4 GHz
- GPU: Adreno 308
- Memory: 1 GB
- Storage: 8 GB
- Removable storage: microSD, up to 128 GB
- Battery: 4000 mAH Non-removable Li-ion, charges at 10W
- Rear camera: Single 8 MP with flash.
- Front camera: 5 MP
- Display: 5.5" (13.97cm) 16:9 720x1280p IPS LCD
- Sound: Stereo Speakers + 3.5mm Headphone Jack
- Connectivity: MicroUSB 2.0, 3.5mm Headphone Jack, MicroSD slot, Bluetooth 4.2, GPS, FM Radio & Wifi 802.11 b/g/n
- Website: www.hmd.com/en_int/nokia-2-1

Nokia 2.1 is a Nokia-branded entry-level smartphone released by HMD Global in August 2018, running the Android operating system.

== Design ==
The phone has an aluminium frame with a plastic back. It runs on a Qualcomm Snapdragon 425 System-on-chip with 1 GB of RAM. It has Dual Sim support.

== Reception ==
The Nokia 2.1 received mixed reviews. Andrew Williams of TrustedReviews praised the phone's "low price, large screen and stereo speakers" while criticising "poor storage and performance".
