= Trusted Reviews =

British technology news website

- Website type: Technology news Product reviews
- Founded: 2003; 23 years ago
- Owner: Trusted Reviews Limited
- Editor: Max Parker
- Website: www.trustedreviews.com
- Current status: active

Trusted Reviews is a web publication focused on technology, published in London, UK by Trusted Reviews Limited.

== History ==
Trusted Reviews was founded in 2003 by Hugh Chappell and Riyad Emeran as a response to the decline in sales of computer reviews magazines. Launched to provide a web only product for increasingly internet-literate users, access was deliberately made free to compete with paid-for magazine subscriptions. The website covers the consumer technology market, focusing on mobile phones, TV and audio visual equipment and computing.

In 2007, the-then IPC Media bought Trusted Reviews in order to expand its digital operations.

In 2010, Cliff Jones was appointed editor of Trusted Reviews.

In 2012, Evan Kypreos was appointed editor.

In 2018, Nick Merritt was appointed Editor-in-Chief.

Prior to Meredith purchasing Time Inc., Trusted Reviews was regularly featured as a contributor to Time Magazine.

In 2020, Future plc (owner of competitor TechRadar) acquired TI Media, the then-parent company of Trusted Reviews and then sold Trusted Reviews to Incisive Media.

As of 2023, Trusted Reviews is no longer owned by Incisive Media and is run independently as part of Trusted Reviews Limited.

In August 2023 they announced the acquisition of Wareable Media Group.
