= Nokia 8 Sirocco =

Nokia-branded high-end Android smartphone

- Brand: Nokia
- Developer: HMD Global
- Manufacturer: Foxconn
- Type: Smartphone
- First released: February 24, 2018; 8 years ago
- Predecessor: Nokia 8 Nokia Lumia 1020
- Successor: Nokia 9 PureView; Nokia 8.3 5G
- Related: Nokia 1 Plus; Nokia 2.1; Nokia 3.1; Nokia 5.1; Nokia 6.1; Nokia 7 Plus
- Dimensions: H: 140.9 mm (5.55 in); W: 73 mm (2.9 in); D: 7.5 mm (0.30 in)
- Weight: 177 g (6.2 oz)
- Operating system: Original: Android 8.0 "Oreo"; Current: Android 10 (Android One)
- System-on-chip: Qualcomm Snapdragon 835 (10 nm)
- CPU: Octa-core (4x2.5 GHz Kryo & 4x1.8 GHz Kryo)
- GPU: Adreno 540
- Memory: 6 GB LPDDR4X RAM
- Storage: 128 GB UFS 2.1
- Battery: 3260 mAh Li-Po, non-removable
- Charging: Qi wireless charging
- Rear camera: Dual Camera Set-up: 12 MP (f/1.8, 25mm, 1/2.55", 1.4 μm, dual pixel PDAF) Wide; 13 MP (f/2.6, 1/3.4", 1.0 μm, autofocus, 2x optical zoom) Telephoto; ZEISS optics, dual-LED dual-tone flash, panorama, HDR; Video: 4K@30fps, 1080p@30fps
- Front camera: 5 MP (f/2.0, 1/4.0", 1.4μm); Video: 1080p@30fps
- Display: 5.5 in (14 cm) (83.4 cm^{2}) 1440p QHD 3D curved pOLED with Gorilla Glass 5 protection, ~534 ppi pixel density
- Connectivity: LTE Cat12 600 Mbps DL / Cat13 150 Mbps UL; Bluetooth 5.0; USB 3.1 via USB-C port; NFC
- Data inputs: Sensors: Fingerprint scanner (rear-mounted); Accelerometer; Gyroscope; Proximity sensor; Electronic compass; Hall sensor; Barometer
- Model: TA-1005
- Other: IP67 dust and water resistance
- Website: www.hmd.com/en_int/nokia-8-sirocco

The Nokia 8 Sirocco (TA-1005) was a flagship smartphone by HMD Global, running the Android One variant of Android. It was introduced at MWC in February 2018, and named after the Nokia 8800 Sirocco.

== Specifications ==
=== Hardware ===
Compared to the original Nokia 8, the Sirocco edition uses a glass body with stainless steel instead of aluminium. It also has a new camera, a fingerprint sensor at the back instead of the front, 6 GB of RAM instead of 4 GB, omission of the CTIA headphone jack in favour of USB-C, a 5.5" pOLED screen rather than a 5.3" LCD, Qi wireless charging, and a larger battery capacity.

The display is curved, but the phone lacks palm rejection technology which is found in other curved smartphones.

=== Software ===
The Nokia 8 Sirocco ships with Android 8.0 Oreo and can be updated to Android 10.

== Reception ==
The Nokia 8 Sirocco received mixed to positive reviews.

Daniel Van Boom of CNET praised the device, stating that "The Nokia 8 Sirocco is fast, feels sturdy, has a long battery life and runs the sleek Android One operating system.", while noting that "It lacks any standout features to justify its premium pricing. The Nokia 8 Sirocco's camera isn't reliable enough, and its design, while improved over the regular Nokia 8, feels stout and a little outdated".

Sandra Vogel of ZDNet also praised the phone's "Solid steel frame, Android One ensuring 2 years of updates, 128GB of internal storage and IP67 rating for dust/water resistance" while criticising the "poor implementation of a curved screen and 16:9 ratio display".
