= Nokia 3.1 =

2018 Nokia-Branded Smartphone

- Also known as: Nokia 3 (2018)
- Brand: Nokia
- Developer: HMD Global
- Manufacturer: Foxconn
- Type: Smartphone
- First released: 25 May 2018; 8 years ago
- Predecessor: Nokia 3
- Successor: Nokia 3.2
- Related: Nokia 1 Plus; Nokia 2.1; Nokia 5.1; Nokia 6.1; Nokia 7 Plus; Sirocco
- Dimensions: 146.25 mm (5.758 in) H 68.65 mm (2.703 in) W 8.7 mm (0.34 in) D (with or without camera bump)
- Weight: 138.3 g (5 oz)
- Operating system: Original: Android 8.0 "Oreo"; Current: Android 10 (Android One)
- System-on-chip: MediaTek MT6750N
- CPU: Octa-Core 1.5 GHz
- GPU: Mali-T860 MP2
- Memory: 2/3 GB
- Storage: 16/32 GB
- Removable storage: microSDXC, expandable up to 128 GB
- SIM: Nano SIM
- Battery: 2,990 mAh Non-removable, Li-ion
- Rear camera: 13 MP AF, LED flash
- Front camera: 8 MP AF, FOV 84 degrees
- Display: 5.2 in (130 mm) diagonal IPS LCD, with scratch-resistant Corning Gorilla Glass; 1440x720 px 18:9 aspect ratio 310 ppi
- Sound: 3.5 mm jack single speaker
- Connectivity: Micro USB (USB 2.0), USB OTG, Wi-Fi, Bluetooth, GPS
- Data inputs: Multi-touch screen Accelerometer; Ambient light sensor Digital Compass; Gyroscope; Proximity sensor
- Website: www.hmd.com/en_int/nokia-3-1/specs?sku=11ES2B21A13

The Nokia 3.1 is a Nokia-branded entry-level Android smartphone released in May 2018 by HMD Global. It is the successor to Nokia 3. It was launched with Android 8.0 "Oreo", which could be updated to Android 10. The phone is part of Google's Android One program.

== Design ==
The phone uses a MediaTek MT6750N system-on-chip, containing an octa-core 1.5 GHz ARM Cortex-A53 central processing unit and an ARM Mali-T860 MP2 GPU. The phone has a 2990 mAh Li-ion battery, a 13 megapixel rear camera with an LED flash, and an 8 megapixel front camera. It has an IPS LCD capacitive touchscreen with an 18:9 aspect ratio.

The phone comes with two types of models: a 2 GB RAM variant with 16 GB storage, and a 3 GB RAM variant with 32 GB storage.

The device was initially shipped with Android Oreo. An update to Android Pie was released in June 2019. Its latest security update was for August 2021.

== Reception ==
The Nokia 3.1 received mixed reviews. Andrew Williams of TechRadar praised the phone’s design, screen quality and "effective HDR" while criticising the "poor performance and storage".
