= Nokia 5.1 =

Nokia-branded upper midrange Android smartphone

- Brand: Nokia
- Developer: HMD Global
- Manufacturer: Foxconn
- Type: Smartphone
- First released: July 2018; 7 years ago
- Predecessor: Nokia 5
- Successor: Nokia 5.3
- Related: Nokia 1 Plus; Nokia 2.1; Nokia 3.1; Nokia 6.1; Nokia 7 Plus; Nokia 8 Sirocco
- Dimensions: 151.1 mm (5.95 in) H 70.7 mm (2.78 in) W 8.2 mm (0.32 in) D
- Weight: 150 g (5.3 oz)
- Operating system: Original: Android 8.0 "Oreo"; Current: Android 10 (Android One)
- System-on-chip: MediaTek MT6755S (Helio P18)
- CPU: Octa-core (4×2.0 GHz & 4×1.2 GHz) Cortex-A53
- GPU: Mali-T860 MP2
- Memory: 2 or 3 GB RAM
- Storage: 16 or 32 GB
- Removable storage: microSD, up to 256 GB
- Battery: Non-removable Li-Po 2970 mAh
- Rear camera: 16 MP
- Front camera: 8 MP
- Display: 2160×1080 1080p IPS LCD capacitive touchscreen; Gorilla Glass 3; 5.5 in (140 mm), 439 ppi
- Website: www.hmd.com/en_int/nokia-5-1

The Nokia 5.1 is a Nokia-branded mid-range smartphone running the Android operating system. It was released in 2018 and is the successor of the Nokia 5.

== Design ==
The Nokia 5.1 features a 5.5 inch IPS LCD, a 2 GHz MediaTek Helio P18 chipset paired with either 2 or 3 GB of RAM and a 16 MP primary camera along with a wide-angle 8 MP front camera. The device was initially shipped with Android Oreo, but can be updated to Android 10.

== Reception ==
The Nokia 5.1 generally received positive reviews. Basil Kronfli of TechRadar and Trusted Reviews praised the device for its design and screen, while criticizing the "Occasionally laggy UI, Mediocre camera performance and Bottom-firing mono speaker".
