= Nokia 9 PureView =

Android smartphone

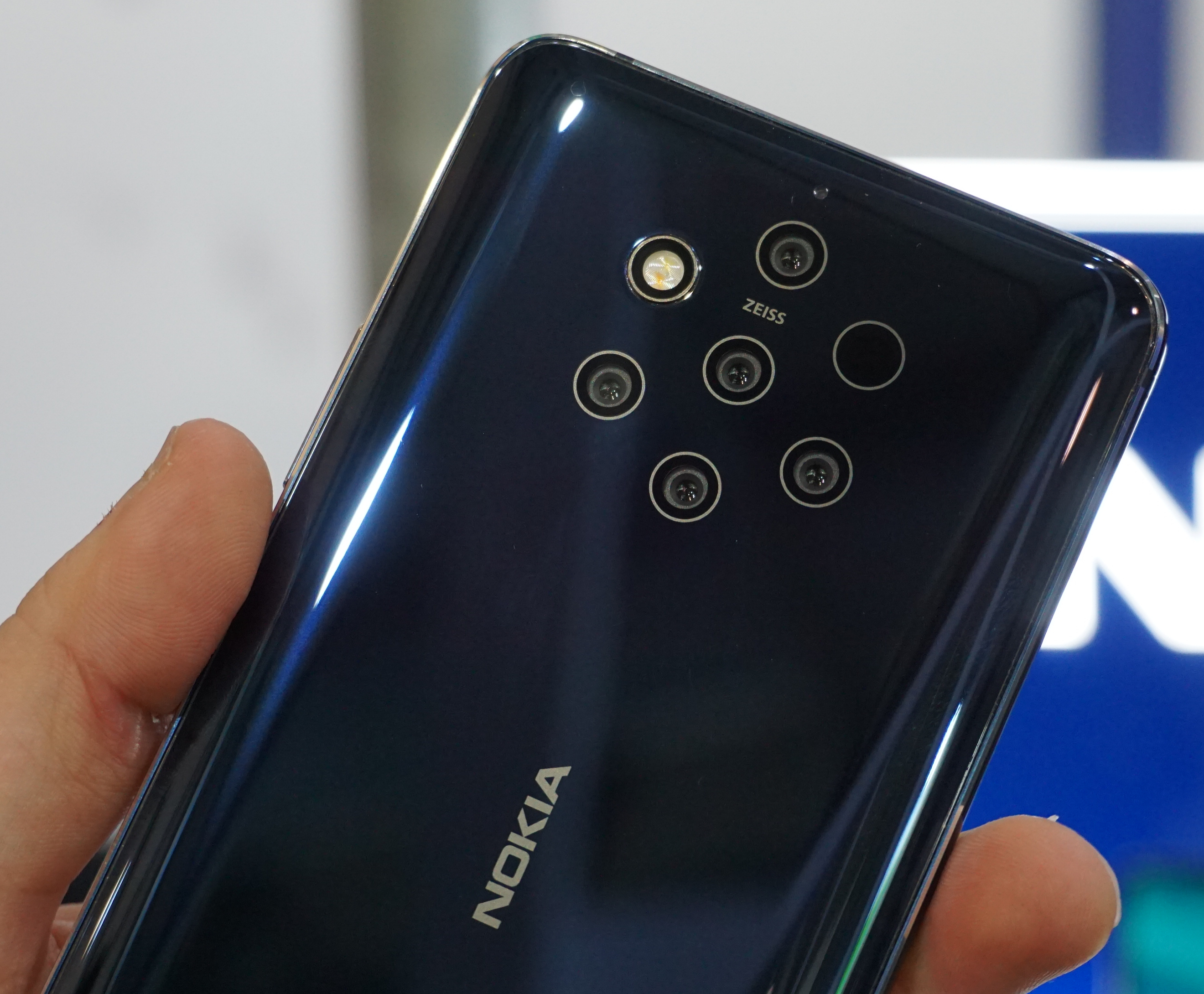
- The penta-camera setup on the rear panel
- Brand: Nokia
- Developer: HMD Global
- Manufacturer: Foxconn
- Type: Smartphone
- First released: 8 February 2019; 7 years ago
- Predecessor: Nokia 8 Sirocco; Nokia Lumia 1020 & Lumia McLaren (spiritual)
- Related: List of HMD Global products
- Dimensions: H: 155 mm (6.1 in); W: 75 mm (3.0 in); D: 8 mm (0.31 in)
- Weight: 172 g (6.1 oz)
- Operating system: Original: Android 9.0 "Pie"; Current: Android 10 (Android One)
- System-on-chip: Qualcomm Snapdragon 845 (10 nm)
- CPU: Octa-core (4x2.8 GHz Kryo 385 Gold & 4x1.7 GHz Kryo 385 Silver)
- GPU: Adreno 630
- Memory: 6 GB LPDDR4X RAM
- Storage: 128 GB UFS 2.1
- Battery: 3320 mAh Li-Po, non-removable
- Charging: Qi wireless charging
- Rear camera: Penta Camera Set-up: 5x 12 MP (f/1.8, 28mm, 1/2.9", 1.25 μm) Wide (2x RGB & 3x B/W cameras, working simultaneously) + ToF sensor 3D, Depth; ZEISS optics, dual-LED dual-tone flash, HDR, panorama Video: 4K@30fps, 1080p@30fps, HDR
- Front camera: 20 MP (f/2.0, 1/2.8", 1.0 μm) Wide; HDR; Video: 4K@30fps, 1080p@30fps, HDR
- Display: 5.99 in (15.2 cm) (92.6 cm^{2}) 1440p QHD pOLED with HDR10 and Gorilla Glass 5 protection, ~538 ppi pixel density
- Connectivity: LTE Cat16 1024 Mbps DL / Cat13 150 Mbps UL; Bluetooth 5.0; USB 3.1 via USB-C port; NFC
- Data inputs: Sensors: Fingerprint scanner (under display, optical); Accelerometer; Gyroscope; Proximity sensor; Electronic compass; Hall sensor; Barometer
- Other: IP67 dust and water resistance
- Website: www.hmd.com/en_int/nokia-9-pureview

The Nokia 9 PureView is a Nokia-branded flagship penta-camera smartphone developed by HMD Global. It was introduced at the 2019 Mobile World Congress (MWC) in Barcelona, Spain as a successor to the Nokia 8 Sirocco. It alludes to Nokia's previous camera-centric PureView devices, which ended with the Lumia 950 and 950 XL. Like most of HMD's Nokia smartphones of the time, the 9 PureView is part of the Android One program.

== Specifications ==
=== Hardware and Design ===
Key upgrades over the Nokia 8 Sirocco include a faster Snapdragon 845 chip and Adreno 630 GPU, a taller 6-inch 18:9 screen with HDR10 support, a higher resolution HDR selfie camera that can now record in 4K, more LTE bands, faster wireless charging, an in-display fingerprint scanner, and a slightly larger battery capacity. Storage and RAM are unchanged, with a single 128 GB/6 GB configuration. At the rear, a multi-camera setup is featured in a honeycomb-like arrangement with a dual-LED flash and time-of-flight sensor (ToF) offset to the left and right respectively, and a hole for the microphone above. Externally, the 9 keeps the glass/metal construction of the Sirocco, but it shelves the Sirocco's stainless steel chassis in favor of 6000 series aluminum.

=== Cameras ===
The 9 PureView uses a penta-camera system with ZEISS optics, 2 of which are RGB sensors and 3 of which are monochromatic sensors. All 5 lenses are identical 12 MP f/1.8 units (Sony Exmor RS IMX 386). HDR is supported, but the device lacks phase-detection, autofocus and optical image stabilization (OIS). When a picture is taken, each camera takes a separate image, then the images are combined and processed by a digital signal processor. Pictures can be taken in both JPEG and RAW formats and can be edited afterwards through Adobe Lightroom, which can be installed during setup. Additionally, the 9 has a Pro mode which simulates DSLR settings. A feature called Depth Map captures more than 1200 layers of depth data. Depth Map is enabled by the time-of-flight sensor (ToF) and only works with JPEG and RGB photos. At the front, a 20 MP sensor is present with HDR. The 9 PureView is the only Android phone to have a penta-camera system.

=== Software ===
The Nokia 9 ships with Android One's version of Android 9 Pie pre-installed.

In December 2019, HMD began to release Android 10 for the 9 PureView.

In late 2021, Nokia announced cancelling all plans of ever upgrading it to Android 11 and beyond, and offered a discount for another Nokia smartphone instead to customers.

== Reception ==
PCMag concluded that the 9 "could be the right smartphone for shutterbugs, but there are better options for everyone else". Praise was directed towards the design, display, and software; Tom's Guide and Digital Trends felt that the RAW-Lightroom integration provided users with significantly more control over photographs. The in-display fingerprint scanner and battery life were both criticized, in addition to the loudspeaker's sound quality. Reviewers also noted that the image processing was slow and were disappointed that a camera-oriented phone lacked an SD card slot, especially considering the size of RAW image files. The usage of an older Snapdragon 845 chip also drew some criticism initially, as its competitors were using the newer Snapdragon 855 chip.

The 9 PureView received an overall score of 85 from DxOMark (matching that of Apple's iPhone 7 and LG's V30), with a photo score of 88 and a video score of 80. DxOMark remarked that "With the possible exception to its Bokeh capability, the Nokia 9 PureView doesn't deliver either a photo or video performance on a par with other current model phones in its premium price range."

In February 2020, the 9 PureView won a Good Design Award 2019.
