= Android Pie =

2018 Android mobile operating system

Android 9 Pie
- Version of the Android operating system

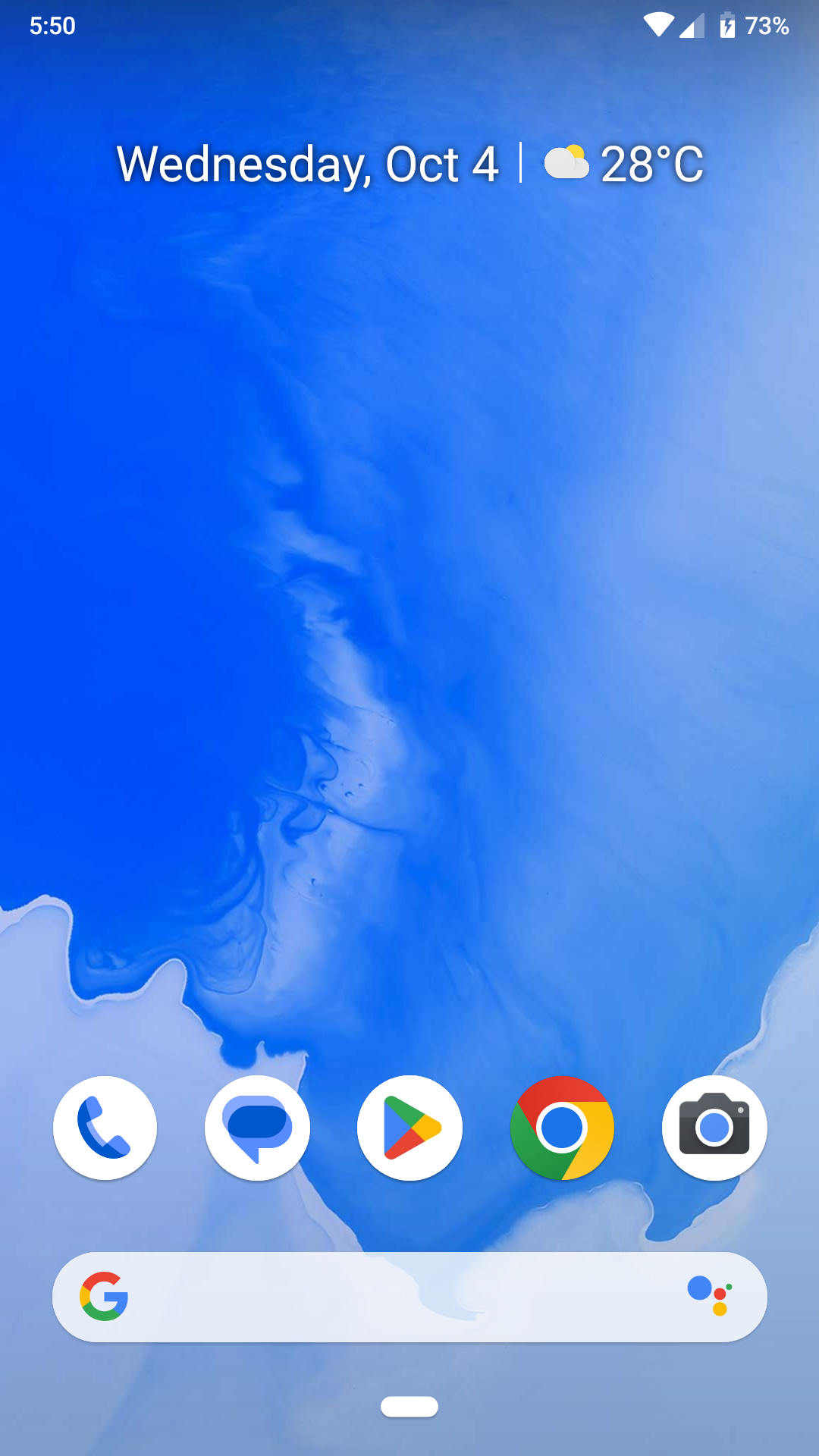
- Android Pie home screen with Pixel Launcher
- Developer: Google
- General availability: August 6, 2018; 8 years ago
- Final release: 9.0.0_r76 (PSV1.210329.021) / January 4, 2022; 4 years ago
- Final preview: P Beta 4 / Developer Preview 5 (PPP5.180610.010) / July 25, 2018; 8 years ago
- Kernel type: Monolithic (Linux)
- Preceded by: Android 8.x Oreo
- Succeeded by: Android 10
- Official website: www.android.com/versions/pie-9-0/

Support status
- Unsupported as of January 4, 2022; Google Play Services supported

Android 9 Pie (codenamed Android P during development) is the ninth major release and the 16th version of the Android mobile operating system. It was first released as a developer preview on March 7, 2018, and was released publicly on August 6, 2018.

On August 6, 2018, Google officially announced the final release of Android 9 under the title "Pie", with the update initially available for current Google Pixel devices, and releases for Android One devices and others to follow "later this year". The Essential Phone was the first third-party Android device to receive an update to Pie, notably coming day-and-date with its final release. The Sony Xperia XZ3 was the first device with Android Pie pre-installed.

As of June 2026, 2.26% of Android devices run Android 9 Pie, making it the 8th most widely used version of Android.

== History ==
Android Pie, then referred to as "Android P", was first announced by Google on March 7, 2018, and the first developer preview was released on the same day. The second preview, the first beta release, was released on May 8, 2018. The third preview, called Beta 2, was released on June 6, 2018. The fourth preview, called Beta 3, was released on July 2, 2018. The final beta of Android P was released on July 25, 2018.

Android Pie was the last version to be named after a confectionery product, with subsequent versions having only a numeric version.

== Features ==
=== User experience ===
Android Pie refreshes the operating system's user interface to adopt Material Design 2; the revamp offers greater aesthetic variety, encouraging the creation of custom "themes" that follow the base guidelines and components rather than a standardized appearance. Bottom-aligned navigation bars are also more prominent. In Android Pie's interface, rounded corners (influenced by the proprietary Google theme used by in-house software implementing Material Design 2) are more prominent.

Pie adds official support for screen cutouts (including "notches" and "hole-punch" designs), including APIs for adjusting UI elements and behaviors depending on their size and position. Android certification requirements limit devices to two cutouts, which may appear only at the top or bottom of the screen.

The most significant user interface change on Pie is a redesigned on-screen navigation bar. Unlike previous versions of Android, it consists only of a slim home button and a back button rendered only when available. The bar utilizes gesture navigation: swiping up opens the "Overview" screen, a redesign of the existing recent apps menu. Swiping the handle to the right activates application switching. The gesture bar is primarily used on new devices such as the Pixel 3; on existing devices, users can either use the previous navigation key setup or opt into gesture navigation. As opposed to the previous recent apps menu, Overview utilizes a horizontal layout rather than vertical, and text may also be selected and copied from apps appearing there (although this uses OCR rather than the native text as to conserve resources). The Pixel Launcher also lets you access the app drawer and most recently used apps from the overview. However, this integration is proprietary, and there are no current plans to offer it to third-party software due to security concerns. In addition, when rotation lock is enabled, rotating the device causes a screen rotation button to appear on the navigation bar.

The notification area was redesigned, with the clock moved to the left and the number of icons displayed at once limited to 4 to accommodate displays with a "notch" cutout in the center. The drop-down panels attached to quick settings items have been removed; long-pressing a toggle directs users to the relevant settings screen. Notifications for chats can now be threaded, displaying previous messages within (complementing the existing inline reply functionality). If a particular type of notification is frequently dismissed, the user will now be offered the option to turn it off. The Do Not Disturb mode has been overhauled with a larger array of settings.

The power menu now includes a screenshot button (which now supports cropping an image after taking one) and an optional "lockdown" mode that turns off biometric unlock methods. The volume pop-up now only controls media volume, as well as the choice of sound, vibration, or silent modes for notifications. Users are directed to the settings menu to adjust notification volume. A magnifier display has been added to text selection, and "smart linkify" offers access to relevant apps if particular types of text (such as phone numbers or addresses) are highlighted.

Pie introduced Digital Wellbeing, a feature aimed at curbing smartphone addiction.

=== Platform ===
Android Pie introduces a major change to power management, using algorithms to prioritize background activity by apps based on long-term usage patterns and predictions, dividing apps into "Active", "Working Set" (run often), "Frequent", "Rare", and "Never". Similar "adaptive brightness" settings are adjusted automatically based on detected lighting conditions. Both of these features were developed in collaboration with DeepMind.

The "PrecomputedText" API (also available as a compatibility library compatible with Android 4.0 and newer) can be used to perform text display processing in a background thread rather than a UI thread, improving performance.

The fingerprint authentication API has also been revamped to support different biometric authentication experiences (including face scanning and in-screen fingerprint readers).

Android Runtime (ART) can now create compressed bytecode files. In addition, ART's profile-guided optimization introduced in Android 7.0 is further enhanced in Android Pie by uploading profiler data to Google Play servers; the data is bundled with apps when downloaded by users with similar devices. This allows fresh app installs to have improved startup performance.

Apps targeting older Android API levels (beginning with Android 4.2) display a warning when launched. The Google Play Store is now requiring all apps to target an API level released within the past year, and will also mandate 64-bit support in 2019.

Android Pie supports IEEE 802.11mc, including Wi-Fi Round Trip Time for location positioning.

The camera API now supports accessing multiple cameras at once. Apps may no longer perform background audio or video recording unless they run a foreground service. There is support for the High Efficiency Image File Format (subject to patent licensing and hardware support) and VP9 Profile 2.

DNS over TLS is supported under the name "Private DNS".

Android Go for Android Pie uses less storage than the previous release and has enhancements to security and storage tracking.

== Reception ==
Shortly after launch, several users of Pixel devices and the Essential Phone reported a decrease in battery life. As Android Pie became available to more phones, some users on various devices reported similar comparisons.

== See also ==
- Android version history
