= Micromax Canvas 2 Plus A110Q =

Android smartphone

- Manufacturer: Micromax Mobile
- Type: Smartphone
- Series: Micromax Canvas
- First released: May 2013; 13 years ago
- Predecessor: Micromax Canvas 2 A110
- Form factor: Slate
- Dimensions: 147 mm (5.8 in) H 76.5 mm (3.01 in) W 9.7 mm (0.38 in) D
- Weight: 164 g (5.8 oz)
- Operating system: Android v4.2 (Jelly Bean)
- System-on-chip: MediaTek MT6589
- CPU: Quad-core 1.2 GHz
- GPU: PowerVR SGX 544
- Memory: 1 GB RAM
- Storage: 4 GB internal storage (1.5 GB user available) + Up to 32 GB on microSD memory card
- Battery: Li-Ion 2000 mAh
- Rear camera: 8.0 MP (3264 x 2448) autofocus, dual LED flash
- Front camera: 2.0 MP
- Display: 5 in (130 mm) IPS panel with 480×854 pixels 196 ppi)
- Connectivity: Bluetooth 4.0 with A2DP microUSB 2.0 with OTG; 3.5 mm audio jack aGPS; Wi-Fi 802.11 b/g/n GSM 900 / 1800 / 1900 - SIM 1 & SIM 2 HSDPA 2100
- Data inputs: Multi-touch capacitive touchscreen, Accelerometer, proximity sensor
- Development status: In production
- Website: www.micromaxinfo.com

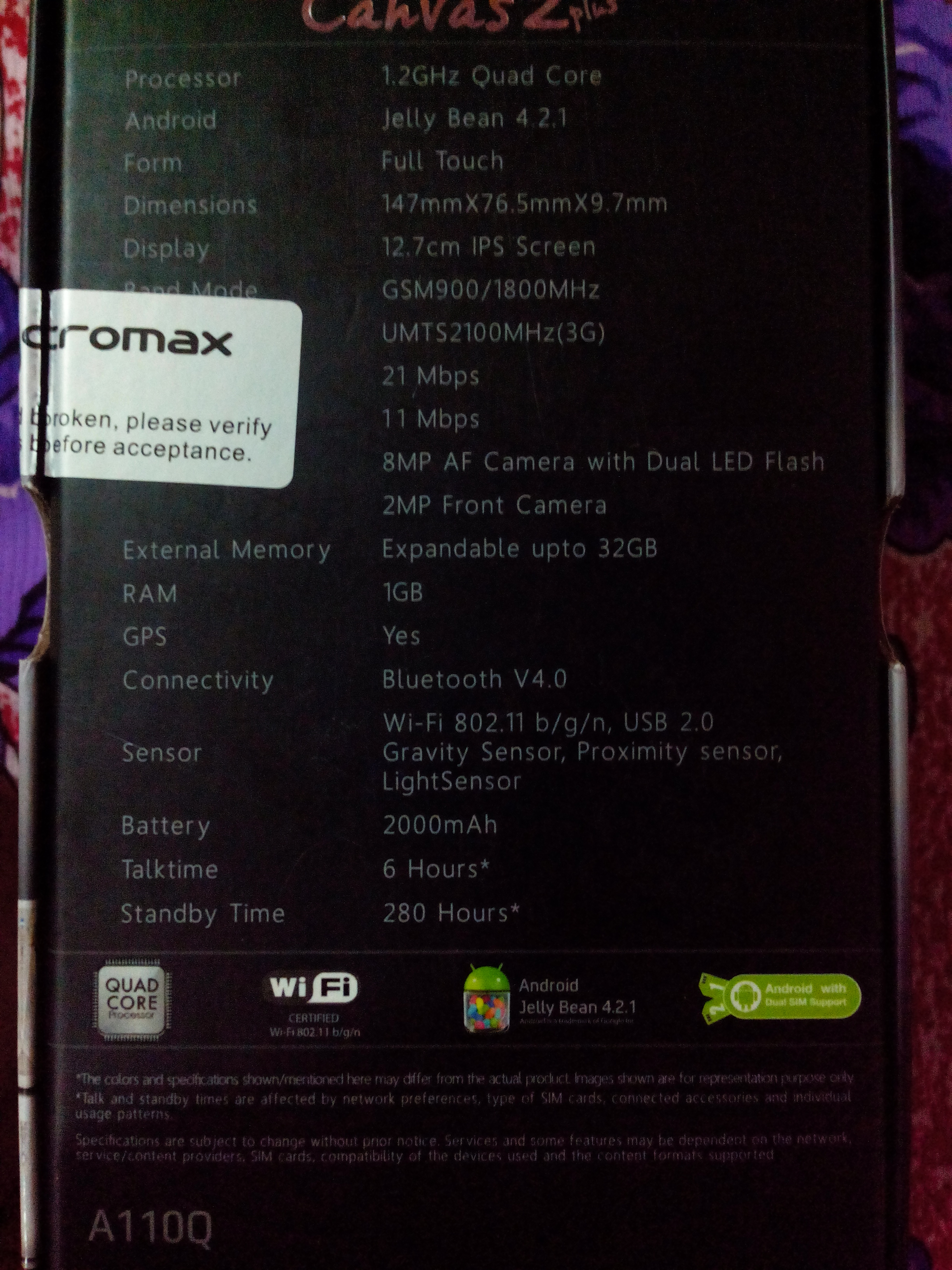
Box back cover

Micromax Canvas 2 Plus A110Q is a dual-sim Android smartphone by Micromax Mobile launched in May 2013 featuring a 1.2 GHz Quad-core processor, 1 GB of RAM and a 5.0 IPS LCD screen. It supersedes Micromax Canvas 2 A110 with improvements primarily in CPU, RAM and front camera.
