= Micromax Ninja A89 =

Dual SIM Android smartphone

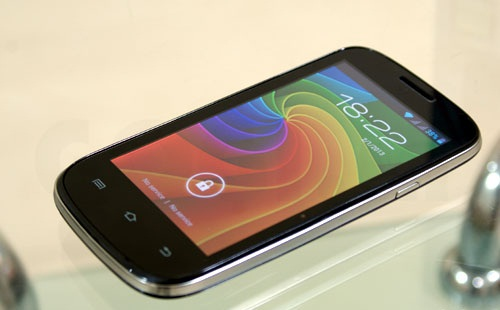
- Micromax Ninja A89
- Type: Smartphone
- First released: February 2013
- Development status: Not in production

The Micromax Ninja A89 is a dual SIM Android smartphone launched and marketed by Micromax Mobile. It was launched in February 2013 in India. The phone is now discontinued.

This phone offers only 512 MB internal memory but it can be increased to greater extent by using various memory partition tools like RAMEXPANDER app.

== Features ==
- Processor: 1 GHz Mediatek MT6577(Dual core)
- OS: Android 4.0.4 ICS
- Dimensions: 124×64×10.6mm
- Display: 10.1 cm, TFT 262K Color 480 x 800 pixels, 3.97 inches (~235 ppi pixel density)
- Multi Touch: 2 Point
- Band Mode: GSM 900/1800 MHz WCDMA 2100 MHz
- HSDPA: 7.1 Mbit/s
- HSUPA: 5.76 Mbit/s
- Camera: 3 MP FF Camera 640*480Rec,1280*720 playback, No Flash
- Memory: ROM 4 GB, Internal Memory 2.07 GB, Expandable Memory 32 GB Micro SD, RAM 512 MB
- GPS: Yes with A-GPS support
- Connectivity: Bluetooth 2.1, USB 2.0, 3G, Wi-Fi, Bluetooth tethering is supported. Wi-Fi Hotspot is supported.
- Sensors: Gravity, Proximity
- Battery: 1450mAh
- Talktime: 4 Hours claimed
- Standby Time: 170 Hours claimed
- Multimedia: 3GP, MP4, MP3, WAV, MIDI, Video Frame Rate 30fps, FM Radio
- Color: Black
- Connectors: Micro USB, Ear Jack 3.5 mm
- Applications: Hook up, M! live, M! store, M! Zone+, Fruit Devil, Darkman

== See also ==
- Micromax Canvas 2 A110
- List of Android devices
