= Micromax IN 1B =

Android smartphone

- Brand: Micromax
- Manufacturer: Micromax
- Type: Smartphone
- Series: IN Series
- First released: Announced :3 November 2020; Released: 24 November 2020
- Successor: Micromax IN 2B
- Related: Micromax IN Note 1
- Compatible networks: 2G Network :- GSM B2/3/5/8 3G Network:- WCDMA B1/5/8 4G Network:- LTE B1/3/5/8/40/41(120 MHz) Carrier Aggregation:- DL Intra-Band CA NCCA:B1/3/5/40, CCA:B3/5/40.
- Form factor: Slate
- Dimensions: 164.5 H 75.8 W 8.9 T
- Weight: 188 g (7 oz)
- Operating system: Android 10 (Go Edition) in 2GB/32GB Android 10 in 4GB/64GB
- System-on-chip: MediaTek Helio G35
- CPU: Octa-core 8x ARM Cortex A53 @ 2.3GHz
- GPU: PowerVR GE8320 @ 680MHz
- Memory: 2GB or 4GB LPDDR4X
- Storage: 32 GB or 64 GB
- Battery: Li-Po 5000 mAh, non-removable
- Charging: Charging 10W; Reverse charging
- Rear camera: 13 MP, (f/1.9), 26mm (wide), PDAF; 2 MP, (f/2.4), (depth)
- Front camera: 8 MP, (f/2.0)
- Display: 6.52 HD + IPS LCD (720x1600)
- Data inputs: Gyroscope, magnetic sensor, accelerometer, proximity sensor, light sensor
- Made in: India
- Website: Micromax IN 1B

The Micromax In 1B is an Android smartphone developed by the Indian Smartphone manufacturer Micromax Informatics. It is the part of In series by Micromax announced on 3 November 2020, and released on 24 November 2020. The In 1B, along with Micromax IN Note 1, marked the re-entry of the company into the Indian smartphone market after years of little or no activity.

== Specifications ==
=== Hardware ===
The In 1B is powered by a MediaTek Helio G35 SoC, including octa-core 2.3 GHz CPU, and PowerVR GE8320 GPU. The internal storage configurations have two options of 32 GB or 64 GB with 2 GB and 4 GB RAM respectively.

The phone comes with a 6.52-inch touchscreen display with a resolution of 720×1600 pixels and an aspect ratio of 20:9. It is powered by a 5000 mAh non-removable battery. The Micromax In 1b supports 10 W fast charging via a USB Type-C interface. It also has a fingerprint scanner on the back.

=== Software ===
The In 1B is originally shipped with Android 10 in the 4 GB RAM variant and Go Edition of the Android 10 for the 2 GB RAM variant. It runs the stock Android UI with some features added by Micromax.

== Camera ==
The Micromax In 1b on the rear comes with a 13 MP primary camera with an f/1.8 aperture, and a 2 MP micro camera featuring Phase Detection Autofocus, ISO control and Exposure compensation. It has an 8-megapixel camera on the front with a fixed focus for selfies. It also supports high dynamic range (HDR) imaging.
