= Indus Appstore =

Indian app and content discovery platform

Indus Appstore Private Limited
- Formerly: OS Labs Technology (India) Private Limited
- Type: Private
- Founded: 2013; 13 years ago
- Headquarters: Office-2, Floor 4, Wing B, Block A, Salarpuria Softzone, Bellandur Village, Varthur Hobli, Outer Ring Road, Bangalore, India
- Key people: Akash Dongre (CPO); Sudhir Bangarambandi (CTO)
- Products: Indus OS, App Bazaar
- Parent: PhonePe (2022–present)
- Website: www.phonepeappstore.com

Indus OS is an Indian smartphone application and content discovery platform based on Android, with the aim to unify users, developers and smartphone brands on a single platform and to create an Indian smartphone ecosystem. It was originally a custom Android distribution, but switched to an app store in 2019.

The platform aims to address the low smartphone adoption, content consumption and linguistic challenges of Indian markets. The contextual integration provides India's service and content providers a platform to seamlessly distribute their content & services to India's smartphone users.

The company is catering to 10 crore+ users and has partnered with OEMs like Samsung, Karbonn, Micromax and 9 other Indian OEMS.

The company's app marketplace, Phonepe App store (formerly Indus App Bazaar) is the largest Indian app store. It has powered Samsung's default app store, Galaxy Store since 2019.

== About ==
=== First touch OS ===
Indus OS was initially known as "First Touch OS". In May 2015, Micromax Informatics started shipping the latest version (Unite 3) of its Unite series smartphones with Firstouch OS.

In December 2015, Firstouch announced a collaboration with the Government of India's Ministry of Electronics and Information Technology previously known as the Department of Electronics and IT (DeitY) to introduce text-to-speech technology in regional languages.

== Phonepe Appstore ==
The Phonepe Appstore (formerly Indus App Bazaar) is India's largest app store. It is available in 12 Indian languages namely Hindi, Gujarati, Marathi, Tamil, Telugu, Urdu, Odia, Punjabi, Malayalam, Bengali, Assamese and Kannada & English .

The product provides various tools to app developers for distribution and promotions along with data insights for targeting and performance analysis. The app store focuses on providing the users with a personalised and localised experience for smooth discovery of apps and content.
