= Micromax IN Note 1 =

Android smartphone

- Manufacturer: Micromax
- Type: Smartphone
- Series: IN Series
- First released: Announced :3 November 2020; Released: 24 November 2020
- Successor: Micromax IN Note 2
- Related: Micromax IN 1B
- Compatible networks: 2G Network :- GSM B2/3/5/8 3G Network:- WCDMA B1/5/8 4G Network:- LTE B1/3/5/8/40/41(120 MHz) Carrier Aggregation:- DL Intra-Band CA NCCA:B1/3/5/40, CCA:B3/5/40.
- Form factor: slate
- Dimensions: 165.25 H 76.95 W 8.99 T
- Operating system: Stock Android 10
- System-on-chip: Mediatek Helio G85
- CPU: Octa-core 2x ARM Cortex A75 @ 2.0GHz 6x ARM Cortex A55 @ 1.8GHz
- GPU: ARM Mali G52 MC2 @ 1Ghz
- Memory: 4GB LPDDR4X
- Storage: 64 GB or 128 GB
- Battery: 5000 mAh non-removable
- Charging: 18 W Fast Charger
- Rear camera: 48 MP(f/1.79), 5MP(f/2.2), 2MP(f/2.4), 2MP(f/2.4)
- Front camera: 16 MP(f/2.0)
- Display: 6.67 FHD+ IPS LCD (1080x2400)
- Data inputs: Gyroscope, magnetic sensor, accelerometer, proximity sensor, light sensor
- Website: IN Note 1

The Micromax In Note 1 is an Android smartphone developed by the Indian Smartphone manufacturer Micromax Informatics. Announced on 3 November 2020, and released on 24 November 2020, the In Note 1 marks the re-entry of the company into the Indian smartphone market.

== Specifications ==
=== Hardware ===
The In Note 1 is powered by a Mediatek Helio G85 SoC including an octa-core 2.0 GHz CPU, an ARM G52 MC2 GPU. The internal storage is of 64 GB or 128 GB .

The In Note 1 features a 6.67-inch IPS LCD punch hole display with a 1080× 2400 FHD+ pixel display resolution and a pixel density of 395 ppi. The rear camera has a quad camera setup of 48MP+5MP+2MP+2MP sensors. Camera modes include night mode, HDR, Panorama, AI Scene Detection, Beauty, Pro, GIF, Time lapse, Slow-Motion and Portrait mode. The front camera features 16 MP and f/2.0 aperture.

== See also ==
- Micromax Informatics
- YU Televentures
- Android 10
