= Spice Dream Uno =

Smartphone model

- Type: Smartphone
- First released: September 2014; 11 years ago
- Compatible networks: 2G/3G, GSM: 850/900/1800/1900 MHz, WCDMA: 850/2100 MHz
- Form factor: Bar
- Dimensions: 131 mm (5.16 in) H 65 mm (2.56 in) W 8 mm (0.32 in) H
- Weight: 136 g (4.8 oz)
- Operating system: Android 4.4.4 KitKat upgradable to Android 6.0.1 Marshmallow
- System-on-chip: MediaTek MT6582
- CPU: 1.3 GHz quad-core Cortex
- GPU: Mali 400MP
- Memory: 1 GB RAM
- Storage: internal: 4 GB (2.1 GB for Apps); removable storage: microSD cards up to 32 GB
- Battery: 1700 mAh
- Rear camera: 5 MP with autofocus and LED flash
- Front camera: 2 MP 1.4um pixel (fixed focus)
- Display: 4.5 in (110 mm) 480x854 of 218 PPI pixel density, capacitive touchscreen IPS Display
- Sound: Loudspeaker, 3.5 mm headphone jack
- Connectivity: Micro USB, Bluetooth 4.0, Wi-Fi 802.11 b/g/n, Micro-SIM SAR
- Data inputs: Multi-touch capacitive touchscreen
- Codename: Sprout (shared among all Android One phones)

The Spice Dream Uno is a mobile phone co-developed by Google as a part of its Android One initiative. The initiative is headed by Sundar Pichai in an effort to provide affordable, yet feature-rich smartphones to developing nations. India is the first country to promote and sell the phone, which was first made available on September 10, 2014 through Flipkart for online customers. A few months later the smartphone was made available on Amazon, Saholic, Snapdeal and at some retail outlets in India such as Mobile Store and Spice Hotspot. The phone shares the same features as the Micromax Canvas A1.

== Specification ==
=== Hardware ===
The Spice Dream Uno is powered by a 1.3 GHz Quad-Core Mediatek MT6582 processor with 1 GB RAM. It has 4 GB of internal storage that is expandable to 32 GB through a microSD card slot. It has a 1700 mAh Li-Po battery and a 4.5-inch screen with 480x854 resolution (218 PPI) IPS LCD. It also includes both a 5-megapixel rear-facing camera with autofocus and a 2.4-megapixel front-facing camera. Spice Dream Uno follows FCC SAR standard. The SAR limit recommended by the FCC is 1.6 W/kg. The highest SAR value tested for this phone model is 0.24 W/kg @ 1g (Head) W/kg @ 1 g (Head) and 0.93 W/kg @ 1g (Body) W/Kg @ 1g(Body).

=== Software ===
It was launched with Android 4.4.4 (KitKat) and was the first among all OEMS in India to get the latest Android 5.1 Lollipop update on June 5, 2015 to fix minor bugs.

Later, The device got Android 6.0 and Android 6.0.1 Marshmallow update to enhance battery life and improve performance of the device.
