= Xiaomi Mi A2 =

Android smartphone manufactured by Xiaomi

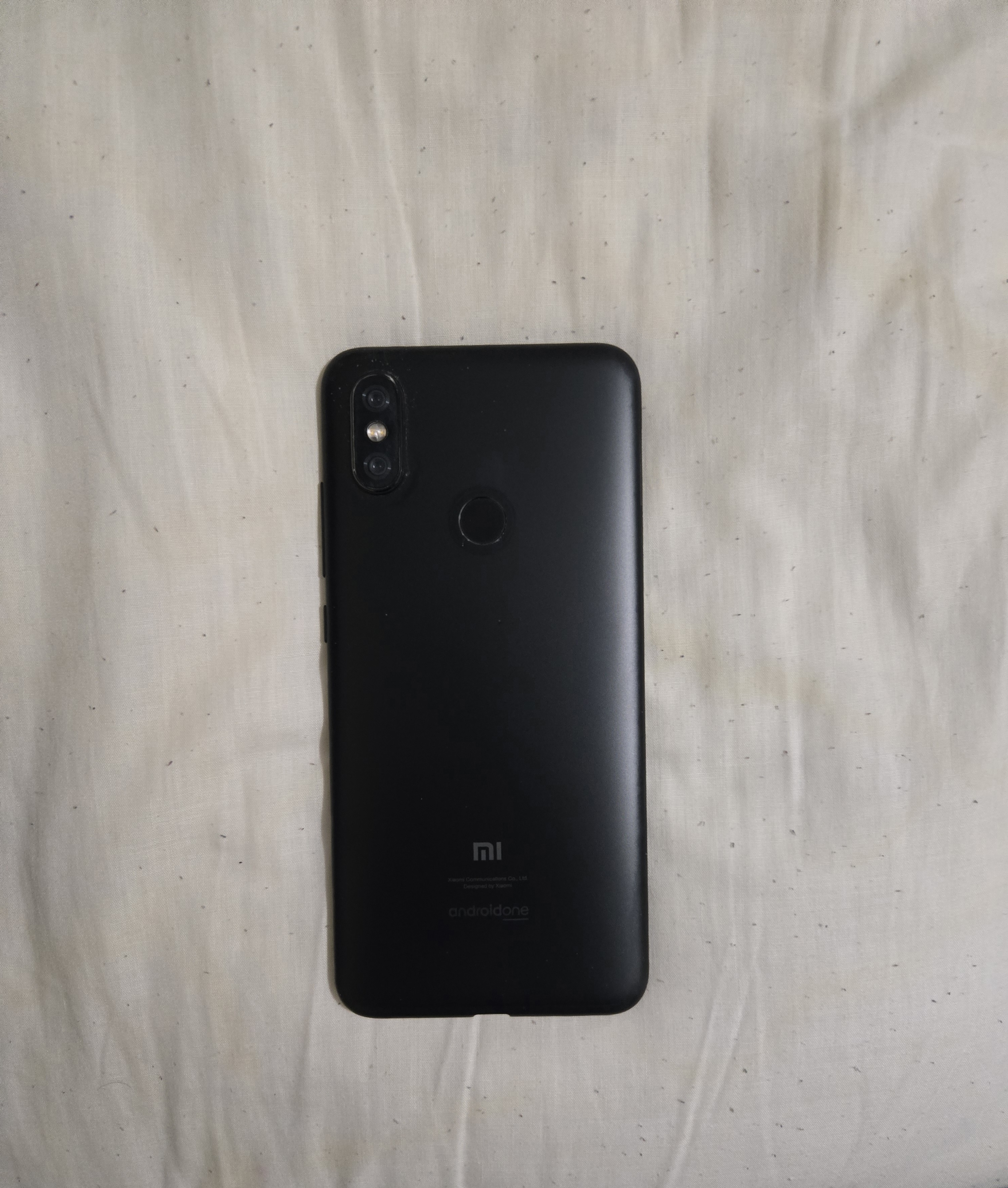
- A 2019 Mi A2 model
- Manufacturer: Xiaomi
- Type: Touchscreen smartphone
- Series: Mi A
- First released: July 2018; 7 years ago
- Predecessor: Xiaomi Mi A1; Redmi Note 5
- Successor: Xiaomi Mi A3; Redmi Note 7 Xiaomi Mi 8 Lite
- Related: Xiaomi Mi A2 Lite; Redmi Note 6 Pro
- Form factor: Slate
- Dimensions: 158.7 mm (6.25 in) H; 75.4 mm (2.97 in) W; 7.3 mm (0.29 in) D
- Weight: 166 g (5.9 oz)
- Operating system: Android 8.1 "Oreo", upgrade-able to Android 10 Ubuntu Touch OTA-25 PixelExperience 13 based on Android 13
- System-on-chip: Qualcomm SDM660 Snapdragon 660
- CPU: Octa-core (4x2.2GHz Cortex-A73 + 4x1.84GHz Cortex-A53)
- GPU: Adreno 512
- Memory: 4/6 GB RAM
- Storage: 32/64/128 GB
- Battery: Non-removable Li-Po 3010 mAh battery
- Rear camera: Dual 12/20 MP phase detection autofocus, dual-LED (dual tone) flash
- Front camera: 20 MP 1.0 μm pixel size, geo-tagging, touch focus, face detection, HDR, panorama
- Display: 5.99 in (152 mm) LTPS LCD, 1080 x 2160 pixels, ~403 ppi, 16M colors
- Codename: Xiaomi Mi A2: jasmine Xiaomi Mi 6X: wayne

The Xiaomi Mi A2 (also known as the Xiaomi Mi 6X in China) is a mid-range smartphone co-developed by Xiaomi and Google as part of Android One program.

== Specifications ==
=== Hardware ===
The phone features a 5.99 inches Full HD+ IPS LCD with 1080 x 2160 pixels and 403 ppi pixel density, unimetal body and Corning Gorilla Glass 5 protection. It is powered by Qualcomm Snapdragon 660 SoC with Adreno 512 GPU.and has a 2.0, Type-C 1.0 reversible connector. It has a dual rear camera setup with 12 MP Sony IMX486 primary camera (1.25 μm pixel size and f/1.75 aperture) and 20 MP Sony IMX376 secondary camera (2.0 μm pixel size and f/1.75 aperture). The front camera is 20 MP Sony IMX376 sensor with 2.0 μm pixel size with f/2.2 aperture. It has a 3010 mAh battery which supports Qualcomm Quick Charge 3.0 (4.0 for India).

This is the first mid-range Xiaomi smartphone to remove the 3.5 mm audio jack and microSD slot.

=== Software ===
The Xiaomi Mi A2 is part of the Android One program where software updates are provided directly from Google. The Mi 6X variant runs on Xiaomi's MIUI.

It is preinstalled with Android 8.1.0 "Oreo" out of the box, and can be upgraded to Android 10. Unofficially, the stock operating system can be replaced with Ubuntu Touch or PixelExperience.

As a part of the Android One program, Mi A2 provides a Stock Android experience and UI very close to Google Pixel UI.

=== Release ===
The Xiaomi Mi A2 is a re-branded Xiaomi Mi 6X phone. The Xiaomi Mi 6X was first released in April 2018, while the A2 was released in July 2018. A stripped-down version of the phone was released on the same month known as Xiaomi Mi A2 Lite.

The Mi A2 Lite, however, did include 3.5 mm audio jack, microSD slot and a higher battery capacity (4000 mAh). Unlike the regular Mi A2, the Mi A2 Lite is based on Xiaomi's budget Redmi series. A variant of this phone is known as Redmi 6 Pro, which shares the same hardware specification, but runs on MIUI user interface instead of Android One.
