= YU Yureka =

Android-based cyanogen smartphone

- Manufacturer: YU
- Type: Touchscreen smartphone
- Series: YU
- First released: January 2015
- Successor: YU Yureka Plus
- Related: YU Yuphoria
- Compatible networks: GSM/GPRS/WCDMA/LTE; LTE TDD B40 2300MHz; LTE FDD B3 1800MHz; WCDMA 900/2100MHz; GSM 900/1800/1900MHz
- Form factor: Phablet
- Dimensions: 154.8 mm (6.09 in) H 78 mm (3.1 in) W 8.8 mm (0.35 in) D.
- Weight: 155 g (5.5 oz)
- Operating system: CyanogenMod 11 based on Android 4.4.4 "Kitkat" Upgradable to CM 12.1 based on Android Lollipop 5.1.1, Android 6.0 expected
- System-on-chip: Qualcomm Snapdragon 615 MSM8939
- CPU: (ARM Cortex-A53 1.7 GHz CPU + ARM Cortex-A53 1.0 GHz CPU)
- GPU: Adreno 405
- Memory: 2 GB DDR3
- Storage: 16 GB (12.8 User Available)
- Battery: 2500 mAh Li-ion
- Rear camera: Sony IMX214 BSI 13 megapixels with 5P lens architecture List: LED flash; HD video (1080p) at 30 frames/s (fps) 720p slow motion video recording at 60 FPS
- Front camera: 5 megapixels with 71° Wide Angle lens
- Display: 1280x720 px (267 ppi), 5.5 in (140 mm) diagonal, IPS LCD capacitive touchscreen, 16M colors
- Connectivity: List: Wi-Fi :802.11 a/b/g/n/ac (2.4/5 GHz); Wi-Fi hotspot; GPS; Bluetooth 4.0 BLE; USB 2.0 (Micro-B port, USB charging); 3.50 mm (0.138 in) headphone jack
- Data inputs: List: Accelerometer; Gyroscope; Proximity sensor; RGB ambient light
- Model: AO5510
- Development status: Discontinued
- SAR: 0.270W/kg @ 1g (head) and 0.576 W/kg @ 1g (body)
- Website: http://www.yuplaygod.com/yureka

YU Yureka is an Android-based Cyanogen smartphone produced by YU Televentures, a subsidiary company of Micromax Informatics. It has a caption "Play God". The device was released in January 2015 exclusively on the Amazon India website at a price of INR 8,999. It is the first phone from the Yu brand and offers great specifications at low prices, focusing on the increased customisation options offered by the CyanogenMod operating system that Yu preloads onto its devices. The Yureka (Review) and Yuphoria (Review),

== Specifications ==
Volume rocker button is located on the left side and the power/standby button on the right. The 3.5 mm audio-jack is located on top and the micro USB charging and data transfer port is located on the base. There is no Micromax branding on the phone, instead, the YU brand name in a light blue colour is visible on the back.

=== Hardware ===
==== Processor and storage ====
It's powered by the 64-bit ARMv8 Qualcomm Snapdragon 615(MSM8939) system on chip which houses an octa-core processor and the Adreno 405 GPU clocked at 550 MHz. It comes paired with 2 GB of DDR3 RAM and offers 16 GB of storage of which 12.8 GB is available to the user. The storage is expandable via the microSD card slot by 32 GB.

==== Display ====
The 5.5-inch(Plus Version) IPS panel display comes with Corning Gorilla Glass 3 protection. The resolution of the display is 1280*720 which accounts to 267 PPI pixel density.

=== Software ===
It runs on the Cyanogen 11 ROM based on Android KitKat 4.4 which is Upgradable to Cyanogen 12S based on Android 5.0.2 Lollipop. Official Cyanogen 12 ROM based on Android Lollipop 5.0.2 is also released for the Yureka. Official Cyanogen 12.1 OTA update based on Android Lollipop 5.1 was also released for the Yureka in September 2015. Also an incremental update was released in April 2016. YU has included some of its special apps on the phone such as AudioFX, ScreenCast, Themes and YUniverse.

The Yu Yureka houses a 2500 mAh battery. The phone comes with a 1 A charger, so it takes about 2 hours for 0 to 100.
