= Android 1 =

Android 1 could refer to:

- Android 1.0, the first version of the Android operating system
- Android One, a near-stock version of the Android operating system
