= Micromax Canvas HD A116 =

Android phablet

- Micromax Canvas HD A116
- Manufacturer: Chinese OEM
- Series: Micromax Canvas
- First released: 14 February 2013; 13 years ago
- Predecessor: Micromax Canvas 2 A110
- Form factor: Slate
- Dimensions: 144 mm × 74 mm × 10.7 mm (5.67 in × 2.91 in × 0.42 in)
- Weight: 156 g (5.5 oz)
- Operating system: Android v4.1.2 Jelly Bean later updated to 4.2.1
- CPU: Quad-core MediaTeK MT6589 1.2 GHz Cortex-A7
- GPU: PowerVR Series5XT
- Memory: 1 GB (RAM)
- Storage: 4 GB (ROM) + Up to 32 GB on microSD memory card
- Battery: Li-Ion 2000 mAh
- Rear camera: 8.0 MP (3264 x 2448) autofocus, dual LED flash
- Front camera: 2.0 MP
- Display: 5.0 inch 720 x 1280 pixels px IPS LCD capacitive touchscreen, 16M colors
- Connectivity: Bluetooth 4.0 with A2DP microUSB 2.0; 3.5 mm audio jack aGPS; Wi-Fi 802.11 b/g/n GSM 900 / 1800 - SIM 1 & SIM 2 HSDPA 2100
- Data inputs: Multi-touch capacitive touchscreen, Accelerometer
- Development status: In production
- SAR: 0.472 W/kg (head)
- Website: www.micromaxinfo.com

Micromax Canvas HD A116 is a dual-sim Android phablet by Micromax Mobile which is a rebranded Wiko Cink Five superseding the Micromax Canvas 2 A110. The device was exclusively launched with Snapdeal.com also found in Facebook for the advertisements on 14 February 2013 with featuring a 1.2 GHz Quad-core processor, 1 GB of RAM and a 5.0 IPS LCD (HD) screen.

== Design ==
Micromax Canvas HD has a large 5 inch IPS LCD screen with resolution of 1280x720. The screen is protected by AGC Sodalime scratch resistant coating but as compared to Corning Gorilla Glass it's not too efficient in protecting the display of this phablet. The bottom has 3 capacitive haptic feedback buttons -MENU, HOME, BACK. The phone is curved at the edges and the back panel is made of plastic with glossy or matte white finish. On the top there is a 3.5mm jack for headphones and a Micro USB port for data transfer and charging. The phone has a Micromax branding, 8MP auto focus LED flash at the back. There is a 2 MP secondary front camera for video calls. There is a light sensor to control the screen brightness. Notification LED beside the ear speaker, Volume rocker to the left with a secondary microphone beside the rear camera and speaker grill at bottom back side.

== Hardware ==
Micromax A116 Canvas HD is powered by MediaTek MT6589 quad ARM Cortex A7 CPU and PowerVR SGX544MP2 GPU. It has 1 GB RAM, 4 GB ROM and micro SD card slot expandable up to 32 GB. It has 0.96 GB free for apps and 1.7 GB free for mass storage. It has 8 Mega pixel rear and 2 mega pixel front camera. It is a 720p HD smartphone.

== See also ==
- Samsung Galaxy SIII
- Samsung Galaxy Grand
- Micromax Canvas 2 A110
- List of Android devices
