= Xiaomi Mi A1 =

2017 Smartphone developed by Xiaomi and Google

Xiaomi Mi A1/5X

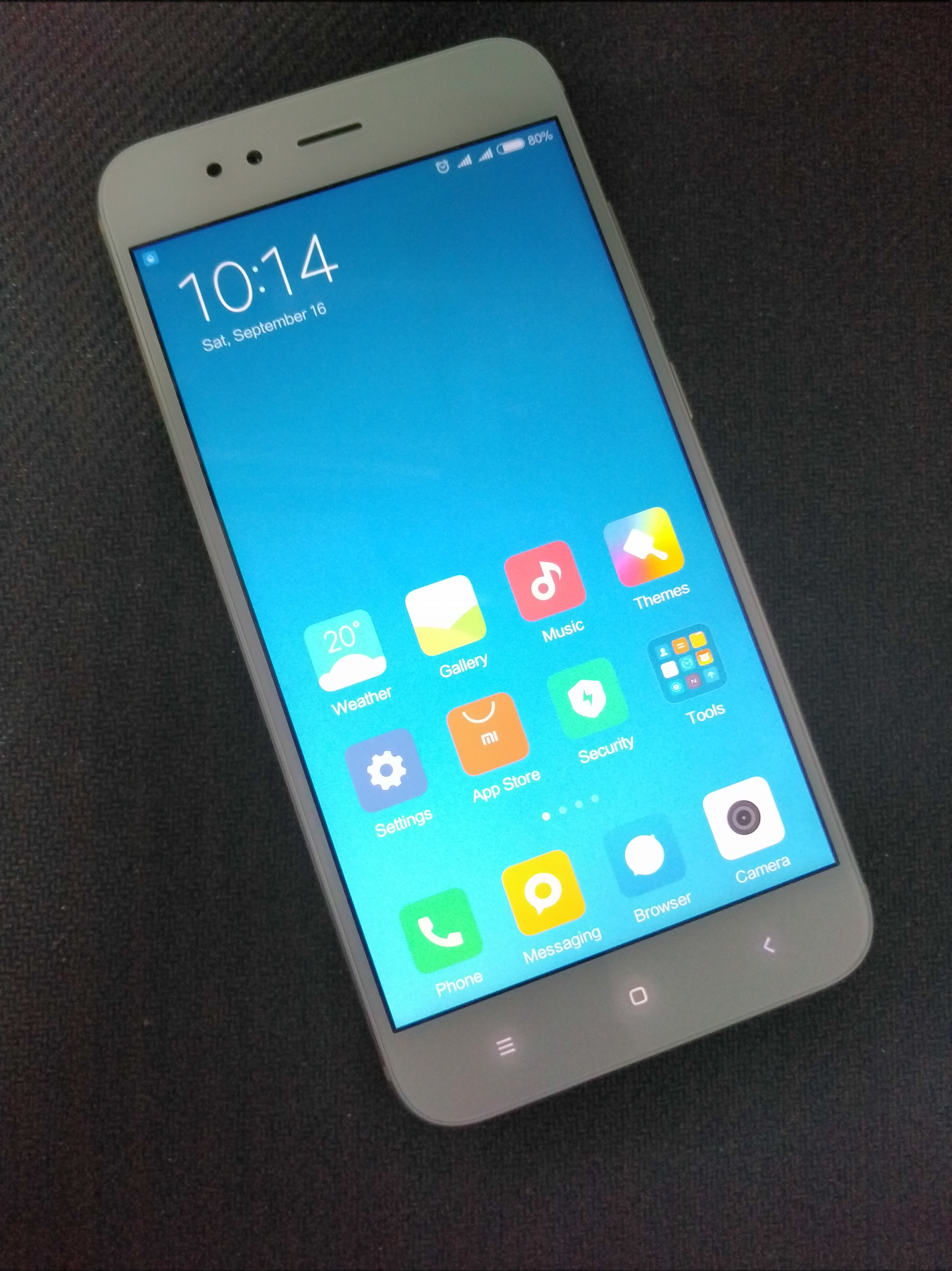
- Mi A1
- Manufacturer: Xiaomi
- Type: Touchscreen smartphone
- Series: Mi, Android One
- First released: September 2017; 8 years ago
- Successor: Xiaomi Mi A2; Xiaomi Redmi 5 Plus
- Related: Xiaomi Redmi 4/4X/Note 4 Xiaomi Mi A2 Lite
- Compatible networks: GSM: 800/900/1800/1900; HSPA: 850 / 900 / 1700 (AWS) / 1900 / 2100; LTE:, VoLTE 1 (2100), 2 (1900), 3 (1800), 4 (1700/2100), 5 (850), 7 (2600), 8 (900), 38 (2600), 39 (1900), 40 (2300), 41 (2500)
- Form factor: Slate
- Dimensions: 155.4 mm (6.12 in) H; 75.8 mm (2.98 in) W; 7.3 mm (0.29 in) D
- Weight: 165 g (5.8 oz)
- Operating system: Android 7.1.2 "Nougat", upgradable to Android 8.1 "Oreo" and Android 9 "Pie".
- System-on-chip: Qualcomm MSM8953 Snapdragon 625
- CPU: Octa-core (8×2.0GHz Cortex-A53)
- GPU: Adreno 506
- Memory: 4 GB
- Storage: 32/64 GB
- Removable storage: microSD, up to 128 GB
- Battery: Non-removable Li-Ion 3080 mAh battery
- Rear camera: Dual 12 MP (26mm, f/2.2; 50mm, f/2.6), phase detection autofocus, 2× optical lossless zoom, dual-LED (dual tone) flash
- Front camera: 5 MP 1.25 μm/ 1.0 μm pixel size, geo-tagging, touch focus, face detection, HDR, panorama
- Display: 5.5 in (140 mm) LTPS LCD, 1080×1920 pixels, ~401 ppi, 16M colors
- Connectivity: Wi-Fi 802.11a/b/g/n/ac (2.4 & 5GHz), dual-band, WiFi Direct, hotspot; Bluetooth v4.1, A2DP, Low-energy; 4G/LTE; USB-C
- Codename: Tissot, Tiffany (Mi 5X)
- Website: www.mi.com/en/mi-a1/

The Xiaomi Mi A1 (also known as Xiaomi Mi 5X in China), is a smartphone, co-developed by Google, as part of its Android One initiative — and Xiaomi that runs on the Android operating system.

== Specifications ==
=== Hardware ===
The Mi A1 comes with a 5.5-inch touchscreen display with Full HD 1080p resolution, powered by a 3080 mAh battery. It measures 155.40 mm × 75.80 mm × 7.30 mm (height × width × thickness) and weighs 165.00 grams. The phone is powered by a 2.0 GHz Octa-core Qualcomm Snapdragon 625 processor with the 14 nm FinFET process with Adreno 506 650 MHz GPU, and comes with 4 GB of RAM. It 32 GB or 64 GB of internal storage, and unique for the series, microSD card slot (hybrid slot) supporting up to 128 GB cards. The rear camera on the Mi A1 is 12 MP 1.25 μm f/2.2 + 12 MP 1.0 μm, f/2.6 shooters with autofocus and 2× optical lossless zoom, two-tone flash and a 5-piece lens. It is capable of recording HD and 4k videos. The phone also has a 5 MP 1.12 μm, f/2 front camera. Sensors on the phone include: compass magnetometer, proximity sensor, accelerometer, ambient light sensor, gyroscope, fingerprint sensor, infrared, and Hall Sensor.

=== Software ===
The Xiaomi Mi A1 initially runs on Android 7.1.2 Nougat and is updatable to Android 9 Pie. Besides the Google's suite of applications, the device is preloaded with Xiaomi's applications such as Camera, Feedback, Mi Community and Mi Remote. The Mi A1 receives OS upgrades for a minimum of two years. The Android Oreo update does not bring a project Treble functionality for device-independent system updates. The device's kernel sources were released in January 2018, 4 months after its release.

=== Mi 5X ===
The Mi 5X is the Chinese market version of the Mi A1, running MIUI over Android. The 5X only differs in its software, having identical hardware to the A1.

== Release ==
The Xiaomi Mi A1 was unveiled on 5 September 2017 and was available in all of Xiaomi's markets at the time, with the exception of the People's Republic of China, where the MIUI based variant, Mi 5X, was released earlier that year.

Xiaomi Mi A1 availability
Asia Pacific	European Union	Rest of Europe	Middle East & Africa	America
Bangladesh	Austria	Belarus	Bahrain	Chile
Hong Kong	Bulgaria	Russia	Egypt	Colombia
India	Croatia	Serbia	Israel	Mexico
Indonesia	Cyprus	Ukraine	Kuwait	Uruguay
Kazakhstan	Czech Republic		Oman	
Malaysia	Finland		Qatar	
Myanmar	Germany		Saudi Arabia	
Nepal	Greece		South Africa	
Pakistan	Hungary		UAE	
Philippines	Italy		Yemen	
Singapore	Poland			
South Korea	Romania			
Sri Lanka	Slovakia			
Taiwan	Slovenia			
Thailand	Spain			
Vietnam				

== Reception ==
Sam Byford of The Verge described Mi A1's most distinct feature is its software that runs on stock Android and not on Xiaomi's MIUI layer. Sahil Gupta of TechRadar wrote that Mi A1's Android One certified experience along with tried and tested hardware, and dual camera capability gives you the premium feel under a budget.

The phone is described as 'giving a resurgence' to the Android One program, being the first Android One phone to be sold worldwide, and the first Android One phone made by a top-5 best-selling smartphone brand. It was also the first mid-range priced phone to feature a dual rear camera setup with a zoom lens.

== Issues ==
At the end of 2017, Android Oreo was released and created major battery draining issues on some devices. Another issue of Android Oreo was the instability of Wi-Fi connections.
