= Gionee =

Chinese smartphone company

- Type: Private
- Industry: Consumer electronics
- Founded: 16 September 2002; 24 years ago
- Founder: Liu Lirong
- Defunct: 10 December 2018; 7 years ago
- Fate: Bankruptcy (Indian unit acquired by Karbonn Mobiles in 2019)
- Headquarters: Shenzhen, Guangdong, China
- Products: Mobile phones, smart watches
- Parent: Karbonn
- Subsidiaries: IUNI

Gionee
- Simplified Chinese: 金立通信设备有限公司
- Traditional Chinese: 金立通信設備有限公司
- Literal meaning: Gionee Communication Equipment Co. Ltd.
Transcriptions
Standard Mandarin
- Hanyu Pinyin: Jīnlì Tōngxìn Shèbèi Yǒuxiàn Gōngsī

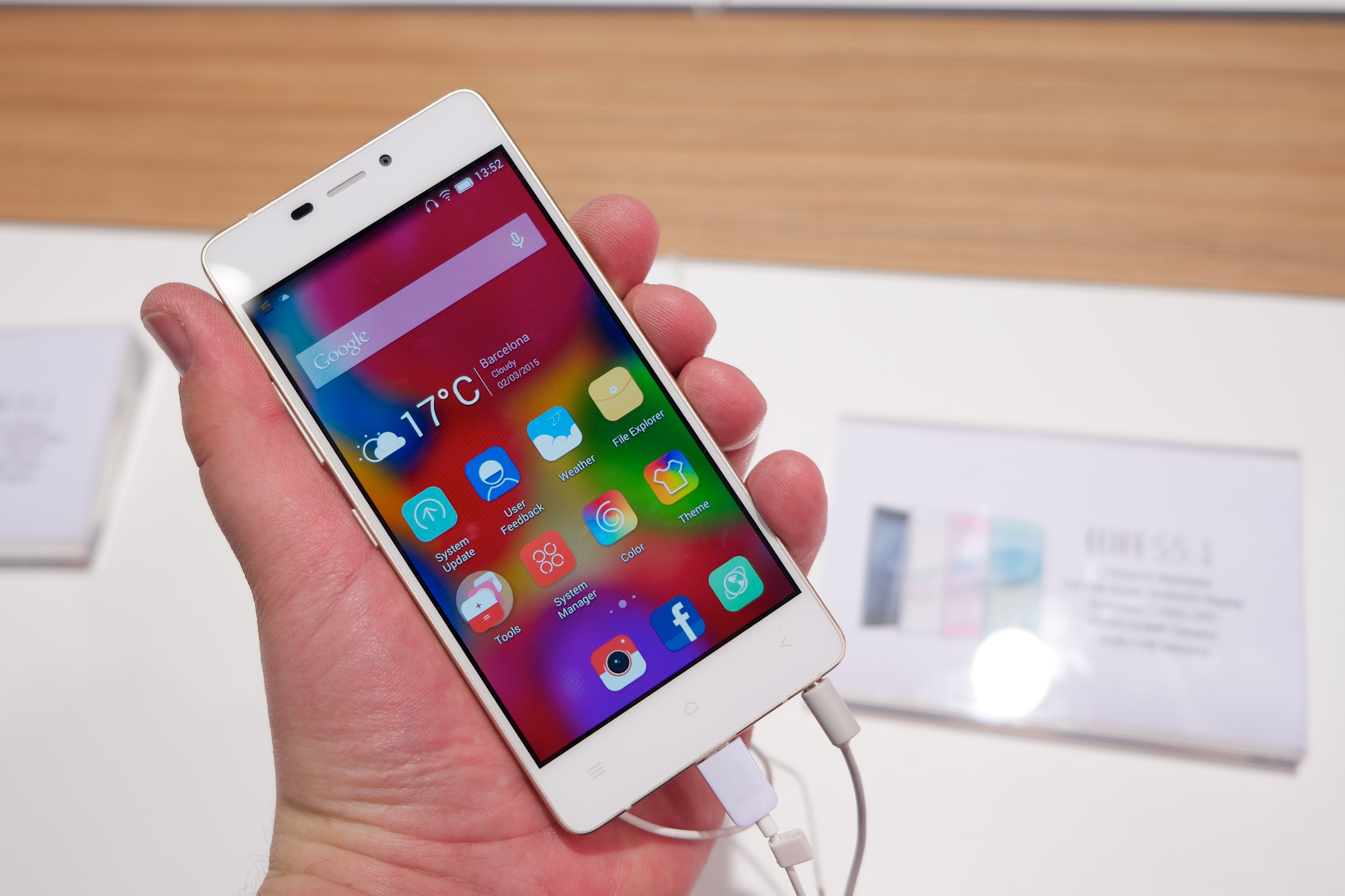
Gionee Elife S5.1 at Mobile World Congress 2015 Barcelona

Gionee (Chinese: 金立; pinyin: Jīnlì) was a Chinese smartphone manufacturer based in Shenzhen, Guangdong. Founded in 2002, it was one of China's largest mobile phone manufacturers. According to Gartner, its market share in China was 4.7% in 2012, and it expanded into other markets, including India, Taiwan, Bangladesh, Nigeria, Vietnam, Myanmar, Nepal, Thailand, the Philippines and Algeria.

== History ==
In August 2016, Gionee India introduced their plans to build a manufacturing plant in India. At the same time, Gionee introduced its first Made in India smartphone with the introduction of the F103 model. The model was manufactured in a Foxconn plant in Sri City, Andhra Pradesh. In November 2018, it was reported that chairman Liu Lirong lost over US$144 million to gambling in a casino. On 10 December 2018, the Shenzhen Intermediate People's Court accepted the bankruptcy liquidation application filed by Huaxing Bank against Gionee.

In 2019, Gionee India subsidiary was acquired by promoters of Karbonn Mobiles. In 2020, they would announced Gionee Mobile as a sub-brand of Karbonn. On 1 March 2021, Karbonn launched the Gionee Max Pro in India. The phone features a 6,000 mAh battery, a 6.52-inch display, 3 GB of RAM paired with 32 GB inbuilt storage and can be expanded via microSD card.

== Controversies ==
In 2014, it was shown by the German media that Gionee was delivering smartphones and tablets with pre-installed malware.
