= Karbonn Mobiles =

Indian multinational technology company

Karbonn
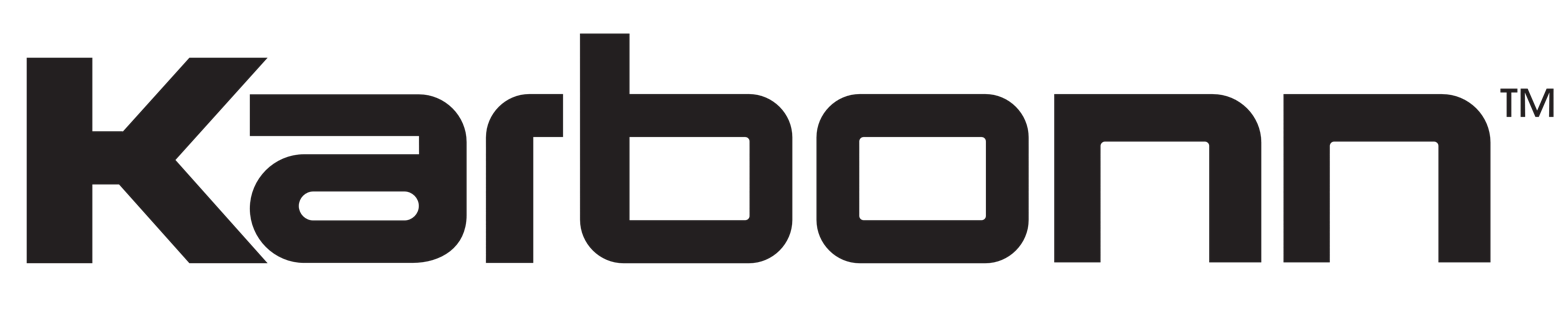

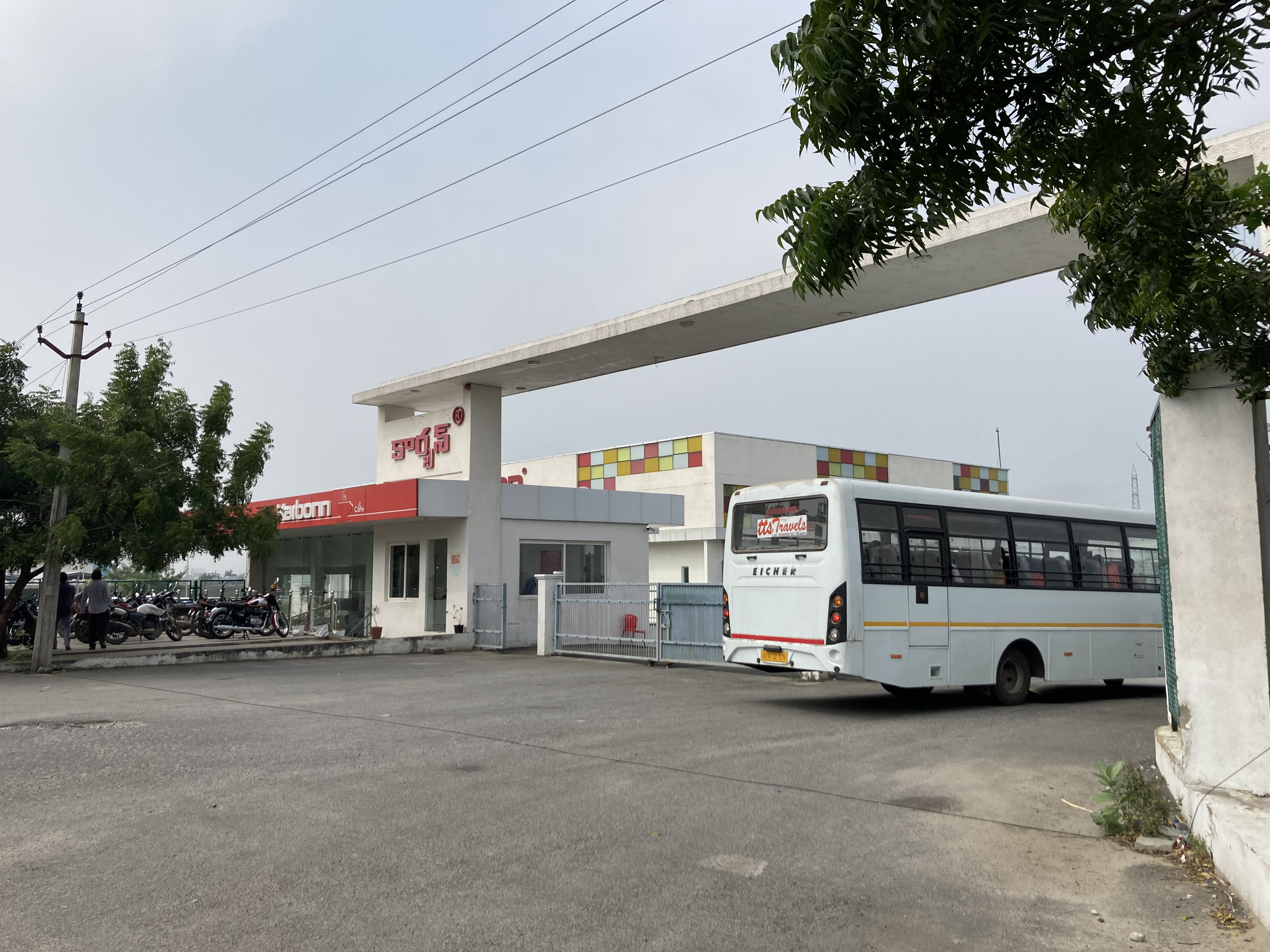
- Karbonn mobile manufacturing plant at Tirupati, India
- Type: Private
- Industry: Technology; Electronics; Consumer electronics; Home appliances; Smartphones
- Founded: March 2009; 17 years ago
- Founder: Sudhir Hasija; Pardeep Jain
- Headquarters: Delhi, India
- Area served: Worldwide
- Key people: Pardeep Jain (MD & Director); Shashin Devsare (Executive Director); Alok Kumar (General Manager Marketing)
- Products: Mobile phones; Smartphones; Tablets; Smart watches; Smart TV
- Services: Electronics manufacturing services
- Revenue: ▲₹650 crore (US$69 million)
- Number of employees: 10,000+
- Parent: Jaina Group and UTL Group
- Subsidiaries: Gionee
- Website: karbonnr-bel.com

Karbonn (known as Karbonn Smart) is an Indian multinational technology company, that manufactures feature phones, smartphones, tablets and mobile phone accessories. The company was founded in March 2009, headquartered in Delhi, India. Karbonn is a joint venture between United Telelinks Ltd., a Bangalore-based firm and Jaina Marketing Pvt. Ltd., headquartered in New Delhi.

Karbonn Mobiles also has tie ups with leading telecom players like Airtel, Vodafone Idea and Jio. Karbonn operates in countries such as Bangladesh, Nepal, Sri Lanka, UAE, Oman, Saudi Arabia, Qatar, Bahrain, Yemen, United Kingdom and parts of Europe.

== History ==
The company struck a deal with Eros International, the makers of the Rajinikanth-starrer film Kochadaiyaan (2013). The deal involved the manufacture of five lakh (500,000) items of Kochadaiyaan merchandise with screen savers and images from the film, the trailer, behind-the-scenes shots, the signature tune of the film, and the lead actor's signature on the back cover of phones.

Karbonn ties with online digital entertainment service provider Hungama.com and has an app preinstalled.

In October 2012, Karbonn announced the launch of their brand extension 'Karbonn Smart'. The range included a smart tab and smartphones based on the Android operating system. In February 2014, Microsoft announced Karbonn as a hardware partner of the Windows Phone operating system.

Karbonn Sparkle V is one of the initial Android One phones manufactured by Karbonn Mobiles in cooperation with Google Inc.

== Brand ==
Karbonn was ranked the 77th most trusted brand in India among 1,200, by The Brand Trust Report 2014, a study conducted by brand analytics company Trust Research Advisory. In the 2017 edition of the report, it stands at the 350th position among 1,000 Indian companies surveyed.

Karbonn is the first Android One phone to be sold in Europe : Karbonn Sparkle V2. The company entered the UK market through Amazon.co.uk

In 2019, Gionee's Indian subsidiary was acquired by the promoters of Karbonn. In 2020 they announced Gionee Mobile as a sub-brand of Karbonn.

In March 2022, Karbonn announced that it would undergo liquidation as the company has been facing a severe revenue decline due to the pandemic.

In 2026, Karbonn re-entered the smartphone market with its new "REBEL" sub-brand.

== Revenue ==
The firm's total investment in the Indian consumer market was over US$5 million in the year 2011. The firm contracted with semiconductor companies for their handsets and mainly targeted the Indian market. The firm has over 85,000 retailers and 1000+ service centers (150+ dedicated exclusively for Karbonn) across India. Karbonn Mobiles aims at registering a turnover of ₹4,000 crore during the 2013-14 financial year.

== See also ==
- List of mobile phone brands by country
- List of companies of India
- Lava International
- Intex Technologies
- Micromax Informatics
