= Android One =

Line of smartphones that run the unmodified Android operating system

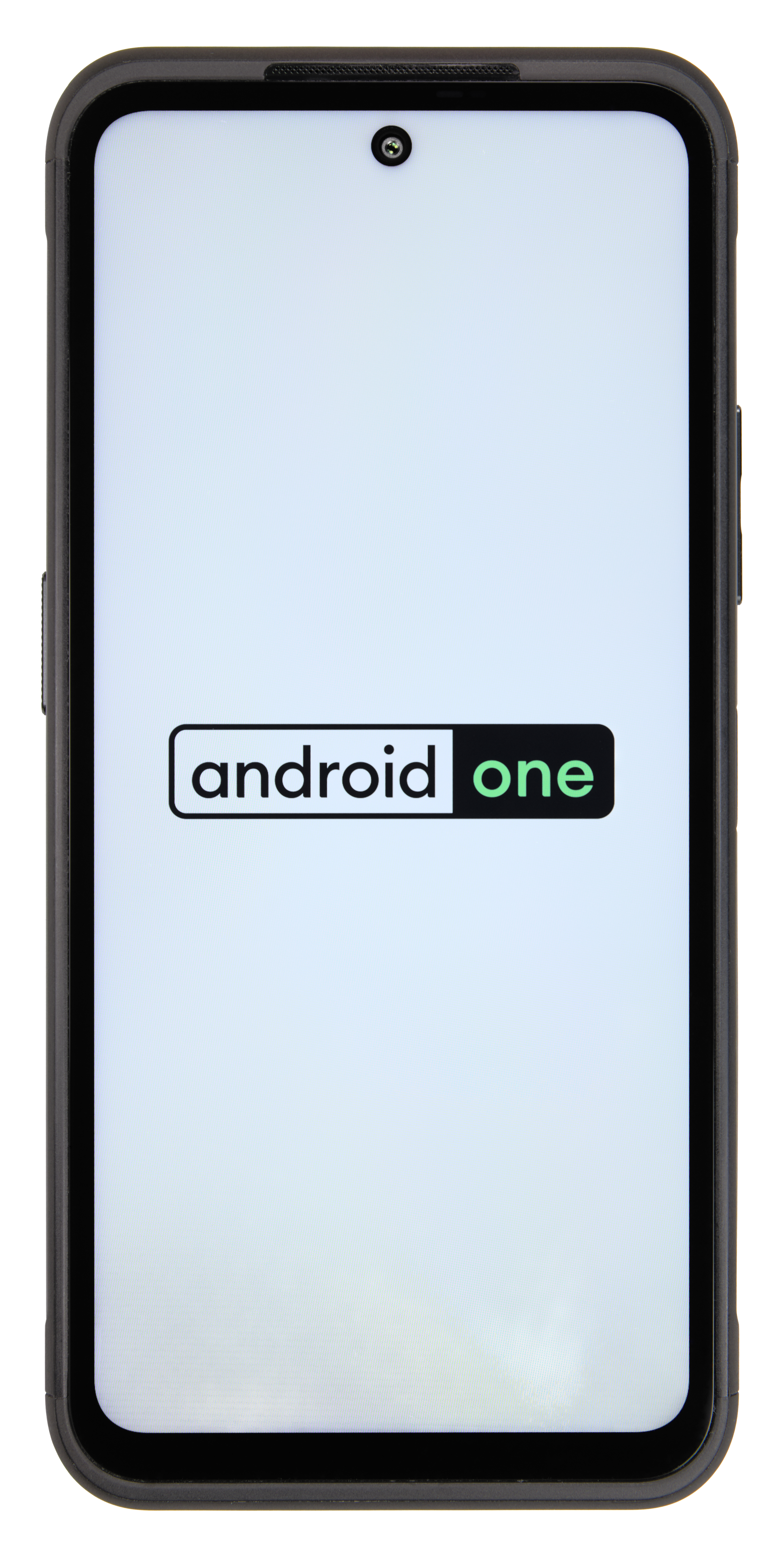
- A Nokia XR20 that shows the logo of Android One on startup
- Developer: Google and OEMs
- Manufacturer: Worldwide manufacturers
- Type: Smartphones
- Lifespan: September 2014–2023
- Operating system: Android
- Website: www.android.com/one/

Android One was a family of third-party Android-based smartphones promoted by Google. In comparison to many third-party Android devices, which ship with a manufacturer's customized user interface and bundled apps, these devices run near-stock versions of Android with limited modifications, and a focus on Google services (although they may still feature software enhancements to support the features of included hardware, such as cameras). Devices that run Android One receive OS updates for at least two years after their release, and security patches for at least three years.

The Android One program began in 2014, and was first positioned as a reference platform for low-end devices targeting emerging markets such as India. A goal of the program was to accelerate the availability of newer versions of Android on such devices. In the years that followed, the Android One program expanded to target more territories and global releases, and to include mid-range and high-end devices as well. As of December 2018, there were over 100 Android One smartphone models.

Android One has been considered a successor to the former Google Play Edition and Nexus programs, which similarly featured third-party devices co-developed or vetted by Google, with stock Android and quicker releases of updates. The Google Pixel replaced Nexus as a first-party brand of flagship Android devices manufactured by Google; although they do run a stock Android interface, they still contain exclusive software features that are not always made available to the stock Android source code or third-party devices.

== History ==
Android One was started by Sundar Pichai, former product chief and current CEO of Google. Before Android One, it often took at least a year before the latest Android update arrived on non-Google devices. The project was targeted at the Indian market for low-tier devices. Pichai said that the initial set of devices shared common hardware because they were based on the reference platform, but an increasing range of devices were to be launched in the future. Security and system updates were handled by Google for the first set of Android One devices, which featured MediaTek's quad-core MT6582 Mobile System-on-Chip (Mobile SoC).

In 2014, Android One phones initially rolled out in India, Pakistan, Bangladesh, Nepal, Indonesia, the Philippines, Sri Lanka, Myanmar and other South Asian countries. The first Android One smartphones were by the Indian brands Micromax, Spice and Karbonn in September 2014, the second generation Android One smartphones were by Indonesia brands Mito Impact, Evercoss One X, Nexian journey in February 2015 and the first Android One preinstalled with Android 5.0 Lollipop. Other manufacturers including QMobile have launched an Android One device named QMobile A1, on 6 July 2015, in Pakistan. Android One launched in Nigeria in August 2015 with the Infinix Hot 2 X510 (1 and 2 GB RAM version) and became the first Android One in Africa. Infinix Hot 2 X510 was also exported to other African countries such as Egypt, Ghana, Ivory Coast, Morocco, Kenya, Cameroon, Uganda, and also Asian countries such as United Arab Emirates, Pakistan and Indonesia (2 GB RAM version only). Other manufactures are to follow gradually.

In 2016, SoftBank announced they would be the first carrier in Japan to introduce an Android One phone in the country, namely the Sharp 507SH which was released in late July 2016.

On 25 May 2017, Turkish smartphone brand "General Mobile" released the next addition to their fully committed portfolio of Android One phones, the GM 6. SoftBank soon followed by introducing the Sharp X1 in Japan through its subsidiary telecommunications company, Y!Mobile, on June 30.

On 5 September 2017, Android One and Xiaomi jointly announced the Xiaomi Mi A1 as the first Android One device to be released globally in over 36 markets. In September 2017, MVNO Google Fi introduced the first Android One device available in the U.S. with the Android One Moto X4. In November 2017, Android One entered the German market with HTC with the U11 Life.

At the end of November 2017, SoftBank announced the addition of four new devices to its Android One lineup with Y!Mobile: the X2 (HTC), X3 (Kyocera), S3 (Sharp), and S4 (Kyocera).

In February 2018, HMD Global, the maker of Nokia smartphones, announced that it had joined the Android One program. Nokia 6.1, Nokia 7 Plus, and Nokia 8 Sirocco were among the first batch of Android One phones from HMD.

In 2020, Xiaomi discontinued its only Android One lineup, the Xiaomi Mi A series, ending with the Xiaomi Mi A3.

== Features ==
Devices are approved by Google, and original equipment manufacturers (OEMs) agree to these requirements:

- Has Android OS updates for two years.
- Has regular security patch updates for three years.
- Has stock Android UI.
- Google services intact.

Android One has these features:

- Minimal amount of bloatware.
- Android One phones prioritize background activity for the most important apps to reduce power usage. In addition, its lower memory footprint is also suited for entry-level smartphones with 3 GB of RAM or less, as well as those with slower processors.
- "Google Search Bar" widget on the home screen is unremovable. However a user can change its position and theme.

=== OS and security updates ===
Concerning Android operating system (OS) and security updates the official Android One entry page says (in the fine print at the end of it): "Confirm exact duration of support for phones in your territory with smartphone manufacturer. Monthly security updates to be supported for at least three years after initial phone release."

A Google blog article from 22 February 2018, says: "Faster access to Android OS updates for two years, including the latest AI innovations from Google; Amongst the most secure devices in the ecosystem with regular security updates for three years and Google Play Protect built in".

In December 2018 Google stated: "We confirm that our promise to provide 2 years of updates on Android One devices still stands and our website design does not impact the promise of this program."

== Products by year of announcement or release ==
Android One continues to expand its line of smartphones and geographic availability through OEM and carrier partnerships.

Countries of release are likely to expand beyond the initial countries and regions listed below.

=== 2023 ===
OEM, Model	Country	SoC	Year, month	Screen size. Screen- to-body ratio	Details
Kyocera Android One S10	Japan	MediaTek Dimensity 700	2023-01	6.1" ~82.0%	TFT LCD, 2400*1080 (1080p resolution). 64 GB, 4 GB RAM. Android 13. 16 MP (wide) + 16 MP (ultrawide) rear, 8 MP front. Single SIM and eSIM, locked to YMobile. 4380 mAh. 169 g (5.96 oz).

=== 2022 ===
OEM, Model	Country	SoC	Year, month	Screen size. Screen- to-body ratio	Details
Nokia X30	Worldwide	Qualcomm Snapdragon 695 5G	2022-09	6.43" ~85.0%	AMOLED, ~409 ppi, 20:9 ratio. 128 or 256 GB, 6 or 8 GB RAM. 50 MP (wide) + 13 MP (ultrawide) rear, 16 MP front. Single or Dual SIM (dual stand-by) and eSIM. 4200 mAh. September 2022 release. 185 g (6.53 oz).
Nokia G60	Worldwide	Qualcomm Snapdragon 695 5G	2022-09	6.58" ~82.8%	IPS, ~401 ppi, 20:9 ratio. 64 or 128 GB, 4 or 6 GB RAM. 50 MP (wide) + 5 MP (ultrawide) + 2 MP (depth) rear, 8 MP front. Single or Dual SIM (dual stand-by) and eSIM. 4500 mAh. September 2022 release. 190 g (6.70 oz).
Nokia G11 Plus	Worldwide	Unisoc T606	2022-07	6.52" ~82.1%	IPS, ~269 ppi, 20:9 ratio. 32 or 64 GB, 3 or 4 GB RAM. 50 MP (wide) + 2 MP (depth) rear, 8 MP front. Single or Dual SIM (dual stand-by). 5000 mAh. July 2022 release. 192 g (6.77 oz).
Nokia G11	Worldwide	Unisoc T606	2022-03	6.5" ~81.6%	IPS, ~270 ppi, 20:9 ratio. 32 or 64 GB, 3 or 4 GB RAM. 13 MP (wide) + 2 × 2 MP (macro & depth) rear, 8 MP front. Single or Dual SIM (dual stand-by). 5050 mAh. March 2022 release. 189 g (6.67 oz).
Kyocera Android One S9	Japan	Qualcomm Snapdragon 480 5G	2022-03	6.1" ~82.0%	TFT LCD, 2400*1080 (1080p resolution). 64 GB, 4 GB RAM. Android 13. 16 MP (wide) + 16 MP (ultrawide) rear, 8 MP front. Single SIM and eSIM, locked to YMobile. 4500 mAh. 166 g (5.86 oz).
Nokia G21	Worldwide	Unisoc T606	2022-02	6.5" ~81.6%	IPS, ~270 ppi, 20:9 ratio. 64 or 128 GB, 3 or 4 or 6 GB RAM. 50 MP (wide) + 2 × 2 MP (macro & depth) rear, 8 MP front. Single or Dual SIM (dual stand-by). 5050 mAh. February 2022 release. 190 g (6.70 oz).

=== 2021 ===
OEM, Model	Country	SoC	Year, month	Screen size. Screen- to-body ratio	Details
Nokia G50	Worldwide	Qualcomm Snapdragon 480 5G	2021-10	6.82" ~84.5%	IPS, ~252 ppi, 19.5:9 ratio. 64 or 128 GB, 4 or 6 GB RAM. 48 MP (wide) + 5 MP (ultrawide) + 2 MP (depth) rear, 8 MP front. Single or Dual SIM (dual stand-by). 5000 mAh. October 2021 release. 220 g (7.76 oz).
Nokia XR20	Worldwide	Qualcomm Snapdragon 480 5G	2021-08	6.67" ~76.8%	IPS, ~395 ppi, 20:9 ratio. 64 or 128 GB, 4 or 6 GB RAM. 48 MP (wide) + 13 MP (ultrawide) rear, 8 MP front. Single or Dual SIM (dual stand-by). 4630 mAh. August 2021 release. 248 g (8.75 oz).
Nokia X10	Worldwide	Qualcomm Snapdragon 480 5G	2021-06	6.67"; ~79.8%	IPS, ~395 ppi, 20:9 ratio. 64 or 128 GB, 6 or 8 GB RAM. 48 MP (wide) + 5 MP (ultrawide) + 2 × 2 MP (macro & depth) rear, 8 MP front. Single or Dual SIM (dual stand-by). 4470 mAh. June 2021 release. 210 g (7.41 oz).
Nokia G20	Worldwide	Mediatek Helio G35	2021-05	6.52" ~81.9%	IPS, ~269 ppi, 20:9 ratio. 64 or 128 GB, 4 GB RAM. 48 MP (wide) + 5 MP (ultrawide) + 2 × 2 MP (macro & depth) rear, 8 MP front. Single or Dual SIM (dual stand-by). 5050 mAh. May 2021 release. 197 g (6.95 oz).
Nokia X20	Worldwide	Qualcomm Snapdragon 480 5G	2021-05	6.67"; ~79.8%	IPS, ~395 ppi, 20:9 ratio. 128 GB, 6 or 8 GB RAM. 64 MP (wide) + 5 MP (ultrawide) + 2 × 2 MP (macro & depth) rear, 32 MP front. Single or Dual SIM (dual stand-by). 4470 mAh. May 2021 release. 220 g (7.76 oz).
Nokia G10	Worldwide	Mediatek Helio G25	2021-04	6.52"; ~81.9%	IPS, ~269 ppi, 20:9 ratio. 32 or 64 GB, 3 or 4 GB RAM. 13 MP (wide) + 2 × 2 MP (macro & depth) rear, 8 MP front. Single or Dual SIM (dual stand-by). 5050 mAh. April 2021 release. 194 g (6.64 oz).

=== 2020 ===
OEM, Model	Country	SoC	Year, month	Screen size. Screen- to-body ratio	Details
Nokia 5.4	Worldwide	Qualcomm Snapdragon 662	2020-12	6.39"; 103.6 cm^{2} ~81.9%	IPS, ~269 ppi, 13:6 ratio. 64 or 128 GB, 4 or 6 GB RAM. 48 MP (wide) + 5 MP (ultrawide) + 2 × 2 MP (macro & depth) rear, 16 MP front. Single or Dual SIM (dual stand-by). 4000 mAh. Dec 25 2020 release. 181 g (6.38 oz).
Nokia 3.4	Worldwide	Qualcomm Snapdragon 460	2020-10	6.39" 100.2 cm^{2} ~81.9%	IPS, ~269 ppi, 13:6 ratio. 32 or 64 GB, 3 GB or 4 GB RAM. 13 MP (wide) + 5 MP (ultrawide) + 2 MP (depth) rear, 8 MP front. Dual SIM (excluding Latin America and USA) (dual stand-by) or single SIM. 4000 mAh. Oct 2020 release. 180 g (6.35 oz).
Nokia 2.4	Worldwide	Mediatek Helio P22	2020-09	6.5" 102.0 cm^{2} ~80.6%	IPS, ~270 ppi, 20:9 ratio. 32 or 64 GB, 2 GB or 3 GB RAM. 13 + 2 MP rear, 5 MP front. Dual SIM (dual stand-by). 4500 mAh. Sep 2020 release. 189 g (6.88 oz).
Nokia 8.3 5G	Worldwide	Qualcomm Snapdragon 765G	2020-09	6.81"; 112 cm^{2} ~82.9%	IPS, ~386 ppi, 20:9 ratio. 64 or 128 GB, 6 or 8 GB RAM. 64 MP (wide) + 12 MP (ultrawide) + 2 × 2 MP (macro & depth) rear, 24 MP front. Single or Dual SIM (dual stand-by). 4500 mAh. Sep 2020 release. 220 g (7.76 oz).
Moto G Pro	Europe	Qualcomm Snapdragon 665	2020-06	6.4"; 100.7 cm^{2} ~83.7%	IPS, ~399 ppi, 32:15 ratio. 128 GB, 4 GB RAM. 48 MP (wide) + 16 MP (ultrawide) + 2 MP (macro) rear, 16 MP front. Dual SIM (dual stand-by). 4000 mAh. June 2020 release. 192 g (6.77 oz).
Nokia 5.3	Worldwide	Qualcomm Snapdragon 665	2020-04	6.65"; 103.6 cm^{2} ~82.3%	IPS, ~268 ppi, 20:9 ratio. 64 GB, 3 or 4 or 6 GB RAM. 13 MP (wide) + 5 MP (ultrawide) + 2 × 2 MP (macro & depth) rear, 8 MP front. Single or Dual SIM (dual stand-by). 4000 mAh. April 2020 release. 185 g (7.76 oz).

=== 2019 ===
OEM, Model	Country	SoC	Year, month	Screen size. Screen- to-body ratio	Details
Nokia 2.3	Worldwide	MediaTek Helio A22	2019-12	6.2"; 95.9 cm^{2} ~80.7%	IPS, ~271 ppi, 19:9 ratio. 32 GB, 2 GB RAM. 13 + 2 MP rear, 5 MP front. Single or Dual SIM (dual stand-by). 4000 mAh. Dec 2019 release. 183 g (6.46 oz).
Sharp; S7	Starts in Japan	Snapdragon 630	2019-12	5.5" 87.7 cm^{2} ~85.2%	IGZO, ~439 ppi, 2:1 ratio. 32/128 GB, 3 GB RAM. 12 MP rear, 8 MP front. Single SIM (Nano-SIM). 4000 mAh. Dec 2019 release. 167 g (5.89 oz).
Mara; Z	Starts in Rwanda	Snapdragon 435	2019-10	5.7" 83.84 cm^{2} ~74.79%	IPS, ~282 ppi, 2:1 ratio. 32 GB, 3 GB RAM. 13 MP rear, 13 MP front. Single SIM (Nano-SIM) or Dual SIM (dual stand-by). 3075 mAh. Oct 2019 release. 152 g (5.36 oz).
Nokia; 6.2	Worldwide	Snapdragon 636	2019-10	6.3"; 99.1 cm^{2} ~82.5%	IPS, ~400 ppi, 19:9 ratio. 32/64/128 GB, 3/4 GB RAM. 16+8+5 MP rear, 8 MP front. Single SIM (Nano-SIM) or Dual SIM (dual stand-by). 3500 mAh. Oct 2019 release. 180 g (6.35 oz).
Nokia; 7.2	Worldwide	Snapdragon 660	2019-09	6.3"; 99.1 cm^{2} ~82.5%	IPS, ~400 ppi, 19:9 ratio. 64/128 GB, 4/6 GB RAM. 48+8+5 MP rear, 20 MP front. Single SIM (Nano-SIM) or Dual SIM (dual stand-by). 3500 mAh. Sep 2019 release. 180 g (6.35 oz).
Motorola; One; Action	Worldwide	Exynos 9609	2019-08	6.3"; 94.0 cm^{2} ~82.5%	IPS, ~432 ppi, 21:9 ratio. 128 GB, 4 GB RAM. Wide 12 MP rear (portrait) and Ultrawide 16 MP rear (landscape), Wide 12 MP front. Single or hybrid Dual SIM (dual stand-by). 3500 mAh. Aug 2019 release. 176 g (6.21 oz).
Xiaomi; Mi A3	Worldwide	Snapdragon 665	2019-07	6.08"; 88.7 cm^{2} ~80.3%	AMOLED, ~286 ppi, 13:6 ratio. 64/128 GB, 4 GB RAM. 32 MP front, triple rear camera (48/8/2 MP). Dual SIM (dual stand-by). 4030 mAh. July 2019 release. 173.8 g (6.14 oz).
Nokia; 3.2	Worldwide	Snapdragon 429	2019-06	6.26"; 97.8 cm^{2} ~80.5%	IPS, ~269 ppi, 19:9 ratio. 32 GB, 3 GB RAM or 16 GB, 2 GB RAM. 13 MP rear, 5 MP front. Dual SIM (dual stand-by). 4000 mAh. June 2019 release. 181 g (6.38 oz).
Nokia; 2.2	Worldwide	MediaTek Helio A22	2019-06	5.71"; 81.4 cm^{2} ~79.0%	IPS, ~295 ppi, 19:9 ratio. 32 GB, 3 GB RAM or 16 GB, 2 GB RAM. 13 MP rear, 5 MP front. Single or Dual SIM (dual stand-by). 3000 mAh. June 2019 release. 153 g (5.40 oz).
Nokia; 4.2	Worldwide	Snapdragon 439	2019-05	5.71"; 81.4 cm^{2} ~76.6%	IPS, ~295 ppi, 19:9 ratio. 32 GB, 3 GB RAM or 16 GB, 2 GB RAM. 13+2 MP rear, 8 MP front. Dual SIM (dual stand-by). 3000 mAh. May 2019 release. 161 g (5.68 oz).
Motorola; One; Vision	Selected countries	Exynos 9609	2019-05	6.3"; 94.0 cm^{2} ~82.5%	IPS, ~432 ppi, 21:9 ratio. 128 GB, 4 GB RAM. 48 MP rear, 25 MP front. Optical image stabilization (OIS). Single or hybrid Dual SIM (dual stand-by). 3500 mAh. May 2019 release. 180 g (6.35 oz). The first Android One smartphone to use SoC from Samsung instead of Qualcomm and MediaTek.
Nokia; X71	Worldwide	Snapdragon 660	2019-04	6.39″ 100.9 cm2 ~83.9%	IPS, ~400 ppi, 19:9 ratio. 128 GB, 6 GB RAM. 48+8+5 MP rear, 16 MP front. Dual SIM (dual stand-by). 3500 mAh. April 2019 release. 180 g (6.35 oz).
Nokia; 9 PureView		Snapdragon 845	2019-02	5.99"; 92.6 cm^{2} ~79.7%	P-OLED, ~538 ppi, 2:1 ratio. 128 GB, 6 GB RAM. 5x12 MP rear, 20 MP front. Time-of-flight camera. Single or hybrid Dual SIM (dual stand-by). 3320 mAh. Feb 2019 release. 172 g (6.07 oz).
Sharp S5			2019-01		

=== 2018 ===
OEM, Model	Country	SoC	Year, month	Screen size. Screen- to-body ratio	Details
Nokia; 8.1	Worldwide	Snapdragon 710	2018-12	6.18"; 95.3 cm^{2} ~81.2%	IPS, ~408 ppi, 19:9 ratio. 4/6 GB RAM. 64/128 GB storage. 13+12 MP rear, 12 MP front. Optical image stabilization (OIS). Rear fingerprint reader. NFC. 3500 MAh. Dec 2018 release.
Motorola; One; Power	Worldwide	Snapdragon 636	2018-10	6.2"; 96.4 cm^{2} ~81.3%	IPS, ~403 ppi, 18.7:9 ratio. 3/4/6 GB RAM, 64 GB storage. 16+5 MP rear, 12 MP front. Single or Dual SIM (dual stand-by). 5000 mAh. Oct 2018 release.
Nokia; 3.1 Plus	Worldwide	Mediatek MT6762 Helio P22	2018-10	6.0"; 92.9 cm^{2} ~77.5%	IPS, ~268 ppi, 2:1 ratio. 2/3/4 GB RAM 16/32 GB storage. 13+5 MP rear, 8 MP front. Hybrid Dual SIM (dual stand-by). 3500 mAh. Oct 2018 release.
Nokia; 7.1	Worldwide	Snapdragon 636	2018-10	5.84"; 85.1 cm^{2} ~79.9%	IPS, ~432 ppi, 19:9 ratio. 64 GB, 4 GB RAM or 32 GB, 3 GB RAM. 12 MP rear, 5 MP front. Single or hybrid Dual SIM (dual stand-by). 3060 mAh. Oct 2018 release.
Motorola; One	Worldwide	Snapdragon 625	2018-10	5.9"; 85.7 cm^{2} ~79.2%	IPS, ~287 ppi, 19:9 ratio. 64 GB, 4 GB RAM. 13+2 MP rear, 8 MP front. Single or Dual SIM (dual stand-by). 3000 mAh. Oct 2018 release.
LG G7 One	Canada	Snapdragon 835	2018-10	6.1"; 91.3 cm^{2} ~82.9%	IPS, ~563 ppi, 13:6 ratio. 32 GB, 4 GB RAM or 64 GB (Korea only). 16 MP rear, 8 MP front. Optical image stabilization (OIS). Single or Dual SIM (dual stand-by). 3000 mAh. Oct 2018 release.
General Mobile GM 9 Pro	Selected countries	Snapdragon 660	2018-09	6.01" 93.2 cm^{2} ~77.3%	AMOLED, ~402 ppi, 2:1 ratio. 64 GB, 4 GB RAM. 12+8 MP rear, 8 MP front. Single or Dual SIM (dual stand-by). 3800 mAh. Sep 2018 release.
Nokia; 5.1	Worldwide	MediaTek Helio P18	2018-08	5.5"; 78.1 cm^{2} ~73.1%	IPS, ~439 ppi, 2:1 ratio. 32 GB, 3 GB RAM or 16 GB, 2 GB RAM. 16 MP rear, 8 MP front. Dual SIM (dual stand-by). 2970 mAh. Aug 2018 release.
Nokia; 6.1 Plus	Worldwide	Snapdragon 636	2018-08	5.8"; 85.1 cm^{2} ~81.5%	IPS, ~432 ppi, 19:9 ratio. 64 GB, 4/6 GB RAM. 16+5 MP rear, 16 MP front. Hybrid Dual SIM (dual stand-by). 3060 mAh. Aug 2018 release.
Infinix Note 5	Selected countries	Mediatek MT6763 Helio P23	2018-08	6.0"; 92.9 cm^{2} ~78.4%	LTPS IPS, ~402 ppi, 2:1 ratio. 64 GB, 4 GB RAM or 32 GB, 3 GB RAM. 12 MP rear, 16 MP front. Dual SIM (dual stand-by). 4500 mAh. Aug 2018 release.
Xiaomi; Mi A2	Worldwide	Snapdragon 660	2018-07	5.99"; 92.6 cm^{2} ~77.4%	LTPS IPS, ~403 ppi, 2:1 ratio. 128 GB, 6 GB RAM or 32/64 GB, 4 GB RAM. 12+20 MP rear, 20 MP front. Dual SIM (dual stand-by). Same hardware as Mi 6X (MIUI version); 3000 mAh. July 2018 release.
Xiaomi; Mi A2 Lite	Worldwide	Snapdragon 625	2018-07	5.84"; 85.1 cm^{2} ~79.5%	IPS, ~432 ppi, 19:9 ratio. 64 GB, 4 GB RAM or 32 GB, 3 GB RAM. 12+5 MP rear, 5 MP front. Same hardware as Redmi 6 Pro (MIUI version). Dual SIM (dual stand-by). 4000 mAh. July 2018 release.
Nokia; 5.1 Plus	Worldwide	Mediatek MT6771 Helio P60	2018-07	5.86"; 85.7 cm^{2} ~79.6%	IPS, ~287 ppi, 19:9 ratio. 64 GB, 4/6 GB RAM or 32 GB, 3 GB RAM. 13+5 MP rear, 8 MP front. Dual SIM (dual stand-by). 3060 mAh. July 2018 release.
Sharp; X4	Japan	Snapdragon 630	2018-06	5.5"; 78.1 cm^{2} ~73.1%	IGZO, 439 ppi, 2:1 ratio. 32 GB, 3 GB RAM. 16 MP rear, 8 MP front. Single SIM. 3100 mAh. June 2018 release.
BQ; Aquaris X2 Pro	Europe	Snapdragon 660	2018-06	5.65"; 82.4 cm^{2} ~75.6%	LTPS IPS, ~427 ppi, 2:1 ratio. 128 GB, 6 GB RAM or 64 GB, 4 GB RAM. 12+5 MP rear, 8 MP front. Hybrid Dual SIM (dual stand-by). 3100 mAh. June 2018 release.
BQ; Aquaris X2	Europe	Snapdragon 636	2018-06	5.65"; 82.4 cm^{2} ~75.6%	LTPS IPS, ~427 ppi, 2:1 ratio. 64 GB, 4 GB RAM or 32 GB, 3 GB RAM. 12+5 MP rear, 8 MP front. Hybrid Dual SIM (dual stand-by). June 2018 release.
Nokia; 3.1	Worldwide	MediaTek 6750	2018-05	5.2"; 69.8 cm^{2} ~69.4%	IPS, ~310 ppi, 2:1 ratio. 32 GB, 3 GB RAM. Or 16 GB, 2 GB RAM. 13 MP rear, 8 MP front. Dual SIM (dual stand-by). 2990 mAh. May 2018 release.
Nokia; 6.1	Worldwide	Snapdragon 630	2018-04	5.5"; 82.6 cm^{2} ~73.2%	IPS, ~403 ppi, 16:9 ratio. 32/64 GB, 3/4 GB RAM. 16 MP rear, 8 MP front. Hybrid Dual SIM (dual stand-by). 3000 mAh. April 2018 release.
Nokia; 8 Sirocco	Worldwide	Snapdragon 835	2018-04	5.5"; 83.4 cm^{2} ~81.1%	P-OLED, ~534 ppi, 16:9 ratio. 128 GB, 6 GB RAM. 12+13 MP rear, 5 MP front. Single or Dual SIM (dual stand-by). 3260 mAh. April 2018 release.
Nokia; 7 Plus	Worldwide	Snapdragon 660	2018-03	6.0"; 92.4 cm^{2} ~77.2%	IPS, ~403 ppi, 2:1 ratio. 64 GB, 4 GB RAM. 12+13 MP rear, 16 MP front. Hybrid Dual SIM (dual stand-by). 3800 mAh. Mar 2018 release.
General Mobile GM 8	Selected countries	Snapdragon 435	2018-02	5.7"; 83.8 cm^{2} ~74.8%	IPS, 282 ppi, 2:1 ratio. 32 GB, 3 GB RAM. 13 MP rear, 5 MP front. Single or Dual SIM (dual stand-by). 3075 mAh. Feb 2018 release.
Sharp; S3	Japan	Snapdragon 430	2018-01	5"; 69.0 cm^{2} ~69.0%	IGZO, 441 ppi, 16:9 ratio. 32 GB, 3 GB RAM. 13 MP rear, 5 MP front. Single SIM. 2700 mAh. Jan 2018 release.

=== 2017 ===
OEM, Model	Country	SoC	Year, month	Details
Kyocera S4	Japan	Snapdragon 430	2017-11	The S4 was announced on November 30, 2017. It features a Snapdragon 430 with a 5.0-inch display and 2600 mAh battery. It has 3 GB of RAM, a 13 MP rear camera, and a 5 MP front-facing camera.
Kyocera X3	Japan	Snapdragon 630	2017-11	Kyocera's X3 was announced by Y!Mobile on November 30, 2017, and features a Qualcomm Snapdragon 630 with a 5.2-inch display and 2800 mAh battery. It has 3 GB of RAM, a 13 MP rear camera, and an 8 MP front-facing camera.
HTC X2	Japan	Snapdragon 630	2017-11	HTC's X2 was announced by Y!Mobile on November 30, 2017, and features a Qualcomm Snapdragon 630 with a 5.0-inch display and 2600 mAh. It has 3 GB of RAM, a 16 MP rear camera, and a 4 MP front-facing camera.
Motorola Moto X4	US	Snapdragon 630	2017-10	Motorola Moto X4 was announced in August 2017 and released in October 2017. It is the first Android One Smartphone by Motorola with Qualcomm Snapdragon 630 Chipset. It comes with dual camera.
HTC U11 Life	UK, Germany	Snapdragon 630	2017-09	The HTC U11 Life phone's move to the Android One program was announced on September 13, 2017. The rebranded HTC phone is the third (Following Xiaomi's Mi A1 and Motorola's Moto X4) mid-tier Android phone to join the Android One group of phones.
Xiaomi Mi A1	Worldwide	Snapdragon 625	2017-09	The Xiaomi Mi A1 was announced on September 5, 2017. It is jointly developed by Google and Xiaomi. It is a rebrand of the Mi 5X differing only in name and software. It ships with Android 7.1.2 Nougat and will receive a minimum of two years of OS upgrades. It has already received an upgrade to Android 8.0 "Oreo" at the end of 2017 and is also expected to get Android P in 2018, with monthly security patches in between. It has a 5.5" 1920 x 1080 display with 2.5D Corning Gorilla glass, a full-metal body with rounded edges, a fingerprint sensor, dual camera, a 3080 mAh battery, a USB-C port, is powered by an Adreno 506 GPU, has 4 GB of RAM and 64 GB flash memory. It is the second Android One device ever to have become available in Europe after the BQ Aquaris A4.5. Unlike previous Android One smartphones that were limited only to their own respective countries, this Xiaomi Mi A1 is the first Android One smartphone that will be widely available in many countries (at least 36 others). With the release of the Xiaomi Mi A1, Google is bringing a unified and consistent hardware and software experience to the developing world. Later, HMD Global (through Nokia brand) and Lenovo-owned Motorola Mobility were also included to the group of brands offering Android One smartphones globally (with smaller international distribution limitations).
Sharp X1	Japan	Snapdragon 435	2017-06	Sharp's X1 was released on June 30, 2017, in Japan with Android 7.1.2. It has a 5.3-inch 1920×1080 IGZO display and is IP68 rated.
Sharp S1	Japan	Snapdragon 430	2017-02	The S1 is Sharp's second Android One phone for Japan. It was released on February 24, 2017, in four different colors with Android 7.0 featuring a 5-inch 1920×1080 IGZO display and an IP67 rating.
General Mobile GM 6	Turkey, Netherlands, Italy	MT6737T	2017-02	The General Mobile GM 6 was launched in February 2017. It was announced at Mobile World Congress 2017. It's a 5.0-inch 720p phone with 3 GB RAM, a 3000 mAh battery and a fingerprint scanner. It will also be sold in the Netherlands and Italy starting July 2017.
Kyocera S2	Japan	Snapdragon 425	2017-01	In January 2017, Kyocera announced their first Android One phone for Japan. The S2 is waterproofed and sports a 5-inch HD screen with tempered glass. It was released with Android 7.0 and updated to Android 7.1 later in March 2017.

=== 2016 ===
OEM, Model	Country	SoC	Year, month	Details
Sharp 507SH	Japan	Snapdragon 617	2016-07	507SH was launched in July 2016. It is the first Android One phone launched in Japan and is one of the first Android One smartphones from major manufacturer. It is released by Y!Mobile, a subsidiary of Softbank, based on AQUOS U, another similar Sharp phone released by au KDDI. The phone includes numerous functionalities that are unique to Japan, including FeliCa, waterproof, and one-seg. Several other functionalities, like Emopa, were also originally planned to add to the phone, but were removed later as they might delay the software update.
General Mobile 5 Plus	Turkey	Snapdragon 617	2016-02	On February 22, 2016, General Mobile announced their second Android One phone at Mobile World Congress. GM 5 Plus, which comes with the Snapdragon 617 octacore processor along with 3 GB of RAM, 13 MP cameras on both sides, a USB-C port and 3100 mAh battery. It's the first Android One phone that has a USB-C port. GM 5 Plus is going to be sold in 16 countries firstly launching in Turkey in March.

=== 2015 ===
OEM, Model	Country	SoC	Year, month	Details
BQ Aquaris A4.5	Spain, Portugal	MT6582	2015-09	In September 2015, BQ launched in Spain the Aquaris A4.5. It was the first of the second generation of Android One devices to become available in Europe. It is a dual SIM 4G smart-phone with a 4.5-inch 540×960 pixel screen and a Dragontrail protective finish. The processor is a MediaTek MT6735M chip-set, with a 1 GHz quad-core CPU, two versions with 1 or 2 GB of RAM. Storage is set at 16 GB and it includes an expansion micro-SD card slot for up to 64 GB. The camera set-up consists of an 8 MP shooter on the back and a 5 MP front one. The battery capacity is 2470 mAh and it runs Android 5.1.1 out-of-the-box with support and updates directly from Google. On September 21, 2015, Google has announced the Aquaris A4.5 would also be sold in Portugal.
Cherry Mobile One G1	Philippines	Snapdragon 410	2015-08	Released on August 10, 2015, The Cherry Mobile One G1 is the third Android One smartphone released in the Philippines. The One G1 is a major upgrade when compared to other Android One devices in the country. It sports a 5-inch HD screen with Dragontrail glass, a Qualcomm Snapdragon processor (instead of a MediaTek processor), 2 GB of RAM, 16 GB of storage, and 4G LTE capability.
i-mobile IQ II	Thailand	Snapdragon 410	2015-08	On August 4, 2015, i-mobile launched the first Android One device in Thailand. The i-mobile IQ II has a 5.0-inch 1280×720 IPS display, 1.2 GHz Qualcomm Snapdragon 410 processor with 1 GB of RAM, 4G LTE (with dual SIM support), 16 GB of internal storage with expandable microSD card slot (max 32 GB), 2500 mAh removable battery, 8 MP back camera, and 2 MP front camera. It comes with Android 5.1.1 Lollipop pre-installed.
Infinix Hot 2 X510	Indonesia, Nigeria	MT6582	2015-08	After being launched in Nigeria in August 2015, Infinix Hot 2 X510 came into the Indonesian market as 2nd gen Android One phone on September 28, 2015. This Android One phone has some improvements over the 3 other Android One devices launched before. It has a 5-inch, 720 × 1280 resolution, 293 ppi, Capacitive IPS display surfaced with DragonTrail Glass; 2 GB RAM and 16 GB Internal ROM; 8 MP rear camera with single LED flash and 2 MP front camera; LED notification; 2200 mAh Li-ion battery and good stylish body with mirror looks back panel made from polycarbonate plastic. The other specifications are still the same with its predecessors. The Infinix Hot 2 uses a 6580 MediaTek SoC with a 1.3 GHz ARM Cortex A7 Quadcore processor and Mali 400MP1 GPU; FM Radio; Micro SD; in built GPS; and 3G dual micro SIM support. But the Infinix Hot 2 also lacks some features present in its predecessors such as no gyroscopes or a magnetic/compass sensor and no OTG USB support. The Infinix Hot 2 also doesn't support 4G LTE. The Infinix Hot 2 comes in multiple choices of colors: Gold, Black and White and much more. The Infinix Hot 2 also has the original pure AOSP 5.1 Lollipop pre-installed. It received Android 6.0 Marshmallow in January 2016 and will get the next incremental Android version, which is scheduled by Infinix instead of Google directly. On August 18, 2015, Infinix Mobility launched the Infinix Hot 2 in Lagos, Nigeria. The flagship smartphone which runs on Android One was first made available on Jumia, one of the largest online retail stores in Nigeria. Infinix Hot 2 comes with a 1.3 GHz Quadcore processor, 5-inch HD double glass screen, dual-SIM support, 16 GB ROM and Android 5.1.1 Lollipop pre-installed. It is in two variations with one having 1 GB RAM and the other having 2 GB RAM. It has a 2 MP front camera and 8 MP back camera. It received an update to Android version 6.0 during the early quarter of 2016.
QMobile A1	Pakistan		2015-07	On July 6, 2015, Google has launched the QMobile A1 in Pakistan. The new Android One smartphone is readily available for purchase at retail stores across the country. The QMobile A1 brings a stock Android experience (Lollipop 5.1.1) to an affordable price point for those who simply cannot splash out on flagship devices. The QMobile A1 comes with a 1.3 GHz Quad core processor, a 4.5-inch IPS FWVGA screen, dual-SIM support, 1 GB of RAM, 8 GB ROM and Android 5.1.1 (Lollipop) pre-installed. The device also has a back camera of 5.0 MP along with a LED flash, a front camera of 2 MP and a 1700 mAh battery.
Lava Mobiles Pixel V1	India	MT6582	2015-07	In July 2015, Lava Mobiles launched the 3G phone Pixel V1 with a 1.3 GHz quad-core Mediatek MT6582 processor and 2 GB RAM. It recently got updated to Android 6.0 (Marshmallow).
Cherry Mobile One	Myanmar	MT6582	2015-06	On June 23, 2015, Google announced the first Android One phone in Myanmar. The Cherry Mobile One, the Android One device from the Philippines, is the first to market in Myanmar. As with most Android One devices, it runs on a MediaTek MT6582 SoC, with a 4.5-inch, 480×854 resolution IPS display, 1 GB of RAM, 8 GB of internal storage, a Mali-400 GPU, 5 megapixel-rear camera, 2 megapixel-front camera, FM Radio, and dual SIM support. The Cherry Mobile One will come with Android Lollipop 5.1.1 out of the box. It will be available in stores on June 26, 2015.
General Mobile 4G	Turkey	Snapdragon 410	2015-05	On May 12, 2015, Google announced the first Android One phone available in Turkey, becoming available in stores on May 15, 2015. The General Mobile 4G is also the first Android One phone that has a Qualcomm Snapdragon processor and 4G LTE support, using the LTE-capable Snapdragon 410, a 4-core processor running at 1.2 GHz with 2 GB of RAM.
Cherry Mobile One	Philippines	MT6582	2015-02	The Cherry Mobile One, launched in February 2015, is the latest addition to the Android One family, marketed specifically for the Philippine market. As with most Android One devices, it runs on a MediaTek MT6582 SoC, with a 4.5-inch, 480×854 resolution IPS display, 1 GB of RAM, a Mali-400 GPU, 5-megapixel rear camera, 2-megapixel front camera, FM radio and dual SIM support. The new device does bear some minor improvements over the original three, namely that it has 8 GB of storage space instead of 4 GB. Like the Mito Impact and the MyPhone Uno, the Cherry Mobile One will come with Android Lollipop 5.1.1 out of the box. On June 23, 2015, Google announced that the Cherry Mobile One will be sold in Myanmar.
MyPhone Uno	Philippines		2015-02	Like the Cherry Mobile One, the MyPhone Uno, launched in February 2015, is made with the Philippine market in mind, and shares similar specifications. The Uno, however, only comes with 4 GB of internal storage, but will also receive regular software updates. The MyPhone Uno shares the same design as the Micromax Canvas A1.
Mito Impact	Indonesia	MT6582	2015-02	It is the Android One device available for Indonesia. It was launched in February 2015. Based on Google's reference design, it has a 4.5-inch, 480×854 resolution IPS display, a MediaTek MT6582 SoC with 1.3 GHz quad-core Cortex-A7 CPU and Mali 400 MP2 GPU, 1 GB RAM, 1780 mAh battery, 5-megapixel rear camera, 2-megapixel front camera, FM radio and dual SIM support. The new device does bear some minor improvements over the original three, namely that it has 8 GB of storage space instead of 4. The main attraction of the Mito Impact One is that it is running Android Lollipop out of the box. The device is available as of February 2015
Evercoss One X	Indonesia	MT6582	2015-02	It is the Android One device available for Indonesia at the price of Rp. 999,000 ($82). It was launched in February 2015. Based on Google's reference design, it has a 4.5-inch, 854×480 resolution IPS display, a MediaTek MT6582 SoC with 1.3 GHz quad-core Cortex-A7 CPU and Mali 400 MP2 GPU, 1 GB RAM, 1700 mAh battery, 5-megapixel rear camera, 2-megapixel front camera, FM radio and dual SIM support. The new device does bear some minor improvements over the original three, namely that it has 8 GB of storage space instead of 4. The main attraction of the Evercoss One X is that it is running Android Lollipop out of the box.
Nexian Journey One	Indonesia	MT6582	2015-02	Nexian Journey One is the Android One device available for Indonesia. It was launched in February 2015. Based on Google's reference design, it has a 4.5-inch, 854×480 resolution IPS display, a MediaTek MT6582 SoC with 1.3 GHz quad-core Cortex-A7 CPU and Mali 400 MP2 GPU, 1 GB RAM, 1700 mAh battery, 5-megapixel rear camera, 2-megapixel front camera, FM radio and dual SIM support. The new device does bear some minor improvements over the original three, namely that it has 8 GB of storage space instead of 4. The main attraction of the Nexian Journey One is that it is running stock Android Lollipop out of the box. Nexian Journey One was launched on February 4 and claimed to be the first device launched with Android 5.1 Lollipop.

The Snapdragon 410 devices are rebrands of the Longcheer L8150, which is based on the Qualcomm Seed reference design, explaining their similarities. A direct competitor is the Wileyfox Swift, which is available worldwide, officially supported by Wileyfox with recent Android versions and community supported with LineageOS ROMs.

=== 2014 ===
OEM, Model	Country	SoC	Year, month	Details
Symphony Roar A50	Bangladesh	MT6582	2014-12	Along with Micromax Canvas A1, Spice Dream uno and Karbon Sparkle V Bangladesh also get local brand Symphony Roar A50. It was released in December 2014.
Karbonn Sparkle V	India	MT6582	2014-09	Karbonn Sparkle V, released in September 2014, runs on Android 4.4.4 (KitKat) and is upgradeable to 6.0.1 Marshmallow through OTA. It is powered by a 1.3 GHz quad-core processor. The device has dual SIM card slots, 1 GB RAM and 4 GB of internal storage and is powered by a Mali 400 GPU. The 4.5-inch display has a resolution of 480×854 pixels. It comes equipped with a 5 MP rear camera and 2 MP front camera. The device is equipped with Wi-Fi 802.11 b/g/n, Bluetooth 4.0, A-GPS and a microUSB port. Its 1700 mAh battery reportedly delivers 160 hours of stand by time, and 8 hours of talk time. As part of the Android One initiative, the Karbonn Sparkle V would get automatic OTA updates to the latest version of the Android OS in line with Nexus and Google Play Edition devices. It is also the first Android One device ever to have become available in Europe. It has also been upgraded to Marshmallow.
Micromax Canvas A1	India	MT6582	2014-09	Micromax Canvas A1, released in September 2014, is one of the initial Android One phones, which is manufactured by Micromax Mobile with the cooperation of Google. The Micromax Canvas A1 features Android 4.4.4 (KitKat) OS with a 1.3 GHz quad-core processor and a 4.5-inch capacitive touchscreen. This device has 1 GB RAM, 4/8 GB internal storage (2.35/5.75 GB usable) and a Mali-400 GPU. In June 2015, Micromax rolled out a refreshed version of the Canvas A1 which had twice the internal storage and came with Android 5.1 Lollipop preinstalled. Both of them were recently updated to Android 6.0.1 Marshmallow.
Spice Dream UNO	India	MT6582	2014-09	The Spice Dream UNO (Mi-498), launched in September 2014, is powered by a MediaTek SoC with a 1.3 GHz quad-core processor and Mali-400 GPU paired with 1 GB of RAM. It is a dual-SIM phone. It has a 4.5-inch screen with FWVGA (480×854 pixels) IPS LCD. It was released with Android 4.4.4 KitKat. The new batch comes with Android 5.1 Lollipop and the old batch is upgradeable to Android 5.1. It has a 5 MP camera with an LED flash and ability to shoot full HD videos and a 2 MP front camera. It comes with 4 GB of internal storage and the option of adding a microSD card of up to 32 GB capacity. The phone is powered by a 1700 mAh Li-ion battery. Spice claims the battery will offer 10 hours of talk time and 160 hours of standby. Now it runs on Android 6.0.1 Marshmallow.
