= Lava Pixel V1 =

Android smartphone

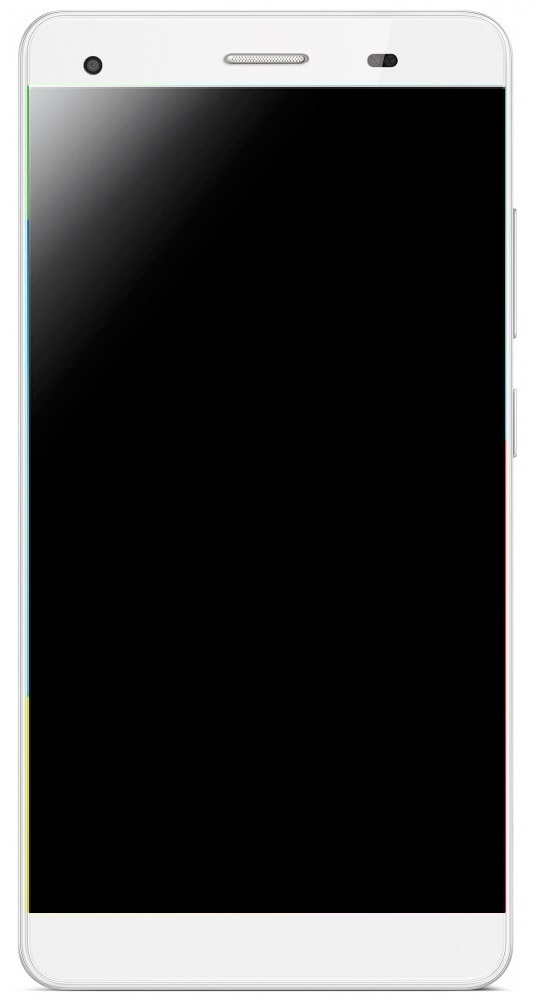
- Lava Pixel V1 in white
- Manufacturer: Lava International
- Type: Touchscreen smartphone
- Series: android one
- First released: 5 July 2015; 10 years ago
- Predecessor: Micromax Canvas A1; Spice Deram Uno; Karbon Sparkle V1
- Compatible networks: Dual Sim (3G GSM)
- Form factor: Slate
- Weight: 135 g (4.8 oz)
- Operating system: Android 6.0 Marshmallow
- CPU: 1.3 GHz octa core MediaTek MT6582
- GPU: Broadcom VideoCore IV
- Memory: 2 GB RAM
- Storage: 32 GB flash memory
- Removable storage: microSD up to 32GB
- Battery: 2,650 mAh Lithium-Ion battery
- Rear camera: 8.0 (SW enhanced 13.0) Megapixel AF, LED flash
- Front camera: 5.0 (SW enhanced 8.0) Megapixel
- Display: 5.50 in (14.0 cm) TFT LCD; 267 PPI 16M color
- Connectivity: Wi-Fi 802.11 b/ g/ n b/g/n Bluetooth 4.0 with A2DP; A-GPS; Micro USB 2.0; 3.5 mm TRRS audio jack FM radio with RDS support
- Data inputs: Capacitive touchscreen Push-buttons; Accelerometer; Proximity Sensor; Ambient light sensor
- Development status: Active
- SAR: 135 W/g (body)

Lava Pixel V1 is a dual SIM Android smartphone, manufactured and marketed by Lava International, in India, which is the second generation Android One device by this company. It was released in July 2015. Being a device of the Android One series its software is same as instructed by Google i.e. Stock Android, and will get OTA updates as quickly as the Nexus devices. The device was launched exclusively on Flipkart and was sold for Rs. 9990 in India.
