= Nokia XR20 =

Nokia-branded high-end Android smartphone

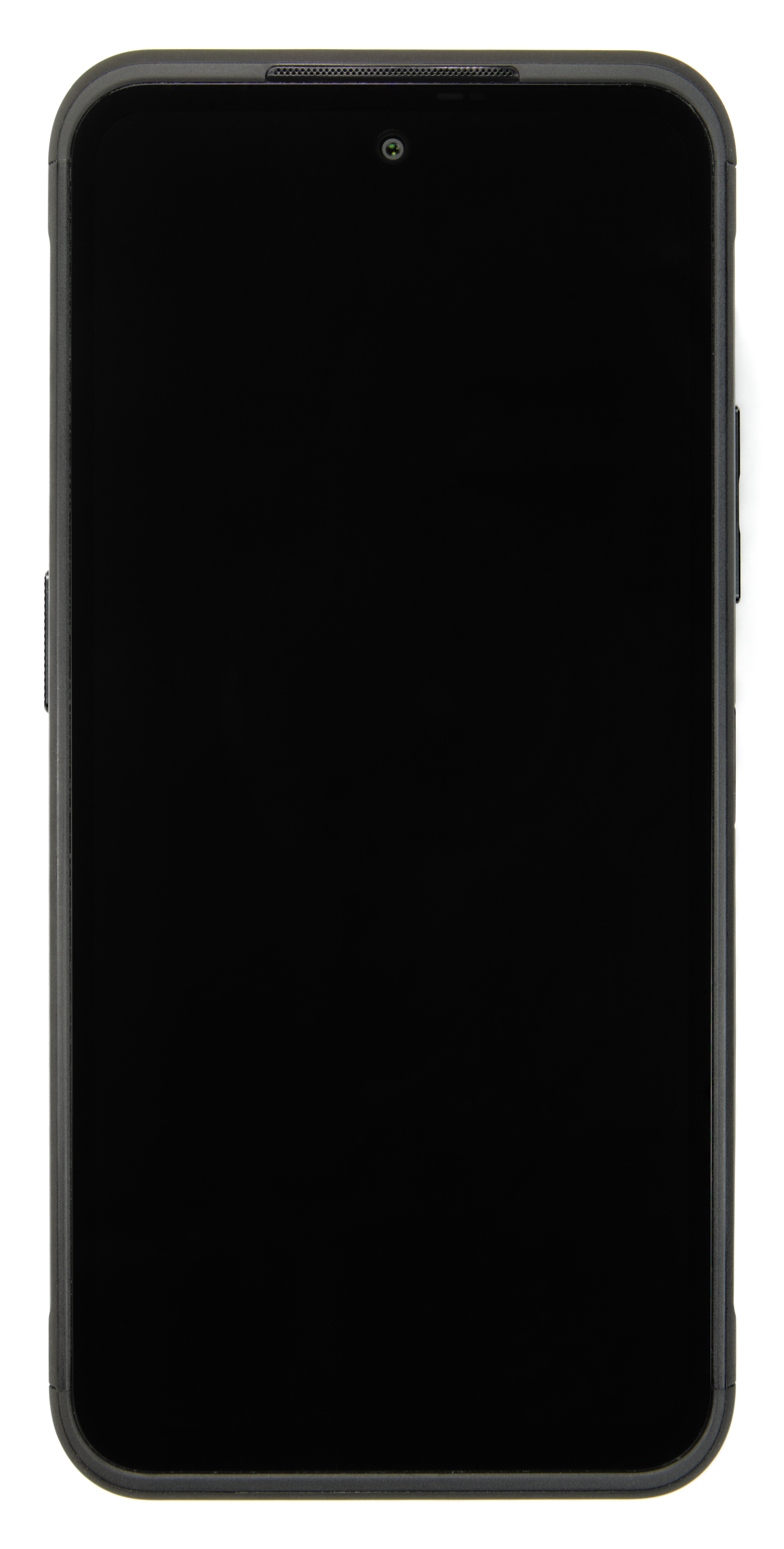
- Brand: Nokia
- Developer: HMD Global
- Manufacturer: HMD Global
- Type: Phablet
- Predecessor: None
- Successor: Nokia XR21
- Related: Nokia X20
- Form factor: Slate
- Dimensions: 171.64 mm × 81.5 mm × 10.64 mm (6.757 in × 3.209 in × 0.419 in)
- Weight: 248 g (8.7 oz)
- Operating system: Original: Android Android 11; Current: Android 14
- System-on-chip: Qualcomm Snapdragon 480 5G
- CPU: Qualcomm Kryo 460
- GPU: Adreno 619
- Memory: 6 GB RAM
- Storage: 128 GB
- Removable storage: microSD, up to 512 GB (shared)
- Battery: Non-removable Li-Po 4630 mAh
- Charging: USB-C charging (18 W); Qi wireless charging (15 W); Quick Charge 4.0
- Rear camera: 48 MP with ZEISS optics, f/1.79 aperture + 13 MP (Wideangle), f/2.4 aperture; dual-tone flash
- Front camera: 8 MP
- Display: 6.67 in (16.9 cm) 2400 x 1080 with Gorilla Glass Victus
- Sound: Bottom mounted loud speaker, duel speaker mode, Nokia OZO 360° audio, Dolby Atmos compatible decoding, active noise cancellation with dedicated microphone
- Connectivity: 3.5 mm TRRS headphone jack; Bluetooth 5.1; USB 3.0 (5 Gbit/s) via USB-C port; Wi‑Fi 6 (802.11ax); 2G; 3G; 4G LTE; 5G
- Data inputs: Capacitive touchscreen; Fingerprint scanner; Accelerometer; Gyroscope; Proximity sensor; Electronic compass; Barometer; Ambient light sensor; GPS; Galileo; GLONASS; BeiDou; QZSS; NavIC
- Codename: R1
- Other: NFC, IP68 (water resistant up to 1.5 m (4.9 ft) for 1 hour), MIL-STD-810H certified
- Website: www.nokia.com/phones/en_us/nokia-xr-20

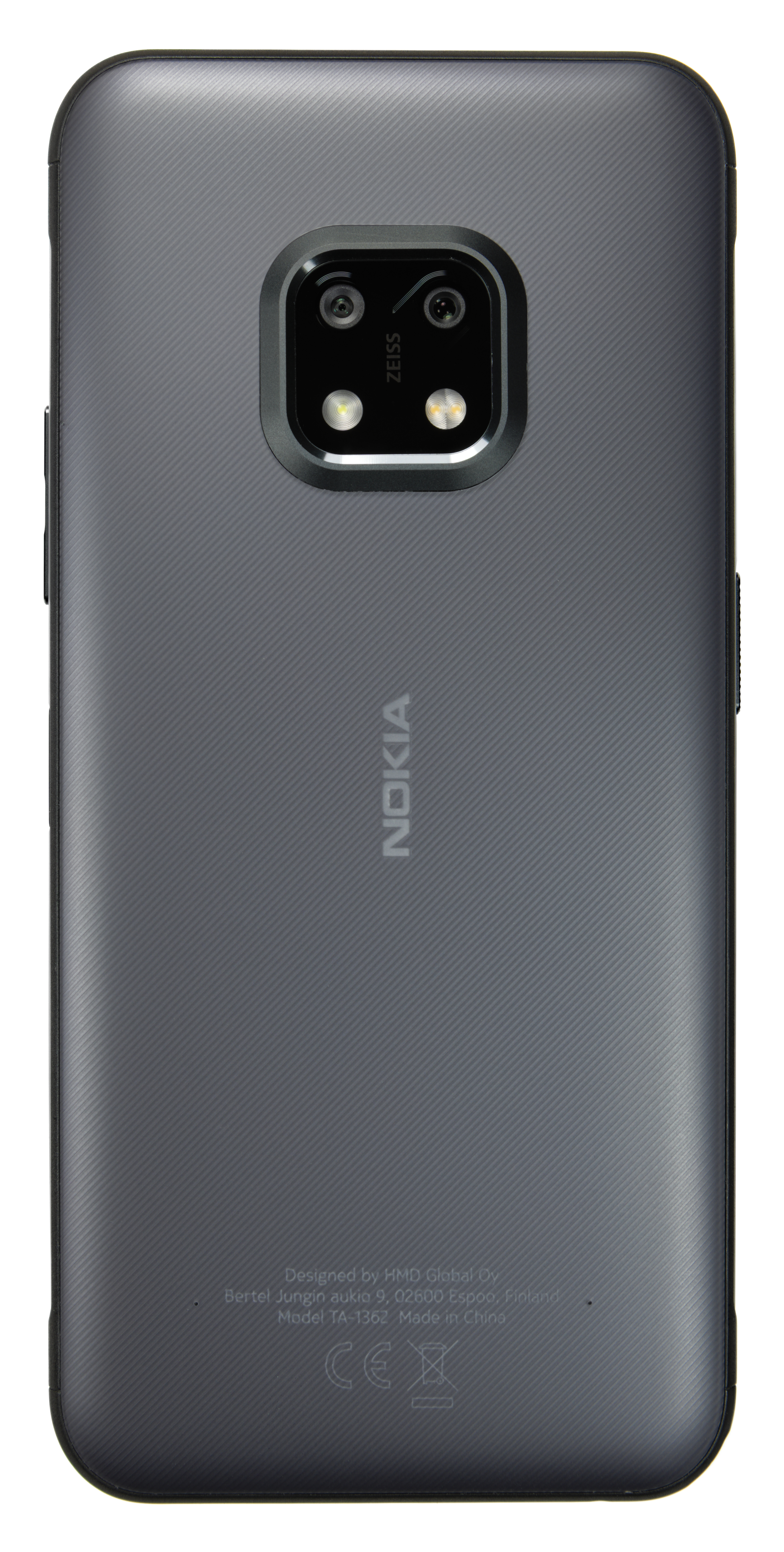
The back side of a Nokia XR20

The Nokia XR20 is a Nokia-branded smartphone that was manufactured by HMD Global.

The Nokia XR20 is also the last Nokia-branded smartphone that utilizes Zeiss optics due to HMD Global and Zeiss mutually parting way from the partnership.
