= Micromax Canvas 2 A110 =

Smartphone model

- Manufacturer: Chinese OEM
- Type: Smartphone
- Series: Micromax Canvas
- First released: November 2012; 13 years ago
- Predecessor: Micromax Superphone Canvas A100
- Successor: Micromax Canvas HD A116
- Form factor: Slate
- Dimensions: 147 mm (5.8 in) H 76.5 mm (3.01 in) W 9.7 mm (0.38 in) D
- Weight: 168 g (5.9 oz)
- Operating system: Android v4.0.4(Ice Cream Sandwich), upgradable to v4.1.1 (Jelly Bean) only through service centers
- System-on-chip: MediaTek MT6577
- CPU: 1 GHz Dual-Core Cortex-A9
- GPU: PowerVR SGX531
- Memory: 512 MB RAM
- Storage: 4 GB internal storage (2 GB user available) + Up to 32 GB on microSD memory card
- Battery: Li-on 2000 mAh
- Rear camera: 8.0 MP (3264 x 2448) autofocus, dual LED flash
- Front camera: VGA
- Display: 5 in (130 mm) IPS panel with 480×854 pixels (196 ppi)
- Connectivity: Bluetooth 3.0 with A2DP microUSB 2.0 with OTG; 3.5 mm audio jack aGPS; Wi-Fi 802.11 b/g/n GSM 900 / 1800 - SIM 1 & SIM 2 HSDPA 2100
- Data inputs: Multi-touch capacitive touchscreen, Accelerometer, 3-axis gyroscope, magnetometer, proximity sensor
- Development status: Available
- SAR: 0.68 W/kg (head)
- Website: www.micromaxinfo.com

The Micromax Canvas 2 A110 is a dual-sim Android smartphone by Micromax Mobile which is a rebranded Chinese mobile Beidu Chi/ German Mobistel cynus T2 released in November 2012 that supersedes the Micromax Superphone Canvas A100. It was launched in November 2012 featuring a 1 GHz dual-core processor, 512 MB of RAM and a 5.0 IPS LCD screen.

== Design ==
The Micromax Canvas 2 A110 has a slate form factor 5-inch IPS display with a resolution of 480×854 with 196 ppi. It is powered by a 1 GHz dual-core CPU, 512 MB of RAM and runs on Android 4.0.4 ICS (Upgradable to Android 4.1.1). The device has 4 GB internal storage of which 1.05 GB is user available that can be expanded up to 32 GB via a microSD or mircroSDHC card. The rear of the Micromax Canvas 2 A110 has an 8 MP camera with dual LED flash and the front has 0.3 MP VGA camera for video-calling. The Micromax Canvas 2 A110 comes with preloaded apps such as M!Buddy, CricketFever, HookUp, Micromax MZone and the Micromax MStore.

Official Jelly Bean update for Micromax A110 Canvas 2 has been announced, Details.

== Hardware ==
Micromax A110 Canvas 2 is powered by 1 GHz ARM Dual-Core Cortex A9 processor on MediaTek's MT6577 SoC with PowerVR SGX531 GPU. It has 512 MB RAM.
