= PixelExperience =

Discontinued Android-based mobile operating system

Pixel Experience
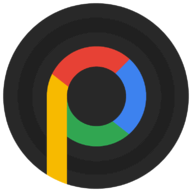
- Developer: Pixel Experience open-source community
- OS family: Android (Linux)
- Working state: Discontinued
- Source model: Open source
- Initial release: 2017
- Final release: 13 (based on Android 13) / 24 September 2023; 3 years ago
- Final preview: 14 (based on Android 14) / 29 February 2024; 2 years ago
- Marketing target: Operating system replacement for Android devices
- Update method: Over-the-air (OTA), ROM flashing
- Package manager: APK-based
- Supported platforms: arm, arm64, x86, x86-64
- Kernel type: Monolithic (Linux)
- License: GNU General Public License v3.0
- Official website: get.pixelexperience.org

PixelExperience (Note: Also known as Pixel Experience or PE) is a discontinued, open-source, Android-based operating system. (Note: Sometimes referred to as a custom ROM) The project was initiated by a community of developers in 2017. Pixel Experience was designed to be as close to "stock Android" as possible, with a focus on reliability, security, stability, performance, battery life, and useful customizations.

== History ==
In 2017, XDA Developer jhenrique09 started an experimental project for a custom ROM that mimics the software experience of the Google Pixel lineup.

In June 2021, downloads moved to Storj cloud storage.

On February 29, 2024, the project announced the release of PE 14, while mentioning the reduction of involvement from the founder, jhenrique09, as the reason for release delay. The core team was reorganized for the release.

On April 10, 2024, Pixel Experience ROM development officially stopped, according to the founder José Henrique. While older versions remain available, the project is no longer actively maintained.

== Features ==
Pixel Experience featured monthly Android security patches.

Pixel Experience was designed to mimic the user interface of Google Pixel phones, and included Pixel exclusive features that are not available on stock Android, such as Pixel Boot Animation, Pixel setup, Pixel Launcher (with round icon support), Pixel Live Wallpapers, Pixel Themes, icons, fonts, Pixel Camera (on some devices), Pixel dialer, Pixel Recorder, Pixel Sound, Google Assistant Pixel, etc.

Users also had options to customize the status bar, lock screen, theme, icon shape, font, clock/date format, icon size, notification logos, brightness slider position, accent color to personalize the home screen, install custom fonts and use mods. Multiple pre-installed themes and icon packs were also available.

=== Plus variant ===
An official Plus variant had additional functionality:

- Per-app volume settings
- Network traffic monitor
- Notch hiding support
- UI enhancements
- Additional gestures (such as 3-finger swipe for screenshot)
- LiveDisplay panel, for tweaking color profile, display mode, reading mode, and color calibration
- More granular customizability including modifying status bar icons, volume and power button cutomization, lock screen cutomizations
- Screen recorder
- Custom screenshot: take screenshot selecting any part of the screen
- Caffeine: temporarily disable screen lock & sleep mode

== Community and support ==
Pixel Experience had an active community of users and developers, with official groups on Instagram, Telegram, and XDA. A wide variety of devices was supported.

The project also had a wiki with content on installation, usage and troubleshooting.

== See also ==
- Android rooting
- Comparison of mobile operating systems
- List of custom Android distributions
- List of free and open-source Android applications
