= YU Televentures =

Indian consumer electronics company

YU Televentures Pvt. Ltd.
- Trade name: YU
- Type: Subsidiary
- Industry: Telecommunications, Consumer Electronics
- Founded: November 2014; 11 years ago in Gurgaon, Haryana, India
- Founder: Rahul Sharma
- Headquarters: Gurgaon, Haryana, India
- Area served: India
- Key people: Shubhodip Pal (Chief Operating Officer)
- Products: Smartphones, Health Band, Mini-ECG device, Portable Pocket Printer, Power bank
- Parent: Micromax Informatics
- Website: https://yuplaygod.com/ [defunct]

YU Televentures was an Indian consumer electronics brand, it was incorporated in November 2014 as a joint venture between Cyanogen Inc and Micromax Informatics Limited. Also, YU holds official Cyanogen OS rights in India. In December 2016 the CyanogenMod developer group discontinued the Cyanogen OS. Micromax co-founder Rahul Sharma owns a 99% controlling stake in YU while the remaining 1% is held by two other co-founders, Vikas Jain and Sumeet Arora. Later the YU subbrand of Micromax was discontinued by the brand and the official site redirected to Micromax's official website. YU Televentures was remade on 7 June 2019.

== Products ==
=== Phones ===
==== YU Yureka ====
YU Televenture's first mobile phone was called the 'YU Yureka', ran on the Cyanogen OS, and was released in January 2015. It is a legal rebranding of the Coolpad F2 and is powered by a 64-bit Snapdragon 615 SoC alongside 2 GB DDR3 RAM. It has a MSM8939 LTE Chipset and integrated Adreno 405 GPU @550Mhz. Yureka was launched with the Cyanogen OS 12 based on Android Lollipop 5.0.2, which allows users to customize their phone. The YU Yureka has now been discontinued on the Amazon website.

The YU Yureka Plus was an improved version of the YU Yureka and was released in July 2015, which is a rebranding of Coolpad 8675-fhd. It had an improved 13 MP camera, 1080p Full HD display, and ran on Cyanogen OS 12.1. After that, the company also released the stock Android version of the phone running Android KitKat. The company promised to release the Android Lollipop update for the Stock Android version phone in 1 year but the company was not able to fulfill their promise due to the closure of Cyanogen Inc.

Yu Yureka Note is a Note version of the smartphone, with 6-inch display and also 4000 mAh battery.

Yu Yureka S, another improved version of Yu Yureka, was released in August 2016. It has an improved Octa-Core Snapdragon 616 Processor and powered by Adreno 405 GPU to support 3D games.

==== YU Yuphoria ====
The YU Yuphoria, released on May 12, 2015, had almost exactly the same technical specifications as the YU Yureka except for the Camera and Chipset. It came with 2 GB RAM, 16 GB ROM, 1.2 GHz Snapdragon 410 processor (MSM8916 chipset) and a 5-inch 720p screen with Gorilla Glass 3. It had a 8 MP rear camera and a 5 MP front camera. It came with two variants. The first variant 'YU5010' came with Cyanogen OS 12 based on Android 5.0 (upgradable to 5.1.1), and later YU released the 'YU5010A' variant with stock Android 5.1.1 installed onto it. The YU5010A variant later received an update, which enabled VoLTE support on the device.

==== YU Yutopia ====
The YU Yutopia was the successor to the YU Yuphoria and was released on 17 December 2015. It had Snapdragon 810, a 5.2-inch 2K Screen(WQHD), 4 GB RAM, 32 GB ROM, a 3000 mAh battery with QuickCharge, and a fingerprint sensor.

==== YU Yunicorn ====
The YU Yunicorn was the successor to the YU Yutopia and was released on 31 May 2016. The device is powered by a Helio P10 MediaTek 1.8 GHz octa-core, 64-bit chipset which is paired with 4 GB of RAM. Other specifications include a 5.5-inch full HD IPS display, 32 GB ROM, a 4,000 mAh battery and a fingerprint sensor. It has a 13 MP rear camera and a 5 MP front camera.

==== YU Yunique ====
YU Yunique is a budget version 4G phone from YU was launched in September 2015. It is powered by 1.2 GHz quad-core Qualcomm Snapdragon 410 processor and it comes with 1 GB of RAM with 4.7-inch display in just $80 or ₹5000. During the time of release in India this phone was considered as best budget phone around this price.

Yu Yunique Plus smartphone was launched in August 2016 which is upgraded to 2 GB of RAM.

YU Yureka Black

The YU Yureka Black was released in June 2017 runs on Qualcomm Snapdragon 430. It has a 4 GB RAM and fingerprint sensor. It sport a 13 MP back camera and 8 MP front camera. Came with Android Marshmallow, and updatable to Android Nougat 7.1.1 via OTA

YU Yunique 2

The YU Yunique 2 was released in July 2017 runs on MediaTek MT6737 quad core processor and has 2 GB RAM & 16 GB ROM. It sports a 13 MP rear camera and a 5 MP front camera and is powered by Android Nougat v7.0.

YU Yureka 2

The YU Yureka 2 was released in September 2017 and runs on Qualcomm Snapdragon 625 chipset, having 4 gigabytes of RAM and 4000 mAh battery. It has 16 MP rear camera and 8 MP shooter in the front. It supports quick charge 3. It was a direct competitor to the Xiaomi Redmi Note 4

YU Ace

As of November 2018, this is the latest smartphone by YU Televentures, launched in September 2018. It runs on Mediatek MT6739WW chipset a quad core 1.5 GHz processor, and comes in 2 variants, a 2 GB RAM / 16 GB ROM variant and a 3 GB RAM / 32 GB ROM variant. The device came with Android 8.0 Oreo. The YU Ace costs Rs 5,999 & Rs 6,999 for the variants 2 GB RAM/16 GB ROM & 3 GB RAM/32 GB ROM respectively.

=== Health devices ===
==== YUfit ====
YU Televentures released the YUFit fitness tracking band on July 29, 2015. Similarly to other fitness tracking bands, it can track fitness information such as burnt calories, steps taken, and the calorie content of food items.

==== HealthYU ====
The HealthYU was another health device released by YU Televentures on July 29, 2015. It is used to monitor health data such as blood pressure, body temperature, and heart rate.

=== Other ===
==== YUpix ====
The YUPix is a portable mobile printer with an ink cartridge and 20 sheets to print on.

==== jYUice ====
The jYUice is a power bank from YU Televentures, and has a capacity of 5000 mAh or 10000 mAh. The power bank consists of an anodized aluminum shell which houses a lithium-polymer battery. The 5000 mAh model has a single 5 V/2.1 A USB port while the 10000 mAh model has a 5 V/1 A USB port and a 5 V/2.4 A USB port. It comes with a multi-colored LED light to indicate how much charge the jYUice has.
