= Nexian =

Indonesian company

Nexian was an Indonesian mobile phone company that was started in 2006 by Martono Jayakusuma. It was the first local brand to achieve 100,000 locally produced mobile phones in six months. It had the fourth largest market share with 5% of mobile phones in Indonesia. Nexian created mostly QWERTY mobile phones. The company sold smartphones with multi SIM cards in-one on budget markets.

Nexian was acquired by Spice Group in 2011.

== Products ==
=== Android ===
Nexian Android A890 Journey is Nexian's first Android smartphone. It has a single SIM card slot. The Nexian Journey NX-A890 debuted at the Indonesia Cellular Show (ICS) in 2011.

Nexian Android A891 Ultra Journey Single GSM. The Nexian Journey NX-A891 debuted at the Indonesia Cellular Show (ICS) in 2011.

Nexian Android A892 Cosmic Journey dual GSM. The Nexian Journey NX-A892 debuted at the Indonesia Cellular Show (ICS) in 2011.

Nexian Tablet Android A7500 Genius. The Nexian Journey NX-A7500 debuted at the Indonesia Cellular Show (ICS) in 2011.

=== GSM ===
All GSM phones have two SIM card slots. Some phones have applications such as eBuddy and Facebook. The three main mobile phone operators in Indonesia (Telkomsel, XL Axiata and Indosat) are in partnership with Nexian to launch its GSM phones. Currently, there are also smartphones with new features such as a TV antenna on its NX-T911. Most GSM smartphones are manufactured with QWERTY keyboards.

In Yahoo! Search Trends 2011, Indonesian people search Nexian G-965 Champion as number 8 of 10 most gadget search. It is a smartphone touch series with 3.5" HVGA Capacitive Touch Screen and is provided with EDGE and WiFi. The launching price is less than Rp800,000 ($80.8).

=== CDMA ===
All of Nexian's CDMA phones and smartphones have a similar system with the GSM phones. Some phones use the term NX-FPxxx for phones in partnership with Telkom's Flexi CDMA service. Phones such as NX-C900 are one of Nexian's CDMA smartphones that uses QWERTY keyboard.

=== Hybrid ===
Nexian has produced Candybar Handsets and QWERTY Dual SIM handsets. In October 2010, the mobile phone company launched the Nexian Hybrid NX-271D that can support three cards (2GSM + 1CDMA) as well as standby (Triple On). It is not the first handphone in Indonesia with capability of Triple On.

== Awards ==
- Product Of The year 2011 - Nexian She (NX-G788)
- Digital Marketing Award 2011 Category Handphone - Great Performing Brand in Social Media
- Golden Ring Award 2011 - Most Favorite Local Brand and Best Innovative Local Brand
- Solo Best Brand Index 2011 - Best Local Brand
- Word of Mouth Marketing(WOMM)Award 2011 - Best Local Brand
- Markplus Award 2010 - Best in Market Driving And Best Innovation
- Marketing Award 2010 - Customers Satisfaction Award
- ICA 2010 - The Best Value Services for Nexian Messenger
- Seluler Award 2010 - The Best Local Brand and The Best Favourite Music Concept
- Golden Ring Award 2010 - The Best Qwerty Local Brand 2010 (NX-G801)
- Golden Ring Award 2010 - The Best Entry Level Phone 2010 (NX-G330 Dangdut POD)
- Golden Ring Award 2010 - The Best Local Brand 2010
- Golden Ring Award 2009 - The Most Favorite Local Brand
