= Micromax Canvas A1 =

Android smartphone

Micromax Canvas A1(AQ4501)
- Developer: Google, Micromax
- Manufacturer: Micromax
- Type: Smartphone
- Series: Android One
- First released: September 2014
- Compatible networks: 2G/3G; GSM: 850/900/1800/1900 MHz; WCDMA: 850/2100 MHz
- Form factor: Slate phone
- Dimensions: 131 mm (5.16 in) H 65 mm (2.56 in) W 8 mm (0.32 in) H
- Weight: 136 g (4.8 oz)
- Operating system: Android 6.0 Marshmallow
- System-on-chip: MediaTek MT6582
- CPU: 1.3 GHz quad-core Cortex
- GPU: Mali (GPU) 400MP
- Memory: 1 GB of RAM
- Storage: Internal 4 GB (2.1 GB for Apps)
- Removable storage: Available, microSD up to 32 GB
- Battery: 1700 mAh Li-Po
- Rear camera: 5 MP with Autofocus and LED flash.
- Front camera: 2.0 MP @ 1.4um pixel (Fixed Focus)
- Display: 4.5 in (110 mm) 480x854 of 218 ppi pixel density, Capacitive touchscreen IPS
- Sound: Loudspeaker, 3.5mm headphone jack
- Connectivity: Micro USB, Bluetooth 4.0, Wi-Fi 802.11 b/g/n, Micro-SIM
- Data inputs: Multi-touch capacitive touchscreen, Power Button, Volume Rocker
- Codename: sprout (shared among all Android One phones)
- SAR: 0.24 W/kg @1g (Head); 0.93 W/kg @1g (Body)

The Canvas A1 is a phone co-developed by Google as its Android One initiative and Micromax that runs the Android (operating system). The initiative was started by Google to provide an affordable yet feature-rich smartphone for developing nations, India being the first. The initiative is headed by Sundar Pichai.

== Specifications ==
=== Hardware ===
Canvas A1 is powered by a 1.3 GHz quad-core Mediatek MT6582 processor with 1 GB of RAM, A dual-core Mali - 400 MP2 GPU And with 4 GB of internal storage which is expandable up to 32 GB through a microSD card slot. It features a 1700 mAh Li-Po battery. The Canvas A1 has a 4.5-inch screen with 480x854 pixels resolution (218 PPI) IPS LCD, and includes a 5-megapixel rear-facing camera with [autofocus] and a 2.0 megapixel front-facing camera. It has an LED Notification light which glows in green and red colours. It has usual sensors like proximity sensor, Gravity sensor, Accelerometer, and Gyroscope Sensor. This phone follows FCC SAR standard. The SAR limit recommended by the FCC is 1.6 W/kg.The highest SAR value tested for this phone model is 0.24 W/kg @ 1g (Head) W/kg @ 1 g(Head) and 0.93 W/kg @ 1g (Body) W/Kg @ 1g(Body). In June 2015, Micromax Rolled out a refreshed version which had twice the internal storage (8GB) and Android 5.1.1 Lollipop Pre-installed.
