= Micromax Informatics =

Indian multinational electronics company

Micromax
- Trade name: Micromax
- Type: Private
- ISIN: INE720K01014
- Industry: Electronics; Consumer electronics; Computer hardwares; Home appliances
- Founded: 29 March 2000; 26 years ago
- Founder: Rahul Sharma
- Headquarters: Gurgaon, Haryana, India
- Area served: Worldwide
- Key people: Rahul Sharma (Co-founder & CEO)
- Products: Smartphones; Tablets; Air conditioners; LED TVs; Laptops; Power banks; Sound bars; Refrigerators; Washing machines
- Revenue: ▲₹30,368.79 crore (US$3.2 billion) (2025)
- Number of employees: 21,000+
- Subsidiaries: Bhagwati Products; MiPhi Semiconductors; Mobi Serve; Micromax Informatics FZE
- Website: micromaxinfo.com

Micromax Informatics is an Indian multinational manufacturer of consumer electronics and home appliances, headquartered in Gurgaon. It was established in March 2000 as an IT software company operating in embedded systems. It entered the mobile phone business in 2008 and, by 2010, became one of the largest companies making low-cost feature phones in India.

In 2014, Micromax was the world's tenth-largest smartphone vendor. In the subsequent years, the company faced stiff competition from Chinese companies that began penetrating the Indian market. The company also owns YU Televentures, which sells its products under the brand name YU. YU Televentures was shut down by 2018, and its final phone was the YU Ace, launched in 2018 as a final comeback attempt.

== History ==
Micromax was incorporated as Micromax Informatics Ltd. in the year 2000 by Rahul Sharma and Rohit Patel. It began selling mobile phones in 2008, focusing on democratising technology for the masses to compete with international players.

The company also introduced handsets (budget and flagship). After Micromax's co-founder Rahul Sharma once saw a public call office being powered by a truck battery because of frequent power cuts in its locale. This prompted him to launch a feature mobile phone with a long battery life called the X1i phone, Micromax's first mobile phone with a month-long battery backup.

In 2014, Micromax's sales in India exceeded those of Samsung. It became India's largest mobile phone supplier in the second quarter. On 24 January 2014, Micromax became the first Indian mobile company to sell in Russia. In 2020, Micromax made a comeback in the Indian mobile industry with a new sub-brand "IN". By 2022, Micromax had quit making smartphones. By 2026, the company limited its production to feature phones.

== Segments ==
=== Mobile handsets ===
- Dumb phones
- Smartphones

=== Consumer electronics ===
- Televisions
- Air Conditioning
- Refrigerators
- Washing Machines

Known for mobile handsets and LED TV panels, Micromax is also expanding its portfolio in the consumer electronics segment, targeting the "premium economy class" consumers.

== Products ==
=== Funbook series ===
Micromax entered the tablet computer market with the debut of the Funbook series.

Funbook Pro (HD display, fingerprint sensor) with Snapdragon processor & 1 GB RAM, runs Android One

=== Canvas Knight A350 and Canvas A1 ===
In March 2014, Micromax launched its first eight-core flagship smartphone, Canvas Knight A350 for the Russian market. In September of the same year, Micromax launched the Android One smartphone, Canvas A1.

=== Canvas Silver 5, Canvas Win W092 and Canvas Win W121 ===
On 17 June 2015, Micromax launched Micromax Canvas Silver 5, which it claimed was the world's slimmest telephone. The company is an official Windows Phone 8.1 hardware partner. In June 2014, it launched two Windows smartphones, the Micromax Canvas Win W092 and the Micromax Canvas Win W121.

=== Canvas Amaze 2 ===
On 8 June 2015, Micromax announced the launch of Micromax Amaze 2. The device has a 5-inch IPS display with a 1280 × 720 pixels resolution. The smartphone is powered by a 1.4 GHz quad-core Snapdragon processor with 2 GB of RAM and 16 GB of internal storage.

=== Canvas Unite 4 and Canvas Unite 4 Pro ===
A year later, Micromax announced the launch of Micromax Canvas Unite 4 and Canvas Unite 4 Pro. Both these smartphones run on Indus OS 2.0. The Canvas Unite 4 is powered by a 1.0 GHz quad-core processor with 1 GB RAM. The Micromax Canvas Unite 4 Pro had more powerful specifications, featuring a 1.3 GHz quad-core processor with 2 GB RAM.

=== Canvas Mega 2 ===
In 2016, Micromax Canvas Mega 2 was launched and shipped.

=== Bharat series ===
Micromax has rolled out basic smartphones with 4G capabilities under the Bharat series. So far, the company has already launched Bharat 2.

=== Dual 4 & Dual 5 ===
Micromax has announced the entry of Micromax Dual 5 and Micromax Dual 4 in India.

=== Canvas Infinity ===
Later in August 2017, Micromax launched its first bezel-less smartphone with an 18:9 aspect ratio. This device, called Canvas Infinity, still fell within the budget category.

=== Infinity N11 ===
In December 2018, Micromax launched the Infinity N11 smartphone.

=== YU ACE TV ===
Following the latest 18:9 trend, the smartphone features a 5.4-inch HD+ Full View display with a 720p resolution. Powered by a 1.5 GHz quad-core MediaTek 6739 processor, the device runs on the latest Android Oreo operating system. Furthermore, backed up by 2 GB RAM + 16 GB internal storage, the handset will later be launched in 3 GB RAM + 32 GB storage variants as well.

=== Canvas 3 TV ===
Running Android Nougat OS, Micromax Canvas 3 allows media sharing and wireless smartphone control. The TV is available in 32-inch, 40-inch, and 50-inch screen sizes.

=== IN Series ===
Micromax launched its IN Series on 2020 with the introduction of two models IN 1B and IN Note 1. They promised two years of Android Security Updates and assured to always use Clean Stock Android in this Series.

Name	SOC	CPU cores	GPU	RAM	Storage	Cameras	Display	OS(Launch)
IN 1B	Mediatek Helio G35	8x ARM Cortex A53 @ 2.3 GHz	IMG PowerVR GE8320 @ 680 MHz	2 GB/4 GB LPDDR4X	32 GB/64 GB eMMC5.1	Rear:13+2 MP Front:8 MP	6.52 inch IPS LCD HD+ 720x1600	Stock Android 10(Q) for the 4 GB RAM variant ( Upgradeable to Android 11 ) Stock Android 10(Q) Go Edition for the 2 GB RAM variant ( Upgradeable to Android 11 )
IN Note 1	Mediatek Helio G85	Total: 8 2x ARM Cortex A75 @ 2.0 GHz 6x ARM Cortex A55 @ 1.8 GHz	ARM Mali-G52 MC2 @ 1 GHz	4 GB LPDDR4X	64 GB/128 GB eMMC5.1	Rear:48+5+2+2 MP Front:16 MP	6.67 inch IPS LCD FHD+ 1080x2400	Stock Android 10(Q)
IN 1	Mediatek Helio G80	Total: 8 2x ARM Cortex A75 @ 2.0 GHz 6x ARM Cortex A55 @ 1.8 GHz	ARM Mali-G52 MC2 @ 950 MHz	4 GB/6 GB LPDDR4X	64 GB/128 GB eMMC5.1	Rear:48+2+2 MP Front:8 MP	6.67 inch IPS LCD FHD+ 1080x2400	Stock Android 10(Q)
IN 2B	UNISOC Tiger T610	Total: 8 2x ARM Cortex A75 @ 1.8 GHz 6x ARM Cortex A55 @ 1.8 GHz	ARM Mali-G52 3EE (2-cores) @ 614.4 MHz	4 GB/6 GB LPDDR4X	64 GB eMMC5.1	Rear:13+2 MP Samsung Sensor Front:5 MP	6.52 inch IPS LCD HD+ 720x1600	Stock Android 11(R)
IN Note 2	Mediatek Helio G95	Total: 8 2x ARM Cortex A76 @ 2.05 GHz 6x ARM Cortex A55 @ 2.0 GHz	ARM Mali G76 MC4 (2-Cores) @ 900 MHz	4 GB LPDDR4X	64 GB UFS2.1	Rear:48+5+2+2 MP Front:16 MP	6.43 inch AMOLED FHD+ 1080x2400	Stock Android 11

== Manufacturing in India ==
=== Products manufactured ===
The company's main products include mobile phones, LED TVs, LED lamps, and Tablets. The government would provide Micromax with land to establish a centre capable of producing 10 lakh devices a month, including mobile phones, LED TVs, LED lights, and Tablets. It presently employs 700 people. The firm's first facility in Uttarakhand has a capacity to produce 16 lakh devices.

=== Manufacturing hubs ===
Micromax operates three factories; in Bhiwadi (Rajasthan), Rudrapur (Uttarakhand), and Telangana. In Bhiwadi, the surface-mount technology (SMT) line is already operational, and trials are running in Rudrapur. For Telangana, the machinery is under import. Altogether, Micromax is expected to establish a capacity of about 30 lakh a month for mobile phones.

=== Manufacturing ===
In April 2014, Micromax began manufacturing LED televisions and tablets at its Rudrapur factory, located in the SIDCUL industrial area. As of August 2015, Micromax was set to start a ₹500 crore (US$53 million) manufacturing plant in Rajasthan's Alwar district after the signing of a Memorandum of Understanding (MoU) between the Government of Rajasthan and Bhagwati Products Ltd.

=== YU Televentures ===
The first product to be launched under a newly floated wholly owned unit, YU Televentures, is a smartphone running on an operating system from US-based Cyanogen Inc. through which Micromax aims to move beyond the business of mobile phone hardware, which has become more or less standardised.

== Projects and partnerships ==
In November 2014, Micromax partnered with Cyanogen Inc. to provide Cyanogen-based smartphones in India, under the brand name YU.

As of 10 April 2016, Micromax announced a strategic partnership with digital payments company TranServ and major global payments technology company Visa to offer the next generation of payment solutions in India.

== Joint ventures ==
In 2024, Micromax Informatics and Phison formed a joint venture business, MiPhi, to design fabless chips with the goal of creating state-of-the-art NAND storage solutions. Micromax owns a majority interest of 55% in the business, while Phison owns the remaining 45%. On February 17, 2025, the MiPhi introduced the Storm 1100X external SSD, its first consumer product, for professionals, gamers, and creators in India.

== Endorsements ==
Actors Akshay Kumar and Twinkle Khanna were the first celebrities to endorse Micromax Mobiles. Hugh Jackman was the brand ambassador of Micromax and appeared in a commercial in 2013 for its first flagship smartphone, the Canvas Turbo A250, and for the Canvas 4 and Canvas Sliver 5 thereafter. In July 2013, actress Chitrangada Singh posed for the Canvas 4 smartphone in New Delhi. Vighnesh Pande endorsed Micromax Canvas Unite 4 line of smartphones in 2017.

== Key awards and achievements ==
In 2011, Micromax was recognized as an Emerging Company of the Year by V&D 100 Awards.

In 2017, Rahul Sharma was conferred the Transformational Business Leader of the Year.

== Controversies ==
=== Patent litigation ===
In March 2013, Ericsson sued Micromax for infringement of Ericsson's eight patents registered in India that were essential to the 2G and 3G standards. The Delhi High Court ordered Micromax to pay royalty amounts to Ericsson based on the percentages of the net selling prices of the devices incorporating 2G and 3G standards. Around the time that Ericsson filed its patent infringement suit, Micromax filed a concurrent complaint with the Competition Commission of India (CCI), alleging that Ericsson had abused its allegedly dominant position by imposing exorbitant royalties for the use of its SEPs, thus violating the Competition Act of 2002. As of February 2016, the CCI had yet to issue a final determinative ruling on the basis of Micromax's allegations.

In late 2014, the Delhi High Court ruled that sales of the OnePlus One smartphone were blocked in India because Cyanogen OS signed an exclusive deal to sell Micromax mobile telephones only in India, although OnePlus One had a worldwide licensing deal. This move was seen as a monopoly to stem the sales of OnePlus One and other smartphone brands. However, the High Court lifted the ban, allowing OnePlus One to be sold in India as the licensing deals with Cyanogen are different for both parties.

=== Stealthy installation of adware ===
In early 2015, a Reddit user found adware stealthily installing itself on their Micromax Canvas Fire A093 telephone without permission. Afterwards, it was revealed that the adware also consumed excessive phone resources, including data, memory storage, and battery life. Further investigations by the XDA community found the advertisements were created by Adups, an AdPush company based in China.

== See also ==
- YU Televentures
- Electronics and semiconductor manufacturing industry in India
