= Comparison of Android Go products =

Android Go products were first showcased at MWC 2018 with six products: Nokia 1, ZTE Tempo Go, Alcatel 1X, General Mobile GM8 Go, Lava Z50, and Micromax Bharat Go. The Blu Vivo Go became the first Android Go device with Android Pie Go edition.

== Smartphones ==
Brand	Model	Android Go version	Date announced	Height	Width	Thickness	Weight	Display diagonal size	Display aspect ratio	Display resolution	Display pixel per Inch	Internal storage	Memory	Rear camera megapixel	Front camera megapixel	Processor	Graphics processing unit	Battery capacity
Alcatel	1	8.1	June 2018	137.6 mm (5.42 in)	65.7 mm (2.59 in)	9.8 mm (0.39 in)	134 g (4.7 oz)	5.0 in	18:9	960 x 480	215 ppi	8 GB	1 GB	5 MP	2 MP	Mediatek MT6739	PowerVR GE8100	2000 mAh
Alcatel	1 (2021)	11	June 2021	137.6 mm (5.42 in)	65.7 mm (2.59 in)	9.8 mm (0.39 in)	134 g (4.7 oz)	5.0 in	18:9	960 x 480	215 ppi	8 GB	1 GB	5 MP	2 MP	Mediatek MT6739	PowerVR GE8100	2000 mAh
Alcatel	1B (2020)	10	January 2020	146.1 mm (5.75 in)	71.6 mm (2.82 in)	9.9 mm (0.39 in)	168 g (5.9 oz)	5.5 in	18:9	1440 x 720	293 ppi	16 or 32 GB	2 GB	8 MP	5 MP	Qualcomm Snapdragon 215	Adreno 308	3000 mAh
Alcatel	1B (2022)	11	May 2022	146.7 mm (5.78 in)	71.9 mm (2.83 in)	10 mm (0.39 in)	172 g (6.1 oz)	5.5 in	18:9	1440 x 720	293 ppi	32 GB	2 GB	8 MP	5 MP	MediaTek Helio A22	PowerVR GE8320	3000 mAh
Alcatel	1C (2019)	8.1	January 2019	136.6 mm (5.38 in)	65.3 mm (2.57 in)	10 mm (0.39 in)	148 g (5.2 oz)	5.0 in	18:9	960 x 480	215 ppi	8 GB	1 GB	5 MP	2 MP	Spreadtrum SC7731E	Mali-T820 MP1	2000 mAh
Alcatel	1L (2021)	11	January 2021	155.9 mm (6.14 in)	74.5 mm (2.93 in)	9.9 mm (0.39 in)	179 g (6.3 oz)	6.1 in	19.5:9	1560 x 720	282 ppi	32 GB	2 GB	13 MP + 2 MP	5 MP	MediaTek Helio A20	PowerVR GE8320	3000 mAh
Alcatel	1L Pro	11	June 2021	156.4 mm (6.16 in)	74.8 mm (2.94 in)	9.7 mm (0.38 in)	190 g (6.7 oz)	6.1 in	19.5:9	1560 x 720	282 ppi	32 GB	2 GB	13 MP + 2 MP	5 MP	Unisoc SC9863A	Mali-G52 MC2	3000 mAh
Alcatel	1V	9	September 2019	149.1 mm (5.87 in)	72.2 mm (2.84 in)	8.9 mm (0.35 in)	153.2 g (5.40 oz)	5.5 in	18:9	960 x 480	195 ppi	16 GB	1, 2 or 3 GB	5 or 8 MP	5 MP	Unisoc SC9863A	Mali-G52 MC2	2460 mAh
Alcatel	1V (2021)	11	February 2021	165.2 mm (6.50 in)	75.5 mm (2.97 in)	8.9 mm (0.35 in)	190 g (6.7 oz)	6.52 in	20:9	1600 x 720	269 ppi	32 or 64 GB	2 GB	13 MP + 2 MP + 2 MP	5 MP	MediaTek Helio A22	PowerVR GE8320	5000 mAh
Alcatel	1X	8.1	February 2018	147.5 mm (5.81 in)	70.6 mm (2.78 in)	9.1 mm (0.36 in)	151 g (5.3 oz)	5.3 in	18:9	960 x 480	203 ppi	16 GB	1 GB	8 MP f/2.0	5 MP f/2.2	Mediatek MT6739	PowerVR GE8100	2460 mAh
Blackview	A20	8.1	April 2018	146.7 mm (5.78 in)	70.7 mm (2.78 in)	9.6 mm (0.38 in)	170 g (6.0 oz)	5.5 in	18:9	960 x 480	195 ppi	8 GB	1 GB	5 MP + 0.3 MP	2 MP	MediaTek MT6580M	Mali-400 MP2	3000 mAh
BLU	Vivo Go	9	December 2018	156.7 mm (6.17 in)	75.2 mm (2.96 in)	8.4 mm (0.33 in)	155 g (5.5 oz)	6.0 in	18:9	1440 x 720	268 ppi	16 GB	1 GB	8 MP + VGA	5 MP	Mediatek MT6739	PowerVR GE8100	2600 mAh
Evercoss	S45B (Xtream 2)	8.1	April 2018	139.6 mm (5.50 in)	68.5 mm (2.70 in)	11 mm (0.43 in)	129.5 g (4.57 oz)	4.5 in	16:9	854 x 480	217 ppi	16 GB	1 GB	5 MP	2 MP	Unisoc SC9832E	Mali-T820 MP1	1700 mAh
General Mobile	GM8 Go	8.1	February 2018	150 mm (5.9 in)	70.5 mm (2.78 in)	8.6 mm (0.34 in)	152 g (5.4 oz)	5.5 in	18:9	1440 x 720	293 ppi	16 GB	1 GB	13 MP f/2.0	5 MP f/2.2	Mediatek MT6739	PowerVR GE8100	3500 mAh
HMD	Key	14	January 2025	166.4 mm (6.55 in)	76.9 mm (3.03 in)	9 mm (0.35 in)	185.4 g (6.54 oz)	6.52 in	20:9	1280 x 576	215 ppi	32 GB	2 GB	8 MP	5 MP	Unisoc SC9832E	Mali-T820 MP1	4000 mAh
Honor	X5	12	January 2023	164 mm (6.5 in)	75.6 mm (2.98 in)	8.9 mm (0.35 in)	193 g (6.8 oz)	6.5 in	20:9	1600 x 720	270 ppi	32 GB	2 GB	8 MP	5 MP	MediaTek Helio G25	PowerVR GE8320	5000 mAh
Honor	Play10	15	September 2025	167.7 mm (6.60 in)	77.7 mm (3.06 in)	8.6 mm (0.34 in)	189 g (6.7 oz)	6.74 in	20:9	1600 x 720	260 ppi	64 or 128 GB	3 or 4 GB	13 MP	5 MP	MediaTek Helio G81	Mali-G52 MC2	5000 mAh
Huawei	Y3 2018	8.1	May 2018	145.1 mm (5.71 in)	73.7 mm (2.90 in)	9.5 mm (0.37 in)	175 g (6.2 oz)	5.0 in	16:9	854 x 480	196 ppi	8 GB	1 GB	8 MP f/2.0	2 MP	Mediatek MT6737M	Mali-T720MP2	2280 mAh
Huawei	Y5 lite (2018)	8.1	December 2018	145.6 mm (5.73 in)	70.9 mm (2.79 in)	8.3 mm (0.33 in)	142 g (5.0 oz)	5.45 in	18:9	1440 x 720	295 ppi	16 GB	1 GB	8 MP f/2.0	5 MP f/2.2	MediaTek MT6739	PowerVR GE8100	3020 mAh
Infinix	Smart 8 Pro	13	January 2024	163.6 mm (6.44 in)	75.6 mm (2.98 in)	8.5 mm (0.33 in)	189 g (6.7 oz)	6.6 in	20:9	1612 x 720	267 ppi	64 or 128 GB	3, 4 or 8 GB	13 MP	8 MP	MediaTek Helio G36	PowerVR GE8320	5000 mAh
Infinix	Smart 9 HD	14	December 2024	165.7 mm (6.52 in)	77.1 mm (3.04 in)	8.4 mm (0.33 in)	188 g (6.6 oz)	6.7 in	20:9	1612 x 720	267 ppi	64 GB	3 or 4 GB	13 MP	8 MP	MediaTek Helio G50	Mali-G57 MC1	5000 mAh
itel	P55T	14	December 2023	164 mm (6.5 in)	76 mm (3.0 in)	9.2 mm (0.36 in)	?	6.56 in	20:9	1612 x 720	267 ppi	128 GB	4 GB	50 MP	8 MP	Unisoc T606	Mali-G52 3EE	6000 mAh
Lava	Z50	8.1	February 2018	135 mm (5.3 in)	66.6 mm (2.62 in)	9.7 mm (0.38 in)	140 g (4.9 oz)	4.5 in	16:9	854 x 480	218 ppi	8 GB	1 GB	5 MP	5 MP	Mediatek MT6737M	Mali-T720MP2	2000 mAh
Leagoo	M10	8.1	May 2019	146.4 mm (5.76 in)	70.8 mm (2.79 in)	9.8 mm (0.39 in)	160 g (5.6 oz)	5.5 in	18:9	1440 x 720	293 ppi	16 GB	1 GB	8 MP	5 MP	MediaTek MT6739	PowerVR GE8100	2850 mAh
Leagoo	Z9	8.1	October 2018	136.5 mm (5.37 in)	72.3 mm (2.85 in)	10.4 mm (0.41 in)	?	5.0 in	16:9	854 x 480	196 ppi	16 GB	1 GB	5 MP	2 MP	MediaTek MT6580	Mali-400	2000 mAh
LG	K20 (2019)	9	August 2019	148.6 mm (5.85 in)	71.9 mm (2.83 in)	8.3 mm (0.33 in)	152 g (5.4 oz)	5.45 in	18:9	960 x 480	197 ppi	16 GB	1 GB	8 MP f/2.0	5 MP f/2.2	MediaTek MT6739	PowerVR GE8100	3000 mAh
Micromax	Bharat Go	8.1	February 2018	136.5 mm (5.37 in)	67 mm (2.6 in)	9.6 mm (0.38 in)	130 g (4.6 oz)	4.5 in	16:9	854 x 480	218 ppi	8 GB	1 GB	5 MP	5 MP	Mediatek MT6737M	Mali-T720MP1	2000 mAh
Motorola	E5 Play (Europe)	8.1	July 2018	?	?	7.6 mm (0.30 in)	150.3 g (5.30 oz)	5.84 in	18:9	960 x 480	184 ppi	16 GB	1 GB	8 MP f/2.0	5 MP	Qualcomm Snapdragon 425	Adreno 308	2100 mAh
Motorola	E6i	10	February 2021	155.6 mm (6.13 in)	73 mm (2.9 in)	8.5 mm (0.33 in)	160 g (5.6 oz)	6.1 in	19.5:9	1560 x 720	282 ppi	32 GB	2 GB	13 MP + 2 MP	5 MP	Unisoc SC9863A	IMG8322	3000 mAh
Motorola	E22i	12	September 2022	163.6 mm (6.44 in)	74.7 mm (2.94 in)	8 mm (0.31 in)	169 g (6.0 oz)	6.5 in	20:9	1600 x 720	270 ppi	32 GB	2 GB	16 MP + 2 MP	5 MP	MediaTek Helio G37	PowerVR GE8320	4020 mAh
Motorola	E13	13	January 2023	164.2 mm (6.46 in)	75 mm (3.0 in)	8.5 mm (0.33 in)	179.5 g (6.33 oz)	6.5 in	20:9	1600 x 720	270 ppi	32, 64 or 128 GB	2, 4 or 8 GB	13 MP	5 MP	Unisoc T606	Mali-G52 3EE	5000 mAh
Motorola	E14	14	June 2024	163.5 mm (6.44 in)	75.4 mm (2.97 in)	8 mm (0.31 in)	178.8 g (6.31 oz)	6.56 in	20:9	1612 x 720	269 ppi	64 GB	2 GB	13 MP	5 MP	Unisoc T606	Mali-G52 3EE	5000 mAh
Motorola	E15	14	December 2024	165.7 mm (6.52 in)	76 mm (3.0 in)	8.2 mm (0.32 in)	188.8 g (6.66 oz)	6.67 in	20:9	1604 x 720	264 ppi	64 GB	2 GB	32 MP f/2.2	8 MP f/2.1	MediaTek Helio G81 Extreme	Mali-G52 MC2	5200 mAh
Nokia	1 Plus	9 (Upgradable to 10)	February 2019	145 mm (5.7 in)	70.4 mm (2.77 in)	8.6 mm (0.34 in)	138.4 g (4.88 oz)	5.45 in	18:9	960 x 480	197 ppi	8 or 16 GB	1 GB	8 MP	5 MP	MediaTek MT6739WW	PowerVR GE8100	2500 mAh
Nokia	1.3	10	March 2020	147.3 mm (5.80 in)	71.2 mm (2.80 in)	9.4 mm (0.37 in)	155 g (5.5 oz)	5.71 in	19:9	1520 x 720	295 ppi	16 GB	1 GB	8 MP	5 MP	Qualcomm Snapdragon 215	Adreno 308	3000 mAh
Nokia	1	8.1 (Upgradable to 10)	February 2018	133.6 mm (5.26 in)	67.8 mm (2.67 in)	9.5 mm (0.37 in)	131 g (4.6 oz)	4.5 in	16:9	854 x 480	218 ppi	8 GB	1 GB	5 MP	2 MP	Mediatek MT6737M	Mali-T720MP1	2150 mAh
Nokia	2.1	8.1 (Upgradable to 10)	May 2018	153.6 mm (6.05 in)	77.6 mm (3.06 in)	9.7 mm (0.38 in)	174 g (6.1 oz)	5.5 in	16:9	1280 x 720	267 ppi	8 GB	1 GB	8 MP	5 MP	Qualcomm Snapdragon 425	Adreno 308	4000 mAh
Nokia	C1	9	December 2019	147.6 mm (5.81 in)	71.4 mm (2.81 in)	8.7 mm (0.34 in)	174 g (6.1 oz)	5.45 in	18:9	960 x 480	197 ppi	16 GB	1 GB	5 MP	5 MP	Quad-core 1.3 GHz	?	2500 mAh
Nokia	C2	9	March 2020	154.8 mm (6.09 in)	75.6 mm (2.98 in)	8.9 mm (0.35 in)	161 g (5.7 oz)	5.7 in	18:9	1440 x 720	282 ppi	16 GB	1 GB	5 MP	5 MP	Unisoc SC9832E	Mali-T820 MP1	2800 mAh
Nokia	1.4	10 (Upgradable to 11)	February 2021	166.4 mm (6.55 in)	76.7 mm (3.02 in)	8.7 mm (0.34 in)	178 g (6.3 oz)	6.52 in	20:9	1600 x 720	269 ppi	16, 32 or 64 GB	1, 2 or 3 GB	8 MP + 2 MP	5 MP	Qualcomm Snapdragon 215	Adreno 308	4000 mAh
Nokia	C01 Plus	11	June 2021	148 mm (5.8 in)	71.8 mm (2.83 in)	9.3 mm (0.37 in)	157 g (5.5 oz)	5.45 in	18:9	1440 x 720	295 ppi	16 GB	1 GB	5 MP	5 MP	Unisoc SC9863A	Mali-G52 MC2	3000 mAh
Nokia	C02	12	February 2023	148.7 mm (5.85 in)	71.2 mm (2.80 in)	10 mm (0.39 in)	191 g (6.7 oz)	5.45 in	18:9	1440 x 720	295 ppi	32 GB	2 GB	5 MP	2 MP	Quad-core 1.4 GHz	?	3000 mAh
Nokia	C1 second Edition	11	July 2021	148 mm (5.8 in)	71.8 mm (2.83 in)	9.3 mm (0.37 in)	154 g (5.4 oz)	5.45 in	18:9	1440 x 720	295 ppi	16 GB	1 GB	5 MP	5 MP	Unisoc SC7331E	Mali-400 MP2	2500 mAh
Nokia	C1 Plus	10	December 2020	149.1 mm (5.87 in)	71.2 mm (2.80 in)	8.8 mm (0.35 in)	146 g (5.1 oz)	5.45 in	18:9	1440 x 720	295 ppi	16 GB	1 GB	5 MP	5 MP	Quad-core 1.4 GHz	?	2500 mAh
Nokia	C10	11	April 2021	169.9 mm (6.69 in)	77.9 mm (3.07 in)	8.8 mm (0.35 in)	191 g (6.7 oz)	6.52 in	20:9	1600 x 720	269 ppi	16 or 32 GB	1 or 2 GB	5 MP	5 MP	Unisoc SC7331E	Mali-400 MP2	3000 mAh
Nokia	C12	12	January 2023	166.6 mm (6.56 in)	74.3 mm (2.93 in)	8.8 mm (0.35 in)	177.4 g (6.26 oz)	6.3 in	20:9	1600 x 720	278 ppi	64 GB	2 or 3 GB	8 MP	5 MP	Unisoc SC9863A1	IMG8322	3000 mAh
Nokia	C12 Pro	12	March 2023	166.6 mm (6.56 in)	74.3 mm (2.93 in)	8.8 mm (0.35 in)	177.4 g (6.26 oz)	6.3 in	20:9	1600 x 720	278 ppi	64 GB	2 or 3 GB	8 MP	5 MP	Unisoc SC9863A1	IMG8322	4000 mAh
Nokia	C12 Plus	12	April 2023	166.6 mm (6.56 in)	74.3 mm (2.93 in)	8.8 mm (0.35 in)	177.4 g (6.26 oz)	6.3 in	20:9	1600 x 720	278 ppi	32 GB	2 GB	8 MP	5 MP	Unisoc SC9863A1	IMG8322	4000 mAh
Nokia	C2 second Edition	11	February 2022	154 mm (6.1 in)	75.9 mm (2.99 in)	10 mm (0.39 in)	180 g (6.3 oz)	5.7 in	18:9	960 x 480	188 ppi	32 GB	1 or 2 GB	5 MP	2 MP	Quad-core 1.5 GHz	?	2400 mAh
Nokia	C20 Plus	11	June 2021	165.4 mm (6.51 in)	75.9 mm (2.99 in)	9.4 mm (0.37 in)	205 g (7.2 oz)	6.5 in	20:9	1600 x 720	270 ppi	32 GB	3 GB	8 MP + 2 MP	5 MP	Unisoc SC9863A	Mali-G52 MC2	4950 mAh
Nokia	C20	11	April 2021	169.9 mm (6.69 in)	77.9 mm (3.07 in)	8.8 mm (0.35 in)	191 g (6.7 oz)	6.52 in	20:9	1600 x 720	269 ppi	16 or 32 GB	1 or 2 GB	5 MP	5 MP	Unisoc SC9863A	Mali-G52 MC2	3000 mAh
Nokia	C21 Plus	11	February 2022	164.8 mm (6.49 in)	75.9 mm (2.99 in)	8.6 mm (0.34 in)	178 g (6.3 oz)	6.52 in	20:9	1600 x 720	269 ppi	32 or 64 GB	2, 3 or 4 GB	13 MP + 2 MP	5 MP	Unisoc SC9863A	IMG8322	4000 or 5050 mAh
Nokia	C21	11	February 2022	169.9 mm (6.69 in)	77.9 mm (3.07 in)	8.8 mm (0.35 in)	195 g (6.9 oz)	6.52 in	20:9	1600 x 720	269 ppi	32 or 64 GB	2 or 3 GB	8 MP	5 MP	Unisoc SC9863A	IMG8322	3000 mAh
Nokia	C22	13	February 2023	164.6 mm (6.48 in)	75.9 mm (2.99 in)	8.6 mm (0.34 in)	190 g (6.7 oz)	6.5 in	20:9	1600 x 720	270 ppi	64 GB	2 or 3 GB	13 MP + 2 MP	8 MP	Unisoc SC9863A	IMG8322	5000 mAh
Nokia	C30	11	July 2021	177.7 mm (7.00 in)	79.1 mm (3.11 in)	9.9 mm (0.39 in)	237 g (8.4 oz)	6.82 in	20:9	1600 x 720	257 ppi	32 or 64 GB	2 or 3 GB	13 MP + 2 MP	5 MP	Unisoc SC9863A	IMG8322	6000 mAh
realme	C11 2021	11	June 2021	165.2 mm (6.50 in)	76.4 mm (3.01 in)	8.9 mm (0.35 in)	190 g (6.7 oz)	6.5 in	20:9	1600 x 720	270 ppi	32 GB	2 GB	8 MP	5 MP	Unisoc SC9863A	IMG8322	5000 mAh
realme	C30	11	June 2022	164.1 mm (6.46 in)	75.6 mm (2.98 in)	8.5 mm (0.33 in)	182 g (6.4 oz)	6.5 in	20:9	1600 x 720	270 ppi	32 GB	2 or 3 GB	8 MP	5 MP	Unisoc T612	Mali-G57	5000 mAh
realme	narzo 50i Prime	11	June 2022	164.1 mm (6.46 in)	75.6 mm (2.98 in)	8.5 mm (0.33 in)	182 g (6.4 oz)	6.5 in	20:9	1600 x 720	270 ppi	32 or 64 GB	3 or 4 GB	8 MP	5 MP	Unisoc T612	Mali-G57	5000 mAh
Redmi	A1	12	September 2022	164.9 mm (6.49 in)	76.5 mm (3.01 in)	9.1 mm (0.36 in)	192 g (6.8 oz)	6.52 in	20:9	1600 x 720	269 ppi	32 GB	2 or 3 GB	8 MP + QVGA	5 MP	MediaTek Helio A22	PowerVR GE8320	5000 mAh
Redmi	A1+	12	September 2022	164.9 mm (6.49 in)	76.5 mm (3.01 in)	9.1 mm (0.36 in)	192 g (6.8 oz)	6.52 in	20:9	1600 x 720	269 ppi	32 GB	2 or 3 GB	8 MP + QVGA	5 MP	MediaTek Helio A22	PowerVR GE8320	5000 mAh
Redmi	A2	13	March 2023	164.9 mm (6.49 in)	76.5 mm (3.01 in)	9.1 mm (0.36 in)	192 g (6.8 oz)	6.52 in	20:9	1600 x 720	269 ppi	32 GB	2 or 3 GB	8 MP + QVGA	5 MP	MediaTek Helio G36	PowerVR GE8320	5000 mAh
Redmi	A2+	13	March 2023	164.9 mm (6.49 in)	76.5 mm (3.01 in)	9.1 mm (0.36 in)	192 g (6.8 oz)	6.52 in	20:9	1600 x 720	269 ppi	32 GB	2 or 3 GB	8 MP + QVGA	5 MP	MediaTek Helio G36	PowerVR GE8320	5000 mAh
Redmi	A5	15	March 2025	171.7 mm (6.76 in)	77.8 mm (3.06 in)	8.3 mm (0.33 in)	193 g (6.8 oz)	6.88 in	20.5:9	1640 x 720	260 ppi	64 or 128 GB	4 or 6 GB	32 MP f/1.8 + QVGA	8 MP f/2.0	Unisoc T7250	Mali-G57 MP1	5200 mAh
Samsung	Galaxy J2 Core	8.1	August 2018	143.4 mm (5.65 in)	72.1 mm (2.84 in)	8.9 mm (0.35 in)	154 g (5.4 oz)	5.0 in	16:9	960 x 540	220 ppi	8 or 16 GB	1 GB	8 MP f/2.2	5 MP f/2.2	Samsung Exynos 7570 Quad	Mali-T720 MP1	2600 mAh
Samsung	Galaxy A01 Core	10	July 2020	141.7 mm (5.58 in)	67.5 mm (2.66 in)	8.6 mm (0.34 in)	150 g (5.3 oz)	5.3 in	18.5:9	1480 x 720	311 ppi	16 or 32 GB	1 or 2 GB	8 MP	5 MP	MediaTek MT6739WW	PowerVR GE8100	3000 mAh
Samsung	Galaxy A03 Core	11 (Upgradable to 13)	November 2021	164.2 mm (6.46 in)	75.9 mm (2.99 in)	9.1 mm (0.36 in)	211 g (7.4 oz)	6.5 in	20:9	1600 x 720	270 ppi	32 GB	2 GB	8 MP	5 MP	Unisoc SC9863A	IMG8322	5000 mAh
Samsung	Galaxy A2 Core	8.1	April 2019	141.6 mm (5.57 in)	71 mm (2.8 in)	9.1 mm (0.36 in)	142 g (5.0 oz)	5 in	16:9	960 x 540	220 ppi	8 or 16 GB	1 GB	5 MP	5 MP	Exynos 7870 Octa	Mali-T830 MP1	2600 mAh
Samsung	Galaxy J4 Core	8.1	November 2018	160.6 mm (6.32 in)	76.1 mm (3.00 in)	7.99 mm (0.315 in)	177 g (6.2 oz)	6.0 in	18.5:9	1480 x 720	274 ppi	16 GB	1 GB	8 MP f/2.2	5 MP f/2.2	Qualcomm Snapdragon 425	Adreno 308	3300 mAh
TCL	TCL 501	14	February 2024	156.5 mm (6.16 in)	74.9 mm (2.95 in)	9.7 mm (0.38 in)	178.5 g (6.30 oz)	6.0 in	18:9	1092 x 540	203 ppi	32 GB	2 GB	5 MP	2 MP	?	IMG GE8320	3000 mAh
Tecno	Spark Go Plus	9	January 2020	?	?	?	?	6.52 in	20:9	1600 x 720	269 ppi	32 GB	2 GB	8 MP	8 MP	MediaTek Helio A22	PowerVR GE8300	4000 mAh
Tecno	Spark 5 Air	10	May 2020	174.6 mm (6.87 in)	79.2 mm (3.12 in)	9 mm (0.35 in)	?	7.0 in	20.5:9	1640 x 720	256 ppi	32 GB	2 GB	13 MP + QVGA	8 MP f/2.0	Quad-core	?	5000 mAh
Tecno	Spark 6 Go	10	November 2020	165.6 mm (6.52 in)	76.3 mm (3.00 in)	9.1 mm (0.36 in)	?	6.52 in	20:9	1600 x 720	269 ppi	32 or 64 GB	2, 3 or 4 GB	13 MP + QVGA	8 MP	MediaTek Helio A20 / A25	PowerVR GE8320	5000 mAh
Tecno	Spark Go 2020	10	September 2020	165.6 mm (6.52 in)	76.3 mm (3.00 in)	9.1 mm (0.36 in)	?	6.52 in	20:9	1600 x 720	269 ppi	32 GB	2 GB	13 MP + QVGA	8 MP	MediaTek Helio A20	PowerVR GE8300	5000 mAh
Ulefone	Note 7	8.1	April 2019	156.1 mm (6.15 in)	73.7 mm (2.90 in)	9.7 mm (0.38 in)	178 g (6.3 oz)	6.1 in	19.2:9	1280 x 600	232 ppi	32 GB	1 GB	8 MP + 2x 2 MP	5 MP	MediaTek MT6580	Mali-400	3500 mAh
Ulefone	Note 8	10	August 2020	141.7 mm (5.58 in)	66.5 mm (2.62 in)	12 mm (0.47 in)	153 g (5.4 oz)	5.5 in	19.5:9	960 x 442	192 ppi	16 GB	2 GB	5 MP + 2 MP	2 MP	MediaTek MT6580	Mali-400	2700 mAh
Ulefone	S1	8.1	August 2018	148.6 mm (5.85 in)	70.7 mm (2.78 in)	9.6 mm (0.38 in)	183 g (6.5 oz)	5.5 in	18:9	960 x 480	195 ppi	8 GB	1 GB	2x 5 MP	2 MP	MediaTek MT6580	Mali-400	3000 mAh
Umidigi	A7S	10	September 2020	164 mm (6.5 in)	77.1 mm (3.04 in)	9.5 mm (0.37 in)	195 g (6.9 oz)	6.53 in	20:9	1600 x 720	269 ppi	32 GB	2 GB	13 MP + 8 MP + 2 MP	8 MP	MediaTek MT6737	Mali-T720 MP2	4150 mAh
vivo	Y01	11 (Upgradable to 12)	March 2022	164 mm (6.5 in)	75.2 mm (2.96 in)	8.3 mm (0.33 in)	178 g (6.3 oz)	6.51 in	20:9	1600 x 720	270 ppi	32 GB	2 or 3 GB	8 MP or 13 MP	5 MP	MediaTek Helio P35	PowerVR GE8320	5000 mAh
vivo	Y02	12	November 2022	164 mm (6.5 in)	75.6 mm (2.98 in)	8.5 mm (0.33 in)	186 g (6.6 oz)	6.51 in	20:9	1600 x 720	270 ppi	32 GB	2 or 3 GB	8 MP	5 MP	MediaTek Helio P35	PowerVR GE8320	5000 mAh
vivo	Y02A	12	April 2023	164 mm (6.5 in)	75.6 mm (2.98 in)	8.5 mm (0.33 in)	186 g (6.6 oz)	6.51 in	20:9	1600 x 720	270 ppi	32 GB	3 GB	8 MP	5 MP	MediaTek Helio P22	PowerVR GE8320	5000 mAh
vivo	Y15s	11 (Upgradable to 12)	November 2021	164 mm (6.5 in)	75.2 mm (2.96 in)	8.3 mm (0.33 in)	179 g (6.3 oz)	6.51 in	20:9	1600 x 720	270 ppi	32 or 64 GB	3 or 4 GB	13 MP + 2 MP	8 MP	MediaTek Helio P35	PowerVR GE8320	5000 mAh
Wiko	Sunny 3 Plus	8.1	September 2018	148 mm (5.8 in)	72 mm (2.8 in)	9.3 mm (0.37 in)	175 g (6.2 oz)	5.45 in	18:9	960 x 480	197 ppi	8 GB	1 GB	5 MP	2 MP	Quad-Core 1.3 GHz	?	2200 mAh
Xiaomi	Redmi Go	8.1	January 2019	140.1 mm (5.52 in)	70.1 mm (2.76 in)	8.4 mm (0.33 in)	137 g (4.8 oz)	5.0 in	16:9	1280 x 720	294 ppi	8 or 16 GB	1 GB	8 MP f/2.0	5 MP f/2.2	Qualcomm Snapdragon 425	Adreno 308	3000 mAh
ZTE	Avid 589	11	November 2021	142.2 mm (5.60 in)	70.9 mm (2.79 in)	7.9 mm (0.31 in)	167 g (5.9 oz)	5.5 in	18:9	1440 x 720	293 ppi	32 GB	2 GB	8 MP	2 MP	MediaTek Helio P22	PowerVR GE8320	3000 mAh
ZTE	Blade A3 (2019)	9	April 2019	137.4 mm (5.41 in)	67.5 mm (2.66 in)	10.5 mm (0.41 in)	144 g (5.1 oz)	5.0 in	18:9	960 x 480	215 ppi	16 or 32 GB	1 GB	8 MP	5 MP	Unisoc SC9832E	Mali-T820 MP1	2000 mAh
ZTE	Blade A3 Plus	11	January 2022	137 mm (5.4 in)	68 mm (2.7 in)	10.5 mm (0.41 in)	188 g (6.6 oz)	5.0 in	18:9	960 x 480	215 ppi	16 GB	2 GB	5 MP	3 MP	MediaTek MT6737W	PowerVR GE8100	2050 mAh
ZTE	Blade A5 (2020)	10	July 2020	166.7 mm (6.56 in)	72.6 mm (2.86 in)	8 mm (0.31 in)	155 g (5.5 oz)	6.09 in	19.5:9	1560 x 720	282 ppi	32 or 64 GB	2 GB	13 MP + 2 MP	8 MP	Unisoc SC9863A	IMG8322	3200 mAh
ZTE	Blade A31 Lite	11	June 2021	137.3 mm (5.41 in)	67.5 mm (2.66 in)	10.5 mm (0.41 in)	143 g (5.0 oz)	5.0 in	18:9	960 x 480	215 ppi	32 GB	1 GB	5 MP	5 MP	Unisoc SC9832E	Mali-T820 MP1	2000 mAh
ZTE	Blade A34	13	March 2024	164 mm (6.5 in)	75.8 mm (2.98 in)	8.8 mm (0.35 in)	?	6.6 in	20:9	1612 x 720	267 ppi	64 GB	2 GB	8 MP	5 MP	Unisoc SC9863A	IMG8322	5000 mAh
ZTE	Blade L9	11	October 2021	137.5 mm (5.41 in)	67.5 mm (2.66 in)	10 mm (0.39 in)	143 g (5.0 oz)	5.0 in	18:9	960 x 480	215 ppi	32 GB	1 GB	5 MP	2 MP	Unisoc SC7731e	Mali-400 MP2	2000 mAh
ZTE	Quest 5	10	August 2020	137 mm (5.4 in)	68 mm (2.7 in)	10.6 mm (0.42 in)	143 g (5.0 oz)	5.0 in	18:9	960 x 480	215 ppi	16 GB	1 GB	5 MP	2 MP	MediaTek MT6739	PowerVR GE8100	2000 mAh
ZTE	Tempo Go	8.1	February 2018	145.5 mm (5.73 in)	72 mm (2.8 in)	9.2 mm (0.36 in)	?	5.0 in	16:9	854 x 480	196 ppi	8 GB	1 GB	5 MP	2 MP	Qualcomm Snapdragon 210	Adreno 304	2200 mAh

== Tablet computers ==
Brand	Model	Android Go version	Date announced	Height	Width	Thickness	Weight	Display diagonal size	Display aspect ratio	Display resolution	Display pixel per Inch	Internal storage	Memory	Rear camera megapixel	Front camera megapixel	Processor	Graphics processing unit	Battery capacity
Lenovo	Tab E7	8		193.2 mm (7.61 in)	110.5 mm (4.35 in)	10.35 mm (0.407 in)	272 g (9.6 oz)	7.0 in	17:10	1024 x 600	170 ppi	16 GB	1 GB	2 MP	0.3 MP	MediaTek MT8167B	PowerVR GE8300	2750 mAh
Lenovo	Tab E10	8		247 mm (9.7 in)	171 mm (6.7 in)	8.9 mm (0.35 in)	530 g (19 oz)	10.1 in	16:10	1280 x 800	149 ppi	16 GB	2 GB	5 MP	2 MP	Qualcomm Snapdragon 210	Adreno 304	4850 mAh
Lenovo	Tab M7 (3rd Gen)	11	June 2021	176.2 mm (6.94 in)	102.3 mm (4.03 in)	8.3 mm (0.33 in)	237 g (8.4 oz)	7.0 in	17:10	1024 x 600	170 ppi	32 GB	2 GB	2 or 5 MP	2 MP	MediaTek MT8166 / MT8766	PowerVR GE8320	3750 mAh
Lenovo	Tab M8 (3rd Gen)	11	June 2021	199.1 mm (7.84 in)	121.8 mm (4.80 in)	8.15 mm (0.321 in)	305 g (10.8 oz)	8.0 in	16:10	1280 x 800	189 ppi	32 GB	2 GB	5 MP	2 MP	MediaTek Helio P22T	PowerVR GE8320	5000 mAh
