= Nokia C3 (2020) =

2020 smartphone by Nokia

- Brand: Nokia
- Manufacturer: HMD Global
- Type: Smartphone
- Series: C
- First released: August 4, 2020; 5 years ago
- Availability by region: August 13, 2020; 5 years ago
- Successor: Nokia C30
- Related: Nokia C1; Nokia C2 (2020); Nokia C5 Endi
- Compatible networks: GSM, 3G, 4G (LTE)
- Form factor: Monoblock
- Colors: Nordic Blue, Sand Gold
- Dimensions: 159.9×77×8.7 mm (6.30×3.03×0.34 in)
- Weight: 184.5 g (7 oz)
- Operating system: Android 10
- System-on-chip: Unisoc SC9863A (28 nm)
- CPU: Octa-core (4×1.6 GHz Cortex-A55 & 4×1.2 GHz Cortex-A55)
- GPU: IMG8322
- Memory: 16/32 GB, eMMC 5.1
- Storage: 2/3 GB, LPDDR4X
- Removable storage: MicroSDXC up to 128 GB
- SIM: Dual SIM (Nano-SIM)
- Battery: Removable, Li-Ion 3040 mAh
- Charging: 5 W
- Rear camera: 8 MP, f/2.0, AF; LED flash Video: 1080p@30fps
- Front camera: 5 MP, f/2.4 Video: 720p@30fps
- Display: IPS LCD, 5.99", 1440 × 720 (HD+), 18:9, 269 ppi
- Sound: Loudspeaker, Earpiece; 3.5 mm Audio jack
- Connectivity: microUSB 2.0, Bluetooth 4.2 (A2DP), FM radio, Wi-Fi 802.11 a/b/g/n (hotspot), GPS, A-GPS
- Other: Fingerprint sensor (rear-mounted), Accelerometer, Proximity sensor

The Nokia C3 is an entry-level smartphone, developed by HMD Global under the Nokia brand. It was introduced on August 4, 2020 and was released on August 13.

== Design ==
The screen is made of glass and the back case is made of matte plastic.

The microUSB connector and a microphone are located on the bottom. A 3.5 mm audio jack is located on the top. A dedicated button for calling Google Assistant is placed on the left side. The volume control buttons and the smartphone lock button are located on the right side. Slots for 2 SIM cards and a microSD memory card up to 128 GB are located under the removable back panel. The "NOKIA" logo, the fingerprint scanner, and an oval camera block with an LED flash are placed on the back. The earpiece acts as the multimedia speaker and, like the front camera, is located on the display's top bezel on the front.

The Nokia C3 was sold in Nordic Blue and Sand Gold colors.

== Technical specifications ==
=== Hardware ===
The Nokia C3 received a Unisoc SC9863A CPU and an IMG8322 graphics processor. Its battery - is removable and replaceable - has a capacity of 3,040 mAh.

It features an 8 MP main camera, f/2.0 with autofocus and the ability to record video in 1080p@30fps resolution. The front camera received 5 MP resolution, f/2.4 aperture, and the ability to record video in 720p@30fps resolution.

The C3 comes with an IPS LCD display, sizing at 5.99", supporting HD+ (1440 × 720) with an 18:9 aspect ratio and a pixel density of 269 ppi. It was sold in configurations of 2/16, 2/32, and 3/32 GB.

=== Software ===
The smartphone runs on Android 10.
