= Nokia C20 =

2021 Android smartphones

Nokia C20 Nokia C20 Plus
- Brand: Nokia
- Developer: HMD Global
- Manufacturers: C20: MobiWire; C20 Plus: Sprocomm
- Type: Phablet
- Series: C series
- First released: C20: April 8, 2021; 5 years ago C20 Plus: June 11, 2021; 5 years ago
- Predecessor: Nokia 1.4; Nokia C2 (2020)
- Successor: Nokia C21; Nokia C200
- Related: Nokia C01 Plus; Nokia C10; Nokia C30
- Compatible networks: GSM, 3G, 4G, LTE
- Form factor: Slate
- Dimensions: C20: 169.9 × 77.9 × 8.8 mm C20 Plus: 165.4 × 75.9 × 9.4 mm
- Weight: C20: 191 g C20 Plus: 204.7 g
- Operating system: Android 11 (Go Edition)
- CPU: Unisoc SC9863A (28 nm), Octa-core (4×1.6 GHz Cortex-A55 & 4×1.2 GHz Cortex-A55)
- GPU: IMG8322
- Memory: C20: 1/2 GB; C20 Plus: 3 GB; LPDDR4X
- Storage: C20: 16/32 GB; C20 Plus: 32 GB eMMC 5.1
- Removable storage: microSDXC up to 256 GB
- Battery: Removable Li-Ion; C20: 3000 mAh; C20 Plus: 4950 mAh
- Charging: 10W
- Rear camera: C20: 5 MP, f/2.2 C20 Plus: 8 MP + 2 MP, f/2.4 (depth); LED flash, HDR, panorama Video: 720p@30fps
- Front camera: 5 MP, f/2.2 LED flash (C20); Video: 720p@30fps
- Display: IPS LCD, 1600 × 720 (HD+), 20:9; C20: 6.52", 269 ppi C20 Plus: 6.5", 270 ppi
- Connectivity: microUSB 2.0, 3.5 mm jack, Bluetooth 4.2 (A2DP), FM radio, Wi-Fi 802.11 a/b/g/n (hotspot), GPS, A-GPS
- Data inputs: Accelerometer, Proximity sensor

The Nokia C20 and Nokia C20 Plus are budget entry-level Android-based smartphones developed and manufactured by HMD Global under the Nokia brand. The Nokia C20 was announced on April 8, 2021, while the C20 Plus was announced on June 11 of the same year.

In the Philippines, pre-orders for the C20 start from June 7 to 11 and went available in retail stores from June 14 to 20. It was available nationwide on June 14, 2021. The Nokia C20 Plus was also released on August 9, 2021, in India.

== Specifications ==
=== Design & build ===
The display is made of glass with Panda Glass screen protector above the display. The body is constructed from plastic with a wavy texture.

Externally, the Nokia C20 is identical to the Nokia C10, while the Nokia C20 Plus is similar to the Nokia C30.

The bottom features a microUSB port and a microphone. The top houses a 3.5 mm audio jack. On the right side are the volume rockers and the power button. Depending on the version, slots for 1 SIM card and a microSD card (up to 256 GB) or 2 SIM cards and a microSD card are located under the removable back panel. The rear includes a speaker with a protruding "dot" to prevent sound muffled when lying flat, the "NOKIA" logo, and the camera module. The C20 has a circular camera block with an internal LED flash, while the C20 Plus features a circular dual-camera block with an LED flash located to its left. On the front, unlike the C20 Plus, the C20 has larger bezels and an LED flash for the front-facing camera.

The Nokia C20 features a 6.52" IPS LCD display with HD+ resolution (1600 × 720), a 20:9 aspect ratio, a pixel density of 269 ppi, and a waterdrop notch for the front camera.

==== Color options ====
- The Nokia C20 is available in Dark Blue and Sand colors.
- The Nokia C20 Plus is available in Ocean Blue and Graphite Black colors.

=== Hardware ===
The smartphones are powered by the Unisoc SC9863A processor and the IMG8322 GPU. The Nokia C20 features a 3000 mAh battery, while the C20 Plus features a 4950 mAh battery. In both phones, the battery is removable and can be replaced by the user and has 10W wired charging with microUSB.

=== Cameras ===
- The Nokia C20 has a 5 MP, f/2.2 main camera and a 5 MP, f/2.2 front camera.
- The Nokia C20 Plus features a dual main camera setup consisting of an 8 MP and 2 MP, f/2.4 (depth sensor). The front camera has a resolution of 5 MP and an aperture of f/2.2.

Both models' main and front cameras are capable of recording video at 720p@30fps.

The Nokia C20 is available in 1/16 GB, 2/16 GB, and 2/32 GB configurations. The Nokia C20 Plus is available in a 3/32 GB configuration.

=== Software ===
The smartphones were released running Android 11 (Go Edition).
