= Nokia C22 =

Budget entry-level smartphone

- Brand: Nokia
- Developer: HMD Global
- Manufacturer: Sprocomm
- Type: Phablet
- Series: C series
- First released: February 25, 2023; 3 years ago
- Predecessor: Nokia C21
- Successor: HMD Aura
- Related: Nokia C02; Nokia C12; Nokia C32
- Compatible networks: GSM, 3G, 4G (LTE)
- Form factor: Slate
- Colors: Sand, Midnight Black
- Dimensions: 164.6×75.89×8.55 mm (6.480×2.988×0.337 in)
- Weight: 6.7 oz (190 g)
- Operating system: Android 13 (Go edition)
- System-on-chip: UNISOC SC9863A (28 nm)
- CPU: Octa-core (4×1.6 GHz Cortex-A55 & 4×1.2 GHz Cortex-A55)
- GPU: IMG8322
- Memory: 2/3/4 GB LPDDR4X
- Storage: 64/128 GB eMMC 5.1
- Removable storage: microSDXC up to 256 GB
- SIM: Nano-SIM or Dual SIM (Nano-SIM)
- Battery: Non-removable, Li-Ion 5000 mAh
- Charging: 10 W
- Rear camera: 13 MP (wide), AF + 2 MP, f/2.4 (macro); LED flash, HDR; Video: 1080p@30fps
- Front camera: 8 MP; Video: 720p@30fps
- Display: IPS LCD, 6.5", 1600 × 720 (HD+), 20:9, 270 ppi
- Sound: Mono
- Connectivity: USB-C 2.0, 3.5 mm jack, Bluetooth 5.2 (A2DP), FM radio, Wi-Fi 802.11 b/g/n, GPS, A-GPS
- Data inputs: Fingerprint sensor (rear-mounted), accelerometer, proximity
- Water resistance: IP52
- Model: TA-1533, TA-1536, TA-1539, TA-1541, TA-1580
- Codename: Hawkeye
- Website: Official website

The Nokia C22 is an entry-level Android smartphone developed by HMD Global under the Nokia brand. It was announced on February 25, 2023, at MWC 2023 alongside the Nokia C32 and Nokia G22.

== Design & build ==
The display is made of glass. The back and frame is made of plastic with a wavy texture.

Externally, the Nokia C22 is similar to most Nokia smartphones from 2022. The device has protection against splashes and dust according to the IP52 standard.

The USB-C port, speaker, and microphone are located at the bottom. The 3.5 mm audio jack is located at the top. Depending on the model, the left side houses a slot for either one SIM card and a memory card up to 256 GB, or two SIM cards and a memory card. The volume buttons and the lock button are placed on the right side. The Nokia logo, fingerprint scanner, and dual camera unit with LED flash are located on the back.

The Nokia C22 was sold in Sand and Midnight Black color options.

== Technical specifications ==
=== Hardware ===
Like its predecessors, the smartphone features a UNISOC SC9863A SoC processor and an IMG8322 GPU. It also has an octa-core CPU consisting of Cortex-A55 cores clocking at 1.2-1.6 GHz respectively.

=== Battery ===
The battery has a capacity of 5000 mAh and has 10W standard charging. It also supports life enhancement with AI-managed battery life.

=== Camera ===
The smartphone features a 13 MP (wide) main dual camera with autofocus + 2 MP, f/2.4 (macro) capable of recording video at 1080p@30fps. The front camera has a resolution of 8 MP and the ability to record video at 720p@30fps.

=== Display ===
The C22 features a 6.5-inch IPS LCD, HD+ (1600 × 720) with a 20:9 aspect ratio, a pixel density of 270 ppi, and a waterdrop notch for the front camera.

=== Storage ===
The device was sold in 2/64, 3/64, and 4/128 GB configurations with "Virtual RAM" technology. The storage capacity can also be expanded with a microSD card up to 256 GB.

=== Software ===
The Nokia C22 was released pre-installed with Android 13 (Go edition).

== External link ==
- Official website (Ukrainian)
