= Nokia C21 =

2022 Nokia Smartphone

Nokia C21 Nokia C21 Plus
- Brand: Nokia
- Manufacturer: HMD Global
- Type: Phablet
- Series: C series
- First released: February 28, 2022; 4 years ago
- Predecessor: Nokia C20
- Successor: Nokia C22
- Related: Nokia C2 2nd Edition; Nokia C200; Nokia C31; Nokia G11; Nokia G21
- Compatible networks: GSM, 3G, 4G (LTE)
- Form factor: Slate
- Colors: C21: Dark Blue, Warm Gray; C21 Plus: Dark Cyan, Warm Gray
- Dimensions: C21: 169.9 × 77.9 × 8.8 mm C21 Plus: 164.8 × 75.9 × 8.6 mm
- Weight: C21: 195 g C21 Plus: 178 or 191 g
- Operating system: Android 11 (Go edition)
- System-on-chip: Unisoc SC9863A (28 nm), Octa-core (4×1.6 GHz Cortex-A55 & 4×1.2 GHz Cortex-A55)
- GPU: IMG8322
- Memory: C21: 2/3 GB; C21 Plus: 2/3/4 GB; LPDDR4X
- Storage: 32/64 GB, eMMC 5.1
- Removable storage: MicroSDXC up to 256 GB
- Battery: Li-Ion; C21: removable, 3000 mAh; C21 Plus: non-removable, 4000 or 5050 mAh
- Charging: 10 W
- Rear camera: C21: 8 MP; LED flash, HDR, panorama Video: 720p@30fps C21 Plus: 13 MP (wide), AF + 2 MP, f/2.4 (depth); LED flash, HDR, panorama Video: 1080p@30fps
- Front camera: 5 MP, f/2.2 Video: 720p@30fps
- Display: IPS LCD, 6.52", 1600 × 720 (HD+), 20:9, 269 ppi
- Connectivity: microUSB 2.0, 3.5 mm audio jack, Bluetooth 4.2 (A2DP), FM radio, Wi-Fi 802.11 a/b/g/n (hotspot), GPS, A-GPS
- Other: Rear-mounted fingerprint scanner, accelerometer, proximity sensor
- Website: https://www.hmd.com/en_int/nokia-c-21/specs?sku=286716717

The Nokia C21 and Nokia C21 Plus are entry-level smartphones manufactured by HMD Global and branded by Nokia. Both smartphones are announced on February 28, 2022, at MWC 2022 and come with a rear-mounted fingerprint sensor.

== Specifications ==
=== Hardware ===
Both smartphones are powered with the Unisoc SC9863A chipset, 4x1.6 GHz Cortex-A55 and 4x1.2 GHz Cortex-A55 processor and IMG8322 graphics processor. The C21 has a removable Li-lon battery with a capacity of 3000 mAh, while the C21 Plus has a non-removable 4000 or 5050 mAh Li-lon battery.

The camera for both phones differ on the model:

Camera (Main and front)
Nokia C20	Nokia C20 Plus
Design (rear): cricular, centered	Design (rear): rectangular, left-cornered
Main camera: 8 MP with LED flash and HDR	Main camera: 13 MP (wide, auxiliary lens) with autofocus, with LED flash, HDR and panorama and 2 MP depth sensor camera
Video: 720p@30fps	Video: 1080p@30fps
Front camera: 5MP, with LED flash, records up to 720p	Front camera: 5MP, with LED flash, records up to 720p

Both the C20 and C20 Plus feature a 6.52-inch IPS LCD with a resolution of 720 x 1600 (20:9 aspect ratio) and a 269 ppi density. The top middle features a V-shaped front camera notch. A reviewer noticed that putting it to maximum birghtness is not suitable for outdoors.

Both smartphones are sold in 2GB, 3GB and 4GB RAM and 32GB and 64GB internal memory configurations.

=== Software ===
Both smartphones run on Android 11 Go edition.
