= Z50 =

Z50 may refer to:

- German destroyer Z50, a warship
- IBM WorkPad Z50, a handheld PC
- Lava Z50, an Android Go product
- Nikon Z50, a crop-sensor mirrorless camera produced by Nikon
  - Nikon Z50II, a reworked model of the previous
- Small nucleolar RNA Z50
- Z50 designation of the Honda Z series minibike
