= Nokia C32 =

2023 Nokia smartphone

- Brand: Nokia
- Manufacturer: HMD Global
- Type: Phablet
- Series: C series
- First released: February 25, 2023; 3 years ago
- Predecessor: Nokia C31
- Related: Nokia C02; Nokia C12; Nokia C22
- Compatible networks: GSM, 3G, 4G (LTE)
- Form factor: Slate
- Colors: Charcoal, Beach Pink, Autumn Green
- Dimensions: 164.6 × 75.9 × 8.6 mm (6.48 × 2.99 × 0.34 in)
- Weight: 199.4 g (7.02 oz)
- Operating system: Android 13
- System-on-chip: Unisoc SC9863A1 (28 nm)
- CPU: Octa-core (4×1.6 GHz Cortex-A55 & 4×1.2 GHz Cortex-A55)
- GPU: IMG8322
- Memory: 3/4/6 GB LPDDR4X
- Storage: 64/128 GB eMMC 5.1
- Removable storage: MicroSDXC up to 256 GB
- Battery: Non-removable Li-Po 5000 mAh
- Charging: 10 W
- Rear camera: 50 MP (wide), AF + 2 MP, f/2.4 (macro); LED flash, HDR; Video: 1080p@30fps
- Front camera: 8 MP, f/2.2 Video: 720p@30fps
- Display: IPS LCD, 6.5", 1600 × 720 (HD+), 20:9 aspect ratio, 270 ppi
- Sound: Mono speaker
- Connectivity: USB-C 2.0, 3.5 mm jack, Bluetooth 5.2 (A2DP), wireless FM radio, Wi-Fi 802.11 a/b/g/n (hotspot), GPS, A-GPS
- Water resistance: IP52
- Model: TA-1534, TA-1542, TA-1548, TA-1558
- Codename: Mockingbird
- Other: Fingerprint sensor (rear-mounted), accelerometer, proximity sensor
- Website: www.hmd.com/en_int/nokia-c-32

The Nokia C32 is an entry-level Android phablet manufactured HMD Global under the brand Nokia. It was first introduced on 25 February 2023 at MWC 2023 alongside the Nokia C22 and Nokia G22. The C32 runs on Android 13.

== Specifications ==
=== Hardware ===
The C32 is equipped with the Unisoc SC9863A1 processor and IMG8322 GPU. It comes with a 5000 mAh battery. Charging from 0-100% takes approximately 2 hours.

==== Camera ====
The C32 has a main dual camera module featuring with a 50 MP (wide-angle) with autofocus and a 2 MP, f/ 2.4 (macro) and can record a 1080p video @ 30fps. The front camera received a resolution of 8 MP and can record a 720p video @ 30fps.

The Nokia C32 is sold in 3/64, 4/64, 4/128 and 6/128 GB configurations. It is expandable to 256 GB with the microSD memory card.

=== Display ===
The display features a 6.5" in-plane switching LCD, with a resolution at 1600 × 720 (20:9), a 270 ppi pixel density and a teardrop notch of the front camera at the top.
