= Nokia C31 =

2022 Nokia phablet

- Brand: Nokia
- Manufacturer: HMD Global
- Type: Phablet
- Series: C series
- First released: September 1, 2022; 3 years ago
- Predecessor: Nokia C30
- Successor: Nokia C32
- Related: Nokia C21; Nokia G11
- Compatible networks: GSM, 3G, 4G (LTE)
- Form factor: Slate
- Colors: Charcoal, Cyan, Mint
- Dimensions: 168.2×77.98×8.55 mm (6.622×3.070×0.337 in)
- Weight: 200 g (7 oz)
- Operating system: Android 12
- System-on-chip: Unisoc SC9863A (28 nm)
- CPU: 8 cores (4×1.6 GHz Cortex-A55 & 4×1.2 GHz Cortex-A55)
- GPU: IMG8322
- Memory: 3/4 GB LPDDR4X
- Storage: 32/64/128 GB eMMC 5.1
- Removable storage: MicroSDXC up to 256 GB
- Battery: Removable, Li-Ion 5050 mAh
- Charging: 10 W
- Rear camera: 13 MP (wide-angle), AF + 2 MP, f/2.4 (macro) + 2 MP, f/2.4 (depth sensor); LED flash, HDR; Video: 1080p@30fps
- Front camera: 5 MP, f/2.2 Video: 720p@30fps
- Display: IPS LCD, 6.745", 1600 × 720 (HD+), 20:9, 260 ppi
- Sound: Audio: Mono
- Connectivity: microUSB 2.0, 3.5 mm audio jack, Bluetooth 4.2 (A2DP), FM radio, Wi-Fi 802.11 a/b/g/n, GPS, A-GPS, Galileo
- Water resistance: IP52
- Codename: Vision
- Other: Fingerprint scanner (rear-mounted), Accelerometer, Proximity sensor
- Website: Official website

The Nokia C31 is an entry-level phablet developed by HMD Global under the Nokia brand. It was announced on September 1, 2022, along with the Nokia G60 and Nokia X30 phones and the Nokia T21 tablet.

== Design ==
The front is made of glass. The frame is made of matte plastic, and the back panel is made of plastic with a wavy texture.

Nokia C31 looks like most Nokia smartphones of 2022. It features protection against splashes and dust according to the IP52 standard.

At the bottom are a microUSB port and a microphone. At the top is a 3.5 mm audio jack. On the left side, there is a SIM tray for 2 SIM cards and a microSD memory card up to 256 GB. On the right side, there are volume control buttons and a smartphone lock button. On the back, there is a speaker with a protruding dot so that the speaker is not blocked in a lying position, the logo, a fingerprint scanner, and a triple camera unit with an LED flash.

The Nokia C31 was sold in 3 colors: Charcoal (gray), Cyan, and Mint.

== Technical specifications ==
=== Hardware ===
The Nokia C31, like its predecessor, is equipped with the UNISOC SC9863A SoC. The phone was sold in 3/32, 4/64, and 4/128 GB memory configurations.

The battery received a smaller capacity than its predecessor, namely 5050 mAh.

The Nokia C31 features a 6.745-inch IPS LCD display with HD+ (1600 × 720) resolution, an 20:9 aspect ratio, a 260 ppi pixel density and a waterdrop notch for the front-facing camera.

The Nokia C31 features a triple rear camera setup with a 13 MP wide-angle lens with autofocus and 2 MP macro lens and depth sensor. Also, the device features a 5 MP front camera. The rear camera can record video at up to 1080p@30fps, while the front camera can record video at up to 720p@30fps.

=== Software ===
The Nokia C31 runs on Android 12.
