= Nokia C12 =

2023 smartphones branded by Nokia and manufactured by HMD Global

Nokia C12 Nokia C12 Plus Nokia C12 Pro
- Brand: Nokia
- Manufacturer: HMD Global
- Type: Smartphone
- Series: C series
- First released: C12: January 18, 2023; 3 years ago C12 Pro: March 21, 2023; 3 years ago C12 Plus: April 1, 2023; 3 years ago
- Predecessor: Nokia C10
- Successor: HMD Key
- Related: Nokia C02; Nokia C22; Nokia C32
- Compatible networks: GSM, 3G, 4G (LTE)
- Form factor: Slate
- Colors: Charcoal, Dark Cyan, Light Mint
- Dimensions: 166.6×74.3×8.75 mm (6.559×2.925×0.344 in)
- Weight: 177.4 g (6 oz)
- Operating system: Android 12 (Go edition)
- System-on-chip: UNISOC SC9863A1 (28 nm)
- CPU: Octa-core (4×1.6 GHz Cortex-A55 & 4×1.2 GHz Cortex-A55)
- GPU: IMG8322
- Memory: C12/Pro: 2/3 GB; C12 Plus: 2 GB; LPDDR4X
- Storage: C12/Pro: 64 GB; C12 Plus: 32 GB eMMC 5.1
- Removable storage: microSDXC up to 256 GB
- Battery: Removable Li-Ion; C12: 3000 mAh; C12 Plus/Pro: 4000 mAh
- Charging: 10 W
- Rear camera: 8 MP, f/2.2, AF; LED flash, HDR, panorama Video: 720p@30fps
- Front camera: 5 MP, f/2.4 Video: 720p@30fps
- Display: IPS LCD, 6.3", 1600 × 720 (HD+), 20:9, 278 ppi
- Sound: Mono speaker
- Connectivity: microUSB 2.0, 3.5 mm jack, Bluetooth 5.2 (A2DP), wireless FM radio, Wi-Fi 802.11 b/g/n, GPS (A-GPS)
- Data inputs: Touchscreen, microphone, accelerometer, proximity sensor
- Water resistance: IP52
- Website: https://www.hmd.com/en_int/nokia-c-12/?sku=286791567

The Nokia C12 is an entry-level smartphone manufactured by HMD Global under the brand Nokia, introduced on January 18, 2023. On March 21, 2023, in India, the Nokia C12 Pro is announced featuring a larger battery capacity with the Nokia C12 Plus, which is announced on April 1, 2023 with lower internal memory capacity. Both smartphones come with an IP52 water ressistant rating.

In the Philippines, it was released on March 15, 2023 in stores.

== Specifications ==
=== Hardware ===
Specification	C12	C12 Pro	C12 Plus
Color	Dark Cyan, Charcoal, Light Mint		
CPU	Unisoc SC9863A1 (22 nm)		
GPU	4x 1.6 GHz Cortex-A55 & 4x 1.2 GHz Cortex-A55		
Chipset	PowerVR IMG8322		
Battery	3000 mAh	4000 mAh	
Charger	10W, wired		
Internal Memory	64GB of storage		32GB of storage
RAM (random access memory)	2GB and 3GB	2GB, 3GB and 4GB	2GB
	eMMC 5.1		
Display	6.3" IPS LCD, with 720 x 1600 resolution (20:9 ratio) and 278 ppi density		
Main Camera	8MP with PDAF; with an aperture of f/2.2 and Night Mode		
Front Camera	"V" shaped notch, 5MP with an aperture of f/2.4, records up to 720p of resolution and Night Mode		

=== Software ===
Smartphones run on Android 12 (Go edition).
