= Redmi A3 =

2024 smartphone model

Redmi A3/POCO C61 Redmi A3x
- Brand: Redmi/POCO
- Manufacturer: Xiaomi
- Type: Phablet
- Series: Redmi A POCO C
- First released: A3: February 14, 2024; 2 years ago POCO C61: March 26, 2024; 2 years ago A3x: May 24, 2024; 2 years ago
- Predecessor: Redmi A2
- Successor: Redmi A4 5G; POCO C71
- Related: Redmi A3 Pro; POCO C65
- Compatible networks: GSM, 3G, 4G (LTE)
- Form factor: Slab
- Colors: A3: Midnight Black; Forest/Olive Green; Star/Lake Blue; POCO C61: Black/Diamond Dust Black; Green; White; Eternal Blue; Mystical Green; A3x: Midnight Black; Aurora Green; Moonlight White
- Dimensions: H: 168.4 mm W: 76.3 mm T: 8.3 mm
- Weight: A3/POCO C61: 199 g (glass); 193 g (eco-leather); A3x: 193 g
- Operating system: Android 14
- System-on-chip: A3/POCO C61: MediaTek Helio G36 (12 nm); A3x: UNISOC T603 (22 nm)
- CPU: A3/POCO C61: 8 cores (4×2.2 GHz Cortex-A53 & 4×1.6 GHz Cortex-A53); A3x: 8 cores (2×1.8 GHz Cortex-A53 & 6×1.6 GHz Cortex-A53)
- GPU: A3/POCO C61: PowerVR GE8320
- Memory: A3: 2/3/4/6 GB; POCO C61: 4/6 GB; A3x: 3/4 GB
- Storage: 64/128 GB eMMC 5.1
- Removable storage: MicroSDXC up to 1 TB
- SIM: Dual SIM (Nano-SIM)
- Battery: Non-removable, Li-Po 5000 mAh
- Charging: 10 W
- Rear camera: 8 MP, f/2.0 (Wide-angle) + QVGA (auxiliary lens); LED-flash, HDR; Video: 1080p@30fps
- Front camera: 5 MP, f/2.2 (Wide-angle); HDR; Video: 1080p@30fps
- Display: IPS LCD, 90 Hz, 6.71", 1650 × 720 (HD+), 20.6:9, 268 ppi
- Sound: Mono sound
- Data inputs: USB-C 2.0 (OTG), 3.5 mm audio Bluetooth: A3/POCO C61: 5.4 (A2DP, LE); A3x: 4.2 (A2DP); FM radio, NFC (A3 depending on region/market); Wi-Fi: A3/POCO C61: 802.11 a/b/g/n/ac (dual-band); A3x: 802.11 b/g/n; Satellite navigation: GPS (A-GPS), GLONASS, Galileo, BeiDou (A3/POCO C61)
- Codename: A3/POCO C61: blue A3x: klein
- Other: Virtual proximity sensor, Touch-sensitive Multi-touch, microphone, fingerprint scanner (in power button), accelerometer, compass
- Website: Official Redmi A3 website} Official POCO C61 website Official Redmi A3x website

The Redmi A3 and Redmi A3x are entry-level smartphones developed by Redmi, Xiaomi's subsidiary brand. They were introduced on February 14, 2024 and May 24, 2024, respectively. The main differences between the models are the processor and memory configurations.

On March 26, 2024, the POCO C61 was introduced, which differs from the Redmi A3 in colors and memory configurations.

== Design ==
The front panel is made of Corning Gorilla Glass 3, and the frame is made of plastic. The back panel in the Redmi A3 and POCO C61 is made of glass or eco-leather depending on the color (Forest/Olive Green and green, respectively), while the Redmi A3x's is made of plastic.

The smartphones feature a large round camera island with two camera lenses and an LED flash.

The microphone and USB-C connector are located at the bottom, the speaker and 3.5 mm audio jack are at the top, the tray with slots for 2 SIM cards and a microSD memory card up to 1 TB is on the left, and the volume rocker and power button with a built-in fingerprint scanner are on the right.

The smartphones are available in different color options, respectively:

Redmi A3		POCO C61		Redmi A3x	
Color	Color name	Color	Color name	Color	Color name
	Midnight Black		Black (Diamond Dust Black in India)		Midnight Black
	Forest Green (Olive Green in India)		Green		Aurora Green
	Star Blue (Lake Blue in India)		White		Moonlight White
			Ethereal Blue		
			Mystical Green		

== Technical specifications ==
=== Hardware ===
The Redmi A3 and POCO C61, like their predecessors, are equipped with the system-on-a-chip MediaTek Helio G36, while the Redmi A3x uses the UNISOC T603. The Redmi A3 is available in configurations of 2/64 GB, 3/64 GB, 4/64 GB, 3/128 GB, 4/128 GB, and 6/128 GB. The POCO C61 is available in 3/64 GB, 4/64 GB, 4/128 GB, and 6/128 GB configurations, and the Redmi A3x is available in 3/64 GB, 4/64 GB, and 4/128 GB.

The battery capacity for the models is 5000 mAh.

The smartphones feature a main dual-camera setup with an 8 MP wide-angle lens with an aperture of $f/2.0$ and an auxiliary QVGA lens used for the bokeh mode. The smartphones also have a 5 MP front wide-angle camera with an aperture of $f/2.2$. Both the main and front cameras can record video at 1080p@30fps.

The display is an IPS LCD, 6.71 inches, HD+ (1650 × 720) with a 20.6:9 aspect ratio, a pixel density of 268 ppi, a 90 Hz refresh rate, and a water-drop notch for the front camera.

=== Software ===
The smartphones were released with a slightly modified regular Android 14, unlike the Android Go installed on the previous models and the Redmi A5 and POCO C71. The system has modified icons, a notification panel similar to the one in MIUI, and certain proprietary Xiaomi applications.

Preceded by Redmi A2	Redmi A3; 2024	Succeeded by Redmi A4 5G
New title	Redmi A3x; 2024	Succeeded by ---
Preceded by POCO C51	POCO C61; 2024	Succeeded by POCO C71
