= HMD Aura2 =

2025 entry-level HMD smartphone

HMD Aura 2
- Brand: HMD
- Manufacturer: HMD Global
- Type: Smartphone
- Series: Aura
- First released: Australia: March 13, 2025
- Predecessor: HMD Aura
- Form factor: Slate
- Colors: Midnight Black; Icy Blue
- Dimensions: 166.4 mm (6.55 in) H 76.9 mm (3.03 in) W 9 mm (0.35 in) D
- Weight: 185.4 g (6.54 oz)
- Operating system: Android 14 (Go edition)
- System-on-chip: Unisoc SC9863A (28 nm)
- CPU: Octa-core (4x1.6 GHz Cortex-A55 & 4x1.2 GHz Cortex-A55)
- GPU: IMG8322
- Memory: 4 GB RAM
- Storage: 256 GB
- Removable storage: microSDXC
- Battery: 5000 mAh Li-Po
- Charging: 10W wired
- Rear camera: 13 MP, (wide), AF; LED flash, panorama, 1080p video
- Front camera: 5 MP
- Display: 6.52 in (166 mm) IPS LCD; 576 x 1280 pixels, 20:9 ratio (~215 ppi)
- Sound: Loudspeaker, 3.5mm jack
- Connectivity: Wi-Fi 802.11 b/g/n, Bluetooth 5.2, GPS, GLONASS, USB-C
- Data inputs: Capacitive touchscreen, Fingerprint scanner (side-mounted), accelerometer, proximity
- Water resistance: IP54 (EU only)

The HMD Aura2 (stylized as the Aura^{2} (Aura squared)) is an entry-level Android smartphone that was manufactured, branded, and designed by HMD Global on February 11, 2025, until its launch date on March 13, 2025, in Australia. It was the successor of the HMD Aura with the same camera module and also a reparable device.

== Development ==
In September 2024, HMD planned the development of the HMD Aura2 with 2 rear cameras consisting of a 13-megapixel main camera and a 0.8-megapixel camera and the same display from its predecessor. The front camera was also upgraded to 8-megapixels as well. Since the official announcement was taken on February 11, 2025, it was no longer mentioned the secondary 0.8-megapixel camera including the upgraded front camera and the 6.56-inch display, which would take the same as the predecessor with a slightly smaller display sizing at about 6.52 inches.

== Specifications ==
=== Hardware ===
The HMD Aura 2 features a 6.52-inch IPS LCD display with a resolution of 576 x 1280 pixels and a peak brightness of 460 nits. The device is powered by a Unisoc SC9863A chipset built on a 28 nm process, featuring an octa-core CPU (4x1.6 GHz Cortex-A55 and 4x1.2 GHz Cortex-A55) and an IMG8322 GPU. It comes with 4GB of RAM and 256GB of internal storage, which can be expanded via a microSDXC card slot.

The phone is designed with repairability in mind, allowing users to replace the display, back cover, battery, and charging port. It measures 166.4 x 76.9 x 9 mm, weighs 185.4 grams, and holds an IP54 rating for dust and splash resistance (EU model). Power is supplied by a 5,000 mAh non-removable battery supporting 10W wired charging. Physical connectivity includes a USB Type-C port, a 3.5mm headphone jack, and a side-mounted fingerprint sensor.

=== Cameras ===
The device is equipped with a basic camera system featured by a single 13 MP wide-angle lens with autofocus (AF) and an LED flash. Supported camera features include panorama mode and video recording. On the front, there is a 5 MP selfie camera housed within the display's notch, which is also capable of capturing video.

=== Software ===
The HMD Aura 2 runs on Android 14 (Go edition) as its mobile operating system.
