= Nokia 2.4 =

2020 Nokia smartphone

- Brand: Nokia
- Manufacturer: HMD Global
- Type: Smartphone
- First released: 22 September 2020; 5 years ago
- Predecessor: Nokia 2.3
- Successor: Nokia G10
- Related: Nokia 1.4; Nokia 3.4; Nokia 5.4
- Compatible networks: GSM, 3G, 4G (LTE)
- Form factor: Slate
- Colors: Fjord, Dusk, Charcoal
- Dimensions: 165.85×76.3×8.69 mm (6.530×3.004×0.342 in)
- Weight: 195 g (7 oz)
- Operating system: Initial: Android 10; Current: Android 12
- CPU: MediaTek MT6762 Helio P22 (12 nm), octa-core 2.0 GHz Cortex-A53
- GPU: PowerVR GE8320
- Memory: 2/3 GB LPDDR4X
- Storage: 32/64 GB eMMC 5.1
- Removable storage: microSD up to 512 GB
- Battery: Non-removable Li-Ion 4500 mAh
- Charging: 10W wired, microUSB 2.0
- Rear camera: 13 MP, f/2.0 (wide) + 2 MP, f/2.4 (depth sensor), 1/5.0", 1.75 µm LED flash, HDR, panorama Video: 1080p@30fps
- Front camera: 5 MP, f/2.4 Video: 1080p@30fps
- Display: IPS LCD, 6.5 in, 1600 × 720 (HD+), 20:9, 270 ppi
- Connectivity: Micro-USB 2.0, 3.5 mm jack, Bluetooth 5.0 (A2DP, LE), FM radio, Wi-Fi 802.11 b/g/n, GPS with A-GPS, GLONASS, BDS
- SAR: Head: 0.27 W/kg; Body: 1.54 W/kg
- Other: Rear-mounted fingerprint scanner, proximity sensor, accelerometer

Nokia 2.4 is an entry-level budget smartphone branded by Nokia and manufactured by HMD Global. It was announced on September 22, 2020 along with the Nokia 3.4.

The Nokia 2.4 features the Google Assistant button below the SIM card on the left.

== Technical specifications ==
=== Design & Hardware ===
The frame and the back is made of polycarbonate. It was available in Fjord, Dusk, and Charcoal colors.

The Nokia 2.4 is powered by a MediaTek Helio P22 processor and a PowerVR GE8320 graphics processor. The battery, which is lithium polymer, has a capacity of 4500 mAh, which lasts for 2 days. It features an IPS LCD display sizing at 6.5 inches, with a resolution of 720 x 1600 px (20:9) and 270 ppi density. The internal storage configuration is either sold at 32GB 2GB RAM or 64GB 3GB RAM.

=== Camera ===
The Nokia 2.4 features a dual camera (2 auxiliary lenses) with 13MP (f/2.0) main and 2MP (f/2.4) depth with autofocus and the front camera with 5MP (f/2.4). Both cameras can record up to 1080p @ 30fps.

=== Software ===
The Nokia 2.4 is part of the Android One program, which runs on Android 10. It was updated to Android 11, and on May 16, 2022, it was updated to Android 12 with September security patch followed by OctobersSecurity update.

== Controversy ==
- A critic from GadgetMatch noticed that games like Asphalt 9: Legends is compatible with low graphics, but in high graphics it would crash.
