= HMD Key =

2025 Android Smartphone

- Brand: HMD Global
- Manufacturer: HMD Global
- Type: Smartphone
- First released: January 2, 2025; 17 months ago
- Predecessor: Nokia C12
- Compatible networks: 2G GSM, 3G HSPA, 4G LTE
- Colors: Midnight Black, Icy Blue
- Dimensions: 166.4×76.9×9 mm (6.55×3.03×0.35 in)
- Weight: 6.53 oz (185 g)
- Operating system: Android 14 (Go edition)
- System-on-chip: Unisoc SC9832E
- CPU: 1.3 GHz Cortex-A53, quad-core
- GPU: Mali-820MP1
- Memory: 2GB RAM
- Storage: 32GB
- Removable storage: microSDXC expandable up to 128GB
- SIM: Nano-SIM
- Battery: 4000 mAh
- Charging: 10W; wired
- Rear camera: 8MP, wide-angle lens, AF; Features LED flash and panorama
- Front camera: 5MP
- Display: 6.52" IPS LCD, 460 nits (peak); 576 x 1280 pixels (20:9 ratio, 215 ppi)
- Water resistance: IP52
- Website: https://www.hmd.com/en_int/hmd-key?sku=1GS009MPG3001

The HMD Key is a budget Android smartphone developed by HMD Global and announced on January 2, 2025. It is marketed in the UK, Australia, and New Zealand.

== Specifications ==
=== Hardware ===
The HMD Key is powered by four 1.3 GHz Cortex-A53 CPUs and a Mali-820MP1 GPU, with a Unisoc SC9832E system on a chip. It has a battery capacity of 4000 mAh, which lasts long up to 47 hours in a single charge, claimed by HMD. In the front, the display is an in-plane switching LCD, sizing at 6.52 inches, with a resolution of 576 x 1280 px (20:9) and 60Hz redfresh rate, featuring an IP52 water resisstance. The main camera features a single 8MP lens and a 5MP front camera. It only has 32GB of internal storage and 2GB of RAM, with expandable storage up to 128GB with the microSD.

=== Software ===
The HMD Key only runs on the Go edition of Android 14 with security updates for 2 years quarterly.
