= Samsung S5610 =

Mobile phone

Samsung Primo/Utopia S5610/11
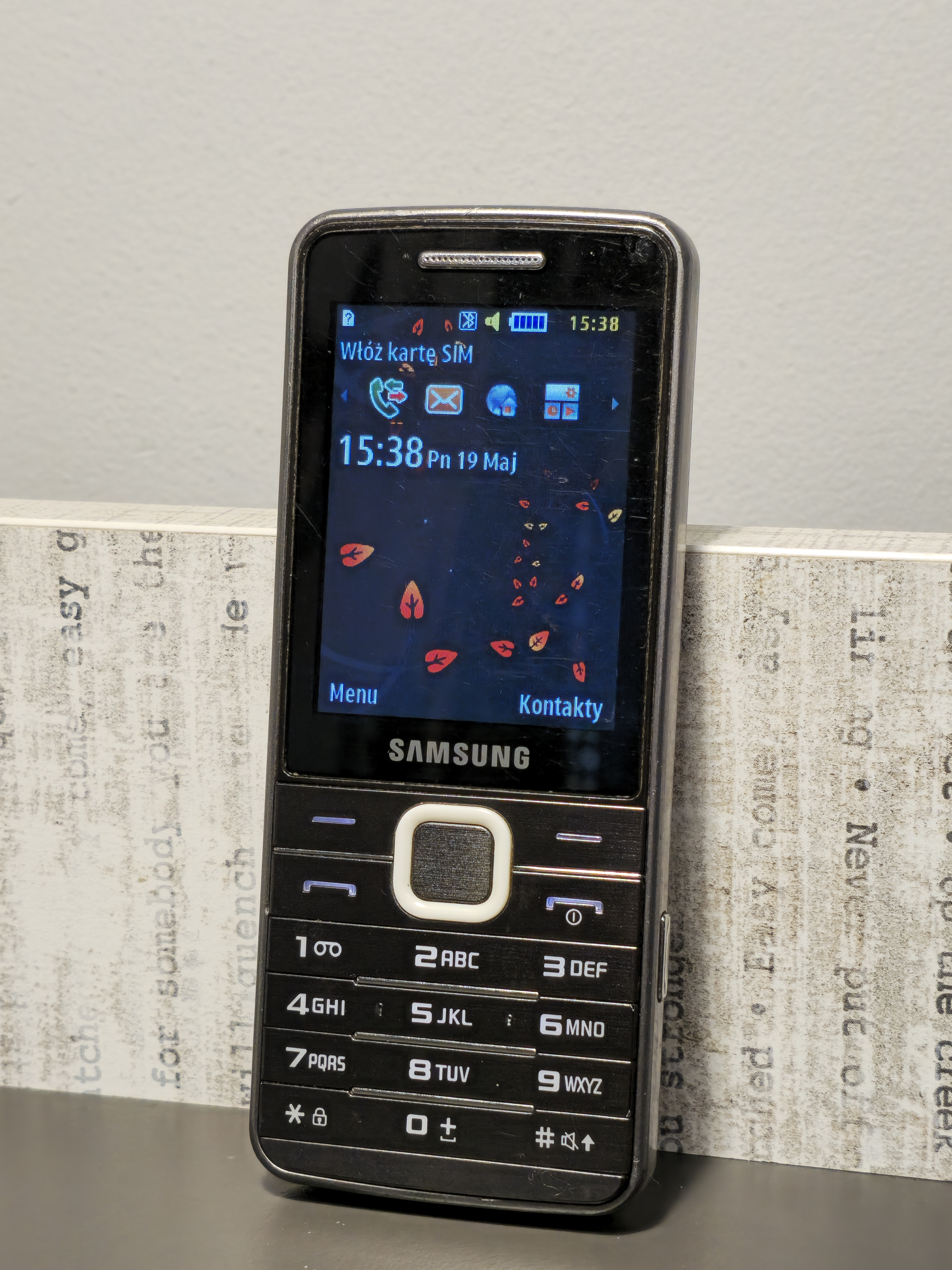
- Manufacturer: Samsung Mobile
- Series: S-Series
- Availability by region: August 2011
- Related: Samsung GT-C3322 Metro Duos
- Compatible networks: GSM 850/900/1800/1900/2100, GPRS, EDGE; UMTS 900/2100 Services MMS, SMS, WAP, SMS, WAP, WAP 2.0 Video calling video 3G
- Form factor: Candybar
- Dimensions: 118.9×49.7×12.9 mm (4.68×1.96×0.51 in)
- Weight: 91 g (3 oz)
- Operating system: Samsung proprietary
- CPU: Broadcom, 468 MHz (S5610); 460 MHz (S5611)
- Memory: 128MB RAM (S5610); 512MB RAM (S5611)
- Storage: 108 MB Internal Memory (S5610); 256 MB Internal Memory (S5611)
- Removable storage: microSD up to 16GB (microSDHC compatible)
- Battery: Li-ion 1000mAh
- Charging: 5V 1A
- Rear camera: 5.0 MP, 2560x1920 pixels, auto focus, macro mode, In JPEG format, 13 different shooting modes, 3-stop lens, LED flash, 240p 30fps video (S5610)
- Front camera: Yes (S5610; only used for video calls)
- Display: 2.4-inch (61 mm) QVGA 240 x 320 pixels TFT LCD, 256K colors
- Media: MP3/WMA/AAC/WAV/H.263/MP4
- Connectivity: Bluetooth 3.0 with A2DP and microUSB 2.0

The Samsung S5610/11 (also known as Samsung Primo/Utopia) was announced in 24 July 2011 as part of a range of feature phones released by Samsung. It supports smile detection, records video in QVGA at 30fps. It also has FM recording and SNS integration. A slightly updated version was announced in 28 January 2014 as GT-S5611 model. Both run on single-core CPUs ranging from 460 to 469 MHz. The differences are that the S5610 uses NXP's processor and has 108 MB internal memory, while the S5611 uses Spreadtrum's processor and has 256 MB internal memory. However, the S5611 lacks WAP 2.0 functionality and the usage of the camera LED as a torch.

There is also an Indian CDMA+GSM version marketed as Primo Duos, with the internal model number SCH-W279.

It has also gained additional popularity due to unlicensed and uncredited usage by James Bond in the film Spectre.

== Specifications ==
- 2.4-inch TFT LCD
- 5-megapixel camera with LED flash and autofocus
- Stereo FM radio with RDS and 3.5mm audio jack, possessing FM recording functionality
- 680 h 3G standby (S5610) vs 310 h 3G standby (S5611)
- resolution of 240 x 320 pixels.
- 108 MB Internal memory (S5610) vs 256 MB Internal memory (S5611)

== Software (firmware) differences ==
- S5610:
  - Editing contacts: 50 characters for first and last name
  - No call recorder
  - SMS capacity up to 300 messages
  - Calendar capacity up to 1000 entries
  - Video call (Useful for S5610K variant which have CIF front camera)
  - Can change font size in software
  - Transition animations between the menus
  - No dark theme
- S5611:
  - Editing contacts: 20 characters for first and last name
  - Call recorder
  - SMS capacity up to 1000 messages
  - Calendar capacity up to 500 entries
  - No video call (CIF front camera)
  - Cannot change font size in software
  - No transition animations between the menus
  - Dark theme
