= Philips E105 =

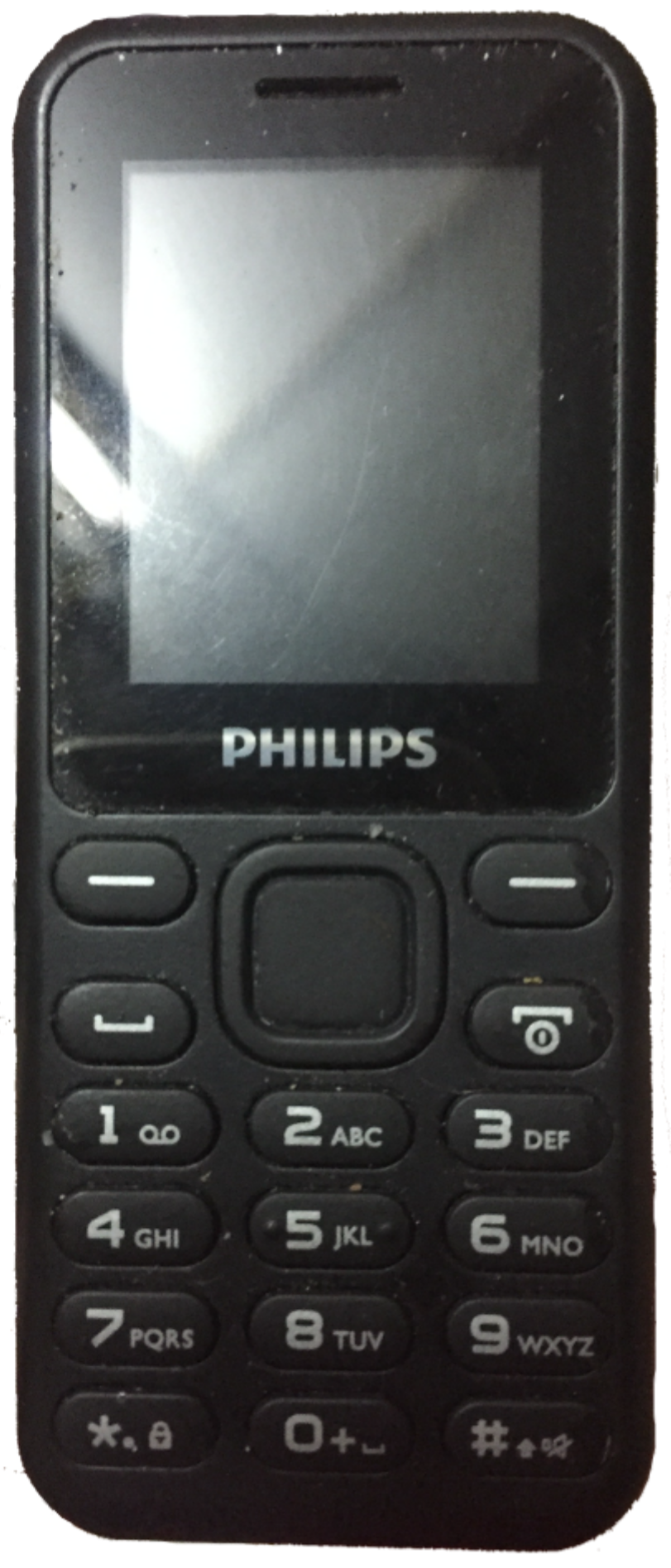
- Availability by region: December 2015
- Dimensions: 106×44.5×13.6 mm (4.17×1.75×0.54 in)
- Weight: 64.1 g (2 oz)
- Display: 1.7-inch (43 mm) VGA 128 x 160 pixel TFT LCD, 656K colors
- Connectivity: 2G and microUSB 1.0

The Philips E105 was announced in December 2015 as part of a range of feature phones released by Philips. It supports smile detection, records video in QVGA at 30 fps. It also has FM recording and SNS integration. A slightly updated version was released in December 2015 as E105 model. Both run on single-core CPUs ranging from 460 to 469 MHz. The differences are that the E105 uses NXP's processor and has 108 MB internal memory, while the E105 uses Spreadtrum's processor and has 256 MB internal memory, while the E105 uses Spreadtrum's processor and has 256 MB internal memory. However, the E105 lacks WAP 2.0 functionality and LED flash.

== Specifications ==
- 1.7-inch TFT-LCD
- VGA camera
- MicroSD up to 32 GB
- 2G, Dual SIM
