= Redmi A2 =

Android smartphone developed by Xiaomi

Redmi A2 Redmi A2+/Poco C51
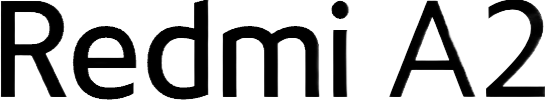
- Brand: Redmi, Poco
- Manufacturer: Xiaomi
- Type: Phablet
- Series: Redmi A/Poco C
- First released: March 24, 2023
- Predecessor: Redmi A1
- Successor: Redmi A3
- Compatible networks: 2G, 3G, 4G LTE
- Form factor: Slate
- Weight: 192 g (7 oz)
- Operating system: Android 13 Go Edition
- System-on-chip: MediaTek Helio G36
- CPU: Octa-core (4x2.2 GHz Cortex-A53 & 4x1.7 GHz Cortex-A53)
- GPU: PowerVR GE8320
- Memory: 2/3/4 GB
- Storage: 32 GB / 64 GB
- Removable storage: microSD
- Battery: 5000 mAh
- Rear camera: 8 MP, f/2.0, (wide); 0.08 MP (auxiliary lens)
- Front camera: 5 MP f/2.2
- Display: 6.52", 20:9, 720x1600, IPS LCD, 269 ppi
- Sound: Mono loudspeaker
- Connectivity: Wi-Fi
- Data inputs: MicroUSB 2.0, 3.5mm audio jack
- Model: A2: 22026RN54G; A2+: 22026RN4DG, 22026RN4DH, 22026RN4DI; Poco C51: 2302EPCC4I, MZB0DXKIN, MZB0E6DIN
- Codename: water
- Website: www.po.co/global/poco-c51/

The Redmi A2 and Redmi A2+ are entry-level smartphones released by Xiaomi's sub-brand Redmi on March 24, 2023. The main differences comparing to predecessor are newer and more powerful SoC and a newer Android version.

Also, on April 7, 2023 Poco released the Poco C51 which is the same Redmi A2+ with different color and memory options.

The Redmi A2/A2+ and Poco C51 were some of the last smartphones to use MicroUSB.
