= Nokia C30 =

2021 Android phablet

- Brand: Nokia
- Manufacturer: HMD Global
- Type: Phablet
- Series: C
- First released: July 27, 2021; 4 years ago
- Predecessor: Nokia C3
- Successor: Nokia C31
- Related: Nokia C01 Plus; Nokia C10; Nokia C20
- Compatible networks: GSM, 3G, 4G (LTE)
- Form factor: Slate
- Colors: Green, White, Dark Grey
- Dimensions: 177.7×79.1×9.9 mm (7.00×3.11×0.39 in)
- Weight: 237 g (8 oz)
- Operating system: Android 11 (Go Edition)
- CPU: UNISOC SC9863A (28 nm), 8 cores (4×1.6 GHz Cortex-A55 & 4×1.2 GHz Cortex-A55)
- GPU: IMG8322
- Memory: 2/3/4 GB, LPDDR4X
- Storage: 32/64 GB, eMMC 5.1
- Removable storage: MicroSDXC up to 256 GB
- Battery: Removable, Li-Ion 6000 mAh
- Charging: 10 W
- Rear camera: 13 MP (wide-angle) + 2 MP, f/2.4 (depth sensor); LED flash Video: 1080p@30fps
- Front camera: 5 MP, f/2.2 Video: 720p@30fps
- Display: IPS LCD, 6.82", 1600 × 720 (HD+), 20:9, 257 ppi
- Data inputs: microUSB 2.0, 3.5 mm Audio, Bluetooth 4.2 (A2DP), FM radio, Wi-Fi 802.11 a/b/g/n (hotspot), GPS, A-GPS
- Other: Fingerprint scanner (rear-mounted), accelerometer, proximity sensor

Nokia C30 is an entry-level Android phablet developed by HMD Global under the Nokia brand. It was unveiled on July 27, 2021. In Ukraine, the smartphone went on sale on October 12, 2021, alongside the Nokia 6310 (2021).

== Design ==
The screen is made of glass. The body is made of plastic with a wavy texture.

The design of the Nokia C30 is similar to the Nokia C20 Plus.

At the bottom, there is a microUSB connector and a microphone. At the top, there is a 3.5 mm audio jack. On the right side, there are volume buttons and the power/lock button. Slots for two SIM cards and a microSD card up to 256 GB are located under the removable back panel. On the back, there is a speaker with a small protrusion to prevent it from being muffled when the phone is lying flat, the "NOKIA" logo, a fingerprint scanner, a circular dual-camera module, and an LED flash to its left.

The Nokia C30 is sold in 3 colors: Green, White, and Dark Gray.

Only the green color is officially available in Ukraine.

== Technical specifications ==
=== Processor ===
The smartphone features a Unisoc SC9863A processor and an IMG8322 GPU.

=== Battery ===
The battery has a capacity of 6000 mAh, which was the largest battery capacity in Nokia phones at the time of its release.

=== Camera ===
The circular camara module has a 13 MP (wide-angle) + 2 MP, f/2.4 (depth sensor) dual main camera with 1080p@30fps video recording capability. The front camera has a 5 MP resolution, f/2.2 aperture, and 720p@30fps video recording capability.

=== Display ===
The display is an IPS LCD, 6.82", HD+ (1600 × 720) with a 20:9 aspect ratio, 257 ppi pixel density, and a waterdrop notch for the front camera.

=== Storage & RAM ===
The Nokia C30 is available in 2/32, 3/32, 3/64, and 4/64 GB configurations.

Only the 2/32 GB version is officially available in Ukraine.

=== Hardware ===
The smartphone runs on Android 11 (Go Edition).
