= Nokia C10 =

2021 Android phablet

- Brand: Nokia
- Manufacturer: HMD Global
- Type: Phablet
- Series: Nokia C
- First released: April 8, 2021; 5 years ago
- Predecessor: Nokia 1.4; Nokia C1
- Successor: Nokia C12; Nokia C100
- Related: Nokia C01 Plus; Nokia C20; Nokia C30
- Compatible networks: GSM 850 / 900 / 1800 / 1900, 3G 850 / 900 / 1700(AWS) / 1900 / 2100
- Form factor: Slate
- Colors: Gray and Light Purple
- Dimensions: 169.9 × 77.9 × 8.8 mm
- Weight: 191 g
- Operating system: Android 11 (Go Edition)
- System-on-chip: UNISOC SC7331E (28 nm)
- CPU: 4×1.3 GHz Cortex-A7
- GPU: Mali-400 MP2
- Memory: 1/2 GB LPDDR4X
- Storage: 16/32 GB eMMC 5.1
- Removable storage: microSDXC up to 256 GB
- Battery: Removable, Li-Ion 3000 mAh
- Charging: 5 W
- Rear camera: 5 MP, f/2.2 LED flash, HDR, panorama Video: 720p@30fps
- Front camera: 5 MP, f/2.2 LED flash Video: 720p@30fps
- Display: IPS LCD, 6.52", 1600 × 720 (HD+), 20:9, 269 ppi
- Sound: Mono speaker
- Connectivity: microUSB 2.0, 3.5 mm Audio, Bluetooth 4.2 (A2DP), FM radio, Wi-Fi 802.11 a/b/g/n, GPS, A-GPS
- Data inputs: Accelerometer, proximity sensor

The Nokia C10 (modeled as LA-1342) is an entry-level Android smartphone developed by HMD Global under the brand Nokia. It was first unveiled on April 8, 2021.

== Specifications ==
=== Design ===
The display is made of Panda Glass, and the body is made of plastic with a wavy texture. The Nokia C10 is visually identical to the Nokia C20.

At the bottom there is a microUSB connector and a microphone, and at the top there is a 3.5 mm audio jack. On the right side are the volume buttons and the lock button. Slots for, depending on the version, 1 SIM card and a memory card or for 2 SIM cards and a memory card are located under the removable panel. On the back there is a speaker with a protruding dot to prevent the speaker from being covered when lying down, the "NOKIA" logo, and a circular camera module with an LED flash. There is also an LED flash on the front for the front camera.

The device was sold in two colors: Gray and Light Purple colors.

=== Hardware ===
The Nokia C10, like its predecessor, received a UNISOC SC7331E central processor with a Mali-400 MP2 GPU. The device was sold in 1/16, 2/16, 1/32, and 2/32 GB configurations.

The internal storage can be expanded with a microSD memory card up to 256 GB. The removable battery has a capacity of 3000 mAh.

The Nokia C10 features a 6.52-inch IPS LCD display with HD+ (1600 × 720) resolution, a 20:9 aspect ratio, 269 ppi pixel density, and a waterdrop notch for the front camera.

==== Cameras ====
The smartphone's circular camera module has a 5 MP main and front camera with an aperture of f/2.2 and 720p@30fps video recording capability.

=== Software ===
The Nokia C10 was released with Android 11 (Go Edition).

== See also ==
- Pixel 6
- Nokia C30
- Motorola Edge S
