= Nokia 1.4 =

Nokia entry-level smartphone

- Brand: Nokia
- Developer: HMD Global
- Manufacturer: Tinno Mobile
- Type: Phablet
- First released: February 3, 2021; 5 years ago
- Predecessor: Nokia 1.3
- Successor: Nokia C10; Nokia C20
- Related: Nokia 2.4; Nokia 3.4; Nokia 5.4
- Compatible networks: GSM, 3G, 4G (LTE)
- Form factor: Slate
- Colors: Fjord (Blue), Charcoal, Dusk (Purple)
- Dimensions: 166.42×76.72×8.7 mm (6.552×3.020×0.343 in)
- Weight: 178 g (6 oz)
- Operating system: Original: Android 10 (Go edition); Current: Android 11 (Go edition)
- System-on-chip: Qualcomm Snapdragon 215 (28 nm)
- CPU: Quad-core 1.3 GHz Cortex-A53
- GPU: Adreno 308
- Memory: 1/2/3 GB RAM
- Storage: 16/32/64 GB eMMC 5.1
- Removable storage: microSDXC up to 128 GB
- SIM: Nano-SIM or Dual SIM (Nano-SIM)
- Battery: Non-removable Li-Po 4000 mAh
- Charging: 5 W
- Rear camera: 8 MP (wide), AF + 2 MP (macro); LED flash, HDR; Video: 720p@30fps
- Front camera: 5 MP; Video: 720p@30fps
- Display: 6.52 in IPS LCD, 1600 × 720 (HD+), 20:9 ratio, 269 ppi
- Sound: Mono, with 3.5 mm jack
- Connectivity: microUSB 2.0, Bluetooth 4.2 (A2DP, LE), FM radio, Wi-Fi 802.11 b/g/n, GPS (A-GPS), GLONASS, Galileo, BeiDou
- Data inputs: Touchscreen multi-touch, microphone, fingerprint scanner (rear-mounted), accelerometer, Proximity sensor
- Model: TA-1322
- Made in: China

Nokia 1.4 is an entry-level smartphone developed by HMD Global under the Nokia brand. It was announced on February 3, 2021.

It was also available in the Philippines on March 9, 2021.

== Specifications ==
=== Design ===
The front panel is made of glass, while the body is constructed from plastic.

The bottom features a microUSB port and a microphone, the top houses a 3.5 mm audio jack, and the left side contains a dedicated Google Assistant button and, depending on the model, a slot for one SIM card and a memory card or two SIM cards and a memory card. The right side features the volume rocker and the power button. On the back, there is a circular dual-camera island with an LED flash, a fingerprint scanner, a speaker with a small protrusion for sound clearance, and the logo.

The Nokia 1.4 was sold in three colors: Fjord (blue), Charcoal (black), and Dusk (purple).

=== Hardware ===
The Nokia 1.4 is powered by a Qualcomm Snapdragon 215 processor with an Adreno 308 GPU. The smartphone was available in 1/16 GB, 2/32 GB, and 3/64 GB configurations. Storage can be expanded via a microSD card up to 128 GB.

The battery capacity is 4000 mAh.

The device features a 6.52-inch IPS LCD screen with HD+ resolution (1600 × 720), a pixel density of 269 ppi, a 20:9 aspect ratio, and a waterdrop notch for the front camera.

The Nokia 1.4 features a dual rear camera system consisting of an 8 MP wide-angle lens with autofocus and a 2 MP macro lens, along with a 5 MP front-facing camera. Both the rear and front cameras are capable of recording video at 720p@30fps.

=== Software ===
The Nokia 1.4 was released with Android 10 (Go edition) and was later updated to Android 12 (Go edition).
