= Nokia C2 (2020) =

Smartphone

- Brand: Nokia
- Developer: HMD Global
- Manufacturer: Foxconn
- Type: Smartphone
- Successor: Nokia C20
- Related: Nokia C1
- Dimensions: H: 154.8 mm (6.09 in); W: 75.6 mm (2.98 in); D: 8.9 mm (0.35 in)
- Weight: 161 g (5.7 oz)
- Operating system: Android 9 "Pie" (Android Go)
- System-on-chip: Unisoc (28 nm)
- CPU: Quad-core 1.4 GHz
- Memory: 1 GB RAM
- Storage: 16 GB
- Removable storage: microSD, up to 64 GB
- Battery: 2800 mAh Li-ion, removable
- Rear camera: 5 MP (f/2.2, autofocus); LED flash, HDR; Video: 720p@30fps
- Front camera: 5 MP; LED flash Video: 720p@30fps
- Display: 5.7 in (14 cm) (83.8 cm^{2}) 720p IPS LCD, ~282 ppi pixel density
- Connectivity: 3.5 mm TRRS headphone jack; Bluetooth 4.2; micro USB 2.0 port
- Data inputs: Sensors: Accelerometer; Proximity sensor
- Website: www.hmd.com/en_int/nokia-c-2

The Nokia C2 is a Nokia-branded entry-level smartphone by HMD Global, running the Android Go variant of Android. It was announced on March 16, 2020.

== Specifications ==
The Nokia C2 has Android 9 Pie (Go Edition) operating system with a Unisoc System-on-Chip and 1 GB of RAM. It has 16 GB of internal storage, which can be expanded with a MicroSD card, up to 64 GB. The phone has a 5.7-inch HD+ IPS LCD.

The phone weighs 161 g and is 8.9 mm thick. It has thick bezels with a chin at the bottom. The phone is sold in 2 colors — Cyan and Black.

== C2 2nd Edition ==
Nokia C2 2nd Edition comes with Android 11 (Go Edition).
