= HMD Aura =

2024 Android smartphone

- Developer: HMD Global
- First released: May 23, 2024; 2 years ago
- Availability by region: May 24, 2024; Australia
- Predecessor: Nokia C22
- Successor: HMD Aura 2
- Compatible networks: GSM, HSDPA, 4G (LTE)
- Colors: Glacier Green, Indigo Black
- Weight: 175 g (6 oz)
- Operating system: Android 13
- System-on-chip: UNISOC SC9863A1 (22 nm)
- CPU: Octa-core (4×1.6 GHz Cortex-A55 & 4×1.2 GHz Cortex-A55)
- GPU: IMG8322
- Memory: 4 GB
- Storage: 64/128 GB
- Removable storage: microSDXC up to 256 GB
- SIM: Dual SIM (Nano-SIM)
- Battery: 5000 mAh
- Charging: 10 W
- Rear camera: 13 MP (wide), auxiliary lens
- Front camera: 5 MP
- Display: 6.56" IPS LCD, HD+ (720 × 1612 px), 60 Hz, 480 nits (typ)
- Sound: Mono
- Connectivity: USB-C 2.0 (OTG), Bluetooth 4.2, Wi-Fi 802.11 b/g/n, GPS
- Data inputs: Microphone, rear-mounted fingerprint scanner, accelerometer, proximity sensor

HMD Aura is an entry-level Android smartphone developed by the Finnish company HMD Global. The HMD Aura was released in on May 23, 2024, in Australia.

== Specifications ==
=== Design ===
The front panel is made of glass, while the back panel and frame are made of plastic. On the bottom, there is a 3.5 mm audio jack, a microphone, a USB-C port, and a speaker.

On the left side is the tray for two SIM cards and a memory card, and on the right are the volume rocker and power button. The rear features two camera lenses, an LED flash, a fingerprint scanner, and the HMD logo.

The HMD Aura is available in two colors: Glacier Green and Indigo Black.

=== Hardware ===
The HMD Aura is powered by the entry-level UNISOC SC9863A1 system on a chip. The device features 64 or 128 GB of flash memory and 4 GB of RAM. Storage capacity can be expanded using a microSD card up to 256 GB.

The battery has a capacity of 5000 mAh.

The smartphone features a 6.56-inch IPS LCD display with HD+ resolution (1612 × 720), a pixel density of 268 ppi, a 20:9 aspect ratio, a 60 Hz refresh rate, and a waterdrop notch for the front camera.

The HMD Aura has a dual main camera setup featuring a 13 megapixel wide-angle lens with autofocus, capable of recording video at 1080p@30fps, and an auxiliary lens for bokeh effects. The smartphone also has a 5 MP front-facing camera.

=== Software ===
The HMD Aura runs on Android 13.
