= Nokia G10 =

Nokia-branded mid-end Android smartphone

- Brand: Nokia
- Developer: Nokia
- Manufacturer: HMD Global
- Type: Smartphone
- Family: G series, Android One
- First released: April 26, 2021
- Discontinued: July 24, 2024
- Successor: Nokia G11
- Related: Nokia G20; Nokia G50
- Form factor: Slate
- Colors: Night, Dusk
- Dimensions: 164.9 mm × 76 mm × 0.2 mm (6.4921 in × 2.9921 in × 0.0079 in)
- Weight: 194 g (6.8 oz)
- Operating system: Original: Android Android 11; Current: Android 13
- System-on-chip: Mediatek Helio G25
- CPU: Octa-core (4x2.0 GHz Cortex-A53 & 4x1.5 GHz Cortex-A53)
- GPU: PowerVR GE8320
- Memory: 3GB RAM & 4GB RAM
- Storage: 32GB & 64GB
- Removable storage: microSD, up to 512 GB (shared)
- Battery: Non-removable Li-Po 5050 mAh
- Charging: USB-C charging (10 W)
- Rear camera: 13 MP (wide) + 2 MP (macro) + 2 MP (depth), flash
- Front camera: 8 MP
- Display: IPS LCD 6.52 in (16.6 cm) 1600 x 720
- Connectivity: 3.5 mm TRRS headphone jack; USB-C port; 2G; 3G; 4G LTE
- Data inputs: Capacitive touchscreen; Fingerprint scanner; Accelerometer; Gyroscope; Proximity sensor; Electronic compass; Barometer; Ambient light sensor; GPS; Galileo; GLONASS; BeiDou; QZSS; NavIC
- Model: TA-1334, TA-1351, TA-1346, TA-1338
- Website: www.hmd.com/en_us/nokia-g-10?sku=719901153391

The Nokia G10 is a Nokia-branded Android One smartphone that was manufactured by HMD Global. It was announced on April 8, 2021, together with the Nokia C10, C20 and G10, and finally released on April 26, 2021.

The Nokia G10 is powered by the Mediatek MT6762G Helio G25 chipset, the octa-core layered with four 2.0 GHz Cortex-A53 and 1.5 GHz Cortex-A53 CPU, and the PowerVR GE8320 GPU. The battery capacity is 5050 mAh with USB Type-C 2.0 10W charging. The G10 features a 13MP wide-angle with autofocus with 2MP macro and in-depth sensor main camera and an 8MP wide-angle front camera. Both cameras can record up to 1080p at 30fps. Despite for the camera app, switching between main and front cameras can be slow.

Similar to Nokia predecessors like the Nokia 2.4, it features an IPS LCD sizing at 6.5" and a resolution of 720 x 1600 (20:9).
