= Redmi Go =

Android smartphone developed by Xiaomi

- Brand: Redmi
- Manufacturer: Xiaomi
- Type: Smartphone
- First released: February 2019
- Successor: Redmi A1
- Form factor: Slate
- Weight: 137 g (5 oz)
- Operating system: Android 8.1 "Oreo"; Android Go
- System-on-chip: Qualcomm Snapdragon 425
- CPU: Cortex-A53, quad-core 1.4 GHz
- GPU: Adreno 308
- Memory: 1 GB
- Storage: 8 GB / 16 GB
- Removable storage: microSD, up to 128 GB
- Battery: 3000 mAh
- Rear camera: 8 MP f/2.0
- Front camera: 5 MP f/2.2
- Display: 5", 16:9, 720x1280, IPS LCD, 294 ppi
- Sound: Mono loudspeaker
- Data inputs: MicroUSB 2.0, 3.5mm audio jack
- Website: Redmi Go

The Redmi Go is an Android Go smartphone developed by Xiaomi under their Redmi subbrand. It was announced in February 2019 for Europe, India and the Philippines.

== Availability ==
The Redmi Go retails for 80 euros in European markets. It is available in the Philippines through Lazada for PHP3990 and in India for INR4499. The device will not be sold in Western markets.

== Specifications ==
=== Hardware ===
The Redmi Go has several similarities with the 4A and 5A. All three phones have the same display and processor, however, the Redmi Go has less RAM, less storage and a lower-resolution camera. The dimensions and battery size are also identical to that of the 5A. A polycarbonate unibody construction is used, and black and blue color options are available. It lacks USB-C and instead relies on an older MicroUSB port. Neither a fingerprint sensor nor facial recognition are present.

=== Software ===
The Redmi Go runs on Android 8.1 "Oreo" Go Edition and does not use MIUI unlike other Redmi phones.

== Reception ==
Gadgets360 gave the Go a 7/10, praising the device's affordability, design and battery life, while criticizing the cameras as well as the limited RAM and storage.
