= Nokia C1 =

Android smartphone

- Brand: Nokia
- Developer: HMD Global
- Manufacturer: Foxconn
- Type: Smartphone
- Successor: Nokia C10
- Related: Nokia C1 Plus; Nokia 2 Nokia C2
- Dimensions: 147.6 × 71.4 × 8.7 mm (5.81 × 2.81 × 0.34 in)
- Weight: 155 g (5.5 oz)
- Operating system: Android 9 Pie (Go Edition)
- CPU: Quad-core 1.3 GHz
- Memory: 1 GB RAM
- Storage: 16 GB
- Removable storage: microSD, up to 64 GB
- Battery: 2500 mAh Li-ion, removable
- Rear camera: 5 MP (f/2.4, autofocus); LED flash Video: 720p@30fps
- Front camera: 5 MP; LED flash Video: 720p@30fps
- Display: 5.45 in (13.8 cm) (76.7 cm^{2}) 480p IPS LCD with toughened glass, ~197 ppi pixel density
- Connectivity: 3.5 mm TRRS headphone jack; Bluetooth 4.2; micro USB 2.0 port
- Data inputs: Accelerometer; Proximity sensor
- Website: www.hmd.com/en_int/nokia-c-1

The Nokia C1 is a Nokia-branded budget smartphone released by HMD Global, running the Android Go variant of Android. The phone supports 3G network speed and was announced on December 11, 2019.

== Specifications ==
=== Two cameras and two flashes ===
The smartphone has two, front and rear, 5 megapixel (MP) cameras. Nokia C1 has also two, front and rear, flashes.

=== Display ===
The smartphone has 5.45" (5.45 inches) FWVGA+ IPS LCD.

=== Battery, radio and storage ===
The smartphone has 2,500 mAh removable battery, 3.5 mm audio jack, FM radio, 16 Gigabit (GB) of storage, and a microSD card slot.

=== Operating system ===
Nokia C1 has Android 9 Pie (Go Edition) operating system with 1 GB of RAM and Quad Core 1.3 Gigahertz (GHz) processor as CPU.

== Advertisement ==
The slogan for the Nokia C1 was "Level Up", as HMD Global explaining, the smartphone was built for great flash-lit selfies with the front camera, getting video calls, and watching YouTube with a bigger, 5.4" display. As HMD Global spokesman Juho Sarvikas said, "Millions of consumers across markets in Africa, Middle East and APAC will upgrade from a feature phone to their first smartphone. Nokia C1 is a smartphone they can trust — bringing quality experiences at an affordable price with 3G connectivity."

=== Successor ===
HMD Global has launched the successor to the Nokia C1 smartphone with the name Nokia C1 Plus in 2020, which comes with Android 11 (Go Edition) and has other upgraded specifications, including a 5.45-inch HD+ 18:9 in-cell display (1520 x 720 pixels), a 1.4 GHz quad-core processor, 2 GB of LPDDR3 RAM, 16 GB storage, microSD card expandable storage, up to 128 GB, single / Dual SIM variants, a 5-megapixel rear camera with LED flash, a 5-megapixel front camera with LED flash, a 3,000 mAh removable battery and supports 4G VoLTE, Wi-Fi 802.11 b/g/n, Bluetooth 4.2, GPS, micro USB and 3.5 mm headphone jack connectivity options. It measures 149.1 × 71.2 × 8.75 mm and weighs 146 grams.
