= Nokia G60 =

2022 Nokia smartphone

- Brand: Nokia
- Manufacturer: HMD Global
- Type: Smartphone
- Series: Nokia G
- First released: September 01, 2022
- Successor: Nokia G22
- Compatible networks: GSM / HSPA / LTE / 5G
- Form factor: Slate
- Colors: Pure Black, Ice Gray
- Dimensions: 166×75.9×8.6 mm (6.54×2.99×0.34 in)
- Weight: 6.7 oz (190 g)
- Operating system: Android 12
- System-on-chip: Qualcomm SM6375 Snapdragon 695 5G (6 nm)
- CPU: Octa-core; 2x 2.2 GHz Kryo 660 Gold & 6x 1.7 GHz Kryo 660 Silver
- GPU: Adreno 619
- Memory: 4 GB or 6 GB of RAM
- Storage: 64 GB or 128 GB
- SIM: microSDXC
- Battery: Li-Po 4500 mAh
- Charging: USB-C 2.0 charging up to 20 W with PD 3.0
- Rear camera: Triple; 50 MP wide-angle, f/1.8 + 5 MP ultra wide, f/2.2 + 2MP depth senor, f/2.4 Video: 1080p@30fps
- Front camera: 8 MP wide-angle, f/2.0 Video: 1080p@30fps
- Display: 6.58" IPS LCD; Resolution: 1080 × 2408 px (20:9, 401 ppi density); Protection: Corning Gorilla Glass 5
- Data inputs: Fingerprint (side-mounted), accelerometer, gyro, proximity, compass

The Nokia G60 (also known as Nokia G60 5G) is an entry-level Android smartphone branded by Nokia and manufactured by HMD Global. It was announced and released on September 1, 2022 at IFA 2022 in Berlin. In India, the smartphone launched on November 1, 2022 and went on sales 7 days late after the official launch.

HMD prioritized the "3-3-3" promise - three software upgrades, three years of monthly security updates and a three-year warranty.

== Specifications ==
The panel at the back is made of 60% recycled plastic. In the front, it features a 6.58" IPS LCD with a refresh rate of 120Hz and protected with the Corning Gorilla Glass 5. The G60 is powered by the Qualcomm SM6375 Snapdragon 695 5G chipset with an octa-core (2x 2.2 GHz Kryo 660 Gold & 6x 1.7 GHz Kryo 660 Silver) and the Adreno 619 GPU.

The main camera features three lenses: 50 MP primary, 5 MP ultra-wide and 2 MP in-depth senor. The front camera featured an 8 MP wide-angle lens. Both cameras can record up to 1080p @ 30 fps.
