= Small nucleolar RNA Z50 =

Non-coding RNA molecule, which functions in the modification of other small nuclear RNAs

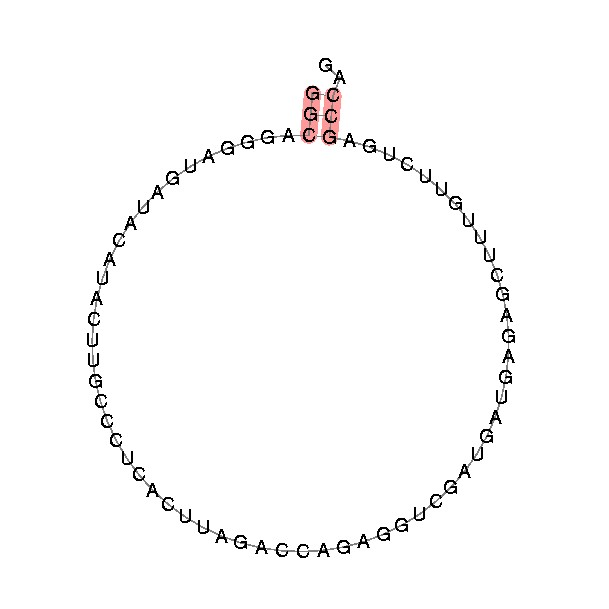

Identifiers
- Symbol: snoZ50
- Rfam: RF00347

Other data
- RNA type: Gene; snRNA; guide; C/D-box;
- PDB structures: PDBe

In molecular biology, Small nucleolar RNA Z50 is a non-coding RNA (ncRNA) molecule which functions in the modification of other small nuclear RNAs (snRNAs). This type of modifying RNA is usually located in the nucleolus of the eukaryotic cell which is a major site of snRNA biogenesis. It is known as a small nucleolar RNA (snoRNA) and also often referred to as a guide RNA.

snoRNA Z50 belongs to the C/D box class of snoRNAs which contain the conserved sequence motifs known as the C box (UGAUGA) and the D box (CUGA). Most of the members of the box C/D family function in directing site-specific 2'-O-methylation of substrate RNAs.

snoRNA Z50 was originally cloned from mouse brain tissues.
