= Redmi A1 =

Android smartphone made by Xiaomi

Redmi A1 Redmi A1+ (Poco C50 in India)

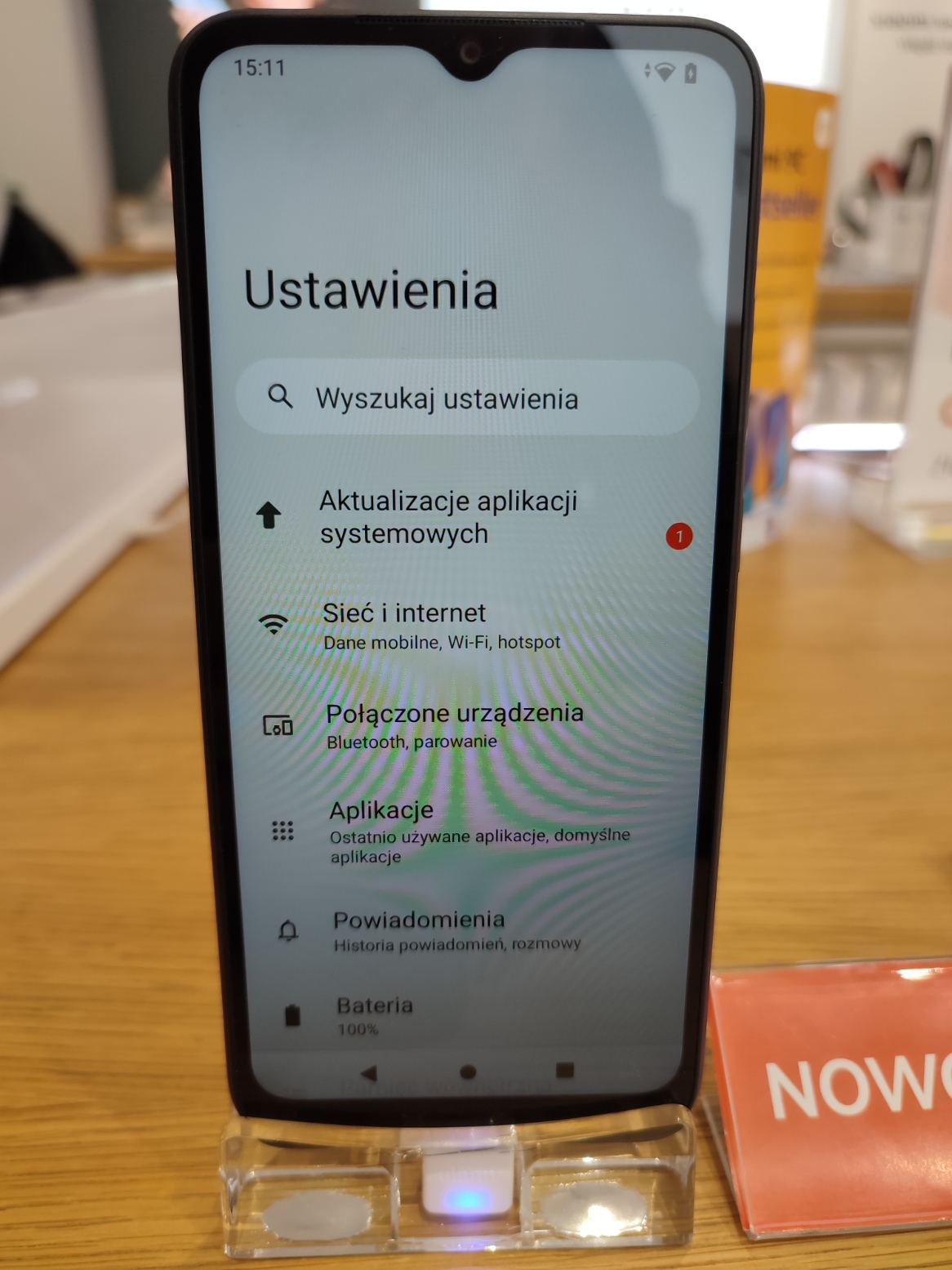
- The front of the Redmi A1
- Brand: Redmi; Poco C
- Manufacturer: Xiaomi
- Type: Phablet
- Series: Redmi A Poco
- First released: A1: September 9, 2022; 3 years ago A1+: September 9, 2022; 3 years ago Poco C50: January 3, 2023; 3 years ago
- Predecessor: Redmi Go; Poco C40
- Successor: Redmi A2
- Related: Poco C55
- Compatible networks: GSM / HSPA / LTE
- Form factor: Slate
- Colors: A1/A1+: Light Green, Light Blue, Black; Poco C50: Royal Blue, Country Green
- Dimensions: 164.9 mm (6.49 in) H 76.8 mm (3.02 in) W 9.1 mm (0.36 in) D
- Weight: 192 g (6.8 oz)
- Operating system: Android 12 (Go edition)
- System-on-chip: MediaTek MT6761 Helio A22 (12 nm)
- CPU: Quad-core 2.0 GHz Cortex-A53
- GPU: PowerVR GE8320
- Memory: 2 and 3 GB RAM
- Storage: 32 GB eMMC 5.1
- SIM: Dual SIM (Nano-SIM, dual stand-by)
- Battery: Li-Po 5000 mAh
- Charging: 10W
- Rear camera: 8 MP, f/2.0, (wide); 0.08 MP (QVGA); LED flash, HDR; 1080p@30fps
- Front camera: 5 MP, f/2.2; 1080p@30fps
- Display: 6.52 in (166 mm); 720 x 1600 px (HD+) resolution, 20:9 ratio (~269 ppi density); IPS LCD, 400 nits (typ)
- Sound: Speaker
- Connectivity: microUSB 2.0; Wi-Fi 802.11 a/b/g/n, hotspot Bluetooth 5.0, A2DP, LE
- Data inputs: Multi-touch screen; Accelerometer
- Water resistance: None
- Model: A1: 220733SG, 220733SI, 220733SL; A1+: 220733SFG; Poco C50: MZB0D3DIN
- Codename: A1: ice A1+/Poco C50: snow
- Website: www.mi.com/global/product/redmi-a1; www.mi.com/global/product/redmi-a1-plus

The Redmi A1 and Redmi A1+ are Android-based smartphones designed, marketed and manufactured by Xiaomi sub-brand Redmi. They were announced on September 6, 2022 and they were released on September 9, 2022. The smartphones have a MediaTek Helio A22 processor, leather design and 8MP dual camera. The Redmi A1+ features a fingerprint sensor.

The Redmi A1 is the first Redmi smartphone since Redmi Go that runs on Android Go.

In India, the Redmi A1+ was introduced as the Poco C50 with two color options with darker blue color.

== Design ==
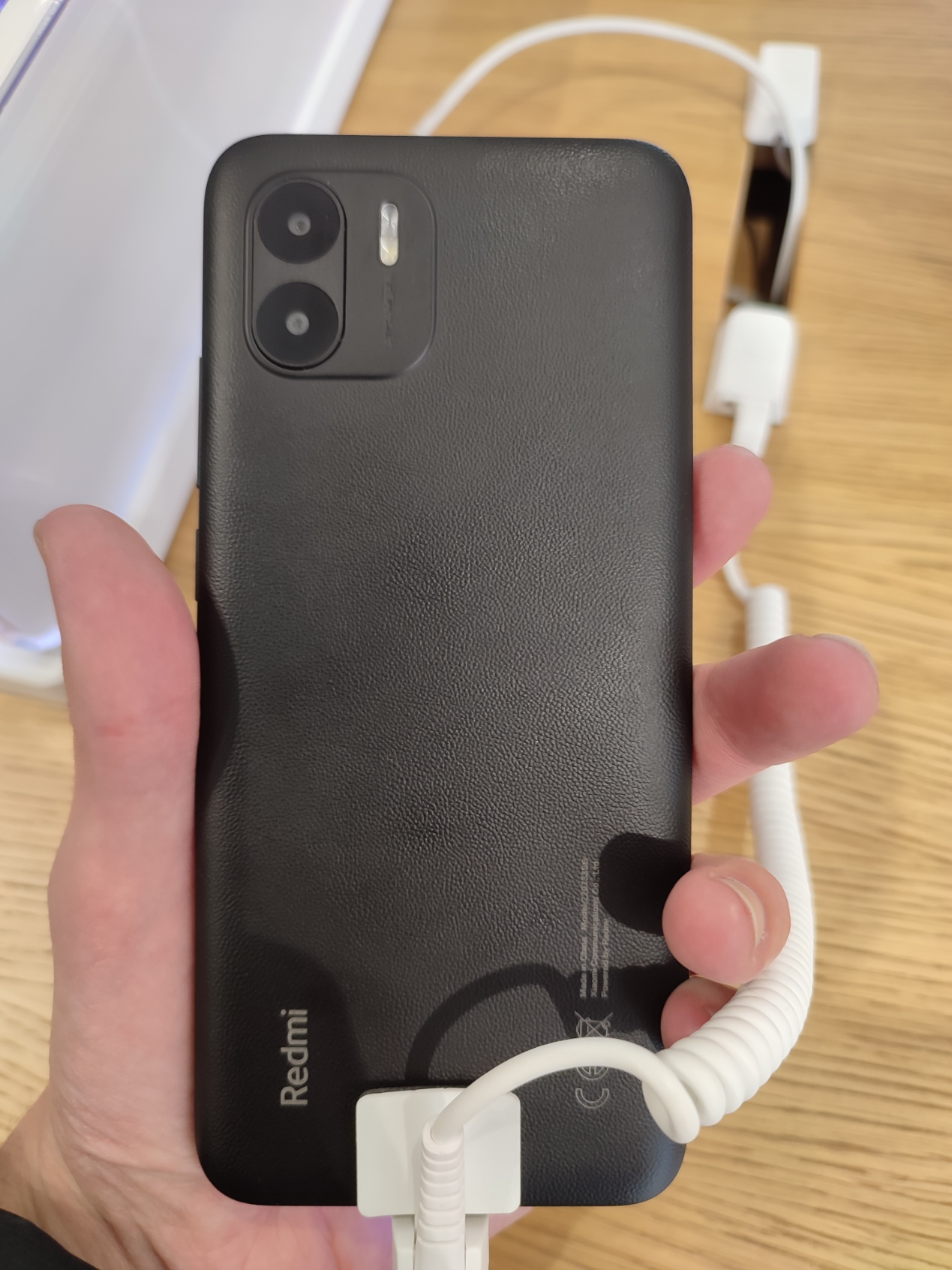
The back of the Redmi A1 in black color

The front of the smartphone is made of glass and the back is made of plastic with a leather-like texture. The design of the camera island is similar to that of the Xiaomi Mi 11.

On the bottom side, there is a microUSB port, an audio jack port, and a microphone. On the top side, there is a speaker. On the left side, there is a dual SIM tray with microSD slot. On the right side are the volume rocker and the power button.

The Redmi A1 and A1+ were available in 3 color options: Black, Light Blue and Light Green, while the Poco C50 was available in Royal Blue and Country Green color options.

== Specifications ==
=== Hardware ===
The smartphones feature the same MediaTek Helio A22 SoC with a PowerVR GE8300 GPU, which was previously used in the Redmi 6A. All three models were available in 2/32 GB and 3/32 GB memory configurations with LPPDR4X type of RAM and eMMC 5.1 type of ROM.

The smartphones are equipped with a non-removable 5000 mAh Li-Po battery that supports 10W charging.

Also, they feature a 6.52-inch display with IPS LCD technology at an HD+ (720 × 1600) image resolution, a 20:9 aspect ratio, a 269 ppi pixel density and a waterdrop notch.

The devices use a dual-camera system as the rear camera, consisting of an 8 MP wide-angle lens and a 0.08 MP (QVGA) auxiliary lens. There is also an 8 MP front camera.

=== Software ===
Smartphones use a slightly modified version of Android 12 (Go Edition), which is the version of Android for low-end smartphones.
