= Ulefone =

Chinese consumer electronics brand

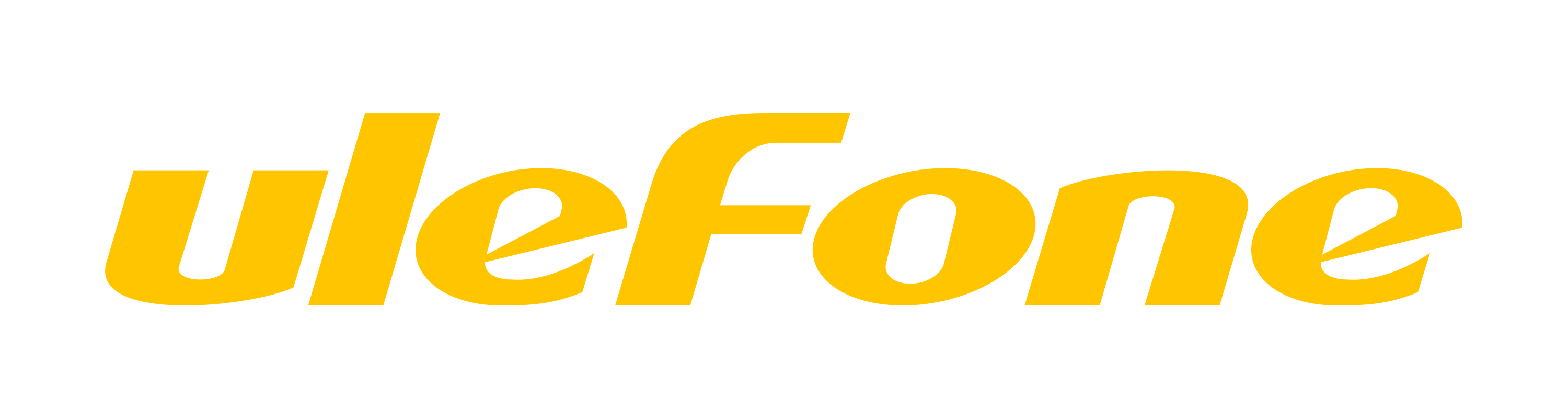
- Industry: Consumer electronics
- Founded: 2014
- Headquarters: Shenzhen, Guangdong, China
- Products: Rugged smartphone, rugged android tablets
- Owner: Shenzhen Gotron Electronic co., Ltd.

Ulefone (Chinese: 欧乐风; lit. 'Europe laugh wind') is a Chinese consumer electronics brand established in 2014, known for producing rugged smartphones and Android tablets. The company is based in Shenzhen and offers a range of devices across various tiers and form factors. Ulefone has been documented in regulatory filings, including FCC test reports. These reports identify Shenzhen Gotron Electronic Co., Ltd. as the applicant and manufacturer for some of the models marketed under the Ulefone name.

== History ==
Ulefone was founded in 2014. The Ulefone brand is owned by Shenzhen Gotron Electronic Group LTD, a Chinese company established in 2010 that manufactures mobile devices and accessories. Located in the Anhongji Tianyao Plaza, Longhua District in Shenzhen Guangdong, the company originally operated as an original equipment manufacturer (OEM), producing components and devices for other brands. In 2014, the Ulefone brand was registered, and the company introduced its initial line of branded smartphones, including the early Note series. Beginning in 2015, Ulefone focused on the rugged smartphone market, producing devices with features such as IP68 and IP69K water and dust resistance ratings and compliance with military-grade durability standards (MIL-STD-810H). By later the brand's products were distributed in more than 40 countries, including regions in Europe, North America, and Southeast Asia.

== Products ==
Ulefone's outdoor smartphones are marketed under the Armor name. TechRadar has described the Armor 24 as an outdoor phone designed with an emphasis on ruggedness and battery life. The Armor 27 T Pro highlighted models that integrate rugged design with sensors for thermal imaging and night vision using infrared technology. The device also features a specialized accessory connector called uSmart for additional peripherals. The Armor 26 Ultra (walkie-talkie version) described its built-in radio and walkie-talkie functionality, as well as optional accessories that connect via a specialized port, including devices like an endoscope.

=== Premium/flagship models ===
The Armor 28 Ultra has been noted for its infrared capabilities, night vision camera, and built-in thermal camera, as well as its use of MediaTek Dimensity 9300 plus chipset for high operating performance. It also features a dedicated port called "uSmart 2.0 Technology" for connecting accessories such as endoscopes and microscopes. NotebookCheck describes the Armor 28 Ultra as a flagship rugged smartphone with high-end hardware and software performance.

=== Rugged tablets ===
The Armor Pad series comprises rugged Android tablets that support accessories such as microscopes and endoscopes, depending on the model. The Armor Pad high brightness level and the versatility provided by the uSmart and audio connectors, while describing its overall performance as average.

== Awards and recognition ==
• The Armor 28 Ultra series received a "Best of CES 2025" recognition.

• In 2025, the company received the IFA Innovation Award after introducing the RugOne brand and the Armor 29 series.

• At MWC 2026, Ulefone and its sub-brand RugOne were recognized with nine "Best of Show" awards from various technology publications.
