= Nokia C200 =

2022 smartphone model

- Brand: Nokia
- Manufacturer: HMD Global
- Series: Nokia C series
- First released: 2022
- Compatible networks: 4G LTE
- Operating system: Android 12
- System-on-chip: MediaTek Helio A22
- Memory: 3 GB RAM
- Storage: 32 GB
- Battery: 4000 mAh
- Rear camera: 13 MP
- Front camera: 8 MP

The Nokia C200 is an entry-level Android smartphone developed by HMD Global and marketed under the Nokia brand. It was unveiled as part of HMD Global's affordable Nokia smartphone lineup announced around CES 2022, with availability announced for later release windows in 2022.

== Release ==
HMD Global announced the Nokia C200 during its early-2022 product announcements, including pricing and planned availability in select markets. The model was later listed as launched by HMD Global in September 2022 alongside the Nokia G100.

== Specifications ==
=== Hardware ===
The Nokia C200 is based on the MediaTek Helio A22 system-on-chip and ships with Android 12.

=== Cameras ===
HMD Global's launch materials and subsequent reports describe a single rear camera and a front-facing camera for basic photography and video calling.

=== Battery and charging ===
The device was announced with a 4,000 mAh battery, positioned for all-day usage depending on use patterns.

== See also ==
- Nokia
- List of Nokia products
