= Nokia C02 =

Entry-level LTE smartphone

- Brand: Nokia
- Manufacturer: HMD Global
- Type: Smartphone
- Series: C series
- First released: February 23, 2023
- Related: Nokia C12
- Compatible networks: GSM, HSPA, LTE
- Form factor: Slate
- Colors: Dark Cyan, Charcoal
- Dimensions: 148.7 mm × 71.2 mm × 10 mm (5.85 in × 2.80 in × 0.39 in)
- Weight: 191 g (6.7 oz)
- Operating system: Android 12 (Go edition)
- System-on-chip: Quad-core 1.4 GHz
- CPU: Quad-core 1.4 GHz
- Memory: 2 GB LPDDR4X
- Storage: 32 GB eMMC 5.1
- Removable storage: microSDXC (dedicated slot)
- Battery: 3000 mAh Li-Ion (removable)
- Charging: 5W wired
- Rear camera: 5 MP, LED flash, HDR; 720p@30fps video
- Front camera: 2 MP
- Display: 5.45 in (138 mm) IPS LCD; 720 x 1440 pixels, 18:9 ratio (~295 ppi density)
- Sound: Loudspeaker, 3.5mm jack
- Connectivity: Wi-Fi 802.11 b/g/n Bluetooth 4.2, A2DP; GPS; Micro-USB 2.0
- Data inputs: Accelerometer
- Water resistance: IP52 (dust and splash resistant)

The Nokia C02 is an entry-level Android LTE smartphone that manufactured by HMD Global under the brand Nokia as part of the C series. It was unveiled on February 23, 2023.

== Specifications ==
=== Design and hardware ===
The Nokia C02 is housed with a polycarbonate body and frame with a "nano-texture" finish. It is officially rated IP52, providing protection against dust and light water splashes.

One of its notable hardware features is a removable 3000 mAh battery, a rarity in modern smartphones, which supports 5W charging via a micro-USB port.

The device utilized a 5.45-inch IPS LCD display with an 18:9 aspect ratio and FWVGA+ resolution (720 x 1440 pixels). It is powered by an unnamed quad-core chipset clocked at 1.4 GHz, paired with 2 GB of RAM and 32 GB of eMMC 5.1 internal storage, which is expandable up to 256 GB via a dedicated microSD card slot.

=== Cameras ===
- Main Camera - It features a 5-megapixel sensor with an LED flash, supporting portrait mode and time-lapse.
- Selfie Camera - It features a 2-megapixel front-facing sensor, which also supports Face Unlock.

=== Software ===
The Nokia C02 runs on Android 12 (Go edition). HMD Global committed to providing two years of quarterly security updates for the device. The "Go edition" software is optimized for low-end hardware, featuring smaller app sizes and better data management.
