= Android Go =

Variant of the Android operating system for low-end devices

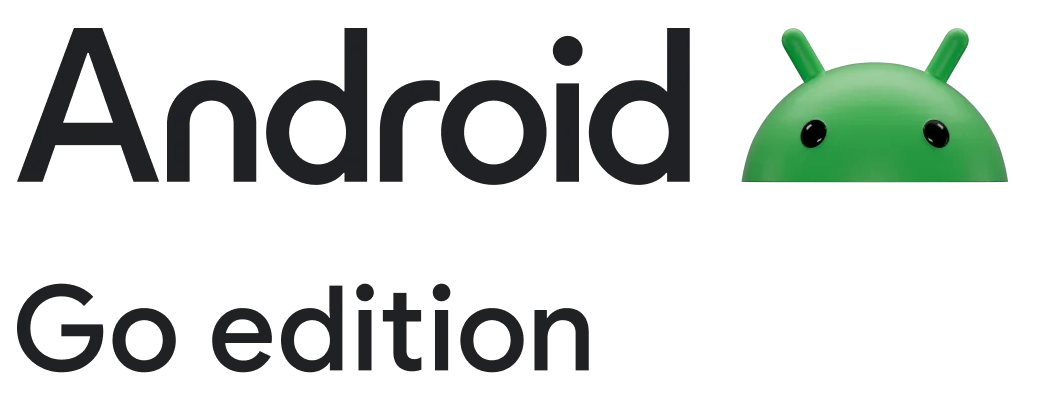

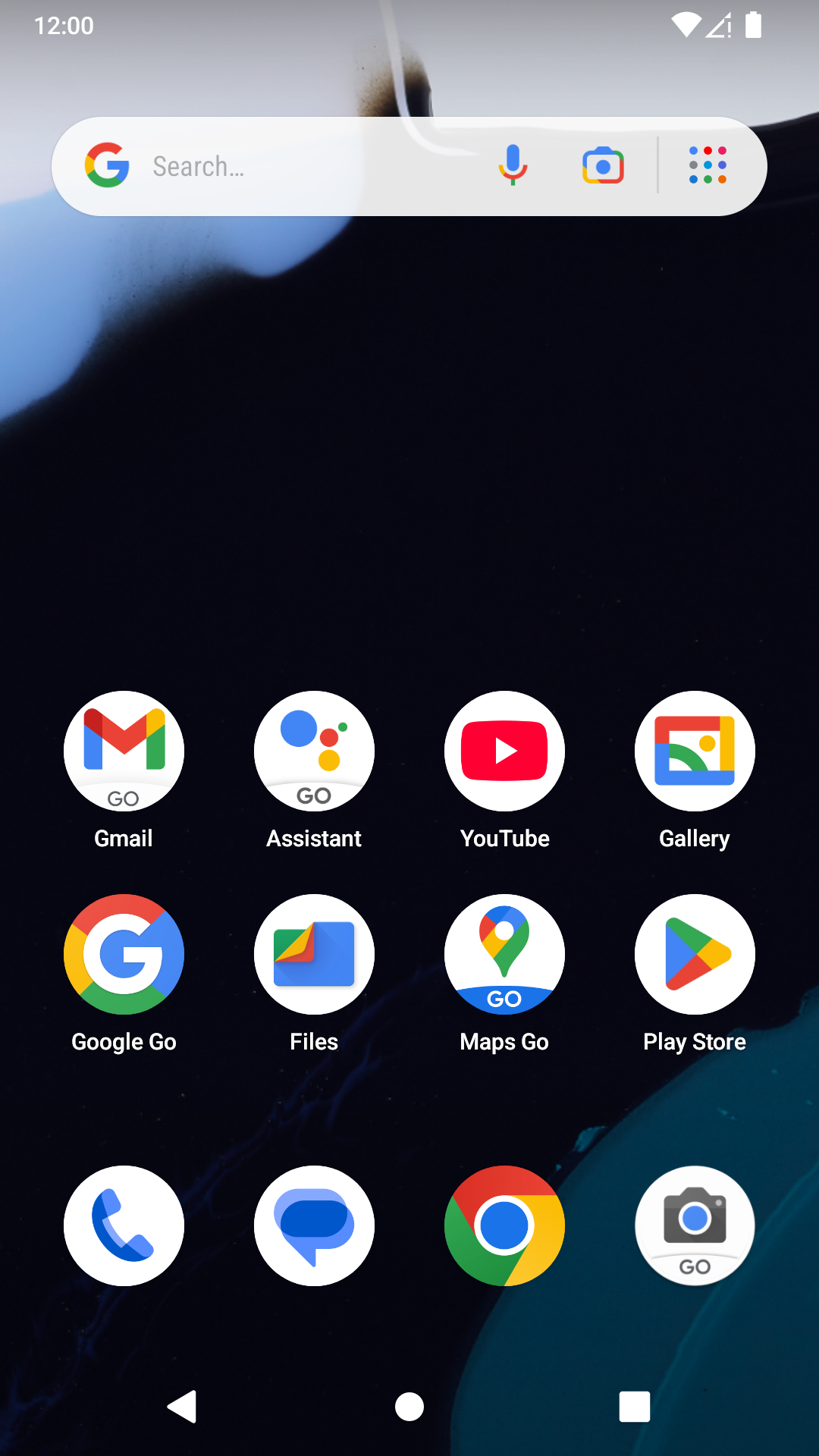
- Android Go 14 home screen with Pixel Launcher
- Developer: Various (mostly Google)
- OS family: Linux
- Working state: Security updates only
- Initial release: 8.1 (Go Edition) / December 5, 2017; 8 years ago
- Final release: 16 (Go Edition) / October 28, 2025; 12 months ago
- Marketing target: Low-end/ultra-budget smartphones (with 3 GB and 4 GB RAM)
- Supported platforms: arm64-v8a (64-bit) armeabi-v7a (32-bit)
- Official website: www.android.com/versions/go-edition/

Android Go, officially Android (Go edition), is a stripped-down version of the Android operating system, designed for low-end and ultra-budget smartphones (but also used by some tablets). It is intended for smartphones with 4 GB of RAM or lower and was first made available with the release of Android Oreo.

The first phone pre-installed with Android Go is the Alcatel 1X, which was released in February 2018.

== Features ==
Android Go has platform optimizations designed to reduce mobile data usage (including enabling Data Saver mode in Google Chrome by default), and a special suite of Google Mobile Services designed to be less resource- and bandwidth-intensive. The Google Play Services package was also modularized to reduce its memory footprint. The Google Play Store will highlight lighter apps suited for these devices.

The operating system's interface differs from that of stock Android, with the quick-settings panel giving greater prominence to information regarding the battery, mobile-data limit, and available storage; the recent apps menu uses a modified layout and is limited to four apps (in order to reduce RAM consumption), and an API for allowing mobile carriers to implement data-tracking and top-ups within the Android settings menu. Some system services, such as notification access, split screen, and picture-in-picture mode, are disabled to improve performance.

Most devices running Android Go use Google's "stock" Android GUI, although several manufacturers still use a customized GUI.

== Versions ==
Version	Android version numbers	Minimum RAM required	Android Go release date	Android release date	Days after release	End of support	Ref.
8.1 Oreo (Go edition)	8.1	512 MB	December 5, 2017	December 5, 2017	0	October 4, 2021	
9 Pie (Go edition)	9	512 MB	August 15, 2018	August 6, 2018	9	March 7, 2022	
10 (Go edition)	10	512 MB	September 25, 2019	September 3, 2019	22	March 6, 2023	
11 (Go edition)	11	1 GB	September 10, 2020	September 8, 2020	2	March 27, 2024	
12 (Go edition)	12	1 GB	December 14, 2021	October 4, 2021	71	March 31, 2025	
13 (Go edition)	13	2 GB	October 19, 2022	August 15, 2022	65	March 2, 2026	
14 (Go edition)	14	2 GB	December 15, 2023	October 4, 2023	72	Current	
15 (Go edition)	15	2 GB	March 21, 2025	September 3, 2024	199	Current	
16 (Go edition)	16	4 GB	October 28, 2025	June 10, 2025	140	Current	
Legend: Unsupported Supported Latest version

== See also ==
- Comparison of Android Go products
- Android One, a version of Android originally designed for entry-level and budget devices
- One UI Core, a similar software developed by Samsung for entry-level Galaxy smartphones from 2019 to 2023
