= UNISOC =

Chinese semiconductor company based at Shanghai, formerly known as Spreadtrum

UNISOC (Shanghai) Technologies Co., Ltd.
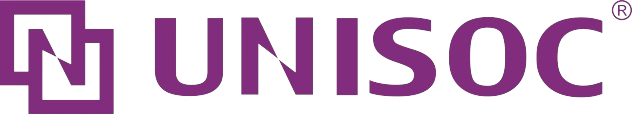
- Native name: 紫光展锐（上海）科技股份有限公司
- Industry: Semiconductor industry
- Predecessor: Spreadtrum Communications; RDA Microelectronics
- Founded: April 2001; 25 years ago (as Spreadtrum Communications)
- Headquarters: Shanghai, China
- Key people: Ma Daojie (chairman); Ren Qiwei (CEO)
- Products: Mobile communication chipsets; IoT chipsets; Automotive chipsets
- Revenue: CN¥14.5 billion (2024)
- Parent: Tsinghua Unigroup
- Website: www.unisoc.com

UNISOC (Shanghai) Technologies Co., Ltd. (Chinese: 紫光展锐; pinyin: Zǐguāng Zhǎnruì) is a Chinese fabless semiconductor company headquartered in Shanghai. It designs semiconductor products for smartphones, Internet of Things devices, automotive electronics and other connected devices. UNISOC is part of Tsinghua Unigroup.

UNISOC started in 2001 as Spreadtrum Communications. Tsinghua Unigroup acquired Spreadtrum in 2013 and fellow semiconductor company RDA Microelectronics in 2014, integrating the two businesses under the UNISOC brand in 2018.

Since the early 2020s, UNISOC has become one of the world's largest suppliers of smartphone systems-on-chip by shipment volume. In the first quarter of 2026, it accounted for 14% of global smartphone SoC shipments, ranking fourth behind MediaTek, Qualcomm and Apple.

== History ==
UNISOC traces its origins to Spreadtrum Communications, founded in 2001 as a fabless semiconductor company developing wireless communications chips. Spreadtrum was listed on the Nasdaq from 2007.

In 2013, Tsinghua Unigroup acquired Spreadtrum for approximately US$1.78 billion. The following year, it acquired RDA Microelectronics for US$907 million.

Also in 2014, Intel agreed to invest up to US$1.5 billion for an approximately 20% stake in a Tsinghua Unigroup holding company containing Spreadtrum and RDA. Intel invested US$966 million in 2015; a planned second investment was later cancelled by mutual agreement.

In 2018, Spreadtrum and RDA were integrated under the UNISOC brand.

UNISOC expanded rapidly in the smartphone processor market during 2021. Its smartphone SoC shipments more than doubled during the year, reaching 11% of global shipments in the fourth quarter.

Plans for a listing on the STAR Market were delayed during the bankruptcy restructuring of Tsinghua Unigroup, which was completed in 2022. UNISOC later resumed preparations for a possible public listing and raised RMB 4 billion in equity financing in 2024.

In the first half of 2026, UNISOC continued to gain share in the global smartphone SoC market despite a decline in overall shipments, helped by increased adoption of its lower-cost 4G and entry-level 5G platforms.

== Research and development ==
UNISOC has more than 5,000 employees, over 85% of whom work in research and development, and operates 19 R&D centers worldwide. UNISOC and its predecessor Spreadtrum have developed chipsets for successive generations of cellular technology, from GSM and TD-SCDMA to LTE and 5G.

The company participates in the development of cellular telecommunications standards. Spreadtrum and UNISOC have declared patents associated with 3GPP 5G specifications, and UNISOC has participated in drafting Chinese industry standards for technologies including 5G Reduced Capability (RedCap).

UNISOC also participates in research on 6G through China's IMT-2030 (6G) Promotion Group.

== Main products ==
Currently, UNISOC's main products include mobile system-on-chips, baseband chips, AI chips, radio frequency chips, and other communication, computing, and control chips, which are widely used in consumer electronic devices such as smartphones, tablets, and smart wearables.

=== Mocor RTOS ===
Mocor is a proprietary real-time operating system developed by Unigroup Spreadtrum (currently part of UNISOC), used in 4G dumb/feature phones. Mocor (supposedly short for Mobile core), does not have its own kernel, and is typically used with a third party kernel such as ThreadX.

== See also ==
- Semiconductor industry
- Semiconductor industry in China
- Allwinner
- Intel Atom
- HiSilicon
- Freescale i.MX
- Leadcore Technology
- MediaTek
- MStar Semiconductors
- Nufront
- Rockchip
- Qualcomm Snapdragon
- Nvidia Tegra
- Broadcom VideoCore
