= List of mobile phone brands by country =

This is a list of mobile phone brands sorted by the country from which the brands originate. The number of mobile phone brands peaked to more than 750 in 2017 before declining to nearly 250 brands in 2023.

Bold refers to major smartphone brands.

== Existing ==
| Country | Brand | Notes |
|---|---|---|
| Algeria | Condor Electronics | |
| Bangladesh | Symphony | |
| Bangladesh | Walton | |
| China | Coolpad | Listed by Hong Kong Stock Exchange |
| China | Cubot | |
| China | Honor | |
| China | Huawei | |
| China | Infinix | Subsidiary of Transsion |
| China | Itel Mobile | Subsidiary of Transsion |
| China | iQOO | Subsidiary of Vivo |
| China | Nubia | |
| China | OnePlus | Subsidiary of Oppo |
| China | Oppo | |
| China | Oukitel | |
| China | Poco | Subsidiary of Xiaomi |
| China | Realme | Subsidiary of Oppo |
| China | Redmagic | Subsidiary of Nubia and used under license by ZTE |
| China | Redmi | Subsidiary of Xiaomi |
| China | TCL Corporation | |
| China | Tecno Mobile | Subsidiary of Transsion |
| China | Ulefone | |
| China | Umidigi | |
| China | Unihertz | |
| China | Vivo | |
| China | Xiaomi | |
| China | ZTE | |
| Czech Republic | Jablotron | Makers of desktop smartphones under the Noabe brand |
| Czech Republic | Evolveo | |
| Egypt | SICO Technology | |
| Finland | Jolla | |
| Finland | HMD Global | Develops Nokia branded feature phones and HMD branded smartphones since 2016 |
| France | Archos | |
| France | Alcatel Mobile | Subsidiary of Nokia and used under license by TCL Technology |
| France | Crosscall | |
| France | Groupe Bull | |
| France | Kapsys | |
| France | Logicom | |
| France | MobiWire | Formerly Sagem Wireless |
| France | Wiko | |
| Germany | Gigaset | |
| Germany | Medion | Subsidiary of Lenovo |
| Germany | SHIFT | |
| Germany | TechniSat | |
| Germany | Tiptel | |
| Hong Kong | Lenovo | |
| Hong Kong | Vertu | |
| India | Ai+ | |
| India | boltt | |
| India | CMF | formerly a subsidiary of Nothing |
| India | IKALL | |
| India | Lava | |
| India | Karbonn | |
| India | MIVI | |
| India | Wobble | |
| Indonesia | Evercoss | |
| Iran | GLX | Also known as "General Luxe" |
| Iran | Daria | Sub-brand of Daria Hamraah. Also sold in UAE. |
| Iran | Gplus | |
| Italy | Brondi | |
| Italy | Q.Bell | Subsidiary of Hidis |
| Italy | New Generation Mobile | |
| Italy | Olivetti | |
| Japan | Fujitsu | |
| Japan | Kyocera | |
| Japan | Panasonic | |
| Japan | Sharp | |
| Japan | Sony | |
| Mexico | Kyoto Electronics | |
| Mexico | Lanix | |
| Mexico | Zonda | |
| Netherlands | Fairphone | |
| Netherlands | John's Phone | |
| Netherlands | Philips | |
| North Korea | Arirang | |
| Pakistan | QMobile | |
| Philippines | Cherry Mobile | Brand by Cosmic Technologies |
| Philippines | Starmobile | |
| Philippines | MyPhone | Brand by Solid Group |
| Philippines | Torque Mobile | Topstrasse Global |
| Poland | Kruger&Matz | |
| Poland | Manta Multimedia | |
| Poland | myPhone (Poland) | |
| Romania | Allview | |
| Romania | Evolio | |
| Romania | E-Boda | |
| Romania | Myria | |
| Romania | Utok | |
| Russia | Beeline | |
| Russia | Explay | Subsidiary of Fly |
| Russia | Gresso | |
| Russia | Highscreen | |
| Russia | Megafon | |
| Russia | MTS | |
| Russia | RoverPC | |
| Russia | teXet | |
| Russia | Sitronics | |
| Russia | Yotaphone | |
| South Africa | Cell C | |
| South Africa | MTN | |
| South Africa | Mobicel | |
| South Africa | Telkom | |
| South Africa | Vodacom | |
| South Korea | Samsung | |
| Sweden | Doro | Subsidiary of Xplora |
| Taiwan | Acer | |
| Thailand | Wellcom | |
| Turkey | Reedme | |
| Turkey | Casper | |
| Turkey | General Mobile | |
| Tunisia | EvertekTunisie | |
| United Arab Emirates | Thuraya | |
| United Kingdom | Nothing | |
| United States | Apple | |
| United States | BLU Products | Rebadged |
| United States | Caterpillar | |
| United States | Google Pixel | |
| United States | InFocus | |
| United States | Motorola Mobility | Subsidiary of Lenovo |
| United States | Purism, SPC | |
| United States | T-Mobile | Rebadged Wingtech smartphones |
| United States | Trump Mobile | Rebadged HTC smartphones |
| Zimbabwe | GTel | |

== Defunct ==
| Country | Brand | Notes |
|---|---|---|
| Armenia | Armphone | |
| Canada | Jeotex (Datawind) | Bankruptcy in 2021 |
| China | Gionee | Bankruptcy in 2018, acquired by Karbonn Mobiles |
| China | IUNI | Subsidiary of Gionee, defunct in 2016 |
| China | Kejian | Bankruptcy in 2013 |
| China | LeEco | Bankruptcy in 2017 |
| China | Vsun | Bankruptcy in 2019 |
| China | ZUK Mobile | Subsidiary of Lenovo, defunct in 2017 |
| China | Technology Happy Life | |
| China | Gfive | |
| Czech Republic | Verzo | Last phone in 2011 |
| Germany | AEG | |
| Germany | BenQ Mobile | Bankruptcy in 2006, defunct in 2007 |
| Germany | Grundig Mobile | |
| Germany | Hagenuk Telecom GmbH | Insolvency in 1997, mobile phone development and manufacturing business acquired by Telital in 1998 |
| Germany | Siemens Mobile | Acquired by BenQ Corporation in 2005 to form BenQ Mobile |
| Germany | Telefunken | |
| Greece | MLS | |
| Hong Kong | X-tigi Mobile | |
| Italy | Onda Mobile Communication | |
| India | YU Televentures | Was a subsidiary of Micromax |
| India | 10.or | Subsidiary of Huaqin Telecom Technology Co., Ltd., defunct in 2021 |
| India | Xolo | Subsidiary of Lava |
| Indonesia | Nexian | |
| Iran | DIMO | Made tablets and smartphones. Assembly kits bought from China and assembled in Ahwaz. |
| Japan | Akai | |
| Japan | Sanyo | |
| Japan | Sansui | Defunct in 2014 |
| Japan | NEC | |
| Latvia | Just5 | |
| Spain | GeeksPhone | |
| Spain | Vitelcom | |
| Spain | Energy Sistem | |
| Spain | BQ | After having a majority acquired by VinSmart/Vingroup in 2018, BQ ceased operations; liquidating in 2021. |
| Switzerland | Autophon | |
| Thailand | I-Mobile | Defunct in 2017 |
| United Kingdom | Bullitt Group | |
| United Kingdom | Vertu | Bankruptcy in 2017, acquired and relaunched by Hong Kong based Baferton |
| United Kingdom | Kazam | |
| United Kingdom | Wileyfox | |
| United States | Essential Products | |
| United States | iDroid USA | |
| United States | InfoSonics | |
| United States | Microsoft Mobile | Established in 2014 following the acquisition of Nokia's Devices and Services division by Microsoft, defunct in 2017 |
| United States | Nextbit | Defunct in 2017 |
| United States | Obi Worldphone | Defunct in 2018 |
| Vietnam | VinSmart | Subsidiary of Vingroup. Production closed due to the COVID-19 pandemic. Sales and services for VinSmart smartphones still continue to operate. |
| Vietnam | Avio | Sub-brand of Vietnam Telecommunications and Electronic Cables Joint Stock Company (VINACAP), a subsidiary of VNPT. The brand was launched for the low-end market and targeted to users of Vinaphone's services. The brand ceased operation in c. 2016 due to poor sales. |
| Vietnam | Hi-Mobile | Subsidiary of HiPT |
| Vietnam | Bluefone | Subsidiary of CMC Cooperation |
| Vietnam | Mobiistar | |
| Vietnam | Asanzo | |
| Vietnam | Kangaroo Mobile | |
| Vietnam | Maxfone | |
| Vietnam | Q-Mobile | |

== No longer associated with mobile phones ==
| Country | Brand | Notes |
|---|---|---|
| Australia | Kogan | Ended production in 2019 |
| Bangladesh | Okapia | Discontinued its own line of mobile phones and became a national distributor for Chinese mobile brand Honor. |
| Bangladesh | Proton | |
| Brazil | Gradiente | |
| Brazil | Multilaser | |
| Brazil | Positivo | |
| Canada | BlackBerry Limited | Ended smartphone production in 2016; brand licensing agreement with TCL Communication ended in 2020. |
| China | Konka | |
| China | Meitu | |
| China | Meizu | In 2026, Meizu announced they would no longer be manufacturing mobile phones. |
| China | Ningbo Bird | |
| China | Smartisan | Announced they would no longer be manufacturing mobile phones and focus on supporting new parent company ByteDance. |
| China | Wasam | |
| China | Haier | Haier announced they would no longer be manufacturing mobile phones. |
| Finland | Nokia | replaced with HMD branded phones |
| India | Intex Technologies | Announced they would no longer be manufacturing mobile phones. |
| India | Micromax | Micromax announced they would no longer be manufacturing mobile phones. |
| India | Celkon | Announced they would no longer be manufacturing mobile phones. |
| Iran | Iran Electronics Industries | |
| Iran | X-Vision | |
| Italy | Telit | |
| Japan | Casio | |
| Japan | Hitachi | |
| Japan | Japan Radio | |
| Japan | Toshiba | |
| Japan | Mitsubishi Electric | |
| Malaysia | Ninetology | Now an electric bicycle branded as E-Nine |
| South Korea | LG | In 2021, LG announced they would no longer be manufacturing mobile phones. |
| Sweden | Ericsson | On January 26, 2012, the European Union approved the buyout. On February 16, 2012, Sony announced it had completed the full acquisition of Sony Ericsson. On January 7, 2013, Sony Mobile completed moving its headquarters from Lund, Sweden to Tokyo, Japan in order to fully integrate with its parent company. |
| Switzerland | Ascom | |
| Taiwan | Asus | In 2026, Asus announced they would no longer be manufacturing mobile phones. |
| Taiwan | Gigabyte Technology | |
| Taiwan | BenQ | |
| Taiwan | DBTel | |
| Taiwan | HTC | Ended smartphone production. |
| Turkey | Vestel | |
| United States | Dell | |
| United States | HP | |
| United States | Garmin | |
| United States | Microsoft | |
