= Cherry Mobile Flare S7 Plus =

Android smartphone from Cherry Mobile

- Brand: Cherry Mobile
- Manufacturer: Cherry Mobile
- Type: Smartphone
- Series: Flare S7 series
- First released: September 2018; 7 years ago
- Discontinued: July 25, 2019; 7 years ago
- Predecessor: Cherry Mobile Flare S6 Plus
- Successor: Cherry Mobile Flare S8 Plus
- Form factor: Slate
- Dimensions: 155 mm (6.1 in) H 75.5 mm (2.97 in) W 7.8 mm (0.31 in) D
- Weight: 199 g (7.0 oz)
- Operating system: Android 8.1 "Oreo"
- System-on-chip: MediaTek Helio P60
- CPU: Octa Core (4x Cortex-A73 @ 2.0GHz & 4x Cortex-A53 @ 2.0GHz)
- GPU: Mali-G72 MP3
- Memory: 4GB
- Storage: 64GB
- Removable storage: MicroSDXC Expandable up to 256GB
- SIM: Hybrid Dual-SIM Slot (nanoSIM)
- Battery: 3050 mAh Li-ion Battery
- Charging: Standard 10W Charging and 5W Wireless Charging
- Rear camera: Dual: 16MP Main Camera (f/2.0) + 5MP Depth Sensor, Autofocus and LED Flash
- Front camera: Single: 16MP Main Camera (f/2.0)
- Display: 6.18 in (157 mm) FHD+ 1080x2246 IPS LCD, (402 ppi) with 19:9 Aspect Ratio, Corning Gorilla Glass 3
- Sound: DTS Audio, USB Type-C Audio Output
- Connectivity: Wi-Fi 802.11 b/g/n; Wi-Fi Direct; Bluetooth 4.1; BLE; USB-C Port
- Data inputs: A-GPS; Accelerometer; Ambient Light Sensor; Compass; Fingerprint Scanner; Gyroscope; Proximity Sensor

The Cherry Mobile Flare S7 Plus is a Android-based smartphone manufactured by Cherry Mobile. Unveiled on September 2018 in the Philippines.

== Specifications ==
=== Hardware ===
==== Chipset ====
The Flare S7 Plus is powered by 4x Cortex-A73 @ 2.0GHz & 4x Cortex-A53 @ 2.0GHz octa-core processors with MediaTek Helio P60 SoC. The SoC is based on the 12nm processing technology node. The smartphone also feature an Mali-G72 MP3 GPU.

==== Storage ====
The Flare S7 Plus has a hybrid dual SIM slot and comes equipped with 64 GB of ROM and 4 GB of RAM and has additional memory via MicroSD for extra storage up to 256 GB.

==== Camera ====
The Flare S7 Plus has 2 cameras, which are a dual-camera setup. The rear camera have a 16 MP with an f/2.0 lens and 5 MP depth camera. The front has a single 16 MP camera with an f/2.0 lens.

==== Display ====
The Flare S7 Plus is equipped with an LTPS display with a 6.18-inch Full HD+ 1080x2246 resolution and a screen ratio of 19:9. The display has Corning Gorilla Glass 3 protection.

==== Battery ====
The Flare S7 Plus is equipped with a 3050 Li-on mAh battery. This battery only supports 10W standard charging and has a 5W wireless charging capability.

== Software ==
The Flare S7 Lite operates on Android 8.1 Oreo, which is a stock version of Android 8.1.
