= MyPhone Rio Fun =

Android smartphone from MyPhone

- Brand: MyPhone
- Manufacturers: MySolid Technologies & Devices Corp
- Type: Smartphone
- Series: MyPhone Rio series
- First released: May 29, 2014
- Discontinued: Yes
- Compatible networks: 2G GSM 900 / 1800
- Form factor: Slate
- Colors: Black; White; Red; Blue; Yellow; Green; Orange
- Dimensions: 143.00×72.00×9.50 mm (5.630×2.835×0.374 in)
- Operating system: Android 4.2.2 (Jelly Bean)
- System-on-chip: MediaTek MT6572
- CPU: 1.3 GHz dual-core Cortex-A7
- GPU: Mali-400
- Memory: 512 MB RAM
- Storage: 512 MB ROM
- Removable storage: microSD (up to 32 GB)
- SIM: Dual SIM (Standard + Micro), Dual Standby
- Battery: Removable Li-Ion 1800 mAh
- Rear camera: 3.2 MP with LED flash
- Front camera: 0.3 MP (VGA)
- Display: 5.0 in (127 mm) TFT LCD; 480 x 854 pixels (~196 ppi density)
- Made in: China

The MyPhone Rio Fun is an entry-level Android smartphone released by the Filipino brand MyPhone on May 29, 2014 at Sky Ranch, Tagaytay as part of the Rio series. These covers are available in an array of colors, specifically red, blue, green, yellow, orange, purple, white, and black.

== Specifications ==
=== Hardware ===
Under the hood, the device is powered by a 1.3 GHz dual-core MediaTek MT6572M processor paired with a Mali-400 MP graphics processing unit. It is configured with 512 MB of RAM and an internal storage capacity of 512 MB, which can be expanded by up to 32 GB via an external microSD memory card. The phone is equipped with a user-replaceable 1,800 mAh lithium-ion battery.

=== Display ===
The phone features a 5.0-inch FWVGA TFT display panel. This screen outputs a resolution of 480 x 854 pixels, which yields a pixel density of approximately 206 pixels per inch (PPI).

=== Cameras ===
The rear-facing camera configuration consists of a 3.2-megapixel primary camera paired with a dual LED flash to assist with low-light photography. On the front, the phone houses a standard VGA sensor.

=== Software ===
The MyPhone Rio Fun runs on the Android 4.2 Jelly Bean operating system. The software environment is designed to handle dual SIM and dual standby setups, and it allows users to install applications directly onto an inserted microSD card to bypass the limited internal system storage. It was updated to Android 4.4 KitKat in November 2014.
