= MyPhone Iceberg Mini =

Android smartphone from MyPhone

- Brand: MyPhone
- Developer: MyPhone
- Manufacturer: MyPhone
- Type: Smartphone
- Series: Agua Series
- First released: November 29, 2013
- Predecessor: MyPhone Agua Iceberg
- Successor: MyPhone Iceberg Slim
- Compatible networks: GSM, 3G, HSPA+
- Form factor: Slate
- Colors: Black; White
- Dimensions: 128.3 mm (5.05 in) H 71 mm (2.8 in) W 8.6 mm (0.34 in) D
- Operating system: Android 4.2 (Jelly Bean)
- System-on-chip: MediaTek MT6589T
- CPU: 1.5 GHz quad-core
- GPU: PowerVR SGX544
- Memory: 2 GB
- Storage: 16 GB
- Removable storage: None
- SIM: Dual SIM
- Battery: 2000 mAh Li-Ion
- Charging: Micro-USB
- Rear camera: 13 MP, BSI sensor, autofocus, LED flash
- Front camera: 5 MP, BSI sensor
- Display: 5.0 in (130 mm) IPS LCD; 1080 × 1920 pixels (~441 ppi); Corning Gorilla Glass 2

The MyPhone Iceberg Mini is an Android smartphone released by the Philippine mobile phone brand MyPhone on November 29, 2013 at the Yahoo! Technostorm event in Market Market Activity Center. Marketed as a compact variant of the company's flagship MyPhone Iceberg, the device featured upgraded internal specifications despite its smaller form factor.

== Specifications ==
=== Display ===
The MyPhone Iceberg Mini features a 5.0-inch IPS OGS (One Glass Solution) LCD touchscreen with a Full HD (1920×1080) resolution, protected by scratch-resistant Corning Gorilla Glass 2.

=== Hardware ===
Under the hood, the device is powered by a MediaTek MT6589T system-on-chip (SoC) and integrates a quad-core 1.5 GHz ARM Cortex-A7 CPU and a 357 MHz PowerVR SGX544 GPU.

It is paired with 2 GB of RAM and 16 GB of internal storage (12.5 GB available to the user), which is non-expandable. For network connectivity, it supports dual Micro-SIM cards with dual 3G standby, 3G HSPA+, Wi-Fi, and Bluetooth 4.0.

The device is equipped with a 2,000 mAh Lithium-Ion (Li-Ion) battery.

=== Cameras ===
- Rear Camera: 13-megapixel autofocus main camera featuring a Backside Illuminated (BSI) sensor, LED flash, and 1080p Full HD video recording capabilities.
- Front Camera: 5-megapixel front-facing camera equipped with a BSI sensor for improved low-light self-portraits and video calls.

=== Software ===
The Iceberg Mini launched running Android 4.2.1 Jelly Bean.
