= MyPhone Rio Craze =

Android smartphone from MyPhone

- Brand: MyPhone
- Manufacturer: Solid Group Inc.
- Type: Smartphone
- Series: MyPhone Rio series
- First released: July 2014
- Discontinued: Yes
- Successor: MyPhone Rio 2 Craze
- Compatible networks: 2G (GSM 900 / 1800)
- Form factor: Slate
- Colors: Black; White; Yellow; Orange; Pink; Cyan; Blue
- Dimensions: 124.30×63.80×10.50 mm (4.894×2.512×0.413 in)
- Operating system: Android 4.4 (KitKat)
- System-on-chip: MediaTek MT6571
- CPU: 1.3 GHz dual-core
- GPU: Mali-400
- Memory: 256 MB RAM
- Storage: 512 MB
- Removable storage: microSD (up to 32 GB)
- SIM: Dual-SIM
- Battery: 1300 mAh
- Rear camera: 1.3 MP with LED flash
- Front camera: 0.3 MP (VGA)
- Display: 4.0 in (102 mm) WVGA TFT LCD; 480 x 800 pixels (~223 ppi density)

The MyPhone Rio Craze is an entry-level Android smartphone designed and marketed by the Philippine mobile brand MyPhone. Released on July 26, 2014, at the Market Market Activity Center in Taguig, the device was marketed as the brand's most affordable Android KitKat smartphone, launching at a retail price of ₱1,999.

== Specifications ==
=== Design ===
The MyPhone Rio Craze features a standard compact slate form factor common among early budget smartphones. It uses a lightweight, plastic chassis with colorful, interchangeable back covers consistent with the aesthetic theme of MyPhone's "Rio" product series.

=== Hardware ===
The device is powered by a 1.3 GHz dual-core MediaTek MT6571 processor. It includes a memory configuration limited to 256 MB of RAM alongside 512 MB of built-in internal storage. The internal storage capacity can be expanded up to 32 GB using a dedicated microSD memory card slot. A removable 1,300 mAh battery provides operational power to the smartphone.

=== Display ===
The smartphone is equipped with a 4.0-inch WVGA display panel. It features a native screen resolution of 800×480 pixels, yielding an approximate pixel density of 223 pixels per inch (ppi).

=== Cameras ===
The Rio Craze offers a dual-camera layout. The primary rear-facing camera has a 1.3-megapixel fixed-focus sensor accompanied by a single LED flash. A basic VGA sensor is mounted on the front of the device.

=== Software ===
The MyPhone Rio Craze ships with the Android 4.4 KitKat operating system pre-installed out of the box.
