= Cherry Mobile Flare S7 Mini =

Low-end Android smartphone from Cherry Mobile

- Brand: Cherry Mobile
- Manufacturer: Cherry Mobile
- Type: Smartphone
- Series: Flare
- Family: Flare S7
- First released: October 1, 2018; 7 years ago
- Compatible networks: 3G HSPA+, 2G EDGE & GPRS Networks
- Form factor: Slate
- Colors: Black, Gold, Purple
- Dimensions: 140.5 mm (5.53 in) H 65.4 mm (2.57 in) W 9.5 mm (0.37 in) D
- Weight: 129 g (4.6 oz)
- Operating system: Android 8.1 Oreo (Go Edition)
- System-on-chip: Spreadtrum SC7731E
- CPU: Quad Core (4x Cortex-A7 @ 1.3 GHz)
- GPU: Mali-T820
- Memory: 1 GB RAM
- Storage: 8 GB ROM
- Removable storage: MicroSDXC Expandable up to 64 GB via microSD
- SIM: Dual SIM (Nano-SIM)
- Battery: 2000 mAh Li-ion (Removable)
- Charging: 10 W standard charging
- Rear camera: Single: 8 MP, Autofocus, LED Flash
- Front camera: Single: 2 MP
- Display: 5.0 in (130 mm) 480x960 FWVGA+ Capacitive LCD (215 ppi) with 18:9 Aspect Ratio
- Sound: 3.5mm Audio Jack, FM Radio
- Connectivity: Wi-Fi 802.11 b/g/n; Bluetooth 4.2; USB Micro USB 2.0; A-GPS
- Data inputs: Accelerometer; Ambient Light Sensor; Proximity Sensor
- Website: www.cherrymobile.com.ph

The Cherry Mobile Flare S7 Mini is an Android-based smartphone manufactured by Cherry Mobile unveiled in October 2018 in the Philippines.

== Specifications ==
=== Hardware ===
==== Chipset ====
The Flare S7 Mini is powered by 4x ARM Cortex-A7 @ 1.3 GHz quad-core with Spreadtrum SC7731E SoC. The smartphone also feature an Mali-T820 GPU.

==== Storage ====
The Flare S7 Mini has a dedicated dual SIM slot and comes equipped with 8 GB of ROM and 1 GB of RAM. The device supports additional storage via a MicroSD card, expandable up to 64 GB.

==== Camera ====
The Flare S7 Mini features an 8 MP rear camera with autofocus and LED flash. The front camera is a 2 MP sensor.

==== Display ====
The Flare S7 Mini is equipped with a 5.0-inch FWVGA+ capacitive LCD display, offering a resolution of 480 x 960 pixels and a pixel density of 215 ppi. The screen features an 18:9 aspect ratio.

==== Battery ====
The Flare S7 Mini is equipped with a 2000 mAh removable Li-ion battery. This battery only supports 10 W standard charging.

== Software ==
The Flare S7 Mini operates on Android 8.1 Oreo (Go Edition), which is a stock version of Android optimized for entry-level devices.
