= Cherry Mobile Flare S7 Prime =

Low-end Android smartphone from Cherry Mobile

- Brand: Cherry Mobile
- Manufacturer: Cherry Mobile
- First released: October 17, 2018; 7 years ago
- Discontinued: 25 July 2019; 7 years ago
- Compatible networks: 3G only
- Colors: Black, White and Red
- Operating system: Android 8.1 "Oreo" (Go Edition)
- System-on-chip: MediaTek MT6580
- CPU: Quad-core (4x Cortex-A7 @ 1.3 GHz)
- GPU: Mali-400
- Memory: 1 GB RAM
- Storage: 8 GB ROM
- Removable storage: MicroSDXC Expandable up to 64GB via microSD
- SIM: Dual-SIM slot (nanoSIM)
- Battery: 2400 mAh lithium-ion battery (removable)
- Charging: Standard 10 W Charging
- Rear camera: Single: 13 MP Main Camera, Autofocus & LED Flash
- Front camera: Single: 13 MP Main Camera, Autofocus & LED Flash
- Display: 5.5 in (140 mm) 720x1440 HD+ IPS LCD, (293 ppi) with 18:9 Aspect Ratio
- Connectivity: Wi-Fi 802.11 b/g/n; Wi-Fi Direct; Bluetooth 4.1; BLE; Micro USB 2.0
- Data inputs: A-GPS; Accelerometer; Ambient Light Sensor; Fingerprint Scanner; Proximity Sensor
- Website: cherryshop.com.ph

The Cherry Mobile Flare S7 Prime is a Android-based smartphone manufactured by Cherry Mobile. Unveiled on 17 October 2018 in the Philippines.

== Specifications ==
=== Hardware ===
==== Chipset ====
The Flare S7 Prime is powered by 4x Cortex-A7 @ 1.3 GHz quad-core processors with MediaTek MT6580 SoC. The SoC is based on the 28 nm processing technology node. The smartphone also feature an Mali-400 GPU.

==== Storage ====
The Flare S7 Prime has a dual SIM slot and comes equipped with 8 GB of ROM and 1 GB of RAM and has additional memory via microSD for extra storage up to 32 GB.

==== Camera ====
The Flare S7 Prime has 1 camera, which are a single-camera setup. The rear camera have a 13 MP. The front has a single 13 MP camera.

==== Display ====
The Flare S7 Prime is equipped with an IPS LCD display with a 5.5 inch HD+ 720x1440 resolution and a screen ratio of 18:9.

==== Battery ====
The Flare S7 Prime is equipped with a 2400 mAh Li-on removable battery. This battery only supports 10 W standard charging.

== Software ==
The Flare S7 Prime operates on Android 8.1 Oreo Go Edition, which is a low-end and stock version of Android 8.1.
