= Cherry Mobile Alpha Luxe =

Windows Mobile smartphone manufactured by Cherry Mobile

- Brand: Cherry Mobile
- Type: Smartphone
- Series: Alpha series
- First released: September 9, 2014
- Related: Cherry Mobile Alpha Style
- Compatible networks: 2G EDGE, GPRS; 3G HSPA+
- Form factor: Slate
- Color: Black
- Dimensions: 145 mm (5.7 in) H 72 mm (2.8 in) W 9 mm (0.35 in) D
- Weight: 160 g (5.6 oz)
- Operating system: Windows Phone 8.1
- System-on-chip: Qualcomm Snapdragon 200
- CPU: 1.2 GHz quad-core
- GPU: Adreno 305
- Memory: 1 GB RAM
- Storage: 8 GB
- Removable storage: MicroSD up to 32 GB
- SIM: Dual SIM
- Battery: 2,000 mAh Li-ion
- Charging: MicroUSB
- Rear camera: 8.0 MP autofocus with LED flash
- Front camera: 2.0 MP
- Display: 5.0 in (130 mm) HD IPS display, 1280 × 720 pixels (294 ppi), Dragontrail glass

The Cherry Mobile Alpha Luxe is a Windows Mobile 8.1-based smartphone developed and manufactured by Cherry Mobile. Unveiled on September 9, 2014 at Sofitel Manila, it features a 5-inch IPS display and the frst Windows Mobile phone manufactured.

== Specifications ==
=== Display ===
The Alpha Luxe features a 5.0-inch HD IPS display with a resolution of 720 × 1280 pixels, resulting in a pixel density of approximately 294 ppi. The screen is protected by scratch-resistant Asahi DragonTrail glass.

=== Hardware ===
The device features a gloss frame with a finish similar to the Nexus 4 and a few from the Samsung Galaxy S4.

It is powered by a 1.2GHz quad-core Qualcomm Snapdragon 200 processor, paired with an Adreno 305 GPU and 1 GB of RAM. The smartphone includes 8 GB of internal storage, which can be expanded by up to 32 GB via a dedicated MicroSD card slot.

=== Battery ===
The device runs on a 2,000 mAh lithium-ion battery. The phone's smaller capacity is capable of lasting more than 18 hours of moderate usage on a single charge.

=== Camera ===
The Alpha Luxe is equipped with two cameras: an 8.0-megapixel autofocus rear camera with an LED flash, and a 2.0-megapixel front-facing camera. The main camera's software allows users to configure scene settings manually or adjust the ISO.

=== Software ===
The smartphone ships with Windows Phone 8.1 out of the box with the "Omega" icon. The software features fluid system animations and includes critical operating system fixes, such as an updated Storage Sense application that instantly reflects freed space when files or apps are deleted from the device or an inserted SD card. The device had full access to the Windows Phone Store, supporting third-party applications and 3D games like Asphalt 8 and Star Wars: Commander.
