= Cherry OS (operating system) =

Android-based mobile User interface developed by Cherry Mobile

- Screenshot of the Cherry OS 2.0 home screen on a Flare S8
- Developer: Cherry Mobile
- Written in: C
- OS family: Android
- Working state: Discontinued
- Source model: Closed-source
- Initial release: 1.0 (Based on Android 7.0) / 2017; 9 years ago
- Latest release: 2.0 (Based on Android 9) / 2019; 7 years ago
- Official website: www.cherryshop.com.ph

Cherry OS is a discontinued Android-based operating system developed by Cherry Mobile, a leading mobile phone manufacturer in the Philippines. It was introduced in October 2017.

== History ==
=== Version history ===
| Version | Initial release | Android OS | Smartphones | References |
|---|---|---|---|---|
| 1.0 | 2017 | 7.0 "Nougat" | Flare S6 Series (Flare S6, Flare S6 Deluxe, Flare S6 Plus) | |
| 2.0 | 2019 | 9.0 "Pie" | Flare S8 Series (Flare S8, S8 Lite, S8 Deluxe, S8 Prime, S8 Max, S8 Plus, S8 Pro) | |

==== Cherry OS 1.0 ====
Screenshot of Cherry OS 1.0 home screen on a Flare S6

Cherry OS 1.0, based on Android 7.0, includes a suite of features aimed at improving both security and usability. The 360 Security app gives antivirus protection as well as the tools for Boost and Clean, optimizing device performance through memory management and battery consumption. For privacy, Cherry OS features a password-protected system that allows users to protect private messages, media, and apps; access to storage is through a passcode accessed through the dialer app. Avatar Mode allows users to log into multiple social media accounts on a single device, keeping personal and work accounts separate.

==== Cherry OS 2.0 ====
Cherry OS 2.0, based on Android 9, comes with several additional features and applications, including Game Booster, which optimizes the device's performance for gaming. Hi Weather provides weather forecasts and related information. Property System replaces 360 Security and performs security checks. Power Manager manages power consumption and battery usage.

== Development and launch ==
Cherry Mobile announced Cherry OS in October 2017, along with the launch of the Flare S6 series. This was a custom UI that was implemented into the Flare S6 phones, aiming to give users more secure and stable performance.

In July 2019, Cherry Mobile released the Flare S8 series, which came equipped with Cherry OS V2.0, which was based on Android 9. This new version continued to expand on the features of the original Cherry OS.

== Discontinuation ==
After the Flare S8 series, Cherry Mobile stopped the further development of the Cherry OS platform. Before its release of the Flare S8 series, Cherry Mobile skipped the Flare S7 series and ran on near-stock Android 8.1 Oreo without adding any heavy theme or additional functionality. Cherry Mobile has not announced anything or continued with developing or even pushing Cherry OS onto future devices.
