= THL =

THL may refer to:

== Academia ==
- Tibetan and Himalayan Library, published by the University of Virginia
- Licentiate of Theology (Th.L.), degree

== Businesses and organisations ==
- Finnish Institute for Health and Welfare (THL, Finnish: Terveyden ja hyvinvoinnin laitos)
- THL Partners, a private equity firm
- Tourism Holdings Limited, a New Zealand tourism company
- Technology Happy Life, a Chinese smartphone manufacturer
- Tropical Hockey League, a Miami-based hockey league of the late 1930s

== Language ==
- THL Simplified Phonetic Transcription of Standard Tibetan
- ISO 639-3 language code for the Dangaura varieties of the Tharu languages

== Transport ==
- IATA airport code for Tachilek Airport
- Tile Hill railway station, West Midlands, England, station code

== Music ==
- The Human League, an English synth-pop band formed in Sheffield in 1977

== Other uses ==
- Tinfoil Hat Linux distribution
