= MyPhone Agua Rain 2G =

Android smartphone from MyPhone

- Brand: MyPhone
- Type: Smartphone
- Series: Agua
- First released: October 8, 2013
- Compatible networks: 2G (GPRS, EDGE)
- Form factor: Slate
- Operating system: Android 4.2.2 (Jelly Bean)
- System-on-chip: MediaTek MT6572M
- CPU: 1.0 GHz dual-core
- GPU: Mali-400
- Memory: 256 MB RAM
- Storage: 512 MB
- Removable storage: microSD (up to 32 GB)
- SIM: Dual SIM
- Battery: Removable Li-Ion 1300 mAh
- Rear camera: 1.3 MP
- Front camera: None
- Display: 3.5 in (89 mm) HVGA (320×480 pixels), capacitive touchscreen, ~170 ppi
- Model: Rain 2G

The MyPhone Agua Rain 2G is an entry-level Android smartphone released in October 2013 by the Philippine tech brand MyPhone.

== Specifications ==
=== Hardware ===
The device is powered by a 1.0 GHz dual-core MediaTek MT6572M processor paired with a Mali-400 GPU. It features a 3.5-inch capacitive touchscreen display with an HVGA resolution of 320×480 pixels, yielding a pixel density of approximately 170 ppi.

Memory specifications include 256 MB of RAM and 512 MB of built-in storage, which can be expanded up to 32 GB via a dedicated microSD card slot.

The smartphone is powered by a 1,300 mAh lithium-ion battery.

=== Camera ===
The MyPhone Agua Rain 2G includes a single 1.3-megapixel primary camera positioned on the back of the device. This rear camera does not support autofocus and lacks an LED flash. The phone does not feature a front-facing camera.

=== Software ===
The phone runs on the Android 4.2.2 Jelly Bean operating system out of the box. It comes with several pre-installed applications, including Facebook, Twitter, Viber, and MyLoad. Users can access additional software and games through the Google Play Store.
