= Richie de Quina =

Filipino business executive (born 1980)

Vice President, MyPhone
- Incumbent
- Assumed office May 26, 1993 - present

Personal details
- Born: Richard S. de Quina; October 20, 1980 (age 45)
- Occupation: Vice President for Marketing, MyPhone; Businessman

Richard de Quina (born October 20, 1980), popularly known as Richie de Quina, is the Vice President for marketing of MyPhone, the leading local mobile brand in the Philippines. He is also the CEO of the first Korean Ginseng soap in the Philippines, Rejuv Ginseng.

== See also ==
- MyPhone
