= Gtel SL 5.5 =

Mobile phone

GTel SL 5.5
- Brand: GTel Zimbabwe
- Type: Smartphone
- Series: SL
- First released: October 29, 2014; 11 years ago

On 29 October 2014, GTel Zimbabwe launched the slimmest mobile phone handset in Africa and 2nd slimmest in the world in 2014, the Gtel SL 5.5 which is 5.60mm thin.
