= Tenor (disambiguation) =

A tenor (from Latin tenor – holder, or tenere – hold) is a type of classical male singing voice whose vocal range or section is higher than baritone and lower than countertenor. A person, instrument, or group that performs in that range or the tenor clef is also called a tenor.

Tenor may also refer to:

== Finance ==
- Tenor (finance), the duration or time-to-maturity of a bond or swap
- The coupon frequency of an equity swap

== Music ==
- In change ringing, the bell with the lowest pitch
- The reciting tone, also called recitation tone, of a Gregorian chant
- A tenor saxophone
- A tenor drum
- Tenor (album)

== Other uses ==
- Tenor (linguistics), the relationship between participants in a discourse
- A search technology planned for KDE 4
- Tenor (website), a GIF search engine and database
- 10.or, a mobile phone brand
- The Tenor, a retail complex in Toronto, Canada
