= Cherry Mobile Flare S8 =

Android smartphone series from Cherry Mobile

Cherry Mobile Flare S8 Cherry Mobile Flare S8 Lite Cherry Mobile Flare S8 Deluxe Cherry Mobile Flare S8 Pro Cherry Mobile Flare S8 Plus Cherry Mobile Flare S8 Prime Cherry Mobile Flare S8 Max
- Manufacturer: Cherry Mobile
- Type: Smartphone
- Series: Flare
- First released: July 25, 2019; 6 years ago (S8, S8 Pro & S8 Plus); October 3, 2019; 6 years ago (S8 Lite, S8 Deluxe, S8 Prime & S8 Max)
- Discontinued: Yes
- Predecessor: Cherry Mobile Flare S7
- Successor: Cherry Mobile Aqua S9
- Form factor: Slate
- Operating system: Cherry OS V2.0 (based on Android 9)
- System-on-chip: S8/S8 Lite/S8 Prime/S8 Max: Mediatek Helio P23; S8 Pro: Mediatek Helio P22; S8 Deluxe: UNISOC SC9863A; S8 Plus: Mediatek Helio P70
- CPU: Mediatek Helio P23: Octa-core (4x Cortex-A53 @ 2.3GHz & 4x Cortex-A53 @ 1.65GHz); Mediatek Helio P22: Octa-core (4x2.0 GHz Cortex-A53 & 4x1.5 GHz Cortex-A53); UNISOC SC9863A: Octa-core (4x Cortex-A55 @ 1.6GHz); Mediatek Helio P70: Octa-core (4x Cortex-A73 @ 2.1GHz & 4x Cortex-A53 @ 2.0GHz)
- GPU: Mediatek Helio P23: Mali G71-MP2; UNISOC SC9863A: PowerVR GE8322; Mediatek Helio P22: PowerVR GE8320; Mediatek Helio P70: Mali G72-MP3
- Memory: S8: 3GB; S8 Lite: 2GB; S8 Deluxe/S8 Pro/S8 Prime/S8 Max: 4GB; S8 Plus: 6GB
- Storage: S8: 32GB; S8 Lite: 16GB; S8 Deluxe/S8 Pro/S8 Prime/S8 Max: 64GB; S8 Plus: 128GB
- Removable storage: MicroSDXC expandable up to 128GB (S8, S8 Lite, S8 Deluxe & S8 Max); MicroSDXC expandable up to 256GB (S8 Prime); MicroSDXC expandable up to 512GB (S8 Pro & S8 Plus)
- SIM: Dual-SIM Slot or Hybrid (nanoSIM)
- Battery: S8: 2800mAh; S8 Lite: 2500mAh (removable); S8 Deluxe: 3000 mAh; S8 Pro: 4000 mAh; S8 Plus: 3250 mAh; S8 Prime: 3300 mAh; S8 Max: 6000 mAh
- Rear camera: S8: Dual: 13MP Main Camera (f/2.0 Aperture, Autofocus) + 2MP Depth Sensor; S8 Lite: Dual: 8MP Main Camera + 2MP Depth Camera; S8 Deluxe: Dual: 16MP Main Camera + 2MP Depth Sensor; S8 Pro: Dual: 20MP Main Camera (f/2.0 Aperture, Autofocus) + 5MP Depth Sensor; S8 Plus: Triple: 16MP Main Camera (f/1.6 Aperture, PDAF) + 5MP Secondary Camera + 2MP Depth Sensor; S8 Prime: Dual: 16MP Main Camera (Sony IMX298) + 5MP Depth Camera (Galaxy Core GC2385); S8 Max: Dual: 16MP Main Camera (PDAF) + 2MP Depth Camera
- Front camera: S8: 13MP front camera, f/2.0, 1080p video S8 Lite: 5MP front camera S8 Deluxe: 8MP front camera S8 Pro: 20 MP front camera S8 Plus: Dual: 13MP front camera + 2 MP Depth Sensor (motorized pop-up camera); S8 Prime: 16MP motorized pop-up front camera S8 Max: 13MP front camera
- Display: S8: 6.26 in (159 mm) 720x1520 IPS LCD, (269 ppi); S8 Lite: 5.71 in (145 mm) 720x1520 IPS LCD, (295 ppi); S8 Deluxe: 6.26 in (159 mm) 720x1520 IPS LCD, (269 ppi); S8 Pro: 6.5 in (170 mm) 720x1520 IPS LCD, (259 ppi); S8 Plus: 6.26 in (159 mm) 1080x2280 IPS LCD, (403 ppi); S8 Prime: 6.53 in (166 mm) 1080x2340 IPS LCD, (395 ppi); S8 Max: 7.0 in (180 mm) 1080x2160 IPS LCD, (345 ppi)
- Connectivity: Wi-Fi, 802.11 b/g/n with Wi-Fi Direct support, BT4.2, BLE, Micro USB 2.0 (S8, S8 Lite, S8 Deluxe & S8 Max), USB-C (S8 Pro, S8 Plus & S8 Prime)
- Data inputs: GPS; Accelerometer; Fingerprint Scanner; Compass; Proximity Sensor
- Website: https://www.cherrymobile.com/flare-s8-series/flare-s8/ at the Wayback Machine (archived November 13, 2020)

The Cherry Mobile Flare S8 is a series of Android-based smartphones manufactured by Cherry Mobile. Unveiled on 25 July 2019 in the Philippines, They succeeded the Cherry Mobile Flare S7 in the company's Flare line.

== Specifications ==
=== Hardware ===
==== Chipsets (SoC) ====
The Flare S8 lineup includes seven models with various hardware specifications. The S8, S8 Lite, S8 Prime, and S8 Max utilize the Mediatek Helio P23 SoC, while the S8 Pro utilizes the Mediatek Helio P22 SoC, while the S8 Deluxe utilizes the UNISOC SC9863A, and the S8 Plus utilizes the Mediatek Helio P70 SoC.

Model	Chipset (SoC)
S8	Mediatek Helio P23
S8 Lite	Mediatek Helio P23
S8 Prime	Mediatek Helio P23
S8 Max	Mediatek Helio P23
S8 Deluxe	UNISOC SC9863A
S8 Pro	Mediatek Helio P22
S8 Plus	Mediatek Helio P70

==== Display ====
The S8 and S8 Deluxe feature a 6.26-inch (159 mm) screen with 720 by 1520 pixels of resolution and a tiny teardrop notch, while the S8 Lite features a 5.7-inch (149 mm) screen with 720 by 1520 pixels of resolution and a tiny teardrop notch, while the S8 Pro features a 6.5-inch (170 mm) screen with the same display resolution as the S8.

The S8 Plus features 6.26-inch (159mm) with 1080 by 2280 pixels of resolution and uses full-view display, While the S8 Prime 6.53-inch (166mm) with 1080 by 2340 pixels of resolution and uses full-view display, While the S8 Max features 7.0-inch (180mm) with and uses tiny teardrop notch.

Model	Display size (in)	Display resolution	Pixels per inch (ppi)	Display type
S8	6.26	720x1520	269ppi	IPS LCD
S8 Deluxe	6.26	720x1520	269ppi	IPS LCD
S8 Lite	5.71	720x1520	295ppi	IPS LCD
S8 Pro	6.5	720x1520	259ppi	IPS LCD
S8 Plus	6.26	1080x2280	403ppi	IPS LCD
S8 Prime	6.53	1080x2340	395ppi	IPS LCD
S8 Max	7.0	1080x2160	345ppi	IPS LCD

==== Storage ====
The S8 offers 3GB of RAM with 32GB of internal storage. The S8 Lite has 2GB of RAM and 16GB of internal storage. The S8 Deluxe, S8 Pro, S8 Prime, and S8 Max offer 4GB of RAM with 64GB of internal storage. The S8 Plus offers 6GB of RAM with 128GB of internal storage.

Model	RAM	Storage
S8	3GB	32GB
S8 Lite	2GB	16GB
S8 Deluxe	4GB	64GB
S8 Pro	4GB	64GB
S8 Plus	4GB	64GB
S8 Prime	4GB	64GB
S8 Max	6GB	128GB

==== Battery ====
The Flare S8 is equipped with a Non-removable 2800 mAh Li-ion battery.

==== Camera ====
The Flare S8 has 2 cameras, which are a dual-camera setup with a 13 MP main camera, and a 2 MP depth sensor for portrait effects.

Camera comparison on Flare S8 Series
Models		Flare S8	Flare S8 Lite	Flare S8 Deluxe	Flare S8 Pro	Flare S8 Plus	Flare S8 Prime	Flare S8 Max
Main	Specs	13MP, f/2.0, w/ PDAF	8MP, f/2.2 w/ AF	16MP, w/ AF, BSI	20MP	16MP, f/1.6	16MP, f/1.8, w/ BSI, PDAF	16MP, f/2.0 w/ BSI, PDAF
Main	Model	Sony IMX258	OV8865	OV16880P	Sony IMX350	Samsung ISOCELL S5K2P7	Sony IMX298	OV16880
Ultrawide	Specs	-						
Ultrawide	Model	-						
Monochrome	Specs	-				5MP	-	
Monochrome	Model	-				OV5670	-	
Depth	Specs	2MP	2MP	2MP	5MP	2MP (rear), 5MP (front)	5MP depth	2MP
Depth	Model	-	SP0A08	-	H1259	-		
Front	Specs	13MP	5MP	8MP, w/ BSI	20MP	16MP f/1.8	16MP, f/1.8, w/ BSI	13MP, f/2.0, w/ BSI
Front	Model	Sony IMX258	GC5035	GC8034	Sony IMX376	Samsung S5K3P3	Samsung S5K3P3	Sony IMX258

== Software ==
The Flare S8 series is equipped with Cherry OS V2.0 which based on the Android 9 operating system.
