= MyPhone Cyclone =

Android smartphone from MyPhone

MyPhone Agua Cyclone
- Brand: MyPhone
- Type: Smartphone
- Series: Agua Series
- First released: December 2013
- Compatible networks: 2G, 3G (HSPA+)
- Form factor: Slate
- Operating system: Android 4.2 (Jelly Bean)
- System-on-chip: MediaTek MT6582M
- CPU: 1.3 GHz quad-core ARM Cortex-A7
- GPU: Mali-400
- Memory: 1 GB RAM
- Storage: 4 GB
- Removable storage: microSD, up to 32 GB
- SIM: Dual SIM
- Battery: 2,000 mAh
- Rear camera: 8 MP, autofocus, LED flash
- Front camera: 2 MP
- Display: 5.0 in (130 mm) qHD (960×540 pixels) IPS LCD

The MyPhone Agua Cyclone is a mid-range Android smartphone released by Filipino mobile brand MyPhone in December 2013.

== Specifications ==
=== Hardware ===
The MyPhone Agua Cyclone features a 5-inch qHD IPS capacitive touchscreen display with a resolution of 960 × 540 pixels. It is powered by a 1.3 GHz quad-core MediaTek MT6582 processor paired with a Mali-400 graphics processing unit.

The device includes 1 GB of RAM and 4 GB of internal storage, which can be expanded up to 32 GB using a microSD card. It also provides dual-SIM connectivity and supports USB On-The-Go functionality.

=== Battery ===
The device is equipped with a removable 2,000 mAh lithium-ion battery.

=== Camera ===
The smartphone includes an 8-megapixel primary rear camera featuring autofocus and an LED flash for low-light photography and the front of the device is fitted with a 2-megapixel camera sensor.

=== Software ===
The Agua Cyclone runs on the Android 4.2.2 Jelly Bean operating system out of the box. It features MyPhone's customized software suite, which incorporates specialized local applications such as the proprietary TARA (Theft App Arrest) anti-theft security system.
