= Cherry Mobile Flare =

Series of Android smartphones

Flare
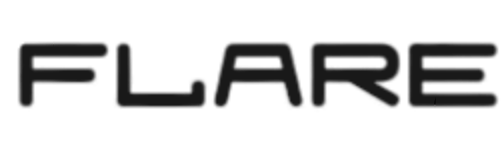
- Developer: Cherry Mobile
- Manufacturer: Cherry Mobile
- Type: Smartphone
- Released: 2012
- Operating system: Android
- Related: List of Cherry Mobile products
- Website: http://cherrymobile.com.ph/flare-series

Cherry Mobile Flare (or simply Flare) is a series of Android-powered smartphones designed, manufactured and marketed by Cherry Mobile.

== Model comparison ==
| Name | Operating system | SIM | Display | Weight | Battery | Keyboard | Web | Camera, (MPx) | Network | SRP | Image |
|---|---|---|---|---|---|---|---|---|---|---|---|
| Flare | Android 4.0 Ice Cream Sandwich; Qualcomm Snapdragon S4 MSM8625 1.2 GHz dual-core processor 4 GB ROM 512 MB RAM; Micro SD up to 64 GB | Two | 4" WVGA capacitive | | 1500 mAh | Touchscreen | GPRS, MMS, Wi-Fi, 3G/HSDPA; AGPS-enabled | 5.0 back, VGA front | GSM 850/900/1900/2100 MHz; UMTS 900/1900/2100 MHz | PHP 4,000 | |
| Flare 2.0 | Android 4.1.2 Jellybean; Qualcomm 8225Q 1.2 GHz quad-core CPU; 4 GB ROM 512 MB RAM | Two | 4" WVGA capacitive | | 1550 mAh | Touchscreen | GPRS, MMS, Wi-Fi, 3G/HSDPA; AGPS-enabled | 5.0 back, VGA front | GSM 850/900/1900/2100 MHz; UMTS 900/1900/2100 MHz | PHP 3,990 | |
| Flare 3 | Android 4.4 "Kitkat"; 1.3 quad-core processor; 8 GB + 1 GB memory | Dual Sim | 5.0" IPS OGS qHD | | 2000 mAh | Touchscreen | GPRS, MMS, Wi-Fi, 3G/HSDPA; AGPS-enabled | 8.0 rear, 3.0 front | GSM 850/900/1800/1900 MHz WCDMA 2100 MHz 2G EDGE GPRS 3G 325 kbit/s HSPA 21 Mbit/s HSPA+ 42 Mbit/s | PHP 3,999 | |
| Flare Lite Quad | Android 4.4.2 "Kitkat"; 1.2 GHz quad-core processor; 4 GB ROM | Dual Sim | 4.0" G+F capacitive | | 2500 mAh | Touchscreen | GPRS, MMS, Wi-Fi, 3G/HSDPA; AGPS-enabled | 5.0 rear, 2.0 front | GSM 850/900/1800/1900 MHz WCDMA 2100 MHz 2G EDGE GPRS 3G 325 kbit/s HSPA 21 Mbit/s HSPA+ 42 Mbit/s | PHP 2,499 | |
| Flare Dash | Android 4.3" "Jellybean"; 1.2 quad-core processor; 4 GB ROM; 1 GB RAM | Dual Sim | 4.0" capacitive | | 2000 mAh | Touchscreen | GPRS, MMS, Wi-Fi, 3G/HSDPA; AGPS-enabled | 5.0 rear, VGA front | GSM 850/900/1800/1900 MHz WCDMA 2100 MHz 2G EDGE GPRS 3G 325 kbit/s HSPA 21 Mbit/s HSPA+ 42 Mbit/s | PHP 3,299 | |
| Flare S | Android 4.2 Jelly Bean; Mediatek MT6582M 1.3 GHz Quad core processor 4 GB ROM 1 GB RAM | Two | 4.0" IPS 1280x720 5 Point Capacitive Multi-Touch Screen | | 1400 mAh | Touchscreen | GPRS, MMS, WiFi, 3G/HSPA+ AGPS-enabled | 8.0 back, 0.3 MP front | GSM 850/900/1800/1900 MHz; UMTS 850/2100 MHz | PHP 4, 490 | |
| Flare S2 | Android 4.2 "Jellybean"; 1.3 GHz quad-core processor; 4 GB ROM; 1 GB RAM | Dual Sim | 4.5" FWVGA IPS | | 1900 mAh | Touchscreen | GPRS, MMS, Wi-Fi, 3G/HSDPA; AGPS-enabled | 8.0 rear, 2.0 front | GSM 850/900/1800/1900 MHz WCDMA 2100 MHz 2G EDGE GPRS 3G 325 kbit/s HSPA 21 Mbit/s HSPA+ 42 Mbit/s | PHP 3,699 | |
| Flare S3 | Android 4.4 "Kitkat"; 1.3 GHz quad-core processor; 8 GB ROM; 1 GB RAM; Micro SD up to 64 GB | Dual Sim | 5.0" IPS OGS qHD | | 2500 mAh | Touchscreen | GPRS, MMS, Wi-Fi, 3G/HSDPA+ AGPS-enabled | 13.0 rear, 5.0 front | GSM 850/900/1800/1900 MHz WCDMA 2100 MHz 2G EDGE GPRS 3G 325 kbit/s HSPA+ 21 Mbit/s HSPA+ 42 Mbit/s | PHP 3,999 | |
| Flare S3 Mini | Android 4.4 "Kitkat"; 1.3 GHz quad-core processor; 4 GB ROM; 1 GB RAM; Micro SD up to 64 GB | Dual Sim | 4.0" capacitive | | 2500 mAh | Touchscreen | GPRS, MMS, Wi-Fi, 3G/HSDPA; AGPS-enabled | 8.0 rear, 2.0 front | GSM 850/900/1800/1900 MHz WCDMA 2100 MHz 2G EDGE GPRS 3G 325 kbit/s HSPA 21 Mbit/s HSPA+ 42 Mbit/s | PHP 2,999 | |
| Flare S3 Lite | Android 4.4.2 "Kitkat"; 1.2 GHz quad-core processor; 4 GB ROM, 1 GB RAM; Micro SD up to 64 GB | Dual Sim | 5.0" IPS | | 2500 mAh | Touchscreen | GPRS, MMS, Wi-Fi, 3G/HSDPA; AGPS-enabled | 8.0 rear, 5.0 front | GSM 850/900/1800/1900 MHz WCDMA 2100 MHz 2G EDGE GPRS 3G 325 kbit/s HSPA 21 Mbit/s HSPA+ 42 Mbit/s | PHP 2,999 | |
| Flare S3 Octa | Android 4.4.2 "Kitkat"; 1.4 GHz octa-core processor; 8 GB ROM; 1 GB RAM; Micro SD up to 64 GB | Dual Sim | 5.0" HD | | 2500 mAh | Touchscreen | GPRS, MMS, Wi-Fi, 3G/HSDPA; AGPS-enabled | 13.0 rear, 5.0 front | GSM 850/900/1800/1900 MHz WCDMA 2100 MHz 2G EDGE GPRS 3G 325 kbit/s HSPA 21 Mbit/s HSPA+ 42 Mbit/s | PHP 4,499 | |
| Flare S3 Power | Android 4.4 "Kitkat"; 1.4 GHz octa-core processor; 8 GB ROM; 3 GB RAM | Dual Sim | 5.5" IPS OGS | | 4000 mAh | Touchscreen | GPRS, MMS, Wi-Fi, 3G/HSDPA+ AGPS-enabled | 13.0 rear, 5.0 front | GSM 850/900/1800/1900 MHz WCDMA 2100 MHz 2G EDGE GPRS 3G 325 kbit/s HSPA 21 Mbit/s HSPA+ 42 Mbit/s | PHP 4,999 | |
| Flare XL | Android 4.4.4 "Kitkat"; 1.4 GHz octa-core processor; 8 GB ROM; 1 GB RAM | Dual Sim | 5.5" IPS OGS | | 4000 mAh | Touchscreen | GPRS, MMS, Wi-Fi, 3G/HSDPA+ AGPS-enabled | 13.0 rear, 5.0 front | GSM 850/900/1800/1900 MHz WCDMA 2100 MHz 2G EDGE GPRS 3G 325 kbit/s HSPA 21 Mbit/s HSPA+ 42 Mbit/s | PHP 4,999 | |
| Flare X | Android 4.4.4 "Kitkat"; 1.7 GHz octa-core processor; 16 GB ROM; 3 GB RAM | Dual Sim | 6.5" IPS OGS | | 4000 mAh | Touchscreen | GPRS, MMS, Wi-Fi, LTE, 3G/HSDPA+ AGPS-enabled | 13.0 rear, 5.0 front | GSM 850/900/1800/1900 MHz WCDMA 2100 MHz 2G EDGE GPRS 3G 325 kbit/s HSPA 21 Mbit/s HSPA+ 42 Mbit/s LTE 850/1800/2100/2600 MHz | PHP 6,999 | |
| Flare S8 | Android 9.0 Pie with Cherry OS v2; MediaTek Helio P23 (MT6763T); 2.3 GHz 4 × Cortex-A53 + 1.65 GHz 4 × Cortex-A53; 32 GB ROM; 3 GB RAM | Dual SIM (Nano SIM) | 6.26" HD+ IPS LCD | 155 mm × 77 mm × 9 mm | 2800 mAh Li-ion (Non-removable) | Touchscreen | GPRS, 2G EDGE, 3G HSPA+, 4G LTE, Wi-Fi | 13 MP rear (f/2.0 Aperture, Autofocus), 13 MP front | GSM 900/1800 MHz UMTS 850/900/2100 MHz LTE 850/1800/2100 MHz | PHP 3,999 | |
