= Verykool =

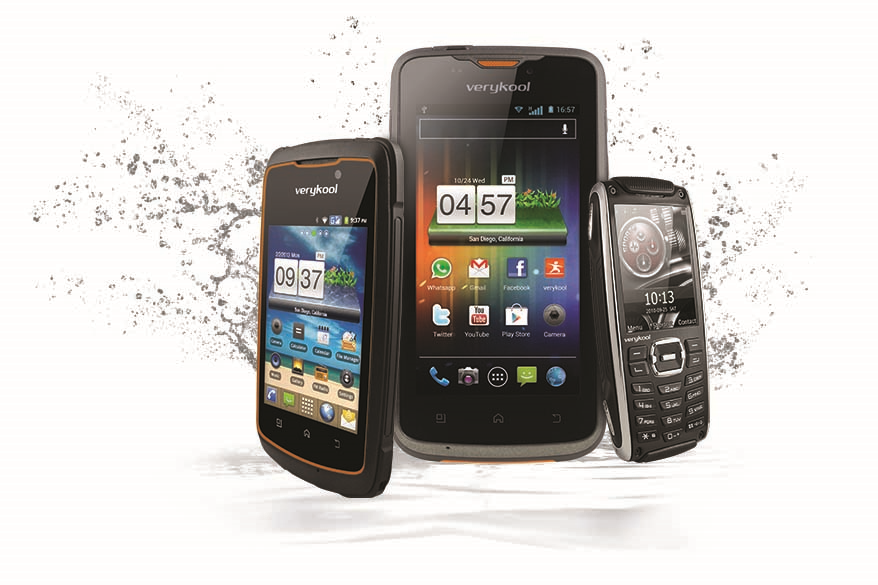
The verykool xTreme RS79, RS90, and R80 (from left to right) from InfoSonics Corporation.

Verykool (styled as verykool) was a series of mobile phones, tablets and accessories by Hipercell USA LLC, a company with headquarters in Miami, FL. The line was launched in 2006 by Infosonics Inc. and includes accessories, cell phones, tablets and smartphones. The verykool product line is sold in over 20 countries. It is marketed under the verykool brand name in the United States, Latin America, and the Caribbean where they are shipped to network operators, retailers and distributors. verykool is known for its line of inexpensive unlocked phones with dual sim card options as well as its rugged line of phones.

== History ==
The verykool line was launched in 2006 by InfoSonics Corporation, a publicly traded company that operated as a telecommunication product distributor since 1994. The company was a distributor of products supplied by Samsung, VK Corporation, LG, Novatel and others. InfoSonics Corporation ceased its distribution business in 2012 and became solely a manufacturer of its own product line. InfoSonics began shipping its first line of verykool products to Central America in 2007. This included the verykool i500 and i230 wireless handsets.

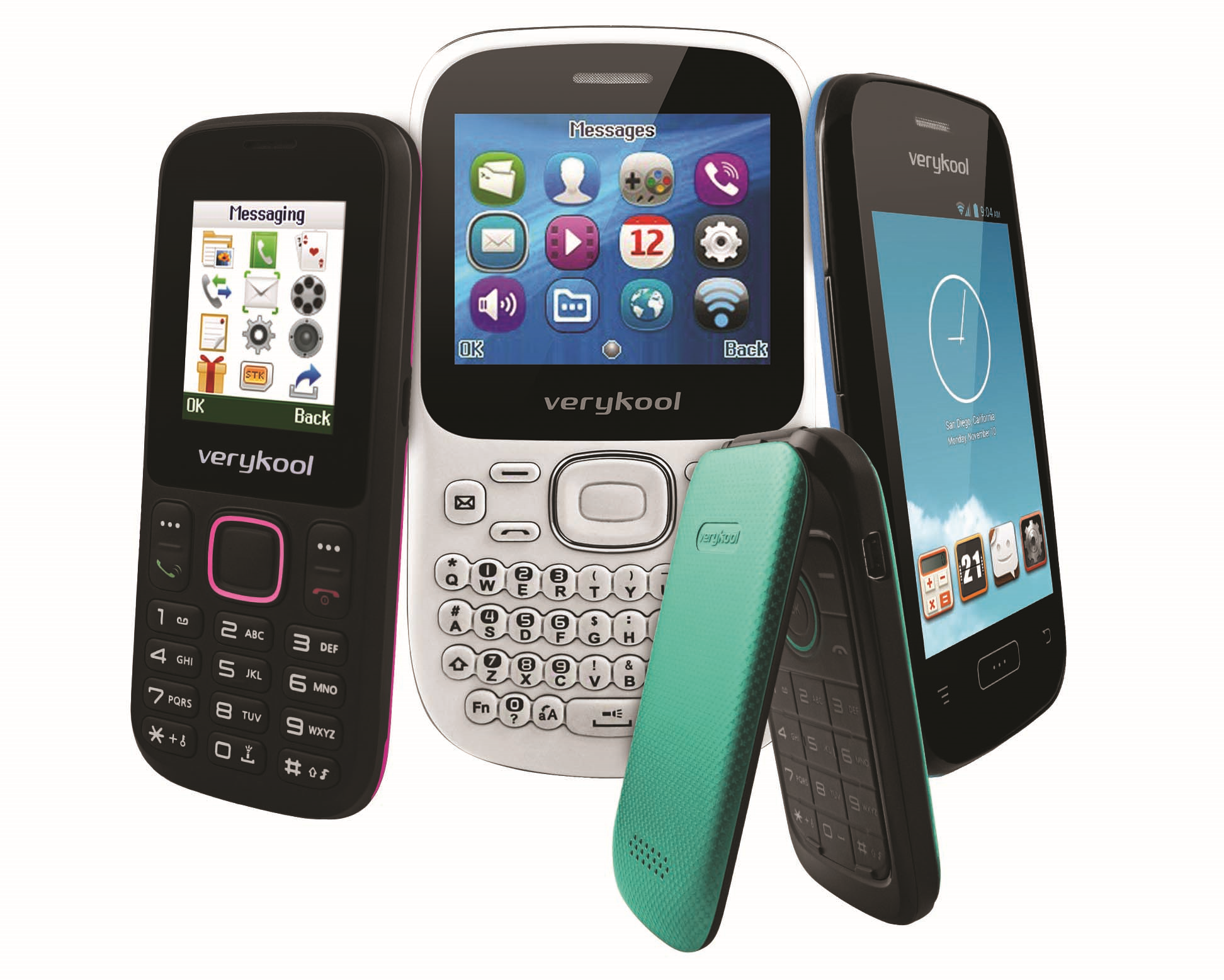
The verykool i126, i607, i316, and i235 from InfoSonics Corporation.

The verykool product line was expanded in 2013 with the release of the verykool s350 and the verykool RS75. The RS75 is part of the verykool rugged line of mobile phones. It is a dust and waterproof phone with an Ingress Protection rating of IP67 and tempered, scratch-resistant glass display. InfoSonics also began marketing its mobile devices in the United States in 2013 due to the demand of inexpensive unlocked phones. That same year InfoSonics released the verykool s470, also called the Black Pearl. The Black Pearl is comparable to the Moto X from Motorola Mobility with a 1.2 GHz processor and 4.7-inch screen. It also includes Dual SIM technology allowing users to switch between two SIM cards within the phone. It is compatible with GSM carriers like AT&T, T-Mobile and overseas GSM networks, and was called an alternative to the Nexus 5 by Mobile Tech Reviews.

verykool products entered the tablet market in 2012 with the release of the verykool R800, a tablet that was marketed to outdoor users. The tablet was integrated with Wi-Fi, 3G connectivity, e-compass, and GPS. It also had mobile call capability when using a 3G network and with its IPX5 rating was considered waterproof. 2014 saw the release of the verykool KolorPad (T742), an entry-level tablet. The KolorPad runs off Android Jelly Bean 4.2 and has a 7-inch screen with a 2,500mAh battery. It is Wi-Fi equipped and also runs off 3G where available.

During the last quarter of 2018, Hipercell USA LLC acquired all verykool intellectual property rights from Cool Holdings, Inc. after closing an agreement to transfer the verykool trademark and related intellectual property assets (Infosonics Inc. changed its name to Cool Holdings, Inc effective on June 8, 2018 ). As the current trademark owner, Hipercell USA LLC, plans to launch a new line of verykool smartphones soon to be unveiled.

== Product releases ==
C = Current D = Defunct or no longer available P = In production

Phone model	Released	Operating System	Type	Status	Notes
s6001 (Cyprus)	2015	Android 4.4 KitKat	Smartphone	D	Referred to as CYPRUS s6001
s5015 (Spark)	2015	Android 4.4 KitKat	Smartphone	D	Referred to as s5015 Spark II
s5510 (Juno) / s5511 (Juno Quatro)	2014	Android 4.4 KitKat	Phablet	D	Referred to as the Juno (s5510) and the Juno Quatro (s5511)
sl5000 Quantum	2014	Android 4.4 KitKat	Smartphone	D	Expansive 4G LTE support with 1.2 GHz quad-core
s5510 Juno	2014	Android 4.4 KitKat	Smartphone	D	Also offered in a s5511 model (Juno Quatro)
s505	2014	Android 4.2 Jellybean	Smartphone	D	Android smartphone. Also called the "Spark."
s450	2014	Android 4.2 Jellybean	Smartphone	D	Available with single SIM or unlocked dual SIM
