= Cherry Mobile Flare S7 =

Android-based smartphone from Cherry Mobile

- Brand: Cherry Mobile
- Manufacturer: Cherry Mobile
- Type: Smartphone
- Series: Flare S series
- First released: October 12, 2018; 7 years ago
- Discontinued: July 25, 2019; 7 years ago
- Predecessor: Cherry Mobile Flare S6
- Successor: Cherry Mobile Flare S8
- Form factor: Slate
- Colors: Black, Gold, Red, White
- Dimensions: 150.3 mm (5.92 in) H 72 mm (2.8 in) W 9.2 mm (0.36 in) D
- Weight: 185 g (6.5 oz)
- Operating system: Android 8.1 "Oreo"
- System-on-chip: MediaTek MT6739WA
- CPU: Quad Core (4x Cortex-A53 @ 1.3GHz)
- GPU: PowerVR GE8100
- Memory: 2GB LPDDR4X RAM or 3GB LPDDR4X RAM
- Storage: 16GB
- Removable storage: MicroSDXC Expandable up to 128GB
- SIM: Dual-SIM Slot (nanoSIM)
- Battery: 2400 mAh Li-ion Battery (Removable)
- Charging: Standard 10W Charging
- Rear camera: Dual: 13MP Main Camera (f/2.2) + 2MP Depth Sensor, Autofocus and LED Flash
- Front camera: Dual: 13MP Main Camera (f/2.2) + 2MP Depth Sensor, Soft LED Flash
- Display: 5.5 in (140 mm) 720x1440 IPS LCD, (293 ppi) with 18:9 Aspect Ratio
- Connectivity: Wi-Fi 802.11 b/g/n; Wi-Fi Direct; Bluetooth 4.2; BLE; USB-C Port
- Data inputs: A-GPS; Accelerometer; Fingerprint Scanner; Proximity Sensor
- Website: cherryshop.com.ph/products/cherry-mobile-flare-s7-3gb

The Cherry Mobile Flare S7 is a Android-based smartphone manufactured by Cherry Mobile. Unveiled on 12 October 2018 in the Philippines, They succeed the Cherry Mobile Flare S6 in the company's Flare line.

== Specifications ==
=== Hardware ===
==== Chipset (SoC) ====
The Flare S7 is powered by 4x Cortex-A53 @ 1.3GHz quad-core processors with Mediatek MT6739WA SoC. The SoC is based on the 28nm processing technology node. The smartphone also feature an PowerVR GE8100 GPU.

==== Storage ====
The Flare S7 has a dual SIM slot and comes equipped with 16 GB of ROM and 2 GB of RAM or 3 GB of RAM and has additional memory via MicroSD for extra storage up to 128 GB.

==== Camera ====
The Flare S7 has 2 cameras, which are a dual-camera setup. The front camera have a 13 MP with an f/2.2 lens and 2 MP depth camera. The rear has a 13 MP camera with an f/2.0 wide-angle lens and 2 MP Depth Sensor.

==== Display ====
The Flare S7 is equipped with an IPS LCD display with an 5.5-inch 720 x 1440 resolution, with a screen ratio of 18:9.

==== Battery ====
The Flare S7 is equipped with a 2400 Li-on mAh removable battery. This battery is only supports with 10W standard charging capability.

== Software ==
The Flare S7 operates on Android 8.1 Oreo, which is a stock version of Android 8.1.
