= Mobicel =

South African consumer electronics company

- Industry: consumer services
- Founded: January 23, 2007; 19 years ago in Midrand, South Africa
- Founder: Ridhwan Khan
- Headquarters: Midrand (City of Johannesburg Metropolitan Municipality), South Africa
- Key people: Ridhwan Khan (CEO)
- Products: Laptops; Mobile phones; Routers; Tablets

Mobicel is a South African based mobile phone manufacturer company that started in 2007, it is headquartered in Midrand

== History ==
In 2007, Khan took a big step and shut down his successful refurbishing business overnight, and used the profit to fund his new venture. He placed the first order for a new phone designed to his own specifications, and launched the Mobicel brand.
