= Oukitel =

Chinese electronics company

Shenzhen Yunji Intelligent Technology Co., Ltd.
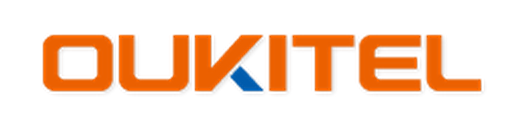
- Native name: 深圳云基智能科技有限公司
- Type: Private
- Industry: Manufacturing
- Founded: 2013 September 13; 13 years ago
- Founder: Sam Zhang
- Headquarters: Shenzhen, China
- Parent: Yunji Group
- Website: oukitel.com

Shenzhen Yunji Intelligent Technology Co., Ltd. (doing business as Oukitel) is a Chinese technology company, headquartered in Longhua, Shenzhen. Oukitel predominantly has a focus on consumer electronics, manufacturing products such as smartphones, tablets and smart watches.

Yunji Intelligent Technology, which is part of Yunji Group, additionally has two divisions, Oukitel New Energy and Oukitel Vape.

== History ==
Yunji Group, Yunji Intelligent Technology's parent company, was established in 2000. On September 13, 2013, Yunji Intelligent Technology was established, and the Oukitel brand was registered.

In 2018, Oukitel Vape was established. The division exports electronic vapes worldwide, and has a reported production capacity of 10 million cigarettes per month. On May 16, 2022, Yunji New Energy Technology was registered. They sell consumer energy products, such as portable generators, batteries and solar panels under the Oukitel brand. The company is also known as Oukitel New Energy.

== Controversy ==
Figures from Tianyancha, a data provider, showed that Oukitel has been involved in multiple legal cases.
