= TeXet =

teXet logo

TeXet is a Russian manufacturer of consumer electronics, based in Saint Petersburg. It is owned by Electronic Systems Alkotel.

== Products ==
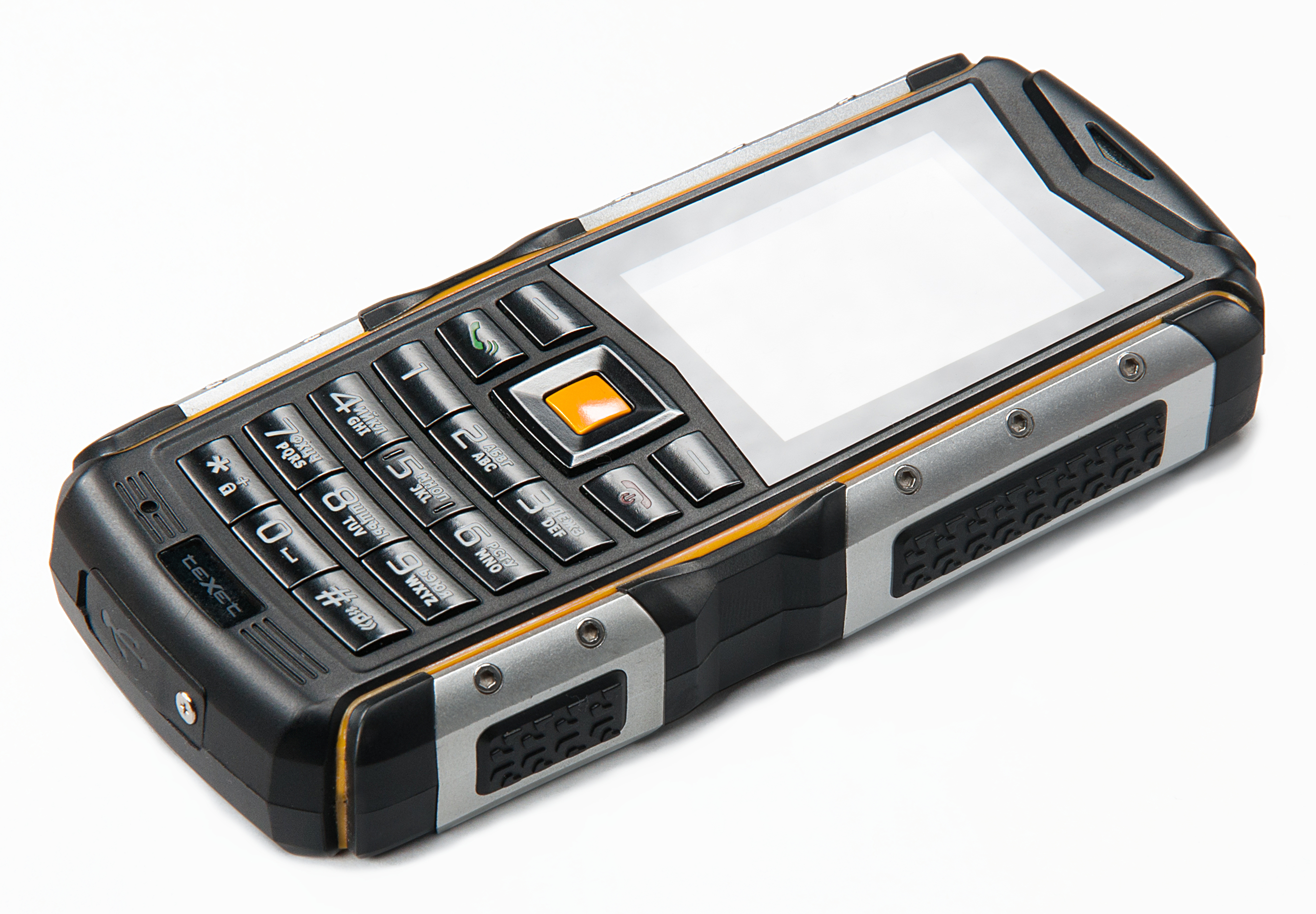
teXet TM-511R mobile phone

The company's flagship phone was the TM-5200, which was installed with the Yandex Opera Mini and Yandex Opera Mobile web browsers.

- X-Watch, a smartwatch (TW-120, TW-200), TW-300)
- Smartphones
  - texet X-basic 2 TM-4272
  - iX-maxi
- Tablet computers
  - TM-7025
  - X-Pad Style 7.1
  - Navipad TM-7049 3G
- Dashcam
  - TeXet DVR-100HD

teXet also manufacturers feature phones, which have fewer features and are considered to meet operational security requirements approved by the General Staff of the Armed Forces of the Russian Federation.
