= Verzo =

Czech cell phone manufacturer

- Company type: Private
- Industry: Electronics; Telecommunications
- Founded: 2010
- Headquarters: Prague, Czech Republic
- Products: Mobile phones
- Website: www.verzo.com

Verzo is a Czech company, established in 2010. The company is engaged in the manufacturing of mobile phones and smartphones.

== Overview ==
Their first model Verzo Kinzo was in design introduced in the second half of August 2011. Unusual appearance of the mobile phone is the work of Czech design studio Novaque belonging to MgA. Petr Novák. Technical parameters were introduced in October 2011. The subsequent sale was launched in the same term throughout Europe and the USA.

Although the design and project plans were created in the Czech Republic, the production of the device is for economic reasons in Taiwan. The company presents themselves to distinguish from their competitors promising exemplary service, customer care and a community of users to which the wishes and requirements should be taken into account in further development.

Verzo Kinzo is the first model in which the brand enters the market, its presentation was held in October 2011. The phone has a 1 GHz processor, 512 MB RAM, 4.3" touchscreen, 5 Mpx camera and works on operating system Android with its own user interface Verzo GUI.
