= IDroid USA =

iDroid USA
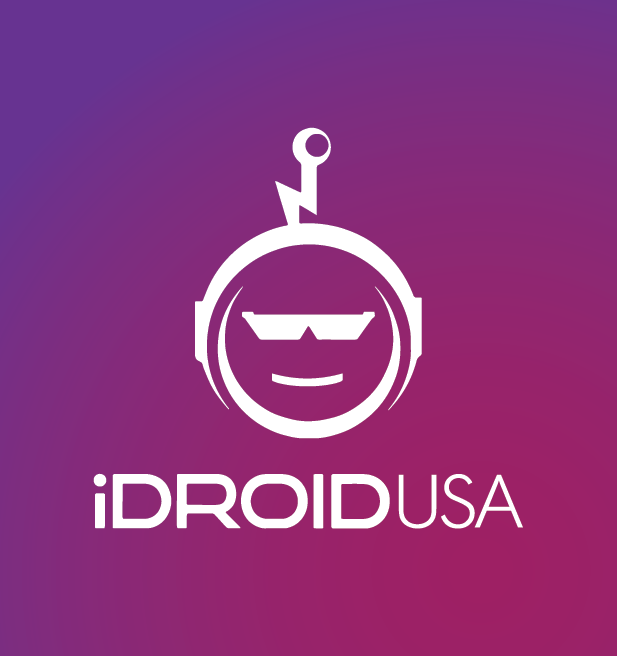
- Industry: Smart Phones & Tablets
- Founded: February 10, 2014; 11 years ago
- Founders: Zubeer Tariq (Co-Founder & CEO); Salman Chaudhry (Co-Founder & CSO); Adeel Naeem (Co-Founder & COO); Jawad Qureshi (Co-Founder & CMO)
- Headquarters: Houston, Texas, U.S.
- Area served: Global
- Products: Cell phones & tablets
- Website: www.idroidusa.com

iDroid USA was founded in 2014 as a smartphone and Tablet PC manufacturer with its main Headquarter in Houston, Texas. iDroid started as an R&D firm with an initial product focus on Android based Tablet PCs and launched their first array of Tablets.

In first quarter of 2014, iDroid launched its first large 5-inch-screen-sized Smartphone under its smart phone line "Tango". In October 2014, iDroid launched its largest Phablet with a 5.5-inch screen and updated Android Kitkat OS with Wake-up Gestures technology.

iDroid uses its own sound enhancing technology called iDro Beast in selected tablets and smart phones. iDROID USA has also recently launched its first Smartwatch and another Smartphone with the most unusual feature of front camera flash which is one of its only kind in the market as yet.

== Global presence 1 ==
iDroid USA has two distribution centers in the United States. One is located in Philadelphia, Pennsylvania, and the other in Houston, Texas.

iDroid officially launched in Europe in Q4 2014. iDroid has sales and marketing offices along with local distribution offices in Benelux and Antwerp.

iDroid launched its operations in Toronto, Ontario, Canada, in September 2014. There are two distribution offices in Canada, one based in Toronto, and the other based in Vancouver, British Columbia.

iDroid USA officially launched in Uganda on 1 January 2015 with a retailer channel signup campaign in Kampala, the Ugandan capital. iDroid also launched their massive TV media campaign and signed up Jose Chameleon as its brand ambassador.

In July 2015, iDroid launches its brand anthem song called iDroid Town produced by local musicians. The song hit the top charts within weeks of release.

In January 2016, iDroid Mobile launched its operations in Kenya. iDroid also launched operations in 2016 in Monterrey Mexico.

iDroid Mobile launched two smart phones Balr X7 and Balr X7 Pro in partnership with Yayvo.com, a Pakistan-based online ecommerce marketplace in March 2017. iDroid Platinum P9, a flagship model was introduced through Daraz.pk in January 2018.

== Device product sheet ==
Finder	iKon Z5	Royal V7	Tango A5	Royal V5	King	Tango2	Royal V4	Balr X7
Dimensions	Height 140.6 mm, width 70.7 mm, thickness 7.9 mm	Height 156 mm, width 76.8 mm, thickness 6.9 mm	Height 146.6 mm, width 73 mm, thickness 7.9 mm	Height 156 mm, width 76.8 mm, thickness 6.9 mm	Height 156 mm, width 76.8 mm, thickness 6.9 mm	141.2 mm × 70.2 mm × 7.9 mm	Height 147.5 mm, width 71.5 mm, thickness 8 mm	Height 153.8 Width 77 Thickness 8.3 mm
Weight	89 g	145 g	130 g	145 g	145 g	115.5 g	148 g	187 g
Display	5-inch IPS OGS screen	5.5-inch QHD IPS OGS multi-touch screen	5-inch OGS IPS multi-touch screen	5-inch QHD OGS IPS Multi-Touch	5.5-inch QHD OGS IPS Multi-Touch	5-inch OGS IPS multi-touch Screen with HD Display	5.0-inch QHD IPS LCD	5-inch TFT – LCD HD
Resolution	480×854	960×540	960×540	960×540	960×540	960×540	960×540	1280×720
Internal storage	8 GB extendable up to 32 GB	8 GB extendable up to 32 GB	8 GB extendable up to 32 GB	8 GB Extendable up to 64 GB	8 GB Extendable up to 64 GB	8 GB Extendable up to 64 GB	8 GB Extendable up to 64 GB	16 GB Extendable up to 64 GB
RAM	1 GB	1 GB	1 GB	1 GB	1 GB	1 GB	1 GB	1 GB
Rear Camera	8.0 MP with Flashlight	13.0 MP with Flashlight	8.0 MP with Flashlight	13.0 MP with LED Flashlight	13.0 MP with Flashlight	8.0 MP with Flashlight	5.0 MP with Flashlight	8.0 MP with Dual LED Flashlight
Battery	1800 mAh	2050 mAh	2200 mAh	2000 mAh	2100 mAh	2200 mAh	2000 mAh	2800 mAh
Processor	1.3 GHz Quad-Core	1.3 GHz Quad-core	1.3 GHz Quad-core	1.3 GHz Quad-core	1.3 GHz Quad-core	1.3 GHz Quad-core	1.3 GHz Quad-core	1.3 GHz Quad-core
OS	Android 4.4.4 KITKAT OS	Android 4.4.4 KITKAT OS	Android Lollipop 5.0 OS	Android 4.4.4 KITKAT OS	Android 4.4.4 KITKAT OS	Android Lollipop 5.0 OS	Android 4.4.4 KITKAT OS	Android 5.1 Lollipop
Launch Date	June, 2014	October, 2014	October, 2014	July, 2015	August, 2015	2016	July, 2015	Jan, 2017
