= InfoSonics =

InfoSonics Corporation
- Company type: Subsidiary
- Industry: Telecommunications Equipment
- Founded: 1994
- Founder: Joseph Ram
- Defunct: 2018
- Fate: Parent company financial problems
- Headquarters: San Diego, California, United States
- Area served: United States
- Key people: Joseph Ram (president & CEO); Vernon A. LoForti (VP & CFO)
- Products: Smartphones, feature phones, tablets and accessories
- Parent: Cool Holdings, Inc.
- Subsidiaries: verykool
- Website: infosonics.com

InfoSonics Corporation was an American company that developed, manufactured, and distributed wireless handsets and accessories through its proprietary brand verykool and other private label brands. InfoSonics sold its products through carriers, distributors, and OEMs in Latin America, Europe, Africa, Asia Pacific and the United States.

It was best known for its line of inexpensive unlocked phones as well as its rugged phones in its verykool line of products.

It was subsidiary of Cool Holdings, Inc. a Miami-based company which changed its name to Simply, Inc in 2020. The company completely transformed and became an Apple Premiere Partner in the United States. It later went into liquidation.

== History ==
InfoSonics was founded in 1994 by Joseph Ram, the company's president and CEO. It became a public company in June 2004, and was initially listed on the American Stock Exchange under the symbol “IFO.” In August 2006, the company transferred to the NASDAQ under the symbol “IFON.” When the company first went public, it was primarily a distributor of products supplied by Samsung, VK Corporation, LG, Novatel and others. In 2005 it purchased Primasel S.A., a distributor of Samsung products primarily in Argentina.

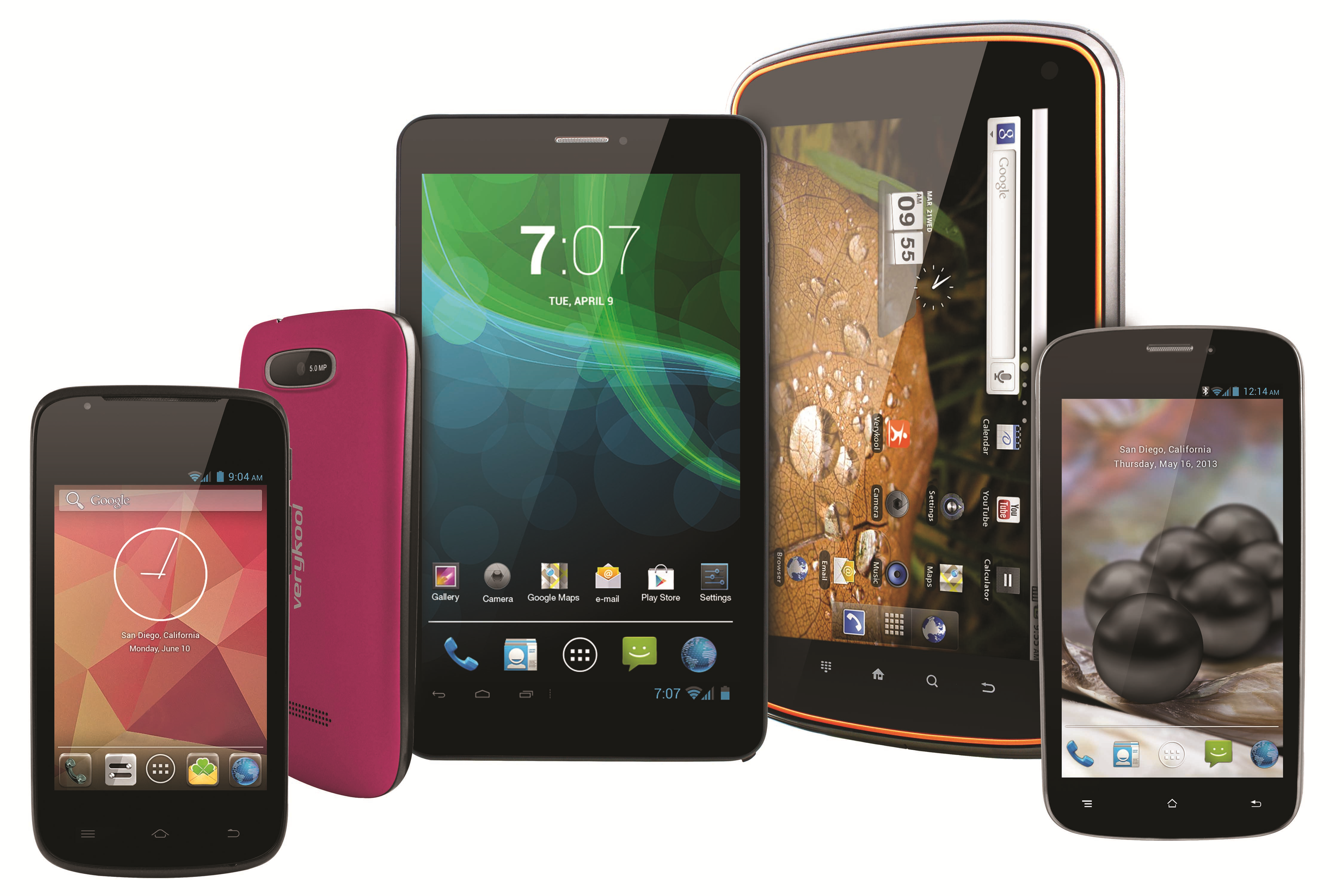
The verykool s400, T742, R800, and s470 from InfoSonics Corporation.

The company followed up with a secondary stock offering in 2006, offering 2.2 million shares. The same year the company reached $240 million in sales. 2006 was also the year it began to develop its own wireless handsets under the verykool brand. InfoSonics ceased its distributing business in March 2012, primarily due to protective import tariffs that had been enacted on certain electronic devices since 2009. After terminating its distributing business, it became solely a manufacturer and distributor of its own products under the verykool brand.

InfoSonics entered into an agreement with Ingram Micro in December 2012 for the distribution of its verykool brand to customers in the United States. It also launched an online store in the U.S. market for consumer purchase of the verykool product line.

InfoSonics Corporation reported a second consecutive quarter of profitability after 2013 4th quarter results were announced. The company had a 48% gross profit in the 4th quarter compared to 2012 with operating expenses declining 26% for the same period. InfoSonics also reported gross revenue of $37.9 million, an increase of $3.6 million from the year prior. It continued to increase sales by year-end 2014, bringing in $48.1 million, a 27% increase from the prior year.
