= X-tigi Mobile =

Hong Kong based smartphone manufacturer

X-Tigi Mobile was a Hong Kong–based smartphone manufacturer that was founded in 2006. The company had a research & development center and factory located in China. X-Tigi service network is available in most African countries (especially Kenya and Ghana) since it entered the African market in 2009.

X-Tigi mobile phones were known for power-bank phones that could last weeks in Africa. In 2017, the company launched its first 4G LTE smartphone—Inspire 3, that supports fingerprint reader at the back in Africa.

In 2017, X-Tigi is now in partnership with over 10,000 retailers in Africa (especially Kilimall, Jumia), competing with the share value of Samsung and Tecno, Infinix.

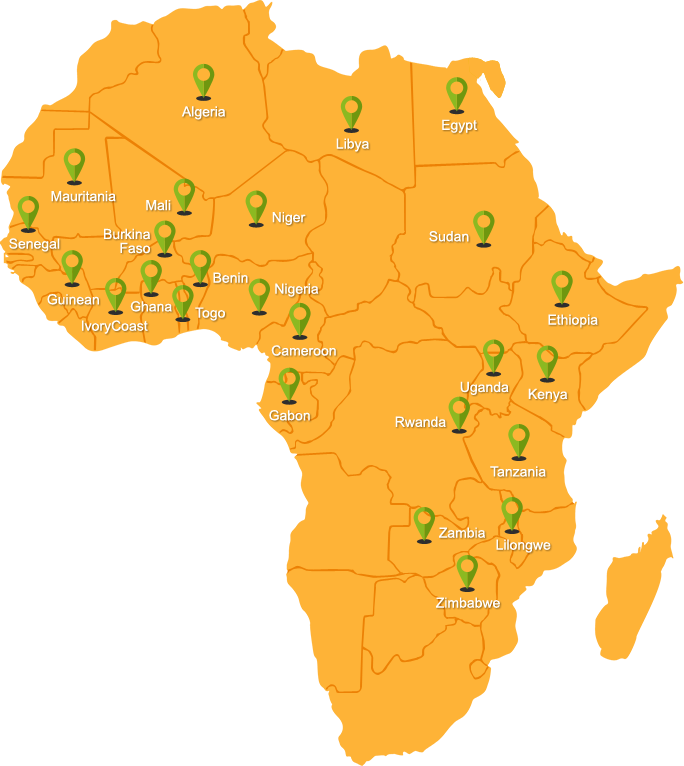
X-tigi network in Africa

== X-Tigi Kenya ==
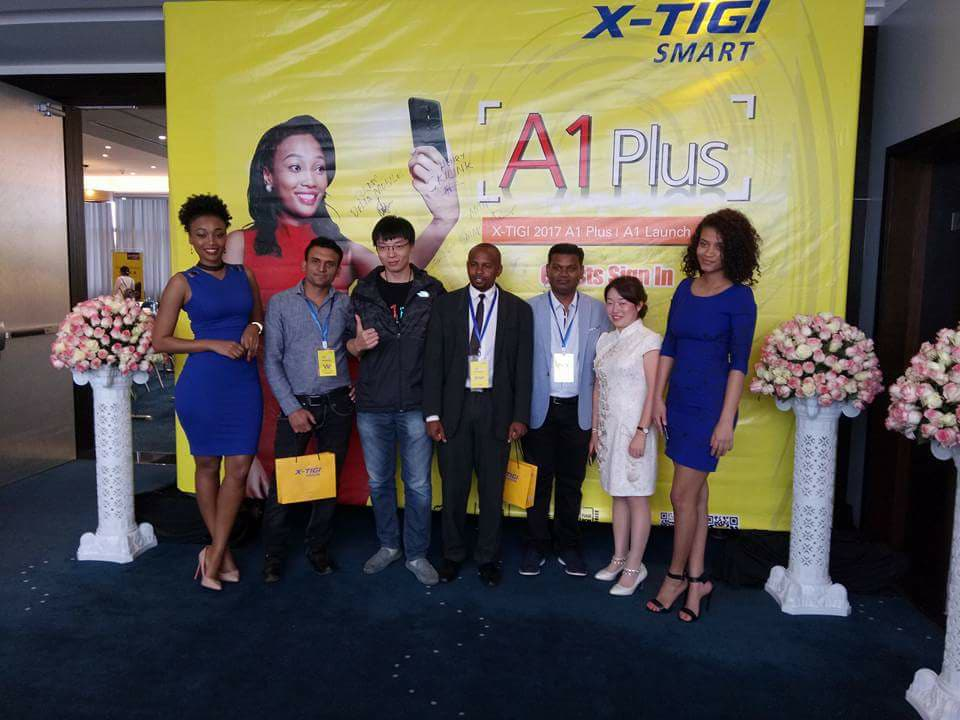
X-Tigi Flagship A1Plus Release Conference 2017 in Kenya

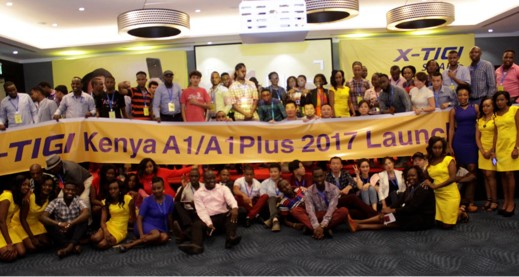
X-Tigi Kenya Team 2017

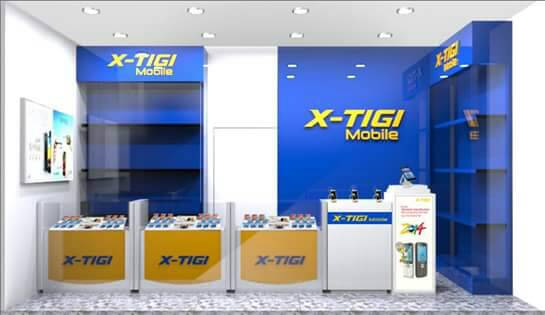
X-Tigi Exclusive Store in Kenya

X-Tigi started business in Kenya since 2009, meanwhile some new flagship smartphones with specification of 64 GB ROM plus 4 GB RAM such as X-Tigi A1 plus were launched, which made X-Tigi brand compete with the share value of Samsung and Tecno, Infinix in Kenya.

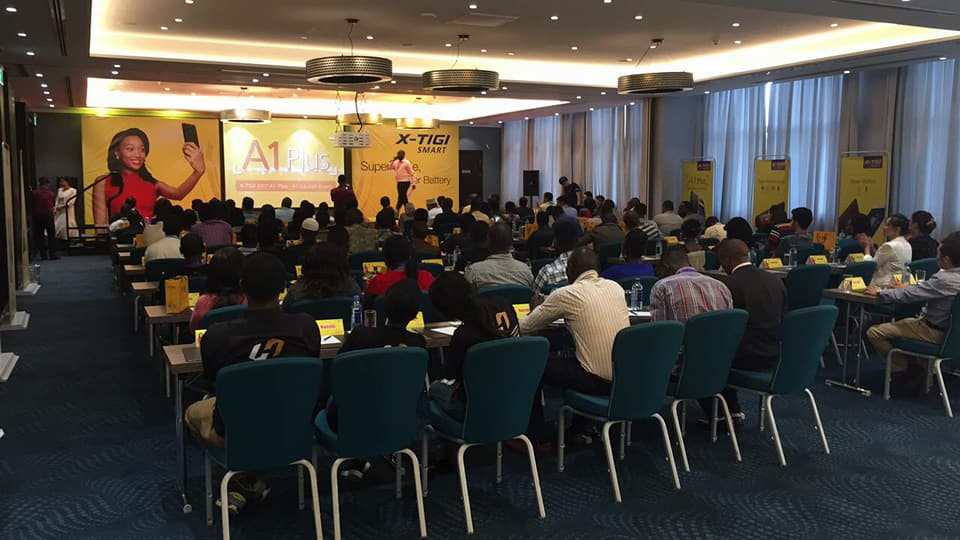
X-Tigi A1 Plus Launch 2017 in Kenya

In 2016, X-Tigi started cooperation with Jumia Kenya, which made X-Tigi goods reachable online in Kenya.

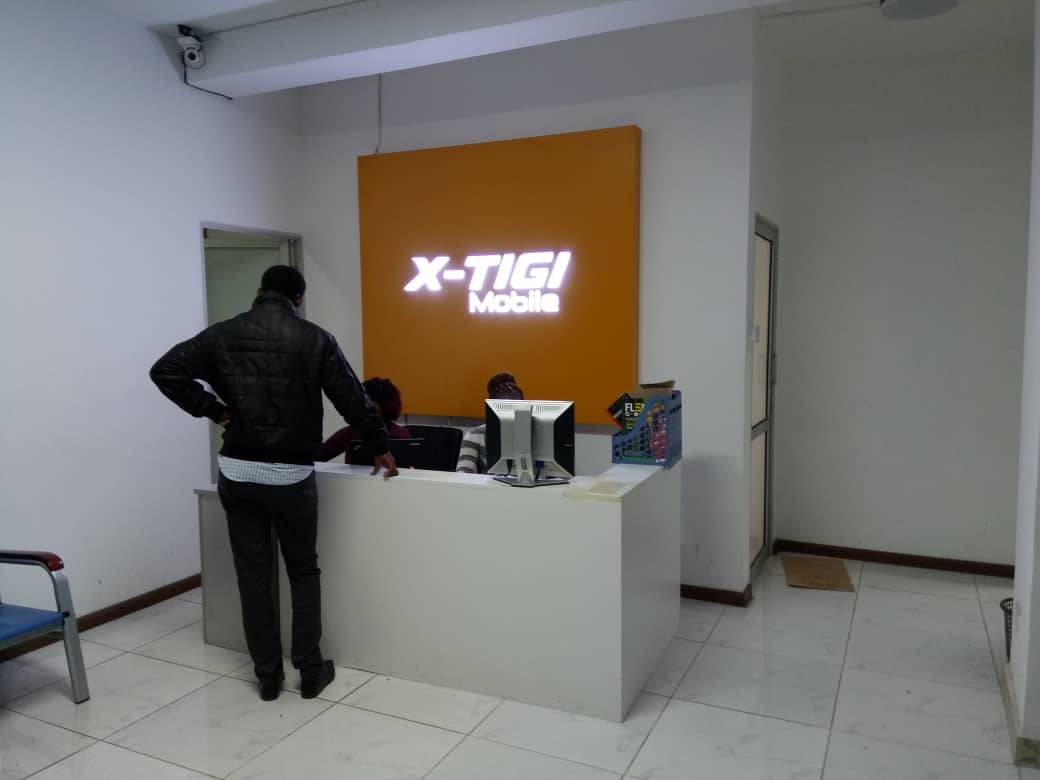
X-Tigi Office Kenya

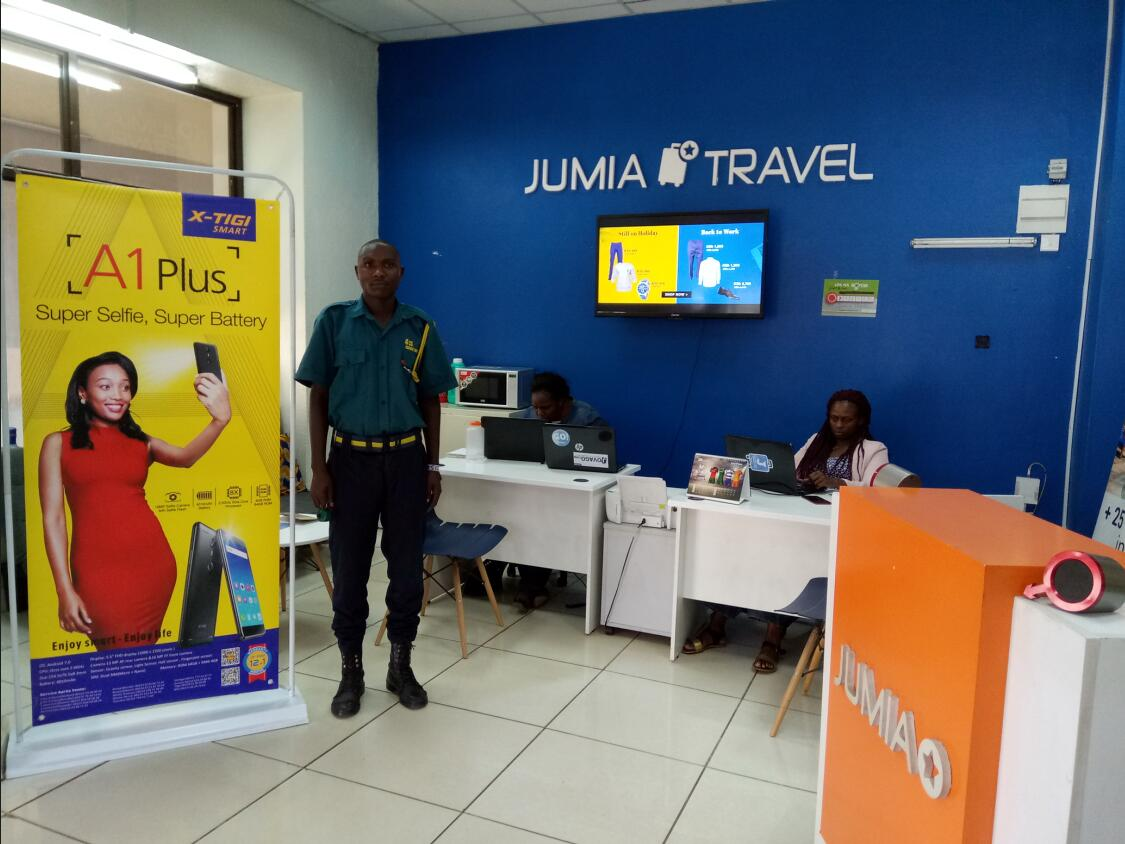
X-Tigi in Cooperation with jumia kenya

== X-Tigi Ghana ==
X-Tigi entered into Ghana in 2007, then its rapid expanding makes X-Tigi Ghana one of the famous mobile brands in Ghana.

X-Tigi Offices have been established in at least three cities up to 2017 in Ghana.

== X-Tigi Cote d'ivoire ==
X-Tigi started business in Cote d'ivoire since 2010, and X-Tigi brand became in partnership with Jumia Cote d'ivoire in 2016, which makes X-Tigi goods both available online and offline in Cote d'ivoire market.

== X-Tigi Tanzania ==
X-Tigi first showed its brand in Tanzania in 2016, and then grow fast with offices established in main cities such as Dar es salaam, Mwanza, Arusha, etc.

== X-Tigi in other African countries ==
In the past ten years, X-Tigi Mobile has set its brand shown in many other African countries, namely, Mali, Burkina Faso, Gabon, Guinea, Togo, Senegal, Cameroon, Benin, Rwanda and so on, with more than 30 million handsets sold.
