= Madhav Sheth =

Indian business executive and entrepreneur

- Born: 21 April 1980 (age 46); Mumbai, Maharashtra, India
- Education: St. Xavier's College, Mumbai; SVKM's NMIMS; Harvard Business School
- Occupation: Business executive
- Years active: 2016–present
- Employer: NxtQuantum Shift Technologies
- Known for: EX Co-founding CEO of Realme India; EX CEO of HTech; Founder and CEO of NxtQuantum Shift Technologies

Madhav Sheth (born 21 April 1980) is an Indian business executive and entrepreneur. He is the founder and CEO of NxtQuantum Shift Technologies, the parent entity of the Ai+ smartphone brand. He previously served as the co-founder and vice president of Realme India, and as the chief executive officer of HTech India (Honor).

== Education ==
Sheth was born and raised in Mumbai, Maharashtra. He completed his undergraduate studies at St. Xavier's College, Mumbai, and subsequently obtained a postgraduate business qualification from Narsee Monjee Institute of Management Studies (NMIMS), Mumbai. He later completed executive education programmes at Harvard Business School.

== Career ==
=== Oppo and Realme (2016–2023) ===
Sheth entered the corporate smartphone industry in 2016, joining Oppo as its Sales Director for India to oversee online and offline retail expansion. In May 2018, he co-founded Realme alongside Sky Li (Li Bingzhong) as an independent spin-off brand under BBK Electronics. He initially served as the CEO of Realme India and Europe, and was appointed corporate vice president in 2019.

In October 2021, Sheth was named President of Realme's newly formed International Business Group, expanding his operational remit to cover markets across Europe, Latin America, and India. During his tenure, the brand reached the position of fourth-largest smartphone vendor by volume in India.

In July 2020, following localised regulatory scrutiny regarding pre-installed applications on handsets of Chinese origin, Sheth publicly asserted that the company did not share user data with third parties and deployed software patches allowing users to remove flagged software. He formally resigned from all corporate roles at Realme on 14 June 2023, shifting briefly into a strategic advisory role before exiting completely.

=== HTech (2023–2024) ===
In August 2023, Sheth assumed the role of CEO at HTech (Honortech Universal Private Limited), an independent Indian licensing entity established to manage operations and retail distribution for Honor smartphones in India. Under his leadership, the firm relaunched operations via the Honor 90 5G device, announced a ₹400 crore local ecosystem investment, and initiated domestic sourcing discussions with local contract assembly firms before his departure in late 2024.

=== NxtQuantum Shift Technologies (2025–present) ===
In early 2025, Sheth established NxtQuantum Shift Technologies India Private Limited as founder and CEO. The enterprise introduced the "Ai+" smartphone brand on 8 July 2025, deploying two initial consumer models: the Ai+ Nova 5G and the Ai+ Pulse 4G. The devices operate on NxtQuantum OS, an Android-based user interface configured to host user cloud backend data exclusively on localised, MeitY-approved Indian data centres. Physical assembly was structured through contract manufacturing partnerships in Noida.

== Legal issues and litigation ==
In April 2026, Sheth and NxtQuantum Shift Technologies filed a commercial litigation suit (case file: CS(COMM) 429/2026) in the Delhi High Court seeking injunctive relief against multiple independent Indian technology reviewers on YouTube. The dispute emerged after independent video evaluations alleged data security vulnerabilities, unexpected background tracking software, and reliance on unmodified foreign original design manufacturer (ODM) physical blueprints, challenging marketing representations regarding the brand's sovereign Indian pedigree.

On 28 April 2026, the Delhi High Court issued an ad interim injunction directing the temporary restriction of the specific disputed review videos, finding that the initial digital uploads lacked verified technical or expert evaluation and carried commercial risk to the firm's consumer rollout. Sheth and the company maintained that all cloud infrastructure remains strictly localised within India with zero external data routing.
