= Wasam =

Chinese electronics manufacturer

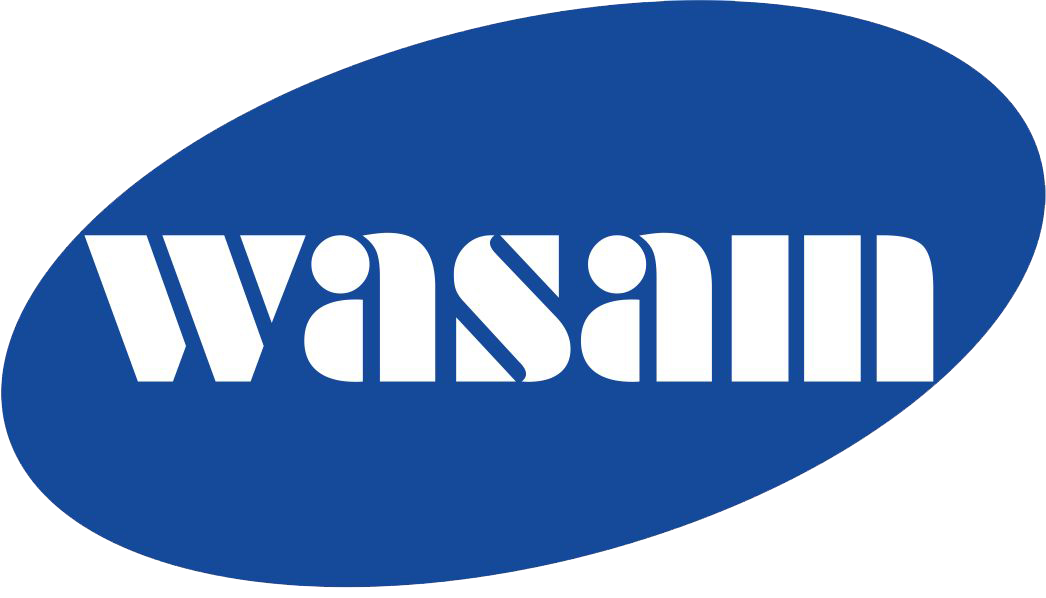
- Native name: 深圳市华森科技股份有限公司
- Company type: Private
- Industry: Consumer electronics Computer hardware
- Founded: 2005; 21 years ago
- Founder: Sammi Lian
- Headquarters: Shenzhen, Guangdong, China
- Area served: Selected markets List: China; Malaysia; Philippines; India; Indonesia; Turkey; Thailand; Vietnam
- Key people: Sammi Lian (CEO)
- Products: Mobile phones Smartphones; Tablet computers Smart home devices
- Number of employees: Approximately 5,000
- Website: www.wasam.hk

Shenzhen Wasam Technology Co. Ltd also known as Wasam is a Chinese national hi-tech manufacturer of mobile phones, tablets and consumer electronics.
