= Wileyfox =

British smartphone manufacturer

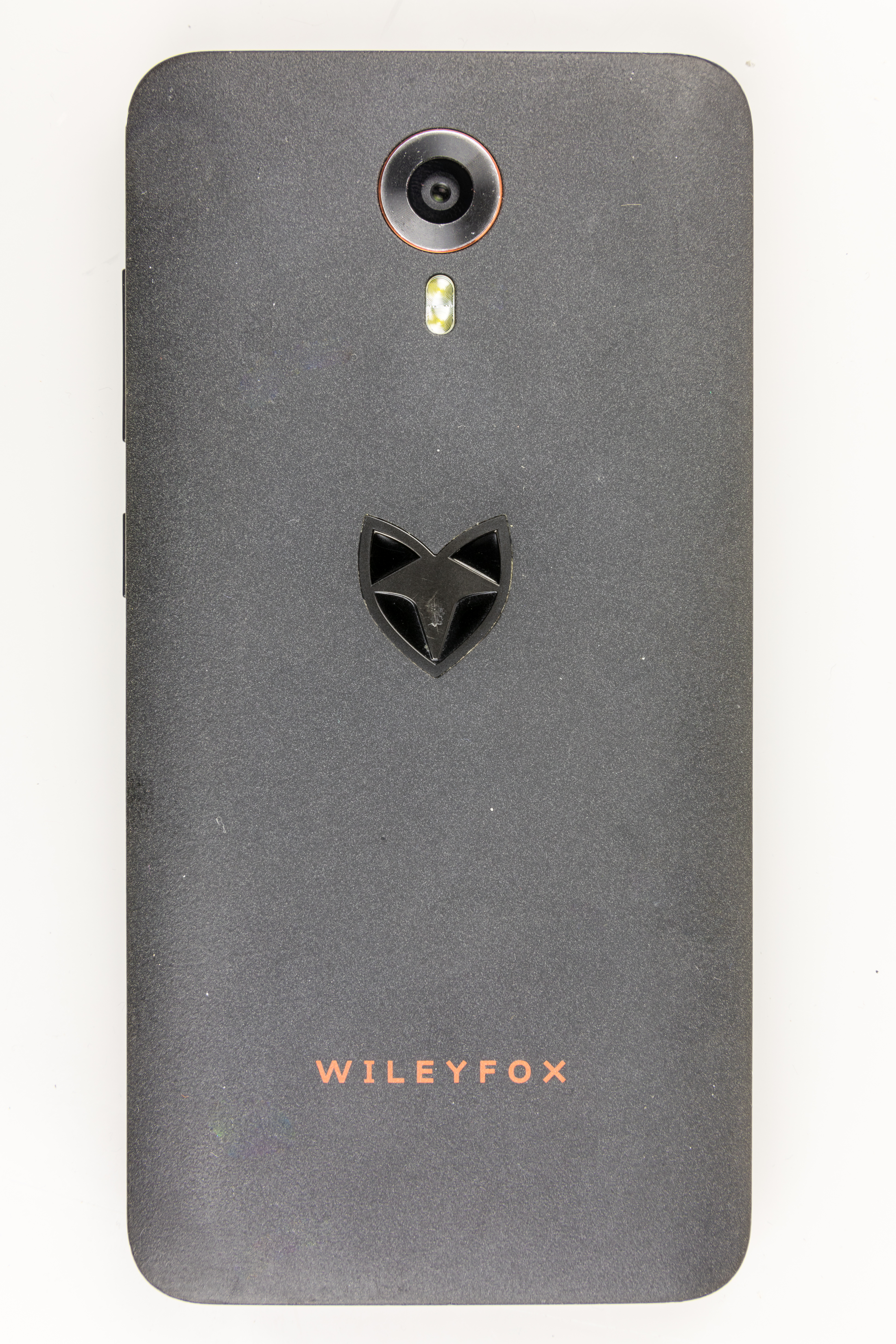
- Wileyfox Swift
- Type: Private
- Industry: Telecommunications equipment
- Founded: 2015; 11 years ago
- Headquarters: London, United Kingdom
- Area served: Worldwide
- Key people: Nick Muir, Victoria McManus and Naeem Walji
- Products: Smartphones
- Website: wileyfox.com

Wileyfox was a British smartphone manufacturer founded in 2015. It went into administration on 6 February 2018. On 19 March 2018 it was announced that Santok Group had agreed a licensing deal covering sales of handsets in Europe and South Africa.

The firm aimed to provide products that were more affordable than their competitors, whilst not compromising on quality. The company claimed that by having a smaller workforce and no legacy devices to support, they would be able to sell their devices for lower prices. Wileyfox stated that the commoditisation of hardware would enable them to differentiate their products from competitors using other Android distros, or iOS.

== History ==
The company was founded in 2015 by Nick Muir, who served as CEO, Victoria Denman and Naeem Walji. At launch, the company was owned by the Meridian Group, which was the parent company of handset makers Kazam and Russia-based Fly Mobile. Meridian Group chairman Nooreddin Valimahomed was also given a founder credit. The company launched with a single product, the Wileyfox Swift.

In 2017, founders Muir and Denman left Wileyfox, where they had served as CEO and CMO, respectively, to found a startup accelerator called Growth Hackers Global. In 2018, the company entered administration in the UK.

== Products ==
This article states the actual device specifications, which may differ from specification sheets provided by Wileyfox.

=== 1st generation: Swift, Storm ===
These devices were announced in August 2015, originally running Cyanogen OS 12.1, with sales and shipments starting later that year. Both devices have dual SIM capability. The Swift is codenamed crackling, whereas the codename of Storm is kipper. Devices offer a non-stereo speaker.

==== Specification overview ====
Model	SoC	CPU	GPU	Storage capacity	Removable storage	RAM	OS	Size	Weight	Battery	Display	Rear-facing Camera	Front-facing Camera	Launch price
Wileyfox Storm	Qualcomm Snapdragon 615	Octa core (1.7 GHz quad-core Cortex-A53 and 1.0 GHz quad-core Cortex-A53)	Adreno 405	32 GB	microSD up to 128 GB	3 GB	Cyanogen OS 12.1	155.6 x 77.3 x 9.2 mm	157 g (5.54 oz)	2500mAh non-removable Li-Po	5.5" 1920x1080 (400ppi) with laminated glass from LG Electronics	20 MP with f/1.8 aperture	8 MP with LED flash	£199
Wileyfox Swift	Qualcomm Snapdragon 410	1.2 GHz quad-core Cortex-A53	Adreno 306	16 GB	microSDXC cards up to 2 TiB (2048 GiB)	2 GB	Cyanogen OS 12.1	141.15 x 71 x 9.37 mm	135 g (4.76 oz)	2500mAh removable Li-Po	5" 1280×720 (294ppi) fully laminated IPS display from JDI with Corning Gorilla Glass 3	13 MP with f/2.0 aperture	5 MP	£129

==== Swift ====
The Wileyfox Swift design is similar to the Qualcomm Seed reference design and by extension many rebadging designs, like the Longcheer L8150. This makes it comparable to 2nd generation Android One devices. Video recording in 1080p is supported at up to 30fps; 720p recording is supported at up to 60fps. The rear camera sensor is a Samsung S5K3M2 chip with Isocell pixels, which provide better image quality when compared to BSI pixels. The device supports GPS and GLONASS satellite positioning. Two colour variants, sandstone black and white, are produced; however, availability varies by country. At its time of release, the Swift was the cheapest Cyanogen OS device available in Western Europe. Although not initially available, as of late 2016 replacement batteries are now sold by the manufacturer on their website.

The device was well received by the public and media, however, comments have been made about the micro-USB port being too recessed (preventing many third-party cables from properly locking in the port). The plug shaft length of cables supplied by Wileyfox exceeds the minimum length mandated by the USB specification by approximately 0,5mm. Wileyfox's cables do not meet USB specification requirements in other aspects, and as of 2016-01-15, Wileyfox did not pass the compliance requirements to use USB logos or trademarks. Because the metal ring holding the rear camera lens has sharp edges, moving the device on a comparatively soft surface, such as a wooden table, easily leaves scratch marks. The accessory clip-on covers available from Wileyfox alleviate this issue by protruding beyond the metal ring, and are offered in black and red orange. While these cases protect the back, rear camera lens and sides, they do not protrude to protect the screen. The device dimensions change to 73mm width, 143mm height, and 10mm thickness. GPS and GLONASS performance is fast and accurate, for early production dates. However, a metallic adhesive layer on the inside of the back cover was added in later production batches, for a purpose not known to the public. For phones produced with this layer GPS and GLONASS reception can be poor, unless it is manually peeled off.

In addition to the officially supported, proprietary firmware Cyanogen OS, its basis, the Android derivative CyanogenMod, supports the device. The first release for the Swift is version 13.0, which was made available on 2016-03-16, simultaneously with the first wave of CyanogenMod 13 releases. As of 2020, the device is still supported by LineageOS, with LineageOS 17.1 allowing Android 10 to run on the device. In February 2022, LineageOS support ended.

==== Storm ====
The Wileyfox Storm is a 5.5-inch FHD smartphone based around a unibody design. Like the Swift, the Storm uses a 2500mAh battery, but the unibody construction makes the battery non-removable. A side-mounted slot accessed by a pinhole reveals a tray that allows a combination of a Micro and Nano SIM card or a MicroSD card and a Micro SIM card. The front-facing camera is 8 MP and benefits from a LED flash for selfies. The rear camera is a 20 MP Sony EXMOR IMX220 sensor capable of 1080p and 90 fps slow-motion capture. The device supports GPS and GLONASS satellite positioning. Two colour variants, sandstone black and white, are produced; however, availability varies by country.

=== 2nd generation: Spark, Spark +, Spark X ===
In June 2016, a new range of phones was announced, consisting of Spark, Spark + and Spark X, which use Mediatek MT6735 SoCs and provide dual SIM capability. The device codenames are porridge for Spark and Spark + and porridgek3 for Spark X.

==== Specification overview ====
Model	SoC	CPU	GPU	Storage capacity	Removable storage	RAM	OS	Size	Weight	Battery	Display	Rear-facing Camera	Front-facing Camera	Launch price
Wileyfox Spark	MediaTek 6735	64-bit Quad-core 1.3 GHz	Mali T-720	8 GB	microSD cards up to 32 gigabyte	1 GB	Cyanogen OS 13.0	143 x 70.4 x 8.65 mm	134.5 g	2200mAh removable Li-Po	5" 1280×720 (294ppi) IPS display	8 MP	8 MP	
Wileyfox Spark +	MediaTek 6735	64-bit Quad-core 1.3 GHz	Mali T-720	16 GB	microSD cards up to 32 gigabyte	2 GB	Cyanogen OS 13.0	143 x 70.4 x 8.65 mm	134.5 g	2200mAh removable Li-Po	5" 1280×720 (294ppi) IPS display	13 MP	8 MP	
Wileyfox Spark X	MediaTek 6735	64-bit Quad-core 1.3 GHz	Mali T-720	16 GB	microSD cards up to 32 gigabyte	2 GB	Cyanogen OS 13.0	154.35 x 78.6 x 8.75 mm	134.5 g	3000mAh removable Li-Po	5.5" 1280×720 (267ppi) IPS display	13 MP	8 MP	

=== 3rd generation: Swift 2, Swift 2 Plus, Swift 2 X ===
In November 2016, a new range of phones were announced: Swift 2, Swift 2 Plus and Swift 2 X. The devices use Qualcomm SoCs again, specifically the MSM8937 octa-core clocked at 1.4 GHz, paired with an Adreno 505 GPU.

All third-generation phones support Qualcomm's Quick Charge 3.0 standard, although no charger is included in the box. The devices are codenamed marmite.

The device codenamed champagne seems to be marmite devices with the back of the phone coloured gold.

==== Specification overview ====
Model	SoC	CPU	GPU	Storage capacity	Removable storage	RAM	OS	Size	Weight	Battery	Display	Rear-facing Camera	Front-facing Camera	Launch price
Wileyfox Swift 2	Qualcomm Snapdragon 430	64-bit Octa-core 1.4 GHz	Adreno 505	16 GB	microSD cards up to 64 gigabyte	2 GB	Android Nougat 7.1.1 (upgrade from Cyanogen 13)	143.7 x 71.9 x 8.6 mm	155 g	2700mAh non-removable Li-Po	5" 1280×720 (294ppi) IPS display	13 MP	8 MP	159 GBP
Wileyfox Swift 2 Plus	Qualcomm Snapdragon 430	64-bit Octa-core 1.4 GHz	Adreno 505	32 GB	microSD cards up to 64 gigabyte	3 GB	Android Nougat 7.1.1 (upgrade from Cyanogen 13)	143.7 x 71.9 x 8.6 mm	155 g	2700mAh non-removable Li-Po	5" 1280×720 (294ppi) IPS display	16 MP	8 MP	189 GBP
Wileyfox Swift 2 X	Qualcomm Snapdragon 430	64-bit Octa-core 1.4 GHz	Adreno 505	32 GB	microSD cards up to 64 gigabyte	3 GB	Android Nougat 7.1.1 (upgrade from Cyanogen 13)	147 x 73 x 8.2 mm	152.8 g	3050mAh non-removable Li-Po	5.2" 1920x1080 (424ppi) IPS display	16 MP	8 MP	219 GBP

Wileyfox runout model came installed with Android 8.1, 3GB RAM, and 32GB internal memory. However, it also has an inherent fault with the front facing 'Selfie' camera. The fault manifests itself by when it is initially activated, the exposure is correct, but after a second or two, the screen goes dark as if night has quickly fallen. This has been acknowledged by Wileyfox who stated that they were working on a software fix to address the issue. As of September 2020, no fix has been released.

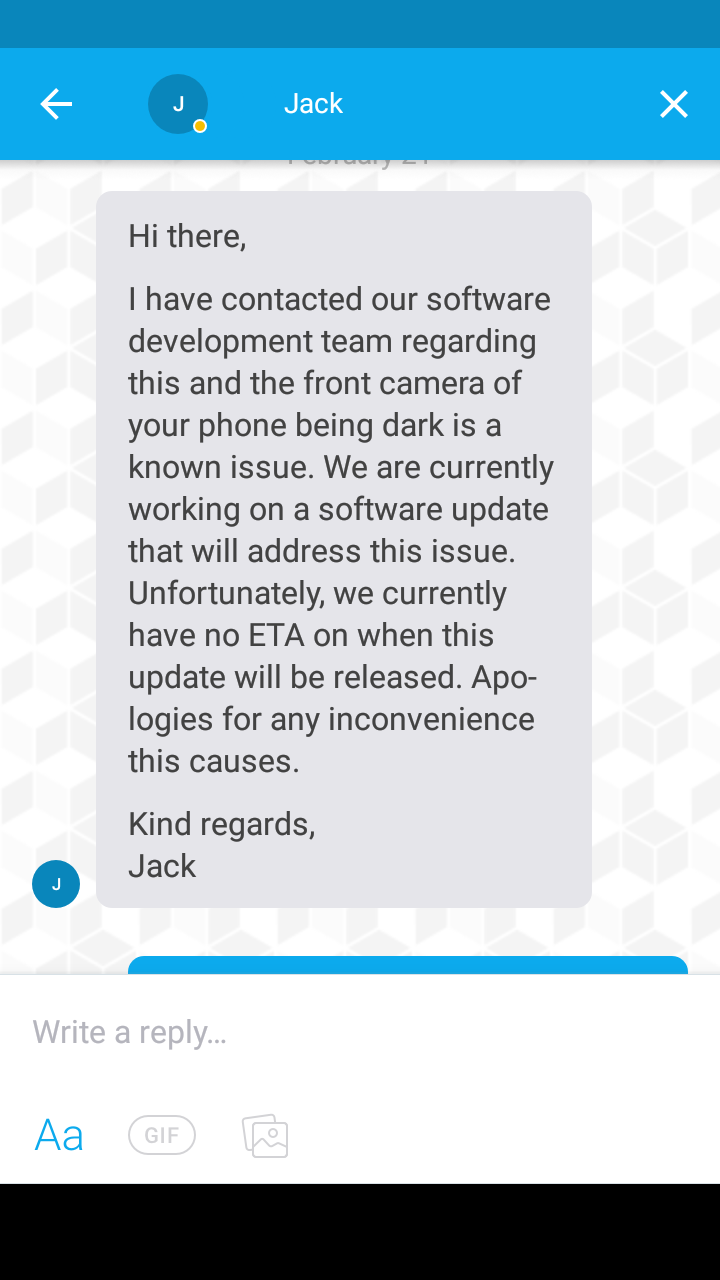
WileyFox response to camera fault

=== Accessories ===
The firm also produced spare batteries, clip-on covers, and screen protectors specific to their phones.
