= Kazam =

British mobile phone brand

KAZAM
- Type: Private
- Industry: Mobile Phones
- Founded: May 7, 2013; 13 years ago
- Founder: Michael Coombes and James Atkins
- Headquarters: United Kingdom
- Number of locations: UK, Germany, France, Spain and Poland
- Area served: Europe
- Products: Tornado; Trooper; Thunder; Life; Toughshield
- Website: KAZAM; Blog

Kazam was a UK based smartphone brand established in 2013 by former HTC employees. The brand gathered publicity by offering free screen replacements for their products.

It was a subsidiary of Meridian Capital Partners, which also owned phone brand Wileyfox. Documents submitted to Companies House show that Kazam went into administration in April 2017 and into liquidation in April 2018.
