= G'Five =

Chinese consumer electronics company

G'Five International Limited 基伍国际有限公司
- Industry: Consumer electronics
- Founded: 2008
- Founder: Zhāng Wénxué (张文学)
- Headquarters: Shenzhen, Guangdong, china
- Key people: Zhāng Wénxué (Chairman and CEO)
- Products: Mobile phones, Smartphones
- Website: http://www.gfivemobile.com

G'Five International Limited (simplified Chinese: 基伍国际有限公司; traditional Chinese: 基伍國際有限公司; pinyin: Jīwu Guójì Yǒuxiàn Gōngsī) was a Chinese consumer electronics company headquartered in Shenzhen, Guangdong and registered in Hong Kong. Founded in 2003, the company specialises in manufacturing mobile phones, smartphones to emerging markets under G'Five brand.

In the second quarter of 2010, G'Five sold 5 million mobile handsets, becoming the tenth largest manufacturer of mobile phones worldwide.

== Gfive's G Cloud ==
Gfive had launched 5 high-end smartphones under G Cloud range of internet technology. It will offer users up to 5.5 GB free cloud space memory through which user can easily synchronise data to laptops etc. Even if user lost his/her mobile he/she can just transfer all the data by one touch on his new phone's G Cloud service.

== Products ==
G'five current flagship phone is Gfive President G10. It is a smartphone with a total of 5.7 inches full HD of display, and President G10 by G'FIVE is equipped with a Quad-Core 1.7 GHz processor with 32 GB ROM, 1 GB RAM, and with the 13.0 MP back camera, 5.0 MP front-facing camera. Other smartphones GFive produced are President G12, G9, A97, President G6, G10 (Fashion), A5, A1 (Spark).
