= Torque Mobile =

Filipino mobile company

- Product type: Mobile phone, Smartphone
- Country: Philippines
- Introduced: 2008; 18 years ago
- Markets: Philippines

Torque Mobile is a Philippine smartphone and tablet brand. It was founded in 2008 as one of the first local mobile phone and electronics manufacturers that imports products from original design manufacturers in China to be sold in the local market.

As of 2019, the company also sells e-cigarettes and vapes aside from their usual smartphones.
