= 10.or =

Chinese smartphone manufacturer

- 10.or logo
- Company type: Private
- Industry: Smartphones
- Founded: 2005
- Founders: Kartik Kumar
- Defunct: 23 October 2021
- Headquarters: Sonipat, Haryana
- Area served: Worldwide
- Products: Smartphone

10.or, often pronounced Tenor, is a mobile brand launched by Chinese company Huaqin Technology, which was founded in 2005. The brand was launched in India with an exclusive partnership with Amazon India.

In 2017, the company made a debut in India with the 10.or E smartphone, which was sold exclusively on Amazon India. The brand made numerous subsequent product launches. The brand was officially shut down on 23 October 2021.

== Products ==
Prior to 2018, three models were launched. They debuted in India in 2017 with the model 10.or E in two variants. It became a hit among younger generations and was viewed as a low budget phone with some good features. In August 2018, the 10.or D2 phone was launched. After almost a year, the company launched its latest phone, the 10.or G2, in July 2019. Two variants with 4GB and 6GB RAM were also released.

10.or models include:

- 10.or D
- 10.or E (with two variants)
- 10.or G
- 10.or D2
- 10.or G2
