= GTel Zimbabwe =

Zimbabwean manufacturer of mobile phones and accessories

- Industry: ICT Products Manufacturing
- Founded: 2011 - Harare
- Headquarters: Harare, Zimbabwe
- Key people: Chamunorwa Shumba (Founder), Cheryl Shumba
- Products: Mobile phones, ICT accessories
- Website: www.gtel.co.zw

GTel Zimbabwe (popularly known as GTel) is a Zimbabwean owned company that develops and manufactures ICT products and services. It is the first locally owned mobile phone manufacturer in Zimbabwe. In 2014, GTel launched the SL 5.5 which became the 2nd slimmest mobile phone handset in the world behind the Asian Oppo that year.

Flagship Phones

GTel's flagship line is called “Infinity” with a numeral at the end used to denote the superiority in the product lineup.

Infinity X

The Infinity X(also known as the Infinity 10) is GTel's current flagship phone. It was launched on 14 February 2022, and its the direct successor of the Infinity 9. The Infinity X boasts a 48 MP Main Camera, 5 MP Ultra Wide Camera and a 2 MP Depth Camera. It has a display of 6.7 inches, (84.8% screen-to-body ratio) and it runs on Android 11. It has 4 GB RAM and 128 GB ROM that is expandable. The Infinity X also comes 6000mah of battery capacity.

Infinity 9

The Infinity 9 is the direct predecessor to the Infinity X. It arguably the most popular of all GTel phones. The Infinity 9 comes packed with a 6.5-inch display, 13 MP Camera, 3 GB RAM & 64 GB ROM expandable to 256 GB. It has dual SIM and a battery capacity of 5000 mAh.

== History ==
GTel Zimbabwe was founded in October 2009 as a franchise of G-Tide Mobile International. It re-branded to GTel in July 2011. GTel Zimbabwe was founded by Chamunorwa Shumba and Cheryl Shumba. GTel is headquartered in Harare and Shumba is the founding chief executive officer.

As of 2015, GTel had one million mobile phone users in Zimbabwe. In 2015, the company expanded its operations to Kenya. The company released three new phone models in 2018, including the X7 that has wireless charging.
