= Cherry (brand) =

Filipino mobile company and store

- Logo used since 2021 (Note: The logo name has been changed from cherry mobile to cherry.)
- Type: Electronics
- Industry: Consumer electronics
- Founded: 2009; 17 years ago
- Headquarters: Philippines
- Area served: Southeast Asia, Europe
- Products: Smartphones; Tablet computers; Smart TVs; Earphones
- Parent: Cosmic Technologies
- Website: cherryshop.com.ph

Cherry (also known as Cherry Philippines, stylized as CHERRY, formerly known as Cherry Mobile), is a Philippine mobile phone and consumer electronics brand by Cosmic Technologies, established by Maynard Ngu in 2009. The company imports mobile phones manufactured in China and markets them under the Cherry Mobile brand. Most of Cherry's current lineup come with Wi-Fi, capacitive touch screens and run on Android and formerly Windows.

== History ==
Cherry Mobile's old logo (2009–2020)

Apart from being the first legal mobile phone brand with dual and triple Subscriber Identity Module (SIM) systems in the Philippines, Cherry Mobile also marketed the first Windows-enabled phone in the country as a result of an exclusive partnership with Microsoft.

In 2010, Cherry Mobile was voted IT Company of the Year in the 3rd CyberPress Awards Most of Cherry Mobile's current lineup come with Wi-Fi, capacitive touch screens and run on the Android platform.

In 2013 Cherry Mobile expanded its market by distributing their products in Thailand and in Myanmar.

In 2015, Cosmic Technologies, along with rival mobile device company MyPhone, partnered with Google for the Android One initiative, both of them releasing their respective devices based on Google's reference designs using MediaTek's quad-core MT6582 system-on-chip.

In June 2015, Cosmic Technologies announced that they will be launching two Windows Phone handsets preloaded with Windows 10 Mobile under their mobile phone brand, namely the Alpha Prime 4 and the Alpha Prime 5, which was released in the second half of 2015. Both devices came with a 1.1 GHz quad core Qualcomm Snapdragon 210, support for WCDMA 900/2100, FDD-LTE B1/B3/B5/B7, and a 2 megapixel front-facing camera. The Alpha Prime 4 will have a 4-inch screen, a 5 megapixel main camera, 4 GB of ROM, and 512 MB of RAM, while the Alpha Prime 5 will have a 5-inch screen, 8 megapixel main camera, 8 GB of ROM and 1 GB of RAM.

Cherry Mobile Flare S7 series' specifications and design were leaked ahead of their launch on 12 October 2018. Its design for the S7 Deluxe and Plus series were using the long notch from the iPhone XS.

In 2016, Cherry Mobile established official presence in Europe. It started distributing its products in Germany.

In 2020, Cherry Mobile became part of the broader CHERRY brand and adopted a new name and logo, alongside other Cosmic Technologies brands including Cherry Prepaid, CherryRoam, Cherry Home, and Cherry Pet.

The manufacturer switched to the new "Aqua" branding for the S series in late 2020, dropping the previous "Flare" branding. The Aqua S9, Aqua Infinity, and Aqua S9 Max are some of these phones. Gizguide's Smartphone of the Year accolades went to both the Aqua S9 and Aqua S9 Max, with the Aqua S9 taking home the title of "Entry-level Smartphone of the Year" and the Aqua S9 Max taking home the title of "Budget Smartphone of the Year."

In March 2023, its Globe-powered telco arm Cherry Prepaid shut down, with an SMS advisory sent to users in January, notifying them regarding scheduled service closure and recommending them to switch to TM.

== Cubix ==
In 2015, Cosmic Technologies introduced a new smartphone brand named Cubix, with its first product being the Cubix Cube. The Cubix brand is Cosmic's response to the growing segment of budget-priced midrange phones, usually dominated by Chinese brands such as Lenovo. The Cubix Cube has 2 GB of RAM, 16 GB of ROM, a 13 megapixel rear camera and an 8 megapixel front camera. The phone also comes bundled with the Lazada app and is available through Lazada Philippines.

== Flare ==
The Flare series was Cherry’s mainstream line of budget Android smartphones from 2012 until it was replaced by the Aqua family in 2020. The first model - simply called the Cherry Mobile Flare - was announced on 24 October 2012 and went on sale the following month for ₱3,999, making it one of the most affordable dual‑core Ice Cream Sandwich handsets available in the Philippines. Annual refreshes followed, adding larger HD displays, LTE connectivity and biometric security. In October 2017 the 6‑inch Flare S6 Max and the battery‑centric Flare S6 Power (5,000 mAh) introduced USB‑C and fingerprint scanners across the range.

On 1 October 2018 Cherry launched the Flare S7 family, headlined by the Flare S7 Plus, its first handset with a notched “TrueView” display, wireless charging and an infrared face‑unlock camera.

The line expanded again on 25 July 2019 with seven Flare S8 variants; the flagship Flare S8 Plus adopted a full‑screen display and a motorised pop‑up dual selfie camera, while the base model kept the sub‑₱3.5 k price point.

== See also ==
- List of mobile phone makers by country
- List of Android smartphones
- MyPhone
- Torque Mobile
- Cherry OS (operating system)
