= MyPhone =

Manufacturer in the Philippines

my|phone
- Product type: Smartphones; Tablet computers
- Current owner: Solid Digital Group
- Country: Philippines
- Introduced: 2007; 19 years ago
- Related brands: Cherry Mobile
- Markets: Philippines, Hong Kong
- Registered as a trademark in: Philippines (January 2007)
- Tagline: "Be Inspired" "Tatak Pinoy, Tatak Matibay" (lit. 'Mark of a Pinoy, Mark of Toughness)' "Wala Ka Sa Phone Ko" (lit. 'You have no match against my Phone) "The Multimedia Company" '
- Website: www.myphone.com.ph

MyPhone (stylized as my|phone) is a Philippine mobile phone and multimedia brand designed and marketed by MySolid Technologies & Devices Corp. that use Google's Android mobile operating system. The first-generation MyPhone was announced in January 2007. Since then MyPhone has annually released new MyPhone models and updates.

== History ==
Solid Group Inc., incorporated as United Paracale Mining Co. on October 9, 1993, and renamed to its current name in June 1996, is the company behind the MyPhone brand. Between 2005 and 2006, the "MyPhone" trademark was planned and successfully registered on January 3, 2007. The group owns the brand through MySolid Technologies and Devices Corporation.

In 2010, the father of Solid Group's CEO, David Lim owned a mobile phone manufacturer which makes phones branded as "Amoy Solid". His father tasked his younger brother Jason to help sell the product due to being good in working with electronic gadgets in the Lim family. According to David, the Amoy Solid won't make much sales in the Philippines and remarked that “Just from the way it (the brand) sounds, nobody wanted it,”, He however took note of the phones' dual SIM feature and suggested to rename the brand. Amoy Solid is rebranded as My|Phone.

On January 3, 2007, Solid Group registered the MyPhone trademark with the Intellectual Property Office (IPO). Solid Group originally presented the brand to the market in September 2007. MyPhone was the country's first mobile phone brand to offer dual active SIM functionality. The MyPhone brand developed into a significant part of Solid Group, accounting for approximately half of the company's revenue in 2011.

On May 18, 2016, the company unveiled its line of ISDB-T-capable smartphones and tablets, thus becoming the third local smart device vendor to offer the feature.

On November 7, 2016, MyPhone expanded into mobile app development and digital content, touting itself as "The Multimedia Company". MyPhone has also announced the AGILA lock screen app to be bundled with select smartphone models, allowing local businesses to display advertising on phones similar to Amazon's practice of "special offer" ads embedded on discounted devices.

== Production and design ==
The mobile phones also include pre-installed applications and features designed by Filipino software developers. MyPhone mobile phones are reportedly manufactured in China.

== Market share ==
In a study made by International Data Corporation, MyPhone is the third biggest brand in the Philippines in terms of unit shipments in 2014 MyPhone is also distributed in Hong Kong to cater to Overseas Filipino Workers in the Chinese territory.

== Issues ==
=== Trademark case vs. Apple Inc.'s iPhone ===
Apple Inc. filed a lawsuit against Solid Group over the MyPhone name claiming that MyPhone is "confusingly similar" to its iPhone brand and that it would "likely to deceive or cause confusion". The Philippine Intellectual Property Office (IPO) dismissed the case filed by Apple Inc. on May 19, 2015, stating that, while both brands are similarly named by using the word phone, the word in question is not sufficient grounds in causing confusing between the two brands and noted that phone is a generic term for mobile phones.

IPO director Nathaniel Arevalo, criticized Apple Inc.'s move describing it as "a case of a giant trying to claim more territory than what it is entitled to, to the great prejudice of a local "Pinoy Phone" merchant who has managed to obtain a significant foothold in the mobile phone market through the marketing and sale of innovative products under a very distinctive trademark".

== See also ==
- List of mobile phone makers by country
