= List of Oppo products =

Products by Chinese company

The following is a list of products that Chinese consumer electronics manufacturer Oppo, running in several countries.

== Oppo F Series ==
Release timeline
2016	Oppo F1
2016	Oppo F1 Plus
2016	Oppo F1s
2017	Oppo F3
2017	Oppo F3 Plus
2017	Oppo F3 Lite
2017	Oppo F5
2017	Oppo F5 Plus
2017	Oppo F5 Youth
2018	Oppo F7
2018	Oppo F7 Youth
2018	Oppo F9
2018	Oppo F9 Pro
2019	Oppo F11
2019	Oppo F11 Pro
2020	Oppo F15
2020	Oppo F17
2020	Oppo F17 Pro
2021	Oppo F19
2021	Oppo F19s
2021	Oppo F19 Pro
2021	Oppo F19 Pro+ 5G
2022	Oppo F21 Pro
2022	Oppo F21 Pro 5G
2022	Oppo F21s Pro
2022	Oppo F21s Pro 5G
2023	Oppo F23
2024	Oppo F25 Pro
2024	Oppo F27 Pro+
2024	Oppo F27
2025	Oppo F29
2025	Oppo F29 Pro
2025	Oppo F31 Pro
2025	Oppo F31 Pro+
2026	Oppo F33
2026	Oppo F33 Pro
2026	Oppo F35
2026	Oppo F35 Pro

The Oppo F series are MediaTek or Qualcomm powered selfie-centered devices in which Oppo used their tagline "Selfie Expert".

Model	Release date	Display	Chipset	Memory		Rear camera	Front camera	Operating system	Battery	Ref.
Model	Release date	Display	Chipset	ROM	RAM	Rear camera	Front camera	Operating system	Battery	Ref.
F1	January 2016	5.0" HD (720 x 1280 px) IPS LCD	Qualcomm Snapdragon 616	16 GB	3 GB	13 MP	8 MP	Android 5.1; ColorOS 2.1	2500 mAh	
F1 Plus	March 2016	5.5" FHD (1080 x 1920 px) AMOLED	MediaTek Helio P10	64 GB	4 GB	13 MP	16 MP	Android 5.1; ColorOS 3	2850 mAh	
F1s	August 2016	5.5" HD (720 x 1280 px) IPS LCD	MediaTek MT6750	32/64 GB	3/4 GB	13 MP	16 MP	Android 5.1; ColorOS 3	3075 mAh	
F3	May 2017	5.5" FHD (1080 x 1920 px) IPS LCD	MediaTek MT6750T	64 GB	4 GB	13 MP	16 MP	Android 6.0; ColorOS 3	3200 mAh	
F3 Plus	March 2017	6" FHD (1080 x 1920 px) IPS LCD	Qualcomm Snapdragon 653	64 GB	4/6 GB	16 MP	16 MP	Android 6.0; ColorOS 3	4000 mAh	
F3 Lite (A57)	October 2017	5.2" HD (720 x 1280 px) IPS LCD	Qualcomm Snapdragon 435	32 GB	3 GB	13 MP	16 MP	Android 6.0; ColorOS 3	2900 mAh	
F5 (A75)	October 2017	6.0" FHD+ (1080 x 2160 px) IPS LCD	MediaTek Helio P23	32/64 GB	4/6 GB	16 MP	20 MP	Android 7.1.1; ColorOS 3.2	3200 mAh	
F5 Plus	October 2017	6.0" FHD+ (1080 x 2160 px) IPS LCD	MediaTek Helio P23	64 GB	6 GB	16 MP	20 MP	Android 7.1.1; ColorOS 3.2	3200 mAh	
F5 Youth (A73)	November 2017	6.0" FHD+ (1080 x 2160 px) IPS LCD	MediaTek Helio P23	32 GB	3/4 GB	13 MP	16 MP	Android 7.1; ColorOS 3.2	3200 mAh	
F7	March 2018	6.23" FHD+ (1080 x 2280 px) IPS LCD	MediaTek Helio P60	64/128 GB	4/6 GB	16 MP	25 MP	Android 8.1; ColorOS 5	3400 mAh	
F7 Youth (A73s / realme 1)	May 2018	6" FHD+ (1080 x 2160 px) IPS LCD	MediaTek Helio P60	64 GB	4 GB	13 MP	8 MP	Android 8.1; ColorOS 5.2	3410 mAh	
F9	August 2018	6.3" FHD+ (1080 x 2340 px) IPS LCD	MediaTek Helio P60	64/128 GB	4/6 GB	16 MP + 2 MP	25 MP	Android 8.1; ColorOS 5.2	3500 mAh	
F9 Pro	August 2018	6.3" FHD+ (1080 x 2340 px) IPS LCD	MediaTek Helio P60	64 GB	6 GB	16 MP + 2 MP	25 MP	Android 8.1; ColorOS 5.2	3500 mAh	
F11	May 2019	6.53" FHD+ (1080 x 2340 px) IPS LCD	MediaTek Helio P70	64/128 GB	4/6 GB	48 MP + 5 MP	16 MP	Android 9 ColorOS 6	4020 mAh	
F11 Pro	May 2019	6.53" FHD+ (1080 x 2340 px) IPS LCD	MediaTek Helio P70	64/128 GB	4/6 GB	48 MP + 5 MP	16 MP	Android 9 ColorOS 6	4000 mAh	
F15 (A91)	16 January 2020	6.4" FHD+ (1080 x 2400 px) AMOLED	Mediatek Helio P70	128 GB	8 GB	48 MP + 8 MP + 2 MP + 2 MP	16 MP	Android 9 ColorOS 6.1	4025 mAh	
F17 (A73 (2020))	2 September 2020	6.44" FHD+ (1080 x 2400 px) Super AMOLED	Qualcomm Snapdragon 662	64/128 GB	4/6/8 GB	16 MP + 8 MP + 2 MP + 2 MP	16 MP	Android 10; ColorOS 7.2	4015 mAh	
F17 Pro (Reno4 Lite)	2 September 2020	6.43" FHD+ (1080 x 2400 px) Super AMOLED	MediaTek Helio P95	128 GB	8 GB	48 MP + 8 MP + 2 MP + 2 MP	16 MP + 2 MP	Android 10; ColorOS 7.2	4015 mAh	
F19 (A74)	1 April 2021	6.43" FHD+ (1080 x 2400 px) AMOLED	Qualcomm Snapdragon 662	128 GB	6 GB	48 MP + 2 MP + 2 MP	16 MP	Android 11; ColorOS 11.1	5000 mAh	
F19s (A95)	27 September 2021	6.43" FHD+ (1080 x 2400 px) AMOLED	Qualcomm Snapdragon 662	128 GB	6 GB	48 MP + 2 MP + 2 MP	16 MP	Android 11; ColorOS 11.1	5000 mAh	
F19 Pro (A94 / Reno5 F / Reno5 Lite)	25 March 2021	6.43" FHD+ (1080 x 2400 px) AMOLED	MediaTek Helio P95	128/256 GB	8 GB	48 MP + 8 MP + 2 MP + 2 MP	16 MP	Android 11; ColorOS 11.1	4310 mAh	
F19 Pro+ 5G	25 March 2021	6.43" FHD+ (1080 x 2400 px) AMOLED	Mediatek Dimensity 800U	128 GB	8 GB	48 MP + 8 MP + 2 MP + 2 MP	16 MP	Android 11; ColorOS 11.1	4310 mAh	
F21 Pro (Reno7)	12 April 2022	6.43" FHD+ (1080 x 2400 px) AMOLED	Qualcomm Snapdragon 680 4G	128/256 GB	6/8 GB	64 MP + 2 MP + 2 MP	32 MP	Android 12; ColorOS 12.1	4500mAh	
F21 Pro 5G (Reno7 Z 5G / Reno 7 Lite / Reno8 Lite)	12 April 2022	6.43" FHD+ (1080 x 2400 px) AMOLED	Qualcomm Snapdragon 695 5G	128 GB	8 GB	64 MP + 2 MP + 2 MP	16 MP	Android 11; ColorOS 12	4500mAh	
F21s Pro (Reno8)	15 September 2022	6.43" FHD+ (1080 x 2400 px) AMOLED	Qualcomm Snapdragon 680 4G	128 GB	8 GB	64 MP + 2 MP + 2 MP	32 MP	Android 12; ColorOS 12.1	4500mAh	
F21s Pro 5G (Reno8 Z)	15 September 2022	6.43" FHD+ (1080 x 2400 px) AMOLED	Qualcomm Snapdragon 695 5G	128 GB	8 GB	64 MP + 2 MP + 2 MP	16 MP	Android 12; ColorOS 12.1	4500mAh	
F23 (A98)	15 May 2023	6.72" 120 Hz FHD+ (1080 x 2400 px) IPS LCD	Qualcomm Snapdragon 695 5G	128/256 GB	8 GB	64 MP + 2 MP + 2 MP	32 MP	Android 13; ColorOS 13.1	5000 mAh	
F25 Pro (Reno11 F)	29 February 2024	6.7" 120 Hz FHD+ (1080 x 2412 px) AMOLED	MediaTek Dimensity 7050	128/256 GB	8 GB	64 MP + 8 MP + 2 MP	32 MP	Android 14; ColorOS 14	5000 mAh	
F27 Pro+ (A3 Pro (China))	13 June 2024	6.7" 120 Hz FHD+ (1080 x 2412 px) AMOLED	MediaTek Dimensity 7050	128/256 GB	8 GB	64 MP + 2 MP	8 MP	Android 14; ColorOS 14	5000 mAh	
F27 (Reno 12F)	20 August 2024	6.67" 120 Hz FHD+ (1080 x 2400 px) AMOLED	MediaTek Dimensity 6300	128/256 GB	8 GB	50 MP + 2 MP	32 MP	Android 14; ColorOS 14	5000 mAh	
F29	27 March 2025	6.7" 120 Hz FHD+ (1080 x 2412 px) AMOLED	Qualcomm Snapdragon 6 Gen 1	128/256 GB	8 GB	50 MP + 2 MP	16 MP	Android 15; ColorOS 15	6500 mAh	
F29 Pro	1 April 2025	6.7" 120 Hz FHD+ (1080 x 2412 px) AMOLED	MediaTek Dimensity 7300 Energy	128/256 GB	8/12 GB	50 MP + 2 MP	16 MP	Android 15; ColorOS 15	6000 mAh	
F31 Pro	16 September 2025	6.57" 120 Hz FHD+ (1080 x 2372 px) AMOLED	MediaTek Dimensity 7300	128/256 GB	8/12 GB	50 MP + 2 MP	32 MP	Android 15; ColorOS 15	7000 mAh	
F31 Pro+	16 September 2025	6.8" 120 Hz FHD+ (1280 x 2800 px) AMOLED	Qualcomm Snapdragon 7 Gen 3	256 GB	8/12 GB	50 MP + 2 MP	32 MP	Android 15; ColorOS 15	7000 mAh	
F33	15 April 2026	6.57" 120 Hz FHD+ (1080 x 2372 px) AMOLED	Mediatek Dimensity 6360 Max	128/256 GB	6/8 GB	50 MP + 2 MP	16 MP	Android 16; ColorOS 16	7000 mAh	
F33 Pro	15 April 2026	6.57" 120 Hz FHD+ (1080 x 2372 px) AMOLED	Mediatek Dimensity 6360 Max	128/256 GB	8 GB	50 MP + 2 MP	50 MP	Android 16; ColorOS 16	7000 mAh	
F35	5 October 2026	6.57" 120 Hz FHD+ (1080 x 2372 px) AMOLED	MediaTek Dimensity 6360 Max	128 GB	6/8 GB	50 MP + 2 MP	50 MP	Android 16; ColorOS 16	8000 mAh	
F35 Pro	5 October 2026	6.78" 120 Hz FHD+ (1272 x 2772 px) AMOLED	MediaTek Dimensity 7360 Max	128/256 GB	6/8 GB	50 MP + 8 MP	50 MP	Android 17; ColorOS 16.5	8000 mAh	

== Oppo A Series ==
The Oppo A series are from budget to entry-level, and mid-range smartphones.

Model	Release date	Display	Chipset	Memory		Rear camera	Front camera	Operating system	Battery
Model	Release date	Display	Chipset	ROM	RAM	Rear camera	Front camera	Operating system	Battery
A31	April 2015	4.5" (480 × 854 px) IPS LCD	Qualcomm Snapdragon 410	8 GB	1 GB	8 MP	5 MP	Android 4.4; ColorOS 2.0	2000 mAh
A33	November 2015	5.0" (540 × 960 px) IPS LCD	Qualcomm Snapdragon 410	16 GB	2 GB	8 MP	5 MP	Android 5.1; ColorOS 2.1	2400 mAh
A53	November 2015	5.5" HD (720 × 1280 px) IPS LCD	Qualcomm Snapdragon 616	16 GB	2 GB	13 MP	5 MP	Android 5.1; ColorOS 2.1	3075 mAh
A30	February 2016	5.0" FHD (1080 × 1920 px) AMOLED	Qualcomm Snapdragon 801	16 GB	3 GB	13 MP	8 MP	Android 5.1; ColorOS 2.1	2525 mAh
A59	June 2016	5.5" HD (720 × 1280 px) IPS LCD	MediaTek MT6750	32 GB	3 GB	13 MP	8 MP	Android 5.1; ColorOS 3	3075 mAh
A37	June 2016	5.0" HD (720 × 1280 px) IPS LCD	Qualcomm Snapdragon 410	16 GB	2 GB	8 MP	5 MP	Android 5.1; ColorOS 3	2630 mAh
A57 (F3 Lite)	November 2016	5.2" HD (720 × 1280 px) IPS LCD	Qualcomm Snapdragon 435	32 GB	3 GB	13 MP	16 MP	Android 6.0; ColorOS 3	2900 mAh
A39	March 2017	5.2" HD (720 × 1280 px) IPS LCD	MediaTek MT6750	32 GB	3 GB	13 MP	5 MP	Android 5.1; ColorOS 3	2900 mAh
A77	May 2017 (MediaTek); July 2017 (Snapdragon)	5.5" FHD (1080 × 1920 px) IPS LCD	MediaTek MT6750T; Qualcomm Snapdragon 625	64 GB	4 GB	13 MP	16 MP	Android 6.0; ColorOS 3 (MediaTek); Android 7.1; ColorOS 3.1 (Snapdragon)	3200 mAh
A71	September 2017	5.2" HD (720 × 1280 px) IPS LCD	MediaTek MT6750	16 GB	3 GB	13 MP	5 MP	Android 7.1; ColorOS 3.1	3000 mAh
A79/A79t	25 November 2017	6.01" FHD+ (1080 × 2160 px) AMOLED	MediaTek Helio P23	64 GB	4 GB	16 MP	16 MP	Android 7.1; ColorOS 3.2	3000 mAh
A73 (F5 Youth)	17 December 2017	6.0" FHD+ (1080 × 2160 px) IPS LCD	MediaTek Helio P23	32 GB	3/4 GB	13 MP	16 MP	Android 7.1; ColorOS 3.2	3200 mAh
A75 (F5)	29 December 2017	6.0" FHD+ (1080 × 2160 px) IPS LCD	MediaTek Helio P23	32 GB	4 GB	16 MP	20 MP	Android 7.1; ColorOS 3.2	3200 mAh
A75s (A79)	29 December 2017	6.0" FHD+ (1080 × 2160 px) IPS LCD	MediaTek Helio P23	64 GB	4 GB	16 MP	20 MP	Android 7.1; ColorOS 3.2	3200 mAh
A83	January 2018	5.7" HD+ (720 × 1440 px) IPS LCD	MediaTek Helio P23	16/32/64 GB	2/3/4 GB	13 MP	8 MP	Android 7.1; ColorOS 3.2	3180 mAh
A85	January 2018	5.7" HD+ (720 × 1440 px) IPS LCD	MediaTek Helio P23	32 GB	4 GB	13 MP	8 MP	Android 7.1; ColorOS 3.2	3090 mAh
A71 (2018) (A71k)	February 2018	5.2" HD (720 × 1280 px) IPS LCD	Qualcomm Snapdragon 450	16 GB	2/3 GB	13 MP	5 MP	Android 7.1.1; ColorOS 3.2	3000 mAh
A71k (A71 (2018))	February 2018	5.2" HD (720 × 1280 px) IPS LCD	Qualcomm Snapdragon 450	16 GB	2 GB	13 MP	5 MP	Android 7.1.1; ColorOS 3.2	3000 mAh
A73s (F7 Youth / realme 1)	20 June 2018	6.0" FHD+ (1080 × 2160 px) IPS LCD	MediaTek Helio P60	64 GB	4 GB	13 MP	8 MP	Android 8.1; ColorOS 5.2	3410 mAh
A1	March 2018	5.7" HD+ (720 × 1440 px) S-IPS LCD	MediaTek Helio P23	32/64 GB	3/4 GB	13 MP	8 MP	Android 7.1.1; ColorOS 3.2	3180 mAh
A3	April 2018	6.2" FHD+ (1080 × 2280 px) IPS LCD	MediaTek Helio P60	128 GB	4 GB	16 MP	8 MP	Android 8.1; ColorOS 5.0	3400 mAh
A5 (AX5 / realme 2)	July 2018	6.2" HD+ (720 × 1520 px) IPS LCD	Qualcomm Snapdragon 450	32/64 GB	3/4 GB	13 MP + 2 MP	8 MP	Android 8.1; ColorOS 5.1	4230 mAh
A3s (A12e / realme C1)	July 2018	6.2" HD+ (720 × 1520 px) IPS LCD	Qualcomm Snapdragon 450	16/32/64 GB	2/3/4 GB	13 MP + 2 MP	8 MP	Android 8.1; ColorOS 5.1	4230 mAh
A7x	September 2018	6.3" FHD+ (1080 × 2340 px) IPS LCD	MediaTek Helio P60	64/128 GB	4 GB	16 MP + 2 MP	16 MP	Android 8.1; ColorOS 5.2	3500 mAh
A7	November 2018	6.2" HD+ (720 × 1520 px) IPS LCD	Qualcomm Snapdragon 450	32/64 GB	3/4 GB	13 MP + 2 MP	16 MP	Android 8.1; ColorOS 5.2	4230 mAh
A5s (AX5s)	18 March 2019	6.2" HD+ (720 × 1520 px) S-IPS LCD	MediaTek Helio P35	32/64 GB	2/3/4 GB	13 MP + 2 MP	8 MP	Android 8.1; ColorOS 5.2	4230 mAh
A7n	April 2019	6.2" HD+ (720 × 1520 px) S-IPS LCD	MediaTek Helio P35	64 GB	4 GB	13 MP + 2 MP	16 MP	Android 8.1; ColorOS 5.2	4230 mAh
A1k	April 2019	6.1" HD+ (720 × 1560 px) IPS LCD	MediaTek Helio P22	32 GB	2/3 GB	8 MP	5 MP	Android 9 ColorOS 6.0	4000 mAh
A9	April 2019	6.53" FHD+ (1080 × 2340 px) IPS LCD	MediaTek Helio P70	128 GB	4/6/8 GB	16 MP + 2 MP	16 MP	Android 9 ColorOS 6.0	4020 mAh
A9x	May 2019	6.53" FHD+ (1080 × 2340 px) IPS LCD	MediaTek Helio P70	128 GB	6 GB	48 MP + 5 MP	16 MP	Android 9 ColorOS 6.0	4020 mAh
A9 (2020)	September 2019	6.5" HD+ (720 × 1600 px) IPS LCD	Qualcomm Snapdragon 665	128 GB	4/8 GB	48 MP + 8 MP + 2 MP + 2 MP	16 MP	Android 9 ColorOS 6.1	5000 mAh
A5 (2020)	September 2019	6.5" HD+ (720 × 1600 px) IPS LCD	Qualcomm Snapdragon 665	32/64/128 GB	3/4/6 GB	12 MP + 8 MP + 2 MP + 2 MP	8 MP	Android 9 ColorOS 6.1	5000 mAh
A8	December 2019	6.5" HD+ (720 × 1600 px) IPS LCD	MediaTek Helio P35	64/128 GB	4 GB	12 MP + 2 MP + 2 MP	8 MP	Android 9 ColorOS 6.1.2	4230 mAh
A11	October 2019	6.5" HD+ (720 × 1600 px) IPS LCD	Qualcomm Snapdragon 665	64/128/256 GB	4/6 GB	12 MP + 8 MP + 2 MP + 2 MP	8 MP	Android 9 ColorOS 6.1	5000 mAh
A31	February 2020	6.5" HD+ (720 × 1600 px) IPS LCD	MediaTek Helio P35	64/128 GB	4/6 GB	12 MP + 2 MP + 2 MP	8 MP	Android 9 ColorOS 6.1.2	4230 mAh
A11k	June 2020	6.22" HD+ (720 x 1520 px) IPS LCD	MediaTek Helio P35	32 GB	2 GB	13 MP + 2 MP	5 MP	Android 9 ColorOS 6.1.2	4230 mAh
A91	20 December 2019	6.4" FHD+ (1080 × 2400 px) AMOLED	MediaTek Helio P70	128/256 GB	4/8 GB	48 MP + 8 MP + 2 MP + 2 MP	16 MP	Android 9 ColorOS 6.1.2	4025 mAh
A11s	27 December 2021	6.5" HD+ (720 × 1600 px) IPS LCD	Qualcomm Snapdragon 460	64/128 GB	4/8 GB	13 MP + 2 MP + 2 MP	8 MP	Android 10; ColorOS 7.2	5000 mAh
A12	20 April 2020	6.22" HD+ (720 × 1520 px) IPS LCD	MediaTek Helio P35	32/64 GB	3/4 GB	13 MP + 2 MP	5 MP	Android 9 ColorOS 6.1.2	4230 mAh
A52	20 April 2020	6.5" FHD+ (1080 × 2400 px) IPS LCD	Qualcomm Snapdragon 665	64/128 GB	4/6 GB	12 MP + 8 MP + 2 MP + 2 MP	16 MP	Android 10; ColorOS 7.1	5000 mAh
A92s	20 April 2020	6.57" FHD+ (1080 × 2400 px) IPS LCD	MediaTek Dimensity 800	128/256 GB	6/8 GB	48 MP + 8 MP + 2 MP + 2 MP	16 MP + 2 MP	Android 10; ColorOS 7.1	4000 mAh
A72	21 April 2020	6.5" FHD+ (1080 × 2400 px) IPS LCD	Qualcomm Snapdragon 665	128 GB	4/8 GB	48 MP + 8 MP + 2 MP + 2 MP	16 MP	Android 10; ColorOS 7.1	5000 mAh
A92	4 May 2020	6.5" FHD+ (1080 × 2400 px) IPS LCD	Qualcomm Snapdragon 665	128 GB	6/8 GB	48 MP + 8 MP + 2 MP + 2 MP	16 MP	Android 10; ColorOS 7.1	5000 mAh
A12s	14 July 2020	6.22" HD+ (720 x 1520 px) IPS LCD	MediaTek Helio P35	32 GB	3 GB	13 MP + 2 MP	5 MP	Android 9 ColorOS 6.1.2	4230 mAh
A72 5G (A53 5G / A73 5G)	27 July 2020	6.5" FHD+ (1080 × 2400 px) IPS LCD	MediaTek Dimensity 720	128 GB	4/6/8 GB	16 MP + 8 MP + 2 MP	8 MP	Android 10; ColorOS 7.2	4040 mAh
A32 (A33 (2020))	10 September 2020	6.5" HD+ (720 × 1600 px) IPS LCD	Qualcomm Snapdragon 460	64/128 GB	4/8 GB	13 MP + 2 MP + 2 MP	8 MP	Android 10; ColorOS 7.2	5000 mAh
A12e (A3s / realme C1)	3 April 2020	6.2" HD+ (720 × 1520 px) IPS LCD	Qualcomm Snapdragon 450	64 GB	3 GB	13 MP + 2 MP	8 MP	Android 8.1; ColorOS 5.2	4230 mAh
A53	20 August 2020	6.5" HD+ (720 × 1600 px) IPS LCD	Qualcomm Snapdragon 460	64/128 GB	4/6 GB	13 MP + 2 MP + 2 MP	16 MP	Android 10; ColorOS 7.2	5000 mAh
A33 (2020) (A32)	28 September 2020	6.5" HD+ (720 × 1600 px) IPS LCD	Qualcomm Snapdragon 460	32 GB	3/4 GB	13 MP + 2 MP + 2 MP	8 MP	Android 10; ColorOS 7.2	5000 mAh
A93	1 October 2020	6.43" FHD+ (1080 × 2400 px) Super AMOLED	MediaTek Helio P95	128 GB	8 GB	48 MP + 8 MP + 2 MP	16 MP	Android 10; ColorOS 7.2	4310 mAh
A53s	12 October 2020	6.5" HD+ (720 × 1600 px) IPS LCD	Qualcomm Snapdragon 460	64/128 GB	4 GB	13 MP + 2 MP + 2 MP	8 MP	Android 10; ColorOS 7.2	5000 mAh
A73 5G (A72 5G)	4 November 2020	6.5" FHD+ (1080 × 2400 px) IPS LCD	MediaTek Dimensity 720	128/265 GB	8 GB	16 MP + 8 MP + 2 MP	8 MP	Android 10; ColorOS 7.2	4040 mAh
A53 5G	18 December 2020	6.5" FHD+ (1080 × 2400 px) IPS LCD	MediaTek Dimensity 720	128 GB	4/6/8 GB	16 MP + 2 MP + 2 MP	8 MP	Android 10; ColorOS 7.2	4040 mAh
A93 (5G)	January 2021	6.5" FHD+ (1080 × 2400 px) IPS LCD	Qualcomm Snapdragon 480 5G	128/265 GB	8 GB	48 MP + 2 MP + 2 MP	8 MP	Android 11; ColorOS 11.1	5000 mAh
A53s 5G	7 May 2021	6.52" HD+ (720 × 1600 px) IPS LCD	MediaTek Dimensity 700	128 GB	6/8 GB	13 MP + 2 MP + 2 MP	8 MP	Android 11; ColorOS 11.1	5000 mAh
A93s (5G)	30 July 2021	6.52" HD+ (720 × 1600 px) IPS LCD	MediaTek Dimensity 700	128/265 GB	8 GB	48 MP + 2 MP + 2 MP	8 MP	Android 11; ColorOS 11.1	5000 mAh
A94	11 March 2021	6.43" FHD+ (1080 × 2400 px) AMOLED	MediaTek Helio P95	128 GB	8 GB	48 MP + 8 MP + 2 MP +2 MP	32 MP	Android 11; ColorOS 11.1	4310 mAh
A54	1 April 2021	6.51" HD+ (720 × 1600 px) IPS LCD	MediaTek Helio P35	64/128 GB	4/6 GB	13 MP + 2 MP + 2 MP	16 MP	Android 10; ColoOS 7.2	5000 mAh
A74 5G	13 April 2021	6.5" FHD+ (1080 x 2400 px) IPS LCD	Qualcomm Snapdragon 480 5G	128 GB	6/8 GB	48 MP + 8 MP + 2 MP + 2 MP	16 MP	Android 11; ColorOS 11.1	5000 mAh
A54 5G	14 April 2021	6.5" FHD+ (1080 x 2400 px) IPS LCD	Qualcomm Snapdragon 480 5G	64/128 GB	4 GB	48 MP + 8 MP + 2 MP + 2 MP	16 MP	Android 11; ColorOS 11.1	5000 mAh
A94 5G	3 May 2021	6.43" FHD+ (1080p × 2400 px) Super AMOLED	MediaTek Dimensity 800U	128 GB	8 GB	48 MP + 8 MP + 2 MP + 2 MP	16 MP	Android 11; ColorOS 11.1	4310 mAh
A74	10 May 2021	6.43" FHD+ (1080 × 2400 px) AMOLED	Qualcomm Snapdragon 662	128 GB	4/6/8 GB	48 MP + 2 MP + 2 MP	16 MP	Android 11; ColorOS 11.1	5000 mAh
A54s	27 October 2021	6.52" HD+ (720 × 1600 px) IPS LCD	MediaTek Helio G35	128 GB	4/8 GB	50 MP + 2 MP + 2 MP	8 MP	Android 11; ColorOS 11.1	5000 mAh
A15	15 October 2020	6.52" HD+ (720 × 1600 px) IPS LCD	MediaTek Helio P35	32 GB	2/3 GB	13 MP + 2 MP + 2 MP	5 MP	Android 10; ColorOS 7.2	4230 mAh
A15s	18 December 2020	6.52" HD+ (720 × 1600 px) IPS LCD	MediaTek Helio P35	64/128 GB	4 GB	13 MP + 2 MP + 2 MP	8 MP	Android 10; ColorOS 7.2	4230 mAh
A55 (5G)	25 January 2021	6.5" HD+ (720 × 1600 px) IPS LCD	MediaTek Dimensity 700	128 GB	4/6/8 GB	13 MP + 2 MP + 2 MP	8 MP	Android 11; ColorOS 11.1	5000 mAh
A35	26 April 2021	6.52" HD+ (720 x 1600 px) IPS LCD	MediaTek Helio P35	64/128 GB	4 GB	13 MP + 2 MP + 2 MP	8 MP	Android 10; ColorOS 7.2	4230 mAh
A95 (5G)	8 May 2021	6.43" FHD+ (1080 × 2400 px) AMOLED	MediaTek Dimensity 800U	128/256 GB	8 GB	48 MP + 8 MP + 2 MP	16 MP	Android 11; ColorOS 11.1	4310 mAh
A55	1 October 2021	6.51" HD+ (720 × 1600 px) IPS LCD	MediaTek Helio G35	64/128 GB	4/6 GB	50 MP + 2 MP + 2 MP	16 MP	Android 11; ColorOS 11.1	5000 mAh
A95	16 November 2021	6.43" FHD+ (1080 × 2400 px) AMOLED	Qualcomm Snapdragon 662	128/256 GB	8 GB	48 MP + 2 MP + 2 MP	16 MP	Android 11; ColorOS 11.1	5000 mAh
A55s	18 April 2022	6.5" HD+ (720 × 1600 px) IPS LCD	MediaTek Dimensity 700	128 GB	6/8 GB	13 MP + 2 MP + 2 MP	8 MP	Android 11; ColorOS 11.1	5000 mAh
A16	7 July 2021	6.52" HD+ (720 × 1600 px) IPS LCD	MediaTek Helio G35	32/64/256 GB	3/4 GB	13 MP + 2 MP + 2 MP	8 MP	Android 11; ColorOS 11.1	5000 mAh
A16s	14 August 2021	6.52" HD+ (720 × 1600 px) IPS LCD	MediaTek Helio G35	64 GB	4 GB	13 MP + 2 MP + 2 MP	8 MP	Android 11; ColorOS 11.1	5000 mAh
A16k	8 November 2021	6.52" HD+ (720 × 1600 px) IPS LCD	MediaTek Helio G35	32/64/128 GB	2/3/4/8 GB	13 MP	5 MP	Android 11; ColorOS 11.1	4230 mAh
A56 (5G)	16 November 2021	6.5" HD+ (720 × 1600 px) IPS LCD	MediaTek Dimensity 700	128 GB	4/6 GB	13 MP + 2 MP + 2 MP	8 MP	Android 11; ColorOS 11.1	5000 mAh
A96 (5G)	12 January 2022	6.43" FHD+ (1080 × 2400 px) AMOLED	Qualcomm Snapdragon 695 5G	128/256 GB	8/12 GB	48 MP + 2 MP	16 MP	Android 11; ColorOS 12	4500 mAh
A36	14 January 2022	6.56" 90 Hz HD+ (720 × 1612 px) IPS LCD	Qualcomm Snapdragon 680 4G	128/256 GB	6/8 GB	13 MP + 2 MP	8 MP	Android 11; ColorOS 11.1	5000 mAh
A76	18 February 2022	6.56" 90 Hz HD+ (720 × 1612 px) IPS LCD	Qualcomm Snapdragon 680 4G	128 GB	4/6 GB	13 MP + 2 MP	8 MP	Android 11; ColorOS 11.1	5000 mAh
A96	16 March 2022	6.59" 90 Hz FHD+ (1080 × 2412 px) IPS LCD	Qualcomm Snapdragon 680 4G	128/256 GB	6/8 GB	50 MP + 2 MP	16 MP	Android 11; ColorOS 11.1	5000 mAh
A16e	24 March 2022	6.52" HD+ (720 × 1600 px) IPS LCD	MediaTek Helio P22	32/64 GB	3/4 GB	13 MP	5 MP	Android 11; ColorOS 11.1	4230 mAh
A56s	5 January 2023	6.56" 90 Hz HD+ (720 × 1612 px) IPS LCD	MediaTek Dimensity 810	128/256 GB	8 GB	13 MP + 2 MP	8 MP	Android 12; ColorOS 12.1	5000 mAh
A57 (5G)	15 April 2022	6.56" 90 Hz HD+ (720 × 1612 px) IPS LCD	MediaTek Dimensity 810	128/256 GB	6/8 GB	13 MP + 2 MP	8 MP	Android 12; ColorOS 12.1	5000 mAh
A57 (2022)	27 May 2022	6.56" 90 Hz HD+ (720 × 1612 px) IPS LCD	MediaTek Helio G35	64/128 GB	3/4 GB	13 MP + 2 MP	8 MP	Android 12; ColorOS 12.1	5000 mAh
A77 5G	1 June 2022	6.56" 90 Hz HD+ (720 × 1612 px) IPS LCD	MediaTek Dimensity 810	64/128 GB	4/6 GB	48 MP + 2 MP	8 MP	Android 12; ColorOS 12.1	5000 mAh
A97	12 July 2022	6.6" FHD+ (1080 × 2408 px) IPS LCD	MediaTek Dimensity 810	256 GB	12 GB	48 MP + 2 MP	12 MP	Android 12; ColorOS 12.1	5000 mAh
A77 (OnePlus Nord N20 SE)	3 August 2022	6.56" 90 Hz HD+ (720 × 1612 px) IPS LCD	MediaTek Helio G35	64/128 GB	3/4 GB	50 MP + 2 MP	8 MP	Android 12; ColorOS 12.1	5000 mAh
A57s	31 August 2022	6.56" HD+ (720 × 1612 px) IPS LCD	MediaTek Helio G35	64/128 GB	4 GB	50 MP + 2 MP	8 MP	Android 12; ColorOS 12.1	5000 mAh
A57e	31 August 2022	6.56" HD+ (720 × 1612 px) IPS LCD	MediaTek Helio G35	64 GB	4 GB	13 MP + 2 MP	8 MP	Android 12; ColorOS 12.1	5000 mAh
A17	27 September 2022	6.56" HD+ (720 × 1612 px) IPS LCD	MediaTek Helio G35	64 GB	3/4 GB	50 MP + 2 MP	5 MP	Android 12; ColorOS 12.1	5000 mAh
A77s	5 October 2022	6.56" 90 Hz HD+ (720 × 1612 px) IPS LCD	Qualcomm Snapdragon 680 4G	128 GB	8 GB	50 MP + 2 MP	8 MP	Android 12; ColorOS 12.1	5000 mAh
A17k	13 October 2022	6.56" HD+ (720 × 1612 px) IPS LCD	MediaTek Helio G35	64 GB	3 GB	8 MP	5 MP	Android 12; ColorOS 12.1	5000 mAh
A58 (5G) (A78 5G)	8 November 2022	6.56" 90 Hz HD+ (720 × 1612 px) IPS LCD	MediaTek Dimensity 700	128/256 GB	6/8 GB	50 MP + 2 MP	8 MP	Android 12; ColorOS 12.1	5000 mAh
A58x (A1x)	15 December 2022	6.56" 90 Hz HD+ (720 × 1612 px) IPS LCD	MediaTek Dimensity 700	128 GB	6/8 GB	13 MP + 2 MP	8 MP	Android 12; ColorOS 12.1	5000 mAh
A78 5G (A58 5G in China)	7 January 2023	6.56" 90 Hz HD+ (720 × 1612 px) IPS LCD	MediaTek Dimensity 700	128/256 GB	4/8 GB	50 MP + 2 MP	8 MP	Android 12; ColorOS 12.1	5000 mAh
A98 (F23)	9 May 2023	6.72" 120 Hz FHD+ (1080 × 2400 px) IPS LCD	Qualcomm Snapdragon 695 5G	256 GB	8 GB	64 MP + 2 MP + 2 MP	32 MP	Android 13; ColorOS 13.1	5000 mAh
A78	10 July 2023	6.43" 90 Hz FHD+ (1080 × 2400 px) IPS LCD	Qualcomm Snapdragon 680 4G	128/256 GB	8 GB	50 MP + 2 MP	8 MP	Android 13; ColorOS 13.1	5000 mAh
A58	26 July 2023	6.72" FHD+ (1080 × 2400 px) IPS LCD	MediaTek Helio G85	128/256 GB	6/8 GB	50 MP + 2 MP	8 MP	Android 13; ColorOS 13.1	5000 mAh
A38	4 September 2023	6.56" 90 Hz HD+ (720 × 1612 px) IPS LCD	MediaTek Helio G85	128 GB	4/6 GB	50 MP + 2 MP	5 MP	Android 13; ColorOS 13.1	5000 mAh
A18	27 September 2023	6.56" 90 Hz HD+ (720 × 1612 px) IPS LCD	MediaTek Helio G85	64/128 GB	4 GB	8 MP + 2 MP	5 MP	Android 13; ColorOS 13.1	5000 mAh
A1 Pro	16 November 2022	6.7" 120 Hz FHD+ (1080 × 2412 px) OLED	Qualcomm Snapdragon 695 5G	128/256 GB	8/12 GB	108 MP + 2 MP	16 MP	Android 13; ColorOS 13	4800 mAh
A1x (A58x)	31 March 2023	6.56" 90 Hz HD+ (720 × 1612 px) IPS LCD	MediaTek Dimensity 700	128 GB	6/8 GB	13 MP + 2 MP	8 MP	Android 12; ColorOS 12.1	5000 mAh
A1	4 April 2023	6.72" 120 Hz FHD+ (1080 × 2400 px) IPS LCD	Qualcomm Snapdragon 695 5G	256 GB	8/12 GB	50 MP + 2 MP	8 MP	Android 13; ColorOS 13.1	5000 mAh
A1s (A2 / A79 5G / OnePlus Nord N30 SE 5G)	16 April 2024	6.72" 90 Hz FHD+ (1080 × 2400 px) IPS LCD	MediaTek Dimensity 6020	256/512 GB	4/8 GB	50 MP + 2 MP	8 MP	Android 13; ColorOS 13.1	5000 mAh
A1i (A2x / A2m)	16 April 2024	6.56" 90 Hz HD+ (720 × 1612 px) IPS LCD	MediaTek Dimensity 6020	256 GB	8/12 GB	13 MP	5 MP	Android 13; ColorOS 13.1	5000 mAh
A2 Pro	15 September 2022	6.7" 120 Hz FHD+ (1080 × 2412 px) AMOLED	MediaTek Dimensity 7050	256/512 GB	8/12 GB	64 MP + 2 MP	8 MP	Android 13; ColorOS 13.1	5000 mAh
A2x (A2m / A1i)	12 October 2023	6.56" 90 Hz HD+ (720 × 1612 px) IPS LCD	MediaTek Dimensity 6020	128/256 GB	6/8 GB	13 MP	5 MP	Android 13; ColorOS 13.1	5000 mAh
A2m (A2x / A1i)	25 October 2023	6.56" 90 Hz HD+ (720 × 1612 px) IPS LCD	MediaTek Dimensity 6020	128/256 GB	4/6/8/12 GB	13 MP	5 MP	Android 13; ColorOS 13.1	5000 mAh
A2 (A1s / A79 5G / OnePlus Nord N30 SE 5G)	3 November 2023	6.72" 90 Hz FHD+ (1080 × 2400 px) IPS LCD	MediaTek Dimensity 6020	256/512 GB	12 GB	50 MP + 2 MP	8 MP	Android 13; ColorOS 13.1	5000 mAh
A79 5G (A2 / A1s in China, OnePlus Nord N30 SE 5G)	27 October 2023	6.72" 90 Hz FHD+ (1080 × 2400 px) IPS LCD	MediaTek Dimensity 6020	128/256 GB	4/8 GB	50 MP + 2 MP	8 MP	Android 13; ColorOS 13.1	5000 mAh
A59 5G	22 December 2023	6.56" 90 Hz HD+ (720 × 1612 px) IPS LCD	MediaTek Dimensity 6020	128 GB	4/6 GB	13 MP + 2 MP	8 MP	Android 13; ColorOS 13.1	5000 mAh
A3 Pro (China) (F27 Pro+ in India)	12 April 2024	6.7" 120 Hz FHD+ (1080 × 2412 px) AMOLED	MediaTek Dimensity 7050	256/512 GB	8/12 GB	64 MP + 2 MP	8 MP	Android 14; ColorOS 14	5000 mAh
A3 Pro (A80)	21 June 2024	6.67" 120 Hz HD+ (720 × 1604 px) IPS LCD	MediaTek Dimensity 6300	128/256 GB	8 GB	50 MP + 2 MP	8 MP	Android 14; ColorOS 14	5100 mAh
A3 5G (China)	2 July 2024	6.7" 120 Hz FHD+ (1080 × 2412 px) AMOLED	Qualcomm Snapdragon 695 5G	256/512 GB	8/12 GB	50 MP + 2 MP	8 MP	Android 14; ColorOS 14	5000 mAh
A3x (China) (K12x in India)	27 July 2024	6.67" 120 Hz HD+ (720 × 1604 px) IPS LCD	MediaTek Dimensity 6300	128/256/512 GB	4/6/8 GB	32 MP + 2 MP	8 MP	Android 14; ColorOS 14	5100 mAh
A3x 5G	2 August 2024	6.67" 120 Hz HD+ (720 × 1604 px) IPS LCD	MediaTek Dimensity 6300	64/128 GB	4 GB	8 MP + Auxiliary lens	5 MP	Android 14; ColorOS 14	5100 mAh
A3 5G (A60 5G)	20 August 2024	6.67" 120 Hz HD+ (720 × 1604 px) IPS LCD	MediaTek Dimensity 6300	128 GB	6 GB	50 MP + Auxiliary lens	5 MP	Android 14; ColorOS 14	5100 mAh
A3x	20 August 2024	6.67" 120 Hz HD+ (720 × 1604 px) IPS LCD	Qualcomm Snapdragon 6s 4G Gen 1	64/128/256 GB	4/6/8 GB	8 MP + Auxiliary lens	5 MP	Android 14; ColorOS 14	5100 mAh
A3 (A40 / A40m / A60 (LATAM))	20 August 2024	6.67" 120 Hz HD+ (720 × 1604 px) IPS LCD	Qualcomm Snapdragon 6s 4G Gen 1	128/256 GB	4/6/8 GB	50 MP + Auxiliary lens	5 MP	Android 14; ColorOS 14	5100 mAh
A60	26 April 2024	6.67" 90 Hz HD+ (720 × 1604 px) IPS LCD	Qualcomm Snapdragon 680 4G	128/256 GB	8 GB	50 MP + 2 MP	8 MP	Android 14; ColorOS 14	5000 mAh
A80 (A3 Pro)	2 September 2024	6.67" 120 Hz HD+ (720 × 1604 px) IPS LCD	MediaTek Dimensity 6300	256 GB	8 GB	50 MP + 2 MP	8 MP	Android 14; ColorOS 14	5100 mAh
A60 5G (A3 5G)	September 2024	6.67" 120 Hz HD+ (720 × 1604 px) IPS LCD	MediaTek Dimensity 6300	128 GB	4 GB	50 MP + Auxiliary lens	5 MP	Android 14; ColorOS 14	5100 mAh
A40 (A3)	October 2024	6.67" 120 Hz HD+ (720 × 1604 px) IPS LCD	Qualcomm Snapdragon 6s 4G Gen 1	128/256 GB	4 GB	50 MP + Auxiliary lens	5 MP	Android 14; ColorOS 14	5100 mAh
A40m / A60 (LATAM) (A3)	October 2024	6.67" 120 Hz HD+ (720 × 1604 px) IPS LCD	Qualcomm Snapdragon 6s 4G Gen 1	256 GB	8 GB	50 MP + Auxiliary lens	5 MP	Android 14; ColorOS 14	5100 mAh
A5 Pro (China)	27 December 2024	6.7" 120 Hz FHD+ (1080 × 2412 px) AMOLED	MediaTek Dimensity 7300	256/512 GB	8/12 GB	50 MP + 2 MP	16 MP	Android 15; ColorOS 15	6000 mAh
A5 Pro	25 February 2025	6.67" 120 Hz HD+ (720 × 1604 px) IPS LCD	MediaTek Dimensity 6300	128/256 GB	6/8/12 GB	50 MP + 2 MP	8 MP	Android 15; ColorOS 15	5800 mAh
A5 Pro 4G	17 March 2025	6.67" 90 Hz HD+ (720 × 1604 px) IPS LCD	Qualcomm Snapdragon 6s 4G Gen 1	128/256 GB	8 GB	50 MP + 2 MP	8 MP	Android 15; ColorOS 15	5800 mAh
A5 Energy	21 March 2025	6.67" 90 Hz HD+ (720 × 1604 px) IPS LCD	MediaTek Dimensity 6300	256/512 GB	8/12 GB	50 MP + 2 MP	8 MP	Android 15; ColorOS 15	5800 mAh
A5 (China)	26 March 2025	6.7" 120 Hz FHD+ (1080 × 2412 px) AMOLED	Qualcomm Snapdragon 6 Gen 1	128/256/512 GB	8/12 GB	50 MP + 2 MP	8 MP	Android 15; ColorOS 15	6500 mAh
A5x 4G	15 May 2025	6.67" 90 Hz HD+ (720 × 1604 px) IPS LCD	Qualcomm Snapdragon 6s 4G Gen1	64/128 GB	4/6/8 GB	32 MP	5 MP	Android 15; ColorOS 15	6000 mAh
A5 4G	15 May 2025	6.67" 90 Hz HD+ (720 × 1604 px) IPS LCD	Qualcomm Snapdragon 6s 4G Gen1	128/256 GB	4/6/8 GB	50 MP + 2 MP	5 MP	Android 15; ColorOS 15	6000 mAh
A5 (A6i (China))	15 May 2025	6.67" 120 Hz HD+ (720 × 1604 px) IPS LCD	MediaTek Dimensity 6300	128/256 GB	4/6/8 GB	50 MP + 2 MP	8 MP	Android 15; ColorOS 15	6000 mAh
A5x	25 May 2025	6.67" 120 Hz HD+ (720 × 1604 px) IPS LCD	MediaTek Dimensity 6300	64/128 GB	4/6 GB	32 MP	5 MP	Android 15; ColorOS 15	6000 mAh
A6 Max (A6L)	1 September 2025	6.8" 120 Hz 1280 × 2800 px AMOLED	Qualcomm Snapdragon 7 Gen 3	256 GB	8 GB	50 MP + 2 MP	32 MP	Android 15; ColorOS 15	7000 mAh
A6 GT	9 September 2025	6.8" 120 Hz 1280 × 2800 px AMOLED	Qualcomm Snapdragon 7 Gen 3	256/512 GB	8/12 GB	50 MP + 2 MP	32 MP	Android 15; ColorOS 15	7000 mAh
A6 Pro (China)	12 September 2025	6.57" 120 Hz FHD+ (1080 x 2372 px) AMOLED	MediaTek Dimensity 7300	256/512 GB	8/12/16 GB	50 MP + 2 MP	16 MP	Android 15; ColorOS 15	7000 mAh
A6 Pro	23 September 2025	6.57" 120 Hz FHD+ (1080 x 2372 px) AMOLED	MediaTek Helio G100	128/256 GB	8 GB	50 MP + 2 MP	16 MP	Android 15; ColorOS 15	7000 mAh
A6 Pro 5G	29 September 2025	6.57" 120 Hz FHD+ (1080 x 2372 px) AMOLED	MediaTek Dimensity 6300	128/256 GB	6/8/12 GB	50 MP + 2 MP	16 MP	Android 15; ColorOS 15	7000 mAh
A6x (A6t, A6c in China)	2 December 2025	6.75" 120 Hz HD+ (720 × 1570 px) IPS LCD	Qualcomm Snapdragon 685	64/128/256 GB	4/6 GB	13 MP + QVGA	5 MP	Android 15; ColorOS 15	6500 mAh
A6x 5G (India)	2 December 2025	6.75" 120 Hz HD+ (720 × 1570 px) IPS LCD	MediaTek Dimensity 6300	64/128/256 GB	4/6 GB	13 MP + QVGA	5 MP	Android 15; ColorOS 15	6500 mAh
A6 Pro 5G (India)	5 January 2026	6.75" 120 Hz HD+ (720 × 1570 px) IPS LCD	MediaTek Dimensity 6300	128/256 GB	8 GB	50 MP + 2 MP	16 MP	Android 15; ColorOS 15	7000 mAh
A6s	9 January 2026	6.75" 120 Hz HD+ (720 × 1570 px) IPS LCD	Qualcomm Snapdragon 685	128/256 GB	8 GB	50 MP + 2 MP	16 MP	Android 15; ColorOS 15	7000 mAh
A6s 5G	13 January 2026	6.75" 120 Hz HD+ (720 × 1570 px) IPS LCD	MediaTek Dimensity 6300	128/256 GB	6/8 GB	50 MP + 2 MP	16 MP	Android 15; ColorOS 15	7000 mAh
A6x 5G	13 January 2026	6.75" 120 Hz HD+ (720 × 1570 px) IPS LCD	MediaTek Dimensity 6300	128/256 GB	4/6/8 GB	50 MP + 2 MP	5 MP	Android 15; ColorOS 15	6500 mAh
A6	13 January 2026	6.75" 120 Hz HD+ (720 × 1570 px) IPS LCD	Qualcomm Snapdragon 685	128/256 GB	4/6/8 GB	50 MP + 2 MP	8 MP	Android 15; ColorOS 15	7000 mAh
A6 5G	13 January 2026	6.75" 120 Hz HD+ (720 × 1570 px) IPS LCD	MediaTek Dimensity 6300	128/256 GB	6/8/12 GB	50 MP + 2 MP	8 MP	Android 15; ColorOS 15	7000 mAh
A6t (A6x, A6c in China)	13 January 2026	6.75" 120 Hz HD+ (720 × 1570 px) IPS LCD	Qualcomm Snapdragon 685	64/128 GB	4/6 GB	13 MP + QVGA	5 MP	Android 15; ColorOS 15	6500 mAh
A6t 5G	13 January 2026	6.75" 120 Hz HD+ (720 × 1570 px) IPS LCD	MediaTek Dimensity 6300	128/256 GB	4/6/8 GB	50 MP + 2 MP	5 MP	Android 15; ColorOS 15	6500 mAh
A6t Pro	13 January 2026	6.75" 120 Hz HD+ (720 × 1570 px) IPS LCD	Qualcomm Snapdragon 685	128 GB	8 GB	50 MP + 2 MP	8 MP	Android 15; ColorOS 15	7000 mAh
A6c (China) (A6x, A6t)	15 January 2026	6.75" 120 Hz HD+ (720 × 1570 px) IPS LCD	Qualcomm Snapdragon 685	128 GB	6 GB	13 MP + QVGA	5 MP	Android 15; ColorOS 15	6500 mAh
A6s Pro	3 March 2026	6.57" 120 Hz FHD+ (1080 × 2372 px) AMOLED	MediaTek Helio G100 Max	256 GB	8 GB	50 MP + 2 MP	50 MP	Android 16; ColorOS 16	7000 mAh
A6s 5G (India)	18 March 2026	6.75" 120 Hz HD+ (720 × 1570 px) IPS LCD	MediaTek Dimensity 6300	128 GB	4/6 GB	50 MP + 2 MP	5 MP	Android 15; ColorOS 15	6500 mAh
A6k (K14 in India)	7 April 2026	6.75" 120 Hz HD+ (720 × 1570 px) IPS LCD	MediaTek Dimensity 6300	256 GB	8/12 GB	50 MP + 2 MP	8 MP	Android 15; ColorOS 15	7000 mAh
A6c	7 April 2026	6.75" 120 Hz HD+ (720 × 1570 px) IPS LCD	Unisoc T7250	64/128 GB	4 GB	13 MP + QVGA	5 MP	Android 15; ColorOS 15	7000 mAh
A6s Pro 5G	17 April 2026	6.57" 120 Hz FHD+ (1080 × 2372 px) AMOLED	MediaTek Dimensity 6360 Max	128/256/512 GB	8/12 GB	50 MP + 2 MP	16 MP	Android 16; ColorOS 16	7000 mAh
A7 Pro Max	07 August 2026	6.78" 120 Hz FHD+ (1272 × 2772 px) AMOLED	Qualcomm Snapdragon 4 Gen 5	128/256/512 GB	6/8/12 GB	50 MP + 2 MP	50 MP	Android 16; ColorOS 16	10000 mAh
A7 Pro	11 September 2026	6.57" 120 Hz FHD+ (1080 × 2372 px) AMOLED	MediaTek Dimensity 6360 Max	256 GB	6/8 GB	50 MP + 2 MP	8 MP	Android 16; ColorOS 16	8000 mAh

== Oppo Find Series ==
Release timeline
2011	Oppo Find Me
2012	Oppo Finder
2013	Oppo Find 5
2013	Oppo Find Muse (R821T)
2014	Oppo Find 5 Mini
2014	Oppo Find 7
2014	Oppo Find 7a
2015
2016
2017
2018	Oppo Find X
2019
2020	Oppo Find X2
2020	Oppo Find X2 Pro
2020	Oppo Find X2 Neo
2020	Oppo Find X2 Lite
2021	Oppo Find X3
2021	Oppo Find X3 Pro
2021	Oppo Find X3 Neo
2021	Oppo Find X3 Lite
2021	Oppo Find N
2022	Oppo Find X5
2022	Oppo Find X5 Pro
2022	Oppo Find X5 Lite
2022	Oppo Find N2
2022	Oppo Find N2 Flip
2023	Oppo Find X6
2023	Oppo Find X6 Pro
2023	Oppo Find N3
2023	Oppo Find N3 Flip
2024	Oppo Find X7
2024	Oppo Find X7 Ultra
2024	Oppo Find X8
2024	Oppo Find X8 Pro
2025	Oppo Find N5
2025	Oppo Find X8s
2025	Oppo Find X8s+
2025	Oppo Find X8 Ultra
2025	Oppo Find X9
2025	Oppo Find X9 Pro
2026	Oppo Find N6
2026	Oppo Find X9s
2026	Oppo Find X9s Pro
2026	Oppo Find X9 Ultra

=== Find 5 ===
The Oppo Find 5 was released in America in February 2013. It featured clean lines, a thin rectangular shape, and an overall elegant appearance. The Oppo Find 5 had a pixel density of 441 ppm, which puts it in the highest range of the mobile phones with HD display at its release time. In July 2013, a refreshed Oppo Find 5 launched in China. The processor has been changed to Snapdragon 600 instead of the Snapdragon S4 Pro. The Android version was updated to Android 4.2.2 as well while other specifications remained the same.

=== Find 7 ===
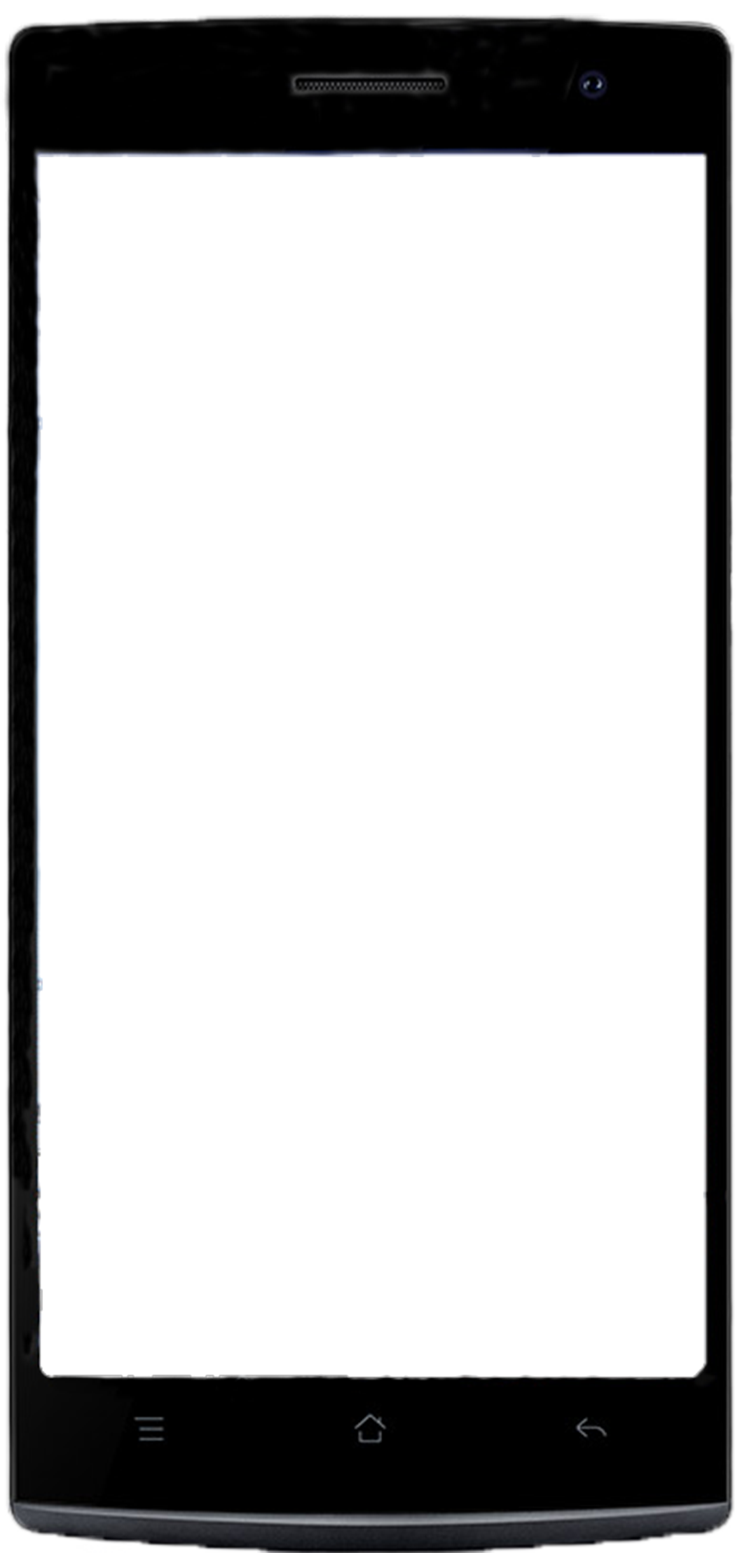
Oppo Find 7

The Oppo Find 7 is a phablet with 3 GB of RAM and a 2.5 GHz Quad-Core processor. The Oppo Find 7 is also available in another variant called the Find 7a, which has a 1080p screen and 2 GB of RAM compared to the Find 7, which sports higher specs. It was announced on 19 March 2014 and released in April 2014. It is similar in design to the OnePlus One released in April 2014.

=== Find X ===
The Oppo Find X was launched on 19 June 2018 at Paris. The Find X features a design that is different from traditional smartphone designs. A pop up camera allows it to be a full screen smartphone with minimal bezels. It is powered by Qualcomm Snapdragon 845 processor and it operates on Android 8.1 (Oreo) with ColorOS 5.1.

=== Find X2 ===
The Oppo Find X2 & X2 Pro were launched globally on 6 March 2020, featuring the Qualcomm Snapdragon 865 processor, 65W SuperVOOC 2.0 Flash Charge, and on the Find X2 Pro, 10X hybrid zoom.

Model	Release date	Display	Chipset	Memory		Rear camera	Front camera	Battery	Fast charging
Model	Release date	Display	Chipset	ROM	RAM	Rear camera	Front camera	Battery	Fast charging
Find X2 Lite	21 May 2020	6.4" Full HD+ (2400 × 1080 px) AMOLED	Qualcomm Snapdragon 765G	128 GB	8 GB	48 MP + 8 MP + 2 × 2 MP	32 MP	4025 mAh	30W VOOC 4.0
Find X2 Neo	21 May 2020	6.5" Full HD+ (2400 × 1080 px) 90 Hz AMOLED	Qualcomm Snapdragon 765G	256 GB	12 GB	48 MP + 13 MP + 8 MP + 2 MP	44 MP	4025 mAh	30W VOOC 4.0
Find X2	6 March 2020	6.7" Quad HD+ (3168 × 1440 px) 120 Hz AMOLED	Qualcomm Snapdragon 865	128/256 GB	8/12 GB	48 MP + 13 MP + 12 MP	32 MP	4200 mAh	65W SuperVOOC 2.0
Find X2 Pro	6 March 2020	6.7" Quad HD+ (3168 × 1440 px) 120 Hz AMOLED	Qualcomm Snapdragon 865	256/512 GB	12 GB	2 × 48 MP + 13 MP	32 MP	4260 mAh	65W SuperVOOC 2.0

=== Find X3 ===
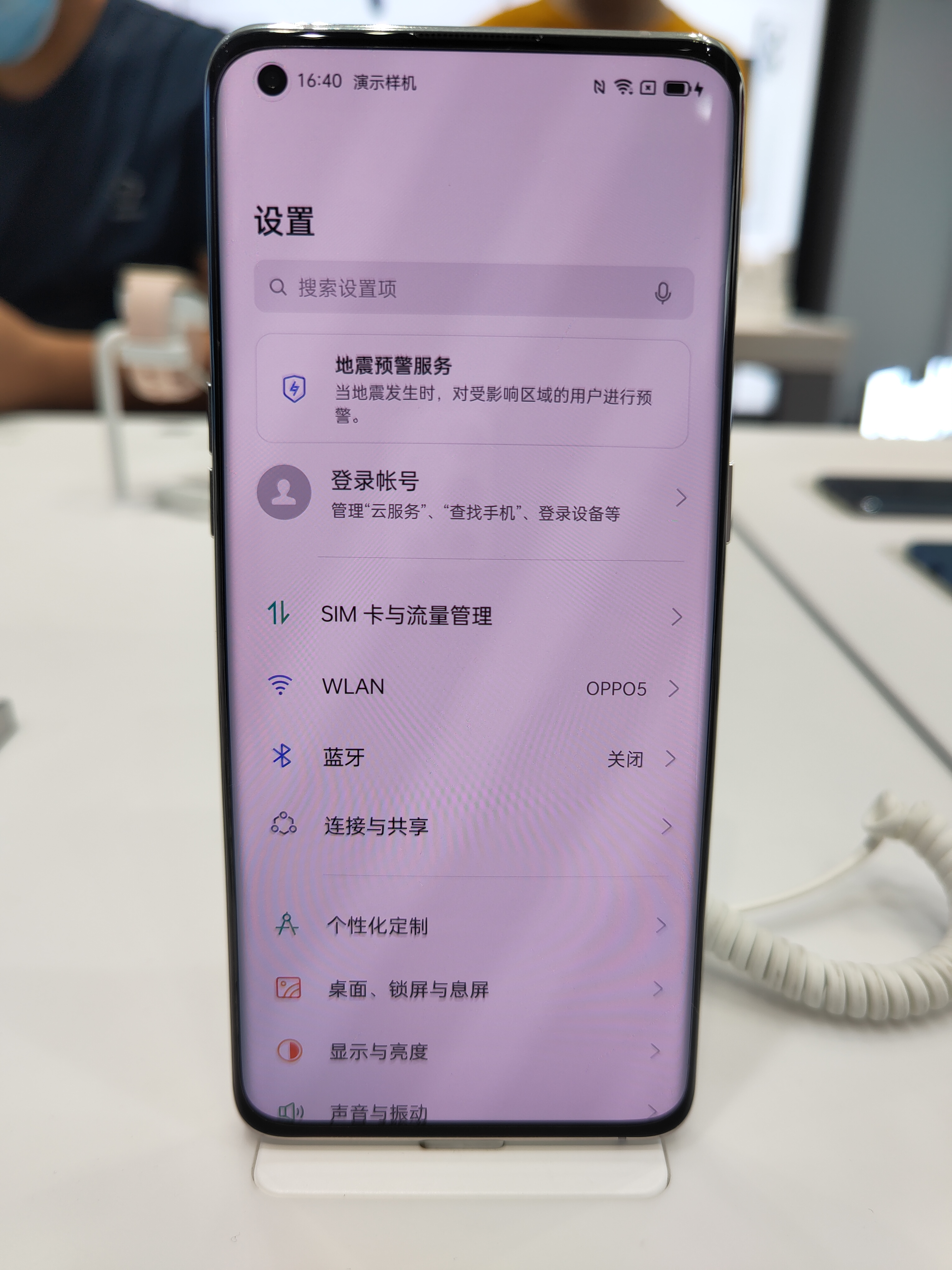
Oppo Find X3

Model	Release date	Display	Chipset	Memory		Rear camera	Front camera	Battery	Fast charging
Model	Release date	Display	Chipset	ROM	RAM	Rear camera	Front camera	Battery	Fast charging
Find X3 Lite (Oppo Reno 5 5G)	March 2021	6.43" Full HD+ (2400×1080 px) 90 Hz AMOLED	Qualcomm Snapdragon 765G	128 GB	8 GB	64 MP (wide) 8 MP (ultrawide) 2x 2 MP (macro/depth)	32 MP	4300 mAh	65 W SuperVOOC 2.0
Find X3 Neo (Oppo Reno 5 Pro+ 5G)	March 2021	6.55" Full HD+ (2400×1080 px) 90 Hz AMOLED	Qualcomm Snapdragon 865	256 GB	12 GB	50 MP (wide) 16 MP (ultrawide) 13 MP (telephoto) 2 MP (macro)	32 MP	4500 mAh	65 W SuperVOOC 2.0
Find X3	March 2021	6.7" Quad HD+ (3216×1440 px) 120 Hz AMOLED	Qualcomm Snapdragon 870	128/256 GB	8 GB	50 MP (wide) 50 MP (ultrawide) 13 MP (telephoto) 3 MP (macro)	32 MP	4500 mAh	65 W SuperVOOC 2.0; 30 W Wireless
Find X3 Pro	March 2021	6.7" Quad HD+ (3216×1440 px) 120 Hz AMOLED	Qualcomm Snapdragon 888	256 GB	8/12 GB	50 MP (wide) 50 MP (ultrawide) 13 MP (telephoto) 3 MP (macro)	32 MP	4500 mAh	65 W SuperVOOC 2.0; 30 W Wireless

=== Find N ===
The Oppo Find N was released in December 2021. It was the world's first foldable with a creaseless display and with no gap. It also followed the footsteps of Samsung, with its ultra-thin-glass display on the main screen.

Model	Release date	Display	Chipset	Memory		Rear camera	Front camera	Battery	Fast charging
Model	Release date	Display	Chipset	ROM	RAM	Rear camera	Front camera	Battery	Fast charging
Find N	December 2021	(folded) 5.49" 988×1972 px 60 Hz AMOLED (unfolded) 7.1" 1792×1920 120 Hz AMOLED	Qualcomm Snapdragon 888	256/512 GB	8/12 GB	50 MP (wide) 16 MP (ultrawide) 13 MP (Telephoto)	32 MP (both front cameras)	4500 mAh	33 W (wired), 15 W (wireless), 10 W (reverse wireless charging)
Find N2	December 2022	(folded) 5.54" FHD+ (1080×2120 px) 120 Hz AMOLED (unfolded) 7.1" 1792×1920 120 Hz LTPO AMOLED	Qualcomm Snapdragon 8+ Gen 1 (4 nm)	256/512 GB	12/16 GB	50 MP (wide) 32 MP (Telephoto) 48 MP (ultrawide)	32 MP (both front cameras)	4520 mAh	67 W (wired), 10 W (reverse wired)
Find N2 Flip	December 2022	(folded) 3.26" 382×720 px 60 Hz AMOLED (unfolded) 6.8" FHD+ (1080×2520 px) 120 Hz LTPO AMOLED	MediaTek Dimensity 9000+	256/512 GB	8/12/16 GB	50 MP (wide) 8 MP (ultrawide)	32 MP	4300 mAh	44 W (wired)
Find N3 (OnePlus Open)	November 2023	(folded) 7.82" QHD+ (2268x2440 px) 120 Hz LTPO AMOLED	Qualcomm Snapdragon 8 Gen 2 (4 nm)	512 GB/1 TB	12/16 GB	48 MP (wide) 64 MP (Telephoto) 48 MP (ultrawide)	32 MP (both front cameras)	4805 mAh	67 W (wired)
Find N3 Flip	August 2023	(folded) 3.26" 382×720 px 60 Hz AMOLED (unfolded) 6.8" FHD+ (1080×2520 px) 120 Hz LTPO AMOLED	MediaTek Dimensity 9200	256/512 GB	12 GB	50 MP (wide) 32 MP (Telephoto) 48 MP (ultrawide)	32 MP	4300 mAh	44 W (wired)

=== Find X5 ===
The Find X4 was skipped to the Find X5 as the number 4 in Chinese sounds like 'death'. The Find X5 Series was released on 24 February 2022. The Oppo Find X5 reuses the Snapdragon 888 chipset from 2021 while Find X5 Pro has the new Snapdragon 8 Gen 1 chipset (In China, the pro model uses Mediatek dimensity 9000 processor.) Both phones have no micro lens which was found on previous Find X3 phones (excluding Find X3 Lite and Neo models). An affordable version was also released, the Find X5 Lite aka Oppo Reno 7 5G. It has the same selfie camera, has microsd and a headphone jack that the flagship brothers do not have but has no stereo speaker, no telephoto lens and no wireless charging.

Model	Release date	Display	Chipset	Memory		Rear camera	Front camera	Battery	Fast charging
Model	Release date	Display	Chipset	ROM	RAM	Rear camera	Front camera	Battery	Fast charging
Find X5 Lite (Oppo Reno 7 5G)	February 2022	6.43" FHD+ (2400×1080 px) 90 Hz AMOLED	MediaTek Dimensity 900	256 GB	8 GB	64 MP (wide) 8 MP (ultrawide) 2 MP (macro)	32 MP (wide)	4500 mAh	65 W SuperVOOC 2.0
Find X5	February 2022	6.55" FHD+ (2400×1080 px) 120 Hz AMOLED	Qualcomm Snapdragon 888	128/256 GB	8 GB/12 GB	50 MP (wide) 50 MP (ultrawide) 13 MP (telephoto)	32 MP (wide)	4800 mAh	80 W SuperVOOC 3.0; 30 W Wireless
Find X5 Pro	February 2022	6.7" QHD (3216×1440 px) 120 Hz AMOLED	Qualcomm Snapdragon 8 Gen 1	256 GB/512 GB	8 GB/12 GB	50 MP (wide) 50 MP (ultrawide) 13 MP (telephoto)	32 MP (wide)	5000 mAh	80 W SuperVOOC 3.0; 50 W Wireless

=== Find X6 ===
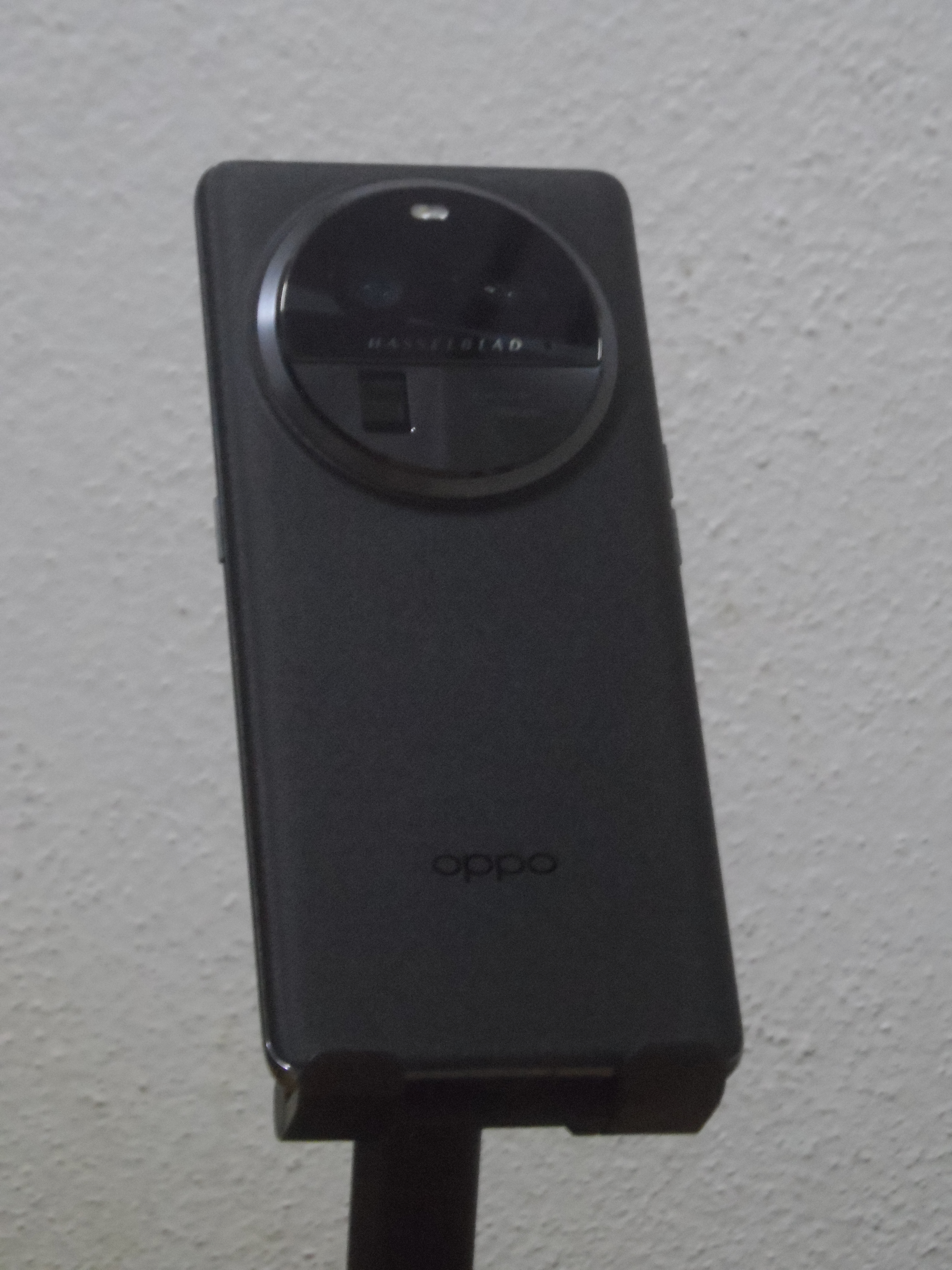
Oppo Find X6 Pro

The Oppo Find X6 & X6 Pro were launched in mainland China on 21 March 2023, the only market where this series is available for sale.

The Oppo Find X6 Pro utilises the Qualcomm Snapdragon 8 Gen 2, the highest specced Snapdragon chip in 2023. It features 5000 mAh battery capacity, an upgraded 100W SuperVOOC wired charging technology, and a triple lens setup headlined by the 1-inch type Sony IMX989 main sensor and Sony IMX890 sensors for both the ultrawide and the 2.8x-periscope telephoto lenses. The periscope telephoto lens is also capable of near-lossless 6 × hybrid zoom.

The Find X6 is powered by the MediaTek Dimensity 9200, with a battery capacity of 5000 mAh. Its triple lens setup also uses 50 MP sensors for all three lenses, but slightly downgrades the main and ultrawide sensors to the Sony IMX989 and ISOCELL JN1 respectively.

Both phones are also equipped with custom-made MariSilicon X image processing NPU and software-based tuning co-developed with Hasselblad.

Model	Release date	Display	Chipset	Memory		Rear camera	Front camera	Battery	Fast charging
Model	Release date	Display	Chipset	ROM	RAM	Rear camera	Front camera	Battery	Fast charging
Find X6	21 March 2023	6.74" FHD+ (2772 × 1240 px) 120 Hz AMOLED	MediaTek Dimensity 9200	256/512 GB	12/16 GB	50 MP + 50 MP + 50 MP	32 MP	4800 mAh	80W SuperVOOC
Find X6 Pro	21 March 2023	6.82" Quad HD+ (3168 × 1440 px) 120 Hz AMOLED	Qualcomm Snapdragon 8 Gen 2	256/512 GB	12/16 GB	50 MP + 50 MP + 50 MP	32 MP	5000 mAh	100W SuperVOOC

=== Find X7 ===
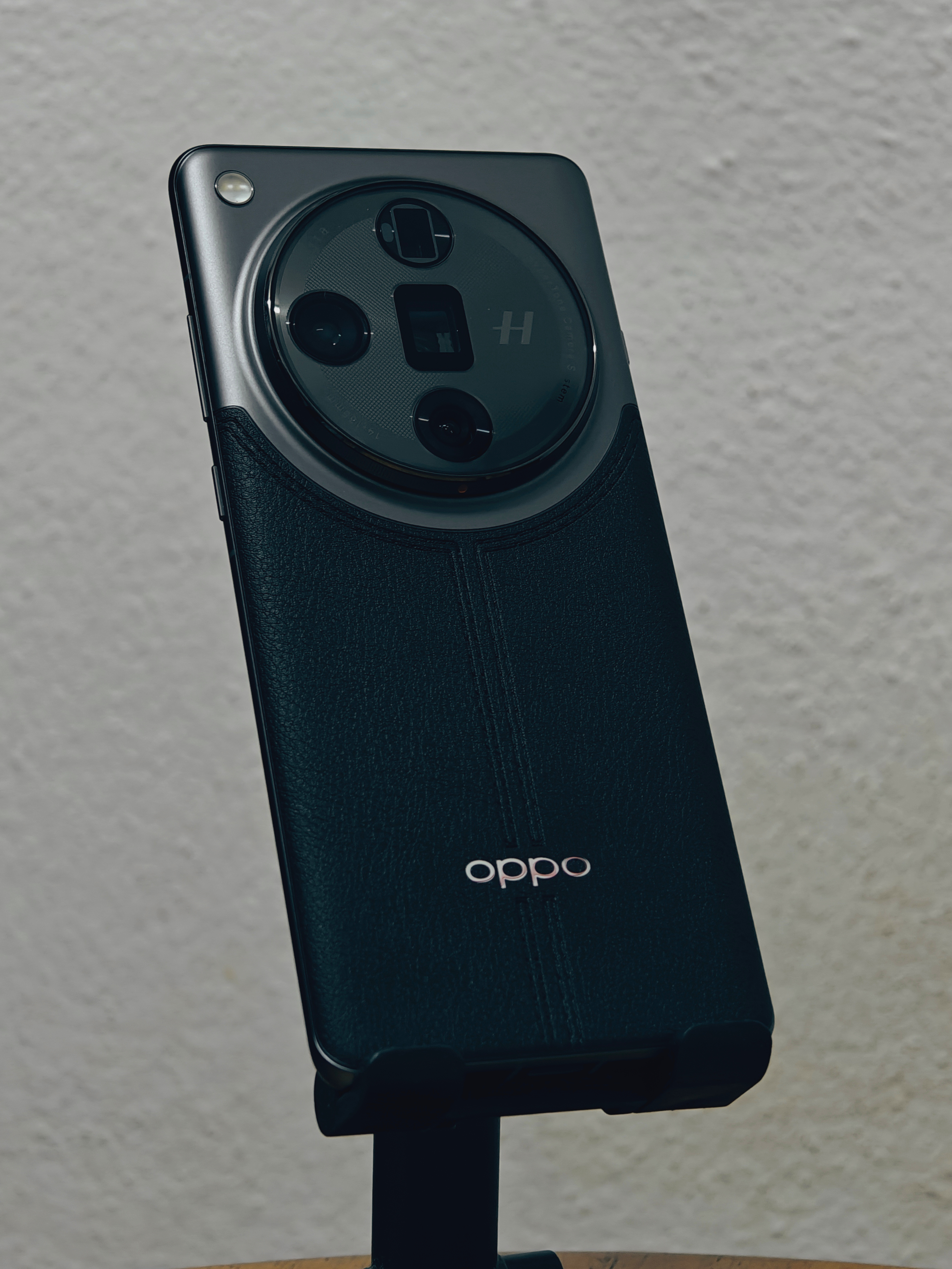
Oppo Find X7 Ultra

The Oppo Find X7 & X7 Ultra were launched exclusively in mainland China on 8 January 2024.

Touted as the first "Ultra" phone in the flagship Find X series, the Find X7 Ultra features a quad-camera setup that includes two periscope telephoto lenses, making it the first smartphone of its kind. Oppo claimed that this quad-camera system is capable of covering between 14mm to 270mm equivalent focal lengths. The phone is powered by the Qualcomm Snapdragon 8 Gen 3, the highest specced Snapdragon chip in 2024.

The Find X7 is powered by the MediaTek Dimensity 9300. Its triple lens setup uses a 50 MP main sensor, a 50 MP ultrawide sensor and a 64 MP periscope telephoto lens capable of 3 × optical zoom. Both phones are also equipped with software-based tuning co-developed with Hasselblad, as well as purported enhancements in computational photography.

Model	Release date	Display	Chipset	Memory		Rear camera	Front camera	Battery	Fast charging
Model	Release date	Display	Chipset	ROM	RAM	Rear camera	Front camera	Battery	Fast charging
Find X7	8 January 2024	6.78" FHD+ (2780 × 1274 px) 120 Hz AMOLED	MediaTek Dimensity 9300	256/512 GB/1TB	12/16 GB	50 MP + 50 MP + 64 MP	32 MP	5000 mAh	100W SuperVOOC
Find X7 Ultra	8 January 2024	6.82" Quad HD+ (3168 × 1440 px) 120 Hz AMOLED	Qualcomm Snapdragon 8 Gen 3	256/512 GB	12/16 GB	50 MP + 50 MP + 50 MP + 50 MP	32 MP	5000 mAh	100W SuperVOOC

=== Find X8 and X8 Pro ===
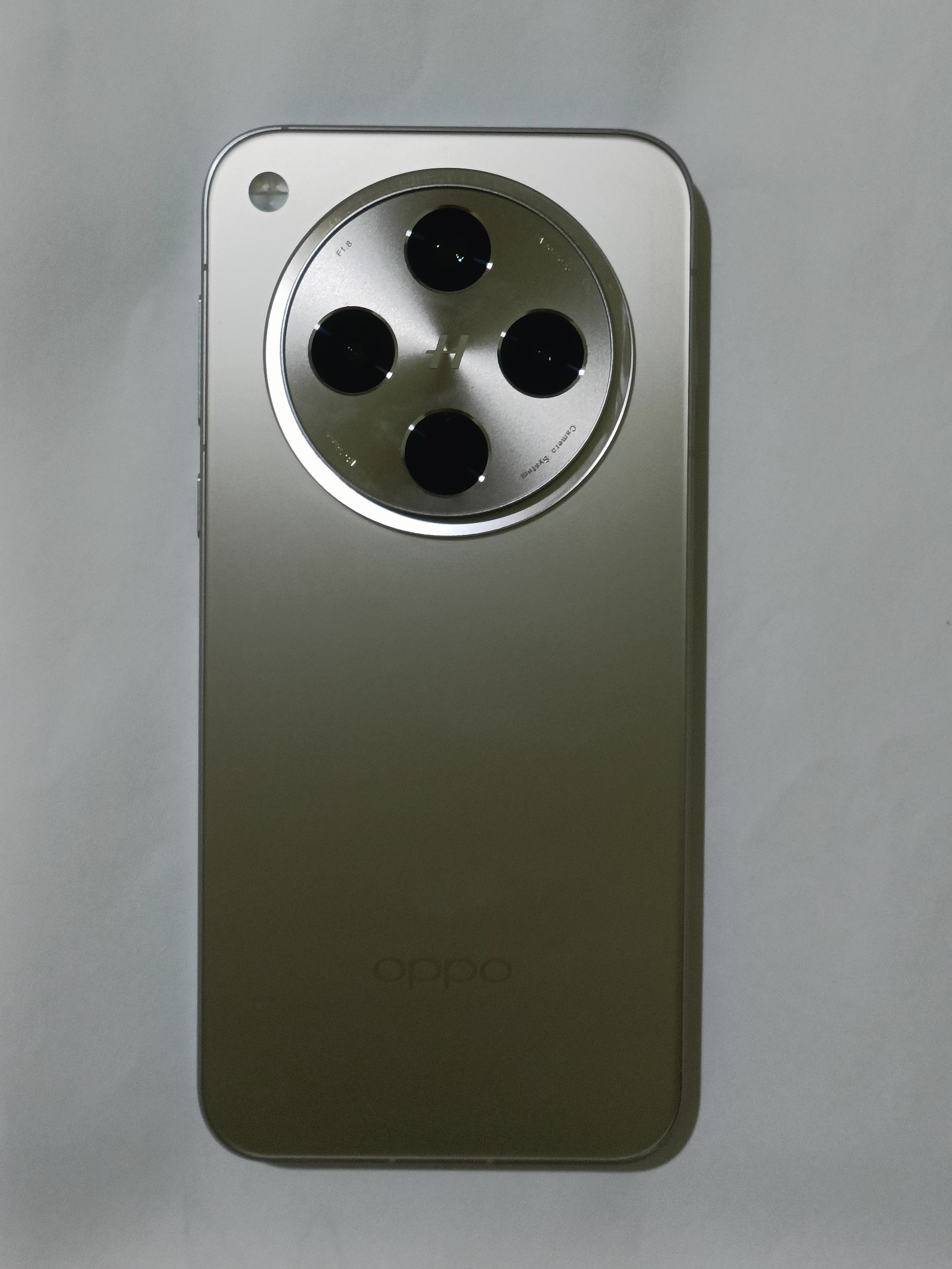
Oppo Find X8

The Oppo Find X8 & X8 Pro was released on 21 November 2024.

With a 1.5K 120 Hz LTPO AMOLED display, an IP68 + IP69 rating, and a huge 5910 mAh battery that is bigger than the Find X7 Ultra, this phone is the first in India to feature the MediaTek Dimensity 9400 SoC.

This time, Oppo chose to adopt the MediaTek chipset, which includes the most recent MediaTek Dimensity 9400. The CPU of the X8 and X8 Pro is same. The powerful Immortalis G925 GPU is included with the X8 Pro.

The price of the Oppo Find X8 Pro, which will come in a single 16GB RAM + 512GB storage configuration, is Rs 99,999. In the meanwhile, there will be two RAM and storage options for the standard Oppo Find X8: 12GB + 256GB and 16GB + 512GB. These will retail for Rs 69,999 and Rs 79,999, respectively.

Model	Release date	Display	Chipset	Memory		Rear camera	Front camera	Battery	Fast charging
Model	Release date	Display	Chipset	ROM	RAM	Rear camera	Front camera	Battery	Fast charging
Find X8	21 November 2024	6.59 inches" 1256 x 2760 pixels 120 Hz AMOLED	MediaTek Dimensity 9400	256/512 GB/1TB	12/16 GB	50 MP + 50 MP + 50 MP +	32 MP	5630 mAh	80W wired
Find X8 Pro	21 November 2024	6.78 inches, (1264 x 2780 pixel) 120 Hz AMOLED	MediaTek Dimensity 9400	256/512 GB	12/16 GB	50 MP + 50 MP + 50 MP + 50 MP	32 MP	5910 mAh	80W wired

=== Find X9 ===
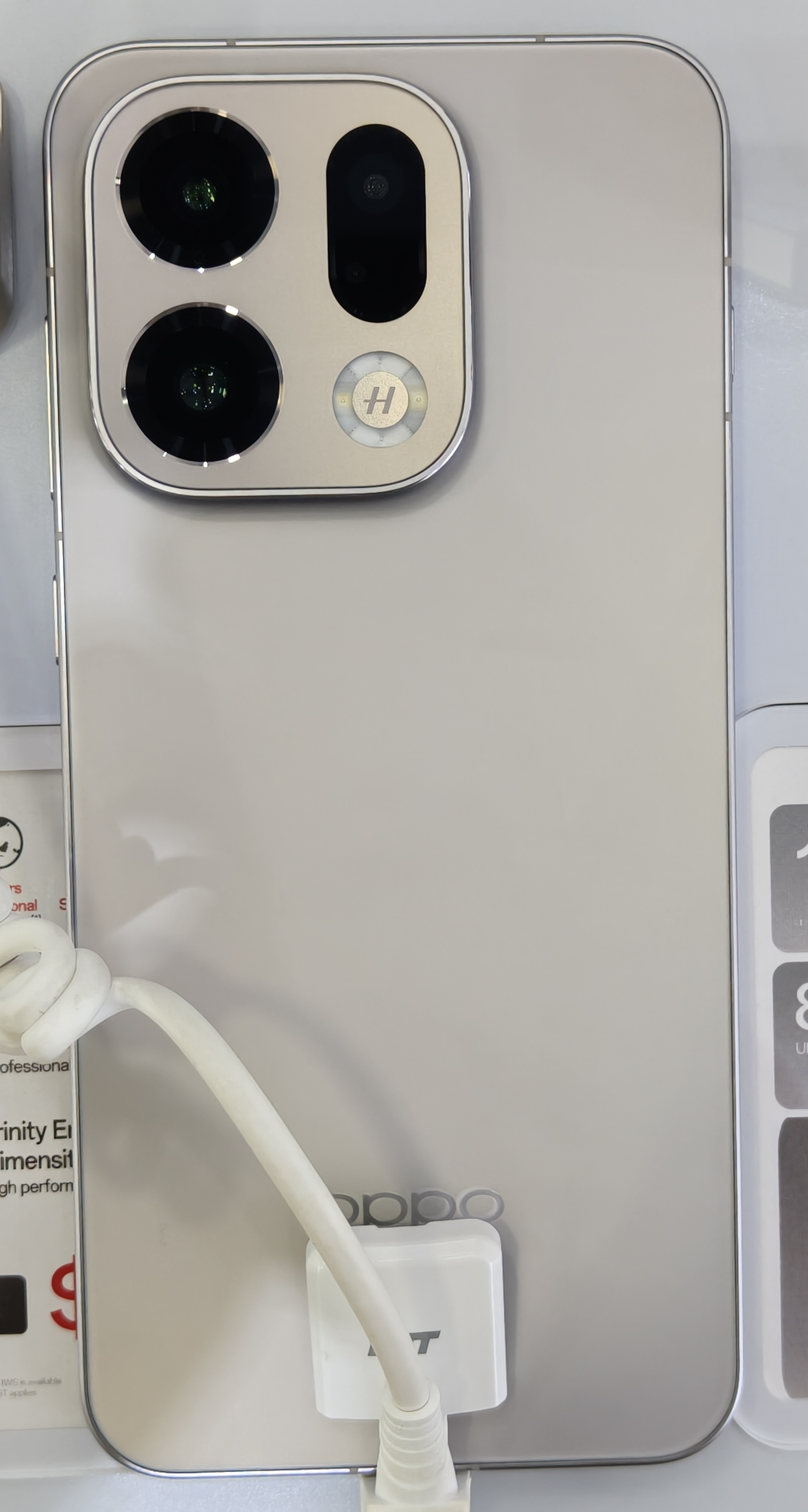
Oppo Find X9

The OPPO Find X9 series was launched globally on October 28, 2025.

== Oppo Pad Series ==
Release timeline
2022	Oppo Pad
2022	Oppo Pad Air
2023	Oppo Pad 2
2023	Oppo Pad Air2
2024	Oppo Pad Neo
2024	Oppo Pad 3 Pro
2024	Oppo Pad 3
2025	Oppo Pad 4 Pro
2025	Oppo Pad SE
2025	Oppo Pad 5
2025	Oppo Pad Air5
2026	Oppo Pad 5 Pro
2026	Oppo Pad Mini
2026	Oppo Pad 6

This was released in 2022 to compete with other Chinese tablets, like Xiaomi Mi Pad.

Model	Release date	Display	Chipset	Memory		Rear camera	Front camera	Operating system	Battery	Charging
Model	Release date	Display	Chipset	ROM	RAM	Rear camera	Front camera	Operating system	Battery	Charging
Pad	3 March 2022	11.0" 120 Hz WQXGA (1600 × 2560 px) IPS LCD	Qualcomm Snapdragon 870	128/256 GB	6/8 GB	13 MP	8 MP	Android 11; ColorOS 12	8360 mAh	33W
Pad Air	1 June 2022	10.36" (1200 × 2000 px) IPS LCD	Qualcomm Snapdragon 680	64/128 GB	4/6 GB	8 MP	5 MP	Android 12; ColorOS 12	7100 mAh	18W
Pad 2	24 March 2023	11.61" 144 Hz (2000 × 2800 px) IPS LCD	MediaTek Dimensity 9000	256/512 GB	8/12 GB	13 MP	8 MP	Android 13; ColorOS 13.1	9510 mAh	67W
Pad Air2	27 November 2023	11.4" 90 Hz (1720 × 2408 px) IPS LCD	MediaTek Helio G99	128/256 GB	6/8 GB	8 MP	8 MP	Android 13; ColorOS 13.2	8000 mAh	33W
Pad Neo	16 January 2024	11.4" 90 Hz (1720 × 2408 px) IPS LCD	MediaTek Helio G99	128 GB	6/8 GB	8 MP	8 MP	Android 13; ColorOS 13.2	8000 mAh	33W
Pad 3 Pro	30 October 2024	12.1" 144 Hz (2120 × 3000 px) IPS LCD	Qualcomm Snapdragon 8 Gen 3	256/512 GB/1TB	8/12/16 GB	13 MP	8 MP	Android 14; ColorOS 14.1	9510 mAh	67W
Pad 3	29 November 2024	11.61" 144 Hz (2000 × 2800 px) IPS LCD	MediaTek Dimensity 8350	128/256/512 GB	8/12 GB	8 MP	8 MP	Android 15; ColorOS 15	9520 mAh	67W
Pad 4 Pro	10 April 2025	13.2" 144 Hz (2400 × 3392 px) IPS LCD	Qualcomm Snapdragon 8 Elite	256/512 GB	8/12/16 GB	13 MP	8 MP	Android 15; ColorOS 15	12140 mAh	67W
Pad SE	23 May 2025	11.0" 90 Hz WUXGA (1200 × 1920 px) IPS LCD	MediaTek Helio G100	128/256 GB	4/6/8 GB	5 MP	5 MP	Android 15; ColorOS 15	9340 mAh	33W
Pad 5	22 October 2025	12.1" 144 Hz (2120 × 3000 px) IPS LCD	MediaTek Dimensity 9400+	128/256/512 GB	8/12/16 GB	8 MP	8 MP	Android 16; ColorOS 16	10420 mAh	67W
Pad Air5	31 December 2025	12.1" 120 Hz (1980 × 2800 px) IPS LCD	MediaTek Dimensity 7300 Ultra	128/256 GB	8/12 GB	8 MP	8 MP	Android 16; ColorOS 16	10050 mAh	33W
Pad 5 Pro	21 April 2026	13.2" 144 Hz (2120 x 3000 px) IPS LCD	Qualcomm Snapdragon 8 Elite Gen 5	256/512 GB	8/12/16 GB	13 MP	8 MP	Android 16; ColorOS 16	13380 mAh	67W
Pad Mini	21 April 2026	8.8" 144 Hz (1680 x 2520 px) AMOLED	Qualcomm Snapdragon 8 Gen 5	256/512 GB	8/12 GB	13 MP	8 MP	Android 16; ColorOS 16	8000 mAh	67W
Pad 6	29 May 2026	12.1" 144 Hz (2120 x 3000 px) IPS LCD	MediaTek Dimensity 9500s	256/512 GB	8/12/16 GB	8 MP	8 MP	Android 16; ColorOS 16	10420 mAh	67W

== Oppo Neo Series ==
Release timeline
2014	Oppo Neo
2014	Oppo Neo 3
2014	Oppo Neo 5
2015	Oppo Neo 5s
2015	Oppo Neo 5 (2015)
2015	Oppo Neo 7

The Oppo Neo series was a line of budget-friendly, entry-level smartphones, primarily active between 2014 and 2015.

Model	Release date	Display	Chipset	Memory		Camera		Operating system	Battery	Charging
Model	Release date	Display	Chipset	ROM	RAM	Rear camera	Front camera	Operating system	Battery	Charging
Neo	February 2014	4.5" WVGA (480 × 800 px) IPS LCD	MediaTek MT6572	4 GB	512 MB	5 MP	2 MP	Android 4.2; ColorOS	1900 mAh	5W
Neo 3	August 2014	4.5" FWVGA (480 x 854 px) IPS LCD	MediaTek MT6572	4 GB	1 GB	5 MP	2 MP	Android 4.2; ColorOS	1900 mAh	5W
Neo 5	August 2014	4.5" FWVGA (480 x 854 px) IPS LCD	Qualcomm Snapdragon 400	4 GB	1 GB	5 MP	2 MP	Android 4.3; ColorOS 1.4	1900 mAh	5W
Neo 5s	May 2015	4.5" FWVGA (480 x 854 px) IPS LCD	Qualcomm Snapdragon 410	8 GB	1 GB	8 MP	2 MP	Android 4.4.2; ColorOS 2.0	2000 mAh	5W
Neo 5 (2015)	August 2015	4.5" FWVGA (480 x 854 px) IPS LCD	MediaTek MT6582	8/16 GB	1 GB	8 MP	2 MP	Android 4.4.2; ColorOS 2.0	2000 mAh	5W
Neo 7	October 2015	5.0" qHD (540 × 960 px) IPS LCD	MediaTek MT6582 (3G model); Qualcomm Snapdragon 410 (4G model)	16 GB	1 GB	8 MP	5 MP	Android 5.1; ColorOS 2.1	2420 mAh	5W

== Oppo N Series ==
=== N1 ===
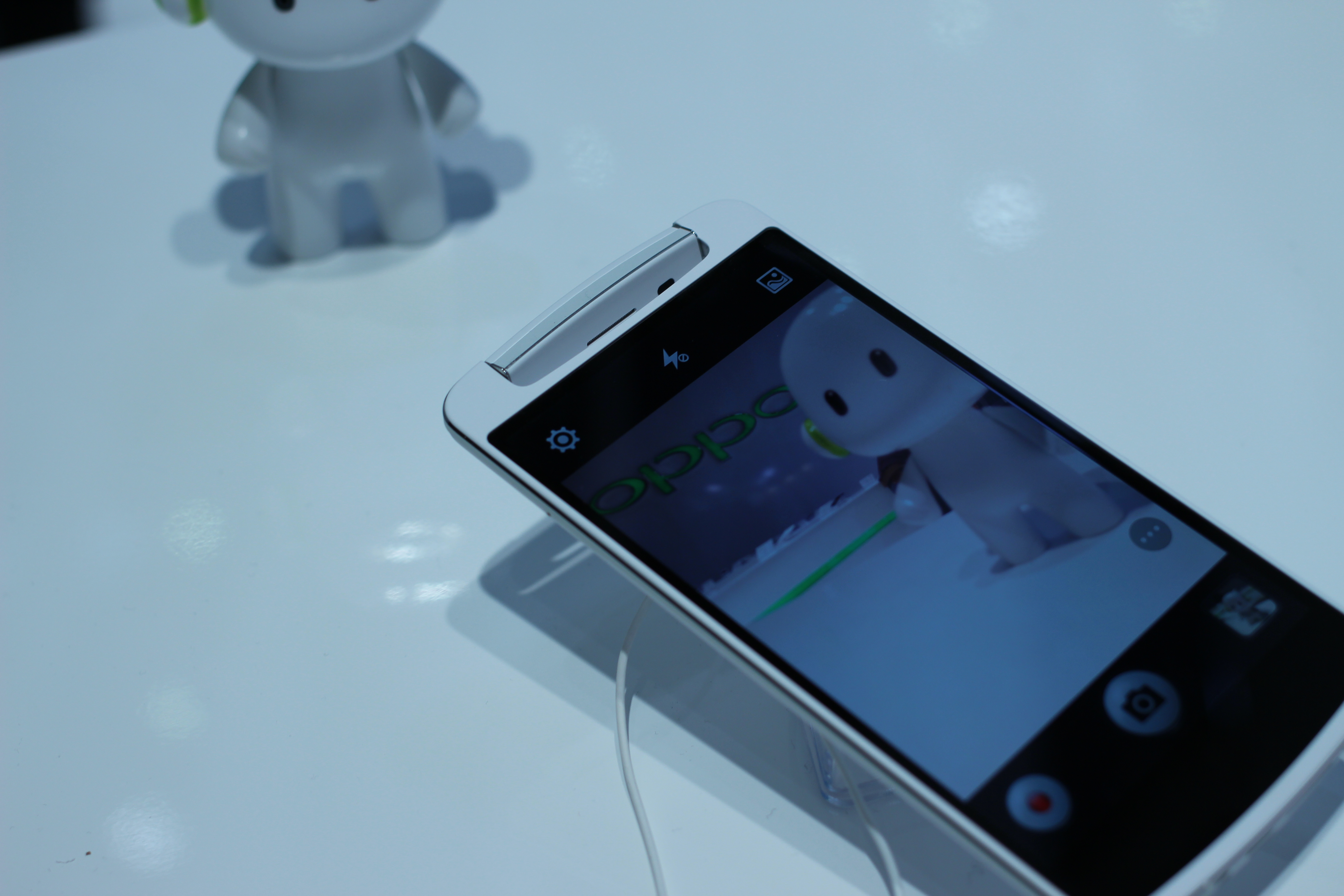
Oppo N1

On 23 September 2013, Oppo announced the N1, which has a 5.9″ 1080p display (373 ppi), 1.7 GHz Qualcomm Snapdragon 600 processor, 3,610mAh battery, 16 GB or 32 GB of storage, 2 GB RAM, and a 13 MP camera that can rotate, touch-panel on the back, and option to flash CyanogenMod. It was released in December 2013.

=== N1 mini ===
Oppo announced the N1 mini in August 2014, The N1 mini uses a 5.0" IPS LCD HD 720p Display, powered by the Qualcomm Snapdragon 400 1.6 GHz. The N1 mini uses a 2,140mAh battery. It has 16 GB of storage, 2 GB RAM. The N1 mini uses a 13 MP rotating pop-up main camera. It runs on Android 4.3 Jelly Bean, ColorOS 1.4 UI.

=== N3 ===
A successor, the Oppo N3, is priced at $449 as of early 2016. The N3 has a slightly smaller 5.5" Full HD screen compared to 5.9" screen on the N1. It also has more powerful specs with Qualcomm Snapdragon 801 processor with 3 GB of RAM and 32 GB of storage. The Oppo N3 has a rotate 16 MP camera with Schneider lens which can rotate 180° to the front as selfie camera. It runs on Android 4.4 KitKat with customized ColorOS 2.1 UI. The N3 has a 3000mAh battery and a fingerprint scanner on the back.

Model	Release date	Display	Chipset	Memory		Rotating camera (rear + front)	OS	Battery
Model	Release date	Display	Chipset	ROM	RAM	Rotating camera (rear + front)	OS	Battery
N1	December 2013	5.9" Full HD (1080x1920) IPS LCD	Qualcomm Snapdragon 600 (S4 Pro)	16/32GB	2GB	13 MP	Android 4.2 (4.3 if using CyanogenMod)	3610mAh
N1 mini	August 2014	5" HD (720x1280) IPS LCD	Qualcomm Snapdragon 400	16GB	2GB	13 MP	Android 4.3 (ColorOS 1.4)	2140mAh
N3	January 2015	5.5" Full HD (1080x1920) IPS LCD	Qualcomm Snapdragon 801	32GB	2GB	16 MP	Android 4.4 (ColorOS 2)	3000mAh

== Oppo R Series ==
The Oppo R Series focused on mobile photography. The Oppo R Series was discontinued in 2019 and was replaced by the Oppo Reno Series.

Model	Release date	Display	Chipset	Memory		Rear camera	Front camera	OS	Battery	Ref.
Model	Release date	Display	Chipset	ROM	RAM	Rear camera	Front camera	OS	Battery	Ref.
R1	April 2014	5" HD (720x1280) IPS LCD	MediaTek MT6582	16 GB	1 GB	8 MP	5 MP	Android 4.2	2410mAh	
R1s	June 2014	5" HD (720x1280) IPS LCD	Qualcomm Snapdragon 400	16 GB	1 GB	13 MP	5 MP	Android 4.3	2410mAh	
R1x	Jan 2015	5" HD (720x1280) IPS LCD	Qualcomm Snapdragon 615	16 GB	2 GB	13 MP	5 MP	Android 4.4	2420mAh	
R3	June 2014	5" HD (720x1280) IPS LCD	Qualcomm Snapdragon 400	8 GB	1 GB	8 MP	5 MP	Android 4.3	2410mAh	
R5	October 2014	5.2" Full HD (1080x1920) AMOLED	Qualcomm Snapdragon 615	16 GB	2 GB	13 MP	5 MP	Android 4.4.4	2000mAh	
R5s	August 2015	5.2" Full HD (1080x1920) AMOLED	Qualcomm Snapdragon 615	32 GB	3 GB	13 MP	5 MP	Android 4.4.4	2000mAh	
R7	May 2015	5" Full HD (1080x1920) AMOLED	Qualcomm Snapdragon 615	16 GB	3 GB	13 MP	8 MP	Android 4.4.2	2320mAh	
R7+	May 2015	6" Full HD (1080x1920) AMOLED	Qualcomm Snapdragon 615	32 GB/ 64 GB	3 GB/ 4 GB	13 MP	8 MP	Android 4.4.2	4100mAh	
R7s	October 2015	5.5" Full HD (1080x1920) AMOLED	Qualcomm Snapdragon 615	32 GB	4 GB	13 MP	8 MP	Android 5.1	3070mAh	
R7 Lite	October 2015	5" HD (720x1080) AMOLED	Qualcomm Snapdragon 615	16 GB	2 GB	13 MP	8 MP	Android 5.1	2320mAh	
R9 (F1 Plus)	March 2016	5.5" Full HD (1080x1920) AMOLED	MediaTek MT6755	64 GB	4 GB	13 MP	16 MP	Android 5.1	2850mAh	
R9+	March 2016	6" Full HD (1080x1920) IPS LCD	Qualcomm Snapdragon 652	64 GB /128 GB	4 GB	16 MP	16 MP	Android 5.1	4120mAh	
R9s	October 2016	5.5" Full HD (1080x1920) AMOLED	Qualcomm Snapdragon 625	64 GB	4 GB	16 MP	16 MP	Android 6.0.1	3010mAh	
R9s+	October 2016	6" Full HD (1080x1920) AMOLED	Qualcomm Snapdragon 653	64 GB	6 GB	16 MP	16 MP	Android 6.0.1	4000mAh	
R11	June 2017	5.5" Full HD (1080x1920) AMOLED	Qualcomm Snapdragon 660	64 GB /128 GB	4 GB /6 GB	16 MP + 20 MP	20 MP	Android 7.1	3000mAh	
R11+	June 2017	6" Full HD (1080x1920) IPS LCD	Qualcomm Snapdragon 660	64 GB	6 GB	16 MP + 20 MP	20 MP	Android 7.1	4000mAh	
R11s	October 2017	6" Full HD+ (1080x2160) AMOLED	Qualcomm Snapdragon 660	64 GB	4 GB	16 MP + 20 MP	20 MP	Android 7.1	3200mAh	
R11s+	October 2017	6.43" Full HD+ (1080x2160) AMOLED	Qualcomm Snapdragon 660	64 GB	6 GB	16 MP + 20 MP	20 MP	Android 7.1	4000mAh	
R15	March 2018	6.28" Full HD+ (1080x2280) AMOLED	MediaTek Helio P60	128 GB	4 GB /8 GB	16 MP + 5 MP	20 MP	Android 8.1	3450mAh	
R15 Pro	March 2018	6.28" Full HD+ (1080x2280) AMOLED	Qualcomm Snapdragon 660	128 GB	6 GB	16 MP + 20 MP	20 MP	Android 8.1	3430mAh	
R15x	October 2018	6.4" Full HD+ (1080x2340) AMOLED	Qualcomm Snapdragon 660	128 GB	6 GB	16 MP + 2 MP	25 MP	Android 8.1	3600mAh	
R17	August 2018	6.4" Full HD+ (1080x2340) AMOLED	Qualcomm Snapdragon 670	128 GB	6 GB /8 GB	16 MP + 5 MP	25 MP	Android 8.1	3500mAh	
R17 Pro	August 2018	6.4" Full HD+ (1080x2340) AMOLED	Qualcomm Snapdragon 710	128 GB	6 GB /8 GB	12 MP + 20 MP + TOF	25 MP	Android 8.1	3700mAh	
R17 Neo	November 2018	6.41" Full HD+ (1080x2340) AMOLED	Qualcomm Snapdragon 660	128 GB	4 GB	16 MP + 2 MP	25 MP	Android 8.1	3600mAh	

== Oppo K Series ==
The Oppo K Series is a new smartphone series by Oppo which focuses on gaming devices. The first phone that will be launched on the K Series is the Oppo K1.

=== Oppo K1 ===
The Oppo K1 was announced at Oppo's special event in China on 10 October 2018. It features the Water-drop notch design language of Oppo and Vivo phones and an under-display fingerprint sensor. Its main difference from the other Oppo series is its chipset, sporting a Snapdragon 660 processor. Oppo K1 comes with 6.41-inch Full HD+ AMOLED display. It also has 4 GB RAM and 64 GB storage. The phone features 16 MP + 2 MP dual camera along with 25 MP selfie camera. It also packs a 3600 mAh battery.

=== Oppo K3 ===
The Oppo K3 was officially released in May 2019, but made available to buy on 23 July via Amazon in India. The phone features 6.5-inch full-screen FHD+ AMOLED and waterdrop notch. Besides, the K3 shares similar design, hardware specs and software to Realme X, the Snapdragon 710 SoC, ColorOS 6.0 based on Android 9.0 Pie and under-display fingerprint scanner. It comes with either 6 or 8 GB RAM, and 64 or 128 GB storage. There's a dual-camera 16 MP + 2 MP setup on the back and 16 MP motorized pop-up camera on the front. It packs a 3765mAh battery with VOOC 3.0 fast charging tech.

=== Oppo K5 ===
The Oppo K5 was announced on 10 October 2019. The phone features a 6.4" AMOLED screen with Full HD+ resolution with 19.5:9 aspect ratio. It also features an under-display fingerprint scanner. Oppo K5 is powered by the Qualcomm Snapdragon 730G processor with 6 or 8 GB of RAM and 128/256 GB of storage, packing a 4000mAh battery with VOOC 4.0 30W fast charging, which can charged from 0 to 67% in 30 minutes and fully charged in 73 minutes. It also has a quad-camera setup of 64 MP + 8 MP + 2 MP + 2 MP and a 32 MP selfie camera on the waterdrop notch. The K5 runs Android 9.0 Pie with customized ColorOS 6.1 UI.

=== Oppo K7 5G ===
Oppo K7 5G is a smartphone first announced on 4 August 2020. It has a 6.4" FHD+ AMOLED display. Oppo K7 5G uses an octa-core, 2.4 GHz, 7 nm Snapdragon 765G processor. The smartphone comes with 8 GB of RAM, and either 128 or 256 GB of storage. The primary camera is 48 megapixels, accompanied by an 8 MP ultrawide camera, a 2 MP depth sensor, and a 2 MP monochrome camera. The primary front camera is 32 MP. The battery size is 4200 mAh.

=== Oppo K7x ===
Oppo K7x is a smartphone first announced on 4 November 2020. It has a 6.5" FHD+ IPS display running at a 90 Hz refresh rate. Oppo K7x uses an octa-core, 2.0 GHz, 7 nm Dimensity 720 processor. The smartphone comes with either 6 or 8 GB of RAM, and either 128 or 256 GB of storage. The primary camera is 48 megapixels, accompanied by an 8 MP ultrawide camera, a 2 MP depth sensor, and a 2 MP macro camera. The primary front camera is 16 MP. The battery size is 5000 mAh.

=== Oppo K9 ===
Oppo K9 is a smartphone first announced on 6 May 2021. It has a 6.43" FHD+ AMOLED display running at a 90 Hz refresh rate. Oppo K9 uses an octa-core, 2.8 GHz, 7 nm Snapdragon 768G processor. The smartphone comes with 8 GB of RAM, and either 128 or 256 GB of storage. The primary camera is 64 megapixels, accompanied by an 8 MP ultrawide camera, and a 2 MP macro camera. The primary front camera is 32 MP. The battery size is 4300 mAh.

=== Oppo K9 Pro ===
Oppo K9 Pro is a smartphone first announced on 26 September 2021. It has a 6.43" FHD+ AMOLED display running at a 120 Hz refresh rate. Oppo K9 Pro uses an octa-core, 3.0 GHz, 6 nm Dimensity 1200 processor. The smartphone comes with 8/12 GB of RAM, and either 128 or 256 GB of storage. The primary camera is 64 megapixels, accompanied by an 8 MP ultrawide camera, and a 2 MP macro camera. The primary front camera is 32 MP. The battery size is 4500 mAh.

=== Oppo K9s ===
Oppo K9s is a smartphone first announced on 20 October 2021. It has a 6.59" FHD+ IPS LCD running at a 120 Hz refresh rate. Oppo K9s uses an octa-core, 2.4 GHz, 6 nm Snapdragon 778G processor. The smartphone comes with either 6 or 8 GB of RAM, and either 128 or 256 GB of storage. The primary camera is 64 megapixels, accompanied by an 8 MP ultrawide camera, and a 2 MP macro camera. The primary front camera is 16 MP. The battery size is 5000 mAh.

=== Oppo K9x ===
Oppo K9x is a smartphone first announced on 23 December 2021. It has a 6.49" FHD+ IPS LCD running at a 90 Hz refresh rate. Oppo K9x uses an octa-core, 2.4 GHz, 6 nm Dimensity 810 processor. The smartphone comes with either 6 or 8 GB of RAM, and either 128 or 256 GB of storage. The primary camera is 64 megapixels, accompanied by an 2 MP depth camera, and a 2 MP macro camera. The primary front camera is 16 MP. The battery size is 5000 mAh.

=== Oppo K10 ===
Oppo K10 is a smartphone first announced on 23 March 2022. It has a 6.59" FHD+ IPS LCD running at a 90 Hz refresh rate. Oppo K10 uses an octa-core, 2.4 GHz, 6 nm Snapdragon 680 processor. The smartphone comes with 6 or 8 GB of RAM, and 128 GB of storage. The primary camera is 50 megapixels, accompanied by an 2 MP macro camera, and a 2 MP depth sensor. The primary front camera is 16 MP. The battery size is 5000 mAh.

=== Oppo K10 Pro ===
Oppo K10 Pro is a smartphone first announced on 24 April 2022. It has a 6.62" FHD+ AMOLED display running at a 120 Hz refresh rate. Oppo K10 Pro uses an octa-core, 2.84 GHz, 5 nm Snapdragon 888 processor. The smartphone comes with 8 or 12 GB of RAM, and either 128 or 256 GB of storage. The primary camera is 50 megapixels, accompanied by an 8 MP ultrawide camera, and a 2 MP macro sensor. The primary front camera is 16 MP. The battery size is 5000 mAh.

=== Oppo K10 5G (China) ===
Oppo K10 5G (China) is a smartphone first announced on 24 April 2022. It has a 6.59" FHD+ IPS LCD running at a 120 Hz refresh rate. Oppo K10 5G (China) uses an octa-core, 2.75 GHz, 5 nm Dimensity 8000 Max. The smartphone comes with 8 or 12 GB of RAM, and either 128 or 256 GB of storage. The primary camera is 64 megapixels, accompanied by an 8 MP ultrawide camera, and a 2 MP macro sensor. The primary front camera is 16 MP. The battery size is 5000 mAh.

=== Oppo K10 5G (Global) ===
Oppo K10 5G (Global) is a smartphone first announced on 1 June 2022. It has a 6.56" HD+ IPS LCD running at a 90 Hz refresh rate. Oppo K10 5G (Global) uses an octa-core, 2.4 GHz, 6 nm Dimensity 810. The smartphone comes with 6 or 8 GB of RAM, and 128 GB of storage. The primary camera is 48 megapixels, and a 2 MP depth camera. The primary front camera is 8 MP. The battery size is 5000 mAh.

=== Oppo K10x ===
Oppo K10x is a smartphone first announced on 16 September 2022. It has a 6.59" FHD+ IPS LCD running at a 120 Hz refresh rate. Oppo K10x uses an octa-core, 2.2 GHz, 6 nm Snapdragon 695. The smartphone comes with 6/12 GB of RAM, and either 128 or 256 GB of storage. The primary camera is 64 megapixels, accompanied by an 2 MP macro camera, and a 2 MP depth sensor. The primary front camera is 16 MP. The battery size is 5000 mAh.

=== Oppo K11x ===
Oppo K11x is a smartphone first announced on 25 May 2023. It has a 6.72" FHD+ IPS LCD running at a 120 Hz refresh rate. Oppo K11x uses an octa-core, 2.2 GHz, 6 nm Snapdragon 695. The smartphone comes with 8 or 12 GB of RAM, and either 128 or 256 GB of storage. The primary camera is 108 megapixels, and a 2 MP depth camera. The primary front camera is 16 MP. The battery size is 5000 mAh.

=== Oppo K11 ===
Oppo K11 is a smartphone first announced on 25 July 2023. It has a 6.7" FHD+ AMOLED display running at a 120 Hz refresh rate. Oppo K11 uses an octa-core, 2.7 GHz, 6 nm Snapdragon 782G. The smartphone comes with 8 or 12 GB of RAM, and either 256 or 512 GB of storage. The primary camera is 50 megapixels, accompanied by an 8 MP ultrawide camera, and a 2 MP macro sensor. The primary front camera is 16 MP. The battery size is 5000 mAh.

=== Oppo K12x (China) ===
Oppo K12x (China) is a smartphone first announced on 14 March 2024. It has a 6.67" FHD+ OLED display running at a 120 Hz refresh rate. Oppo K12x (China) uses an octa-core, 2.2 GHz, 6 nm Snapdragon 695. The smartphone comes with 8 or 12 GB of RAM, and either 128, 256 or 512 GB of storage. The primary camera is 50 megapixels, and a 2 MP depth camera. The primary front camera is 16 MP. The battery size is 5500 mAh.

=== Oppo K12 ===
Oppo K12 is a smartphone first announced on 24 April 2024. It has a 6.7" FHD+ AMOLED display running at a 120 Hz refresh rate. Oppo K12 uses an octa-core, 2.63 GHz, 4 nm Snapdragon 7 Gen 3. The smartphone comes with 8 or 12 GB of RAM, and either 256 or 512 GB of storage. The primary camera is 50 megapixels, and a 8 MP ultrawide camera. The primary front camera is 16 MP. The battery size is 5500 mAh.

=== Oppo K12x (Global) ===
Oppo K12x (Global) is a smartphone first announced on 29 July 2024. It has a 6.67" HD+ IPS LCD running at a 120 Hz refresh rate. Oppo K12x (Global) uses an octa-core, 2.4 GHz, 6 nm Dimensity 6300. The smartphone comes with 6 or 8 GB of RAM, and either 128 or 256 GB of storage. The primary camera is 32 megapixels, and a 2 MP depth camera. The primary front camera is 8 MP. The battery size is 5100 mAh.

=== Oppo K12 Plus ===
Oppo K12 Plus is a smartphone first announced on 12 October 2024. It has a 6.7" FHD+ AMOLED display running at a 120 Hz refresh rate. Oppo K12 Plus uses an octa-core, 2.63 GHz, 4 nm Snapdragon 7 Gen 3. The smartphone comes with 8 or 12 GB of RAM, and either 256 or 512 GB of storage. The primary camera is 50 megapixels, and a 8 MP ultrawide camera. The primary front camera is 16 MP. The battery size is 6400 mAh.

=== Oppo K13 (Also known as K13x/K12s for China market) ===
Oppo K13 is a smartphone first announced on 21 April 2025. It has a 6.67" FHD+ AMOLED display running at a 120 Hz refresh rate. Oppo K13 uses an octa-core, 2.3 GHz, 4 nm Snapdragon 6 Gen 4. The smartphone comes with 8 or 12 GB of RAM, and either 128, 256 or 512 GB of storage. The primary camera is 50 megapixels, and a 2 MP depth camera. The primary front camera is 16 MP. The battery size is 7000 mAh.

=== Oppo K13x (Global) ===
Oppo K13x (Global) is a smartphone first announced on 23 June 2025. It has a 6.67" HD+ IPS LCD running at a 120 Hz refresh rate. Oppo K13x (Global) uses an octa-core, 2.4 GHz, 6 nm Dimensity 6300. The smartphone comes with 4, 6 or 8 GB of RAM, and either 128 or 256 GB of storage. The primary camera is 50 megapixels, and a 2 MP depth camera. The primary front camera is 8 MP. The battery size is 6000 mAh.

=== Oppo K13 Turbo Pro ===
Oppo K13 Turbo Pro is a smartphone first announced on 21 July 2025. It has a 6.8" FHD+ AMOLED display running at a 120 Hz refresh rate. Oppo K13 Turbo Pro uses an octa-core, 3.21 GHz, 4 nm Snapdragon 8s Gen 4. The smartphone comes with 8, 12 or 16 GB of RAM, and either 256 or 512 GB of storage. The primary camera is 50 megapixels, and a 2 MP depth camera. The primary front camera is 16 MP. The battery size is 7000 mAh.

=== Oppo K13 Turbo ===
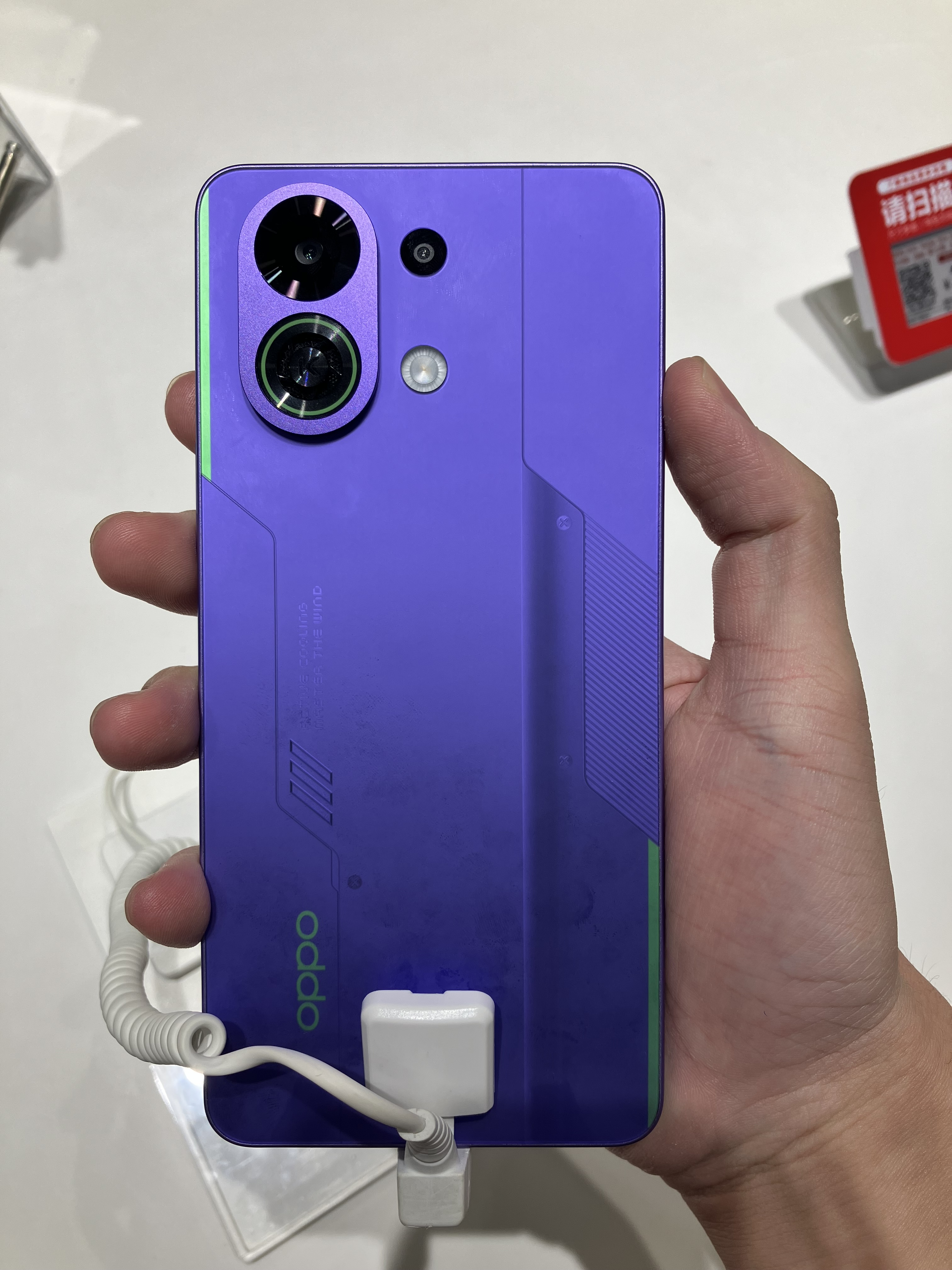
Oppo K13 Turbo

Oppo K13 Turbo is a smartphone first announced on 21 July 2025. It has a 6.8" FHD+ AMOLED display running at a 120 Hz refresh rate. Oppo K13 Turbo uses an octa-core, 3.25 GHz, 4 nm Dimensity 8450. The smartphone comes with 8, 12 or 16 GB of RAM, and either 128, 256 or 512 GB of storage. The primary camera is 50 megapixels, and a 2 MP depth camera. The primary front camera is 16 MP. The battery size is 7000 mAh.

=== Oppo K14x 5G ===
Oppo K14x 5G is a smartphone first announced on 10 February 2026. It has a 6.75" HD+ IPS LCD running at a 120 Hz refresh rate. Oppo K14x 5G uses an octa-core, 2.4 GHz, 6 nm Dimensity 6300. The smartphone comes with 4 or 6 GB of RAM, and 128 GB of storage. The primary camera is 50 megapixels, and a 2 MP depth camera. The primary front camera is 5 MP. The battery size is 6500 mAh.

== Oppo Reno Series ==
The Oppo Reno Series smartphone series by Oppo focuses on "Portrait Photography", successor of Oppo R Series.

=== Oppo Reno ===
In May 2019, Oppo released the Reno. The Oppo Reno has a 6.6-inch FHD+ AMOLED Display which is protected by Gorilla Glass 6. The phone is powered by Qualcomm Snapdragon 855 SoC which is coupled with 8 GB ram and 256 GB internal storage. As for the software, the phone came with Android 9.0 which is customized by the layer of ColorOS 6. In photographic section it has 48 MP + 13 MP + 8 MP rear camera along with 16 MP motorized pop-up for selfies.

Model	Release date	Display	Chipset	Memory		Rear camera	Front camera	Battery	Fast charging
Model	Release date	Display	Chipset	ROM	RAM	Rear camera	Front camera	Battery	Fast charging
Reno Z	June 2019	6.4" 2340×1080 AMOLED	MediaTek Helio P70	128/256 GB	4/6/8 GB	48 MP (Wide) 5 MP (Depth)	32 MP	4035 mAh	20W VOOC 3.0
Reno	April 2019	6.4" 2340×1080 AMOLED	Qualcomm Snapdragon 710	128/256 GB	6/8 GB	48 MP (Wide) 5 MP (Depth)	16 MP	3765 mAh	20W VOOC
Reno A	October 2019	6.4" 2340×1080 AMOLED	Qualcomm Snapdragon 710	128 GB	6 GB	16 MP (Wide) 2 MP (Depth)	25 MP	3600 mAh	—N/a
Reno 10x Zoom	June 2019	6.6" 2340×1080 AMOLED	Qualcomm Snapdragon 855	128/256 GB	6/8/12 GB	48 MP (Wide) 13 MP (Telephoto with 10 × Hybrid Zoom) 8 MP (Ultrawide)	16 MP	4065 mAh	20W VOOC 3.0
Reno 5G	May 2019	6.6" 2340×1080 AMOLED	Qualcomm Snapdragon 855	256 GB	8 GB	48 MP (Wide) 13 MP (Telephoto with 10 × Hybrid Zoom) 8 MP (Ultrawide)	16 MP	4065 mAh	20W VOOC 3.0

=== Oppo Reno2 ===
In October 2019, Oppo has revealed the second-generation of the Oppo Reno line-up phones, the Reno 2, Reno 2F along with India-exclusive Reno 2Z. The Reno 2 series has the same panoramic screen design. Reno 2 has an 6.55" Full HD+ Sunlight AMOLED display with Qualcomm Snapdragon 730G processor, 8 GB of RAM and 256 GB of Storage. It also has a quad-camera setup with a main 48 MP Sony IMX586 sensor + 13 MP + 8 MP + 2 MP. The Reno 2F has a 6.5" Full HD+ AMOLED display, powered by mid-range Mediatek Helio P70 processor with same amount of RAM and 128 GB of storage. It has a quad camera system with primary 48 MP + 8 MP + 2 MP + 2 MP. The Reno 2Z has a waterdrop 6.5" Full HD+ AMOLED display, powered by Mediatek Helio P90 chipset with 8 GB of RAM with 128 GB of storage. All three phones have a 16 MP selfie camera and 4000mAh battery with VOOC 3.0 20W fast charging.

Model	Release date	Display	Chipset	Memory		Rear camera	Front camera	Battery	Fast charging
Model	Release date	Display	Chipset	ROM	RAM	Rear camera	Front camera	Battery	Fast charging
Reno2 F	October 2019	6.5" Full HD+ (2340 × 1080 pixel) AMOLED	MediaTek Helio P70	128 GB	8 GB	48 MP (Wide) 8 MP (Ultrawide) 2 MP (Depth) 2 MP (Mono)	16 MP	4000 mAh	20W VOOC 3.0
Reno2 Z	September 2019	6.5" Full HD+ (2340 × 1080 pixel) AMOLED	MediaTek Helio P90	128/256 GB	8 GB	48 MP (Wide) 8 MP (Ultrawide) 2 MP (Depth) 2 MP (Mono)	16 MP	4000 mAh	20W VOOC 3.0
Reno2	September 2019	6.5" Full HD+ (2400 × 1080 pixel) AMOLED	Qualcomm Snapdragon 730G	128/256 GB	8 GB	48 MP (Wide) 8 MP (Ultrawide) 13 MP (Telephoto with 20 × Zoom) 2 MP (Depth)	16 MP	4000 mAh	20W VOOC 3.0

=== Oppo Ace ===
In October 2019, Oppo released Reno Ace in China. It is powered by Qualcomm Snapdragon 855+ SoC and used a 6.5-inch AMOLED capacitive touchscreen display, which is protected by Gorilla Glass 6 technology. It either comes with 8GB or 12GB of RAM (256GB model only) and 128GB or 256GB of storage. The phone features Quad (48 MP + 13 MP + 8 MP + 2 MP) camera on the rear along with 16 MP selfie camera. It also packs a 4,000 mAh battery which charges to 100% in just 30 minutes by using 65W fast charging technology.

Model	Release date	Display	Chipset	Memory		Rear camera	Front camera	Battery	Fast charging
Model	Release date	Display	Chipset	ROM	RAM	Rear camera	Front camera	Battery	Fast charging
Reno Ace	October 2019	6.5" 2400×1080 90 Hz AMOLED	Qualcomm Snapdragon 855+	128/256 GB	8/12 GB	48 MP (Wide) 8 MP (Ultrawide) 13 MP (Telephoto) 2 MP (Monochrome)	16 MP	4000 mAh	65W SuperVOOC 2.0
Ace2	April 2020	6.55" 2400×1080 90 Hz AMOLED	Qualcomm Snapdragon 865	128/256 GB	8/12 GB	48 MP (Wide) 8 MP (Ultrawide) 2 MP (Depth) 2 MP (Monochrome)	16 MP	4000 mAh	65W SuperVOOC 2.0

=== Oppo Reno3 ===
Model	Release date	Display	Chipset	Memory		Rear camera	Front camera	Battery	Fast charging
Model	Release date	Display	Chipset	ROM	RAM	Rear camera	Front camera	Battery	Fast charging
Reno3 5G	December 2019	6.4" Full HD+ (2400 × 1080 px) AMOLED	MediaTek Dimensity 1000L	128 GB	8/12 GB	64 MP (Wide) 8 MP (Ultrawide) 2 MP (Monochrome) 2 MP (Depth)	32 MP	4025 mAh	30W VOOC 4.0
Reno3 Pro 5G	December 2019	6.5" 90 Hz Full HD+ (2400 × 1080 px) AMOLED	Qualcomm Snapdragon 765G	128/256 GB	8/12 GB	48 MP (Wide) 8 MP (Ultrawide) 13 MP (Telephoto) 2 MP (Monochrome)	32 MP	4025 mAh	30W VOOC 4.0
Reno3	March 2020	6.4" Full HD+ (2400 × 1080 px) AMOLED	MediaTek Helio P90	128 GB	8 GB	48 MP (Wide) 8 MP (Ultrawide) 13 MP (Telephoto) 2 MP (Monochrome)	44 MP	4025 mAh	20W VOOC 3.0
Reno3 Pro	March 2020	6.4" Full HD+ (2400 × 1080 px) AMOLED	MediaTek Helio P95	128/256 GB	8 GB	64 MP (Wide) 8 MP (Ultrawide) 13 MP (Telephoto) 2 MP (Depth)	44 MP (Wide) 2 MP (Depth)	4025 mAh	30W VOOC 4.0
Reno3 Youth	February 2020	6.4" Full HD+ (2400 × 1080 px) AMOLED	Qualcomm Snapdragon 765G	128 GB	8 GB	48 MP (Wide) 8 MP (Ultrawide) 2 MP (Monochrome) 2 MP (Depth)	32 MP	4025 mAh	30W VOOC 4.0

=== Oppo Reno4 ===
Model	Release date	Display	Chipset	Memory		Rear camera	Front camera	Battery	Fast charging
Model	Release date	Display	Chipset	ROM	RAM	Rear camera	Front camera	Battery	Fast charging
Reno4 5G	June 2020	6.43" Full HD+ (2400 × 1080) AMOLED	Qualcomm Snapdragon 765G	128/256 GB	8 GB	48 MP (Wide) 8 MP (Ultrawide) 2 MP (Depth)	32 MP (Wide) 2 MP (Depth)	4000 mAh	65W SuperVOOC 2.0
Reno4 Pro 5G	June 2020	6.55" 90 Hz Full HD+ (2400×1080) AMOLED	Qualcomm Snapdragon 765G	128/256 GB	8/12 GB	48 MP (Wide) 12 MP (Ultrawide) 13 MP (Telephoto)	32 MP	4000 mAh	65W SuperVOOC 2.0
Reno4	August 2020	6.4" Full HD+ (2400 × 1080) AMOLED	Qualcomm Snapdragon 720G	128 GB	8 GB	48 MP (Wide) 8 MP (Ultrawide) 2 MP (Macro) 2 MP (Monochrome)	32 MP (Wide) 2 MP (Depth)	4015 mAh	30W VOOC 4.0
Reno4 Pro	August 2020	6.5" 90 Hz Full HD+ (2400 × 1080) AMOLED	Qualcomm Snapdragon 720G	128/256 GB	8 GB	48 MP (Wide) 8 MP (Ultrawide) 2 MP (Macro) 2 MP (Monochrome)	32 MP	4000 mAh	65W SuperVOOC 2.0
Reno4 SE	September 2020	6.43" Full HD+ (2400 × 1080) AMOLED	MediaTek Dimensity 720	128/256 GB	8 GB	48 MP (Wide) 8 MP (Ultrawide) 2 MP (Depth)	32 MP	4300mAh	65W SuperVOOC 2.0
Reno4 Lite (Oppo F17 Pro)	September 2020	6.43" Full HD+ (2400 × 1080) AMOLED	MediaTek Helio P95	128 GB	8 GB	48 MP (Wide) 8 MP (Ultrawide) 2 MP (Macro) 2 MP (Depth)	16 MP (Wide) 2 MP (Depth)	4015mAh	30W VOOC 4.0
Reno4 F	October 2020	6.43" Full HD+ (2400 × 1080) AMOLED	MediaTek Helio P95	128 GB	8 GB	48 MP (Wide) 8 MP (Ultrawide) 2 MP (Macro) 2 MP (Depth)	16 MP (Wide) 2 MP (Depth)	4000mAh	18W
Reno4 Z 5G (Oppo A92s)	October 2020	6.57" 120 Hz Full HD+ (2400 × 1080) LTPS IPS LCD	MediaTek Dimensity 800	128 GB	8 GB	48 MP (Wide) 8 MP (Ultrawide) 2 MP (Macro) 2 MP (Depth)	16 MP (Wide) 2 MP (Depth)	4000mAh	18W

=== Oppo Reno5 ===
Model	Release date	Display	Chipset	Memory		Rear camera	Front camera	Battery	Fast charging	Ref.
Model	Release date	Display	Chipset	ROM	RAM	Rear camera	Front camera	Battery	Fast charging	Ref.
Reno5 4G	January 2021	6.43" 90 Hz Full HD+ (2400 × 1080) AMOLED	Qualcomm Snapdragon 720G	128 GB	8 GB	64 MP (Wide) 8 MP (Ultrawide) 2 MP (Macro) 2 MP (Depth)	44 MP	4300 mAh	50 W SuperVOOC	
Reno5 K	March 2021	6.43" 90 Hz Full HD+ (2400 × 1080) AMOLED	Qualcomm Snapdragon 750G	128/256 GB	8/12 GB	64 MP (Wide) 8 MP (Ultrawide) 2 MP (Macro) 2 MP (Depth)	32 MP	4300 mAh	65 W SuperVOOC 2.0	
Reno5 A	May 2021	6.5" 90 Hz Full HD+ (2400 × 1080) IPS LCD	Qualcomm Snapdragon 765G	128 GB	6 GB	64 MP (Wide) 8 MP (Ultrawide) 2 MP (Macro) 2 MP (Depth)	16 MP	4000 mAh	18 W	
Reno5 5G (Find X3 Lite)	January 2021	6.43" 90 Hz Full HD+ (2400 × 1080) AMOLED	Qualcomm Snapdragon 765G	128/256 GB	8/12 GB	64 MP (Wide) 8 MP (Ultrawide) 2 MP (Macro) 2 MP (Depth)	32 MP	4300 mAh	65 W SuperVOOC 2.0	
Reno5 Pro 5G	January 2021	6.55" 90 Hz Full HD+ (2400 × 1080) AMOLED	MediaTek Dimensity 1000+	128/256 GB	8/12 GB	64 MP (Wide) 8 MP (Ultrawide) 2 MP (Macro) 2 MP (Depth)	32 MP	4350 mAh	65 W SuperVOOC 2.0	
Reno5 Pro+ 5G (Find X3 Neo)	January 2021	6.55" 90 Hz Full HD+ (2400 × 1080) AMOLED	Qualcomm Snapdragon 865	128/256 GB	8/12 GB	50 MP (Wide) 13 MP (Telephoto) 16 MP (Ultrawide) 2 MP (Macro)	32 MP	4500 mAh	65 W SuperVOOC 2.0	
Reno5 F (Reno5 Lite)	March 2021	6.43" Full HD+ (2400 × 1080) AMOLED	MediaTek Helio P95	128 GB	8 GB	48 MP (Wide) 8 MP (Ultrawide) 2 MP (Macro) 2 MP (Depth)	32 MP	4310 mAh	30 W VOOC Flash Charge 4.0	
Reno5 Z (Oppo A94 5G)	April 2021	6.43" Full HD+ (2400 × 1080) AMOLED	MediaTek Dimensity 800U	128 GB	8 GB	48 MP (Wide) 8 MP (Ultrawide) 2 MP (Macro) 2 MP (Depth)	16 MP	4310 mAh	30 W VOOC Flash Charge 4.0	

=== Oppo Reno6 ===
Model	Release date	Display	Chipset	Memory		Rear camera	Front camera	Battery	Fast charging	Ref.
Model	Release date	Display	Chipset	ROM	RAM	Rear camera	Front camera	Battery	Fast charging	Ref.
Reno6 5G	June 2021	6.43" 90 Hz Full HD+ (2400×1080) AMOLED	MediaTek Dimensity 900	128/256 GB	8/12 GB	64 MP (wide) 8 MP (ultrawide) 2 MP (macro)	32 MP	4300 mAh	65 W SuperVOOC 2.0	
Reno6 Pro 5G	June 2021	6.55" 90 Hz Full HD+ (2400×1080) AMOLED	MediaTek Dimensity 1200	128/256 GB	8/12 GB	64 MP (wide) 8 MP (ultrawide) 2 MP (macro) 2 MP (depth)	32 MP	4500 mAh	65 W SuperVOOC 2.0	
Reno6 Pro+ 5G	June 2021	6.55" 90 Hz Full HD+ (2400×1080) AMOLED	Qualcomm Snapdragon 870	128/256 GB	8/12 GB	50 MP (wide) 13 MP (telephoto) 16 MP (ultrawide) 2 MP (macro)	32 MP	4500 mAh	65 W SuperVOOC 2.0	
Reno6	July 2021	6.4" 90 Hz Full HD+ (2400×1080) AMOLED	Qualcomm Snapdragon 720G	128 GB	8 GB	64 MP (wide) 8 MP (ultrawide) 2 MP (macro) 2 MP (depth)	44 MP	4310 mAh	50 W	
Reno6 Z	August 2021	6.4" Full HD+ (2400×1080) AMOLED	MediaTek Dimensity 800U	128/256 GB	8 GB	64 MP (wide) 8 MP (ultrawide) 2 MP (macro)	32 MP	4310 mAh	30 W	

=== Oppo Reno7 ===
Model	Release date	Display	Chipset	Memory		Rear camera	Front camera	Battery	Fast charging	Ref.
Model	Release date	Display	Chipset	ROM	RAM	Rear camera	Front camera	Battery	Fast charging	Ref.
Reno7 SE 5G	December 2021	6.43" 90 Hz Full HD+ (2400×1080) AMOLED	MediaTek Dimensity 900	128/256 GB	8 GB	48 MP (wide) 2 MP (macro) 2 MP (depth)	16 MP	4500 mAh	33 W	
Reno7 (F21 Pro)	March 2022	6.43" 90 Hz Full HD+ (2400×1080) AMOLED	Qualcomm Snapdragon 680 4G	256 GB	8 GB	64 MP (wide) 2 MP (microscope) 2 MP (depth)	32 MP (IMX709)	4500 mAh	33 W	
Reno7 5G (China Version)	December 2021	6.43" 90 Hz Full HD+ (2400×1080) AMOLED	Qualcomm Snapdragon 778G	128/256 GB	8/12 GB	64 MP (wide) 8 MP (ultrawide) 2 MP (macro)	32 MP (IMX709)	4500 mAh	65W	
Reno7 5G (Find X5 Lite)	February 2022	6.43" 90 Hz Full HD+ (2400×1080) AMOLED	MediaTek Dimensity 900	256 GB	8 GB	64 MP (wide) 8 MP (ultrawide) 2 MP (macro)	32 MP (IMX709)	4500 mAh	65W	
Reno7 Pro 5G	December 2021	6.55" 90 Hz Full HD+ (2400×1080) AMOLED	MediaTek Dimensity 1200 Max	512 GB	8/12 GB	50 MP (wide) 8 MP (ultrawide) 2 MP (macro)	32 MP (IMX709)	4500 mAh	65W	
Reno7 Z 5G (Reno 7 Lite, Reno8 Lite, F21 Pro 5G)	Reno 7 Z: March 2022; Reno 7 Lite: April 2022	6.43" Full HD+ (2400×1080) OLED	Qualcomm Snapdragon 695 5G	128 GB	8 GB	64 MP (wide) 2 MP (macro) 2 MP (depth)	16 MP	4500 mAh	33 W	
Reno7 A	June 2022	6.4" 90 Hz Full HD+ (2400×1080) AMOLED	Qualcomm Snapdragon 695 5G	128 GB	6 GB	48 MP (wide) 8 MP (ultrawide) 2 MP (macro)	16 MP	4500 mAh	18 W	

=== Oppo Reno8 ===
Model	Release date	Display	Chipset	Memory		Rear camera	Front camera	Battery	Fast charging	Ref.
Model	Release date	Display	Chipset	ROM	RAM	Rear camera	Front camera	Battery	Fast charging	Ref.
Reno8 5G (China Version)	May 2022	6.43" 90 Hz Full HD+ (2400×1080) AMOLED	MediaTek Dimensity 1300	128/256 GB	8/12 GB	50 MP (wide) 2 MP (macro) 2 MP (depth)	32 MP (IMX709)	4500 mAh	80W	
Reno8 Pro (China Version)	May 2022	6.62" 120 Hz Full HD+ (2400×1080) AMOLED	Qualcomm Snapdragon 7 Gen 1	128/256 GB	8/12 GB	50 MP (wide) 8 MP (ultrawide) 2 MP (macro)	32 MP (IMX709)	4500 mAh	80W	
Reno8 Pro+ (Reno8 Pro)	May 2022	6.7" 120 Hz Full HD+ (2412×1080) AMOLED	MediaTek Dimensity 8100 Max	256 GB	8/12 GB	50 MP (wide) 8 MP (ultrawide) 2 MP (macro)	32 MP (IMX709)	4500 mAh	80W	
Reno8 Lite 5G (Reno 7 Z, Reno7 Lite, F21 Pro 5G)	June 2022	6.43" Full HD+ (2400×1080) OLED	Qualcomm Snapdragon 695 5G	128 GB	8/12 GB	64 MP (wide) 2 MP (macro) 2 MP (depth)	16 MP	4500 mAh	33W	
Reno8 5G	July 2022	6.4" 90 Hz Full HD+ (2400×1080) AMOLED	MediaTek Dimensity 1300	256 GB	8/12 GB	50 MP (wide) 8 MP (ultrawide) 2 MP (macro)	32 MP (IMX709)	4500 mAh	80W	
Reno 8 Pro (Reno8 Pro+)	July 2022	6.7" 120 Hz Full HD+ (2412×1080) AMOLED	MediaTek Dimensity 8100 Max	256 GB	8/12 GB	50 MP (wide) 8 MP (ultrawide) 2 MP (macro)	32 MP (IMX709)	4500 mAh	80W	
Reno8 Z 5G (F21s Pro 5G)	August 2022	6.43" Full HD+ (2400×1080) OLED	Qualcomm Snapdragon 695 5G	128/256 GB	8 GB	64 MP (wide) 2 MP (macro) 2 MP (depth)	16 MP	4500 mAh	33W	
Reno8 (F21s Pro)	August 2022	6.43" 90 Hz Full HD+ (2400×1080) AMOLED	Qualcomm Snapdragon 680 4G	256 GB	8 GB	64 MP (wide) 2 MP (microscope) 2 MP (depth)	32 MP (IMX709)	4500 mAh	33W	
Reno8 T	February 2023	6.43" 90 Hz Full HD+ (2400×1080) AMOLED	MediaTek Helio G99	128/256 GB	8 GB	100 MP (wide) 2 MP (microscope) 2 MP (depth)	32 MP (IMX709)	5000 mAh	33W	
Reno8 T 5G	February 2023	6.7" 120 Hz Full HD+ (2412×1080) AMOLED	Qualcomm Snapdragon 695 5G	128/256 GB	8 GB	108 MP (wide) 2 MP (microscope) 2 MP (depth)	32 MP (IMX709)	4800 mAh	67W	

=== Oppo Reno9 ===
Model	Release date	Display	Chipset	Memory		Rear camera	Front camera	Battery	Fast charging	Ref.
Model	Release date	Display	Chipset	ROM	RAM	Rear camera	Front camera	Battery	Fast charging	Ref.
Reno9	November 2022	6.7" 120 Hz Full HD+ (2412×1080) AMOLED	Qualcomm Snapdragon 778G	256/512 GB	8/12 GB	64 MP (wide) 2 MP (depth)	32 MP (IMX709)	4500 mAh	67W	
Reno9 Pro	November 2022	6.7" 120 Hz Full HD+ (2412×1080) AMOLED	MediaTek Dimensity 8100 Max	256/512 GB	16 GB	50 MP (wide) 8 MP (ultrawide)	32 MP (IMX709)	4500 mAh	67W	
Reno9 Pro+	November 2022	6.7" 120 Hz Full HD+ (2412×1080) AMOLED	Qualcomm Snapdragon 8+ Gen 1	256/512 GB	16 GB	50 MP (wide) 8 MP (ultrawide) 2 MP (depth)	32 MP (IMX709)	4700 mAh	80W	

=== Oppo Reno10 ===
Model	Release date	Display	Chipset	Memory		Rear camera	Front camera	Battery	Fast charging	Ref.
Model	Release date	Display	Chipset	ROM	RAM	Rear camera	Front camera	Battery	Fast charging	Ref.
Reno10 (China Version)	May 2023	6.7" 120 Hz Full HD+ (2412×1080) AMOLED	Qualcomm Snapdragon 778G	256/512 GB	8/12 GB	64 MP (wide) 32 MP (telephoto) 8 MP (ultrawide)	32 MP (IMX709)	4600 mAh	80W	
Reno10 Pro (China Version)	May 2023	6.74" 120 Hz 2772×1270 AMOLED	MediaTek Dimensity 8200	256/512 GB	16 GB	50 MP (wide) 32 MP (telephoto) 8 MP (ultrawide)	32 MP (IMX709)	4600 mAh	100W	
Reno10 Pro+	May 2023	6.74" 120 Hz 2772×1270 AMOLED	Qualcomm Snapdragon 8+ Gen 1	128/256/512 GB	12/16 GB	50 MP (wide) 64 MP (periscope telephoto) 8 MP (ultrawide)	32 MP (IMX709)	4700 mAh	100W	
Reno10	July 2023	6.7" 120 Hz Full HD+ (2412×1080) AMOLED	MediaTek Dimensity 7050	128/256 GB	8 GB	64 MP (wide) 32 MP (telephoto) 8 MP (ultrawide)	32 MP (IMX709)	5000 mAh	67W	
Reno10 Pro	July 2023	6.7" 120 Hz Full HD+ (2412×1080) AMOLED	Qualcomm Snapdragon 778G	256 GB	8/12 GB	50 MP (wide) 32 MP (telephoto) 8 MP (ultrawide)	32 MP (IMX709)	4600 mAh	80W	

=== Oppo Reno11 ===
Model	Release date	Display	Chipset	Memory		Rear camera	Front camera	Battery	Fast charging	Ref.
Model	Release date	Display	Chipset	ROM	RAM	Rear camera	Front camera	Battery	Fast charging	Ref.
Reno11 (China Version)	November 2023	6.7" 120 Hz Full HD+ (2412×1080) AMOLED	MediaTek Dimensity 8200	256/512 GB	8/12 GB	50 MP (wide) 32 MP (telephoto) 8 MP (ultrawide)	32 MP (IMX709)	4600 mAh	67W	
Reno11 Pro (China Version)	November 2023	6.74" 120 Hz 2772×1270 AMOLED	Qualcomm Snapdragon 8+ Gen 1	256/512 GB	16 GB	50 MP (wide) 32 MP (telephoto) 8 MP (ultrawide)	32 MP (IMX709)	4600 mAh	80W	
Reno11	January 2024	6.7" 120 Hz Full HD+ (2412×1080) AMOLED	MediaTek Dimensity 7050	128/256 GB	8/12 GB	50 MP (wide) 32 MP (telephoto) 8 MP (ultrawide)	32 MP (IMX709)	5000 mAh	67W	
Reno11 Pro	January 2024	6.7" 120 Hz Full HD+ (2412×1080) AMOLED	MediaTek Dimensity 8200	256/512 GB	12 GB	50 MP (wide) 32 MP (telephoto) 8 MP (ultrawide)	32 MP (IMX709)	4600 mAh	80W	
Reno11 F (F25 Pro)	February 2024	6.7" 120 Hz Full HD+ (2412×1080) AMOLED	MediaTek Dimensity 7050	256 GB	8 GB	64 MP (wide) 8 MP (ultrawide) 2 MP (macro)	32 MP (IMX709)	5000 mAh	67W	
Reno11 A	June 2024	6.7" 120 Hz Full HD+ (2412×1080) AMOLED	MediaTek Dimensity 7050	128GB	8 GB	64 MP (wide) 8 MP (ultrawide) 2 MP (macro)	32 MP (IMX709)	5000 mAh	67W	
Reno11 FS (Reno12 F)	November 2024	6.67" 120 Hz Full HD+ (2400×1080) AMOLED	Qualcomm Snapdragon 685 4G	256 GB	8 GB	50 MP (wide) 8 MP (ultrawide) 2 MP (macro)	32 MP (IMX709)		45W	

=== Oppo Reno12 ===
Model	Release date	Display	Chipset	Memory		Rear camera	Front camera	Battery	Fast charging	Ref.
Model	Release date	Display	Chipset	ROM	RAM	Rear camera	Front camera	Battery	Fast charging	Ref.
Reno12 (China Version)	May 2024	6.7" 120 Hz Full HD+ (2412×1080) AMOLED	MediaTek Dimensity 8250	256/512 GB	12/16 GB	50 MP (wide) 50 MP (telephoto) 8 MP (ultrawide)	50 MP	5000 mAh	80W	
Reno12 Pro (China Version)	May 2024	6.7" 120 Hz Full HD+ (2412×1080) AMOLED	MediaTek Dimensity 9200+	256/512 GB	12/16 GB	50 MP (wide) 50 MP (telephoto) 8 MP (ultrawide)	50 MP	5000 mAh	80W	
Reno12	June 2024	6.7" 120 Hz Full HD+ (2412×1080) AMOLED	MediaTek Dimensity 7300 Energy	256/512 GB	8/12 GB	50 MP (wide) 8 MP (ultrawide) 2 MP (macro)	32 MP	5000 mAh	80W	
Reno12 Pro	June 2024	6.7" 120 Hz Full HD+ (2412×1080) AMOLED	MediaTek Dimensity 7300 Energy	256/512 GB	12 GB	50 MP (wide) 50 MP (telephoto) 8 MP (ultrawide)	50 MP	5000 mAh	80W	
Reno12 F (Reno11 FS)	June 2024	6.67" 120 Hz Full HD+ (2400×1080) AMOLED	Qualcomm Snapdragon 685 4G	256/512 GB	8/12 GB	50 MP (wide) 8 MP (ultrawide) 2 MP (macro)	32 MP (IMX709)	5000 mAh	45W	
Reno12 F 5G	June 2024	6.67" 120 Hz Full HD+ (2400×1080) AMOLED	MediaTek Dimensity 6300	256/512 GB	8/12 GB	50 MP (wide) 8 MP (ultrawide) 2 MP (macro)	32 MP (IMX709)	5000 mAh	45W	
Reno12 FS 5G	June 2024	6.67" 120 Hz Full HD+ (2400×1080) AMOLED	MediaTek Dimensity 6300	512 GB	12 GB	50 MP (wide) 8 MP (ultrawide) 2 MP (macro)	32 MP (IMX709)	5000 mAh	45W	

=== Oppo Reno13 ===
Model	Release date	Display	Chipset	Memory		Rear camera	Front camera	Battery	Fast charging	Ref.
Model	Release date	Display	Chipset	ROM	RAM	Rear camera	Front camera	Battery	Fast charging	Ref.
Reno13	November 2024	6.59" 120 Hz 2760×1256 AMOLED	MediaTek Dimensity 8350	256/512 GB/1 TB	12/16 GB	50 MP (wide) 8 MP (ultrawide)	50 MP	5600 mAh	80W	
Reno13 Pro	November 2024	6.83" 120 Hz Full HD+ 2800×1272 AMOLED	MediaTek Dimensity 8350	256/512 GB/1 TB	12/16 GB	50 MP (wide) 50 MP (telephoto) 8 MP (ultrawide)	50 MP	5800 mAh	80W; 50W Wireless	
Reno13 F	January 2025	6.67" 120 Hz Full HD+ (2400×1080) AMOLED	MediaTek Helio G100	256/512 GB	8 GB	50 MP (wide) 8 MP (ultrawide) 2 MP (macro)	32 MP (IMX709)	5800 mAh	45W	
Reno13 F 5G	January 2025	6.67" 120 Hz Full HD+ (2400×1080) AMOLED	Qualcomm Snapdragon 6 Gen 1	128/256/512 GB	8/12 GB	50 MP (wide) 8 MP (ultrawide) 2 MP (macro)	32 MP (IMX709)	5800 mAh	45W	

=== Oppo Reno14 ===
Model	Release date	Display	Chipset	Memory		Rear camera	Front camera	Battery	Fast charging	Ref.
Model	Release date	Display	Chipset	ROM	RAM	Rear camera	Front camera	Battery	Fast charging	Ref.
Reno14	May 2025	6.59" 120 Hz 2760×1256 AMOLED	MediaTek Dimensity 8350	256/512 GB/1 TB	8/12/16 GB	50 MP (wide) 50 MP (telephoto) 8 MP (ultrawide)	50 MP	6000 mAh	80W	
Reno14 Pro	May 2025	6.83" 120 Hz 2800×1272 AMOLED	MediaTek Dimensity 8450	256/512 GB/1 TB	12/16 GB	50 MP (wide) 50 MP (periscope telephoto) 50 MP (ultrawide)	50 MP	6200 mAh	80W; 50W Wireless	
Reno14 F	July 2025	6.57" 120 Hz 2372×1080 AMOLED	Qualcomm Snapdragon 6 Gen 1	128/256/512 GB	8/12 GB	50 MP (wide) 8 MP (ultrawide) 2 MP (macro)	32 MP	6000 mAh	45W	

=== Oppo Reno15 ===
Model	Release date	Display	Chipset	Memory		Rear camera	Front camera	Battery	Fast charging	Ref.
Model	Release date	Display	Chipset	ROM	RAM	Rear camera	Front camera	Battery	Fast charging	Ref.
Reno15 (China)	November 2025	6.32" 120 Hz 2640×1216 AMOLED	MediaTek Dimensity 8450	256/512 GB/1 TB	12/16 GB	200 MP (wide) 50 MP (telephoto) 50 MP (ultrawide)	50 MP	6200 mAh	80W	
Reno15 Pro (China)	November 2025	6.78" 120 Hz 2772×1272 LTPO AMOLED	MediaTek Dimensity 8450	256/512 GB/1 TB	12/16 GB	200 MP (wide) 50 MP (telephoto) 50 MP (ultrawide)	50 MP	6500 mAh	80W; 50W Wireless	
Reno 15c	December 2025	6.59" 120 Hz 2760x1256 AMOLED	Qualcomm Snapdragon 7 Gen 4	256/512 GB	12 GB	50 MP (wide) 50 MP (telephoto) 8 MP (ultrawide)	50 MP	6500 mAh	80W	
Reno15 F	January 2026	6.57" 120 Hz 2372x1080 AMOLED	Qualcomm Snapdragon 6 Gen 1	128/256/512 GB	8/12 GB	50 MP (wide) 8 MP (ultrawide) 2 MP (macro)	50 MP	7000 mAh	80W	
Reno15 (Global)	January 2026	6.59" 120 Hz 2760x1256 AMOLED	Qualcomm Snapdragon 7 Gen 4	256/512 GB	8/12 GB	50 MP (wide) 50 MP (telephoto) 8 MP (ultrawide)	50 MP	6500 mAh	80W	
Reno15 Pro (Global) (Reno15 Pro Mini)	January 2026	6.32" 120 Hz 2640x1216 AMOLED	MediaTek Dimensity 8450	256/512 GB	12 GB	200 MP (wide) 50 MP (telephoto) 50 MP (ultrawide)	50 MP	6200 mAh	80W	
Reno15 Pro Max (Reno15 Pro (India))	January 2026	6.78" 120 Hz 2772x1272 AMOLED	MediaTek Dimensity 8450	256/512 GB	12 GB	200 MP (wide) 50 MP (telephoto) 50 MP (ultrawide)	50 MP	6500 mAh	80W; 50W Wireless	
Reno15 FS	January 2026	6.57" 120 Hz 2372x1080 AMOLED	Qualcomm Snapdragon 6 Gen 1	256/512 GB	8 GB	50 MP (wide) 8 MP (ultrawide) 2 MP (macro)	50 MP	6500 mAh	80W	

== Oppo Digital ==
=== Media players ===
Model	Release date	Media	Ref.			
Model	Release date	Media	Ref.	BDP-83	May 2009	Blu-ray
BDP-80	January 2010					Blu-ray
BDP-93	December 2010					Blu-ray
BDP-95	February 2011					Blu-ray
BDP-103/D	October 2012					Blu-ray
BDP-105/D	Late 2012					Blu-ray
BDT-101CI	October 26, 2015					Blu-ray
UDP-203	December 12, 2016	Ultra HD Blu-ray				
UDP-205	April 2017	Ultra HD Blu-ray				

== See also ==
- List of Android smartphones
- List of OnePlus products#Smartphones
- List of Realme products#Smartphones
