= Oppo A12 =

2020 Android smartphones from Oppo

Oppo A12 Oppo A12e Oppo A12s
- Brand: Oppo
- Manufacturer: OPPO Electronics
- Type: Smartphone
- Series: OPPO A Series
- First released: A12e: April 3, 2020; 6 years ago A12: April 20, 2020; 6 years ago A12s: July 14, 2020; 6 years ago
- Availability by region: A12e: April 16, 2020; 6 years ago A12: April 20, 2020; 6 years ago A12s: July 26, 2020; 6 years ago
- Predecessor: Oppo A5s; Oppo A11
- Successor: Oppo A15
- Related: Oppo A32; Oppo A52; Oppo A72; Oppo A72 5G; Oppo A92; Oppo A92s
- Compatible networks: List: 2G bands: GSM 850 / 900 / 1800 / 1900; 3G bands: HSDPA 850 / 900 / 2100; 4G bands (LTE): 1, 3, 5, 7, 8, 38, 40, 41
- Form factor: Slate
- Colors: A12: Blue, Black; A12e: Red, Dark Purple; A12s: Flowing Silver, Deep Blue
- Dimensions: A12/A12s: 155.9 mm (6.14 in) H 75.5 mm (2.97 in) W 8.3 mm (0.33 in) D A12e: 156.2 mm (6.15 in) H 75.6 mm (2.98 in) W 8.2 mm (0.32 in) D
- Weight: A12/A12s: 165 g (5.8 oz); A12e: 168 g (5.9 oz)
- Operating system: A12/A12s: Original & Current: Android 9 with ColorOS 6.1; A12e: Original & Current: Android 8.1 with ColorOS 5.1
- System-on-chip: A12/A12s: MediaTek MT6765 Helio P35 (12 nm); A12e: Qualcomm SDM450 Snapdragon 450 (14 nm)
- CPU: A12/A12s: Octa-core (4x2.35 GHz Cortex-A53 & 4x1.8 GHz Cortex-A53); A12e: Octa-core 1.8 GHz Cortex-A53
- GPU: A12/A12s: PowerVR GE8320; A12e: Adreno 506
- Memory: A12: 3/4 GB; A12s/A12e: 3 GB
- Storage: A12: 32/64 GB; A12s: 32 GB; A12e: 64 GB
- Removable storage: Yes, up to 256 GB
- SIM: Dual nano-SIM
- Battery: 4230 mAh
- Charging: 10W
- Rear camera: A12/A12s: Primary: 13 MP, f/2.2, 25mm, FoV 82.3°, 1/3.06", 1.12µm, PDAF; Depth: 2 MP, f/2.4, 1/5.0", 1.75µm; A12e: Primary: 13 MP, f/2.2, 26mm, FoV 80.4°, 1/3.15", 1.12µm, AF; Depth: 2 MP, f/2.4, 1/5.0", 1.75µm; All: LED flash, HDR, panorama; 1080p@30fps
- Front camera: A12: 5 MP, f/2.0, 28mm (wide), FoV 77°, 1/5.0", 1.12µm; A12s: 5 MP, f/2.4, 28mm (wide), FoV 77°, 1/5.0", 1.12µm; A12e: 8 MP, f/2.2, 27mm (wide), FoV 74.5°, 1/4.0", 1.12µm; HDR; 1080p@30fps
- Display: A12: 6.22 in (158 mm); 720 x 1520 px resolution, 19:9 ratio (~270 ppi density); IPS LCD, 450 nits (typ), Corning Gorilla Glass 3 A12s: 6.2 in (160 mm); 720 x 1520 px resolution, 19:9 ratio (~271 ppi density); IPS LCD, 450 nits (typ), Corning Gorilla Glass 3 A12e: 6.2 in (160 mm); 720 x 1520 px resolution, 19:9 ratio (~271 ppi density); IPS LCD
- Sound: Loudspeaker, 3.5 mm auxiliary (headphone jack)
- Connectivity: A12/A12s: Wi-Fi 802.11 a/b/g/n/ac, dual-band, Wi-Fi Direct; Bluetooth 5.0, A2DP, LE; A12e: Wi-Fi 802.11 b/g/n/, Wi-Fi Direct; Bluetooth 4.2, A2DP, LE
- Data inputs: Multi-touch screen; microUSB 2.0, OTG; Fingerprint scanner (rear-mounted) (except A12e); Accelerometer; Gyroscope (except A12e); Proximity sensor; Compass
- Water resistance: None
- Model: A12/A12s: CPH2083, CPH2077; A12e: CPH1853

The Oppo A12 is a series of Android-based smartphones manufactured and marketed by OPPO Electronics, as part of the OPPO A Series. The Oppo A12e (rebranded A3s) was first announced on April 3, 2020, then released on April 16, 2020. Secondly, the A12 was first announced on April 20, 2020 and released at the same time. Finally, the A12s was first announced on July 14, 2020 and released on July 26, 2020.

== Design ==
The A12's body is made of plastic with a 3D Diamond Blaze design and the A12s is made of plastic with a "S" Design and the A12e, made of glossy plastic design is nearly identical to the OPPO A3s. The phone frame is made of plastic. The screen display on the A12/A12s is covered with Corning Gorilla Glass 3 while the A12e does not have the Corning Gorilla Glass Protection. The A12 occupies 82.0% of the phone's front area, while the A12s occupies 81.5% of the front area and the A12e occupies 81.2% of the front area.

On the left side, there are two volume control buttons and a hybrid slot for two SIM cards and a memory card. On the right side, there's the smartphone's power button. On the back of the phone, there is the rear-mounted fingerprint. And the A12e does not have it on the back.

== Specifications ==
=== Hardware ===
The A12/A12s is powered by a MediaTek Helio P35 while the A12e is powered by a Qualcomm Snapdragon 450 processor and the A12/A12s uses the PowerVR GE8320 while the A12e uses the Adreno 506 GPU. The battery has a capacity of 4230 mAh with 10W charging.

The display is an IPS LCD, 6.2" (A12s and A12e) 6.22" (A12) in size, with HD+ (1520 x 720) resolution, 270 ppi (A12) 271 ppi (A12s and A12e) pixel density, and 19:9 aspect ratio.

==== Camera ====
The A12 series features a dual-camera setup with autofocus and 1080p at 30 frames:

- 13 MP, f/2.2 (wide-angle)
- 2 MP, f/2.4 (depth sensor)

The front camera depends, the A12 uses a 5 MP f/2.0, A12s using a 5 MP f/2.4, while the A12e uses a 8 MP f/2.2. All recording at 1080p@30fps.
