= Oppo A91 =

2019 Android smartphones from Oppo

Oppo A91 (Oppo F15 in India)
- Brand: OPPO
- Type: Smartphone
- Series: A/F
- First released: A91: December 20, 2019; 6 years ago F15: January 16, 2020; 6 years ago
- Predecessor: Oppo A9 2020; Oppo F11
- Successor: Oppo A92; Oppo F17
- Related: Oppo A31 (2020)
- Compatible networks: GSM, 3G, 4G (LTE)
- Form factor: Slate
- Colors: A91: Lightening Black, Unicorn White, Blazing Blue, Red; F15: Lightening Black, Unicorn White
- Dimensions: 160.2×73.3×7.9 mm (6.31×2.89×0.31 in)
- Weight: 172 g (6 oz)
- Operating system: Original: Android 9 Pie + ColorOS 6.1; Current: Android 11 + ColorOS 11.1
- System-on-chip: MediaTek MT6771V Helio P70 (12 nm)
- CPU: Octa-core (4×2.1 GHz Cortex-A73 & 4×2 GHz Cortex-A53)
- GPU: Mali-G72 MP3
- Memory: 4/8 GB LPDDR4X
- Storage: 128 GB UFS 2.1
- Removable storage: microSDXC up to 256 GB
- SIM: Dual SIM (Nano-SIM)
- Battery: Non-removable, Li-Po 4015 mAh
- Charging: 20 W fast charging VOOC 3.0
- Rear camera: 48 MP, f/1.8, 26 mm (wide), 1/2", 0.8 μm, PDAF + 8 MP, f/2.3, 119° (ultrawide), 1/4", 1.12 μm + 2 MP, f/2.4 (B/W) 1/5", 1.75 μm + 2 MP, f/2.4, (depth sensor); LED flash, HDR, panorama Video: 1080p@30fps, gyro-EIS
- Front camera: 16 MP, f/2.0, 26 mm (wide), 1/3.06", 1 μm HDR; Video: 1080p@30fps
- Display: AMOLED, 6.4", 2400 × 1080 (FHD+), 20:9, 408 ppi
- Sound: Mono sound
- Connectivity: USB-C 2.0, 3.5 mm Audio, Bluetooth 4.2 (A2DP, LE), NFC (A91), FM radio, Wi-Fi 802.11 a/b/g/n/ac (dual-band, Wi-Fi Direct), GPS, A-GPS, GLONASS, BeiDou
- Other: Fingerprint sensor (under-display, optical), proximity, accelerometer, gyroscope, compass, magnetometer

The Oppo A91 is a mid-range smartphone developed by OPPO, part of the A series. It was introduced on December 20, 2019 in China, alongside the Oppo A8 until its release on December 26, 2019. On January 16, 2020, the smartphone was presented under the name Oppo F15 in India.

== Specifications ==
=== Design ===
The screen is made of Corning Gorilla Glass 5, while the frame and back panel are made of glossy plastic.

The bottom houses the USB-C port, speaker, microphone, and 3.5 mm audio jack, while the top only contains a second microphone. The left side features the volume buttons and a slot for 2 SIM cards and a microSD memory card up to 256 GB. The lock button is located on the right side.

The Oppo A91 was sold in 4 colors: Lightening Black, Unicorn White, Blazing Blue, and Red. The Oppo F15 was sold only in the first two mentioned colors.

=== Processor ===
The Oppo A91 is powered by a MediaTek Helio P70 processor with a Mali-G72 MP3 graphics processor.

=== Battery & Charging ===
The battery has a capacity of 4025 mAh and supports 20 W VOOC 3.0 fast charging, which takes about 30 mins to reach 50%.

=== Cameras ===
The Oppo A91 features a quad main camera consisting of a 48 MP wide-angle lens with an f/1.8 aperture, Anti-Shake technology phase autofocus, an 8 MP ultrawide lens with f/2.2 aperture, and a black-and-white lens and depth sensor, both 2 MP with f/2.4 aperture. The device also features a 16 MP wide-angle front camera with f/2.0 aperture. Both the main and front cameras can record video at 1080p@30fps.

=== Display ===
The display is a 6.4" AMOLED panel with Full HD+ resolution (2400 × 1080), 408 ppi pixel density, a 20:9 aspect ratio, and a waterdrop notch for the front camera. An optical fingerprint scanner is also built under the display.

=== Memory ===
The A91 was only sold in 128GB of internal storage and 4GB/8GB of RAM configurations.

=== Software ===
The smartphone was released running ColorOS 6.1 based on Android 9 Pie and was later updated to ColorOS 11.1 based on Android 11.
