= Oppo Reno5 Lite =

2021 Android smartphones from Oppo

Oppo Reno5 Lite (Oppo F19 Pro in India; Oppo A94; Oppo Reno5 F)
- Brand: Oppo
- Type: Phablet
- Series: Reno / A / F
- First released: A94: March 5, 2021; 5 years ago F19 Pro: March 8, 2021; 5 years ago Reno5 F: March 17, 2021; 5 years ago Reno5 Lite: March 23, 2021; 5 years ago
- Availability by region: Reno 5F; Malaysia: April 15, 2021
- Predecessor: Oppo Reno4 Lite
- Successor: Oppo Reno6 Lite; Oppo Reno11 F Oppo F21 Pro
- Related: Oppo Reno5; Oppo Reno5 Z
- Compatible networks: GSM, 3G, 4G (LTE)
- Form factor: Slate
- Dimensions: 160.1×73.2×7.8 mm (6.30×2.88×0.31 in)
- Weight: 172 g (6 oz)
- Operating system: Original: Android 11 with ColorOS 11.1; Current: Android 13 with ColorOS 13.1
- CPU: MediaTek MT6779V Helio P95 (12 nm), Octa-core (2×2.2 GHz Cortex-A75 & 6×2.0 GHz Cortex-A55)
- GPU: PowerVR GM9446
- Memory: 8 GB LPDDR4X
- Storage: Reno5 Lite & A94 & Reno5 F: 128 GB; F19 Pro: 128 or 256 GB; UFS 2.1
- Removable storage: microSDXC up to 256 GB
- Battery: Non-removable Li-Po 4310 mAh, 30 W fast charging (VOOC 4.0)
- Rear camera: 48 MP Samsung GM1ST, f/1.7, 26 mm (wide), 1/2.0", 0.8µm, PDAF + 8 MP Hynix Hi846, f/2.2, 119˚, 16 mm (ultrawide), 1/4.0", 1.12µm + 2 MP GalaxyCore GC02M1B, f/2.4 (macro) + 2 MP GalaxyCore GC02M1B, f/2.4 (depth); LED flash, HDR, panorama Video: 4K@30fps, 1080p@30/120fps, gyro-EIS
- Front camera: Reno5 Lite & 5 F & A94: 32 MP, f/2.4, 24 mm (wide), 1/2.8", 0.8µm, PDAF; F19 Pro: 16 MP, f/2.4, 26 mm (wide), 1/3.09", 1.0µm, PDAF; HDR; Video: 1080p@30fps
- Display: AMOLED, 6.43", 2400 × 1080 (Full HD+), 20:9, 409 ppi
- Connectivity: USB-C 2.0, 3.5 mm audio jack, Bluetooth 5.1 (A2DP, LE, aptX HD), NFC (Reno5 Lite), Wi-Fi 802.11 a/b/g/n/ac (dual-band, Wi-Fi Direct, hotspot), GPS, A-GPS, GLONASS, BeiDou, Galileo, QZSS
- Other: Fingerprint (under display, optical), proximity, accelerometer, gyroscope, compass

The Oppo Reno5 Lite (Ukraine) is an Android smartphone developed and manufactured by Oppo, belonging to the Reno series as a low-end version of the Oppo Reno5. It was unveiled on March 23, 2021, and went on sale on March 30 of the same year. In other markets, the smartphone was introduced as the Oppo A94 (UAE) or Oppo Reno5 F. Additionally, the Oppo F19 Pro was launched in India, which is a rebranded Reno5 Lite with a lower-resolution front camera.

== Specifications ==
=== Design ===
The front of the device is made of glass, while the body is made of plastic.

The bottom houses a USB-C port, speaker, microphone, and a 3.5 mm audio jack. A secondary microphone is located at the top. The left side contains the volume buttons and a triple-slot tray for two SIM cards and a microSD card (up to 256 GB). The power button is located on the right side.

The Oppo A94, Reno5 F and Reno5 Lite are available in Fluid Black and Fantastic Purple colors, while the Oppo F19 Pro is sold in Fluid Black and Crystal Silver.

=== Platform ===
All smartphones were powered by the MediaTek Helio P95 processor and the PowerVR GM9446 GPU.

=== Battery ===
All devices include a 4310 mAh battery with support for 30 W VOOC 4.0 fast charging.

=== Camera ===
The smartphones are equipped with a quad-camera setup consisting of a 48 MP f/1.7 (wide) main sensor, an 8 MP f/2.2 (ultrawide) sensor with a 119˚ field of view, a 2 MP f/2.4 (macro) lens, and a 2 MP f/2.4 (depth) sensor. The rear camera supports phase-detection autofocus (PDAF) and 4K video recording at 30fps. The F19 Pro features a 16 MP front camera, while other models feature a 32 MP sensor. All models use a wide-angle front lens with an f/2.4 aperture and support 1080p@30fps video recording.

=== Display ===
The display is a 6.4-inch AMOLED panel with a Full HD+ resolution (2400 × 1080), a pixel density of 409 ppi, and a 20:9 aspect ratio. It features a punch-hole cutout for the front camera in the upper left corner and an integrated optical fingerprint scanner.

=== Memory ===
The Oppo A94, Reno5 F and Reno5 Lite are available in an 8/128 GB configuration. The Oppo F19 Pro is available in 8/128 GB and 8/256 GB configurations.

=== Software ===
The smartphones launched with ColorOS 11.1 based on Android 11 and were subsequently updated to ColorOS 13.1 based on Android 13.
