= Oppo A9 2020 =

Android smartphone from Oppo

- Brand: Oppo
- Manufacturer: Oppo Electronics Corporation
- Type: Smartphone
- Family: Oppo A series
- First released: 11 September 2019
- Predecessor: Oppo A9
- Successor: Oppo A72/A92
- Dimensions: 163.6×75.6×9.1 mm (6.44×2.98×0.36 in)
- Weight: 195 g (7 oz)
- Operating system: Original: ColorOS 6.1 (based on Android 9); Current: ColorOS 11.1 (based on Android 11)
- System-on-chip: Qualcomm Snapdragon 665
- CPU: Octa-core (4x2.0 GHz + 4x1.8 GHz)
- GPU: Adreno 610
- Memory: 4GB/8GB RAM
- Storage: 128GB
- Removable storage: 256GB
- Battery: 5000 mAh (Min/Typ)
- Rear camera: Quad-Camera Setup; Primary: Samsung ISOCELL S5KGM1; 48 MP, f/1.8, 26mm, 1/2.25", 0.8µm, PDAF; Ultrawide: OmniVision OV8856; 8 MP, f/2.25, 13mm, 119°, 1/4.0", 1.12µm, AF; Monochrome: OmniVision OV02A1B; 2 MP B/W, f/2.4, 1/5.0", 1.75µm, fixed focus; Depth: OmniVision OV02A1B; 2 MP, f/2.4, 1/5.0", 1.75µm, fixed focus; Dual-LED dual-tone flash, panorama, HDR; 4K@30fps, 1080p@30fps, gyro-EIS
- Front camera: Samsung ISOCELL S5K3P9SP04; 16 MP, f/2.0, 26mm (wide), 1/3.06", 1.0µm; HDR; 1080p@30fps
- Display: Size: 16.5cm (6.5"); Touchscreen: Multi-touch, Capacitive Screen; Resolution: 1600 by 720 pixels Colors: 16 million colors Screen Ratio: 89.0%
- Sound: Dolby Atmos, Dual Stereo Speakers
- Connectivity: GSM/HSPDA/LTE
- Website: www.oppo.com/en/smartphone-a9-2020/

The Oppo A9 2020, along with Oppo A5 2020, are the successors to the Oppo A series. It was launched on 11 September 2019 in India and equipped with 48 MP Ultra Wide Quad Camera, 5000 mAh Ultra Battery and reverse charging capability.

== Specifications ==
=== Hardware ===
The Oppo A9 2020 is powered by an octa-core Qualcomm Snapdragon 665 chipset (4x2.0 GHz Kryo 260 Gold & 4x1.8 GHz Kryo 260 Silver).It features 128 GB of internal storage, which can be expanded by up to 256 GB via a dedicated microSD slot. The device originally launched with ColorOS 6.1, based on Android 9, and supports dual Nano-SIM connectivity.

=== Memory ===
The Oppo A9 2020 comes with 128 GB of internal storage and supports expansion by up to 256 GB via a dedicated microSD card slot. The device utilizes UFS 2.1 storage technology for faster data transfer speeds.

=== Display ===
The Oppo A9 2020 features a 6.5-inch (165 mm) IPS LCD capacitive touchscreen with a resolution of 1600 x 720 pixels (HD+). It incorporates a "waterdrop" notch design and achieves a screen-to-body ratio of 89.0%. The display is also designed to improve visibility under direct sunlight and reduce blue light emissions for eye comfort.

=== Battery ===
The Oppo A9 2020 is powered by a non-removable 5000 mAh Li-Po battery. The device supports reverse charging, allowing it to charge other devices via a wired connection.

=== Camera ===
The Oppo A9 2020 features a total of five cameras. The rear quad-camera setup consists of a 48 MP main sensor (f/1.8 aperture, 1/2.25" sensor size), an 8 MP ultrawide lens (119° field of view), a 2 MP monochrome lens, and a 2 MP depth sensor for portrait photography. On the front, it is equipped with a 16 MP camera that utilizes AI-based software enhancements for selfies.

== Software ==
The Oppo A9 2020 launched with ColorOS 6.1, a customized user interface based on the Android 9.0 Pie operating system. The software includes features such as Game Boost 2.0 for improved gaming performance and a dedicated riding mode for road safety. The device was later made eligible for updates to ColorOS 11.1, based on Android 11.
