= Oppo A16e =

2022 Android smartphone

- Brand: Oppo
- Manufacturer: Oppo
- Type: Smartphone
- Series: Oppo A series
- First released: March 24, 2022; 4 years ago
- Predecessor: Oppo A16k
- Compatible networks: GSM / HSPA / LTE
- Form factor: Slate
- Colors: Black; Blue; White
- Dimensions: 164 mm (6.5 in) H 75.4 mm (2.97 in) W 7.9 mm (0.31 in) D
- Weight: 175 g (6.2 oz)
- Operating system: Android 11, ColorOS 11.1
- System-on-chip: MediaTek MT6762D Helio P22 (12 nm)
- CPU: Octa-core 2.0 GHz Cortex-A53
- GPU: PowerVR GE8320
- Memory: 3 GB / 4 GB
- Storage: 32 GB / 64 GB eMMC 5.1
- Removable storage: microSDXC
- SIM: Dual Nano-SIM
- Battery: Non-removable Li-Po 4230 mAh
- Charging: 10 W wired
- Rear camera: 13 MP, f/2.2, 26mm (wide), 1/3.1", 1.12 µm, PDAF, LED flash, 1080p@30fps
- Front camera: 5 MP, f/2.4, 27mm (wide), HDR, 1080p@30fps
- Display: 6.52 in (166 mm) IPS LCD, 720 × 1600 pixels, 20:9 ratio (~269 ppi density), Corning Gorilla Glass 3
- Model: CPH2421

The Oppo A16e is an entry-level Android smartphone designed and manufactured by Oppo. Announced on March 21, 2022, and released on March 24, 2022 in Indai, the device serves as a budget-oriented addition to the Oppo A series lineup.

== Specifications ==
The smartphone is powered by a MediaTek MT6762D Helio P22 chipset built on a 12 nm process, paired with an octa-core 2.0 GHz Cortex-A53 CPU and a PowerVR GE8320 GPU. It is offered in configuration options of either 3 GB of RAM with 32 GB of internal storage or 4 GB of RAM with 64 GB of eMMC 5.1 storage, both expandable via a dedicated microSDXC slot. Out of the box, the device runs on ColorOS 11.1 based on Android 11.

On the front, the device houses a 6.52-inch IPS LCD panel with an HD+ resolution of 720 × 1600 pixels (~269 ppi) protected by Corning Gorilla Glass 3. For photography, it features a single 13 MP primary rear camera with an LED flash and a 5 MP front-facing selfie camera housed within a teardrop notch. Connectivity features include 4G LTE support, dual-band Wi-Fi, Bluetooth 5.0, a 3.5 mm headphone jack, microUSB 2.0 with OTG support, and a non-removable 4,230 mAh lithium-polymer battery capable of 10 W charging.
