= Oppo A52 =

2020 Android smartphone developed by OPPO

- Brand: Oppo
- Manufacturer: OPPO Electronics
- Type: Smartphone
- Series: Oppo A Series
- First released: April 20, 2020; 6 years ago
- Availability by region: April 20, 2020; 6 years ago
- Predecessor: Oppo A5 (2020)
- Successor: Oppo A53 (2020)
- Related: Oppo A12; Oppo A32; Oppo A72; Oppo A92
- Compatible networks: List: Technology: GSM / HSPA / LTE; 2G bands: GSM 850 / 900 / 1800 / 1900; 3G bands: HSDPA 850 / 900 / 2100; 4G bands (LTE): 1, 3, 5, 7, 8, 20, 28, 38, 40, 41 - Version 1; 1, 3, 5, 7, 8, 38, 40, 41 - Version 2; 1, 3, 5, 8, 38, 40, 41 - Version 3; 1, 3, 5, 8, 34, 38, 40, 41 - China; Speed: HSPA, LTE
- Form factor: Slate
- Colors: Twilight Black; Stream White
- Dimensions: 162 mm (6.4 in) H 75.5 mm (2.97 in) W 8.9 mm (0.35 in) D
- Weight: 192 g (6.8 oz)
- Operating system: Original: Android 10 with ColorOS 7.1; Current: Android 11 with ColorOS 11.1
- System-on-chip: Qualcomm SM6125 Snapdragon 665 (11 nm Samsung 11LPP)
- CPU: Octa-core (4x2.0 GHz Kryo 260 Gold & 4x1.8 GHz Kryo 260 Silver)
- GPU: Adreno 610 (950 MHz)
- Modem: Snapdragon X12 LTE
- Memory: 4 / 6 / 8 GB RAM (LPDDR4X)
- Storage: 64 / 128 GB (UFS 2.1)
- Removable storage: microSDXC, expandable up to 256 GB
- SIM: Dual nano-SIM
- Battery: 5000 mAh lithium-polymer
- Charging: 18 W Fast charging
- Rear camera: Quad-Camera Setup; Primary: 12 MP, f/1.7, (wide-angle), 1/2.8", 1.25µm, PDAF; Ultrawide: 8 MP, f/2.2, FoV 119°, 1/4.0", 1.12µm, FF; Macro: 2 MP, f/2.4, 1/5.0", 1.75µm, FF; Depth: 2 MP, f/2.4, 1/5.0", 1.75µm; Camera features: LED flash, HDR, Panorama; Video recording: 4K@30fps, 1080p@30/60/120fps, gyro-EIS
- Front camera: Global: 16 MP, f/2.0, (wide-angle), 1/3.06", 1.0µm, FF; China: 8 MP, f/2.0, (wide-angle), 1/4.0", 1.12µm, FF; Camera features: HDR; Video recording: 1080p@30fps
- Display: 6.5 in (170 mm); 1080 x 2400 px resolution, 20:9 ratio (~405 ppi density); IPS LCD, 60Hz, 480 nits (typ)
- Sound: Stereo speakers, 3.5 mm auxiliary (headphone jack) (24-bit/192kHz Hi-Res audio)
- Connectivity: Bluetooth 5.0 (A2DP, LE, aptX HD), FM radio, Wi-Fi 802.11 a/b/g/n/ac, (dual-band, Wi-Fi Direct, hotspot), GPS, A-GPS, GLONASS, GALILEO, BDS
- Data inputs: Multi-touch screen; Type-C 2.0, OTG; Fingerprint scanner (side-mounted); Accelerometer; Ambient light sensor; Proximity sensor; Compass; Magnetic induction sensor
- Water resistance: None
- Model: CPH2061 (Global); CPH2069 (Global); PADM00 (China); PDAM10 (China)
- Development status: Discontinued
- Made in: China

The Oppo A52 is an Android smartphone developed by OPPO, part of the A series. The phone model is labeled as CPH2061 and CPH2069 for the global version, and PADM00 and PDAM10 for the Chinese version.

The global release of the Oppo A52 was announced on April 20, 2020.

== Design ==
The smartphone's body is made of plastic with a glossy finish. The phone frame is made of matte plastic. The screen display is covered with Corning Gorilla Glass 3 and occupies 83.4% of the phone's front area.

On the left side, there are two volume control buttons and a hybrid slot for two SIM cards and a memory card. On the right side, there's the smartphone's power button with a built-in fingerprint scanner.

The Oppo A52 is sold in two colors: Stream White and Twilight Black.

== Technical specifications ==
=== Hardware ===
The smartphone is powered by a Qualcomm Snapdragon 665 processor and Adreno 610 GPU. The non-removable battery has a capacity of 5000 mAh with 18 W fast charging support.

The display is an IPS LCD, 6.5" in size, with Full HD+ (2400 × 1080) resolution, 405 ppi pixel density, a 20:9 aspect ratio, and a 90 Hz refresh rate.

The A52 was available at 64GB 4GB RAM, 128GB 4GB RAM, 128GB 6GB RAM, and 128GB 8GB RAM USF 2.1 configurations. In Ukraine, the Oppo A52 is sold with 4 GB of RAM and 64 GB of internal storage.

==== Camera ====
The Oppo A52's vertical rectangular camera module features a quad main camera with autofocus and 4K@30fps video recording capability:

- 12 MP, f/1.7 (wide-angle)
- 8 MP, f/2.0 ultrawide-angle lens
- 2 MP, f/2.4 (macro)
- 2 MP, f/2.4 (depth sensor)

The Oppo A52's front camera has an 8 MP (wide-angle) resolution, records video at 1080p@30fps, and is located in the upper left corner of the phone's screen.

Due to its top-tier camera specifications, the Oppo A52 is listed among the best budget smartphones of 2021.

==== Sound ====
The Oppo A52 is equipped with stereo speakers, with the earpiece serving as the second speaker.

=== Software ===
The smartphone runs on the proprietary ColorOS 7 firmware, based on Android 10. It received ColorOS 11 as its final update based on Android 11. It is set to receive security updates through to September 2027.

== See also ==
- Infinix Note 7
- Moto G (2020)
- Vivo Y50
