= Oppo A73 (2020) =

Android smartphone manufactured by OPPO

Oppo A73 (Oppo F17 in India)
- Brand: OPPO
- Manufacturer: OPPO Electronics
- Type: Smartphone
- Series: Oppo A/F
- First released: F17: September 2, 2020; 5 years ago A73: October 5, 2020; 5 years ago
- Predecessor: Oppo A72; Oppo F15
- Successor: Oppo A74
- Related: Oppo A73 5G; Oppo F17 Pro
- Compatible networks: GSM, 3G, 4G (LTE)
- Form factor: Slate
- Dimensions: 159.8×72.9×7.45 mm (6.291×2.870×0.293 in)
- Weight: 163 g (6 oz)
- Operating system: Initial: Android 10 with ColorOS 7.2 Current: Android 11 with ColorOS 11
- CPU: Qualcomm Snapdragon 662 (11 nm), Octa-core (4×2.3 GHz Kryo 260 Gold & 4×1.8 GHz Kryo 260 Silver)
- GPU: Adreno 610
- Memory: A73: 4/6 GB; F17: 4/6/8 GB; LPDDR4X
- Storage: A73: 128 GB; F17: 64/128 GB; UFS 2.1
- Removable storage: microSDXC up to 256 GB
- Battery: Non-removable Li-Po 4015 mAh
- Charging: 30 W fast charging, 50% in 30 min, 100% in 53 min (claimed); VOOC 4.0
- Rear camera: 16 MP OmniVision OV16A10, f/2.2, (wide), 1/3.06", PDAF + 8 MP, f/2.2, 120˚ (ultrawide), 1/4.0", 1.12 µm + 2 MP, f/2.4, (depth) + 2 MP, f/2.4, (depth) LED flash, HDR, panorama Video: 1080p@30fps
- Front camera: 16 MP, f/2.0, 26 mm (wide), 1/3.1", 1.0 µm HDR Video: 1080p@30fps
- Display: AMOLED, 6.44", 2400 × 1080 (Full HD+), 20:9, 409 ppi
- Connectivity: USB-C 2.0, 3.5 mm audio jack, Bluetooth 5.0 (A2DP, LE, aptX), NFC (A73), FM radio, Wi-Fi 802.11 a/b/g/n/ac (dual-band, Wi-Fi Direct, hotspot), GPS, A-GPS, GLONASS, GALILEO, BeiDou
- Other: Fingerprint sensor (under-display, optical), proximity sensor, accelerometer, gyroscope, compass, pedometer

The Oppo A73 is a smartphone developed by OPPO, belonging to the A series. It was announced on October 5, 2020. On September 2 of the same year, the Oppo F17 (along with the F17 Pro) was introduced in India, which is a rebranded Oppo A73.

== Specifications ==
=== Design & build ===
The screen is made of Corning Gorilla Glass 3. The back panel is made of artificial leather and the side frame is made of plastic.

At the bottom, there is a USB-C port, a speaker, a microphone, and a 3.5 mm audio jack. A second microphone is located at the top. On the left side are the volume buttons and a slot for two SIM cards and a microSD card up to 256 GB. The power button is located on the right side.

The color options differ from the following models:

- The Oppo A73 is sold in Navy Blue and Classic Silver colors.
- In India, the Oppo F17 is sold in three colors: Classic Silver, Navy Blue, and Dynamic Orange.

=== Platform ===
Both smartphones are powered by a Qualcomm Snapdragon 662 processor and an Adreno 610 GPU.

=== Battery ===
The battery has a capacity of 4015 mAh and supports 30 W VOOC 4.0 fast charging.

=== Cameras ===
The smartphone features a quad main camera setup: 16 MP, f/2.2 (wide) + 8 MP, f/2.2 (ultrawide) + 2 MP, f/2.4 (depth) + 2 MP, f/2.4 (depth) with phase-detection autofocus and the ability to record video at 1080p@30fps. The front camera has a resolution of 16 MP, an f/2.0 aperture (wide), and can record video at 1080p@30fps.

=== Display ===
The display is a 6.44" AMOLED panel with Full HD+ resolution (2400 × 1080), a pixel density of 409 ppi, a 20:9 aspect ratio, and a waterdrop notch for the front camera. The fingerprint scanner is also built under the display.

=== Memory ===
- The Oppo A73 is sold in 4/128 and 6/128 GB configurations.
- The Oppo F17 is sold in 4/64, 4/128, 6/128, and 8/128 GB configurations.

=== Software ===
The smartphones were released with ColorOS 7.2 UI with Android 10 operating system.
