= Oppo A53 =

Budget smartphones manufactured by OPPO

Oppo A53 (2020) Oppo A53s (Oppo A32 in China; Oppo A33 (2020))
- Manufacturer: OPPO Electronics
- Type: Smartphone
- Series: Oppo A
- First released: A53: August 25, 2020; 5 years ago A32: September 10, 2020; 5 years ago A33: September 28, 2020; 5 years ago A53s: October 12, 2020; 5 years ago
- Predecessor: Oppo A52; Oppo A53; Oppo A33
- Successor: Oppo A54; Oppo A54s
- Related: Oppo A53 5G; Oppo A53s 5G; Oppo A73 (2020)
- Compatible networks: GSM, 3G, 4G (LTE)
- Form factor: Slate
- Dimensions: 163.9×75.1×8.4 mm (6.45×2.96×0.33 in)
- Weight: 186 g (7 oz)
- Operating system: Initial: Android 10 with ColorOS 7.2; Current: Android 12 with ColorOS 12.1
- System-on-chip: Qualcomm SM4250 Snapdragon 460 (11 nm)
- CPU: Octa-core (4×1.8 GHz Kryo 240 & 4×1.6 GHz Kryo 240)
- GPU: Adreno 610
- Memory: A53: 4/6 GB; A53s: 4 GB; A32: 4/8 GB; A33: 3/4 GB; LPDDR4X
- Storage: A53: 64/128 GB; A53s & A32: 128 GB; A33: 32 GB; UFS 2.1
- Removable storage: microSDXC up to 256 GB
- Battery: Non-removable Li-Po 5000 mAh
- Charging: 18W fast charging
- Rear camera: 13 MP OmniVision OV13B10, f/2.2, 25mm (wide), 1/3.06", 1.12 µm, PDAF + 2 MP GalaxyCore GC02K0, f/2.4, (macro) + 2 MP GalaxyCore GC02M1B, f/2.4, (depth); LED flash, HDR, panorama Video: 1080p@30fps
- Front camera: A53: 16 MP, f/2.0 (wide), 1/3.06", 1.0 µm A53s/A32/A33: 8 MP, f/2.0 (wide); HDR; Video: 1080p@30fps
- Display: IPS LCD, 6.5", 1600 × 720 (HD+), 20:9, 270 ppi, 90 Hz
- Connectivity: USB-C 2.0, 3.5 mm jack, Bluetooth 5.0 (A2DP, LE, aptX HD), FM radio, Wi-Fi 802.11 a/b/g/n/ac (dual-band, Wi-Fi Direct, hotspot), GPS, A-GPS, GLONASS, Galileo, BeiDou
- Other: Rear-mounted fingerprint scanner, proximity sensor, accelerometer, gyroscope, compass

The Oppo A53 (2020) and Oppo A53s are budget LTE smartphones developed by OPPO as part of their A series. The Oppo A53 was introduced on August 25, 2020, while the A53s followed on October 12 of the same year. The primary difference between the models is the front-facing camera. In certain markets, the Oppo A53s is sold under the names Oppo A32 and Oppo A33 (2020). The A53 (2020) was the first smartphone to be powered by the Snapdragon 460 SoC.

In the Philippines, it was released on November 7, 2020, along with the Oppo A12 from manufacturer's online stores as well as e-commerce stores like Shoppe or Lazada. It was available at Fancy Blue and Electric Black color options.

== Specifications ==
=== Design ===
The display is constructed from glass, while the body is made of glossy plastic. It was available at the following color options depending on the model:

- A53 (2020) - Fairy White, Electric Black, and Fancy Blue
- A53s - All except Fairy White
- A32 (China) - Mint Green, Electric Black, and Fancy Blue
- A33 (2020) Moonlight Black and Mint Cream

The bottom features a USB-C port, speaker, microphone, and a 3.5 mm audio jack. The left side contains the volume buttons and a slot for two SIM cards and a microSD card up to 256 GB. The right side houses the power button. The fingerprint scanner is located on the rear panel.

=== Hardware ===
The smartphones are powered by a Qualcomm Snapdragon 460 SoC and an Adreno 610 GPU. Besides the SoC, it also has an octa-core Kryo 240 CPU with clocking speeds at 1.6-1.8GHz respectively. The devices feature a 5000 mAh battery with support for 18W fast charging. For the storage configurations, the Oppo A53 (2020) was available in 4/64, 4/128, and 6/128 GB configurations; the A53s in 4/128 GB; the A32 in 4/128 and 8/128 GB; and the A33 (2020) in 3/32 and 4/32 GB.

The device uses a 6.5-inch IPS LCD with HD+ resolution (1600 × 720), a pixel density of 270 ppi, a 20:9 aspect ratio, and a 90 Hz refresh rate. It features a hole-punch cutout for the front camera in the top-left corner.

The smartphones are equipped with stereo speakers, with the earpiece doubling as a second speaker.

=== Cameras ===
The smartphones feature a triple rear camera setup consisting of a 13 MP, f/2.2 (wide), a 2 MP, f/2.4 (macro), a 2 MP, f/2.4 (depth) with phase-detection autofocus and 1080p video recording at 30fps. The Oppo A53's front camera has a resolution of 16 MP, while the other models feature an 8 MP sensor. Both have an f/2.0 aperture, use wide-angle lenses, and support 1080p video at 30fps.

=== Software ===
The smartphones were launched with ColorOS 7.2 based on Android 10 and have been updated to ColorOS 12.1 based on Android 12.
