= Oppo Reno4 Z =

2020 smartphones manufactured by OPPO

Oppo Reno4 Z 5G (Oppo A92s)
- Brand: OPPO
- Type: Phablet
- Series: Reno / A
- First released: A92s: April 20, 2020; 6 years ago Reno4 Z: September 29, 2020; 5 years ago
- Predecessor: Oppo Reno2 Z
- Successor: Oppo Reno5 Z Oppo A93 5G
- Related: Oppo Reno4; Oppo Reno4 SE; Oppo Reno4 Lite; Oppo A92
- Compatible networks: GSM, 3G, 4G (LTE), 5G
- Form factor: Slate
- Dimensions: 163.8×75.5×8.1 mm (6.45×2.97×0.32 in)
- Weight: 184 g (6 oz)
- Operating system: Initial: Android 10 with ColorOS 7.2; Current: Android 11 with ColorOS 11
- CPU: MediaTek MT6873V Dimensity 800 (7 nm), Octa-core (4×2.0 GHz Cortex-A76 & 4×2.0 GHz Cortex-A55)
- GPU: Mali-G57 MC4
- Memory: Reno4 Z: 8 GB; A92s: 6/8 GB; LPDDR4X
- Storage: Reno4 Z: 128 GB; A92s: 128/256 GB; UFS 2.1
- Battery: Non-removable Li-Po 4000 mAh, 18 W fast charging
- Rear camera: 48 MP Sony IMX 586, f/1.7, 26 mm (wide), 1/2.0", 0.8 μm, PDAF + 8 MP, f/2.2, 119° (ultrawide), 1/4.0", 1.12 μm + 2 MP, f/2.4 (macro) + 2 MP, f/2.4 (depth sensor); LED flash, HDR, panorama Video: 4K@30fps, 1080p@30/120fps (A92s), gyro-EIS
- Front camera: 16 MP, f/2.0, 26 mm (wide), 1/3.06", 1.0 μm + 2 MP, f/2.4 (depth sensor); HDR; Video: 1080p@30fps
- Display: LTPS LCD, 6.57", 2400 × 1080 (Full HD+), 20:9, 401 ppi, 120 Hz
- Connectivity: USB-C 2.0, 3.5 mm audio jack, Bluetooth 5.0 (A92s) / 5.1 (A2DP, LE, aptX HD (Reno4 Z)), NFC, Wi-Fi 802.11 a/b/g/n/ac (dual-band, Wi-Fi Direct, hotspot), GPS, A-GPS, GLONASS, BeiDou, GALILEO, QZSS
- Other: Fingerprint sensor (side-mounted), proximity sensor, accelerometer, gyroscope, compass

The Oppo Reno4 Z 5G is an Android smartphone that was manufactured by OPPO, part of the Reno series lineup. It was announced on September 29, 2020, and initially launched on October 15, 2020. On April 20, 2020, the Oppo A92s was announced.

== Availability ==
The Reno4 Z 5G went available in the Philippines on October 28, 2020, exclusively on Globe Telecom and Smart markets. It also comes with a free Rock Space EB51 at 3,199 pesos.

== Specifications ==
=== Design & hardware ===
The back and frame is made of plastic. Both smartphones have the same dimensions at 163.8 x 75.5 x 8.1 mm.

It was available at multiple color options depending on the following models:

- Reno4 Z - Ink Black, Dew White
- A92s - Black, White, Pink

In the front, it has an IPS LCD display sizing at 6.57 inches, with 120Hz refresh rate, resolution at 1080 × 2400 px (20:9), and a pixel density of 401 ppi. The Reno4 Z's front is protected with the Corning Gorilla Glass 3+.

Both smartphones were powered by a MediaTek Dimensity 800 processor with a Mali -G57 MC4 graphics processor. The battery, which is lithium polymer, has a capacity of 4000 mAh, with 18W fast charging support. The Reno4 Z was only sold in 8/128 GB configuration, while the A92s was sold in 6/128, 8/128, and 8/256 GB internal strorage configurations.

Both smartphones are featured with a quad camera with 48MP (f/1.7) main (wide-angle), 8MP (f/2.2) ultra-wide, 2MP (f/2.4) macro lens, and a 2MP (f/2.4) depth sensor with PDAF and can record up to 1080p@30fps or 4K@30fps. It also featured a dual front camera with a 16MP (f/2.0) (wide-angle) main front and 2MP (f/2.4) depth sensor and can record up to 1080p@30fps.

=== Software ===
Both smartphones were originally released on ColorOS 7.2 based on Android 10 and were updated to ColorOS 12 based on Android 12.
