= Oppo Reno7 =

Android smartphone series manufacutred by Oppo

Oppo Reno7 (Oppo F21 Pro in India) Oppo Reno7 5G (Oppo Find X5 Lite) Oppo Reno7 5G (China) Oppo Reno7 SE Oppo Reno7 Pro Oppo Reno8 (Oppo F21s Pro in India) OnePlus Nord CE 2 5G
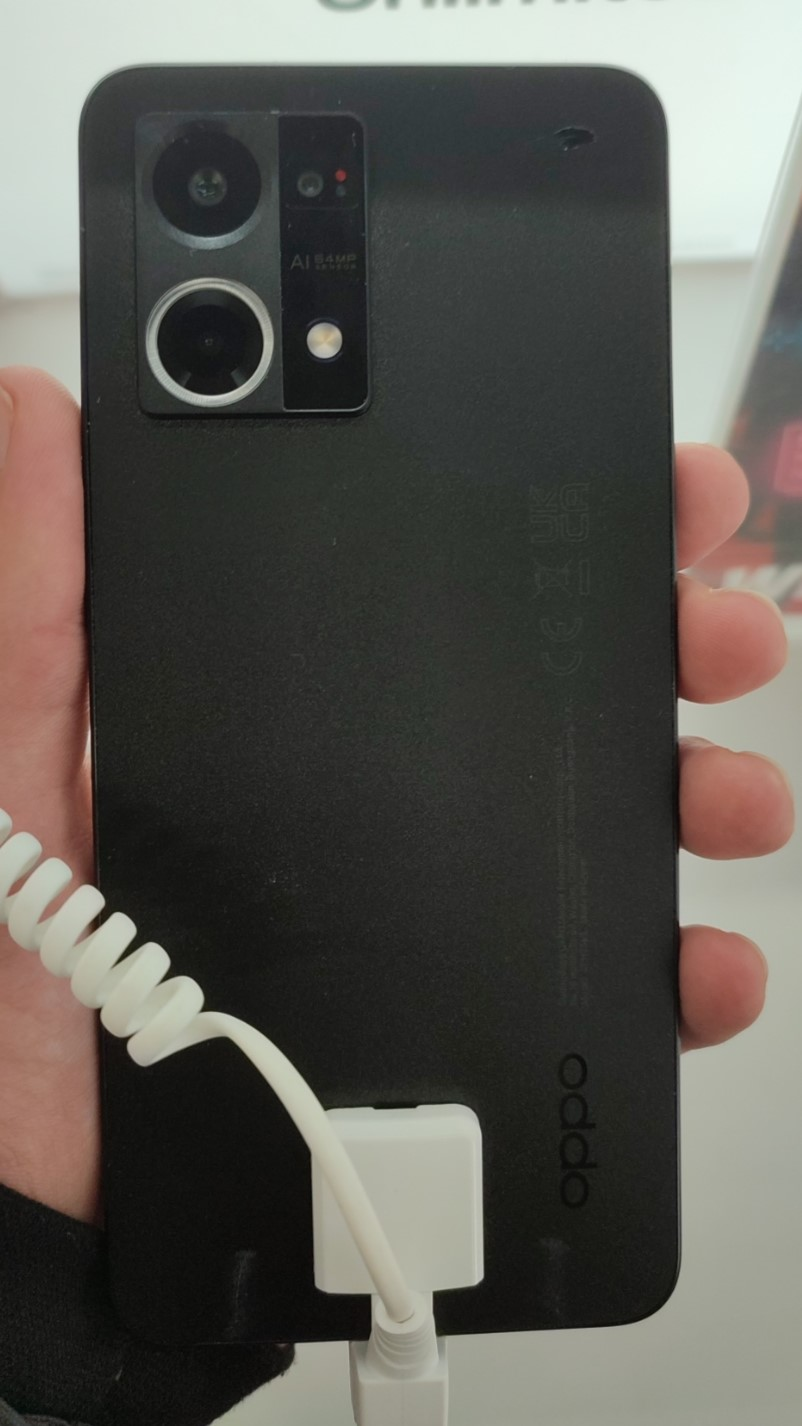
- Oppo Reno7 in Cosmic Black
- Brand: OPPO; OnePlus
- Manufacturer: OPPO Electronics
- Type: Smartphone
- Series: Oppo Reno/F/Find; OnePlus Nord
- First released: Reno7 5G (China)/SE/Pro: November 25, 2021; 4 years ago Reno7 5G: February 4, 2022; 4 years ago OnePlus Nord CE 2 5G: February 4, 2022; 4 years ago Find X5 Lite: February 24, 2022; 4 years ago Reno7: March 29, 2022; 4 years ago F21 Pro: April 12, 2022; 4 years ago Reno8: August 17, 2022; 4 years ago F21s Pro: September 15, 2022; 3 years ago
- Predecessor: Oppo Reno6; Oppo Reno4 SE; Oppo F19 Pro; Oppo Find X3 Lite; OnePlus Nord CE 5G
- Successor: Oppo Reno8 5G; Oppo Reno10; OnePlus Nord CE 3 5G
- Compatible networks: Reno7/Reno8/F21 Pro: GSM, 3G, 4G (LTE); Reno7 5G/SE/Pro/Find X5 Lite/OnePlus Nord CE 2: GSM, 3G, 4G (LTE), 5G
- Form factor: Slate
- Dimensions: Reno7/F21 Pro: 159.9 × 73.2 × 7.5 mm Reno7 5G/Find X5 Lite/OnePlus Nord CE 2 5G: 160.6 × 73.2 × 7.8 mm Reno7 5G (China): 156.8 × 72.1 × 7.6 mm Reno7 SE: 160.2 × 73.2 × 7.5 mm Reno7 Pro: 158.2 × 73.2 × 7.5 mm Reno8/F21s Pro: 159.9 × 73.2 × 7.7 mm
- Weight: Reno7/F21 Pro: 175 g Reno7 5G/Find X5 Lite/OnePlus Nord CE 2 5G: 173 g Reno7 5G (China): 185 g Reno7 SE: 171 g Reno7 Pro: 180 g Reno8/F21s Pro: 182 g
- Operating system: Reno7/Reno8/F21 Pro/F21s Pro: Initial: Android 12 + ColorOS 12.1; Current: Android 14 + ColorOS 14; Reno7 5G/SE/Pro/Find X5 Lite: Initial: Android 11 + ColorOS 12; Current: Android 13 + ColorOS 13.1; OnePlus Nord CE 2 5G: Initial: Android 11 + OxygenOS 11; Current: Android 13 + OxygenOS 13
- System-on-chip: Reno7/Reno8/F21 Pro/F21s Pro: Qualcomm SM6225 Snapdragon 680 4G (6 nm); Reno7 5G/SE/Find X5 Lite/OnePlus Nord CE 2 5G: MediaTek MT6893 Dimensity 900 (6 nm); Reno7 5G (China): Qualcomm SM7325 Snapdragon 778G (6 nm); Reno7 Pro: MediaTek MT6893 Dimensity 1200 Max (6 nm)
- CPU: Reno7/Reno8/F21 Pro/F21s Pro: Octa-core (4×2.4 GHz Kryo 265 Gold & 4×1.9 GHz Kryo 265 Silver); Reno7 5G/SE/Find X5 Lite/OnePlus Nord CE 2 5G: Octa-core (2×2.4 GHz Cortex-A78 & 6×2.0 GHz Cortex-A55); Reno7 5G (China): Octa-core (4×2.4 GHz Kryo 670 & 4×1.9 GHz Kryo 670); Reno7 Pro: Octa-core (1×3.0 GHz Cortex-A78 & 3×2.6 GHz Cortex-A78 & 4×2.0 GHz Cortex-A55)
- GPU: Reno7/Reno8/F21 Pro/F21s Pro: Adreno 610; Reno7 5G/SE/Find X5 Lite/OnePlus Nord CE 2 5G: Mali-G68 MC4; Reno7 5G (China): Adreno 642L; Reno7 Pro: Mali-G77 MC9
- Memory: Reno7/OnePlus Nord CE 2 5G: 6/8 GB; Reno7/5G/SE/Reno8/F21 Pro/F21s Pro/Find X5 Lite: 8 GB; Reno7 5G (China)/Pro: 8/12 GB; LPDDR4X
- Storage: Reno7: 128/256 GB UFS 2.2; Reno7 5G/SE/Reno8/Find X5 Lite: 256 GB UFS 2.2; Reno7 5G (China): 128/256 GB UFS 2.1; Reno7 Pro: 256 GB UFS 3.1; F21 Pro/F21s Pro/OnePlus Nord CE 2 5G: 128 GB UFS 2.2
- Removable storage: Reno7/5G/Reno8/Find X5 Lite/OnePlus Nord CE 2 5G/F21 Pro/F21s Pro: microSDXC up to 256 GB; Reno7 5G (China)/SE/Pro: None
- Battery: Non-removable, Li-Po 4500 mAh
- Charging: Reno7/Reno8/F21 Pro/F21s Pro: 33 W fast charging Reno7 5G/Pro/Find X5 Lite/OnePlus Nord CE 2 5G: 65 W fast charging All models: SuperVOOC 2.0
- Rear camera: Reno7/Reno8/F21 Pro/F21s Pro: 64 MP, f/1.7, 26 mm (wide), 1/2.0", 0.7 µm, PDAF + 2 MP, f/3.3 (microscope) + 2 MP, f/2.4 (depth); Reno7 5G/Find X5 Lite/OnePlus Nord CE 2 5G: 64 MP, f/1.7, 26 mm (wide), 1/2.0", 0.7 µm, PDAF + 8 MP, f/2.2, 119˚ (ultrawide), 1/4", 1.12 µm + 2 MP, f/2.4 (macro); Reno7 SE: 48 MP Sony IMX586, f/1.7, 26 mm (wide), 1/2.0", 0.8 µm, PDAF + 2 MP, f/2.4 (macro) + 2 MP, f/2.4 (depth); Reno7 Pro: 50 MP Sony IMX586, f/1.8, 24 mm (wide), 1/1.56", 1.0 µm, PDAF + 8 MP, f/2.2, 119˚ (ultrawide), 1/4", 1.12 µm + 2 MP, f/2.4 (macro); LED flash, HDR, panorama Video: 4K@30fps, 1080p@30/60/120 (except Reno7/F21 Pro) fps, gyro-EIS
- Front camera: Reno7/5G/Reno8/F21 Pro/F21s Pro/Find X5 Lite: 32 MP Sony IMX709, f/2.4, 24 mm (wide), 1/2.74", 0.8 µm Reno7 Pro: 32 MP, f/2.4, 22 mm (wide); Reno7 SE/OnePlus Nord CE 2 5G: 16 MP, f/2.4, 27 mm (wide), 1.0 µm HDR; Video: 1080p@30fps, gyro-EIS
- Display: All models: AMOLED, 2400 × 1080 (FullHD+) 20:9, 90 Hz; Reno7/5G/SE/Reno8/F21 Pro/F21s Pro/Find X5 Lite: 6.43", 409 ppi Reno 7 Pro: 6.55", 402 ppi, HDR10+

The Oppo Reno7 is a line of Android mid-range smartphones developed, designed, and marketed by OPPO, belonging to the Reno series. The global lineup consists of the Oppo Reno7, Reno7 5G, Reno7 Pro, and Reno7 Lite/Reno7 Z, while the Chinese lineup includes the Reno7 5G, Reno7 Pro, and Reno7 SE.

The global version of the Oppo Reno7 5G and Reno7 SE are very similar models, but feature different camera setups and element placement on the body. Also under the OnePlus brand, the OnePlus Nord CE 2 5G was released, which is almost a full copy of the Oppo Reno7 5G, but with the front camera from the Reno7 SE. In some European countries, the Oppo Reno7 5G is sold under the name Oppo Find X5 Lite.

In India, the Reno7 is sold as the Oppo F21 Pro.

On 17 August 2022, the Oppo Reno8 was introduced, which mainly differs from the Oppo Reno7 in its rear panel design. In India, the Reno8 was introduced on 15 September of the same year alongside the Oppo F21s Pro 5G as the Oppo F21s Pro.

Officially in Ukraine, only the Oppo Reno7 and OnePlus Nord CE 2 5G were sold.

== Design ==
The screen is made of Corning Gorilla Glass 5. On the Reno7, the rear panel is made of faux leather in Sunset Orange, and in cosmic black—glass; on the Reno7 5G, 7 SE, and Reno8—plastic; and on the Chinese Reno7 5G and 7 Pro—glass. The frame on the Chinese Reno7 5G and 7 Pro is made of aluminum, while on all other models it is plastic.

All models in the Reno7 series, except the Reno7 5G and 7 SE, received flat edges.

A notable design feature of several smartphones in the series and the Reno8 is an RGB indicator light on the rear panel, which on the Reno7 and Reno8 surrounds the microscope camera as a ring light, and on the Oppo Reno7 Pro surrounds the camera module.

In design, the Oppo Reno7 5G and Reno7 SE differ only in the arrangement of elements, while on the OnePlus Nord CE 2 5G, the camera bump transition is styled similarly to the Oppo Find X3.

On the Reno7, 7 5G, and OnePlus Nord CE 2 5G, the bottom houses a USB-C port, speaker, microphone, and a 3.5 mm audio jack. The top houses a secondary microphone. The left side features volume control buttons and a slot for two SIM cards and a microSD card up to 256 GB. The right side features the power button.

On the Chinese versions of the Reno7 5G, 7 Pro, and 7 SE, the bottom houses a USB-C port, speaker, microphone, and dual-SIM card slot. The top houses a secondary microphone. The left side features volume control buttons. The right side features the power button.

The Oppo Reno7/F21 Pro was sold in Cosmic Black and Sunset Orange.

The Oppo Reno7 5G was sold in Starlight Black and Startrails Blue.

The Oppo Reno7 Pro was sold in 3 colors: Starlight Black, Startrails Blue, and Gold.

The Oppo Reno8/F21s Pro was sold in Dawn Gold and Starlight Black.

The OnePlus Nord CE 2 5G was sold in Gray Mirror and Bahama Blue.

== Specifications ==
=== Hardware ===
The smartphones feature an AMOLED screen, FullHD+ (2400 × 1080) with a 20:9 aspect ratio, 90 Hz refresh rate, and a circular punch-hole cutout for the front camera located in the top left corner.

On the Oppo Reno7 Pro, the display measures 6.55" with a pixel density of 402 ppi, while other models measure 6.43" and 409 ppi respectively. The Reno7 Pro and OnePlus Nord CE 2 5G also feature HDR10+ support.

Additionally, all models feature an optical under-display fingerprint sensor.

==== Chipsets ====
The Reno7 and Reno8 are powered by the Qualcomm Snapdragon 680 processor and Adreno 610 GPU.

Reno7 5G, 7 SE, Find X5 Lite, and OnePlus Nord CE 2 5G are powered by the MediaTek Dimensity 900 processor and Mali-G68 MC4 GPU.

The Chinese variant of the Reno7 5G features a Qualcomm Snapdragon 778G processor and Adreno 642L GPU.

Reno7 Pro is powered by the MediaTek Dimensity 1200 Max processor and Mali-G77 MC9 GPU.

==== Memory ====
There are multiple storage configurations depending on the model:

The Oppo Reno7 was sold in 6/128, 8/128, and 8/256 GB configurations.

The Oppo Reno7 5G and Reno7 SE were sold in 8/128 and 8/256 GB configurations.

The Oppo F21 Pro and F21s Pro were sold in the 8/128 GB configuration.

The Oppo Reno8 and Find X5 Lite were sold in the 8/256 GB configuration.

The Chinese variant of the Oppo Reno7 5G was sold in 8/128, 8/256, and 12/256 GB configurations.

The Oppo Reno7 Pro was sold in 8/256 and 12/256 GB configurations.

The OnePlus Nord CE 2 5G was sold in 6/128 and 8/128 GB configurations.

The Chinese variant of the Oppo Reno7 received UFS 2.1 internal storage, the Reno7 Pro received UFS 3.1, while all other models feature UFS 2.2.

==== Battery ====
All models in the series are equipped with a 4500 mAh non-removable battery, containing 2250 mAh dual-cell batteries. The Reno7, Reno8, and 7 SE support 33 W fast charging; the Reno7 5G, 7 Pro, and OnePlus Nord CE 2 5G support 65 W fast charging; and the Chinese Reno7 5G supports 60 W fast charging. All models also support reverse wired charging.

==== Audio ====
The Oppo Reno7 Pro features stereo speakers, using the earpiece as a secondary speaker. All other models lack stereo audio.

=== Camera ===
==== Rear camera ====
Reno7 and Reno8 feature a triple rear camera setup: 64 MP, f/1.7 (wide) with PDAF + 2 MP, f/3.3 (microscope) + 2 MP, f/2.4 (depth sensor). Like the Oppo Find X3, a ring light is included for the microscope lens. Video recording is supported at 1080p@30fps.

Both versions of the Reno7 5G and the OnePlus Nord CE 2 5G feature a triple camera setup: 64 MP, f/1.7 (wide) with PDAF + 8 MP, f/2.2 (ultrawide) with a 119° field of view + 2 MP, f/2.4 (macro), capable of recording video at 4K@30fps.

Reno7 SE features a triple camera setup: 48 MP, f/1.7 (wide) with PDAF + 2 MP, f/2.4 (macro) + 2 MP, f/2.4 (depth sensor), with video recording up to 4K@30fps.

Reno7 Pro features a triple camera setup: 50 MP, f/1.8 (wide) with PDAF + 8 MP, f/2.2 (ultrawide) with a 119° field of view + 2 MP, f/2.4 (macro), with video recording up to 4K@30fps.

==== Front camera ====
Reno7, 7 5G, 7 Pro, and 8 feature a 32 MP, f/2.4 (wide) front camera.

All other models feature a 16 MP, f/2.4 (wide) front camera.

The front camera on all models records video at 1080p@30fps.

=== Software ===
The Oppo Reno7 and Reno8 launched with ColorOS 12.1 based on Android 12, other models in the Reno7 lineup launched with ColorOS 12 based on Android 11, and the OnePlus Nord CE 2 5G launched with OxygenOS 11 based on Android 11. The Oppo Reno7 and Reno8 were updated to ColorOS 14 based on Android 14, other Reno7 models to ColorOS 13.1 based on Android 13, and the OnePlus Nord CE 2 5G to OxygenOS 13 based on Android 13. The software ecosystem was integrated with Always-on display and Edge Lighting.

== Variants ==
=== Oppo Reno7 Pro League of Legends Mobile Game Limited Edition ===
The Oppo Reno7 Pro League of Legends Mobile Game Limited Edition is a special version of the Oppo Reno7 Pro themed around League of Legends: Wild Rift. It was announced on 7 December 2021 with Riot Games, and was exclusive in Chinese markets.

=== Oppo Reno7 New Year Edition ===
On 25 December 2021, Oppo announced the Oppo Reno7 New Year Edition, a special edition of the Chinese Oppo Reno7 5G created for Chinese New Year. This contains a Tiger icon next to the wordmark.

Preceded by Oppo Reno6	Oppo Reno7; 2022	Succeeded by Oppo Reno8
Preceded by Oppo Reno7	Oppo Reno8; 2022	Succeeded by Oppo Reno10
Preceded by Oppo Reno6 5G	Oppo Reno7 5G; 2022	Succeeded by Oppo Reno8 5G
Preceded by Oppo Reno6 5G	Oppo Reno7 5G (China); 2021	Succeeded by Oppo Reno8 5G (China)
Preceded by Oppo Reno6 Pro	Oppo Reno7 Pro; 2021	Succeeded by Oppo Reno8 Pro/Pro (China)
Preceded by Oppo Reno4 SE	Oppo Reno7 SE; 2021	Succeeded by ---
Preceded by Oppo F19 Pro	Oppo F21 Pro; 2022	Succeeded by Oppo F25 Pro
Preceded by Oppo Find X3 Lite	Oppo Find X5 Lite; 2022	Succeeded by ---
Preceded by OnePlus Nord CE 5G	OnePlus Nord CE 2 5G; 2022	Succeeded by OnePlus Nord CE 3 5G
