= Oppo F17 Pro =

Phone developed by Oppo

- Brand: Oppo
- Type: Smartphone
- Series: Oppo F Series
- First released: September 7, 2020
- Predecessor: Oppo F15
- Successor: Oppo F19 Pro
- Related: Oppo F17
- Compatible networks: 2G bands: GSM(850/900/1800/1900); 3G bands: HSDPA(850/900/2100); 4G bands: 1, 3, 5, 8, 38, 40, 41
- Dimensions: 160.1x73.8x7.5 mm; 6.30x2.91x0.30 in
- Weight: 164 g (5.78 oz)
- Operating system: Release: ColorOS 7.2 running on Android 10; Current: ColorOS 11 running on Android 11
- System-on-chip: Mediatek MT6779V Helio P95
- CPU: 2x2.2 GHz Cortex-A75; 6x2.0 GHz Cortex-A55
- GPU: IMG 9XM-HP8 (PowerVR GM9446), 970MHz
- Memory: 8GB Double channel LPDDR4X, 1866MHz
- Storage: 128GB (UFS 2.1)
- Removable storage: microSDXC
- Battery: Non-removable Li-Po, 4015 mAh
- Charging: Fast charging 30W, 50% in 30 min, 100% in 53 min (advertised); VOOC 4.0; Charger output power: 5V/6A
- Rear camera: 1st Camera: Sensor: Samsung GM1ST; Sensor type: ISOCELL; Sensor format: 1/2"; Pixel Size: 0.8um; Aperture: f/1.7; Lenses: 6; Resolution: 8000x6000 (4:3, 48MP); Video: 4K, 30 fps / 1080p, 120/60/30 fps; 2nd Camera: Sensor: SK Hynix Hi-846; Sensor format: 1/4"; Pixel size: 1.12um; Aperture: f/2.2; FOV: 119.9; Lenses: 5 element lens; Resolution: 8MP (ultrawide); 3rd Camera: Sensor: GalaxyCore GC02M1B; Sensor format: 1/5"; Pixel size: 1.75um; Aperture: f/2.4; Lenses: 3 element lens; Resolution: 2MP (monochrome); 4th Camera: Sensor: GalaxyCore GC02M1B; Sensor format: 1/5"; Pixel size: 1.75um; Aperture: f/2.4; Lenses: 3 element lens; Resolution: 2MP (monochrome)
- Front camera: 1st Camera: Sensor: Sony IMX471 Exmor RS; Sensor format: 1/3.1"; Aperture: f/2; Lenses: 5; Resolution: 4624x3468 (4:3, 16.04MP); 2nd Camera: Sensor: GalaxyCore GC02M1B; Sensor format: 1/5"; Pixel size: 1.75um; Aperture: f/2.4; Lenses: 3 element lens; Resolution: 2MP (monochrome)
- Display: Type: Super AMOLED, 430 nits (typ), 800 nits (peak); Size: 6.43 inches, 100.3 cm^2; Resolution: 1080x2400, ~408 ppi; Ratios: 20:9 aspect ratio, 84.9% StB ratio
- Media: Audio: AAC, AAC+ / aacPlus / HE-AAC v1, AMR / AMR-NB / GSM-AMR, AMR-WB, aptX HD / apt-X HD / aptX Lossless, eAAC+ / aacPlus v2 / HE-AAC v2, FLAC, MIDI, MP3, OGG, WMA, WAV, LDAC; Video: 3GPP, AVI, DivX, Flash Video, H.263, H.264 / MPEG-4 Part 10 / AVC video, MKV, MP4, WebM, WMV, Xvid
- Connectivity: Wi-Fi 802.11 a/b/g/n/ac, dual-band, Wi-Fi Direct, hotspot; Bluetooth 5.1, A2DP, LE, aptX HD; A-GPS, GLONASS, GALILEO, BDS, QZSS, BeiDou; FM radio; USB Type-C 2.0, USB On-The-Go
- Data inputs: Optical in-display fingerprint scanner; Accelerometer; Gyro; Proximity; Magnetometer
- SAR: 1.44 W/kg (head), 1.41 W/kg (body)
- Made in: India
- Website: https://www.oppo.com/in/smartphones/series-f/f17-pro/

The Oppo F17 Pro is a phone developed by Oppo. The phone was released in India on September 7, 2020, and later went on the market in other countries by a different name, the Oppo A93. The phone has a single configuration with a price of ₹22990, but there is also a special "Diwali Edition" version of the phone, which features a Matte Gold version of the phone, which is boxed along with a 10000mAh power bank and a "Diwali Exclusive back case cover." This special edition sells for ₹23990.

== Specifications ==
=== Hardware ===
The Oppo F17 Pro is powered by an octa-core processor with a MediaTek Helio P95 (12 nm) chipset and includes 8 GB of RAM and 128 GB of UFS 2.1 storage, which is expandable via a dedicated microSDXC slot. It operates on ColorOS 7.2, a customized version of Android 10. It has a dual front camera setup (16 MP wide and 2 MP depth) and a quad rear camera system, including a 48 MP main camera, an 8 MP ultrawide lens, and two 2 MP depth sensors. The Oppo F17 Pro is equipped with a 4015 mAh battery and supports 30W wired charging (VOOC 4.0), reaching a 100% charge in approximately 53 minutes.
