= Oppo A31 =

2015 Android smartphone

- Brand: Oppo
- Manufacturer: Oppo Electronics
- Type: Smartphone
- Series: Oppo A
- First released: April 2015
- Successor: Oppo A31 (2020)
- Compatible networks: GSM / LTE
- Form factor: Slate
- Colors: Ice White, Sapphire Blue
- Dimensions: 131.9×65.5×8 mm (5.19×2.58×0.31 in)
- Weight: 4.76 oz (135 g)
- Operating system: Android KitKat
- System-on-chip: Qualcomm MSM8916 Snapdragon 410
- CPU: 1.2 GHz Cortex-A53 octa-core
- GPU: Adreno 306
- Memory: 1GB RAM
- Storage: 8GB with eMMC 4.5
- SIM: nanoSIM + microSIM
- Battery: Li-Ion 2000 mAh
- Rear camera: 8MP (f/2.2) with AF and LED flash Video: 1080p@30fps
- Front camera: 5MP
- Display: IPS LCD, 4.5 inches 480 x 854 pixels (16:9) (218 ppi density)
- Data inputs: Accelerometer; Proximity

The Oppo A31 is an entry-level Android smartphone manufactured by Oppo Electronics and released in April 2015 in China. It was the first smartphone part of Oppo's A series lineup.

== Specifications ==
=== Hardware & design ===
The A31 features a dual glass design. The frame is metallic, which comes in Ice White and Sapphire Blue color options.

The A31 is powered by the Qualcomm Snapgragon 410 chipset with quad Cortex-A53 cores and the Adreno 306 GPU. The battery, which is lithium ion, has a capacity of 2000 mAh. The A31 features a 4.5-inch IPS LCD display with resolution of 480 x 854 px (16:9) and a pixel density of 218 ppi. It also comes with an internal memory of 8GB of stoage and 1GB of RAM.

The Oppo A31 features an 8MP main camera with an aperture of f/2.2 and a 5MP front camera. The main camera can be record videos up to 1080p @ 30fps.

=== Software & connectivity ===
The Oppo A31 runs on Android 4.4 KitKat with Oppo's ColorOS 2.0.1 UI. It comes with the following network bands (with both SIM card slots):

- GSM: 800, 850, 1800, and 1900
- LTE: 38, 39, 40, and 41
