= Oppo Pad Neo =

Android-based mid-range tablet from Oppo

Oppo Pad Neo (Oppo Pad Air2 in China)
- Brand: Oppo
- Manufacturer: Oppo
- Type: Tablet computer
- Series: Oppo Pad series
- First released: January 16, 2024; 2 years ago
- Predecessor: Oppo Pad Air
- Color: Space Grey
- Dimensions: 255.1 mm (10.04 in) H 188 mm (7.4 in) W 6.9 mm (0.27 in) D
- Weight: 538 g (19.0 oz)
- Operating system: Original: ColorOS 13.2 (based on Android 13); Current: ColorOS 14 (based on Android 14)
- System-on-chip: Mediatek Helio G99
- CPU: Octa-core (2x2.2 GHz Cortex-A76 & 6x2.0 GHz Cortex-A55)
- GPU: Mali-G57 MC2
- Memory: Wi-Fi Version: 6GB LPDDR4X RAM; LTE Version: 8GB LPDDR4X RAM
- Storage: 128GB
- Removable storage: microSDXC
- SIM: NanoSIM (LTE only)
- Battery: 8000 mAh
- Charging: 33W SuperVOOC Fast Charging
- Rear camera: 8 MP, f/2.0, (wide), 1080p@30fps video
- Front camera: 8 MP, f/2.0, (wide), 1080p@30fps video
- Display: 11.4 in (290 mm) 1720x2408, IPS LCD, 1B colors, 90Hz, 400 nits (260 ppi)
- Sound: Quad speakers, Dolby Atmos, Hi-Res Audio
- Model: Wi-Fi Version: OPD2302; LTE Version: OPD2303
- Website: www.oppo.com/en/accessories/oppo-pad-neo

Oppo Pad Neo is an Android-based tablet produced by Oppo and was released on January 16, 2024. It was equipped with 33W SuperVOOC fast charging and 8000mAh Large battery.

== Specifications ==
=== Hardware ===
==== Chipset ====
The Oppo Pad Neo is powered by 2x2.2 GHz Cortex-A76 & 6x2.0 GHz Cortex-A55 octa-core processors with Mediatek Helio G99. The SoC is based on the 6 nm processing technology node. The tablet also feature an Mali G57 MC2 GPU.

==== Storage ====
The LTE version has a single SIM and comes equipped with 128 GB of ROM and 8 GB of RAM and has additional memory via MicroSD for extra storage. While the WiFi version has a MicroSD for extra storage and comes equipped with 128 GB of ROM and 6 GB of RAM.

==== Camera ====
The Oppo Pad Neo have a 8 MP front camera with an f/2.0 lens. The rear has a 8 MP camera with an f/2.0 wide-angle lens.

==== Display ====
The Oppo Pad Neo is equipped with an IPS LCD display with an 11.4-inch 1720 x 2408 resolution, with a screen ratio of 7:5. The refresh rate can be adjusted from 60 Hz to 90 Hz.

==== Battery ====
The Oppo Pad Neo is equipped with a 8000 mAh battery. This battery is featured with 33W SuperVOOC fast charging capability.

=== Software ===
The Oppo Pad Neo operates on ColorOS 13.2 which is a customized version of Android 13.

== Software ==
The Oppo Pad Neo is equipped with ColorOS 13.2 which based on the Android 13 operating system.
