= Oppo A5s =

2019 Android-based smartphone developed by OPPO

- Brand: Oppo
- Manufacturer: OPPO Electronics
- Type: Smartphone
- Series: Oppo A Series
- First released: March 18, 2019; 7 years ago
- Availability by region: April 22, 2019; 7 years ago
- Predecessor: Oppo A3s
- Successor: Oppo A12
- Related: Oppo A7n; Oppo A7
- Compatible networks: List: 2G bands: GSM 850 / 900 / 1800 / 1900; 3G bands: HSDPA 850 / 900 / 2100; 4G bands (LTE): 1, 3, 5, 7, 8, 20, 28, 38, 40, 41
- Form factor: Slate
- Colors: Blue, Red, Black, Gold, Green
- Dimensions: 155.9 mm (6.14 in) H 75.4 mm (2.97 in) W 8.2 mm (0.32 in) D
- Weight: 170 g (6.0 oz)
- Operating system: Original & Current: Android 8.1 with ColorOS 5.2
- System-on-chip: MediaTek MT6765 Helio P35 (12 nm)
- CPU: Octa-core (4x2.3 GHz Cortex-A53 & 4x1.8 GHz Cortex-A53)
- GPU: PowerVR GE8320
- Memory: 2, 3, 4 GB
- Storage: 32, 64 GB
- SIM: Dual Nano-SIM
- Battery: Li-Ion 4230 mAh
- Charging: 10W
- Rear camera: Primary: 13 MP, f/2.2, 27mm, 1/3.2", 1.12µm, AF; Depth: 2 MP, f/2.4, 1/5.0", 1.75µm; LED flash, HDR, panorama; 1080p@30fps
- Front camera: 8 MP, f/2.0, 24mm (wide), 1/3.4", 1.12µm; HDR; 1080p@30fps
- Display: 6.2 in (160 mm); 720 x 1520 px resolution, 19:9 ratio (~271 ppi density); S-IPS LCD
- Sound: Loudspeaker, 3.5 mm auxiliary (headphone jack)
- Connectivity: Wi-Fi 802.11 b/g/n/, Wi-Fi Direct; Bluetooth 4.2, A2DP, LE
- Data inputs: Multi-touch screen; microUSB 2.0, OTG; Fingerprint scanner (rear-mounted); Accelerometer; Proximity sensor; Compass
- Water resistance: None
- Model: CPH1909, CPH1920, CPH1912

The Oppo A5s is a budget smartphone developed by OPPO Electronics, as part of the OPPO A Series. It is featured with a waterdrop notch design and 4230 mAh long battery life. It was first announced on March 18, 2019 and released on April 22, 2019.

== Specifications ==
=== Design ===
The frame on the phone is made of matte plastic, part of a build that includes a Gorilla Glass 3 front and a plastic back. The display occupies 81.6% of the front. and the waterdrop notch is used for the front camera. The fingerprint scanner is located on the rear of the device. It is positioned in the upper-center area on the back panel of the phone. On the right side. There is a power button. On the left side, there are two volume control buttons and a hybrid slot for two SIM cards and a memory card. At the bottom, there is a micro-USB charging port, a 3.5mm headphone jack, a speaker grille, and the microphone. The main camera is located on the rear panel, housed in the upper-left corner.

The A5s (AX5s) measures itself at 155.9 x 75.4 x 8.2 mm (6.14 x 2.97 x 0.32 in) and weights at 170 g (6.00 oz). The colors are available on Blue, Red, Black, Gold, Green.

=== Hardware ===
The system-on-chip on the A5s (AX5s) uses the MediaTek Helio P35 system-on-chip and uses the GPU PowerVR GE8320. It has an 4230 mAh with 10 W charging.

The A5s has dual-camera setup which includes a main 13MP sensor and a secondary 2MP depth sensor, allowing for portrait shots with a bokeh (background blur) effect.

The display on the A5s uses the S-IPS (Super In-Plane Switching) LCD display with HD+ (1520 x 720) resolution, 6.2", (~271 ppi density). It has a protection (Corning Gorilla Glass 3).

The storage on the A5s uses an eMMC 5.1 storage type, and available in multiple storage. (32 GB/64 GB) and RAM options (2 GB/3 GB/4 GB).

=== Software ===
The A5s uses the operating system Android 8.1 with OPPO's custom skin ColorOS 5.2. while it received updates, newer Android versions might not be officially supported.
