= Oppo Reno5 Z =

2021 smartphone model

Oppo Reno5 Z (Oppo A94 5G) Oppo A95 5G Oppo F19 Pro+
- Manufacturer: OPPO
- Type: Phablet
- Series: Reno/F/A
- First released: F19 Pro+: March 8, 2021; 5 years ago Reno5 Z: April 4, 2021; 5 years ago A94 5G: April 16, 2021; 5 years ago A95 5G: April 23, 2021; 5 years ago
- Predecessor: Oppo Reno4 Z Oppo A93 5G
- Successor: Oppo Reno6 Z Oppo F21 Pro 5G
- Compatible networks: GSM, 3G, 4G (LTE), 5G
- Form factor: Slate
- Dimensions: 160.1×73.4×7.8 mm (6.30×2.89×0.31 in)
- Weight: 173 g (6 oz)
- Operating system: Original: Android 11 + ColorOS 11.1; Current: Android 13 + ColorOS 13.1
- CPU: MediaTek MT6853 Dimensity 800U 5G (7 nm), octa-core (2×2.4 GHz Cortex-A76 & 6×2.0 GHz Cortex-A55)
- GPU: Mali-G57 MC3
- Memory: 8 GB, LPDDR4X
- Storage: Reno5 Z & F19 Pro+ & A94 5G: 128 GB; A95 5G: 128/256 GB; UFS 2.1
- Removable storage: MicroSDXC up to 256 GB
- Battery: Non-removable, Li-Po 4310 mAh
- Charging: Reno5 Z & A94 5G & A95 5G: 30 W fast charging F19 Pro+: 50 W fast charging, 100% in 48 min (advertised); VOOC 4.0
- Rear camera: Reno5 Z & F19 Pro+ & A94 5G: 48 MP Samsung GM1ST, f/1.7, 25 mm (wide), 1/2.0", 0.8μm, PDAF + 8 MP Hynix Hi846, f/2.2, 119°, 16 mm (ultrawide), 1/4.0", 1.12 μm + 2 MP GalaxyCore GC02M1B, f/2.4 (macro) + 2 MP GalaxyCore GC02M1B, f/2.4 (depth sensor); A95 5G: 48 MP Samsung GM1ST, f/1.7, 25 mm (wide), 1/2.0", 0.8 μm, PDAF + 8 MP Hynix Hi846, f/2.2, 119°, 16 mm (ultrawide), 1/4.0", 1.12 μm + 2 MP GalaxyCore GC02M1B, f/2.4 (macro); LED flash, HDR, panorama Video: 4K@30fps, 1080p@30/120fps, gyro-EIS, HDR
- Front camera: 16 MP, f/2.4, 26 mm (wide), 1/3.09", 1.0 μm, PDAF; HDR; Video: 1080p@30fps
- Display: Super AMOLED, 6.43", 2400 × 1080 (FullHD+), 20:9, 409 ppi, 90 Hz
- Connectivity: USB-C 2.0, 3.5 mm Audio, Bluetooth 5.1 (A2DP, LE, aptX HD), NFC (except F19 Pro+), Wi-Fi 802.11 a/b/g/n/ac (dual-band, Wi-Fi Direct, hotspot), GPS, A-GPS, GLONASS, BDS, GALILEO, QZSS
- Data inputs: Fingerprint sensor (under display, optical), proximity sensor, accelerometer, gyroscope, compass

The Oppo Reno5 Z is a smartphone developed by OPPO, part of the Reno series. It was introduced on April 4, 2021. In some countries, the smartphone was presented as the Oppo A94 5G. In India, the Oppo F19 Pro+ was introduced, which is a rebranded Reno5 Z with support for higher charging power. The Oppo A95 5G is also sold in China, which is an identical model to the Oppo A94 5G but without the depth sensor.

== Design ==
The screen is made of Corning Gorilla Glass 5. The body is made of plastic.

The bottom houses the USB-C connector, speaker, microphone, and 3.5 mm audio jack. The top features a second microphone. The left side includes the volume buttons and a slot for 2 SIM cards and a microSD memory card up to 256 GB. The right side has the power button.

The Oppo Reno5 Z is sold in Fluid Black (Black) and Cosmo Blue (Blue).

The Oppo F19 Pro+, A94 5G, and A95 5G are available in Fluid Black (black), Cosmo Blue (blue), and Space Silver (silver).

== Specifications ==
=== Platform ===
The smartphones are powered by the MediaTek Dimensity 800U processor and the Mali-G57 MC3 GPU.

=== Battery ===
The battery has a capacity of 4310 mAh. The F19 Pro+ supports 50 W fast charging, while all other models support 30 W.

=== Cameras ===
The Oppo Reno5 Z, F19 Pro+, and A94 5G feature a quad rear camera setup: 48 MP, f/1.7 (wide) with phase detection autofocus + 8 MP, f/2.2 (ultrawide) with a 119˚ field of view + 2 MP, f/2.4 (macro) + 2 MP, f/2.4 (depth sensor).

The Oppo A95 5G features a triple rear camera setup: 48 MP, f/1.7 (wide) with phase detection autofocus + 8 MP, f/2.2 (ultrawide) with a 119˚ field of view + 2 MP, f/2.4 (macro).

The main camera on all models can record video in 4K@30fps resolution.

All models feature a 16 MP, f/2.4 (wide) front camera with phase detection autofocus and the ability to record video in 1080p@30fps resolution.

=== Display ===
The display is a Super AMOLED panel with a diagonal of 6.43 inches, FullHD+ (2400 × 1080) resolution with a pixel density of 409 ppi, a 20:9 aspect ratio, a 90 Hz refresh rate, and a punch-hole cutout for the front camera located in the top left corner. An under-display optical fingerprint sensor is also integrated.

=== Storage ===
The Oppo Reno5 Z, F19 Pro+, and A94 5G are sold in an 8/128 GB configuration.

The Oppo A95 5G is sold in 8/128 GB and 8/256 GB configurations.

=== Software ===
The smartphones were launched with ColorOS 11.1 based on Android 11. They have been updated to ColorOS 13.1 based on Android 13.
