= Oppo Pad Air =

Android tablet from Oppo

- Manufacturer: Oppo
- Type: Tablet computer
- Series: Oppo Pad series
- First released: June 1, 2022; 4 years ago
- Successor: Oppo Pad Air2
- Colors: Grey, Silver, Purple
- Dimensions: 245.1 mm (9.65 in) H 154.8 mm (6.09 in) W 6.9 mm (0.27 in) D
- Weight: 440 g (16 oz)
- Operating system: ColorOS 12.1 (based on Android 12)
- System-on-chip: Snapdragon 680 4G
- CPU: Octa-core (4x2.4 GHz Kryo 265 Gold & 4x1.9 GHz Kryo 265 Silver)
- GPU: Adreno 610
- Memory: 4 GB, 6GB RAM
- Storage: 64 GB, 128 GB ROM
- Removable storage: microSDXC
- SIM: Not Supported
- Battery: 7100 mAh (Li-Po Battery)
- Charging: 18W wired fast charging, PD
- Rear camera: 8 MP, f/2.0, AF, 1080p@30fps video
- Front camera: 5 MP, f/2.2, 1080p@30fps video
- Display: 10.36 in (263 mm) 1200x2000, IPS LCD, 1B colors, 360 nits (225 ppi)
- Sound: Quad speakers, Dolby Atmos
- Website: www.oppo.com/en/accessories/oppo-pad-air

Oppo Pad Air is an Android-based tablet produced by Oppo and was released on May 23, 2022.

== Specifications ==
=== Hardware ===
==== Chipset ====
The Oppo Pad Air is powered by 4x2.4 GHz Kryo 265 Gold & 4x1.9 GHz Kryo 265 Silver octa-core processors with Snapdragon 680. The SoC is based on the 6 nm processing technology node. The tablet also feature an Adreno 610 GPU.

==== Storage ====
The Oppo Pad Air has a MicroSD for extra storage and is available in 64GB of ROM and 4GB of RAM, 128GB of ROM and 4GB of RAM, and 128GB of ROM and 6GB of RAM.

==== Camera ====
The Oppo Pad Air have a 8 MP rear camera with an f/2.0 lens. The front has a 5 MP, f/2.2 lens.

==== Display ====
The Oppo Pad Air is equipped with an IPS LCD display with an 10.36-inch 1200 x 2000 resolution, with a screen ratio of 5:3.

==== Battery ====
The Oppo Pad Air is equipped with a 7100 mAh Li-Po battery. This battery is featured with 18W fast charging.

=== Software ===
The Oppo Pad Neo operates on ColorOS 12.1 which based on the Android 12 operating system

== Software ==
The Oppo Pad Air is equipped with ColorOS 12.1 which based on the Android 12 operating system.
