= Oppo Reno4 =

Mid-range smartphone

Oppo Reno4 Oppo Reno4 5G Oppo Reno4 Pro Oppo Reno4 Pro 5G
- Manufacturer: OPPO Electronics
- Type: Phablet
- Series: Reno
- First released: Reno4 5G & 4 Pro 5G: June 5, 2020; 6 years ago Reno4: July 29, 2020; 5 years ago Reno4 Pro: July 31, 2020; 5 years ago
- Predecessor: Oppo Reno3
- Successor: Oppo Reno5
- Related: Oppo Reno4 Lite; Oppo Reno4 SE; Oppo Reno4 Z
- Compatible networks: GSM, 3G, 4G (LTE), 5G (5G versions only)
- Form factor: Slate
- Dimensions: Reno4: 160.3 × 73.9 × 7.7 mm Reno4 5G: 159.3 × 74 × 7.8 mm Reno4 Pro: 160.2 × 73.2 × 7.7 mm Reno4 Pro 5G: 159.6 × 72.5 × 7.6 mm
- Weight: Reno4: 165 g Reno4 5G: 161 g Reno4 Pro: 183 g Reno4 Pro 5G: 172 g
- Operating system: Original: Android 10 with ColorOS 7.2; Current: Android 12 with ColorOS 12.1
- CPU: 4G: Qualcomm Snapdragon 720G (8 nm), octa-core (2×2.3 GHz Kryo 465 Gold & 6×1.8 GHz Kryo 465 Silver); 5G: Qualcomm Snapdragon 765G (7 nm), octa-core (1×2.4 GHz Kryo 475 Prime & 1×2.2 GHz Kryo 475 Gold & 6×1.8 GHz Kryo 475 Silver)
- GPU: 4G: Adreno 618; 5G: Adreno 620
- Memory: Reno4 & 4 5G & 4 Pro: 8 GB; Reno4 Pro 5G: 8/12 GB; LPDDR4X
- Storage: Reno4: 128 GB; Reno4 5G & 4 Pro & 4 Pro 5G: 128/256 GB; UFS 2.1
- Removable storage: 4G: MicroSDXC up to 256 GB; 5G: None
- Battery: All models: Non-removable Li-Po; Reno4: 4015 mAh; Reno4 5G & 4 Pro & 4 Pro 5G: 4000 mAh
- Charging: Reno4: 30W fast charging, 50% in 20 min (advertised); VOOC 4.0; Reno4 5G & 4 Pro & 4 Pro 5G: 65W fast charging, 60% in 15 min, 100% in 36 min (advertised); SuperVOOC 2.0
- Rear camera: Reno4 & 4 Pro: 48 MP Sony IMX586, f/1.7, 26 mm (wide), 1/2.0", 0.8 µm, PDAF + 8 MP, f/2.2, 119˚ (ultrawide), 1/4.0", 1.12 µm + 2 MP, f/2.4 (macro) + 2 MP, f/2.4 (depth); Reno4 5G: 48 MP Sony IMX586, f/1.7, 26 mm (wide), 1/2.0", 0.8 µm, PDAF + 8 MP, f/2.2, 119˚ (ultrawide), 1/4.0", 1.12 µm + 2 MP, f/2.4 (depth); Reno4 Pro 5G: 48 MP Sony IMX586, f/1.7, 26 mm (wide), 1/2.0", 0.8 µm, PDAF, Laser AF, OIS + 13 MP, f/2.4, 52 mm (telephoto), 1/3.4", 1.0 µm, 2x optical zoom, PDAF + 12 MP, f/2.2, 120˚ (ultrawide), 1/2.43", 1.4 µm, AF; LED flash, HDR, panorama Video: 4K@30fps, 1080p@30/60/120fps (except Reno4), gyro-EIS, OIS (Reno4 Pro 5G), HDR (5G versions)
- Front camera: Reno4 & 4 Pro & 4 Pro 5G: 32 MP, f/2.4, 26 mm (wide), 1/2.8", 0.8 µm Reno4 5G: 32 MP, f/2.4, 26 mm (wide), 1/2.8", 0.8 µm + 2 MP, f/2.4 (depth); HDR; Video: 1080p@30/120fps (Reno4 Pro), gyro-EIS (except Reno4)
- Display: Reno4: OLED, 6.4", 2400 × 1080 pixels (1080p), 20:9 ratio, 411 ppi Reno4 5G: AMOLED, 6.43", 2400 × 1080 pixels (1080p), 20:9 ratio, 409 ppi Reno4 Pro: Super AMOLED, 6.5", 2400 × 1080 pixels (1080p), 20:9 ratio, 402 ppi, 90 Hz, HDR10; Reno4 Pro 5G: AMOLED, 6.55", 2400 × 1080 pixels (1080p), 20:9 ratio, 402 ppi, 90 Hz, HDR10+
- Connectivity: USB-C 2.0 (4G versions) / 3.1 (5G versions), 3.5 mm audio jack (4G versions), Bluetooth 5.1 (A2DP, LE, aptX HD), NFC (except Reno4), Wi-Fi 802.11 a/b/g/n/ac/6 (5G versions) (dual-band, Wi-Fi Direct, hotspot), GPS, A-GPS (Reno4) / dual-band A-GPS, GLONASS, BeiDou, Galileo, QZSS, GNSS (Reno4 Pro)
- Other: Fingerprint reader (under-display, optical), proximity sensor, accelerometer, gyroscope, compass

The Oppo Reno4 is a line of smartphones developed by OPPO as part of their Reno series. The lineup consists of the Oppo Reno4, Reno4 5G, Reno4 Pro, and Reno4 Pro 5G, serving as the successor to the Oppo Reno3 line. The Oppo Reno4 5G and Reno4 Pro 5G were officially introduced on June 5, 2020. The standard Oppo Reno4 was launched on July 29, 2020, followed by the Reno4 Pro variant on July 31 of the same year. All models feature fast charging technology; the Reno4 5G, Reno4 Pro, and Reno4 Pro 5G are equipped with a 65W configuration capable of refueling the 4000 mAh battery to 60% in 15 minutes and 100% in 36 minutes.

The Oppo Reno4 Pro was released in India on August 5 in authorized stored, Amazon and Flipkart, then on October 16 for the United Kingdom alongside Reno 4 and Reno 4 Z.

== Design ==
The front displays are protected by Corning Gorilla Glass 5. For the Reno4 and Reno4 Pro, the chassis build uses plastic materials. The Reno4 5G upgrades its rear plate to Gorilla Glass 3, while the Reno4 Pro 5G implements Gorilla Glass 5 on the back. The midframe elements of both 5G variations are constructed from aluminum.

Looking at physical connectivity on the bottom rim, the 4G iterations include a USB-C port, loudspeaker grille, primary microphone, and a 3.5 mm headphone jack. The 5G iterations replace the audio jack layout on the bottom with a dual-SIM card slot alongside the USB-C interface, loudspeaker, and microphone. A secondary noise-canceling microphone sits on the top edge across all devices. On the 4G versions, the top edge also houses a hybrid expansion tray accommodating either two SIM cards or one SIM combined with a microSD storage card up to 256 GB. Physical volume rockers sit on the left edge, balanced by the power button located on the right.

Color options vary across multiple models:

- Oppo Reno4: Galactic Blue and Space Black.
- Oppo Reno4 Pro: Galactic Blue and Starry Night.
- Oppo Reno4 5G: Galactic Blue, Space Black, and Purple.
- Oppo Reno4 Pro 5G: Galactic Blue, Space Black, White, Pink, and Green.

== Specifications ==
=== Hardware and performance ===
The 4G entries run on a Qualcomm Snapdragon 720G system-on-chip coupled with an Adreno 618 graphics processing processor.

The 5G variations shift configurations to a Qualcomm Snapdragon 765G chip platform integrated with an Adreno 620 GPU engine.

=== Battery ===
The baseline Oppo Reno4 carries a 4015 mAh battery with 30W VOOC 4.0 fast charging support. All surrounding versions scale down slightly to a 4000 mAh battery capacity while introducing faster 65W SuperVOOC 2.0 charging technology.

=== Cameras ===
==== Main camera ====
The Reno4 and Reno4 Pro models share an identical quad-camera array - a 48 MP primary wide module with phase-detection autofocus (PDAF) at f/1.7, an 8 MP ultrawide lens at f/2.2, a 2 MP macro sensor at f/2.4, and a 2 MP depth sensor at f/2.4.

The Reno4 5G transitions down to a triple camera structure by removing the dedicated macro node, preserving the 48 MP primary (f/1.7 with PDAF), 8 MP ultrawide (f/2.2), and 2 MP depth sensor (f/2.4).

The Reno4 Pro 5G builds a higher-tier triple camera setup containing a 48 MP main camera (f/1.7) enhanced with Laser AF and optical image stabilization (OIS), a 13 MP telephoto lens (f/2.4) unlocking 2x optical zoom with PDAF, and a wide-spectrum 12 MP ultrawide hardware component (f/2.2) supporting standalone autofocus.

All devices support native video capture modes reaching up to 4K at 30fps. The main camera was integrated with AI Color Portrait, Night Flare Portrait Mode, Ultra Dark Mode, and 960FPS AI Slow-motion AI Color Portrait Video for enhancement.

==== Front camera ====
The Reno4 5G brings a dual selfie cluster setup forward, containing a 32 MP wide lens at f/2.4 working alongside a 2 MP secondary depth tracking sensor at f/2.4. All companion models in the line carry a singular 32 MP wide module at f/2.4. Front video capture tops out at 1080p at 30fps across the range.

=== Displays ===
- Reno4: 6.4-inch OLED display at FullHD+ (2400 × 1080 resolution), 411 ppi pixel density, 20:9 ratio, utilizing a singular circular punch-hole cutout for the selfie camera in the top-left corner.
- Reno4 5G: 6.43-inch AMOLED panel at FullHD+ (2400 × 1080 resolution), 409 ppi pixel density, 20:9 ratio, carrying an oblong pill-shaped display cut out to handle its dual lens front hardware.
- Reno4 Pro: 6.5-inch Super AMOLED screen with FullHD+ resolution, 402 ppi pixel density, 20:9 shape profile, featuring a 90 Hz fluid refresh cycle option and HDR10 playback certification.
- Reno4 Pro 5G: 6.55-inch AMOLED screen hitting FullHD+ metrics, 402 ppi density, 20:9 screen ratio, offering a 90 Hz high refresh profile and HDR10+ media support.

Every model in the family implements an optical under-display fingerprint reader solution.

=== Audio ===
The premium Oppo Reno4 Pro 5G stands out as the only model offering a dual stereo loudspeaker system, which routes channel audio through the baseline frame speaker and ear speaker piece. The remaining line entries rely entirely on single channel mono outputs.

=== Storage and memory configurations ===
- Oppo Reno4 was exclusively sold in an 8 GB RAM / 128 GB storage structure.
- Oppo Reno4 Pro & Reno4 5G was available in 8 GB / 128 GB and 8 GB / 256 GB options.
- Oppo Reno4 Pro 5G was configured in 8 GB / 128 GB or a top-tier 12 GB / 256 GB format tier.

=== Software ===
The smartphone family originally launched running ColorOS 7.2 custom software layers built over Android 10. They have since been updated to ColorOS 12.1 operating environments driven by Android 12.

== Special editions ==
=== Artist Limited Edition ===
Oppo released a limited edition for the Reno 4 Pro entitled as the "Artist Limited Edition", associating Taiwanese-American visual artist James Jean.

=== MS Dhoni Edition ===
Another special edition with the same model entitled as the "MS Dhoni", released on September 24, 2020. It was only available in Galactic Blue variant. It also includes a signature at the back and below the camera module.
