= Oppo A31 (2020) =

2020 Android smartphone manufactured by Oppo

Oppo A31 (2020) (Oppo A8 in China)
- Brand: OPPO
- Type: Phablet
- Series: Oppo A
- First released: A8: December 20, 2019; 6 years ago A31: February 13, 2020; 6 years ago
- Predecessor: Oppo A31
- Related: Oppo A91
- Compatible networks: List: Technology: A31: GSM / HSPA / LTE; A8: GSM / CDMA / HSPA / EVDO / LTE; 2G bands: All: GSM 850 / 900 / 1800 / 1900; 3G bands: A31: HSDPA 850 / 900 / 2100 - International; A8: HSDPA 850 / 900 / 2100; 4G bands (LTE): A31: 1, 3, 5, 7, 8, 20, 28, 38, 40, 41 - International; A8: 1, 3, 5, 8, 34, 38, 39, 40, 41; Speed: All: HSPA, LTE
- Form factor: Slate
- Colors: A31 (2020): Fantasy White, Mystery Black, Lake Green; A8 (China): Green, Black
- Dimensions: 163.9×75.5×8.3 mm (6.45×2.97×0.33 in)
- Weight: 180 g (6 oz)
- Operating system: Android 9 Pie + ColorOS 6.1.2
- CPU: MediaTek MT6765V/CB Helio P35 (12 nm), Octa-core (4x2.3 GHz Cortex-A53 & 4x1.8 GHz Cortex-A53)
- GPU: PowerVR GE8320
- Memory: A31: 4/6 GB; A8: 4 GB; LPDDR4X
- Storage: A31: 64/128 GB; A8: 128 GB eMMC 5.1
- Removable storage: microSDXC up to 256 GB
- Battery: Non-removable, Li-Po 4230 mAh
- Charging: 10W; microUSB 2.0
- Rear camera: Sony IMX 386; 12 MP, f/1.8, 28 mm (wide), 1/2.86", 1.25 μm, PDAF; OmniVision OV02A1B; 2 MP, f/2.4, (macro); GalaxyCore GC2375; 2 MP, f/2.4, (depth); LED flash, HDR, panorama Video: 1080p@30fps
- Front camera: Hynix Hi-846; 8 MP, f/2.0 (wide), 1/4.0", 1.12 μm HDR; Video: 1080p@30fps
- Display: IPS LCD, 6.5", 1600 × 720 (HD+), 20:9, 270 ppi
- Connectivity: Micro-USB 2.0, 3.5 mm Audio, Bluetooth 5.0 (A2DP, LE), FM radio, Wi-Fi 802.11 a/b/g/n/ac (dual-band, Wi-Fi Direct, hotspot), GPS, A-GPS, GLONASS, BDS
- Other: Fingerprint sensor (rear-mounted), proximity sensor, accelerometer, gyroscope, compass

The Oppo A31 (2020) is a budget smartphone that was manufactured by Oppo Electronics, announced on February 13, 2020. In China, the Oppo A8 was released in December 2019, along with the Oppo A91.

The A31 (2020) was available at CPH2015, CPH2073, CPH2081, CPH2029, and CPH2031 variants, while the A8 was only available at PDBM00 variant.

== Availability ==
The A31 (2020) was launched on February 14, 2020. It also went available as a "silent release" on March 10, 2020, in the Philippines.

== Specifications ==
=== Design & Hardware ===
The back and frame are made of plastic, with multiple color options differ from the following model:

- A31 (2020) - Fantasy White, Mystery Black, Lake Green
- A8 (China) - Green, Black

In the front's exterior, it was protected with Gorilla Glass 3, which comes with an IPS LCD display sizing at 6.5 inches, with resolution of 720 x 1600 pixels (20:9).

Both smartphones were powered by an octa-core MediaTek Helio P35 processor and a PowerVR GE8320 graphics processor. The li-po battery has a capacity of 4230 mAh. The A31 (2020) is sold in 4/64, 4/128 and 6/128 GB configurations, while the A8 (China) was sold in a 4/128 GB configuration. It was expandable up to 256GB with the microSD card. Both smartphones feature a triple main camera of 12MP (f/1.8) main (wide-angle) with PDAF, 2MP (f/2.4) macro and 2MP (f/2.4) depth sensor and an 8MP (f/2.2) front camera. Both the main and front can record videos up to 1080p @ 30fps.

=== Software ===
Both smartphones run on Oppo's ColorOS 6.1.2, which is based on Android 9 Pie.
