= Oppo A72 =

2020 smartphone developed and manuafactured by OPPO

Oppo A72 / A92
- Manufacturer: OPPO Electronics
- Type: Phablet
- Series: A
- First released: A72: April 21, 2020; 6 years ago A92: May 4, 2020; 6 years ago
- Availability by region: A72: April 29, 2020; A92: Malaysia: May 9, 2020; Philippines: June 27, 2020
- Predecessor: Oppo A91
- Successor: Oppo A73 (2020); Oppo A93
- Related: Oppo A52; Oppo A72 5G; Oppo A92s
- Compatible networks: GSM, 3G, 4G (LTE)
- Form factor: Slate
- Colors: A72: Twilight Black, Stream White, Sky Blue, Aurora Purple; A92: Twilight Black, Stream White, Aurora Purple
- Dimensions: 162×75.5×8.9 mm (6.38×2.97×0.35 in)
- Weight: 192 g (7 oz)
- Operating system: Original: Android 10 + ColorOS 7.1; Current: Android 11 + ColorOS 11.1
- System-on-chip: Qualcomm SM6115 Snapdragon 662 (11 nm)
- CPU: Octa-core (4×2.0 GHz Kryo 260 Gold & 4×1.8 GHz Kryo 260 Silver)
- GPU: Adreno 610
- Memory: A72: 4/6 GB; A92: 6/8 GB; LPDDR4X
- Storage: 128 GB UFS 2.1
- Removable storage: microSDXC up to 256 GB
- SIM: Dual SIM (Nano-SIM)
- Battery: Non-removable, Li-Po 5000 mAh
- Charging: 18 W fast charging Quick Charge 3.0
- Rear camera: 48 MP, f/1.7 (wide-angle), 1/2", 0.8 μm, PDAF + 8 MP, f/2.2, 119˚ (ultrawide), 1/4", 1.12 μm + 2 MP, f/2.4 (depth) + 2 MP, f/2.4 (B/W); LED flash, HDR, panorama Video: 4K@30fps, 1080p@30/120fps, gyro-EIS
- Front camera: 16 MP, f/2.0, 26 mm (wide-angle), 1/3.06", 1 μm HDR; Video: 1080p@30fps
- Display: IPS LCD, 6.5", 2400 × 1080 (FullHD+), 20:9, 405 ppi
- Connectivity: USB-C 2.0, 3.5 mm jack, Bluetooth 5.0 (A2DP, LE), NFC (A72), FM radio (A92), Wi-Fi 802.11 a/b/g/n/ac (dual-band, Wi-Fi Direct, hotspot), GPS, A-GPS, GLONASS, Galileo, BeiDou
- SAR: A72: Head 0.48 W/kg; Body 0.92 W/kg
- Other: Fingerprint sensor (side-mounted), proximity sensor, accelerometer, compass, pedometer

The Oppo A72 is a mid-range Android smartphone part of A series, developed and manufactured by OPPO. It was announced on April 21, 2020. On May 4, 2020, the Oppo A92, which is rebranded in Malaysia, was introduced, followed by the Philippines on June 27, 2020.

== Specifications ==
=== Hardware ===
Both smartphones are powered by the Octa-core CPU, layered with four Kryo 260 Golds and Kryo 260 Silvers, clocking respectively at 2.0GHz and 1.8GHz, the Adreno 610 GPU and the Qualcomm SM6125 Snapdragon 665 chipset. The battery capacity is 5000 mAh, featuring an 18W-wired fast charging with Quick Charge 3.0. The internal memory is only available at 128GB with 4GB, 6GB, or 8GB RAM options. The 6GB is only available for the A92.

The main camera features an AI-Quad Camera, with 4 camera modules with autofocus:

Main Camera (A72/A92)
resolution (in MP (megapixels))	type	aperture
48MP (auxiliary)	wide-angle	f/1.7
8MP (auxiliary)	ultra-wide angle (119 degrees)	f/2.2
2MP	in-depth	f/2.4
2MP	black and white	f/2.4

Video can be recorded up to 4K @ 30fps or standard 1080p @ 30-120fps. The front camera features a 16MP module (aperture f/2.0), sizing at1/3.06 inches, and can record up to 1080p @ 30fps. The display in the front is protected by Corning Gorilla Glass 3, installed with an IPS LCD type sizing at 6.5 inches, with a resolution of 1080 x 2400 pixels (20:9 ratio) and 405 ppi desnsity.

=== Software ===
The A72 and A92 runs on ColorOS 7.1, which is based on Android 10 and was updated to ColorOS 11 (Android 11).

== Critics ==
- UnboxPH notices limitation to HD resolution for ultra-wide-angle.
- Tech Advisor noticed performance lags.
- TechRadar noticed that in games like Asphalt 9, it fairly runs with low frame rate.
