= Oppo Find N2 =

2022 foldable Android based smartphone

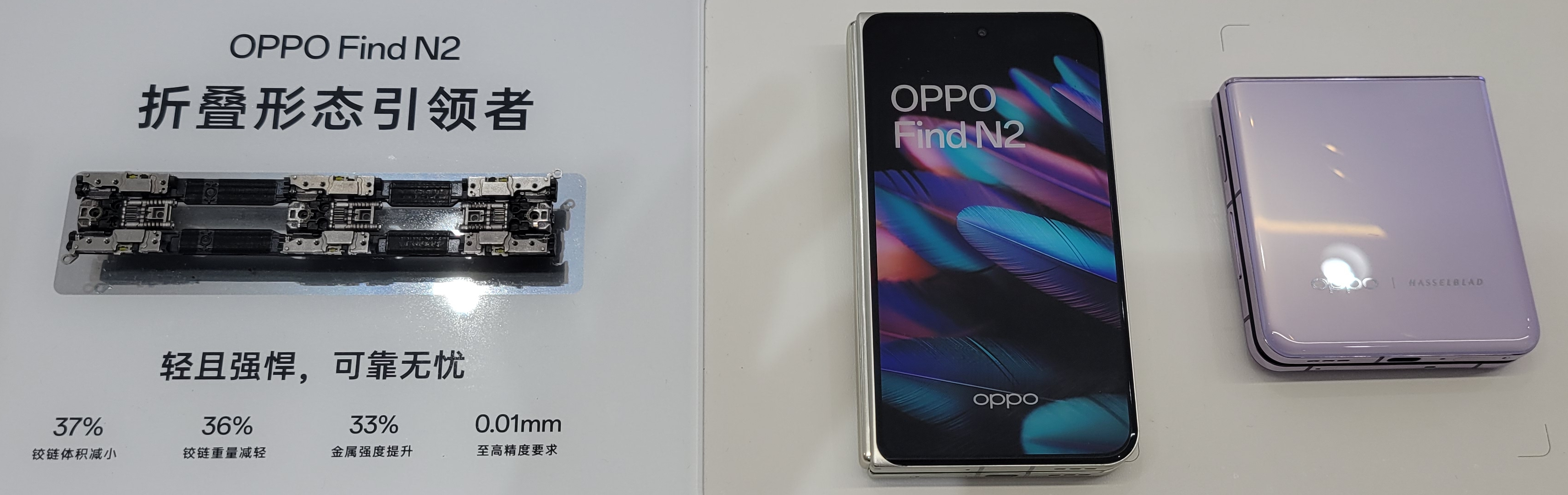
- Oppo Find N2 unfolded
- Brand: Oppo Find series
- Manufacturer: Oppo
- Type: Foldable smartphone
- Series: Oppo Find N series
- First released: December 2022
- Predecessor: Oppo Find N
- Successor: Oppo Find N3
- Related: Oppo Find N2 Flip
- Form factor: Foldable (vertical hinge)
- Colors: Black, White, Green
- Dimensions: 132.2 × 140.5 × 7.4 mm (unfolded); 132.2 × 72.6 × 14.6 mm (folded)
- Weight: 233 g (8 oz)
- Operating system: Android 13 with ColorOS 13
- System-on-chip: Qualcomm Snapdragon 8+ Gen 1 (4 nm)
- CPU: Octa-core (1×3.0 GHz Cortex-X2 & 3×2.75 GHz Cortex-A710 & 4×2.0 GHz Cortex-A510)
- GPU: Adreno 730
- Memory: 12 GB or 16 GB LPDDR5
- Storage: 256 GB or 512 GB UFS 3.1
- Removable storage: None
- SIM: Dual nano-SIM
- Battery: Li-Po 4520 mAh, non-removable
- Charging: 67 W wired, 10 W reverse wired
- Rear camera: 50 MP (wide, OIS) 32 MP (telephoto) 48 MP (ultrawide)
- Front camera: 32 MP front camera 1080p@30fps 4K video supported
- Display: 7.1 in Foldable LTPO AMOLED, 120Hz, HDR10+, ~1200 nits peak
- External display: 5.54 in AMOLED, 1080 × 2120 px, 120Hz
- Sound: Stereo speakers
- Connectivity: 5G, Wi-Fi 6, Bluetooth 5.3, NFC, USB-C, GPS, OTG
- Water resistance: Not specified
- Development status: Released

The Oppo Find N2 is a foldable smartphone developed by Oppo, officially announced on December 15, 2022 at INNO Day 2022. It is Oppo's second foldable smartphone, and a successor to Oppo Find N.

== Design ==
With dimensions of 132.2 × 140.5 × 7.4 mm (unfolded) and 132.2 × 72.6 × 14.6 mm (folded) respectively, the height is slightly taller than the iPhone 13 mini.
