= Oppo A72 5G =

2020 OPPO smartphone

- Also known as: Oppo A73 5G
- Developer: OPPO
- Manufacturer: OPPO
- Type: Smartphone
- Series: A
- First released: July 31, 2020; 6 years ago
- Predecessor: Oppo A72
- Successor: Oppo A74 5G 5G
- Related: Oppo A72; Oppo A73 (2020)
- Compatible networks: 2G GSM & CDMA; 3G HSDPA & EVDO; 4G LTE; 5G
- Form factor: Slate
- Colors: Black, Purple, Neon
- Dimensions: 162.2×75×7.9 mm (6.39×2.95×0.31 in)
- Weight: 6.17 oz (175 g)
- Operating system: Android 10 with ColorOS 7.2
- System-on-chip: Mediatek Dimensity 720 (7 nm)
- CPU: Octa-core; 2x 2.0 GHz Cortex-A76 7 6x 2.0 GHz Cortex-A55
- GPU: Mali-G57 MC3
- Memory: 4GB, 6GB, or 8GB
- Storage: 128GB (UFS 2.1)
- SIM: 2x nanoSIM
- Battery: Li-po 4040 mAh
- Charging: USB Type-C 2.0 charging, up to 18W
- Rear camera: Triple, 16MP wide-angle with PDAF (f/2.2) + 8MP ultra-wide-angle (119°); lens size 1/4.0" (1.12μm) (f/2.2) + 2MP in-depth sensor f/2.4 Video: 4K@30fps and 1080p@30/120fps (gyro-EIS)
- Front camera: 8MP wide-angle f/2.0 Video: 1080p@30fps (gyro-EIS)
- Display: 6.5" IPS LCD, 90Hz, average screen brightness @ 480 nits Resolution: 1080 × 2400 px (20:9 ratio) with 405 ppi density

The Oppo A72 5G (also known as the Oppo A73 5G) is a mid-range Android smartphone developed and manufactured by Oppo. It was announced on July 27, 2020 and initially released on July 31, 2020 in China as a predecessor of the Oppo A72. It was succeeded by the Oppo A74. As a predecessor of the 4G variant utilizing the Snapdragon 665, it uses a MediaTek processor.

== Specifications ==
=== Hardware ===
The A72 5G is powered by the Mediatek Dimensity 720 chipset with an octa-core central processor layered with two 2.0 GHz Cortex-A76s and six 2.0 GHz Cortex-A55s and the Mali-G57 MC3 GPU. The battery capacity is 4040 mAh with 18W fast charging support. The A72 5G has 128GB of internal storage with 4GB, 6GB, or 8GB of RAM configurations, but in China, it only has one configuration starting at 8GB.

The display features a 6.5-inch IPS LCD with Full HD+ panel and a resolution of 1080 × 2400 pixels (20:9), with a circular punch-hole notch displayed on the left.

=== Camera ===
Main camera
Resolution (in MP)	Type	Aperture
16MP	Wide-angle	f/2.2
8MP	Ultra-wide (119°)	f/2.2
2MP	In-depth sensor	f/2.4

The main camera can record up to 4K at 30fps or 1080p at 30/120fps.

Front camera
Resolution (in MP)	Type	Aperture
8MP (with HDR)	Wide-angle	f/2.0

The front camera can only record up to 1080p at 30/120fps.
