= Oppo Reno4 Lite =

Mid-range smartphone manufactured by Oppo

Oppo Reno4 Lite (Oppo F17 Pro in India) Oppo Reno4 F (Oppo A93)
- Manufacturer: OPPO Electronics
- Type: Phablet
- Series: Reno / A / F
- First released: F17 Pro: September 2, 2020; 5 years ago Reno4 Lite: September 28, 2020; 5 years ago A93: October 1, 2020; 5 years ago Reno4 F: October 10, 2020; 5 years ago
- Predecessor: Oppo A92; Oppo Reno2 F
- Successor: Oppo Reno5 Lite
- Compatible networks: GSM, 3G, 4G (LTE)
- Form factor: Slate
- Dimensions: Reno4 Lite & F17 Pro: 160.1 mm (6.30 in) H 73.7 mm (2.90 in) W 7.4 mm (0.29 in) D Reno4 F & A93: 160.1 mm (6.30 in) H 73.8 mm (2.91 in) W 7.5 mm (0.30 in) D
- Weight: 164 g (5.8 oz)
- Operating system: Initial: Android 10 + ColorOS 7.2; Current: Android 12 + ColorOS 12
- System-on-chip: MediaTek MT6779V Helio P95 (12 nm)
- CPU: Octa-core (2x2.2 GHz Cortex-A75 & 6x2.0 GHz Cortex-A55)
- GPU: PowerVR GM9446
- Memory: 8 GB LPDDR4X
- Storage: 128 GB UFS 2.1
- Removable storage: microSDXC up to 256 GB
- Battery: All models: Non-removable, Li-Po; Reno4 Lite & F17 Pro: 4015 mAh; Reno4 F & A93: 4000 mAh
- Charging: Reno4 Lite & F17 Pro: 30W fast charging, 50% in 30 min, 100% in 53 min (advertised), VOOC 4.0; Reno4 F & A93: 18W fast charging
- Rear camera: 48 MP Samsung GM1ST, f/1.7, 26 mm (wide), 1/2.0", 0.8 µm, PDAF + 8 MP Hynix Hi846, f/2.2, 119˚, 16 mm (ultrawide), 1/4.0", 1.12 µm + 2 MP GalaxyCore GC02M1B, f/2.4 (macro) + 2 MP GalaxyCore GC02M1B, f/2.4 (depth); LED flash, HDR, panorama Video: 4K@30fps, 1080p@30/120fps, gyro-EIS
- Front camera: 16 MP, f/2.4 (wide), 1/3.09", 1.0 µm + 2 MP, f/2.4 (depth); HDR; Video: 1080p@30fps
- Display: Reno4 Lite: AMOLED; F17 Pro & Reno4 F: Super AMOLED; All models: 6.43", 2400 × 1080 (FullHD+), 20:9 ratio, 409 ppi

The Oppo Reno4 Lite is a smartphone developed by OPPO Electronics, part of the Reno series and a simplified version of the Oppo Reno4. It was unveiled on September 28, 2020. In India, the smartphone was introduced on September 2, 2020, under the name Oppo F17 Pro. On October 1, 2020, the Oppo A93 was unveiled, a similar model to the Oppo Reno4 Lite except for the battery capacity and charging speed. On October 10, 2020, the Oppo A93 was introduced in Indonesia under the name Oppo Reno4 F.

== Design ==
The screen is made of Corning Gorilla Glass 3. The body is made of plastic.

On the bottom, there is a USB-C port, speaker, microphone, and a 3.5 mm audio jack. On the top, there is a second microphone. On the left side are the volume buttons and a slot for two SIM cards and a MicroSD memory card up to 256 GB. On the right side is the power button.

The Oppo F17 Pro was sold in 4 colors: Magic Blue, Matte Black, Metallic White, and Matte Gold.

The Oppo Reno4 F and A93 were sold in Matte Black and Metallic White.

== Specifications ==
=== Hardware ===
==== Platform ====
The smartphones are powered by a MediaTek Helio P95 processor and a PowerVR GM9446 GPU.

==== Battery ====
The Oppo Reno4 Lite and F17 Pro feature a 4015 mAh battery with support for 30W VOOC 4.0 fast charging.

The Oppo Reno4 F and A93 feature a 4000 mAh battery with support for 18W fast charging.

==== Camera ====
The smartphones feature a quad main camera setup: 48 MP, f/1.7 (wide) + 8 MP, f/2.2 (ultrawide) with a 119˚ field of view + 2 MP, f/2.4 (macro) + 2 MP, f/2.4 (depth) with phase detection autofocus and 4K video recording capabilities at 30fps. Additionally, the smartphones feature a dual front-facing camera: 16 MP, f/2.4 (wide) + 2 MP, f/2.4 (depth) capable of recording 1080p video at 30fps.

==== Display ====
The Reno4 Lite features an AMOLED display, while the other models feature a Super AMOLED display; a 6.43" diagonal screen, FullHD+ resolution (2400 × 1080) with a pixel density of 409 ppi, a 20:9 aspect ratio, and an oval pill-shaped cutout for the dual front camera located in the upper-left corner.

All models feature an under-display optical fingerprint scanner.

==== Memory ====
The smartphones were sold in an 8/128 GB configuration.

=== Software ===
The smartphones were launched with ColorOS 7.2 based on Android 10. They were updated to ColorOS 12 based on Android 12.

== Special variants ==
=== Oppo F17 Pro Diwali Edition ===
The Oppo F17 Pro Diwali Edition is a special version of the Oppo F17 Pro dedicated to the Indian festival of Diwali. Features of this version include a new Matte Gold color, matching system wallpapers, a stylized case included in the box, and a free 10000 mAh power bank supporting 18W fast charging. Pre-orders on Amazon.in began on October 19, with sales starting on October 23, 2020.
