= ColorOS =

Android-based mobile operating system by Oppo

- Logo used since 2020

- ColorOS 16 home screen
- Developer: Oppo
- OS family: Android
- Working state: Current
- Initial release: September 23, 2013; 13 years ago
- Latest release: 17.0.1 / 4 November 2026; 12 days ago
- Latest preview: 17 / 17 September 2026; 60 days ago
- Available in: 67 languages
- List of languages: Global: English and others; Català – Catalan; Čeština – Czech; Dansk – Danish; Deutsch (Deutschland) – German (Germany); Deutsch (Schweiz) – German (Switzerland); English (Australia) – English (Australia); English (Ireland) – English (Ireland); English (New Zealand) – English (New Zealand); English (United Kingdom) – English (United Kingdom); English (United States) – English (United States); Español (España) – Spanish (Spain); Español (México) – Spanish (Mexico); Euskara – Basque; Filipino – Filipino; Français – French; Galego – Galician; Hrvatski – Croatian; Indonesia – Indonesian; Italiano – Italian; Kiswahili - Swahili; Magyar – Hungarian; Melayu – Malay; Nederlands – Dutch; Norsk bokmål – Norwegian Bokmål; O‘zbek – Uzbek (Latin); Polski (Polska) – Polish (Poland); Português (Brasil) – Portuguese (Brazil); Português (Portugal) – Portuguese (Portugal); Română – Romanian; Slovenčina – Slovak; Slovenščina – Slovenian; Suomi – Finnish; Svenska – Swedish; Tiếng Việt – Vietnamese; Türkçe – Turkish; Ελληνικά – Greek; Български – Bulgarian; Қазақ тілі – Kazakh; Русский – Russian; Українська – Ukrainian; עברית – Hebrew; اردو – Urdu; العربية – Arabic; नेपाली – Nepali; मराठी – Marathi; हिन्दी – Hindi; অসমীয়া – Assamese; বাংলা (বাংলাদেশ) – Bangla; ਪੰਜਾਬੀ – Punjabi; ગુજરાતી – Gujarati; ଓଡ଼ିଆ – Odia; தமிழ் – Tamil; తెలుగు – Telugu; ಕನ್ನಡ – Kannada; മലയാളം – Malayalam; සිංහල – Sinhala; ไทย – Thai; བོད་སྐད་ – Tibetan; ລາວ – Lao; မြန်မာ (Unicode) – Burmese (Unicode); ဗမာ (Zawgyi) – Burmese (Zawgyi); ខ្មែរ – Khmer; 한국어 – Korean; 日本語 – Japanese; 简体中文 – Simplified Chinese; 繁體中文 – Traditional Chinese; 繁體中文 (香港) – Traditional Chinese (Hong Kong)
- License: Proprietary
- Official website: ColorOS 17

ColorOS is a user interface created by Oppo based on Android. Initially, Realme phones used ColorOS until it was replaced by Realme UI in 2020. Realme UI uses some of ColorOS's apps. Starting from the OnePlus 9 series, OnePlus will preinstall ColorOS on all smartphones that are sold in mainland China instead of HydrogenOS (Chinese version of OxygenOS).

In September 2026, Oppo announced that ColorOS has 770 million active users worldwide, spanning more than 90 countries and regions.

== History ==
The first version of ColorOS was launched in September 2013. Oppo had released plenty of Android smartphones before then. It was not stock Android, but Oppo did not label it as ColorOS. Over the years, Oppo launched new official versions of the operating system. Major version 4 was skipped due to the superstitious nature of the number. To make things less confusing, in 2020 the company revealed that it would adopt the same numbering scheme as mainline Android, and as such, ColorOS jumped from ColorOS 7 to ColorOS 11 with the launch of Android 11.

It was announced that ColorOS, OnePlus' Oxygen OS, and Realme's Realme UI will merge to form a single Android skin that will appear on all OnePlus, Oppo and Realme phones. However these plans were cancelled as the three UI's are being developed on the same codebase, but they are separate.

== Version history ==
Overview of ColorOS versions
Version	Initial release date	Latest version	Latest release date	Android version(s)
ColorOS 1	September 23, 2013	1.4.3i	August 11, 2014	Android 4.1 – 4.3
ColorOS 2	October 20, 2014	2.1.5i	October 31, 2015	Android 4.4 – 5.1
ColorOS 3	March 17, 2016	3.2	October 26, 2017	Android 5.1 – 7.1.1
ColorOS 5	March 26, 2018	5.2.1	October 16, 2018	Android 7.1.1 - 8.1
ColorOS 6	March 17, 2019	6.1.2	December 20, 2019	Android 9
ColorOS 6	March 17, 2019	6.7	November 6, 2019	Android 10
ColorOS 7	November 26, 2019	7.2	June 5, 2020	Android 10
ColorOS 11	September 14, 2020	11.3	May 27, 2021	Android 11
ColorOS 12	September 16, 2021	12.1	February 24, 2022	Android 11 – 12
ColorOS 13	September 19, 2022	13.2	September 29, 2023	Android 13
ColorOS 14	November 16, 2023	14.1	May 23, 2024	Android 14
ColorOS 15	October 17, 2024	15.0.2	May 23, 2025	Android 15
ColorOS 16	October 28, 2025	16.1 (16.0.10)	August 14, 2026	Android 16
ColorOS 16	October 28, 2025	16.5	September 28, 2026	Android 17
ColorOS 17	October 13, 2026	17.0.1	November 4, 2026	Android 17
Legend: Unsupported Supported Latest version Preview version

== See also ==
- Oppo
- List of Oppo products
