= Oppo =

Chinese consumer electronics manufacturer

OPPO Guangdong Mobile Telecommunications Corp., Ltd.
- Logo used since March 2019
- Type: Private
- Industry: Consumer electronics
- Founded: 10 October 2004; 22 years ago
- Founders: Tony Chen; Jin Leqin; Si Sevong; Duan Yongping
- Headquarters: Shenzhen, Guangdong, China
- Area served: 70+ countries
- Key people: Leo Zhao (CEO)
- Products: Smartphones; Tablet computers; ColorOS; Audiovisual; Hi-Fi; Home cinema
- Owner: BBK Electronics (2004-2023); Guangdong Oujia Holdings Co., Ltd. (2023–present)
- Number of employees: 40,000
- Divisions: Oppo Digital
- Subsidiaries: OnePlus; Realme
- Website: oppo.com

Oppo
- Simplified Chinese: OPPO广东移动通信有限公司
- Traditional Chinese: OPPO廣東移動通信有限公司
- Literal meaning: OPPO Guangdong Mobile Telecommunications Corp., Ltd.
Transcriptions
Standard Mandarin
- Hanyu Pinyin: OPPO Guǎngdōng Yídòng Tōngxìn Yǒuxiàn Gōngsī
Yue: Cantonese
- Jyutping: OPPO gwong2dung1 ji4dung6 tung1seon3 jau5haan6 gung1si1

Oppo (stylized in lowercase "oppo" ) is a private Chinese consumer electronics manufacturer and technology company headquartered in Shenzhen, Guangdong.

Founded in 2004, its major product lines include smartphones, smart devices, audio devices, power banks, and other electronic products.

The company is one of the largest smartphone manufacturers in the world, with around 9% of the global market share, and 600 million global monthly active users across more than 60 markets. The company is also in the top three smartphone brands by sales in 20 regional markets, competing with major smartphone manufacturers like Samsung and Xiaomi.

Oppo also owns other smartphone brands such as Realme and OnePlus.

== History ==
The brand name "Oppo" was registered in China in 2001 and launched in 2004 by Tony Chen in Dongguan, China. In 2005, they introduced their first device internationally, the Oppo X3 MP3 player. Since then, the company has expanded to over 50 countries and become a major player in electronic devices around the world.

In June 2016, Oppo became the largest smartphone manufacturer in China, selling its phones at more than 200,000 retail outlets.

In 2018, Oppo Digital announced that they were discontinuing their disc player business in major markets, and focusing on mobile devices.

In 2019, Oppo was ranked fifth in global smartphone market share.

In 2024, according to data from International Data Corporation (IDG), Oppo ranked fourth in the global smartphone market, securing 8.8% of the total market share with over 103.1 million shipments in 2023. Also in 2024, Oppo ranked sixth globally for granted patents, at 54,000.

== Branding ==
Oppo logo used from 2013 until March 2019

The South Korean boy band 2PM prepared a song known as "Follow Your Soul" in a promotional deal with Oppo for launching its brand in Thailand in 2010. In June 2015, the company signed an agreement with FC Barcelona to become a sponsor of the Spanish football club.

In 2016, the Philippine Basketball Association made Oppo its official smartphone partner, starting at the 2016 PBA Commissioner's Cup.

Oppo hires celebrity endorsers in Vietnam. Sơn Tùng M-TP endorsed three smartphone units: Neo 5, Neo 7, and F1s. Oppo made a sponsorship to one of Vietnam's top-rated reality shows, The Face Vietnam.

In 2017, Oppo won the bid to sponsor the India national cricket team, which allowed their logo to be used on the team's kits from 2017 to 2019.

In 2019, Oppo became a sponsoring partner of the French Open tennis tournament held in Roland-Garros, Paris. The same year, they also became a sponsoring partner of Wimbledon Championships for 5 years as the first official smartphone partner.

Since the 2019 World Championship, Oppo has been the exclusive global smartphone partner for Riot Games and its League of Legends Esports tournament.

In March 2024, the company introduced Seventeen's subunit BSS as their brand ambassadors in the Asia-Pacific region, wherein they first marketed the Oppo Reno 11F.

== Products ==
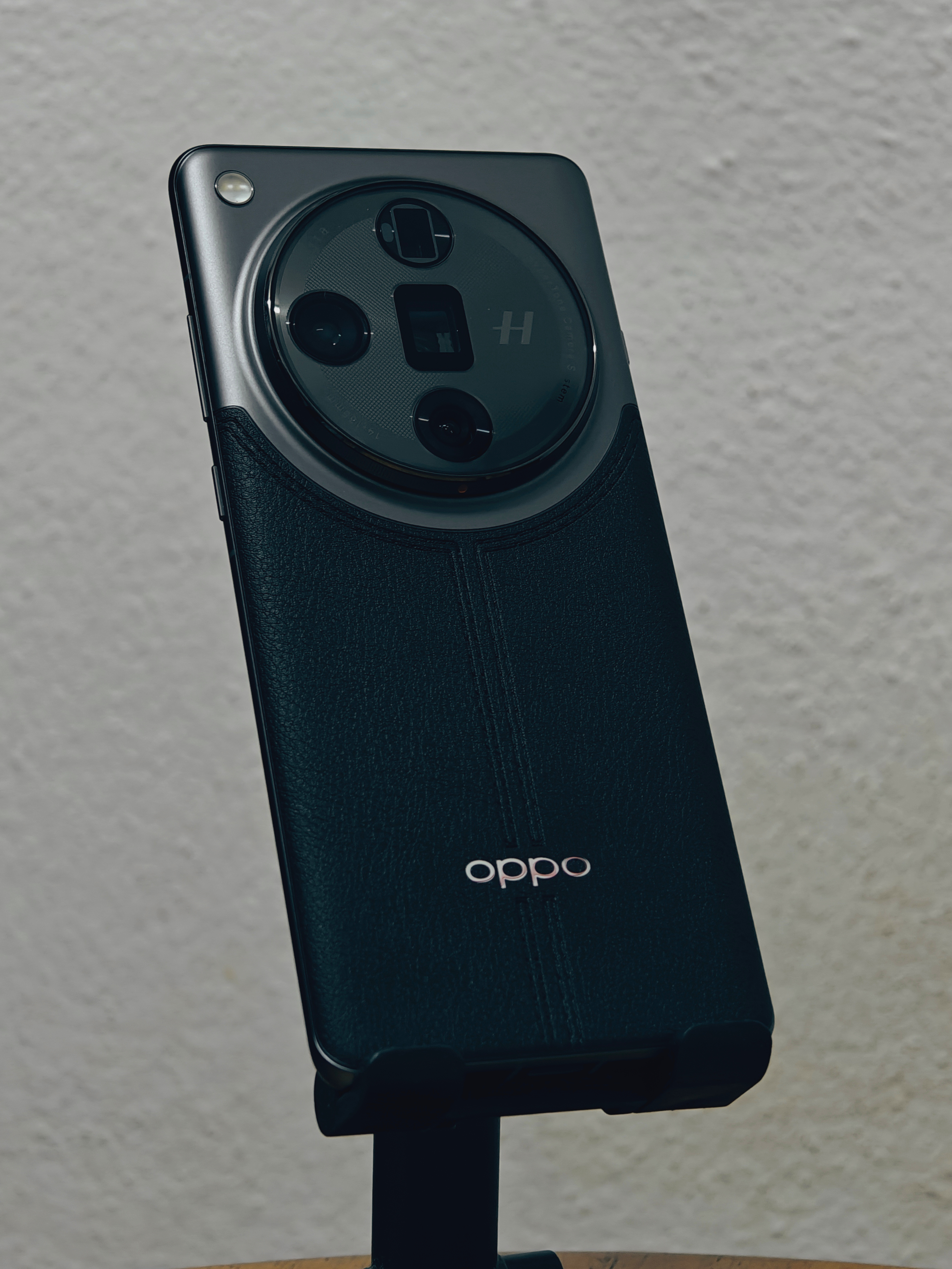
Oppo Find X7 Ultra, the company's flagship phone of 2024

=== Headphones and amplifiers ===
Released in 2015, the HA-2, was a portable version of the HA-1 amp/DAC, which featured a battery pack option and a stitched leather casing. The phone played music in real-time to the HA-2 (via the included Android micro USB cable or iOS lightning cable, or USB cable if from PC).

It can also be charged using an included "rapid charger" charging kit. The battery pack feature can only be used simultaneously while the HA-2 is used to play music if the playing (source) device is an Apple iOS device. In October 2016, an updated version was released with a new DAC chip and now named HA-2SE. Otherwise, it was the same as the HA-2.

=== Smartwatches ===
Oppo launched its first smartwatch, the OPPO Watch, on 6 March 2020 in the Chinese domestic market. The next year, they followed up with the OPPO Watch 2, then in 2022 with the Watch 3 Pro, and in 2024 with the Watch 4 Pro.

== Research and development ==
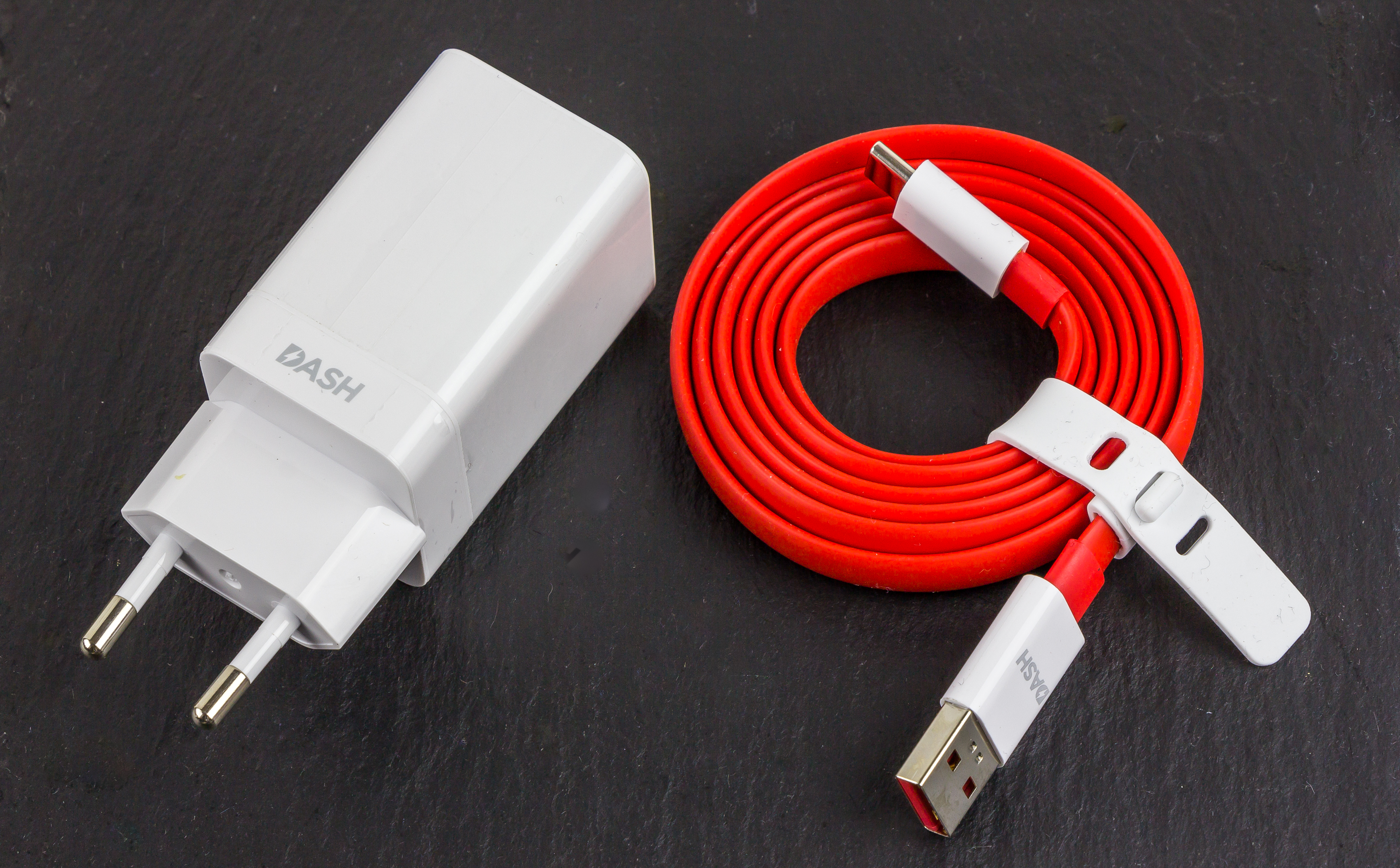
Dash Charge for OnePlus 5

=== VOOC/SuperVOOC ===
VOOC (Voltage Open Loop Multi-step Constant-Current Charging) is a fast charging method for Oppo phones unveiled in 2014. VOOC and SuperVOOC comes in a few variations:

- VOOC 2.0 (2015), same as the first version that was introduced in 2014, which operates at 5V/4A.
- SuperVOOC (2016), a successor of VOOC 2.0 with 10 V/5 A (50W). It charges a two-cell battery in series. It is based on "low voltage pulse" charging that works in conjunction with a customized battery.
- VOOC 3.0 (2019), Advertised as 23.8% faster than VOOC 2.0. 5V/6A, also marketed as Warp Charge 30.
- VOOC 4.0 (2019 Sep), a successor of VOOC 3.0, which operates at 5 V/6 A (30W). It can charge the phone up to 67% in 30 minutes.
- SuperVOOC 2.0 (2020), 10V/6.5A. Alternate name: Warp Charge 65.
- SuperVOOC 2.0 (2022), 11V/7.3A. Alternate names: Warp Charge 80, SuperDART, and Super Flash Charge. For regions that use a voltage of 100-125V, including Japan, Taiwan, North America, and Latin America, the charging supports up to 66W.
- 240 W version of SuperVOOC (2022). 20V/12A. Announced at 2022 Mobile World Congress. It is advertised as being able to charge 4,500 mAh battery in 9 minutes. It is implemented by Realme GT Neo5, which requires the use of bundled proprietary charger and proprietary USB-C cable to utilize the advertised charging rate. The power is delivered through the cable at 20 V and converted to 10 V inside the handset by 3 charge controller chips, each rated 100 W max, before finally being stepped down to 4.5 V for the battery.

VOOC cable, comes in three variants, 6.5 amp 10 volt, 10 amp 10 volt and 13.7 amp 11 volt, respectively.

=== HyperTone camera systems ===
In November 2023, at Paris Photo 2023, OPPO and Hasselblad revealed their collaboration to develop the next generation of HyperTone camera systems in 2024, focusing on aesthetics and computational photography. These systems will debut in upcoming Find series flagship smartphones, promising users "an unparalleled mobile imaging experience".

In 2023, the World Intellectual Property Organization (WIPO)'s Annual PCT Review ranked Oppo's number of patent applications published under the PCT System as 9th in the world, with 1,766 patent applications being published during 2023.

== Criticism ==
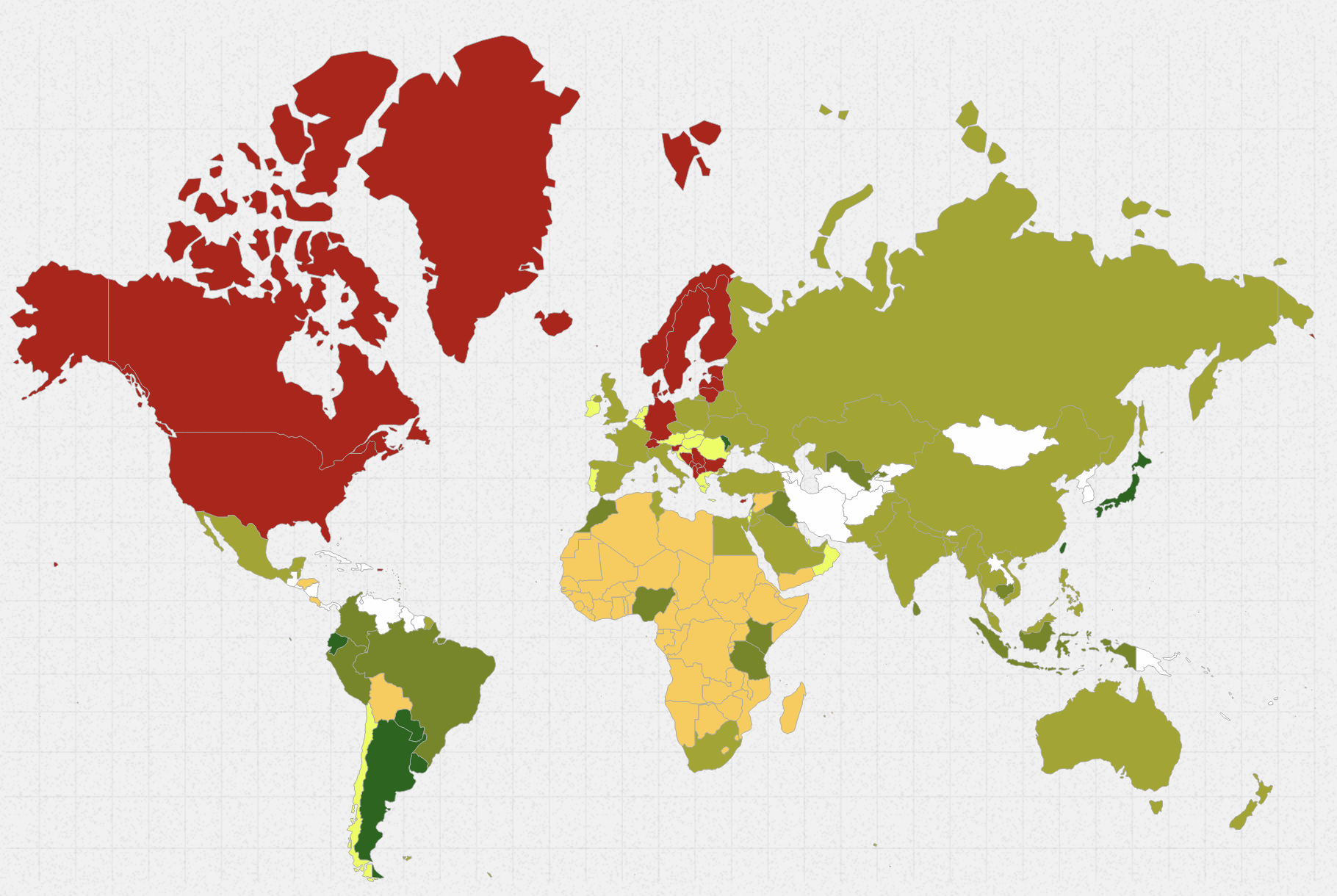
Serving area of several Oppo brands according to the official site of Oppo, OnePlus and Realme: Countries and regions with Oppo, OnePlus & Realme products selling Countries and regions with Oppo & OnePlus products selling Countries and regions with Oppo & Realme products selling Countries and regions with only Oppo products selling Countries and regions with only OnePlus products selling Countries and regions with only Realme products selling Countries and regions without Oppo products selling

=== Germany ===
In 2022, Finnish telecommunications equipment supplier Nokia filed a lawsuit accusing Oppo of using its technology patents without paying a license fee. In August, a German court halted sales of Oppo smartphones.

=== India ===
Oppo has also faced challenges in India, a market it expanded into in 2014. In July 2022, the Indian government announced a fine of 43.8 billion rupees ($550 million at the time) against Oppo's local subsidiary for tax evasion.

=== Thailand ===
In 2025, Oppo and Realme phones sold in Thailand came with a preinstalled illegal loan app that could be disabled but not uninstalled. Following public outcry, the companies announced that they would cease this practice.

== See also ==
- Oppo Digital, an independently operated division of Oppo specialized in designing and marketing audio and video equipment
- ColorOS
- List of Oppo products
