= Signal-to-noise ratio (imaging) =

Measure of image quality

Signal-to-noise ratio (SNR) is used in imaging to characterize image quality. The sensitivity of a (digital or film) imaging system is typically described in the terms of the signal level that yields a threshold level of SNR.

Industry standards define sensitivity in terms of the ISO film speed equivalent, using SNR thresholds (at average scene luminance) of 40:1 for "excellent" image quality and 10:1 for "acceptable" image quality.

SNR is sometimes quantified in decibels (dB) of signal power relative to noise power, though in the imaging field the concept of "power" is sometimes taken to be the power of a voltage signal proportional to optical power; so a 20 dB SNR may mean either 10:1 or 100:1 optical power, depending on which definition is in use.

== Definition of SNR ==
Traditionally, SNR is defined to be the ratio of the average signal value $\mu_\mathrm{sig}$ to the standard deviation of the signal $\sigma_\mathrm{sig}$:

$$\mathrm{SNR} = \frac{\mu_\mathrm{sig}}{\sigma_\mathrm{sig}}$$

when the signal is an optical intensity, or as the square of this value if the signal and noise are viewed as amplitudes (field quantities).

== See also ==
- Coefficient of variation
- Contrast-to-noise ratio
- Minimum resolvable contrast
- Minimum resolvable temperature difference
- Optical transfer function
- Signal-to-noise ratio
- Signal transfer function
