= Oppo Neo 5 (2015) =

Android Smartphone from Oppo

Oppo Neo 5 (2015), Oppo Neo 5s
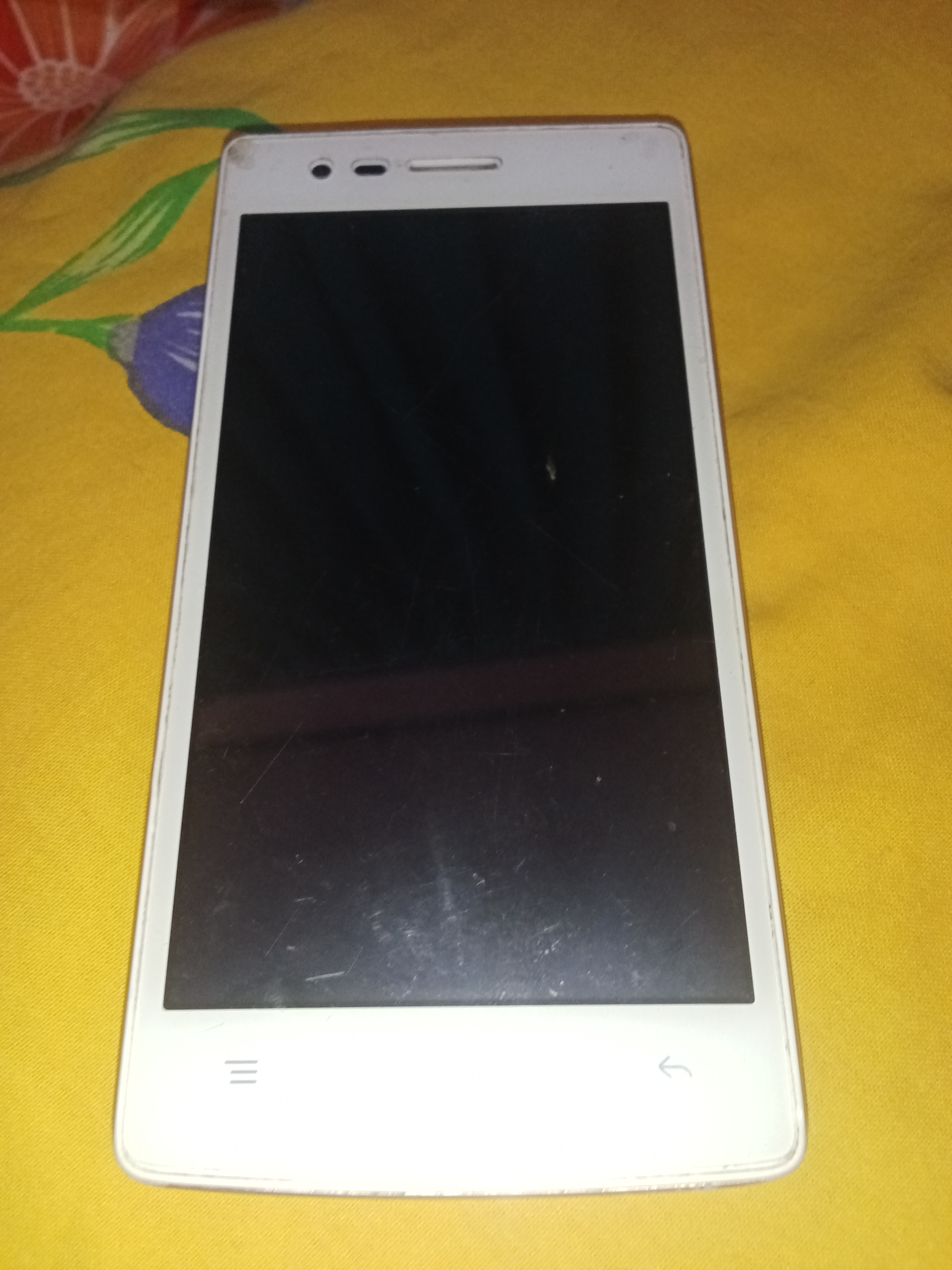
- Brand: Oppo
- Series: Oppo Neo Series
- First released: August 2015 (Neo 5 (2015)); May 2015 (Neo 5s)
- Predecessor: Oppo Neo 5
- Successor: Oppo Neo 7
- Compatible networks: Neo 5 (2015): 2G bands: GSM 850 / 900 / 1800 / 1900; 3G bands: HSDPA 850 / 900 / 1900 / 2100; 3G bands: HSDPA 2100 - Vietnam, India, Indonesia, Bangladesh, Morocco, Algeria, Iran; HSDPA 850 / 900 / 2100 - Other regions; HSPA; Neo 5s: 2G bands: GSM 850 / 900 / 1800 / 1900; 3G bands: HSDPA 850 / 900 / 1900 / 2100; 4G bands: 1, 3, 7; 1, 4, 7 - for Mexico; HSPA 42.2/5.76 Mbit/s, LTE Cat4 150/50 Mbit/s
- Dimensions: 131.9x65.5x8 mm; 5.19x2.58x0.31 in
- Weight: 135 g (4.76 oz)
- Operating system: ColorOS 2 running on Android 4.4.2
- System-on-chip: MediaTek MT6582 (Neo 5 (2015)); Qualcomm MSM8916 Snapdragon 410 (Neo 5s)
- CPU: 4x1.2 GHz ARM Cortex-A7 (Neo 5 (2015)); 4x1.2 GHz ARM Cortex-A53 (Neo 5s)
- GPU: Mali-400MP2; Adreno 306
- Memory: 1GB Single channel, 533 MHz
- Storage: 8GB
- Removable storage: microSDXC
- Battery: Non-removable Li-Po, 2000mAh
- Charging: microUSB 2.0, USB On-The-Go
- Rear camera: CMOS, f/2.2, 5 lens, 3264x2448 (7.99MP), Video: 720p at 30fps
- Front camera: f/2.8, 1600x1200 (1.92MP), Video: 480p at 30fps
- Display: Type: IPS LCD; Size: 4.5 inches, 55.8 cm^2; Resolution: 480x854, 218 ppi; Ratios: 16:9 aspect ratio, 64.6% StB ratio
- Sound: Loudspeaker: Yes; 3.5mm jack: Yes
- Media: Audio: AAC, AMR / AMR-NB / GSM-AMR, MIDI, MP3, WMA, WAV; Video: 3GPP, AAVI, H.263, H.264 / MPEG-4 Part 10 / AVC video, MP4, WMV, Xvid
- Connectivity: Wi-Fi 802.11 b/g/n, hotspot; Bluetooth 4.0, A2DP; A-GPS; FM radio; microUSB 2.0, USB On-The-Go
- Data inputs: Accelerometer; Proximity sensor; Magnetometer
- Other: Colors: Blue, White

The Oppo Neo 5 (2015) and Oppo Neo 5s are refreshes of the Oppo Neo 5. The key difference between the refreshed 5 and 5s models is the 4G connectivity in the 5s, which the 5 lacks. The 5 and 5s cost €70 and €160, respectively.

== Specification ==
The Oppo Neo 5 (2015) was released in August 2015. It features a 4.5-inch IPS LCD with a resolution of 480 x 854 pixels, resulting in a pixel density of approximately 218 ppi. It is powered by a Mediatek MT6582 (28 nm) chipset, featuring a quad-core 1.3 GHz Cortex-A7 CPU and a Mali-400MP2 GPU. It runs on Android 4.4.2 (KitKat) with Oppo's ColorOS 2.
