= Oppo Neo 5 =

Android Smartphone from Oppo

- Also known as: Oppo Neo 5 (4G)
- Brand: Oppo
- Series: Oppo Neo Series
- Predecessor: Oppo Neo 3
- Successor: Oppo Neo 7
- Compatible networks: 2G bands: GSM 850 / 900 / 1800 / 1900; 3G bands: HSDPA 2100; HSPA, 42.2/5.76 Mbit/s
- Dimensions: 132x65.8x9.2 mm; 5.20x2.59x0.36 in
- Weight: 132.5 g (4.69 oz)
- System-on-chip: Qualcomm Snapdragon 400
- CPU: 4x1.2 GHz Cortex-A7
- GPU: Adreno 305
- Memory: 1GB
- Storage: 4GB
- Removable storage: microSDHC (Up to 32 GB)
- Battery: 1900 mAh
- Charging: microUSB 2.0
- Rear camera: CMOS BSI, f/2.4, 2592x1944 (5.04MP), Video: 720p at 30fps
- Front camera: f/2.8, 1600x1200 (1.92MP), Video: 480p at 30fps
- Display: Type: IPS LCD; Size: 4.5 inches, 55.8 cm^2; Resolution: 480x854, 218 ppi; Ratios: 16:9 aspect ratio, 64.2% StB ratio
- Sound: Loudspeaker: Yes; 3.5mm jack: Yes
- Media: Audio: AAC, AMR / AAMR-NB / GSM-AMR, eAAC+ / aacPlus v2 / HE-AAC v2, FLAC, MIDI, MP3, OGG, WMA, WAV; Video: 3GPP, AVI, Flash Video, MKV, QuickTime, MP4, MPEG-4, WMV
- Connectivity: Wi-Fi 802.11 b/g/n, Wi-Fi Direct, hotspot; Bluetooth 4.0, A2DP; A-GPS; FM radio; microUSB 2.0, USB On-The-Go
- Data inputs: Proximity sensor; Light; Accelerometer; Magnetometer
- Model: 1201, R831L
- Other: Colors: Black; Price: About €140

The Oppo Neo 5 is the 3rd phone in the Oppo Neo Series. It is also known by the alias Oppo Neo 5 (4G) to distinguish it from other variants of the Neo 5 (Oppo Neo 5 (2015), Oppo Neo 5s). One of the selling points of the phone, as mentioned by the phones' official website, is a "Double-layer Metallic Structure" which Oppo claims gives the phone a thinner chassis and better heat dissipation.

== Specification ==
=== Hardware ===
The Oppo Neo 5 was released in August 2014, and it features a 4.5-inch IPS LCD (480 x 854 pixels). It's powered by a Qualcomm Snapdragon 400 (28 nm) quad-core 1.2 GHz CPU with 1 GB RAM and 4 GB internal storage (expandable via microSD). For optics, it includes a 5 MP main camera with LED flash and a 2 MP selfie camera. A removable 1900 mAh Li-Ion battery provides power.
