= Oppo Neo 3 =

Second phone in Oppo's Neo Series

- Brand: Oppo
- Series: Oppo Neo Series
- First released: August 2014
- Predecessor: Oppo Neo
- Successor: Oppo Neo 5
- Compatible networks: 2G bands: GSM 850 / 900 / 1800 / 1900; 3G bands: HSDPA 2100; HSPA
- Dimensions: 132x65.8x9.2 mm; 5.20x2.59x0.36 in
- Weight: 128 g (4.52 oz)
- Operating system: Android 4.2.1
- System-on-chip: MediaTek MT6572
- CPU: 2x1.3GHz ARM Cortex-A7
- GPU: ARM Mail-400 MP1, 1 core, 500MHz
- Memory: 1GB LPDDR2, 266MHz
- Storage: 4GB
- Removable storage: microSDHC (up to 32GB)
- Battery: Removable Li-ion, 1900mAh
- Charging: microUSB 2.0
- Rear camera: 2592x1944 (5.04MP), Video: 720p at 30fps
- Front camera: 1600x1200 (1.92MP)
- Display: Type: IPS LCD; Size: 4.5 inches, 55.8 cm^2; Resolution: 480x854, 218 ppi; Ratios: 16:9 aspect ratio, 64.2% StB ratio
- Sound: Loudspeaker: Yes; 3.5mm jack: Yes
- Media: Audio: AAC, eAAC+ / aacPlus v2 / HE-AAC v2, FLAC, M4A, MIDI, MP3, OGG, WAV; Video: 3GPP, AVI, Flash Video, H.263, H.264 / MPEG-4 Part 10 / AVC video, MKV, MP4, WMV
- Connectivity: WLAN: Wi-Fi 802.11 b/g/n, hotspot; Bluetooth 2.1; A-GPS; FM radio; microUSB 2.0, USB On-The-Go
- Data inputs: Accelerometer; Proximity sensor
- Model: R831K
- Other: Colors: White, Black; Price: About €130

The Oppo Neo 3 is the second phone in Oppo's Neo Series. It went on sale for an initial pricing of ₹8577 in India in August 2014.

== Specification ==
=== Hardware ===
The Oppo R831K (Neo 3) features a 4.5-inch IPS LCD (480 x 854 pixels). It's powered by a MediaTek MT6572 (28 nm) dual-core 1.3 GHz CPU with 1 GB RAM and 4 GB internal storage, expandable via microSD. Key hardware includes a 5 MP main camera with LED flash and a 2 MP selfie camera. It runs on a removable 1900 mAh Li-Ion battery and supports dual SIM functionality.
