= MX-2900ZOOM =

Made by Fujifilm, the MX-2900 was an early consumer level digital camera with a 2.3 megapixel CCD sensor and Optical resolution up to 1800 x 1200 pixels. As with all technology, the MX-2900 was surpassed by newer, faster and higher resolution digital cameras and is a now an obsolete model no longer in production.
