= C4H7BrO2 =

The molecular formula C_{4}H_{7}BrO_{2} (molar mass: 167.002 g/mol, exact mass: 165.9629 u) may refer to:

- 2-Bromobutyric acid
- Ethyl bromoacetate
