= Siemens star =

Optical testing device

A Siemens star

A Siemens star with defocus error shows spurious resolution, in the form of alternating bands.

A Siemens star, or spoke target, is a device used to test the resolution of optical instruments, printers, and displays. It consists of a pattern of bright "spokes" on a dark background that radiate from a common center and become wider as they get further from it. In concept, the spokes only meet at the exact center of the star – the spokes, and the gaps between them, become narrower the closer to the center one looks, but they never touch except at the center. When printed or displayed on a device with limited resolution, however, the spokes touch at some distance from the center. The smallest gap visible is limited by the smallest dot of ink the printer can produce, making the Siemens star a useful tool for comparing two printers' resolutions (DPI). Similarly, it can be applied to a camera's optical resolution by taking photographs of a Siemens star printed at high resolution and comparing photographs from different cameras, to see which retained the center detail the closest.

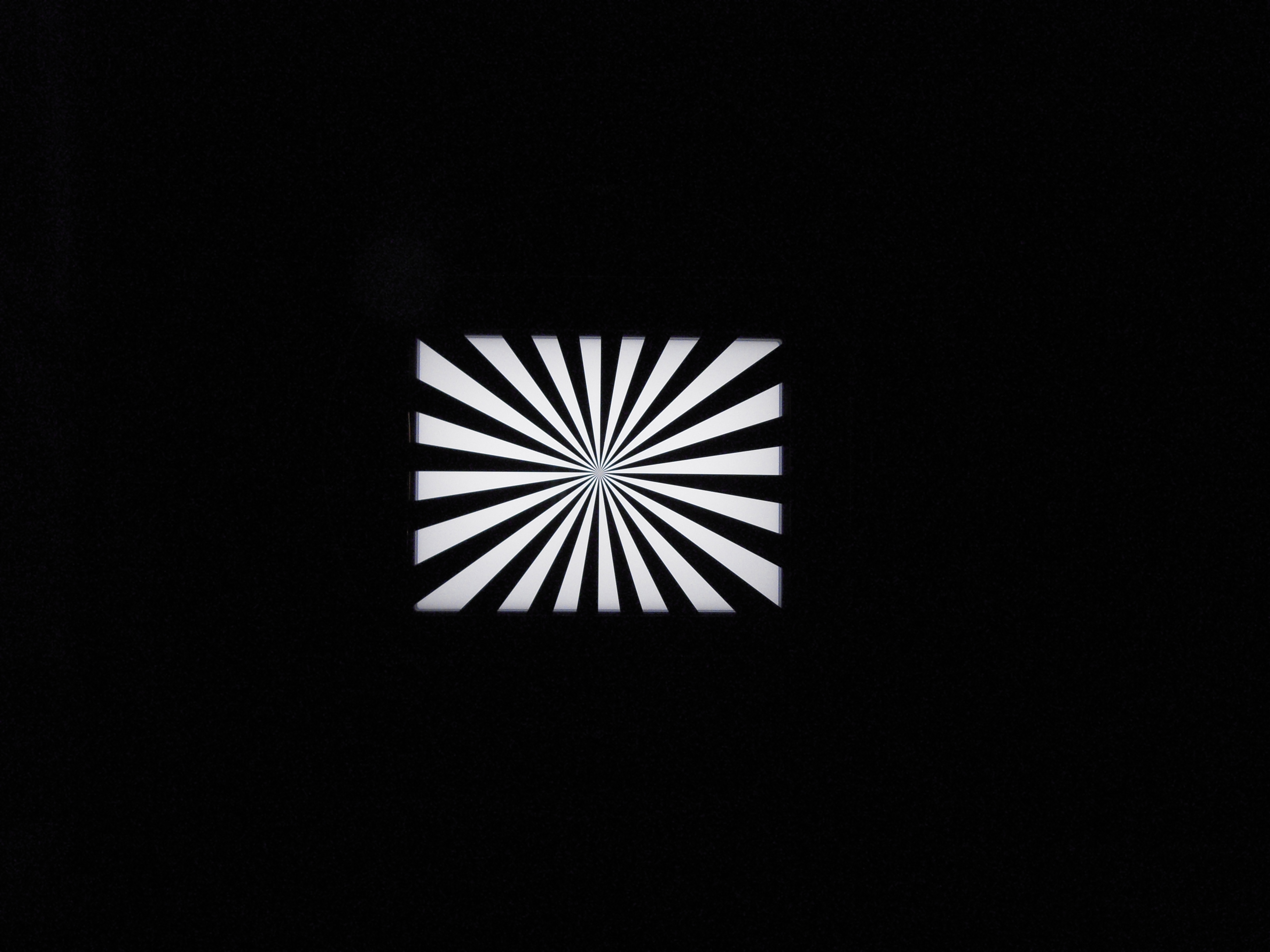
A Siemens chart filter in a collimator, used for auto-focus calibration of digital still cameras

In the field of video production, where it is often called a back focus chart, the Siemens star is widely used to adjust the back focus of removable lenses. It is also used during film or video shoots to help setting the focus in special situations.

Siemens stars are similar to the sunburst pattern used as a background in graphic design, as in the Japanese Naval Ensign, Russian Air Force flag and Jordanian Royal Standard. They are useful in drawing the eye to a point on the page.

A Siemens star with 128 spokes. It shows aliasing in the center, where the spokes are smaller than the pixel pitch. (It is not blurred or aberrated, so it does not show spurious resolution.)

Under optical blur from defocus, a Siemens star (like any periodic pattern) gives rise to the phenomenon of spurious resolution above the resolution limit, i.e. toward the center of the Siemens star. (Spurious resolution appears similar to aliasing, but it is a purely optical phenomenon, so it occurs without need of pixels.) This results in inverted polarity of the stripe pattern: black stripes appear in the place of white stripes and vice versa (and further polarity inversions occur further inward). (The illustration under Optical transfer function shows spurious resolution caused by blurring.) When looking at the Siemens star with slightly blurred vision, e.g., without spectacles or with defocus from staring, this is seen as a shimmering ring around the Siemens star's center that changes size with viewing distance.

The star was developed by Siemens & Halske AG (today Siemens) in the 1930s to test the lenses of Siemens narrow-film cameras.

== See also ==
- Secchi disk
