= Minimum resolvable temperature difference =

Minimum resolvable temperature difference (MRTD) is a measure for assessing the performance of infrared cameras, and is inversely proportional to the modulation transfer function.

Typically, an operator is asked to assess the minimum temperature difference at which a 4-bar target can be resolved. This minimum difference will change with the spatial frequency of the bar target used. A curve of MRTD against spatial frequency is obtained which characterises the performance of the imaging system.

Modern infrared imaging systems can have low spatial frequency MRTDs of tens of millikelvins.

== Manual test ==
A manual subjective test is implemented to determine the MRTD. An operator uses a series of 4-bar targets of different spatial frequencies. For each target he/she adjusts the blackbody, (source of Infrared radiation), temperature up and down until the pattern is "just resolvable." The positive and negative temperature differences are stored into a two dimensional array. The corresponding spatial frequencies used in each test are also stored into an array. The MRTD curve is a plot of these arrays (just resolvable temperature difference versus target spatial frequency). From the experimental MRTD data, a general polynomial best fit is calculated and the result is the MRTD curve which gives direct insight into the quality of the image. i.e. the infrared camera's ability to resolve detail, in this case temperature.

=== Calculations ===
$F(x) = \frac{\Delta\,t(i)}{f_s(i)}$, the MRTD curve

$\Delta\,t(i)$ = array of just resolvable temperature differences
$f_s(i)\,\!$ = array of spatial frequencies

== Minimum detectable temperature difference ==
Minimum detectable temperature difference (MDTD), also called minimum detectable temperature (MDT), is not the same phenomenon as MRTD and is only subtly different. Like MRTD, it is a measure of the performance of infrared cameras. However, MDTD is a measure of visibility, not resolvability.

=== Manual test ===
The manual subjective test for MDTD is similar to the one for MRTD. A trained operator views a series of pinhole targets at different spatial frequencies. For each series of pinhole targets the operator ramps the blackbody (source of IR radiation) up and down until the targets are "just visible". The data at which the pinhole targets are "just visible" is stored into an array and plotted against spatial frequency, and a curve is fitted to the data. The MDTD curve is thus defined as the $\Delta\,$ temperature versus spatial frequency.

Here the relevant spatial frequency is f = 1/W where W is the angular subtense of the target.

== See also ==
- Thermography
- Infrared
- Minimum resolvable contrast
- Modulation transfer function (infrared imaging)
- Optical transfer function
- Signal-to-noise ratio (imaging)
