= 2-Bromobutyric acid =

Chemical compound

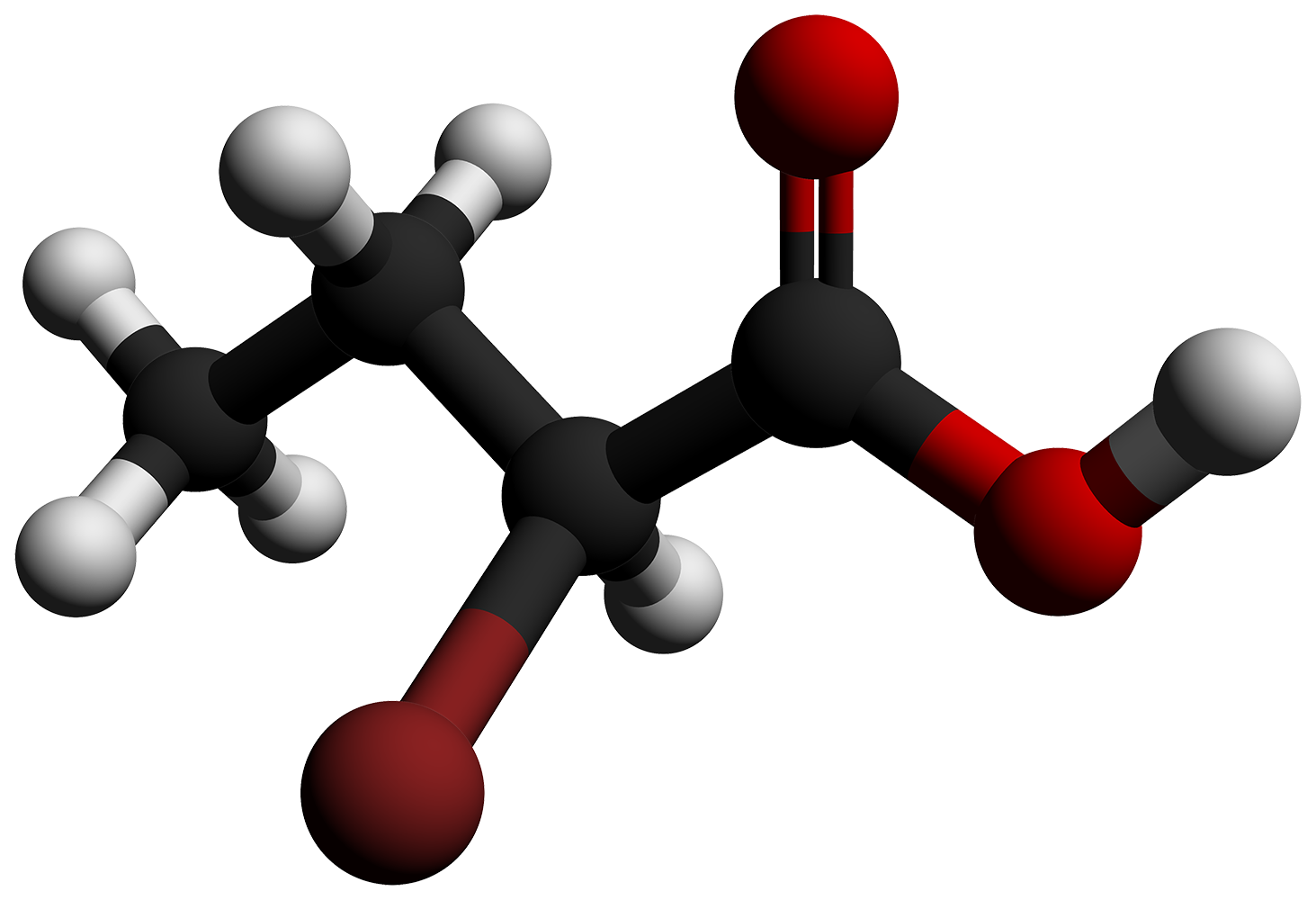

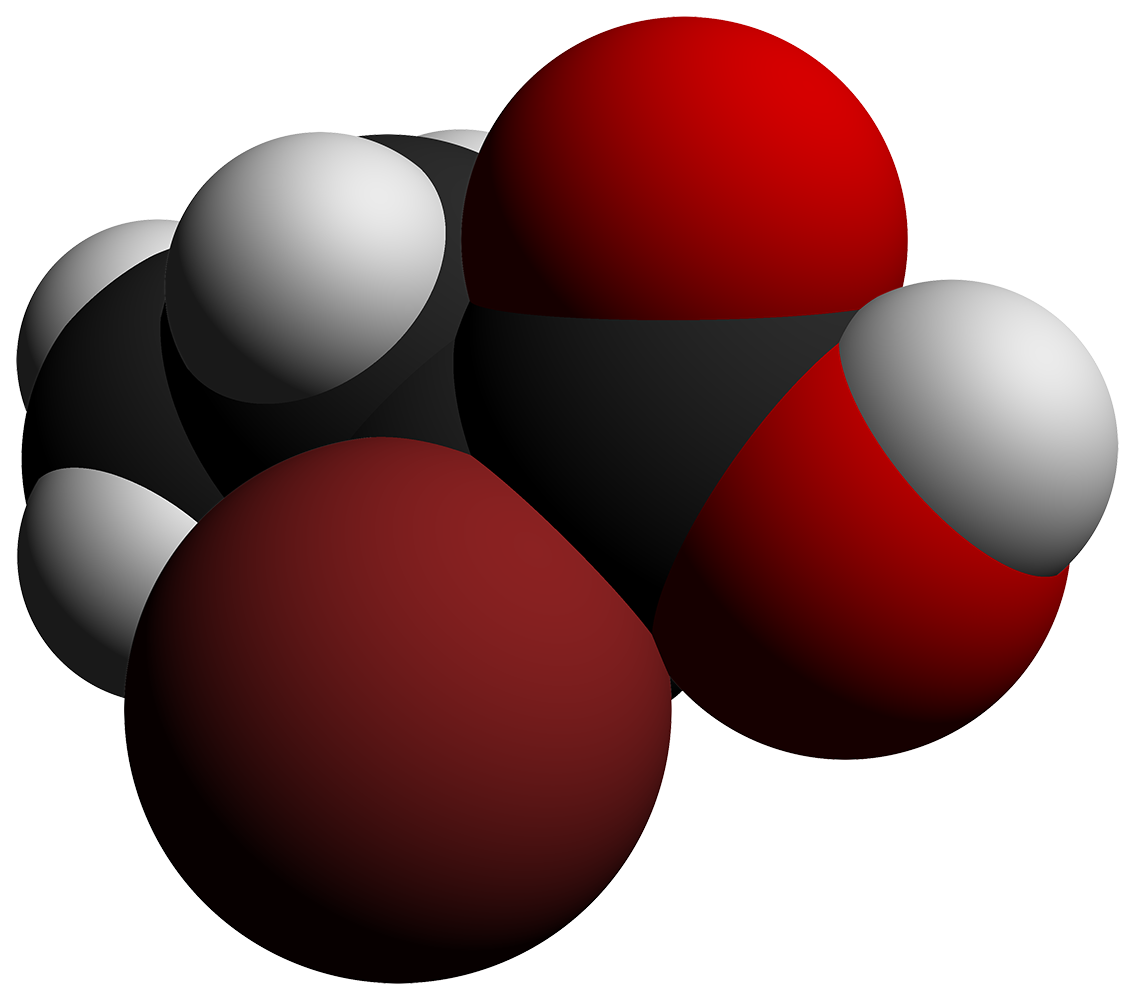

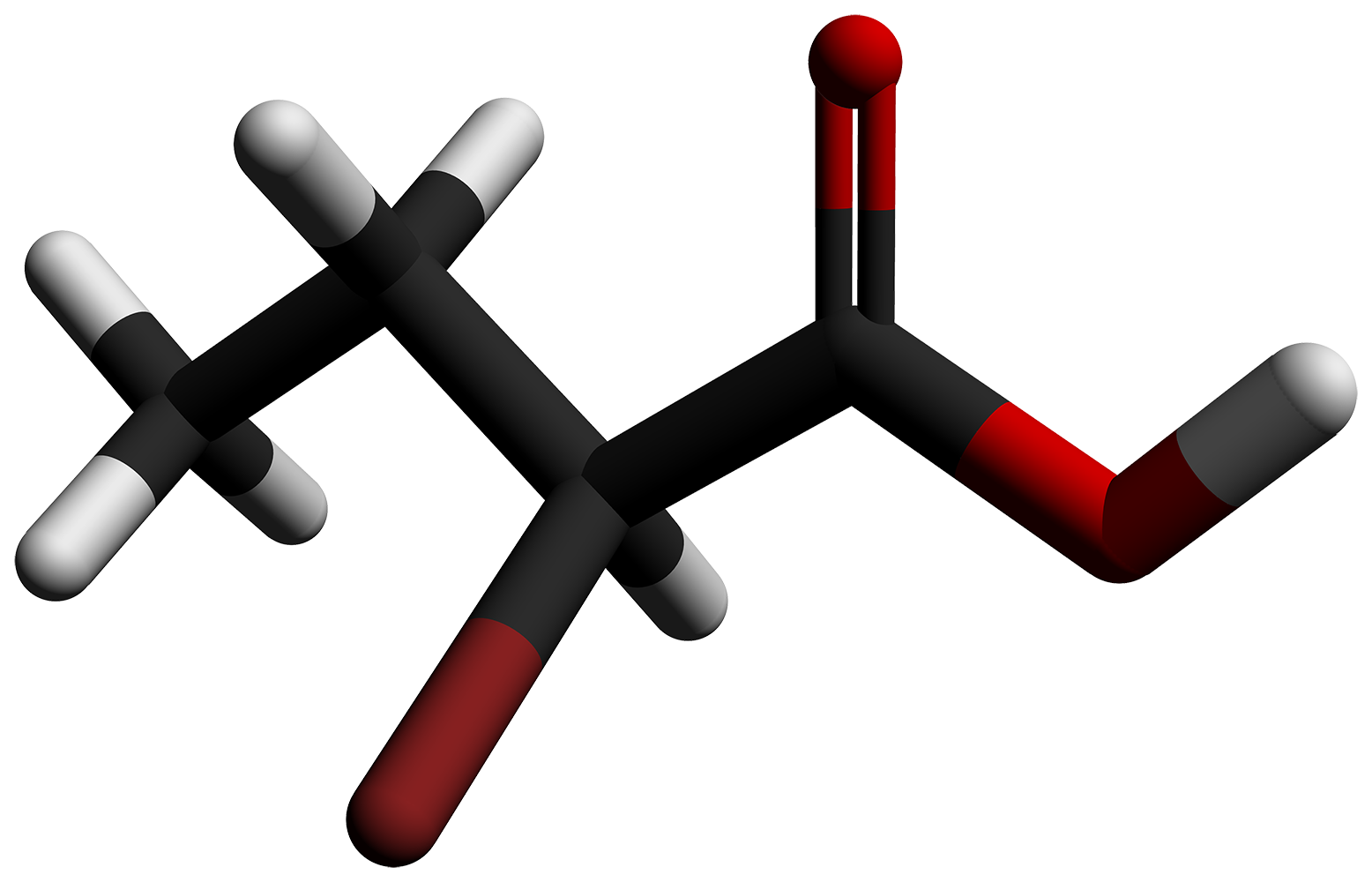

Names
- Preferred IUPAC name 2-Bromobutanoic acid
- Other names 2-Bromobutyric acid alpha-Bromobytyric acid dl-2-Bromobutyric acid α-Bromobutyricacid

Identifiers
CAS Number	80-58-0 racemic; 2681-94-9 R enantiomer; 32659-49-7 S enantiomer
3D model (JSmol)	Interactive image
ChemSpider	6403
ECHA InfoCard	100.001.177
EC Number	201-294-5
PubChem CID	6655
UNII	MCO6PW23BT
CompTox Dashboard (EPA)	DTXSID90861642
- InChI: InChI=1S/C4H7BrO2/c1-2-3(5)4(6)7/h3H,2H2,1H3,(H,6,7) Key: YAQLSKVCTLCIIE-UHFFFAOYSA-N; InChI=1/C4H7BrO2/c1-2-3(5)4(6)7/h3H,2H2,1H3,(H,6,7) Key: YAQLSKVCTLCIIE-UHFFFAOYAL
- SMILES: CCC(Br)C(=O)O

Properties
Chemical formula	C_{4}H_{7}BrO_{2}
Molar mass	167.002 g·mol^{−1}
Appearance	colorless liquid
Density	1.567 g/mL at 25 °C
Melting point	−4 °C (25 °F; 269 K) racemate
Boiling point	99 to 103 °C (210 to 217 °F; 372 to 376 K) 10 mmHg
Solubility in water	66 g/L (20 °C)
Vapor pressure	0.0533 Torr
Acidity (pK_{a})	2.95±0.10. Most Acidic Temp: 25 °C

Hazards
- Occupational safety and health (OHS/OSH)
Main hazards	Causes severe skin burns and eye damage. Causes serious eye damage. Harmful if swallowed.
- GHS labelling
Pictograms	(GHS05: Corrosive) (GHS07: Exclamation mark)
Signal word	Danger
Hazard statements	H302, H314
Precautionary statements	P260, P264, P270, P280, P301+P312, P301+P330+P331, P303+P361+P353, P304+P340, P305+P351+P338, P310, P321, P330, P363, P405, P501
Flash point	> 112 °C (234 °F; 385 K)

Related compounds
Other anions	2-Bromobutyride
- Except where otherwise noted, data are given for materials in their standard state (at 25 °C [77 °F], 100 kPa). Infobox references

2-Bromobutyric acid is the organic compound with the molecular formula CH_{3}CH_{2}CH(Br)CO_{2}H. It is a colorless liquid.

The 2-position is stereogenic, so the compound is chiral. Optical resolution can be effected using strychnine.

2-Bromobutyric acid is used as a building block chemical, such as in the preparation of Levetiracetam, an anticonvulsant medication.

== Production ==
(±)-2-Bromobuyric acid may be prepared by the acid-catalyzed Hell–Volhard–Zelinsky reaction, where butyric acid is treated with elemental bromine. It is one of many compounds that arise adventiously from the use of bromine as an antiseptic.
