= Johnson's criteria =

Term in the study of vision devices

Johnson's criteria, or the Johnson criteria, created by John Johnson, describe both spatial domain and frequency domain approaches to analyze the ability of observers to perform visual tasks using image intensifier technology. It was an important breakthrough in evaluating the performance of visual devices and guided the development of future systems. Using Johnson's criteria, many predictive models for sensor technology have been developed that predict the performance of sensor systems under different environmental and operational conditions.

== History ==
Night vision systems enabled the measurement of visual thresholds following World War II. The 1950s also marked a time of notable development in the performance modeling of night vision imaging systems. From 1957 to 1958, Johnson, a United States Army Night Vision & Electronic Sensors Directorate (NVESD) scientist, was working to develop methods of predicting target detection, orientation, recognition, and identification. Working with volunteer observers, Johnson used image intensifier equipment to measure the volunteer observer's ability to identify scale model targets under various conditions. His experiments produced the first empirical data on perceptual thresholds that was expressed in terms of line pairs. In the first Night Vision Image Intensifier Symposium in October 1958, Johnson presented his findings in a paper entitled "Analysis of Image Forming Systems", which contained the list that would later be known as Johnson's criteria.

== Criteria ==
The minimum required resolution according to Johnson's criteria are expressed in terms of line pairs of image resolution across a target, in terms of several tasks:

- Detection, an object is present (1.0 +/− 0.25 line pairs)
- Orientation, symmetrical, asymmetric, horizontal, or vertical (1.4 +/− 0.35 line pairs)
- Recognition, the type object can be discerned, a person versus a car (4 +/− 0.8 line pairs)
- Identification, a specific object can be discerned, a woman versus a man, the specific car (6.4 +/− 1.5 line pairs)

These amounts of resolution give a 50 percent probability of an observer discriminating an object to the specified level.

Additionally, the line pairs refer to lines being displayed on an interlaced CRT monitor. Each line pair corresponds to 2 pixels of a film image, or an image displayed on an LCD monitor.
