= Oppo Neo 7 =

Android Smartphone from Oppo

- Brand: Oppo
- Series: Oppo Neo Series
- First released: October 2015
- Successor: None
- Compatible networks: 2G bands: GSM 850 / 900 / 1800 / 1900; 3G bands: HSDPA 850 / 900 / 1900 / 2100; HSDPA 2100 - India; HSDPA 850 / 900 / 2100 - 3G model; 4G bands: 1, 3, 5, 7, 8, 20, 40 - Global; Bands 1, 2, 4, 7, 17 - USA; Bands 3, 40 - India; HSPA 42.2/5.76 Mbit/s, LTE Cat4 150/50 Mbit/s - 4G model; HSPA 21.1/5.76 Mbit/s - 3G model
- Dimensions: 142.7x71.7x7.6 mm; 5.62x2.82x0.30 in
- Weight: 141 g (4.97 oz)
- Operating system: ColorOS 2.1 running on Android 5.1
- System-on-chip: MediaTek MT6582 (3G model); MSM8916 Snapdragon 410 (4G model)
- CPU: 4x1.3 GHz Cortex-A7 (3G model); 4x1.2 GHz Cortex-A53 (4G model)
- GPU: Mali-400MP2 (3G model); Adreno 306 (4G model)
- Memory: 1GB single channel LPDDR3, 533 MHz
- Storage: 16 GB (9.7 GB user available) eMMC 4.5
- Removable storage: microSDXC
- Battery: Non-removable Li-Po, 2420mAh
- Charging: microUSB 2.0
- Rear camera: Single-Camera Setup; OmniVision PureCel OV8858; 8 MP (3264x2448), f/2.0, 1/4.0", 1.12 μm, AF, CMOS BSI; Camera features: LED flash, HDR, Panorama, UltraHD (up to 24 MP); Video recording: 1080p@30fps
- Front camera: Samsung S5K5E2; 5 MP (2560x1920), f/2.4, 1/5.0", 1.12 μm, FF; Video recording: 720p@30fps
- Display: Type: IPS LCD; Size: 5.0 inches, 68.9 cm^2; Resolution: 540x960, 220 ppi; Ratios: 16:9 aspect ratio, 67.4% StB ratios
- Sound: Loudspeaker: Yes; 3.5mm jack: Yes
- Media: Audio: AAC, AMR / AAMR-NB / GSM-AMR, eAAC+ / aacPlus v2 / HE-AAC v2, FLAC, MIDI, MP3, OGG, WMA, WAV; Video: 3GPP, AVI, MKV, MP4, WebM, WMV, Xvid
- Connectivity: Wi-Fi 802.11 b/g/n, hotspot; Bluetooth 4.0, A2DP; A-GPS; FM radio; microUSB 2.0, USB On-The-Go
- Data inputs: Accelerometer; Proximity sensor; Magnetometer
- Model: A33f, A33w, A33fw
- Other: Colors: Blue, White

The Oppo Neo 7 is the last phone in the Oppo Neo Series, before the series became known under different aliases, such as the Oppo A Series. The phone was available in two configurations: a 3G and a 4G model. Besides network connectivity differences, these models also had different chipsets. Oppo says the reflective back on the phone, which is made by a "special laminating process" is inspired by Chinese bronze mirrors. The phone is aimed at people who value the looks of a phone over the raw specs, since the price (₹9990) is higher than other phones with similar specs.

This phone was released later as Oppo A33 in November 2015 but with 146g of weight, Snapdragon 410 chipset, 2 GB of RAM and a less 2400 mAh battery.
