= Oppo Neo =

Phone created by Oppo

- Brand: Oppo
- Series: Oppo Neo Series
- Compatible networks: 2G bands: GSM 850 / 900 / 1800 / 1900; 3G bands: HSDPA 2100; HSPA
- Dimensions: 132x65.8x9.2 mm; 5.20x2.59x0.36 in
- Weight: 130 g (4.59 oz)
- Operating system: Android 4.2.1
- System-on-chip: MediaTek MT6572
- CPU: 2x1.3GHz ARM Cortex-A7
- GPU: ARM Mali-400 MP1, 1 core, 500MHz
- Memory: 512MB LPDDR2, 266MHz
- Storage: 4GB
- Removable storage: microSDHC
- Battery: Removable Li-Ion, 1900mAh
- Charging: microUSB 2.0
- Rear camera: 2592x1944 (5.04MP); Video: 720p at 30fps
- Front camera: 1600x1200 (1.92MP); Video: 800x480 at 30fps
- Display: Type: IPS LCD; Size: 4.5 inches, 57.6 cm^2; Resolution: 480x800, 207 ppi; Ratios: 5:3 aspect ratio, 66.4% StB ratio
- Sound: Loudspeaker: Yes; 3.5mm jack: Yes
- Media: Audio: AAC, eAAC+ / aacPlus v2 / HE-AAC v2, FLAC, M4A, MIDI, MP3, OGG, WAV; Video: 3GPP, AVI, Flash Video, H.263, H.264 / MPEG-4 Part 10 / AVC video, MKV, MP4, WMV
- Connectivity: Wi-Fi 802.11 b/g/n, Wi-Fi Direct, hotspot; Bluetooth 2.1, A2DP; A-GPS; FM radio; microUSB 2.0
- Data inputs: Accelerometer; Proximity sensor

The Oppo Neo is the first phone in Oppo's Neo series. The phone was sold in two colors: white and black, for a price of €160.

== Specification ==
=== Hardware ===
The Oppo Neo features a 4.5-inch IPS LCD (480 x 800 pixels) in a 130 g, 9.2 mm-thin body. It is powered by a dual-core 1.3 GHz CPU with 512 MB RAM and 4 GB internal storage, expandable via microSD. For optics, it has a 5 MP main camera and a 2 MP selfie camera. A removable 1900 mAh Li-ion battery powers the device.
