= Minimum resolvable contrast =

Minimum resolvable contrast (MRC) is a subjective measure of a visible spectrum sensor’s or camera's sensitivity and ability to resolve data. A snapshot image of a series of three bar targets of selected spatial frequencies and various contrast coatings captured by the unit under test (UUT) is used to determine the MRC of the UUT, i.e., the visible spectrum camera or sensor. A trained observer selects the smallest target resolvable at each contrast level. Typically, specialized computer software collects the inputted data of the observer and provides a graph of contrast vs. spatial frequency at a given luminance level. A first order polynomial is fitted to the data and an MRC curve of spatial frequency versus contrast is generated.

== See also ==
- Distortion
- Image resolution
- Integrating sphere
- Minimum resolvable temperature difference
- Optical resolution
- Signal-to-noise ratio
