= Oppo R7s =

Android smartphone model by OPPO

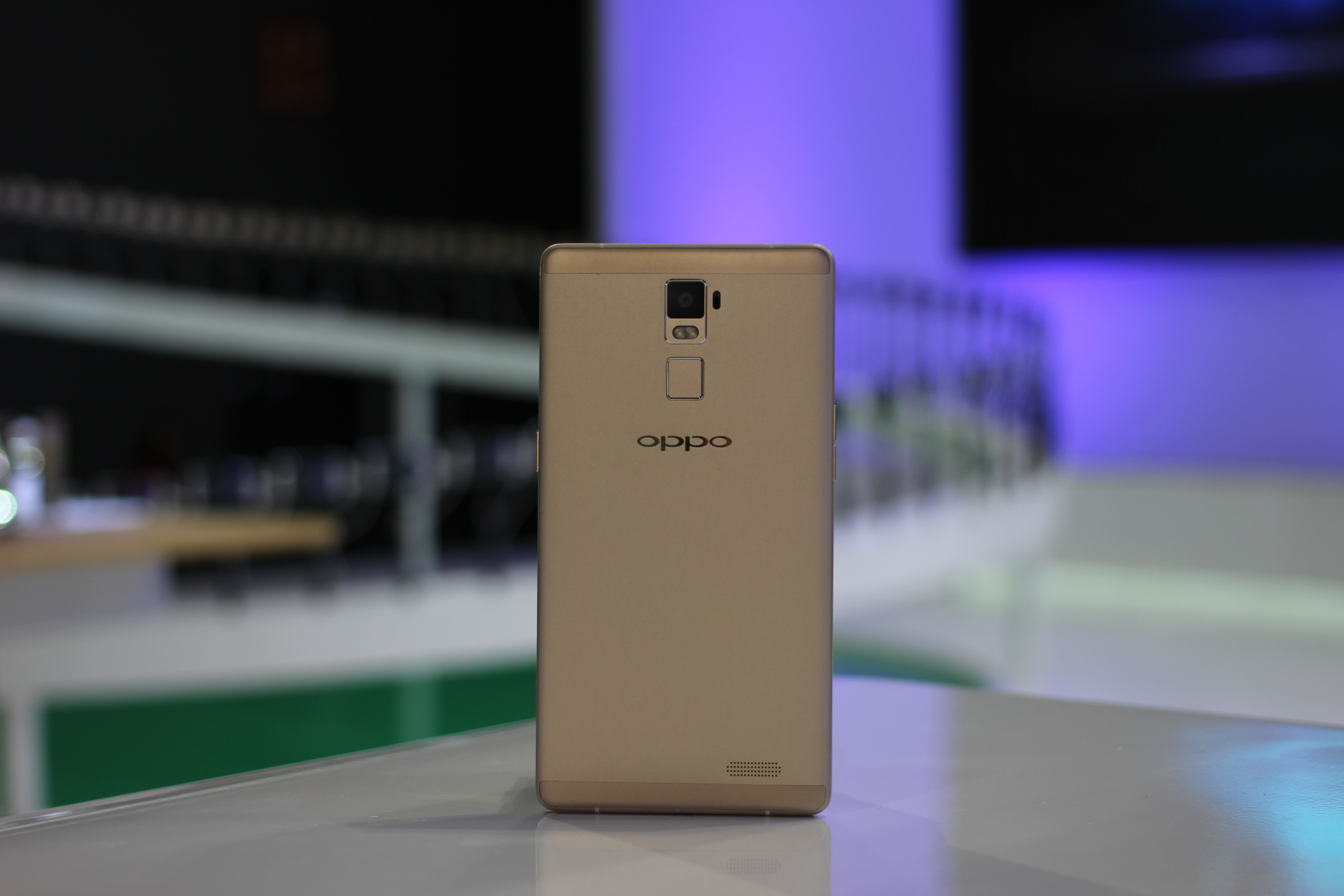
- OPPO R7s which has similar appearance with OPPO R7 Plus.
- Brand: Oppo
- Manufacturer: OPPO Electronics
- Type: Smartphone
- Series: Oppo R Series
- Predecessor: Oppo R7
- Successor: Oppo R9
- Compatible networks: List: Technology: GSM / HSPA / LTE; 2G bands: GSM 850 / 900 / 1800 / 1900 - SIM 1 & SIM 2; 3G bands: HSDPA 850 / 900 / 1900 / 2100 - Global, Taiwan, USA; 4G bands (LTE): 1, 3, 5, 7, 8, 20, 40 - Global 1, 3, 5, 7, 8, 28, 38, 39, 40, 41 - Taiwan 1, 2, 4, 7, 17 - USA; Speed: HSPA, LTE Cat4 150/50 Mbps
- Form factor: Slate
- Color: Golden
- Dimensions: 151.8 mm (5.98 in) H 75.4 mm (2.97 in) W 7.0 mm (0.28 in) D
- Weight: 155 g (5.5 oz)
- Operating system: Original & Current: Android 5.1.1 with ColorOS 2.1
- System-on-chip: Qualcomm Snapdragon 615 (28 nm TSMC 28LP)
- CPU: Octa-core (4x1.5 GHz Cortex-A53 & 4x1.0 GHz Cortex-A53)
- GPU: Adreno 405
- Modem: Snapdragon X5 LTE
- Memory: 4 GB RAM (LPDDR3)
- Storage: 32 GB (eMMC 4.5)
- Removable storage: microSDXC, expandable up to 128 GB
- SIM: Dual nano-SIM
- Battery: 3070 mAh lithium-polymer, non-removable
- Charging: 20W VOOC Flash Charging
- Rear camera: Single-Camera Setup; Samsung S5K3L8; 13 MP, f/2.2, 1/3.06", 1.12µm, PDAF; LED flash, panorama, HDR; 1080p@30fps
- Front camera: 8 MP, f/2.4, 1/4.0", 1.12µm, FF
- Display: 5.5 in (140 mm); 1080 x 1920 px resolution, 16:9 ratio (~401 ppi density); AMOLED, 60Hz; Corning Gorilla Glass 3
- Sound: Loudspeaker, 3.5 mm auxiliary (headphone jack)
- Connectivity: Wi-Fi 802.11 a/b/g/n/ac, Wi-Fi Direct, hotspot
- Data inputs: Multi-touch screen; Micro-USB 2.0, OTG; Accelerometer; Proximity sensor; Compass
- Water resistance: None
- Model: R7sf, R7sm, R7s
- Development status: Discontinued
- Made in: China
- Website: https://www.oppo.com/

The OPPO R7s is an Android-based smartphone manufactured by Oppo, released in October 2015. The OPPO R7 series features all-metal unibody, with a focus on its fit, finish, and the distinct arcs towards its display edges. The phone was developed as a successor to the OPPO R5s. However, the phone was discontinued with the release of more developed version like OPPO R15 and OPPO R17. The phone features an upgraded display, a larger battery capacity, and a revised design compared to its predecessor. Reception for the phone was mixed, while reviewers praised its design, display quality, and battery life, it was criticized for its lack of biometric security features, such as a fingerprint sensor.

== Evolution of OPPO R series ==
OPPO R series	Released date	Released with
R1s	April 2014	Android 4.3 (Jelly Bean)
R3	June 2014	Android 4.3 (Jelly Bean)
R5	December 2014	Android 4.4.4 (KitKat)
R7 and R7 Plus	May 2015	Android 4.4.2 (KitKat)
R7s	October 2015	Android 5.1.1 (Lollipop)
R9 and R9 Plus	March 2016	Android 5.1.1 (Lollipop)
R9s and R9s Plus	October 2016	Android 6.0.1 (Marshamallow)
R11 and R11 Plus	June 2017	Android 7.1.1 (Nougat)
R11s and R11s Plus	November 2017	Android 7.1.1 (Nougat)
R13 and R13 Plus	Unreleased	
R15 and R15 Pro	April 2018	Android 8.1 (Oreo)
R15x	October 2018	Android 8.1 (Oreo)
R17 and R17 Pro	October 2018	Android 8.1 (Oreo)

== Design ==
The OPPO R7s provide three visions of silver, gold, and rose gold.

The OPPO R7s feature a 5.5-inch 1080p AMOLED screen, a lightweight design, an ultra-narrow 2.2 mm frame, a fuselage thickness of 6.9 mm, a reoptimized side arc and a more delicate back touch, giving it an excellent grip. The appearance of the OPPO R7s has changed slightly, with OPPO's Logo, touch button added to the front and bottom of the phone to become a virtual key, while there are no physical keys on the front of the phone, front camera, receiver, and light sensor are all at the top. At the same time, the mobile phone adopts a three-stage all-metal fuselage design, with a rear camera in the upper left corner of the back and a flash below it.

The OPPO R7s has a 5.5 display and a screen resolution of Full HD (1080 × 1920 pixels) as it runs in Android 5.1.1 (Lollipop) operating system. The device is powered by Octa Core, 1.5 GHz, and 4 GB of Ram is paired with Cortex-A53 processor. OPPO R7s does not have a finger print system. The phone has an Adreno 405 GPU for graphical performance, which makes the games run smoothly. The phone has a storage of 32 GB with the option to expand up to 128 GB.

== Hardware ==
=== Battery life ===
The OPPO R7s comes with a 3070 mAh lithium battery that supports VOOC flash charging for 5 minutes and 2 hours of calls, while Samsung Galaxy A7 only has 2600 mAh battery in 2015. In addition, compared to iPhones, iPhone 7s comes with 2900 mAh, iPhone 8s comes with 2675 mAh and iPhone X comes with 2716 mAh. Unlike other companies, Apple never publish their battery capacity figures. Normally, they will release them later when tech enthusiasts get their hands on the devices.

Since OPPO launched Find7 in 2014, almost all of its main models have fully supported VOOC flash technology. OPPO R7s, as a major product of OPPO in the second half of 2015, can't miss the VOOC flash, because if let them recharge for 30 minutes. OPPO R7s can reach 75% electric quality with 20 W while iPhone XR only has 50% with 18 W adapter.

=== Camera ===
The OPPO R7s camera is combined with a front 8 million pixels and a rear 13 million pixels, which supports phase focusing and global flash system. In contrast to iPhone, all of them have a 7 million pixels because of the same basic specs for the front camera and 12 million pixels for the rear camera. The OPPO R7s uses a ‘Flash Shot’ technology, as the camera only needs 0.1 seconds to focus, which allows the phone to take a shot very quickly, comparing to the iPhone 6s, which is also similar. The OPPO R7s have a good all rounder shot, however there are still some areas that the phone's camera can improve. Tests have shown that the camera's dynamic range is ‘noisy’ and the focus is not always fast, which iPhone 6s performs better as well as Lumia 950XL and Samsung Galaxy S6 series. One of the flaws on OPPO R7s camera is that under low light conditions the speed of the shutter reduced significantly as very steady hands are needed to avoid blur image. Moving on to the front camera, its 8 MP with f/2.4 aperture, as the camera is able to offer a reasonably wide angle for small groups. Comparing to iPhone, the front camera is 5 MP to help and improve image quality, however, both rear and front cameras has HDR mode, filters, timer and flash. The video system on OPPO R7s can be set to 720p, with realistic and cool colors, comparing to iPhone which can capture 4k video at 30 frames per second.

== Software ==
OPPO R7s runs Color OS 2.1, which is the latest version of OPPO software, based on Android 5.1 lollipop. Anyone familiar with Color OS will know that the experience on OPPO R7s is very different from the usual Android experience. Of course, everything would operate with the same way. However, every re-designed elements are contributed a purpose. For example: when sliding between tabs in the setting menu, the text will slide out of the screen. This would depend on where the finger is on the screen. Also, Color OS provides other function, such as: setting for eye protection display. This can make the screen become the pink color, which is great for the users with sensitive eyes. There are also a lot of gestures, including adjust the volume by using two fingers and lock the screen by double-clicking the home button.

In addition, because OPPO R7s comes with a Samsung AMOLED display, it has a vibrant color display. In the black scene, OPPO R7s can be achieved without luminous characteristics, compared to the IPS screen will have a better performance. In terms of the system, the screen hardware is further combined, such as: theme, setting interface, system popover and other aspects of black tone processing, to ensure that the power consumption of the screen can be further reduced. Despite the official use of black style, the choice is really up to the consumers. Moreover, there are many details, among which it is worth explaining is the strengthening of localization features, including the addition of yellow function, which can quickly check the relevant number, including express, life, catering and so on. At the same time, the system also identifies harassing calls and malicious phone charges.

== Reviews ==
=== Advantages ===
One of the most features is OPPO R7s magnesium-aluminum alloy unibody construction. Similar to the other two phones named OPPO R7 and OPPO R7 plus, the OPPO R7s have a unibody design with full metal which feels solid in hand. Similar to R7 Plus, it lacks capacities navigation keys which allows for a more comfortable managing experience. Another best key features is for its design, especially dual-SIM dual-standby capability of OPPO R7s, which comes with a double edge: using the R7s either with a microSIM and a microSD or a microSIM and a nanoSIM. If you are switching from a device reliant on the nanoSIM — like say an iPhone 5 or 6, or a Samsung Galaxy S6 — you have this format, and when you throw this in the tray, you are actually slotting it into the section that handles both the microSD and the nanoSIM. Compared to iPhone 6s, the height and width of it is 138.3 mm and 67.1 mm respectively, while OPPO R7s is bigger than iPhone 6s at 151.8 mm and 75.4 mm. Also, display is also a feature for OPPO R7s. The resolution of it is 750×1334 pixels, while the resolution of OPPO R7s is 1080×1920 pixels, which provides full HD. And the pixel density of OPPO R7s is over 400 ppi, which is higher than iPhone 6s's at 326 ppi. Furthermore, OPPO R7s has memory card of microSD and its memory ram is 4 GB, which is twice than that of iPhone 6s's. Finally, OPPO R7s has great battery life compared with other phones, for example iPhone 6s, which has 1715 mAh. OPPO R7s includes a feature called VOOC (Voltage Open Loop Multi-step Constant-Current Charging) this allows the phone to charge from 1% to 100% in just 35 minutes.

=== Disadvantages ===
Oppo has made a fair amount of mid-range models designed to take the fight to its premium competitors, but the Oppo R7s feels like a mid-ranger sitting in the middle of a bunch of other mid-rangers. There's the Oppo R7 with similar hardware and a smaller screen, the Oppo R7 Plus with similar hardware and a bigger screen, and then there's this phone - the R7s - which kind of sits in between both. However, OPPO R7s still has some things should be improved. The phones does not have a finger print system, which weakens the security system. Also contrast with iPhone 6s, OPPO R7s is lack of NFC (Near Field Communication) when iPhone 6s has Apply Pay and FM radio were a major disappointment of the smart phone. Although the Oppo R7s can record high-resolution 1920 x 1080 movies, it is hard to find any evidence of the R7s featuring an HDMI port, which is convenient to watch HD videos on your shiny HDTV. Furthermore, sealed battery, microSD slot shared with second SIM has a negative side. The slot of the mobile phone card is a multi-function slot shared by SD card and SIM, the correct installation position of the Nano SIM card should be perpendicular to the position of Micro SIM, but the icon on the back of the phone is not obvious, and it is easy for the new users to install by mistakes. Lastly, the variants for OPPO R7s only has one type for customers which is 32 GB, however, compared to iPhone 6s, it has kinds of storages. This gives customers more choices.

== Limitations and comparison to other models ==
The OPPO R7s has 4 GB of RAM, its Geekbench 3 single core is only 696, comparing to Google Nexus 5X's 1188 and Apple iPhone 6S's 2540, which all have better performance. Firstly, for security reasons there is an increasing need for a finger print system to protect individual's privacy. Secondly, the operating system still needs to improve. The confusion being that shortcuts and home screen focus is lost in OPPO's Colour OS system, which meant that your programs are not shortcuts as you remove one, you will move the entire thing. Thirdly, there is also a bug called ‘misoperation prevention’ error, when an individual hold their phone from the top. Fourthly, although the phone has a dual SIM slot, however if one has a Nano SIM, this means that one would not get micro SD access. Most importantly, the camera system needs to improve on the phone, as the phone's camera starts to blur in low light and the quality of the images starts to fade. Also, OPPO's VOOC charger could be for charging up OPPO R7s, however the charger rejects to charge other phones such as Samsung, Sony and LG phones as it would be inconvenient to charge multiple device at once. Lastly, the phone's speaker is place at the bottom of the phone; this means that if one wants to hold the phone in landscape orientation to play a game or watch a video, the finger of the user might cover the sound, which is inconvenient.
