= Oppo Reno3 =

Smartphones manufactured by Oppo

Oppo Reno3 Oppo Reno3 5G
- Brand: Oppo
- Type: Smartphone
- Series: Reno
- First released: Reno3: March 17, 2020; 6 years ago Reno3 5G: December 26, 2019; 6 years ago
- Availability by region: Reno3; March 17, 2020; Initial launch May 2, 2020; Philippines; Reno 5G; December 26, 2019; China
- Predecessor: Oppo Reno2
- Successor: Oppo Reno4
- Related: Oppo Reno3 Pro; Oppo Find X2
- Compatible networks: Reno3; GSM / HSPA / LTE; Reno3 5G; GSM / CDMA / HSPA / EVDO / LTE / 5G
- Colors: Reno3; Midnight Black, Aurora Blue, Sky White; Reno3 5G; White, Black, Starry Night Blue, Sunrise
- Dimensions: 4G model: 160.2 × 73.3 × 7.9 mm 5G model: 160.3 × 74.3 × 8 mm
- Operating system: Initial: Android 10 with ColorOS 7 UI; Current: Android 12 with ColorOS 12.1 UI
- System-on-chip: Reno3: Mediatek MT6779 Helio P90 (12 nm); Reno3 5G: Mediatek Dimensity 1000L (7 nm)
- CPU: Octa-core; Reno3: 2x 2.2 GHz Cortex-A75 & 6x 2.0 GHz Cortex-A55; Reno3 5G: 2x 2.2 GHz Cortex-A77 & 6x 2.0 GHz Cortex A55
- GPU: Reno3: PowerVR GM9446; Reno3 5G: Mali-G77 MP9
- Memory: 8GB / 12GB (12GB support the 5G model only); UFS 2.1
- Storage: 128GB
- Removable storage: microSDXC (4G model only)
- SIM: Both models: Dual nanoSIM
- Battery: 4025 mAh Lithium-polymer battery
- Charging: Reno3: Fast charging up to 30W, USB Type-C 2.0; Fast charging up to 30W, USB Type-C 3.1
- Rear camera: Quad-Camera; Reno3 4G: 48MP 1/2.0" wide-angle (f/1.8, 26mm); 13MP 1/3.4" telephoto (f/2.4, 52mm); 8MP 1/4.0" ultrawide-angle (f/2.2, 13mm); 2MP B/W (f/2.4); Triple-Camera; Reno3 5G: 64MP 1/1.72" wide-angle (f/1.8, 26mm) with image stabilization 8MP 1/3.2" ultrawide-angle (f/2.2, 13mm); 2MP 1/5.0" B/W (f/2.4); Video recording supports 4K@30fps and 1080p@30/60fps for 4G model, while the 5G supports the same supportable resolutions + 120fps + OIS; with gyro-EIS
- Front camera: Wide-angle; Reno3 4G: 44 MP, f/2.4, 26mm (wide), 1/2.8"; Reno3 5G: 32 MP, f/2.0, 26mm (wide), 1/2.8"; Both models support HDR
- Display: 6.4-inch AMOLED; 430 nits (typical); 1080 × 2400 pixels; 20:9 ratio
- Sound: Mono speakers 3.5mm stereo audio jack
- Connectivity: Reno3: GPS, GLONASS, GALILEO, BDS; Reno3 5G: GPS (L1+L5), GLONASS, BDS, GALILEO, QZSS
- Made in: China

The Oppo Reno3 and Reno3 5G are mid-range Android smartphones developed and manufactured by OPPO Electronics. It was launched on March 17, 2020 for the 4G model and on December 26, 2019 for the 5G model in Hangzhou, China, along with the Reno3 Pro.

== Specifications ==
=== Design & Build ===
All models in the front are made of Corning Gorilla Glass 5 and has a glass texture at the back. The frame is made of aluminum. With dimensions at 160.2 × 73.3 × 7.9 mm for the 4G model and 160.3 × 74.3 × 8 mm for the 5G model respectively, both smartphones had their 6.4-inch AMOLED display with resolution at 1080 × 2400 pixels and a 20:9 aspect ratio.

The phone was available at multiple color options, but differs from the following models:

- Reno3: Midnight Black, Aurora Blue, Sky White (3 colors)
- Reno3 5G: White, Black, Starry Night Blue, Sunrise (4 colors)

=== Hardware ===
The Reno4 (4G model) is powered by the MediaTek Helio P90 chipset with an octa-core (layered with two 2.2 GHz Cortex-A75 cores and six 2.0 GHz Cortex-A55 cores) and PowerVR GM9446 GPU, while the 5G is powered by the Mediatek Dimensity 1000L chipset with a different octa-core layout (two 2.2 GHz Cortex-A77 cores and 2.0 GHz Cortex-A55 cores) and the Mali-G77 MP9 GPU. Both devices powered by a 4025 mAh li-po battery with fast charging support up to 30 watt VOOC 4.0, which takes about 20 minutes to reach 50% and 56 minutes to fully charge, according to the manufacture's claim.

Both models support 128GB of internal storage. The Reno3 support 8GB of RAM while the Reno3 5G support 8 ang 12GB of RAM.

=== Camera ===
Both smartphones received multiple camera setup with different layout from the models:

- The Reno3 4G has its quad-camera setup, which includes a 48MP 1/2.0" wide-angle (f/1.8, 26mm), a 13MP 1/3.4" telephoto lens (f/2.4, 52mm), an 8MP 1/4.0", ultrawide-angle (f/2.2, 13mm), and a 2MP B/W (f/2.4).
- The Reno3 5G has its triple-camera setup, which includes a 64MP 1/1.72" wide-angle (f/1.8, 26mm) with image stabilization, an 8MP 1/3.2" ultrawide-angle (f/2.2, 13mm), and a 2MP 1/5.0" B/W (f/2.4).

Both models support 4K resolution at 30fps. It also support standard 1080p HD resolution at 30, 60, or 120 fps (only for the 5G model, the 4G model still supports 30 or 60 fps). The Reno 4G received a 44MP wide-angle 1/2.8" lens with aperture of f/2.4, while the 5G model received a 32MP wide-angle lens with aperture of f/2.0 with the same lens size. Both of them supports HDR and 1080p video recording at 30 fps.

=== Software ===
The Reno3 and Reno3 5G were originally released with Android 10 with the ColorOS 7 User Interface system. It was updated to Android 12 with ColorOS 12.1 UI in May 2022 as the latest version for both devices.
