= Oppo R11 =

Android Smartphone from Oppo

Oppo R11 Oppo R11 Plus Oppo R11s Oppo R11s Plus
- Brand: Oppo
- Manufacturer: OPPO Electronics
- Type: Smartphone
- Series: Oppo R
- First released: R11: May 20, 2017; 9 years ago R11 Plus: June 9, 2017; 9 years ago R11s: October 27, 2017; 8 years ago R11s Plus: November 2, 2017; 8 years ago
- Availability by region: R11: List: June 10, 2017: China; June 23, 2017: Hong Kong; July 1, 2017: Taiwan Singapore; July 15, 2017: Thailand; July 28, 2017: Malaysia; August 7, 2017: Australia; August 16, 2017: Vietnam; August 28, 2017: New Zealand; R11 Plus: List: June 30, 2017: China; July 1, 2017: Taiwan; July 7, 2017: Hong Kong; R11s: List: November 10, 2017: China Malaysia; November 17, 2017: Thailand; November 24, 2017: Hong Kong; December 1, 2017: Taiwan Vietnam; December 2, 2017: Singapore; February 5, 2018: Australia; February 9, 2018: Japan; R11s Plus: List: November 24, 2017: China; December 8, 2017: Hong Kong; December 9, 2017: Singapore; December 22, 2017: Taiwan; January 2, 2018: Malaysia; January 12, 2018: Thailand; February 5, 2018: Australia
- Predecessor: Oppo R9; Oppo R9 Plus; Oppo R9s; Oppo R9s Plus
- Successor: Oppo R15; Oppo R15 Pro
- Compatible networks: List: Technology: GSM / CDMA / HSPA / EVDO / LTE; 2G bands: GSM 850 / 900 / 1800 / 1900 - SIM 1 & SIM 2; 3G bands: HSDPA 850 / 900 / 1700(AWS) / 1900 / 2100; CDMA2000 1xEV-DO & TD-SCDMA; 4G bands (LTE): R11: 1, 2, 3, 4, 5, 8, 38, 39, 40, 41 - Dual SIM; 1, 3, 4, 5, 7, 8, 20, 28, 38, 39, 40, 41 - Single SIM; R11 Plus: 1, 2, 3, 4, 5, 8, 38, 39, 40, 41; R11s: 1, 2, 3, 4, 5, 8, 34, 38, 39, 40, 41 - R11s; 1, 2, 3, 4, 5, 7, 8, 34, 38, 39, 40, 41 - R11st; R11s Plus: 1, 2, 3, 4, 5, 8, 34, 38, 39, 40, 41 - R11s Plus; 1, 2, 3, 4, 5, 7, 8, 12, 17, 34, 38, 39, 40, 41 - R11s Plust; Speed: HSPA 42.2/5.76 Mbps, LTE (2CA) Cat6 300/50 Mbps
- Form factor: Slate
- Colors: R11: Black, Gold, Rose Gold, Red; R11 Plus: Black, Gold, Rose Gold; R11s: Red, Black, Champagne; R11s Plus: Black, Champagne
- Dimensions: R11: 154.5 mm (6.08 in) H 74.8 mm (2.94 in) W 6.8 mm (0.27 in) D R11 Plus: 165.8 mm (6.53 in) H 81.5 mm (3.21 in) W 7.8 mm (0.31 in) D R11s: 155.1 mm (6.11 in) H 75.5 mm (2.97 in) W 7.1 mm (0.28 in) D R11s Plus: 164.8 mm (6.49 in) H 80.2 mm (3.16 in) W 7.3 mm (0.29 in) D
- Weight: R11: 150 g (5.3 oz); R11 Plus: 188 g (6.6 oz); R11s: 153 g (5.4 oz); R11s Plus: 182 g (6.4 oz)
- Operating system: R11/R11 Plus: Original: Android 7.1.1 with ColorOS 3.1; Current: Android 7.1.1 with ColorOS 3.2 (For CPH1707 (R11), Global) Android 9 with ColorOS 6 (For OPPO R11, OPPO R11t, OPPO R11 Plus, OPPO R11 Plusk, OPPO R11 Pluskt, China); R11s/R11s Plus: Original: Android 7.1.1 with ColorOS 3.2; Current: Android 7.1.1 with ColorOS 3.2 (For CPH1719 (R11s), CPH1721 (R11s Plus), Global) Android 9 with ColorOS 6 (For OPPO R11s, OPPO R11st, OPPO R11s Plus, OPPO R11s Plust, China)
- System-on-chip: Qualcomm Snapdragon 660 (14 nm Samsung 14LPP)
- CPU: Octa-core (4x2.2 GHz Kryo 260 Gold & 4x1.8 GHz Kryo 260 Silver)
- GPU: Adreno 512
- Modem: Snapdragon X12 LTE
- Memory: R11: 4/6 GB; R11s: 4 GB; R11 Plus/R11s Plus: 6 GB
- Storage: R11: 64/128 GB; R11 Plus/R11s/R11s Plus: 64 GB
- Removable storage: R11/R11 Plus: microSDXC, expandable up to 128 GB; R11s/R11s Plus: microSDXC, expandable up to 256 GB
- SIM: R11: nano-SIM; Dual nano-SIM; R11 Plus/R11s/R11s Plus: Dual nano-SIM
- Battery: R11: 3000 mAh lithium-polymer, non-removable R11s: 3200 mAh lithium-polymer non-removable R11 Plus/R11s Plus: 4000 mAh lithium-polymer, non-removable
- Charging: 20W VOOC Flash Charge
- Rear camera: Dual-Camera Setup; R11/R11 Plus: Primary: Sony IMX 398; 16 MP, f/1.7, 1/2.8", 1.12μm, PDAF; Telephoto: Sony IMX 350; 20 MP, f/2.6, 1/2.78", 1.0μm, AF; R11s/R11s Plus: Primary: Sony IMX 398; 16 MP, f/1.7, 1/2.8", 1.12μm, PDAF; Secondary: Sony IMX 376k; 20 MP, f/1.7, 1/2.78", 1.0μm, AF; Features: All: LED flash, HDR, panorama; Video: All: 4K@30 fps, 1080p@30 fps
- Front camera: Sony IMX 376; 20 MP, f/2.0, (wide), 1/2.78", 1.0μm; Video: All: 1080p@30 fps
- Display: R11: 5.50 in (140 mm); 1080 x 1920 px resolution, 16:9 ratio (~401 ppi density); AMOLED, 60 Hz; Corning Gorilla Glass 5 R11 Plus: 6.00 in (152 mm); 1080 x 1920 px resolution, 16:9 ratio (~368 ppi density); AMOLED, 60 Hz; Corning Gorilla Glass 5 R11s: 6.01 in (153 mm); 1080 x 2160 px resolution, 18:9 ratio (~401 ppi density); AMOLED, 60 Hz; Corning Gorilla Glass 5 R11s Plus: 6.43 in (163 mm); 1080 x 2160 px resolution, 18:9 ratio (~376 ppi density); AMOLED, 60 Hz; Corning Gorilla Glass 5
- Sound: Loudspeaker, 3.5 mm auxiliary (headphone jack)
- Connectivity: List: Wi-Fi :802.11 b/g/n (2,4 GHz); Hotspot (Wi-Fi); GPS; Bluetooth 4.0; USB On-The-Go
- Water resistance: None
- Model: R11: CPH1707, OPPO R11, OPPO R11t; R11 Plus: OPPO R11 Plus, OPPO R11 Plusk, OPPO R11 Pluskt; R11s: CPH1719, OPPO R11s, OPPO R11st; R11s Plus: CPH1721, OPPO R11s Plus, OPPO R11s Plust
- Development status: Discontinued
- Other: Light sensor, Distance sensor, G-sensor, E-compass

The Oppo R11 is a phablet smartphone based on Android 7.1, which was unveiled on 10 June 2017. The model has a front camera of 20 MP and a dual rear primary camera that has a 20 MP telephoto lens and a 16 MP wide-angle lens.

== Specifications ==
Oppo R11 contains a Qualcomm MSM8956 Plus Snapdragon 660 octa-core processor with 3 or 4GB of RAM and 64 or 128GB of expandable storage, and provides of a 6-inch, 1080p IPS LCD capacitive touchscreen display. The model is conceived with Oppo Electronics' own operating system, ColorOS 3.1.

Oppo R11 runs on Android 7.1 and is powered by 2900mAh non-removable battery. The phone has connectivity options that include Wi-Fi and GPS. It also has sensors which include an accelerometer and proximity sensor

=== Photography ===
Oppo R11 comprises a front camera of 20 MP and a dual rear primary camera that offers portrait mode. The rear camera consists of a 20 MP telephoto lens and a 16 MP wide angle lens.

=== VOOC Flash Charging ===
Like all other flagships, the OPPO R11 is equipped with the VOOC Flash Charging technology.

== Limited Editions ==
=== TFBoys Limited Edition ===
Oppo R11 TFBoys Limited Edition is divided into three versions, Oppo R11 Karry Wang Limited Edition, Oppo R11 Roy Way Limited Edition and Oppo R11 Jackson Yi Limited Edition.

This edition is in black only and the exterior of each model is embellished with TFBoys triangle logo along with the usual Oppo logo. The TFBoys Limited Edition contains respective signatures of the three members which are carved on the back.

The phone has an exclusive interface which follows the colour theme of each member, Karry Wang in blue, Roy Way in green and Jackson Yi in red. Each model to this edition is included of an exclusive built-in video of TFBoys.

=== FC Barcelona Limited Edition ===
Oppo R11 Barcelona Limited Edition was released in Shanghai on August 8, 2017. Exterior to this limited edition contains an embedded 18K gold plated badge at the back, built-in FC Barcelona wallpapers and a protection casing that contains signature of the club's members.

=== New Year Anniversary Edition ===
Oppo R11s New Year Anniversary Edition was released in Shanghai, China on December 25th, 2017. Exterior to this limited edition contains an vibrant red color symbolizes for a "Good luck and Fortune", embedded 18K gold plated "Year of the Dog" zodiac badge at the back.

== R11s ==
R11s is an improved version of R11. The R11s has a double f / 1.7 large aperture which can automatically identify the lighting conditions. The R11s was available in Singapore from 2 December 2017 and in Australia from 5 February 2018.
