= Oppo Reno9 =

Android smartphone line

Oppo Reno9 Oppo Reno9 Pro Oppo Reno9 Pro+
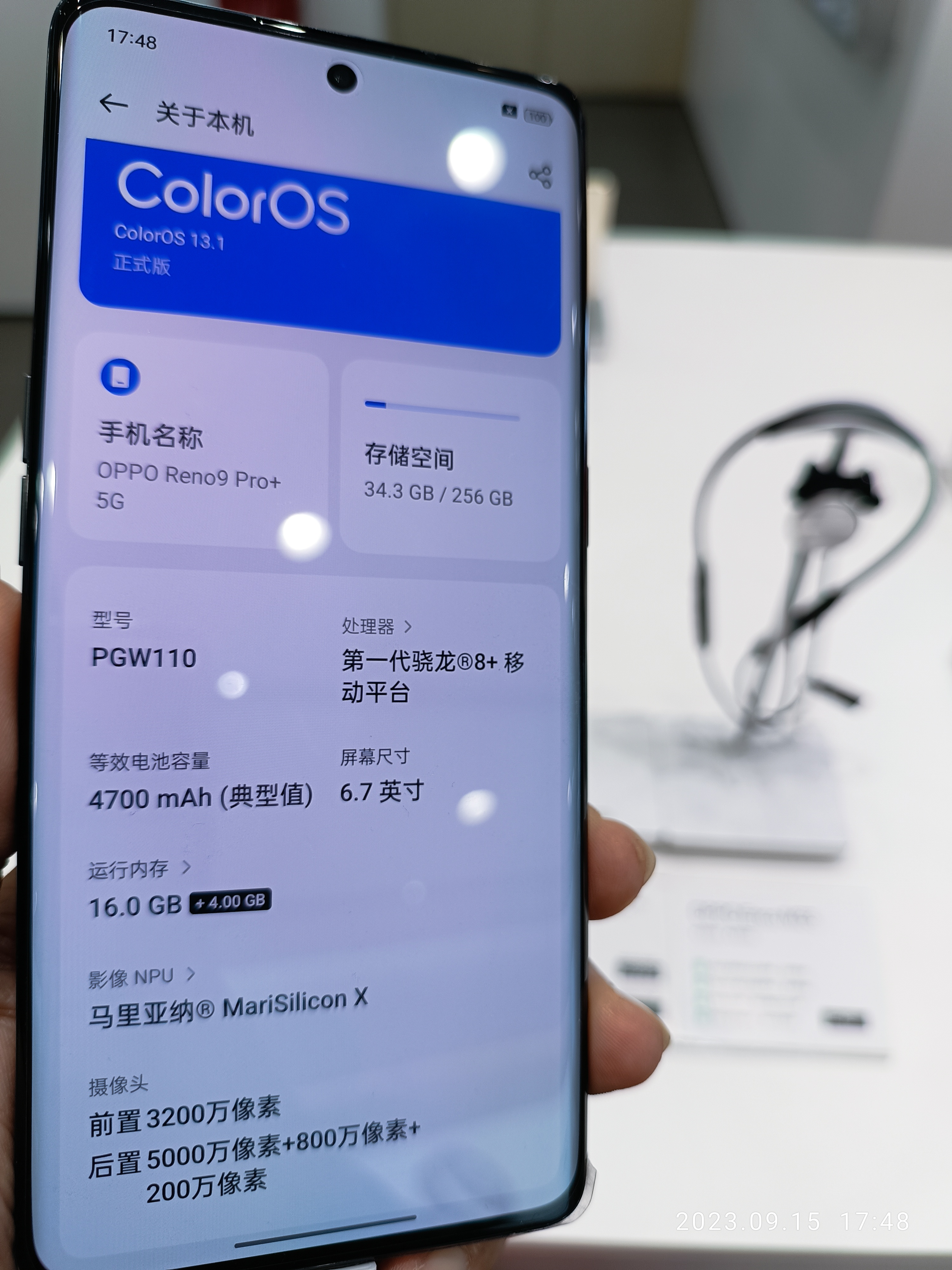
- Front of the Oppo Reno9 Pro+
- Manufacturer: OPPO
- Type: Phablet
- Series: Reno
- First released: November 24, 2022; 3 years ago
- Availability by region: China
- Predecessor: Oppo Reno8 5G
- Successor: Oppo Reno10
- Compatible networks: GSM, 3G, 4G (LTE), 5G
- Form factor: Slate
- Colors: Reno9: Dark Moonlight, Tipsy, Tomorrow Gold, All Things Red; Reno9 Pro: Dark Moonlight, Tipsy, Tomorrow Gold; Reno9 Pro+: Dark Moonlight, Greenish-Blue Sea, Tomorrow Gold
- Dimensions: Reno9/Pro: 162 × 74.2 × 7.19 mm Reno9 Pro+: 161.5 × 73.6 × 7.99 mm
- Weight: Reno9/Pro: 174 g Reno9 Pro+: 192 g
- Operating system: Initial: Android 13 + ColorOS 13; Current: Android 15 + ColorOS 15
- System-on-chip: Reno9: Qualcomm SM7325 Snapdragon 778G 5G (6 nm); Reno9 Pro: MediaTek Dimensity 8100-MAX (5 nm); Reno9 Pro+: Qualcomm SM8475 Snapdragon 8+ Gen 1 (4 nm)
- CPU: Reno9: Octa-core (1×2.4 GHz Cortex-A78 & 3×2.2 GHz Cortex-A78 & 4×1.9 GHz Cortex-A55); Reno9 Pro: Octa-core (4×2.85 GHz Cortex-A78 & 4×2 GHz Cortex-A55); Reno9 Pro+: Octa-core (1×3 GHz Cortex-X2 & 3×2.75 GHz Cortex-A710 & 4×2 GHz Cortex-A510)
- GPU: Reno9: Adreno 642L; Reno9 Pro: Mali-G610 MC6; Reno9 Pro+: Adreno 730
- Memory: Reno9: 8/12 GB LPDDR4X (8/256 GB and 12/256 GB) or LPDDR5 (12/512 GB); Reno9 Pro/Pro+: 16 GB LPDDR5
- Storage: Reno9: 256 GB UFS 2.2, 512 GB UFS 3.1; Reno9 Pro/Pro+: 512 GB UFS 3.1
- SIM: Dual SIM (Nano-SIM)
- Battery: All models: Non-removable Li-Po; Reno9/Pro: 4500 mAh; Reno9 Pro+: 4700 mAh
- Charging: Reno9: 67 W fast charging, Quick Charge 2.0; Reno9 Pro: 67 W fast charging Reno9 Pro+: 80 W fast charging, Quick Charge 3.0; All models: SUPERVOOC, Power Delivery, Reverse charging
- Rear camera: Reno9: 64 MP, f/1.7, 26 mm (wide), PDAF + 2 MP, f/2.4 (depth sensor); Reno9 Pro: 50 MP Sony IMX766, f/1.8, 26 mm (wide), 1/1.56", 1 µm, multi-directional PDAF + 8 MP, f/2.2, 112˚ (ultrawide), 1/4", 1.12 µm Reno9 Pro+: 50 MP Sony IMX766, f/1.8, 26 mm (wide), 1/1.56", 1 µm, multi-directional PDAF, OIS + 8 MP, f/2.2, 120˚ (ultrawide), 1/4", 1.12 µm + 2 MP, f/2.4 (depth sensor); LED flash, HDR, panorama Video: Reno9/Pro: 4K@30fps, 1080p@30/60/120fps, gyro-EIS, HDR (Reno9 Pro); Reno9 Pro+: 4K@30/60fps, 1080p@30/60/120/240fps, gyro-EIS, OIS, HDR
- Front camera: 32 MP Sony IMX709, f/2.4, 22 mm (wide), 1/2.74", 0.8 µm, AF; HDR, panorama Video: 1080p@30fps, gyro-EIS
- Display: AMOLED, 120 Hz, 6.7", 2412 × 1080 (FHD+), 20:9, 394 ppi, HDR10+
- Sound: Reno9/Pro: Mono; Reno9 Pro+: Stereo
- Connectivity: USB-C 2.0; Bluetooth: (A2DP, LE, aptX HD): Reno9/Pro+: 5.2; Reno9 Pro: 5.3; NFC, IR blaster, Wi-Fi 802.11 a/b/g/n/ac/6 (dual-band, Wi-Fi Direct); Satellite navigation: Reno9/Pro: GPS (L1; A-GPS), GLONASS (L1), BeiDou (B1l), Galileo (E1), QZSS (L1); Reno9 Pro+: GPS (L1 + L5; A-GPS), GLONASS (L1), BeiDou (B1l + B2a + Bc), Galileo (E1 + E5a), QZSS (L1 + L5)
- Data inputs: Under-display fingerprint scanner (optical), proximity sensor, accelerometer, gyroscope, compass, color temperature sensor, MariSilicon X NPU (Reno9 Pro/Pro+)
- Model: Reno9: PHM110; Reno9 Pro: PGX110; Reno9 Pro+: PGW110
- Codename: Reno9: lantian Reno9 Pro: linhai Reno9 Pro+: lvzhou
- Website: Official website of Oppo Reno9 Pro and Oppo Reno9 (in Chinese); Official website of Oppo Reno9 Pro+ (in Chinese)

The Oppo Reno9 is a line of Android-based smartphones developed by OPPO as part of its Reno series. The lineup consists of the standard Oppo Reno9, Reno9 Pro, and Reno9 Pro+, which were unveiled on November 24, 2022.

The Oppo Reno9 and Reno9 Pro mainly differ in their processors and cameras, while sharing the same physical body design.

== Design ==
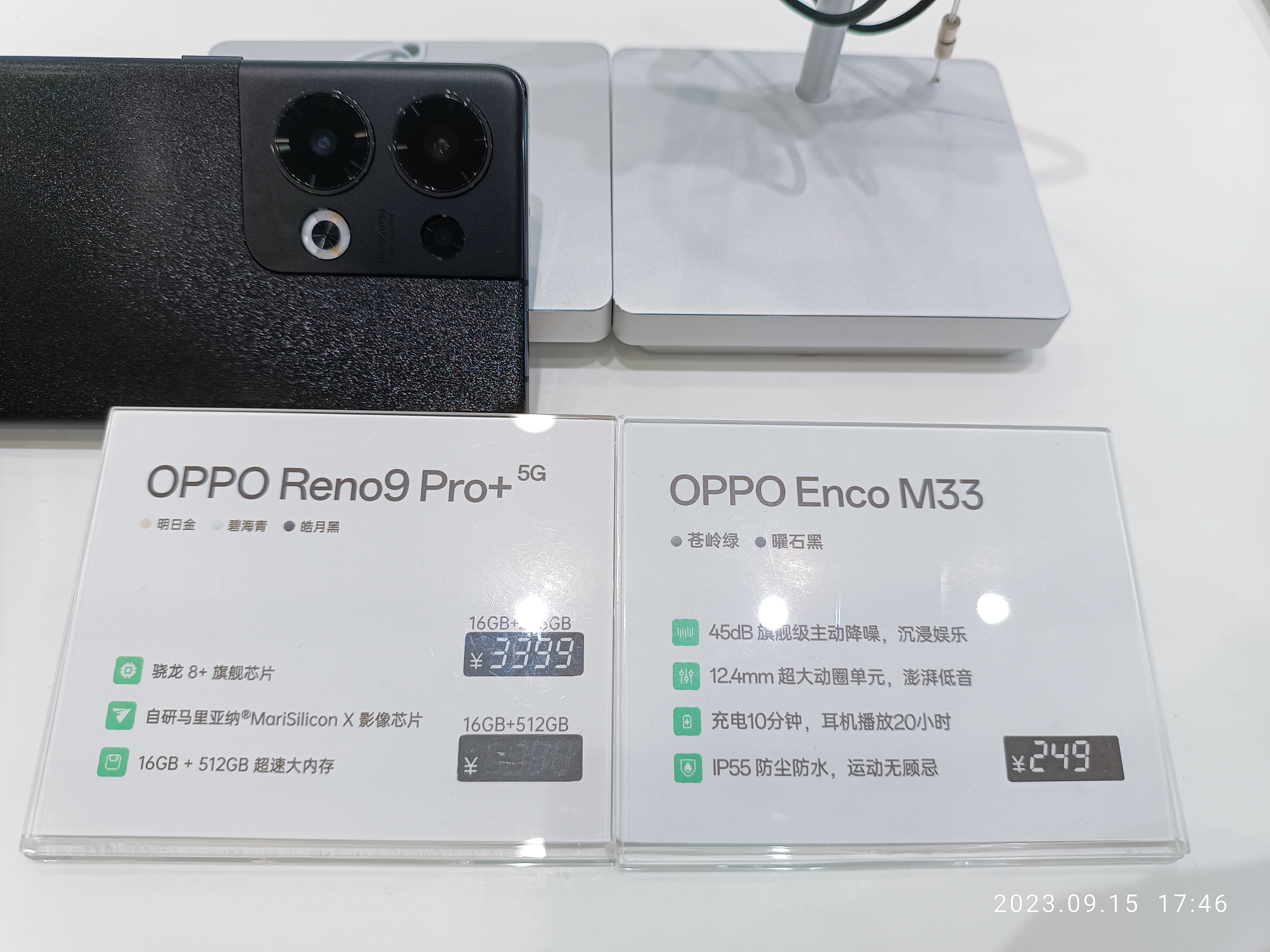
Camera island of the Oppo Reno9 Pro+

The display of all three models is protected by Asahi Glass AGC DT-Star2. The Reno9 and Reno9 Pro utilize plastic for both the back panel and the frame, while the Reno9 Pro+ features a premium glass back panel combined with an aluminum frame.

The design of the rear panel is reminiscent of the Oppo Reno8 series, but the Reno9 and Reno9 Pro replace the raised camera bump with a flush, glossy region. On the Reno9 Pro+, the camera module is a distinct, separate metal island, similar to the camera housing on the Samsung Galaxy S21 Ultra. Additionally, all models in the Reno9 lineup feature dual-curved edge displays.

The bottom of the devices houses a USB-C port, the main speaker, a microphone, and a dual Nano-SIM tray. The top edge features a secondary microphone, an infrared transmitter, and—exclusively on the Reno9 Pro+—a secondary speaker grille to enable stereo sound. The volume buttons are located on the left side, while the power button (featuring OPPO's signature green accent stripe) is on the right.

The smartphones are available in the following color options:

Reno9		Reno9 Pro		Reno9 Pro+	
Color	Name	Color	Name	Color	Name
	Dark Moonlight		Dark Moonlight		Dark Moonlight
	Tipsy		Tipsy		Greenish-Blue Sea
	Tomorrow Gold		Tomorrow Gold		Tomorrow Gold
	All Things Red				

== Specifications ==
=== Hardware ===
The standard Reno9 is powered by the same processor as the Chinese Oppo Reno7 5G—the Qualcomm Snapdragon 778G with an Adreno 642L GPU. The Reno9 Pro features the MediaTek Dimensity 8100-MAX with a Mali-G610 MC6 GPU, similar to the predecessor Reno8 Pro+. The top-tier Reno9 Pro+ is equipped with the flagship Qualcomm Snapdragon 8+ Gen 1 paired with an Adreno 730 GPU. Additionally, both Pro models integrate OPPO's proprietary MariSilicon X neural processing unit (NPU) dedicated to specialized image processing.

=== Battery and charging ===
The Reno9 and Reno9 Pro are equipped with a 4500 mAh battery supporting 67 W SUPERVOOC fast charging, while the Reno9 Pro+ features a larger 4700 mAh battery with 80 W SUPERVOOC fast charging support. All models support standard USB Power Delivery and reverse wired charging.

=== Camera ===
The Reno9 features a dual rear camera system consisting of a 64 MP primary wide-angle lens with an aperture of f/1.7 and PDAF, alongside a 2 MP depth sensor with a f/2.4 aperture. Video recording is supported up to 4K at 30 fps.

The Reno9 Pro features a dual rear setup with a 50 MP Sony IMX766 wide-angle sensor, having a f/1.8 aperture and multi-directional PDAF, alongside an 8 MP ultra-wide-angle lens with a f/2.2 aperture and a 112° field of view. Video recording is supported up to 4K at 30 fps.

The Reno9 Pro+ is equipped with a triple rear camera system: a 50 MP Sony IMX766 primary wide-angle lens with a f/1.8 aperture, multi-directional PDAF, and optical image stabilization (OIS); an 8 MP ultra-wide lens with a f/2.2 aperture and a 120° field of view; and a 2 MP depth sensor with a f/2.4 aperture. Video recording is supported up to 4K at 30/60 fps.

All models are equipped with a 32 MP Sony IMX709 front-facing camera featuring a f/2.4 aperture, autofocus, and 1080p video recording at 30 fps.

=== Display ===
The devices are equipped with a 6.7-inch AMOLED display featuring a FHD+ resolution of 2412 × 1080, a pixel density of 394 ppi, a 20:9 aspect ratio, a 120 Hz refresh rate, and HDR10+ support. The display features a centered punch-hole cutout for the front camera and houses an integrated optical under-display fingerprint sensor.

=== Audio ===
The Oppo Reno9 Pro+ features dual stereo speakers located on the top and bottom frames. The standard Reno9 and Reno9 Pro only feature a single mono loudspeaker.

=== Storage and memory ===
The Oppo Reno9 was sold in 8/256 GB, 12/256 GB, and 12/512 GB configurations. The Reno9 Pro and Reno9 Pro+ were available in 16/256 GB and 16/512 GB models.

The Reno9 uses LPDDR4X RAM for its 8/256 GB and 12/256 GB variants, and faster LPDDR5 RAM for its 12/512 GB variant. The Reno9 Pro and Reno9 Pro+ exclusively feature LPDDR5 RAM. In terms of storage technology, the 256 GB configurations of the Reno9 utilize UFS 2.2, while its 512 GB variant, the Reno9 Pro, and the Reno9 Pro+ utilize faster UFS 3.1 storage.

=== Software ===
The smartphones were launched with ColorOS 13 based on Android 13 and were later updated to ColorOS 15 based on Android 15.

== See also ==
- Oppo Reno
- Oppo Reno8 5G
- Oppo Reno10
