= Oppo Reno14 =

2025 Chinese smartphone line

Oppo Reno14 Oppo Reno14 Pro Oppo Reno14 F (Also known as Oppo Reno14 FS)
- Brand: Oppo
- Manufacturer: OPPO Electronics
- Type: Smartphone
- Series: OPPO Reno series
- First released: Reno14 / Reno14 Pro: May 15, 2025; 17 months ago Reno14 F: June 25, 2025; 16 months ago Reno14 FS: September 4, 2025; 14 months ago
- Availability by region: Reno14: List: May 23, 2025: China; June 27, 2025: Singapore; July 1, 2025: Malaysia; July 3, 2025: India; July 17, 2025: Japan; July 31, 2025: United Arab Emirates; August 8, 2025: Philippines; Reno14 Pro: List: May 23, 2025: China; June 27, 2025: Singapore; July 1, 2025: Malaysia; July 3, 2025: India Thailand; July 16, 2025: Indonesia; July 31, 2025: United Arab Emirates; August 8, 2025: Philippines; Reno14 F: List: June 27, 2025: Singapore; July 16, 2025: Taiwan Indonesia; July 31, 2025: United Arab Emirates; August 8, 2025: Philippines; Reno14 FS: List: September 4, 2025: Luxembourg Poland Netherlands; September 11, 2025: Spain France
- Predecessor: Oppo Reno13
- Successor: Oppo Reno15
- Compatible networks: List: Technology: GSM / CDMA / HSPA / LTE / 5G; 2G bands: Reno14 / Reno14 Pro: GSM 850 / 900 / 1800 / 1900; CDMA 800; Reno14 F / Reno14 FS: GSM 850 / 900 / 1800 / 1900; 3G bands: Reno 14: HSDPA 800 / 850 / 900 / 1700(AWS) / 1900 / 2100 - International; HSDPA 850 / 900 / 2100 - China; Reno14 Pro: HSDPA 800 / 850 / 900 / 1700(AWS) / 1900 / 2100 - International; HSDPA 850 / 1700(AWS) / 2100 - China; Reno14 F / Reno14 FS: HSDPA 800 / 850 / 900 / 1700(AWS) / 1900 / 2100 - version 1; HSDPA 850 / 900 / 2100 - version 2; HSDPA 900 / 2100 - version 3; 4G bands (LTE): Reno14: 1, 2, 3, 4, 5, 7, 8, 12, 13, 17, 18, 19, 20, 26, 28, 32, 38, 39, 40, 41, 66 - International; 1, 3, 5, 8, 28, 34, 38, 39, 40, 41, 42, 48 - China; Reno14 Pro: 1, 2, 3, 4, 5, 7, 8, 12, 13, 17, 18, 19, 20, 26, 28, 34, 38, 39, 40, 41, 42, 48, 66 - International; 1, 3, 4, 5, 8, 18, 19, 26, 28, 34, 38, 39, 40, 41, 42, 48, 66 - China; Reno14 F / Reno14 FS: 1, 2, 3, 4, 5, 7, 8, 12, 17, 18, 19, 20, 26, 28, 38, 39, 40, 41, 42, 48, 66 - version 1; 1, 3, 5, 7, 8, 20, 28, 38, 40, 41, 42 - version 2; 1, 3, 5, 8, 40 - version 3; 5G bands: Reno14: 1, 2, 3, 5, 7, 8, 12, 20, 26, 28, 38, 40, 41, 66, 77, 78 SA/NSA - International; 1, 5, 8, 28, 41, 48, 77, 78, 79 SA/NSA - China; Reno14 Pro: 1, 2, 3, 5, 7, 8, 12, 20, 26, 28, 38, 40, 41, 48, 66, 77, 78 SA/NSA - International; 1, 3, 5, 8, 28, 41, 48, 66, 77, 78, 79 SA/NSA - China; Reno14 F / Reno14 FS: 1, 2, 3, 5, 7, 8, 12, 20, 26, 28, 38, 40, 41, 66, 71, 77, 78 SA/NSA - version 1; 1, 3, 5, 7, 8, 20, 28, 38, 40, 41, 71, 77, 78 SA/NSA - version 2; 1, 3, 5, 8, 40 SA/NSA - version 3; Speed: HSPA, LTE, 5G
- Form factor: Slate
- Colors: Reno14: Tranquil Green (Forest Green), Brilliant White (Pearl White), Black, Green; Reno14 Pro: Titanium Gray, Brilliant White (Opal White), Purple; Reno14 F / Reno14 FS: Glossy Pink, Luminous Green, Opal Blue
- Dimensions: Reno14: 157.90 mm (6.217 in) H 74.73 mm (2.942 in) W 7.42 mm (0.292 in) D Reno14 Pro: 163.35 mm (6.431 in) H 76.98 mm (3.031 in) W 7.48 mm (0.294 in) (Titanium Gray); 7.58 mm (0.298 in) (Opal White) D Reno14 F / Reno14 FS: 158.12 mm (6.225 in) H 74.97 mm (2.952 in) W 7.74 mm (0.305 in) (Luminous Green); 7.78 mm (0.306 in) (Opal Blue) D
- Weight: Reno14: 187 g (6.6 oz); Reno14 Pro: 201 g (7.1 oz); Reno14 F / Reno14 FS: 180 g (6.3 oz)
- Operating system: Original: Android 15 with ColorOS 15.0.2; Current: Android 16 with ColorOS 16.0.5 (Reno14 F / Reno14 FS); ColorOS 16.0.10 (Reno14 / Reno14 Pro)
- System-on-chip: Reno14: MediaTek Dimensity 8350 (4 nm); Reno14 Pro: MediaTek Dimensity 8450 (4 nm); Reno14 F / Reno14 FS: Qualcomm SM6450 Snapdragon 6 Gen 1 (4 nm)
- CPU: Reno14: Octa-core (1x3.35 GHz Cortex-A715 & 3x3.20 GHz Cortex-A715 & 4x2.20 GHz Cortex-A510); Reno14 Pro: Octa-core (1x3.25 GHz Cortex-A725 & 3x3.0 GHz Cortex-A725 & 4x2.1 GHz Cortex-A725); Reno14 F / Reno14 FS: Octa-core (4x2.2 GHz Cortex-A78 & 4x1.8 GHz Cortex-A55)
- GPU: Reno14: Mali-G615 MC6 (1400 MHz); Reno14 Pro: Mali-G720 MC7 (1300 MHz); Reno14 F / Reno14 FS: Adreno 710 (676 MHz)
- Memory: Reno14: 8 / 12 / 16 GB RAM (LPDDR5X); Reno14 Pro: 12 / 16 GB RAM (LPDDR5X); Reno14 F / Reno14 FS: 8 / 12 GB RAM (LPDDR4X)
- Storage: Reno14 / Reno14 Pro: 256 / 512 GB / 1 TB (UFS 3.1); Reno14 F / Reno14 FS: 256 / 512 GB (UFS 3.1)
- Removable storage: Reno14 / Reno14 Pro: N/A; Reno14 F / Reno14 FS: microSDXC, expandable up to 2 TB
- SIM: Reno14 / Reno14 Pro: nano-SIM + nano-SIM + eSIM (max 2 at a time); nano-SIM + nano-SIM; Reno14 F / Reno14 FS: nano-SIM + nano-SIM; nano-SIM + eSIM
- Battery: Reno14 / Reno14 F / Reno14 FS: 6000 mAh; Reno14 Pro: 6200 mAh
- Charging: Reno14: 80W SuperVOOC (11V / 7.3A); 33W PPS (11V / 3A); 13.5W PD (9V / 1.5A); Reverse wired; Reno14 Pro: 80W SuperVOOC (11V / 7.3A); 33W UFCS (11V / 3A); 33W PPS (11V / 3A); 13.5W PD (9V / 1.5A); Wireless: 50W AirVOOC; Reverse wired; Reno14 F / Reno14 FS: 45W SuperVOOC (11V / 4.1A); 45W PPS; 13.5W PD2 (9V / 1.5A); 13.5W QC2.0 (9V / 1.5A); Reverse wired
- Rear camera: Triple-Camera Setup; Reno14: Primary: Sony IMX 882; 50 MP (5P lens), f/1.8, 26mm, FoV 79°, 1/1.95", 0.8µm, 2-axis PDAF, OIS; Telephoto: 50 MP (4P lens), f/2.8, 80mm, FoV 30°, 1/2.76", 0.64µm, PDAF, 2-axis OIS, 3.5x optical zoom; Ultrawide: 8 MP (5P lens), f/2.2, 15mm, FoV 116°, 1/4.0", 1.12µm, AF; Reno14 Pro: Primary: 50 MP (6P lens), f/1.8, 24mm, FoV 85°, 1/1.55", 1.0µm, PDAF, 2-axis OIS; Periscope Telephoto: 50 MP (4P lens), f/2.8, 80mm, FoV 30°, PDAF, 2-axis OIS, 3.5x optical zoom; Ultrawide: 50 MP (6P lens), f/2.0, 16mm, FoV 116°, AF; Reno14 F / Reno14 FS: Primary: 50 MP (5P lens), f/1.8, 26mm (wide), FoV 79°, 1/1.95", 0.8µm, PDAF, 2-axis OIS; Ultrawide: 8 MP (5P lens), f/2.2, 16mm, FoV 112°, 1/4.0", 1.12µm, AF; Macro: 2 MP (3P lens), f/2.4, FoV 89°, 1/5.0", 1.75µm, FF; Camera features: All: Color spectrum sensor, LED flash, HDR, panorama; Video recording: Reno14: 4K@30/60fps, 1080p@30/60/120fps, gyro-EIS, HDR; Reno14 Pro: 4K@30/60fps, 1080p@30/60/120/240fps, gyro-EIS, HDR; Reno14 F / Reno14 FS: 4K@30fps, 1080p@30/60/120fps, gyro-EIS, OIS
- Front camera: Reno14 / Reno14 Pro: 50 MP (5P lens), f/2.0, 21mm (wide), FoV 90°, AF; Reno14 F / Reno14 FS: 32 MP (5P lens), f/2.0, 22mm (wide), FoV 90°, 1/2.74", 0.8µm, FF; Camera features: Reno14 / Reno14 Pro: Panorama, HDR; Reno14 F / Reno14 FS: Panorama; Video recording: Reno14 / Reno14 Pro: 4K@30/60fps, 1080p@30/60fps, gyro-EIS, HDR; Reno14 F / Reno14 FS: 1080p@30fps
- Display: Reno14: 6.59 in (167 mm); 1256 x 2760 px resolution, (~460 ppi density); AMOLED, 1B colors, 120Hz, 3840Hz PWM, HDR10+, 600 nits (typ), 1200 nits (HBM); Corning Gorilla Glass 7i or Crystal Shield Glass; Reno14 Pro: 6.83 in (173 mm); 1272 x 2800 px resolution, (~450 ppi density); AMOLED, 1B colors, 120Hz, 3840Hz PWM, HDR10+, 600 nits (typ), 1200 nits (HBM); Corning Gorilla Glass 7i or Crystal Shield Glass; Reno14 F / Reno14 FS: 6.57 in (167 mm); 1080 x 2372 px resolution, (~397 ppi density); AMOLED, 1B colors, 120Hz, 600 nits (typ), 1400 nits (HBM); AGC Dragontrail DT-Star D+
- Sound: Stereo speakers
- Connectivity: Reno14 / Reno14 Pro: Wi-Fi 802.11 a/b/g/n/ac/6e, dual-band Reno14 F / Reno14 FS: Wi-Fi 802.11 a/b/g/n/ac, dual-band
- Water resistance: IP68/IP69 dust tight and water resistant (high pressure water jets; immersible up to 2m for 30 min)
- Model: Reno14: CPH2737, PLA110; Reno14 Pro: CPH2739, PKZ110; Reno14 F / Reno14 FS: CPH2743
- Development status: Released
- Made in: China
- Website: Reno14: www.oppo.com/en/smartphones/series-reno/reno14/ Reno14 Pro: www.oppo.com/en/smartphones/series-reno/reno14-pro/ Reno14 F: www.oppo.com/en/smartphones/series-reno/reno14-f-5g/ Reno14 FS: www.oppo.com/lu/smartphones/series-reno/reno14-fs-5g/

The Oppo Reno14 is a line of Android-based smartphones manufactured by Oppo as the successor to the Oppo Reno13 series. Launched first in China on 15 May 2025, and was released internationally on 1 July 2025, it comprises the Reno14 Pro 5G, Reno14 5G, Reno14 F 5G, and Reno14 FS 5G.

All models in the series run on ColorOS 15, OPPO’s Android-based operating system.

== Lineup ==
The Oppo Reno14 series consists of four models: the Reno14 Pro 5G, Reno14 5G, Reno14 F 5G, and Reno14 FS 5G. The lineup varies by market, with selected models released in different regions depending on availability and regional strategy.

== Specifications ==
=== Hardware ===
The Reno14 series is powered by different system-on-chip (SoC) platforms depending on the model. The Reno14 Pro 5G is equipped with the MediaTek Dimensity 8450 processor, while the Reno14 5G uses the MediaTek Dimensity 8350 chipset. The Reno14 F 5G and Reno14 FS 5G are powered by the Qualcomm Snapdragon 6 Gen 1 platform.

The devices are available in multiple memory and storage configurations depending on the market. The Reno14 Pro 5G and Reno14 5G are offered with up to 12 GB of RAM and internal storage options up to 512 GB. The Reno14 F 5G and Reno14 FS 5G are typically available with up to 8 GB of RAM and storage configurations up to 256 GB.

All models in the series run on OPPO’s ColorOS 15 user interface based on Android 15. The hardware configuration varies slightly across models to support different market segments within the Reno series lineup.

=== Design and Display ===
The Oppo Reno14 series features a slim design with a glass front and a finished rear panel. The camera module is integrated into the back panel as part of the overall design layout. The devices have curved edges and a lightweight construction intended to support everyday handling.

The Reno14 series features a 6.59-inch AMOLED display that offer and support a maximum refresh rate upto 120 Hz. The OLED panel supports adaptive refresh rates (60/90/120 Hz), up to 240 Hz touch sampling, and a screen-to-body ratio of approximately 93.4%.

Color options vary by model and market. The Reno14 Pro 5G is available in Dusk Brown and Aura Gold, while the Reno14 5G is offered in Dusk Brown and Aurora Blue. The Reno14 F 5G and Reno14 FS 5G are available in color variants including Afterglow Pink, Twilight Blue, New Mint Green and Aurora Blue.

=== Camera ===
The Reno14 series features different camera configurations depending on the model. The Reno14 Pro 5G is equipped with a triple-camera system consisting of a wide primary sensor, an ultra-wide lens, and a telephoto lens with optical image stabilization (OIS) to support stabilized photography and video recording. The Reno14 5G also includes a triple-camera setup with wide, ultra-wide, and telephoto sensors, designed to provide a range of focal lengths for general photography and zoom capabilities.

The Reno14 F 5G and Reno14 FS 5G are fitted with a triple-camera arrangement comprising a wide primary camera, an ultra-wide lens, and a macro sensor intended for close-range photography.

Front camera configurations vary across the lineup. The Reno14 Pro 5G and Reno14 5G include higher-resolution front cameras rated at up to 50 megapixels, while the Reno14 F 5G and Reno14 FS 5G feature 32-megapixel front-facing cameras for selfies and video calls.

=== Software ===
The OPPO Reno14 runs on Android 15 with OPPO’s ColorOS 15 user interface. ColorOS 15 includes interface customization options, system navigation features, privacy controls, and performance management tools. It also includes system-level optimizations and features intended to support multitasking and device security.

=== Battery and charging ===
The Oppo Reno14 5G is equipped with a 6000 mAh non-removable battery and the Reno14 Pro 5G has a slightly larger 6200 mAh battery. Both devices have 80 W SUPERVOOC wired fast charging, and the Pro variant supports 50 W AIRVOOC wireless charging.

== Release and pricing ==
The OPPO Reno14 series was announced in India on 3 July 2025. The lineup includes the Reno14 5G and Reno14 Pro 5G models.

In India, the Reno14 5G was introduced at ₹37,999 for the 8 GB + 128 GB variant, with higher configurations priced up to ₹42,999. The Reno14 Pro 5G launched at ₹49,999 for the 12 GB + 256 GB model and ₹54,999 for the 12 GB + 512 GB variant.

== Reception ==
Technology reviewers highlighted the Reno14 series for its battery capacity, display refresh rate, and camera features. The device’s 6000 mAh battery and 120 Hz display were frequently cited as notable specifications in the mid-range segment.
