= Oppo R17 =

Android Smartphone from Oppo

Oppo R17 Oppo R17 Pro (RX17 Pro in Europe) Oppo R17 Neo (RX17 Neo in Europe)
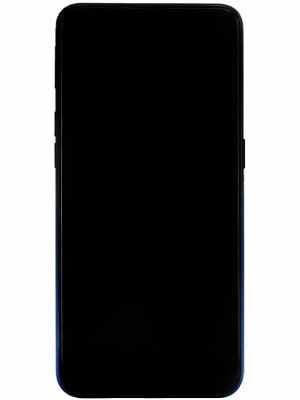
- The front face of an Oppo R17 Pro.
- Brand: Oppo
- Manufacturer: OPPO Electronics
- Type: Smartphone
- Series: Oppo R
- First released: R17: August 23, 2018; 7 years ago R17 Pro: August 30, 2018; 7 years ago R17 Neo: October 30, 2018; 7 years ago
- Availability by region: R17: List: August 23, 2018: China; October 6, 2018: Singapore; November 12, 2018: Australia; December 4, 2018: India; January 30, 2019: Saudi Arabia; R17 Pro: List: October 10, 2018: China; November 8, 2018: Philippines; November 10, 2018: Singapore; November 12, 2018: Australia; November 16, 2018: Italy France Spain Netherlands (Released as RX17 Pro); November 22, 2018: Malaysia; December 4, 2018: India; January 29, 2019: United Kingdom (as RX17 Pro); January 30, 2019: Saudi Arabia; R17 Neo: List: October 31, 2018: Japan; November 16, 2018: Italy France Spain Netherlands (Released as RX17 Neo); January 29, 2019: United Kingdom (as RX17 Neo)
- Predecessor: Oppo R15; Oppo R15 Pro
- Successor: Oppo Reno
- Compatible networks: List: Technology: R17: GSM / CDMA / HSPA / LTE; R17 Pro/R17 Neo: GSM / HSPA / LTE; 2G bands: R17: GSM 850 / 900 / 1800 / 1900; CDMA 800 & TD-SCDMA; R17 Pro/R17 Neo: GSM 850 / 900 / 1800 / 1900; 3G bands: R17: HSDPA 850 / 900 / 1700(AWS) / 1900 / 2100; R17 Pro/R17 Neo: HSDPA 800 / 850 / 900 / 1700(AWS) / 1900 / 2100; 4G bands (LTE): R17: 1, 2, 3, 4, 5, 7, 8, 34, 38, 39, 40, 41; 1, 2, 3, 4, 5, 7, 8, 20, 28, 38, 39, 40, 41; R17 Pro: 1, 2, 3, 4, 5, 7, 8, 12, 17, 18, 19, 20, 25, 26, 28, 32, 34, 38, 39, 40, 41; R17 Neo: 1, 2, 3, 4, 5, 7, 8, 18, 19, 20, 26, 28, 38, 39, 40, 41; Speed: R17/R17 Pro: HSPA 42.2/5.76 Mbps, LTE Cat15 800/150 Mbps; R17 Neo: HSPA 42.2/5.76 Mbps, LTE (2CA) Cat12 600/150 Mbps
- Form factor: Slate
- Colors: R17: Radiant Mist, Ambient Blue, Neon Purple; R17 Pro: Radiant Mist, Emerald Green; R17 Neo: Mocha Red, Astral Blue
- Dimensions: R17: 157.5 mm (6.20 in) H 74.9 mm (2.95 in) W 7.5 mm (0.30 in) D R17 Pro: 157.6 mm (6.20 in) H 74.6 mm (2.94 in) W 7.9 mm (0.31 in) D R17 Neo: 158.3 mm (6.23 in) H 75.5 mm (2.97 in) W 7.4 mm (0.29 in) D
- Weight: R17: 182 g (6.4 oz); R17 Pro: 183 g (6.5 oz); R17 Neo: 156 g (5.5 oz)
- Operating system: R17/R17 Pro: Original: Android 8.1 with ColorOS 5.2; Current: Android 10 with ColorOS 7.1; R17 Neo: Original: Android 8.1 with ColorOS 5.2; Current: Android 9 with ColorOS 6
- System-on-chip: R17: Qualcomm Snapdragon 670 (10 nm Samsung 10LPP); R17 Pro: Qualcomm Snapdragon 710 (10 nm Samsung 10LPP); R17 Neo: Qualcomm Snapdragon 660 (14 nm Samsung 14LPP)
- CPU: R17: Octa-core (2x2.0 GHz 360 Gold & 6x1.7 GHz Kryo 360 Silver); R17 Pro: Octa-core (2x2.2 GHz Kryo 360 Gold & 6x1.7 GHz Kryo 360 Silver); R17 Neo: Octa-core (4x2.0 GHz Kryo 260 Gold & 4x1.8 GHz Kryo 260 Silver)
- GPU: R17: Adreno 615; R17 Pro: Adreno 616; R17 Neo: Adreno 512
- Modem: R17/R17 Neo: Snapdragon X12 LTE; R17 Pro: Snapdragon X15 LTE
- Memory: R17/R17 Pro: 6, 8 GB; R17 Neo: 4 GB
- Storage: All: 128 GB
- Removable storage: R17: No; R17 Pro/R17 Neo: microSDXC, expandable up to 256 GB
- SIM: Dual nano-SIM
- Battery: R17: 3500 mAh lithium-polymer, non-removable R17 Pro: 3700 mAh (Dual-cell, 1850 mAh each) lithium-polymer, non-removable R17 Neo: 3600 mAh lithium-ion, non-removable
- Charging: R17: 20W VOOC Flash Charge; R17 Pro: 50W SuperVOOC Charge; R17 Neo: 10W Standard Charge
- Rear camera: Dual-Camera Setup; R17: Primary: Sony IMX 519; 16 MP, f/1.7, 25mm, 1/2.53", 1.22μm, PDAF; Depth: Samsung ISOCELL S5K5E9; 5 MP, f/2.4, 1/5.0", 1.12μm; R17 Neo: Primary: Sony IMX 398; 16 MP, f/1.75, 26mm, 1/2.8", 1.12μm, PDAF; Depth: OmniVision OV02A10; 2 MP, f/2.4, 1/5.0", 1.75μm; Triple-Camera Setup; R17 Pro: Primary: Sony IMX 362; 12 MP, f/1.5-2.4, 26mm, 1/2.55", 1.4μm, dual pixel PDAF, OIS; Secondary: Sony IMX 350; 20 MP, f/2.6, 1/2.78", 1.0μm, AF; TOF 3D: Sony IMX 316; 0.043 MP (240x180), f/1.14, 1/6.0", 10μm, depth; Features: R17/R17 Pro: Dual-LED flash, HDR, panorama; R17 Neo: LED flash, HDR, panorama; Video: R17/R17 Pro: 4K@30fps, 1080p@30fps; R17 Neo: 1080p@30fps
- Front camera: Sony IMX 576; 25 MP, f/2.0, 26mm, 1/2.78", 0.9μm; Features: All: HDR; Video: All: 1080p@30fps
- Display: R17: 6.40 in (163 mm); 1080 x 2340 px resolution, 19.5:9 ratio (~403 ppi density); AMOLED, 60Hz; Corning Gorilla Glass 6 R17 Pro: 6.40 in (163 mm); 1080 x 2340 px resolution, 19.5:9 ratio (~402 ppi density); AMOLED, 60Hz; Corning Gorilla Glass 6 R17 Neo: 6.41 in (163 mm); 1080 x 2340 px resolution, 19.5:9 ratio (~402 ppi density); Super AMOLED, 60Hz
- Sound: R17/R17 Neo: Loudspeaker, 3.5 mm auxiliary (headphone jack); R17 Pro: Loudspeaker
- Water resistance: None
- Model: R17: CPH1879, PBEM00, PBET00; R17 Pro: CPH1877, PBDM00, PBDT00; R17 Neo: CPH1893
- Development status: Discontinued
- Other: Light sensor, Distance sensor, G-sensor, E-compass, AI Scene and Object Recognition Sensor, ToF 3D Sensor (R17 Pro)
- Website: www.oppo.com/en/smartphone-r17 www.oppo.com/en/smartphone-r17-pro

The Oppo R17 (RX17 in Europe) is a line of Android phablets manufactured by Oppo. It comprises the Oppo R17, R17 Pro, and R17 Neo, which were officially unveiled on August 23, 2018 for the Chinese market. The R17 was the first smartphone to receive Oppo's "Hyper Boost Acceleration Engine," which provides improvements in gaming performance, system, and app usage.

== Specifications ==
=== Oppo R17 ===
==== Hardware ====
The Oppo R17 is powered by 2*2.0 GHz 360 Gold & 6*1.7 GHz Kryo 360 Silver octa-core processor with Qualcomm Snapdragon 670 Chipset, and has 6GB of RAM and 128GB of storage. It operates on ColorOS 5.2 which is a customized version of Android 8.1 (Oreo). It has a 25 MP front camera and 16MP + 5 MP rear cameras. And the Oppo R17 has 3500 mAh batteries and is powered by VOOC fast wired charging.

==== Memory ====
The Oppo R17 has a 128GB built-in memory and 2 microSD slots which supports up to 256GB of additional storage.

==== Display ====
The Oppo R17 has a 6.4-inch AMOLED capacitive display covered by Corning Gorilla Glass 6. It is also the first phone in the world to have this glass. Under the display is an in-screen fingerprint sensor as standard.

==== Colors ====
It is available in three colors – Radiant Mist, Ambient Blue, and Neon Purple. Oppo also start to sell a new color option for the R17 named as Foggy Gold last November 11 in China.

==== Camera ====
Its dual rear cameras are a 16 MP main camera and a 5 MP depth sensor equipped with AI Scene and Object Recognition, while its front camera has 25 mega pixels.

==== Software ====
The Oppo R17 runs on Color OS 5.2, based on Android 8.1. and has a Google Assistant and Lens feature on its software.

=== Oppo R17 Pro ===
==== Hardware ====
The Oppo R17 Pro is powered by 2*2.2 GHz Kryo 360 Gold & 6*1.7 GHz Kryo 360 Silver octa-core processor with Qualcomm Snapdragon 710 Chipset, and has 6GB/8GB of RAM and 128GB of storage. It operates on ColorOS 5.2 which is a customized version of Android 8.1 (Oreo). It has a 25 MP front camera and three rear cameras, include the world's first time of flight depth-sensing camera. And the Oppo R17 Pro has two 1850 mAh batteries and is powered by VOOC fast wired charging which charges 40% of battery in 10 minutes.

Sim Slot

SIM Card Type: Nano-SIM / Nano-USIM

Connectivity

GPS: GPS/A-GPS/GLONASS/Beidou/Galileo

Bluetooth: 5.0

WLAN Function: 2.4/5.1/5.8GHz

OTG: Support

NFC: Support

==== Memory ====
The Oppo R17 Pro has a 128GB built-in memory and 2microSD slots which supports up to 256GB of additional storage.

==== Display ====
The Oppo R17 Pro features a 6.4-inch (16.2cm) 1080x2340 pixel, AMOLED on-cell touchscreen: Multi-touch, Capacitive Screen, with a pixel density of 402 pixels per inch, and an aspect ratio of 19.5:9. Its resolution is 2340 by 1080 pixels. The display is covered by a single pane of Corning Gorilla Glass 6.

==== Colors ====
It will have a Radiant Mist and Emerald Green color option.

==== Camera ====
It has three cameras on the rear. It has a 12 million pixel depth sensor, a 20 million pixel camera with Dual-Aperture and AI ultra-clear engine. One is a 20MP wide-angle camera with f/2.6 aperture, and the other with dual pixel PDAF, optical image stabilization and an aperture of f/2.4. The front facing camera is 25-megapixels with an f/2.0 aperture powered by AI.

==== Software ====
The Oppo R17 Pro is equipped with the ColorOS 5.2 which based on Android 8.1 "Oreo" mobile operating system.

=== Oppo R17 Neo (a.k.a. Oppo K1) ===
The phone comes with multiple names. 64GB version in China is called K1 while 128GB is called R15x. International version is called R17 Neo while RX17 Neo is used in Europe.

==== Colors ====
It will have a Mocha Red and Astral Blue color option.

==== Camera ====
It has a 16 MP + 2 MP dual-rear camera while it uses a 25 MP front camera

==== Performance ====
Neo uses a 4+128 GB of memory combination with a 1.95 GHz tuned-down Qualcomm Snapdragon 660 Processor. R15x uses a 6+128 GB of memory combination with the same processor. K1 has two combination:4+64 or 6+64 GB. The differences between them are only the name and memory combination.

== Availability ==
=== Global ===
The Oppo R17 and R17 Pro were posted on their global website the same date where it was in their Singapore web on October 6, 2018. The phones' web catalog is on English language. They were available to the public on October 10, 2018. Meanwhile, before their availability, Oppo added a special website regarding the R-Series' heritage and history. A video was posted on YouTube related to the R-Series' history.

An official product video for the R17 was released on October 17, 2018 on YouTube. Meanwhile, a full video for the R17 Pro filmed in London was released on October 30, 2018.

=== China ===
The R17, together with the R17 Pro, were available on August 30, 2018, in China. Oppo released a New Year Edition for both phones in December 2018.

=== Italy ===
Named as the RX17 and RX17 Pro, they were revealed at Milan, Italy on November 6, 2018.

=== Philippines ===
A special event for the launch of the R17 Pro was launched in the Philippines last November 7, 2018.

=== India ===
The Oppo R17 Pro was launched in India on December 4. 2018
