= Oppo Reno15 =

2025 smartphone by Oppo

OPPO Reno15
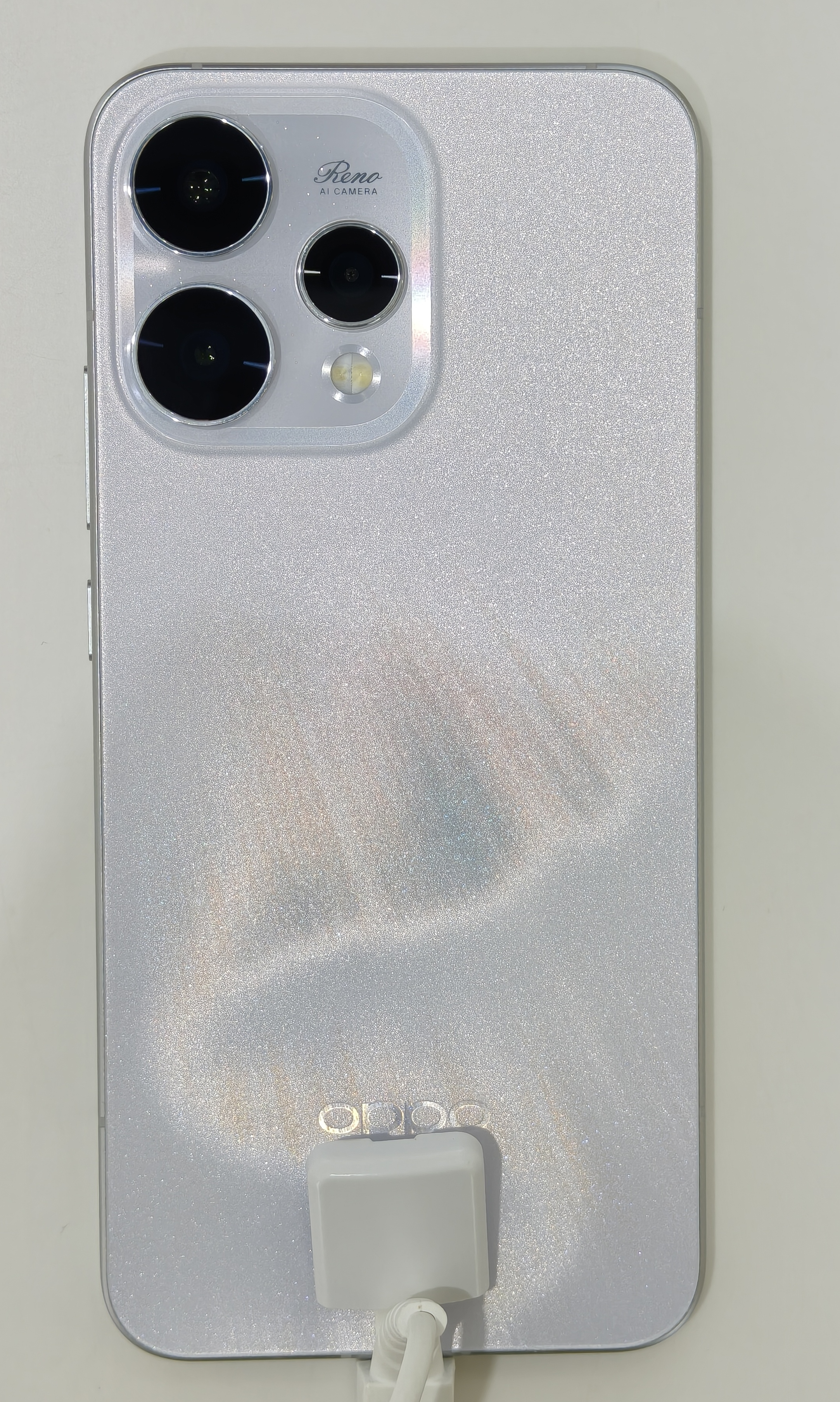
- Oppo Reno15 in Aurora White
- Brand: OPPO
- Manufacturer: OPPO
- Type: Smartphone
- Series: OPPO Reno
- First released: 2 January 2026
- Availability by region: Global: January 2, 2026; India: January 8, 2026; 6 days after global release
- Predecessor: OPPO Reno14
- Successor: OPPO Reno16
- Form factor: Slate
- Colors: Reno15 Pro Max: Dusk Brown; Aura Gold; Reno15 Pro: Dusk Brown; Aurora Blue; Reno15: Aurora Blue; Twilight Blue; Aurora White; Reno15 F / FS: Afterglow Pink; Twilight Blue; Aurora Blue
- Dimensions: 160.2×74.3×7.6 mm (6.31×2.93×0.30 in)
- Weight: Reno15 Pro Max: 205g Reno15 Pro: 188g Reno15 5G: 197g Reno15 F / FS: 195g
- Operating system: ColorOS 16 (based on Android 16)
- System-on-chip: Qualcomm Snapdragon 7 Gen 4
- CPU: Octa-core
- GPU: Adreno GPU
- Storage: 128 GB / 256 GB / 512 GB (UFS)
- SIM: Nano-SIM card, Nano-USIM card, eSIM
- Battery: Reno15 Pro Max: 6500mAh/25.48Wh; Reno15 Pro 5G: 6200mAh/24.31Wh; Reno15 5G: 6500mAh/25.48Wh; Reno15 F/FS 5G: 7000mAh/27.44Wh and 6500mAh/25.48Wh
- Charging: 80W SuperVOOC
- Rear camera: 50 MP (wide), OIS; 8 MP (ultra-wide), 116° 50 MP (telephoto), 3.5× optical zoom, OIS
- Front camera: 50 MP, autofocus, 100° (ultra-wide)
- Display: 6.59 in AMOLED, Full HD+, HDR10+

The Oppo Reno15 is a line of Android-based smartphones manufactured by Oppo as the successor to the Oppo Reno14 series. The Reno15 series was first unveiled in China on 17 November 2025, with global availability beginning in January 2026. The lineup comprises five models: Reno15 Pro Max, Reno15 Pro and Reno15, Reno15 F and Reno15 FS.

== Specifications ==
=== Hardware ===
The Reno15 includes a 6.59-inch display and is powered by the Qualcomm Snapdragon 7 Gen 4 processor. Across the series, displays support HDR10+ certification (excluding Reno15 F/FS) and include Splash Touch and Glove Touch functionality for wet-screen operation. All models support OPPO's 80W SUPERVOOC fast-charging technology.

=== Design and build ===
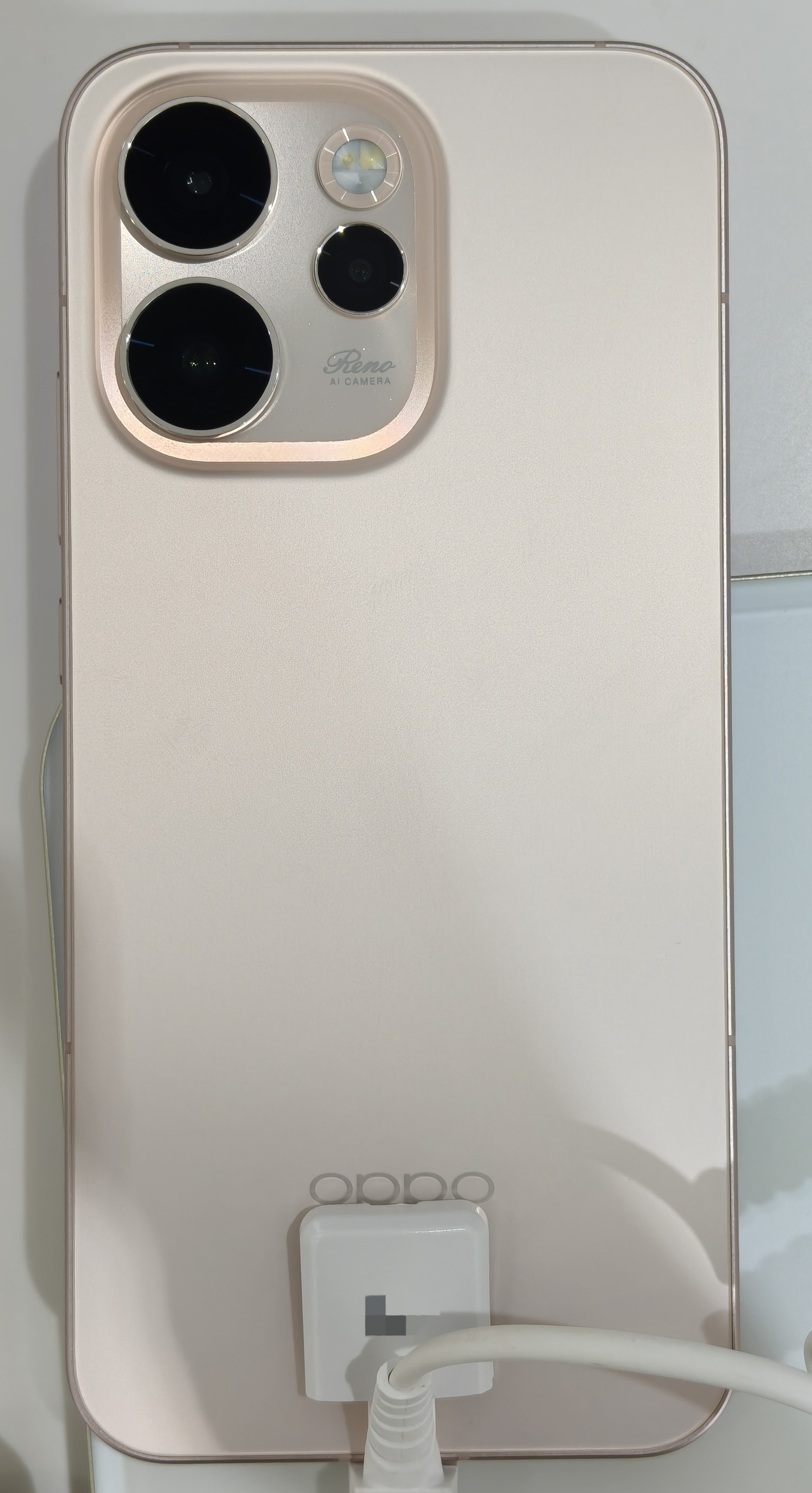
Oppo Reno15 Pro Max

The OPPO Reno15 series features a textured glass rear panel with micro-etched patterns that create color-shifting effects when viewed from different angles. The rear camera module is integrated into a square-ring housing with a reflective finish, continuing design elements introduced in earlier Reno series devices.

All models has a sculpted glass back panel and an aluminum frame. The Reno15 Pro Max and Reno15 Pro models feature slim display bezels, with the Pro Max achieving a screen-to-body ratio of approximately 95.5 percent. Select Reno15 F and Reno15 FS variants are available with a Velvet Glass-feel panel finish on certain color options. The series is rated IP69 for water and dust resistance.

=== Display ===
The OPPO Reno15 features a 6.59-inch AMOLED display with Full HD+ resolution and a high refresh rate to provide smooth scrolling and improved visual responsiveness. The panel supports HDR10+ certification, enabling enhanced contrast and color reproduction when viewing compatible content. The display incorporates Splash Touch and Glove Touch functionality, allowing the screen to remain responsive when wet or when operated while wearing gloves.

Across the Reno15 series, the display design emphasizes slim bezels and high screen-to-body ratios for immersive viewing experience.

=== Camera ===
The OPPO Reno15 series includes rear camera systems that vary by model. All devices in the series are equipped with a 50-megapixel front-facing camera with autofocus and a wide field of view.

The Reno15 Pro Max and Reno15 Pro are equipped with a triple rear camera setup consisting of a 200-megapixel primary sensor with optical image stabilization (OIS), a 50-megapixel ultra-wide lens with a 116-degree field of view, and a 50-megapixel telephoto lens supporting 3.5× optical zoom and OIS. The Reno15 features a triple rear camera setup consisting of a 50-megapixel primary sensor with OIS, an 8-megapixel ultra-wide lens with a 116-degree field of view, and a 50-megapixel telephoto lens providing 3.5× optical zoom.

The Reno15 F and Reno15 FS models include a 50-megapixel main camera with OIS, an 8-megapixel ultra-wide lens with a 112-degree field of view, and a 2-megapixel macro camera. Software-based imaging features include portrait processing, low-light enhancement, and object removal tools.

The Reno15 Pro Max and Reno15 Pro support 4K HDR video recording at up to 60 frames per second and combine electronic image stabilization (EIS) with optical image stabilization (OIS) to improve recording stability. Additional video capabilities include simultaneous front- and rear-camera recording, lens switching during recording, and underwater video recording modes. The camera software includes computational photography features such as automated lighting adjustment and low-light portrait enhancement.

=== Software ===
The OPPO Reno15 series ships with ColorOS 16, based on Android 16. ColorOS 16 includes system management and utility features such as Trinity Engine, a resource scheduling system designed to manage performance across applications, and AI Mind Space, which allows users to capture and organize on-screen information using gesture input. The software also supports real-time translation functions, cross-platform file sharing, and device security tools, including anti-theft protections and secure cloud processing for sensitive data.

=== Battery ===
Battery capacity varies by model within the Reno15 series. The Reno15 Pro Max and Reno15 5G are equipped with a 6,500 mAh battery (rated at 25.48 Wh), while the Reno15 Pro 5G includes a 6,200 mAh battery (24.31 Wh). The Reno15 F/FS 5G is offered with either a 7,000 mAh battery (27.44 Wh) or a 6,500 mAh battery (25.48 Wh), depending on the variant.
