= Oppo R15 Pro =

Android Smartphone from Oppo

- Brand: Oppo
- Manufacturer: Oppo
- Type: Smartphone
- Series: OPPO R
- First released: March 31, 2018; 8 years ago
- Availability by region: 2018-04-01 (China)
- Predecessor: Oppo R11s
- Successor: Oppo R17 Pro
- Compatible networks: GSM 850 900 1800 1900; WCDMA 850 900 1900 2100; LTE Bands 1 3 7 8 TD-40 for International Version; LTE Bands 1 3 5 7 8 28 TD-40 for Taiwan Version; LTE Bands 1 4 7 17 for US Version
- Form factor: Phablet
- Dimensions: 156.5 mm (6.16 in) H 75.2 mm (2.96 in) W 8.0 mm (0.31 in) D
- Weight: 180 g (6.3 oz)
- Operating system: ColorOS 5.0 based on Android 8.1
- CPU: Qualcomm Snapdragon 660 AIE Octa-core
- GPU: Adreno 512
- Memory: 6 GB
- Storage: 128 GB
- Removable storage: 256 GB
- Battery: 3430 mAh
- Rear camera: Dual-Camera Setup; Primary: Sony IMX 519; 16 MP, f/1.7, 25mm, 1/2.53", 1.22μm, PDAF; Secondary: Sony IMX 376k; 20 MP, f/1.7, 25mm, 1/2.78", 1.0μm; Features: LED flash, HDR, panorama; Video: 4K@30fps, 1080p@60/120fps, 720p@240fps
- Front camera: Sony IMX 376; 20 MP, f/2.0, 20mm (wide), 1/2.78", 1.0μm; Video: 1080p@30fps
- Display: 6.28 in (160 mm) AMOLED capacitive touchscreen, multi-touch display, 2280x1080 pixels
- Connectivity: List: Wi-Fi :802.11 b/g/n (2,4 GHz + 5GHz); Hotspot (Wi-Fi); GPS; Bluetooth 5.0; USB On-The-Go
- Codename: R15 Pro
- Other: Light sensor, Distance sensor, G-sensor, E-compass

The Oppo R15 Pro is a phablet smartphone based on Android 8.1, which was unveiled in March 2018.

== Specifications ==
=== Hardware ===
The Oppo R15 Pro has a 6.28-inch AMOLED capacitive display, Octa-core (4x2.2 GHz Kryo 260 & 4x1.8 GHz Kryo 260) Qualcomm Snapdragon 660 processor, 6 GB of RAM and 128 GB of internal storage that can be expanded using microSD cards up to 256 GB. The phone has a 3430 mAh Li-ion battery, 16 MP rear camera with LED flash and 20 MP front-facing camera with auto-focus. It is available in ceramic black, dream mirror red and galaxy purple. Non-Chinese versions could also get NFC and IP67 water-and-dust proof.

=== Software ===
Oppo R15 Pro ships with Android 8.1 Oreo.
