= Oppo Reno2 =

2019 Android smartphones from Oppo

Oppo Reno2 Oppo Reno2 F Oppo Reno2 Z
- Brand: Oppo
- Manufacturer: Oppo
- Type: Smartphone
- First released: August 28, 2019; 6 years ago
- Predecessor: Oppo Reno
- Successor: Oppo Reno 3 & Reno 3 Pro
- Related: Oppo Reno 3
- Dimensions: 160.00×74.30×9.50 mm (6.299×2.925×0.374 in)
- Weight: 189 g (7 oz)
- Operating system: ColorOS 6.1, based on Android 9 Pie upgradable to ColorOS 11.1 Based on Android 11
- System-on-chip: Qualcomm Snapdragon 730G
- CPU: 2x2.2 GHz + 6x1.8 GHz
- GPU: Adreno 618
- Memory: 8GB RAM
- Storage: 256GB
- Battery: 4000mAh
- Rear camera: Quad-Camera Setup; Reno2: Primary: Sony IMX 586; 48 MP, f/1.7, 26mm, 1/2.0", 0.8μm, PDAF, OIS; Telephoto: Samsung ISOCELL Slim S5K3M5; 13 MP, f/2.4, 53mm, 1/3.4", 1.0μm, PDAF, 2x optical zoom; Ultrawide: Sony IMX 319; 8 MP, f/2.2, 13mm, FoV 116°, 1/3.2", 1.4μm; Monochrome: GalaxyCore GC02MOB; 2 MP B/W, f/2.4, 1/5.0", 1.75μm; Reno2 F/Reno2 Z: Primary: Samsung ISOCELL S5KGM1 (Reno2 F); Sony IMX 586 (Reno2 Z); 48 MP, f/1.79 (Reno2 F), f/1.7 (Reno2 Z), 26mm, 1/2.25" (Reno2 F), 1/2.0" (Reno2 Z), 0.8μm, PDAF; Ultrawide: OmniVision OV8856; 8 MP, f/2.2, 13mm, FoV 119°, 1/4.0", 1.12μm; Monochrome: OmniVision OV02A1B; 2 MP B/W, f/2.4, 1/5.0", 1.75μm, fixed focus; Depth: OmniVision OV02A1B; 2 MP, f/2.4, 1/5.0", 1.75μm, fixed focus; Features: All: Dual-LED flash, HDR, panorama; Video: Reno2: 4K@30fps, 1080p@30/60fps (gyro-EIS); video rec. only with main camera; Reno2 F: 1080p@30fps, gyro-EIS; video rec. only with main camera; Reno2 Z: 4K@30fps, 1080p@30fps (gyro-EIS)
- Front camera: Sony IMX 471 or Samsung ISOCELL S5K3P9SP Motorized pop-up Shark-fin (Reno2) Vertical (Reno2 F/Reno2 Z) 16 MP, f/2.0, 26mm (wide), FoV 79°, 1/3.06", 1.0μm; Features: All: LED flash, HDR; Video: All: 1080p@30fps
- Display: 2400×1080, AMOLED touchscreen with 93.1% screen to body ratio Corning Gorilla Glass 6 Aspect ratio: 20:9
- Sound: Vibration; MP3, WAV ringtones
- Connectivity: 2G, 3G, 4G LTE
- Other: 2G, 3G, LTE, LTE-A, CDMA, EVDO
- Website: Official page

Oppo Reno2 is a line of Android smartphones manufactured by Oppo as the successor to the Oppo Reno series. Launched on 28 August 2019 in India, it comprises the Oppo Reno2, Reno2 F, and Reno2 Z. Like their flagship predecessors, the Reno2 phones feature pop-up selfie cameras to provide edge-to-edge displays.

== Specifications ==
=== Hardware ===
The Oppo Reno2 is powered by 2x2.2 GHz octa-core processor with Qualcomm Snapdragon 730G chipset, and has 8 GB of RAM and 256 GB of storage. It operates on ColorOS 6.1 which is a customized version of Android 9 Pie. The front shark fin pop-up selfie camera is 16 MP, and there are 4 rear cameras, including a 48 MP main camera, 8 MP wide-angle lens, 13 MP telephoto lens, and a 2 MP mono lens. The Oppo Reno2 features a 4000 mAh battery and is powered by VOOC flash charge 3.0.

==== Display ====
The Oppo Reno2 features a 6.5 inches (170 mm) 2400×1080 pixel, AMOLED capacitive touchscreen display at 401 ppi, and an aspect ratio of 20:9. The display is covered by a single pane of Corning Gorilla Glass 6.0.

==== Memory ====
The Oppo Reno2 has 256 GB of built in memory and a dedicated Micro SD slot which supports up to 256 GB of additional storage.

==== Battery ====
The Oppo Reno2 is equipped with a Non-removable Li-Po 4000 mAh battery. It has VOOC flash charge 3.0, the company claims it can be charged up to 75% in just 30 minutes

==== Camera ====
The Oppo Reno2 has a 16 MP shark fin style pop-up selfie camera in the front and four cameras on the rear. A 48 MP main camera with 1/2.0 senor and f/1.7 aperture, a 13 MP telephoto lens with 1/3.4 sensor and f/2.4 aperture, an 8 MP wide angle lens with 1/3.2 sensor and a 2 MP mono lens The company claims that the OPPO Reno2 has advanced Ultra Steady Video stabilization which can help take clear footage when on the move, it supports telescopic view with 5x hybrid and 20x digital zoom, and it can capture scenes in the night with Ultra Dark Mode.

=== Software ===
The Oppo Reno2 is equipped with the ColorOS 6.0.1 which is based on Android 9.0 Pie mobile operating system. Going to get updates of Android 10 and 11 respectively
