= Oppo Find X3 =

2021 Android-based smartphones produced by Oppo no smart cover option

Oppo Find X3 Oppo Find X3 Pro
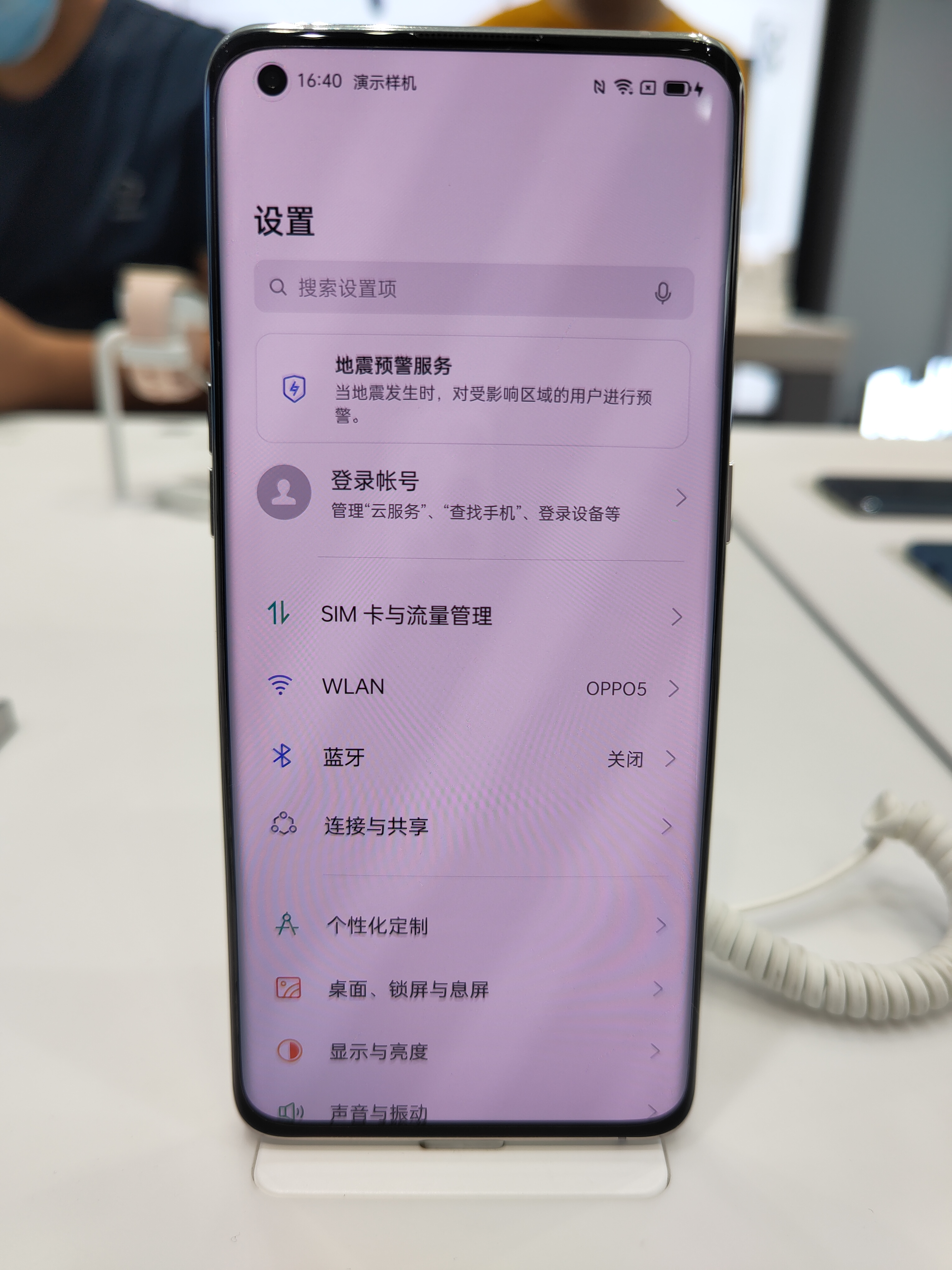
- Brand: Oppo
- Manufacturer: Oppo
- Type: Phablet
- Predecessor: Oppo Find X2
- Successor: Oppo Find X5
- Related: Oppo Find X3 Lite; Oppo Find X3 Neo; OnePlus 9 Pro
- Compatible networks: 2G, 3G, 4G and 5G
- Form factor: Slate
- Dimensions: 163.6 mm × 74 mm × 8.3 mm (6.44 in × 2.91 in × 0.33 in)
- Weight: 193 g (6.8 oz)
- Operating system: ColorOS 11.2 (based on Android 11)
- System-on-chip: Find X3 Lite: Qualcomm Snapdragon 765G; Find X3 Neo: Qualcomm Snapdragon 865; Find X3: Qualcomm Snapdragon 870; Find X3 Pro: Qualcomm Snapdragon 888
- CPU: Octa-core, Find X3 Neo: (1x 2.84 GHz Kryo 585 & 3x 2.42 GHz Kryo 585 & 4x 1.8 GHz Kryo 585); Find X3: (1x 3.2 GHz Kryo 585 & 3x 2.42 GHz Kryo 585 & 4x 1.8 GHz Kryo 585); Find X3 Pro: (1x 2.84 GHz Kryo 680 & 3x 2.42 GHz Kryo 680 & 4x 1.8 GHz Kryo 680)
- GPU: Find X3 Lite: Adreno 620; Find X3 Neo: Adreno 650; Find X3: Adreno 650; Find X3 Pro: Adreno 660
- Memory: 8 or 12 GB LPDDR5 RAM
- Storage: 128 GB or 256 GB UFS 3.1
- Removable storage: None
- Battery: 4500 mAh
- Charging: SuperVOOC technology
- Rear camera: 50 MP, f/1.8, 1/1.56", 1.0 μm (wide) + 50 MP, f/2.2, 1/1.56", 1.0 μm (ultrawide) + 13 MP, f/2.4, 52 mm (telephoto) + 3 MP, f/3.0 (macro), 2x optical zoom, omnidirectional PDAF, OIS, gyro-EIS, dual-LED flash, Auto HDR, 4K@30/60 fps, 1080p@30/60/240 fps
- Front camera: 32 MP, f/2.4, 26 mm, 1/2.8", 0.8 μm 1080p@30 fps, HDR
- Display: 6.7 in (170 mm) LTPO AMOLED capacitive touchscreen, 3216 × 1440 1440p, (525 ppi with 20:9 aspect ratio), 120 Hz refresh rate, 1B colors, HDR10+
- Sound: Dolby Atmos stereo speakers with active noise cancellation
- Connectivity: Bluetooth 5.2; Wi-Fi a/b/g/n/ac/6e; A2DP, LE, aptX HD
- Data inputs: Fingerprint scanner (optical); Accelerometer; gyroscope; proximity sensor; electronic compass
- Website: oppo.com/en/smartphones/series-find-x/find-x3-pro

The Oppo Find X3 and Oppo Find X3 Pro are Android-based smartphones manufactured by Oppo, unveiled in March 2021, succeeding the Oppo Find X2 and Find X2 Pro.

== Specifications ==
=== Design ===
The Find X3 and Find X3 Pro use anodized aluminum for the frame, while the display is protected by Gorilla Glass 5, which is curved around the edges. The back panel is manufactured from a single piece of glass, with a contoured camera protrusion housing four rear cameras and the dual-LED flash. Both phones have IP68 water resistance; color options are Gloss Black, Blue, and White.

=== Hardware ===
The Find X3 and Find X3 Pro use the Snapdragon 870 and Snapdragon 888 processors, respectively. Both devices offer UFS 3.1 with no expandable storage. The Find X3 has 128 or 256 GB paired with 8 GB of RAM, while the Find X3 Pro has 256 GB paired with 8 or 12 GB of RAM. Both feature a 6.7-inch (170 mm) LTPO AMOLED display of 1440p resolution with an adaptive 120 Hz refresh rate. The display has HDR10+ support, and is capable of showing over 1 billion colors. The battery capacity is 4500 mAh; wired fast charging is supported at 65 W, and wireless charging at 30 W. Both phones include Dolby Atmos stereo speakers with active noise cancellation, but no audio jack. Biometric options include an optical fingerprint scanner and facial recognition.

==== Camera ====
The Find X3 and Find X3 Pro have identical camera setups. The 50 MP Sony IMX766 is utilized for the wide and ultrawide sensors, featuring native 10-bit color capture. The telephoto sensor has a 13 MP sensor with 2x optical zoom. New to the Find X3 series is a 3 MP microlens advertised with up to 60x magnification. The front camera remains unchanged, using a 32 MP sensor.

=== Battery ===
The Oppo Find X3 and Find X3 Pro both use a 4500 mAh Li-Po battery, and both models support 65W wired charging (SuperVOOC 2.0), capable of a 40% charge in just 10 minutes. Both offer 30W wireless charging and 10W reverse wireless charging.

=== Software ===
The Find X3 and Find X3 Pro run on ColorOS 11.2, which is based on no smart cover Android 11.
