= Oppo Reno3 Pro =

Smartphones manufactured by Oppo

Oppo Reno3 Oppo Reno3 5G (Oppo Find X2 Neo)
- Brand: Oppo
- Type: Reno3 Pro: Smartphone; Reno3 Pro 5G: Phablet
- Series: Reno
- First released: Reno3 Pro: March 2, 2020; 6 years ago Reno3 Pro 5G: December 26, 2019; 6 years ago
- Availability by region: Reno3 Pro; March 2, 2020; India; March 6, 2020; Initial release May 2, 2020; Philippines; Reno Pro 5G; December 26, 2019; China
- Successor: Oppo Reno4 Pro
- Related: Oppo Reno3
- Compatible networks: Reno3 Pro; GSM / HSPA / LTE; Reno3 Pro 5G; GSM / CDMA / HSPA / EVDO / LTE / 5G
- Form factor: Slate
- Colors: Reno3 Pro; Midnight Black, Aurora Blue, Sky White; Reno3 Pro 5G; Black, White, Starry Night, Sunrise, Classic Blue
- Dimensions: 4G model: 158.8 × 73.4 × 8.1 mm 5G model: 159.4 × 72.4 × 7.7 mm
- Operating system: Initial: Android 10 with ColorOS 7 UI; Current: Android 12 with ColorOS 12.1 UI
- System-on-chip: Reno3 Pro: Mediatek MT6779V Helio P95 (12 nm); Reno3 Pro 5G: Qualcomm SM7250 Snapdragon 765G 5G (7 nm)
- CPU: Octa-core; Reno3 Pro: 2x 2.2 GHz Cortex-A75 & 6x 2.0 GHz Cortex-A55; Reno3 Pro 5G: 1x 2.4 GHz Kryo 475 Prime & 1x 2.2 GHz Kryo 475 Gold & 6x 1.8 GHz Kryo 475 Silver
- GPU: Reno3 Pro: PowerVR GM9446; Reno3 Pro 5G: Adreno 620
- Memory: 8GB / 12GB (12GB support the 5G model only); UFS 2.1
- Storage: 128GB / 256GB
- Removable storage: microSDXC (4G model only)
- SIM: Both models: Dual nanoSIM
- Battery: 4025 mAh Lithium-polymer battery
- Charging: Reno3: Fast charging up to 30W, USB Type-C 2.0; Fast charging up to 30W, USB Type-C 3.1
- Rear camera: Quad-Camera; Reno3 Pro 4G: 64MP 1/1.72" wide-angle (f/1.7, 27mm) with Samsung GW1 sensor, 13MP 1/3.4" telephoto lens (f/2.4, 52mm), 8MP 1/4.0", ultrawide-angle (f/2.2, 13mm), 2MP monochrome lens (f/2.4); Reno3 Pro 5G: 48MP 1/2.0" wide-angle (f/1.7, 26mm) with Sony IMX586 sensor and image stabilization, 13MP 1/3.4" telephoto lens (f/2.4, 53mm), 8MP 1/3.2" ultrawide-angle with viewing angle at 115° (f/2.2, 13mm), 2MP 1/5.0" B/W (f/2.4); Video recording supports 4K@30fps and 1080p@30/60fps for 4G model, while the 5G supports the same supportable resolutions + 120fps + OIS; with gyro-EIS
- Front camera: Dual-front; Reno3 Pro: 44 MP, f/2.4, 26mm (wide), 1/2.65"; 2MP, (f/2.4) depth sensor Single-front; Reno3 Pro 5G: 32 MP, f/2.4, 26mm (wide), 1/2.8"; Both models support HDR, with 1080p @ 30fps video recording
- Display: Reno3 Pro: 6.4-inch Super AMOLED; 500 nits (typical); 1080 × 2400 pixels; 20:9 ratio Reno3 Pro 5G: 6.5-inch AMOLED; 500 nits (typical); 1080 × 2400 pixels; 20:9 ratio
- Sound: Mono speakers 3.5mm stereo audio jack
- Connectivity: Both Models: GPS, GLONASS, GALILEO, BDS
- Made in: China

The Oppo Reno3 Pro and Reno3 Pro 5G are mid-range Android smartphones manufactured by OPPO as the high-end version of the Oppo Reno3. It was launched on March 2, 2020 for the 4G model and on December 26, 2019, for the 5G model in Hangzhou, China, along with the Reno3.

== Specifications ==
=== Design & Build ===
Both models in the front are made of Corning Gorilla Glass 5 and has a glass texture at the back. The frame is made of plastic, while the 5G model has its aluminum texture. With dimensions at 158.8 × 73.4 × 8.1 mm for the 4G model and 159.4 × 72.4 × 7.7 mm for the 5G model respectively, The 4G has its super AMOLED display with resolution at 1080 × 2400 pixels and a 20:9 aspect ratio, while the 5G uses its standard AMOLED display with same resolution and ratio. Also, the 4G model has its 6.4-inch display, while the 5G model comes with a litter bigger display, which is 6.5 inches.

The phone was available at multiple color options, but differs from the following models:

- Reno3 Pro: Midnight Black, Aurora Blue, Sky White (3 colors)
- Reno3 Pro 5G: Black, White, Starry Night, Sunrise, Classic Blue (5 colors)

=== Hardware ===
The Reno4 Pro (4G model) is powered by the MediaTek Helio P95 chipset with an octa-core (layered with two 2.2 GHz Cortex-A75 cores and six 2.0 GHz Cortex-A55 cores) and PowerVR GM9446 GPU, while the 5G model is powered by the Qualcomm SM7250 Snapdragon 765G 5G (7 nm) chipset with a different octa-core layout (one 2.4 GHz Kryo 475 Prime + 2.2 GHz Kryo 475 Gold; and six 1.8 GHz Kryo 475 Silver cores) and the Adreno 620. Both devices powered by a 4025 mAh li-po battery with 30 watt VOOC 4.0 fast charging, which takes about 20 minutes to reach 50% according to the manufacture's claim.

Both models support 128GB and 256GB of internal storage. The Reno3 supports 8GB of RAM while the Reno3 5G supports 8GB and 12GB of RAM.

=== Camera ===
All smartphones received their quad camera setup with different layout from the models:

- The Reno3 Pro has a 64MP 1/1.72" wide-angle (f/1.7, 27mm) with Samsung GW1 sensor, a 13MP 1/3.4" telephoto lens (f/2.4, 52mm), an 8MP 1/4.0", ultrawide-angle (f/2.2, 13mm), and a 2MP monochrome lens (f/2.4).
- The Reno3 Pro 5G has a 48MP 1/2.0" wide-angle (f/1.7, 26mm) with Sony IMX586 sensor and image stabilization, a 13MP 1/3.4" telephoto lens (f/2.4, 53mm), an 8MP 1/3.2" ultrawide-angle with viewing angle at 115° (f/2.2, 13mm), and a 2MP 1/5.0" B/W (f/2.4).

Both models support 4K resolution at 30fps. It also support standard 1080p HD resolution at 30, 60, 120 or 240 fps (60, 120 and 240 supports the 5G model, the 4G model still supports 30 fps except higher frame rates from 60 to 240). The Reno 4G received a dual-front camera setup with a 44MP wide-angle 1/2.8" lens with aperture of f/2.4 and a 2MP depth sensor with an aperture of f/2.4, while the 5G model received a single 32MP wide-angle lens with aperture of f/2.0 with the same lens size. Both of them supports HDR and 1080p video recording at 30 fps.

=== Software ===
The Reno3 Pro and Reno3 Pro 5G were originally released with Android 10 with the ColorOS 7 User Interface system. It was updated to the latest version, which is Android 12 with ColorOS 12.1 UI in May 2022.
