= Oppo R7 =

Android Smartphone from Oppo

- Manufacturer: Oppo
- Type: Smartphone
- Series: OPPO R
- First released: May 20, 2015; 11 years ago
- Compatible networks: GSM 850 900 1800 1900; WCDMA 850 900 1900 2100; LTE Bands 1 3 7 8 TD-40 for International Version; LTE Bands 1 3 5 7 8 28 TD-40 for Taiwan Version; LTE Bands 1 4 7 17 for US Version
- Form factor: Phablet
- Dimensions: 143 mm (5.6 in) H 71 mm (2.8 in) W 6.3 mm (0.25 in) D
- Weight: 147 g (5.2 oz)
- Operating system: ColorOS 2.1 based on Android 4.4
- CPU: Qualcomm MSM8939 Octa-core
- GPU: Adreno 405
- Memory: 3 GB
- Storage: 16 GB
- Battery: 2320 mAh
- Rear camera: Single-Camera Setup; Samsung ISOCELL S5K3M2; 13 MP, f/2.2, 28mm (wide), FoV 75.5°, 1/3.06", 1.12 μm, PDAF; Camera features: LED flash, Panorama, HDR, Schneider-Kreuznach optics; Video recording: 1080p@30fps
- Front camera: OmniVision PureCel OV8858; 8 MP, f/2.4, 24mm (wide), FoV 84°, 1/4.0″, 1.12 μm; Video recording: 1080p@30fps
- Display: 5.0 in (130 mm) diagonal, multi-touch display, AMOLED AMOLED, 1920x1080 pixels
- Connectivity: List: Wi-Fi :802.11 b/g/n (2,4 GHz); Hotspot (Wi-Fi); GPS; Bluetooth 4.0; USB On-The-Go
- Codename: R7
- Other: Light sensor, Distance sensor, G-sensor, E-compass

The Oppo R7 is a mid-range phablet smartphone based on Android 4.4 with Oppo Electronics’ own operating system, ColorOS 2.1, which was unveiled on 20 May 2015. This model includes 3 versions featuring different frequencies, and will be sold in 6 countries all over the world, as well as third-party retailer, Oppostyle and other E-commerce platforms.

== Specifications ==
The Oppo R7 contains a Qualcomm MSM8939 Octa-core processor with 3GB of RAM, with 16 GB expandable storage, and makes use of a 5-inch, 1080p AMOLED 2.5D arc edge display. The device weighs about 147g and is composed of 92.3% metal. It also includes a 13-megapixel main camera and an 8-megapixel front camera, but phase detection autofocus and anti-shake optimization may contribute towards higher image quality. Like other flagships, the Oppo R7 is equipped with VOOC Flash Charging technology.

At present, the Oppo R7 has been officially released in Indonesia, Sri Lanka, Taiwan, Singapore and Australia.

=== Hardware ===
The Oppo R7 features a 5.0-inch AMOLED display (1080p, Gorilla Glass 3) in a slim (6.3 mm) metal body. It's powered by an octa-core Snapdragon 615 CPU with 3 GB RAM and 16 GB expandable storage. It has a 13 MP main camera (PDAF) and an 8 MP selfie camera. A non-removable 2320 mAh Li-Po battery with 20W fast charging.

== See also ==
- List of Oppo products
