= Oppo Find X =

Smartphone model released in 2018

- Brand: Oppo
- Manufacturer: Oppo Electronics Corporation
- Series: Oppo Find
- First released: 18 July 2018
- Availability by region: 19 July 2018: France; 29 June 2019: China; 30 July 2018: Taiwan; 1 August 2018: Singapore; 3 August 2018: India; 4 August 2018: Pakistan; 11 August 2018: Philippines; 29 January 2019: United Kingdom
- Predecessor: Oppo Find 7
- Successor: Oppo Find X2
- Dimensions: 156.7 mm × 74.2 mm × 9.6 mm (6.17 in × 2.92 in × 0.38 in)
- Weight: 186 g (6.6 oz)
- Operating system: Android 8.1 "Oreo" with ColorOS 5.0
- System-on-chip: Qualcomm Snapdragon 845
- CPU: Snapdragon: Octa-core (4x2.8 GHz Kryo 385 Gold & 4x1.7 GHz Kryo 385 Silver)
- GPU: Adreno 630
- Memory: 8 GB
- Storage: 256 GB, 512 GB (Lamborghini edition)
- Battery: 3,730 mAh
- Rear camera: Dual: 16 MP (f/2.0, 1/2.6", 1.22μm, PDAF, OIS) + 20 MP (f/2.0, 1/2.8", 1.0μm), phase detection autofocus, dual-LED dual-tone flash, Geo-tagging, touch focus, face detection, HDR, panorama, OIS, 4K at 60 fps, 1080p at 240 fps, 720p at 960 fps
- Front camera: 25 MP (f/2.0), portrait mode, face detection, beauty mode, palm selfie, wide Selfie, 1080p at 30 fps
- Display: 2340×1080 1080p AMOLED capacitive touchscreen with 93.8% screen to body ratio; Corning Gorilla Glass 5; 6.42 in (163 mm), 401 ppi; Aspect ratio: 19.5:9
- Sound: Vibration; MP3, WAV ringtones
- Connectivity: Wi-Fi 802.11 a/b/g/n/ac (2.4/5GHz), VHT80, MU-MIMO, 1024-QAM Bluetooth 5.0 (LE up to 2 Mbit/s), ANT+, USB-C, NFC, location (GPS, Galileo, GLONASS, BeiDou)
- Other: 2G, 3G, LTE, LTE-A
- Website: www.oppo.com/en/smartphone-find_x

The Oppo Find X is the 2018 flagship smartphone from the Oppo Find series and was launched on 19 June 2018 in Paris by Oppo. The Find X features a different design from traditional smartphones, as it has a mechanic pop-up camera. The phone has a screen to body ratio of 87%, the thinnest bezels in the market when it launched, and is considered the first "all screen" smartphone to be released.

== Specifications ==
=== Hardware ===
It is powered by Qualcomm Snapdragon 845 processor, 8 GB of RAM, 256 GB of storage and operates on Android 8.1 (Oreo) which is Color OS customised. The pop up contains both the 25 MP front camera and dual 16 + 20 MP rear cameras. It also has a 3,730 mAh battery and is powered by VOOC fast wired charging. The Lamborghini edition of the phone comes with 512 GB storage and supports SuperVOOC fast wired charging which can charge from 0 to 100% in 35 minutes. According to Oppo, Find X will be its first phone to have global LTE compatibility which is crucial for the company to enter the European and North American market, the phone supports no fingerprint scanner to unlock the device and instead relies on facial recognition known as O-Face, which is done by the pop up taking as little as 0.5 s to pop up and unlock the phone. It is the first phone to feature an entirely virtualized (software-driven) proximity sensor, as there was no space on the front face to include such a physical sensor.

The selfie camera has 3D Smart Selfie Capture that can simulate various lighting effects for portrait lighting and it has an 3D OMoji feature while the dual rear camera can recognize 800 scenes in 20 scenarios (Food, Pets, Snow, etc.).

=== Battery ===
The Oppo Find X battery configuration varies by model. The standard model has a non-removable 3730 mAh Li-Ion battery, supported by 20W wired charging. The Super Flash Edition utilizes a 3400 mAh Li-Ion battery and a 50W wired charging (SuperVOOC Flash Charge), fully recharging battery in 35 minutes.

=== Software ===
Oppo Find X ships with Android 8.1 Oreo.

== See also ==
- List of Oppo products
