= Oppo Reno =

2019 Android smartphones developed by Oppo

- Brand: Oppo
- Manufacturer: Oppo
- Type: Smartphone
- First released: Mainland China, Taiwan, Singapore: April 2019; 7 years ago (Reno); Mainland China: 10 May 2019; 7 years ago (Reno 10x Zoom); 30 May 2019; 7 years ago (Reno Z)
- Predecessor: Oppo R17; Oppo F11
- Successor: Oppo Reno2; Oppo Reno Ace
- Related: Oppo Reno A
- Dimensions: 156.6 x 74.3 x 9 mm (Reno); 157.3 x 74.9 x 9.1 mm (Reno Z); 162 x 77.2 x 9.3 mm (Reno 10x Zoom)
- Weight: 185 g (6.5 oz) (Reno); 186 g (6.6 oz) (Reno Z); 210 g (7.4 oz) (Reno 10x Zoom)
- Operating system: Android 9 Pie
- System-on-chip: Qualcomm Snapdragon 710 (Reno); MediaTek Helio P90 (Reno Z); Qualcomm Snapdragon 855 (Reno 10x Zoom)
- CPU: Octa-core (2x2.2 GHz Kryo 360 Gold & 6x1.7 GHz Kryo 360 Silver) (Reno); Octa-core (1x2.84 GHz & 3x2.42 GHz & 4x1.8 GHz Kryo 485) (Reno 10x Zoom)
- GPU: Adreno 616 (Reno); PowerVR GM9446 (Reno Z); Adreno 640 (Reno 10x Zoom)
- Memory: 6 GB or 8 GB LPDDR4X RAM
- Storage: 128 GB or 256 GB UFS 2.1
- Removable storage: None (Reno/Reno Z) microSD, up to 256 GB (Reno 10x Zoom)
- Battery: 3765 mAh (Reno); 4035 mAh (Reno Z); 4065 mAh (Reno 10x Zoom)
- Rear camera: Dual-Camera Setup; Reno (4G)/Reno Z: Primary: Sony IMX 586; 48 MP, f/1.7, 26mm, 1/2.0", 0.8μm, PDAF; Depth: Samsung ISOCELL S5K5E9; 5 MP, f/2.4, 1/5.0", 1.12μm; Triple-Camera Setup; Reno (5G)/Reno 10x zoom: Primary: Sony IMX 586; 48 MP, f/1.7, 26mm, 1/2.0", 0.8μm, PDAF, OIS; Periscope Telephoto: Samsung ISOCELL Slim S5K3M5; 13 MP, f/3.0, 130mm, 1/3.4", 1.0μm, 5x optical zoom, 10x hybrid zoom, PDAF, OIS; Ultrawide: Sony IMX 319; 8 MP, f/2.2, 16mm, 1/3.2", 1.4μm; Features: Reno (4G)/Reno Z: Dual-LED flash, HDR, panorama; Reno (5G)/Reno 10x zoom: Laser AF, Dual-LED flash, HDR, panorama; Video: Reno (4G)/Reno Z: 4K@30fps, 1080p@30/60/120fps, gyro-EIS; Reno (5G)/Reno 10x zoom: 4K@30/60fps, 1080p@30/60/240fps, gyro-EIS; video rec. only with main camera
- Front camera: Reno (4G)/(5G)/Reno 10x zoom: Sony IMX 471; Motorized pop-up Shark-fin 16 MP, f/2.0, 26mm (wide), 1/3.06", 1.0μm; Reno Z: Samsung ISOCELL S5KGD1; 32 MP, f/2.0, 26mm (wide), 1/2.8", 0.8μm; Features: Reno (4G)/Reno Z: HDR; Reno (5G)/Reno 10x zoom: LED flash, HDR; Video: All: 1080p@30fps
- Display: 6.4 in (16 cm) (Reno/Reno Z) or 6.6 in (17 cm) (Reno 10x Zoom) 1080 x 2340 FHD+ AMOLED; Gorilla Glass 6
- Connectivity: Wi-Fi (802.11 a/b/g/n/ac MIMO), GPS, A-GPS, GLONASS, BDS, NFC; USB-C; 3.5mm audio jack (Reno only)
- Data inputs: Fingerprint scanner, Accelerometer, Gyroscope, Proximity sensor, Electronic compass
- Website: www.oppo.com/en/smartphone-reno/

Oppo Reno is a line of camera-focused Android smartphones manufactured by Oppo, with Reno 10x Zoom, and Reno 5G as "flagships", and midrange models, the Reno Z and Reno. The Reno was launched on April 24, 2019. The Oppo Reno lineup was followed by the Reno2, which was launched in India on August 28, 2019, and the Reno Ace which was released in October 2019.

On, March 16, 2022, Reno7 Series was launched in the GCC region.

== History ==
Oppo previewed the 10x Zoom's camera system in February. After the announcement on 10 April 2019, Oppo also revealed a 5G variant at Swisscom's 5G network media event. It shares its battery and chipset with the 10x Zoom, costs around US$1000 and uses Qualcomm's Snapdragon X50 modem. The 5G model is also the first smartphone officially compatible with the Nreal Light AR glasses.

== Design ==
The Reno and the Reno 10x Zoom both utilize a metal/glass construction, with Gorilla Glass 6 on the front and Gorilla Glass 5 on the back. Both phones sport a distinctive wedge or fin-like pop-up camera mechanism that opens in 0.8 seconds. Oppo calls it a Pivot Rising camera, and it also houses the earpiece and flash, allowing for a full-screen display. Oppo claims that it can withstand up to 200,000 actuations before failing and will last for over 5 years, and has added fall detection to automatically close and protect the camera. The Reno Z lacks this mechanism and has a traditional selfie camera with a small notch instead. Additionally, all four have a small ceramic bump centered on the back to protect the glass from scratches. The 10x Zoom is available in black and blue finishes, while the Reno and Reno Z offer additional pink, purple, orange and white finishes. The Reno has an exclusive Inspiration Edition with drawings on the back and stickers in the retail box.

== Specifications ==
=== Hardware ===
While the regular and 10x zoom variants are similar externally, the 10x Zoom features upgraded internals. Compared to the standard Reno, the 10x Zoom uses a more powerful Snapdragon 855/Adreno 640 chipset opposed to the Snapdragon 710/Adreno 616 chipset on the normal model. Being a lower cost model, the Reno Z uses a MediaTek/PowerVR chipset instead. The 10x Zoom also has a 4065 mAh battery and a 6.6 inch screen, while the regular model has a 3765 mAh battery and a 6.4 inch screen. Some features are exclusive to one variant: the 10x Zoom lacks the audio jack found on the regular model, but has a microSD card slot. The 10x Zoom's camera is also upgraded over the standard model; it replaces the depth sensor with a periscope telephoto lens and a wide-angle lens, and offers 5x optical zoom with laser autofocus. However, only 6x hybrid zoom and 10x hybrid zoom toggles are offered in the camera viewfinder. Both have an under-display fingerprint sensor, unlike the Find X which relied on the pop-up camera for both selfies and biometric unlocking. The 10x Zoom is larger and heavier than the standard Reno as well.

Oppo also claims that the phone uses Nokia OZO audio recording technology.

=== Camera ===
The Oppo Reno has a dual rear camera system comprising a 48 MP primary sensor (f/1.7, wide) and a 5 MP depth sensor. Video recording supports up to 4K@30fps with gyro-EIS stabilization. It has a motorized pop-up mechanism for its 16 MP (f/2.0) selfie camera, which also supports HDR.

=== Software ===
Only the Chinese versions of the 10x run on Android 10 with Oppo's ColorOS 7 skin. All other phones run on Android 9.0 (Pie) with Oppo's ColorOS 6 skin.
