= Oppo Find X2 =

2020 Android-based smartphones produced by Oppo

Oppo Find X2 Oppo Find X2 Pro
- Brand: Oppo
- Manufacturer: Oppo
- Type: Phablet
- First released: 6 March 2020; 6 years ago
- Predecessor: Oppo Find X
- Successor: Oppo Find X3
- Related: OnePlus 8 Pro
- Compatible networks: 2G, 3G, 4G and 5G
- Form factor: Slate
- Dimensions: Find X2: 164.9 mm × 74.5 mm × 8 mm (6.49 in × 2.93 in × 0.31 in); Find X2 Pro: 165.2 mm × 74.4 mm × 8.8 mm–9.5 mm (6.50 in × 2.93 in × 0.35 in–0.37 in)
- Weight: Find X2: 192–209 g (6.8–7.4 oz); Find X2 Pro: 200–217 g (7.1–7.7 oz)
- Operating system: ColorOS 7.1 (based on Android 10), upgradeable to ColorOS 11 and Android 11
- System-on-chip: Qualcomm Snapdragon 865
- CPU: Octa-core (1x2.84 GHz Kryo 585 & 3x2.42 GHz Kryo 585 & 4x1.80 GHz Kryo 585)
- GPU: Qualcomm Adreno 650
- Memory: Find X2: 8 or 12 GB LPDDR5 RAM; Find X2 Pro: 12 GB LPDDR5 RAM
- Storage: Find X2: 128 GB or 256 GB UFS 3.0; Find X2 Pro: 256 GB or 512 GB UFS 3.0
- Battery: Find X2: 4200 mAh; Find X2 Pro: 4260 mAh; SuperVOOC technology
- Rear camera: Find X2: 48 MP, f/1.7, 25 mm, 1/2", 0.8 μm (wide) + 12 MP, f/2.2, 16 mm, 1/2.4" (ultrawide) + 13 MP, f/2.4, 52 mm (telephoto), 2x optical zoom, PDAF; Find X2 Pro: 48 MP, f/1.7, 25 mm, 1/1.43", 1.12 μm (wide) + 48 MP, f/2.2, 17 mm, 1/2", 0.8 μm (ultrawide) + 13 MP, f/3.0, 129 mm, 1/3.4", 1.0 μm (telephoto), 5x optical zoom, omnidirectional PDAF; Both: Laser AF, AF, OIS, gyro-EIS, dual-LED flash, Auto HDR, 4K@30/60 fps, 1080p@30/60 fps, 720p@30/60 fps
- Front camera: 32 MP, f/2.4, 1/2.8", 0.8 μm 1080p@30 fps, 720p@30 fps, HDR
- Display: AMOLED capacitive touchscreen with HDR10+ support 6.7 in (170 mm) 3168 × 1440 1440p, (513 ppi with 19.8:9 aspect ratio), 120 Hz refresh rate, 1B colors
- Sound: Dolby Atmos Dual stereo speakers with active noise cancellation
- Connectivity: Bluetooth 5.1; Wi-Fi a/b/g/n/ac/ax; A2DP, LE, aptX HD
- Data inputs: Fingerprint scanner (optical); Accelerometer; gyroscope; proximity sensor; electronic compass
- Website: oppo.com/en/smartphone-find-x2

The Oppo Find X2 and Find X2 Pro are Android-based smartphones manufactured by Oppo, unveiled on 6 March 2020.

== Specifications ==
=== Design ===
The Find X2 and Find X2 Pro are constructed using an anodized aluminum frame and curved Gorilla Glass 6 on the front. The volume buttons are located on the left side opposite the power button, which has a green accent. Oppo offers two choices of material for the back panel on both phones: the Find X2 is available with either glass or ceramic, and the Find X2 Pro is available with either ceramic or artificial leather. The leather model has a metallic plate with a vertically positioned Oppo logo in the lower-left-hand corner. Unlike the Find X, there is no pop-up camera mechanism; instead both have a circular cutout for the front-facing camera. The rear camera module houses a rectangular array above the LED flash, and protrudes slightly. The Find X2 is splash-proof with an IP54 rating, while the Find X2 Pro has full IP68 water resistance. The Find X2 has an Ocean finish for the glass model and a Black finish for the ceramic model. The Find X2 Pro likewise has a Black finish for the ceramic model, but receives unique Orange, Gray and Green color options for the leather model.

=== Hardware ===
Both the Find X2 and Find X2 Pro use the Snapdragon 865 processor with the Adreno 650 GPU. Storage is non-expandable UFS 3.0; the Find X2 has 128 or 256 GB, while the Find X2 Pro has 256 or 512 GB. The Find X2 has 8 or 12 GB of RAM, while the Find X2 Pro has 12 GB of RAM; both have LPDDR5. The display is an OLED panel with HDR10+ support, identical to the OnePlus 8 Pro's. Both use a 6.7-inch (170mm) 1440p screen with a 19.8:9 aspect ratio and a 120 Hz refresh rate. The display is also capable of showing 1 billion colors. Both have stereo speakers with active noise cancellation, and there's no audio jack. The Find X2's battery capacity is 4200 mAh, while the Find X2 Pro is marginally larger at 4260 mAh. Both smartphones support wired fast charging at 65W enabled by a dual-cell design, although wireless charging is not supported. Finally, biometric options include an optical (under-screen) fingerprint sensor and facial recognition.

==== Camera ====
The Find X2's camera array consists of a 48 MP wide sensor, a 12 MP ultrawide sensor, and a 13 MP telephoto sensor, while the Find X2 Pro's camera array consists of a 48 MP wide sensor, a 48 MP ultrawide sensor and a 13 MP telephoto sensor. The telephoto camera differs between the Find X2 and Find X2 Pro although they have the same resolution. The Find X2's sensor is a conventional lens with 2x optical zoom, whereas the Find X2 Pro's sensor is a "periscope" lens with 5x optical zoom. The Find X2's wide sensor is the Sony IMX586, while the Find X2 Pro's wide sensor is the newer Sony IMX689. The front camera on both uses a 32 MP sensor.

=== Battery ===
The Oppo Find X2 has a non-removable 4200 mAh Li-Po battery. The Oppo Find X2 Pro has a slightly larger, non-removable 4260 mAh Li-Po battery. Both models support 65W wired charging, specifically SuperVOOC 2.0 Flash Charge. The company claims it can charge either phone from 0% to 100% in 38 minutes. Both models support wireless charging.

=== Software ===
The Find X2 and Find X2 Pro run on ColorOS 7.1, which is based on Android 10.

== Reception ==
The Find X2 Pro received an overall score of 124 from DXOMARK, with a photo score of 134 and video score of 104, the third-highest ranking as of May 2020.
