= Oppo R9 =

Oppo Smartphone was release in China on 2016

OPPO R9/R9s
- Oppo R9 Commercial
- Brand: OPPO
- Manufacturer: OPPO
- Type: Smartphone
- Series: OPPO R series
- First released: March 2016
- Predecessor: OPPO R7
- Successor: OPPO R11
- Form factor: Slate
- Dimensions: 151.8×74.3×6.6 mm (5.98×2.93×0.26 in)
- Weight: 145 g (5 oz)
- Operating system: Android 5.1.1 Lollipop with ColorOS
- CPU: Octa-core MediaTek Helio P10
- Memory: 4 GB RAM
- Storage: 64 GB
- Removable storage: microSD, up to 128 GB
- Battery: 2,850 mAh
- Rear camera: 13 MP
- Front camera: 16 MP
- Display: 5.5-inch AMOLED, 1920 × 1080 pixels

OPPO R9 (global phone: Oppo F1 Plus) is an Android smartphone developed by OPPO. It was officially announced in China on 17 March 2016 alongside the larger OPPO R9 Plus. The device was positioned as a camera-focused smartphone and was marketed with emphasis on its 16-megapixel front-facing camera, slim metal body, fingerprint sensor and VOOC Flash Charge support.

== History ==
The OPPO R9 was introduced as part of OPPO's R series, succeeding the OPPO R7 lineup. The R9 and R9 Plus were launched in China in March 2016, with the R9 priced at CNY 2,799 at launch. OPPO later scheduled the India launch of the R9 and R9 Plus for 5 April 2016.

The phone was also noted by technology reviewers for its design resemblance to Apple's iPhone 6s.

== Specifications ==
=== Design ===
The OPPO R9 features a metal unibody design with a slim profile. It measures 151.8 × 74.3 × 6.6 mm and has narrow side bezels. A fingerprint sensor is integrated into the front home button.

=== Hardware ===
The smartphone is powered by the MediaTek Helio P10 octa-core processor. It includes 4 GB of RAM and 64 GB of internal storage, with support for microSD card expansion through a hybrid SIM slot.

The device is equipped with a 2,850 mAh battery and supports OPPO's VOOC Flash Charge technology.

=== Display ===
The OPPO R9 has a 5.5-inch Full HD AMOLED display with a resolution of 1920 × 1080 pixels.

=== Camera ===
The R9 includes a 16-megapixel front-facing camera and a 13-megapixel rear camera. The front camera was promoted as a major feature of the device, reflecting OPPO's focus on selfie photography in the R series.

=== Software ===
The OPPO R9 was launched with ColorOS based on Android 5.1.1 Lollipop. In 2017, OPPO released an Android Marshmallow update for the R9, R9 Plus and F1s.

== Reception ==
CNET described the OPPO R9 as a smartphone with a strong focus on selfies and design. A CNET preview also highlighted the handset's iPhone-like design and camera-focused positioning.
