= List of Redmi products =

Redmi is a subsidiary company owned by the Chinese electronics company Xiaomi. Redmi's line of products ranges from smartphones and power banks to laptops, Smart TVs, and wireless earbuds, typically sold at a price lower than Xiaomi-branded ones.

This list is made according to Chinese names if the device has multiple names. The different models of each device model have differing details for different regions, in particular supporting a different range of frequency bands. Models have code names which relate to their firmware; only firmware with the right code is compatible. For example, the Redmi 10C, Indian version of Redmi 10 and Redmi 10 Power have interchangeable firmware (fog), but are not compatible with the Redmi 10 2022 (selenes).

== Phones ==
Xiaomi Redmi K100 Pro Max

=== Redmi Series ===
Model	codename	Model number	Release date	Display type	Display size	Display resolution	5G support	SoC	GPU	RAM	Internal storage	Camera		Battery	Operating system		Colors
Model	codename	Model number	Release date	Display type	Display size	Display resolution	5G support	SoC	GPU	RAM	Internal storage	Rear	Front	Battery	Initial	Current	Colors
Redmi	HM2013023	HM2013022 HM2013023	July 2013	IPS LCD	4.7"	720 x 1280 px (HD, ~312 ppi)	No	MediaTek MT6589T 4x 1.5 GHz Cortex-A7	PowerVR SGX544 @357 MHz	1 GB (LPDDR2)	4 GB (eMMC 2.0)	8 MP, f/2.2	1.3 MP	2000 mAh (Li-Ion)	Android 4.2.2 (MIUI V5)	Android 4.4.2 (MIUI 9)	Black, Chinese Red, Metallic Gray
Redmi 1S	armani	2013028 2013029	May 2014	IPS LCD Asahi Dragontrail Glass	4.7"	720 x 1280 px (HD, ~312 ppi)	No	Qualcomm Snapdragon 400 4x 1.6 GHz Cortex-A7	Adreno 305 @400 MHz	1 GB (LPDDR3)	8 GB (eMMC 4.2)	8 MP, f/2.2	1.6 MP	2000 mAh (Li-Ion)	Android 4.3 (MIUI V5)	Android 4.4.4 (MIUI 9)	Black, Chinese Red, Metallic Gray
Redmi 1S 4G	2014501	2014011 2014012	August 2014	IPS LCD	4.7"	720 x 1280 px (HD, ~312 ppi)	No	MediaTek MT6582 4x 1.3 GHz Cortex-A7	Mali-400 MP2 @500 MHz	1 GB (LPDDR3)	8 GB (eMMC 4.2)	8 MP, f/2.2	1.6 MP	2200 mAh	Android 4.4.2 (MIUI V5)	Android 4.4.4 (MIUI 9)	Black, Chinese Red, Metallic Gray
Redmi 2		2014817; 2014818	January 2015	IPS LCD Corning Gorilla Glass 2	4.7"	720 x 1280 px (HD, ~312 ppi)	No	Qualcomm Snapdragon 410 4x 1.2 GHz Cortex-A53	Adreno 306 @450 MHz	1 GB; 2 GB (LPDDR3)	8 GB; 16 GB (eMMC 4.5)	8 MP, f/2.2	2 MP	2200 mAh (Li-Po)	Android 4.4.4 (MIUI 6)	Android 4.4.4 (MIUI 9)	Black, White, Yellow, Pink, Green
Redmi 2A	lte26007	2014502	April 2015	IPS LCD	4.7"	720 x 1280 px (HD, ~312 ppi)	No	Leadcore LC1860C 4x 1.5 GHz Cortex-A7	Mali-T628 MP2 @600 MHz	1 GB	8 GB	8 MP, f/2.2	2 MP	2200 mAh (Li-Ion)	Android 4.4.4 (MIUI 6)	Android 4.4.4 (MIUI 9)	Black, Green, Yellow, Pink
Redmi 2A Enhanced Edition	hermes	2014512 2014055	August 2015	IPS LCD	4.7"	720 x 1280 px (HD, ~312 ppi)	No	Leadcore LC1860C 4x 1.5 GHz Cortex-A7	Mali-T628 MP2 @600 MHz	2 GB (LPDDR3)	16 GB (eMMC 5.0)	8 MP, f/2.2	2 MP	2200 mAh (Li-Ion)	Android 4.4.4 (MIUI 6)	Android 4.4.4 (MIUI 9)	Black, Green, Yellow, Pink
Redmi 2 Prime	wt88047	2014818	August 2015	IPS LCD	4.7"	720 x 1280 px (HD, ~312 ppi)	No	Qualcomm Snapdragon 410 4x 1.2 GHz Cortex-A53	Adreno 306 @450 MHz	2 GB (LPDDR3)	16 GB (eMMC 5.0)	8 MP, f/2.2	2 MP	2200 mAh (Li-Po)	Android 4.4.4 (MIUI 6)	Android 5.1.1 (MIUI 9)	White, Dark Gray
Redmi 3	ido	2015810 2015812 2015811 2015815 2015816	January 2016	IPS LCD	5"	720 x 1280 px (HD, ~294 ppi)	No	Qualcomm Snapdragon 616 4x 1.7 GHz Cortex-A53 + 4x 1.2 GHz Cortex-A53	Adreno 405 @550 MHz	2 GB (LPDDR3)	16 GB (eMMC 4.5)	13 MP, f/2.0	5 MP, f/2.2	4100 mAh (Li-Ion)	Android 5.1.1 (MIUI 7)	Android 5.1.1 (MIUI 9)	Gold, Dark Gray, Silver, Classic Gold
Redmi 3 Prime	ido	2015817 2015818 2015819	January 2016	IPS LCD	5"	720 x 1280 px (HD, ~294 ppi)	No	Qualcomm Snapdragon 616 4x 1.7 GHz Cortex-A53 + 4x 1.2 GHz Cortex-A53	Adreno 405 @550 MHz	3 GB (LPDDR3)	32 GB	13 MP, f/2.0	5 MP, f/2.2	4100 mAh (Li-Ion)	Android 5.1.1 (MIUI 7)	Android 5.1.1 (MIUI 9)	Dark Gray, Silver, Gold
Redmi 3S	land	2016030 2016031 2016037	June 2016	IPS LCD	5"	720 x 1280 px (HD, ~294 ppi)	No	Qualcomm Snapdragon 430 8x 1.4 GHz Cortex-A53	Adreno 505 @450 MHz	2 GB (LPDDR3)	16 GB (eMMC 5.1)	13 MP, f/2.0	5 MP, f/2.2	4100 mAh (Li-Ion)	Android 6.0.1 (MIUI 7)	Android 6.0.1 (MIUI 10)	Dark Gray, Silver, Gold
Redmi 3X	land	2016033 2016036	July 2016	IPS LCD	5"	720 x 1280 px (HD, ~294 ppi)	No	Qualcomm Snapdragon 430 8x 1.4 GHz Cortex-A53	Adreno 505 @450 MHz	2 GB (LPDDR3)	32 GB (eMMC 5.1)	13 MP, f/2.0	5 MP, f/2.2	4100 mAh (Li-Ion)	Android 6.0.1 (MIUI 7)	Android 6.0.1 (MIUI 10)	Dark Gray, Silver, Gold
Redmi 3S Prime	land	2016032 2016037	August 2016	IPS LCD	5"	720 x 1280 px (HD, ~294 ppi)	No	Qualcomm Snapdragon 430 8x 1.4 GHz Cortex-A53	Adreno 505 @450 MHz	3 GB (LPDDR3)	32 GB (eMMC 5.1)	13 MP, f/2.0	5 MP, f/2.2	4100 mAh (Li-Ion)	Android 6.0.1 (MIUI 7)	Android 6.0.1 (MIUI 10)	Dark Gray, Silver, Gold
Redmi Pro	omega	2016020 2016021	August 2016	AMOLED	5.5"	1080 x 1920 px (Full HD, ~401 ppi)	No	MediaTek Helio X20 / Helio X25 Helio x20: 2x 2.1 GHz Cortex-A72 + 4x 1.85 GHz Cortex-A53 + 4x 1.4 GHz Cortex-A53 Helio x25: 2x 2.5 GHz Cortex-A72 + 4x 2.0 GHz Cortex-A53 + 4x 1.55 GHz Cortex-A53	Mali-T880 MP4 @780 MHz (x20) @850 MHz (x25)	3 GB; 4 GB (LPDDR3)	32 GB; 64 GB; 128 GB (eMMC 5.1)	13 MP, f/2.0 + 5 MP, f/2.4 (depth)	5 MP, f/2.0	4050 mAh (Li-Ion)	Android 6.0.1 (MIUI 8)	Android 6.0.1 (MIUI 10)	Silver, Gold, Gray
Redmi 4A	rolex	2016111 2016112 2016116 2016117	November 2016	IPS LCD	5"	720 x 1280 px (HD, ~296 ppi)	No	Qualcomm Snapdragon 425 4x 1.4 GHz Cortex-A53	Adreno 308 @500 MHz	2 GB; 3 GB (LPDDR3)	16 GB; 32 GB (eMMC 5.1)	13 MP, f/2.2	5 MP, f/2.2	3120 mAh (Li-Ion)	Android 6.0.1 (MIUI 8)	Android 6.0.1 (MIUI 10)	Gold, Rose Gold, Dark Gray
Redmi 4	prada	2016090	November 2016	IPS LCD	5"	720 x 1280 px (HD, ~296 ppi)	No	Qualcomm Snapdragon 430 8x 1.4 GHz Cortex-A53	Adreno 505 @450 MHz	2 GB (LPDDR3)	16 GB (eMMC 5.1)	13 MP, f/2.2	5 MP, f/2.2	4100 mAh (Li-Po)	Android 6.0.1 (MIUI 8)	Android 6.0.1 (MIUI 10)	Gold, Dark Gray, Silver
Redmi 4 Pro/Prime	markw	2016060	November 2016	IPS LCD	5"	1080 x 1920 px (Full HD, ~441 ppi)	No	Qualcomm Snapdragon 625 8x 2.0 GHz Cortex-A53	Adreno 506 @650 MHz	3 GB (LPDDR3)	32 GB (eMMC 5.1)	13 MP, f/2.2	5 MP, f/2.2	4100 mAh (Li-Po)	Android 6.0.1 (MIUI 8)	Android 6.0.1 (MIUI 10)	Gold, Dark Gray, Silver
Redmi 4X	santoni	MAG138 MAE136 MAT136	March 2017	IPS LCD Corning Gorilla Glass	5"	720 x 1280 px (HD, ~294 ppi)	No	Qualcomm Snapdragon 435 8x 1.4 GHz Cortex-A53	Adreno 505 @450 MHz	2 GB; 3 GB; 4 GB (LPDDR3)	16 GB; 32 GB; 64 GB (eMMC 5.1)	13 MP, f/2.0	5 MP, f/2.2	4100 mAh (Li-Po)	Android 6.0.1 (MIUI 8)	Android 7.1.2 (MIUI 11)	Gold, Rose Gold, Black
Redmi 4 (India)	santoni	MAI132	May 2017	IPS LCD Corning Gorilla Glass	5"	720 x 1280 px (HD, ~294 ppi)	No	Qualcomm Snapdragon 435 8x 1.4 GHz Cortex-A53	Adreno 505 @450 MHz	2 GB; 3 GB; 4 GB (LPDDR3)	16 GB; 32 GB; 64 GB (eMMC 5.1)	13 MP, f/2.0	5 MP, f/2.2	4100 mAh (Li-Po)	Android 6.0.1 (MIUI 8)	Android 7.1.2 (MIUI 11)	Gold, Rose Gold, Black
Redmi 5A	riva	MCE3B MCG3B MCI3B MCT3B	December 2017	IPS LCD	5"	720 x 1280 px (HD, ~296 ppi)	No	Qualcomm Snapdragon 425 4x 1.4 GHz Cortex-A53	Adreno 308 @500 MHz	2 GB; 3 GB (LPDDR3)	16 GB; 32 GB (eMMC 5.1)	13 MP, f/2.2	5 MP	3000 mAh (Li-Ion)	Android 7.1.2 (MIUI 9)	Android 8.1 (MIUI 11)	Gold, Dark Gray, Rose Gold, Blue
Redmi 5	rosy	MDE1 MDG1; MDI1 MDT1	December 2017	IPS LCD Corning Gorilla Glass	5.7"	720 x 1440 px (HD+, ~282 ppi)	No	Qualcomm Snapdragon 450 8x 1.8 GHz Cortex-A53	Adreno 506 @600 MHz	2 GB; 3 GB; 4 GB (LPDDR3)	16 GB; 32 GB; 64 GB (eMMC 5.1)	12 MP, f/2.2	5 MP	3300 mAh (Li-Po)	Android 7.1.2 (MIUI 9)	Android 8.1 (MIUI 11)	Black, Gold, Blue, Rose Gold
Redmi 5 Plus; India: Redmi Note 5	vince	MEE7 MEG7 MET7	February 2018	IPS LCD Corning Gorilla Glass	5.99"	1080 x 2160 px (Full HD+, ~403 ppi)	No	Qualcomm Snapdragon 625 8x 2.0 GHz Cortex-A53	Adreno 506 @650 MHz	3 GB; 4 GB (LPDDR3)	32 GB; 64 GB (eMMC 5.1)	12 MP, f/2.2	5 MP	4000 mAh (Li-Po)	Android 7.1.2 (MIUI 9)	Android 8.1 (MIUI 11)	Black, Gold, Blue, Rose Gold
Redmi S2	ysl	M1803E6C M1803E6E M1803E6G; M1803E6H M1803E6T	May 2018	IPS LCD	5.99"	720 x 1440 px (HD+, ~269 ppi)	No	Qualcomm Snapdragon 625 8x 2.0 GHz Cortex-A53	Adreno 506 @650 MHz	3 GB; 4 GB (LPDDR3)	32 GB; 64 GB (eMMC 5.1)	12 MP, f/2.2 + 5 MP, f/2.4 (depth)	16 MP, f/2.0	3080 mAh (Li-Po)	Android 8.1 (MIUI 9)	Android 9 (MIUI 12)	Gray, Gold, Rose Gold, Mesmerising Blue, Stunning Black
Redmi Y2	ysl	M1803E6I	May 2018	IPS LCD	5.99"	720 x 1440 px (HD+, ~269 ppi)	No	Qualcomm Snapdragon 625 8x 2.0 GHz Cortex-A53	Adreno 506 @650 MHz	3 GB; 4 GB (LPDDR3)	32 GB; 64 GB (eMMC 5.1)	12 MP, f/2.2 + 5 MP, f/2.4 (depth)	16 MP, f/2.0	3080 mAh (Li-Po)	Android 8.1 (MIUI 9)	Android 9 (MIUI 12)	Gray, Gold, Rose Gold, Mesmerising Blue, Stunning Black
Redmi 6	cereus	M1804C3DC M1804C3DE M1804C3DG; M1804C3DH; M1804C3DI M1804C3DT	June 2018	IPS LCD	5.45"	720 x 1440 px (HD+, ~295 ppi)	No	MediaTek Helio P22 8x 2.0 GHz Cortex-A53	PowerVR GE8320 @650 MHz	3 GB; 4 GB (LPDDR3)	32 GB; 64 GB (eMMC 5.1)	12 MP, f/2.2 + 5 MP, f/2.2 (depth)	5 MP	3000 mAh (Li-Po)	Android 8.1 (MIUI 9)	Android 9 (MIUI 11) (MIUI 12 China)	Black, Grey, Blue, Gold, Rose Gold
Redmi 6A	cactus	M1804C3CC M1804C3CE M1804C3CG; M1804C3CH; M1804C3CI M1804C3CT	June 2018	IPS LCD	5.45"	720 x 1440 px (HD+, ~295 ppi)	No	MediaTek Helio A22 4x 2.0 GHz Cortex-A53	PowerVR GE8320 @650 MHz	2 GB; 3 GB (LPDDR3)	16 GB; 32 GB (eMMC 5.1)	13 MP, f/2.2	5 MP	3000 mAh (Li-Ion)	Android 8.1 (MIUI 9)	Android 9 (MIUI 11) (MIUI 12 China)	Black, Grey, Blue, Gold, Rose Gold
Redmi 6 Pro; Global: Xiaomi Mi A2 Lite	sakura	M1805D1SC M1805D1SE M1805D1ST	June 2018	IPS LCD	5.84"	1080 x 2280 px (Full HD+, ~432 ppi)	No	Qualcomm Snapdragon 625 8x 2.0 GHz Cortex-A53	Adreno 506 @650 MHz	3 GB; 4 GB (LPDDR3)	32 GB; 64 GB (eMMC 5.1)	12 MP, f/2.2 + 5 MP, f/2.2 (depth)	5 MP	4000 mAh (Li-Po)	Android 8.1 (MIUI 9)	Android 9 (MIUI 12)	Black, Blue, Gold, Rose Gold, Red
Redmi 6 Pro; Global: Xiaomi Mi A2 Lite	sakurain	M1805D1SI	June 2018	IPS LCD	5.84"	1080 x 2280 px (Full HD+, ~432 ppi)	No	Qualcomm Snapdragon 625 8x 2.0 GHz Cortex-A53	Adreno 506 @650 MHz	3 GB; 4 GB (LPDDR3)	32 GB; 64 GB (eMMC 5.1)	12 MP, f/2.2 + 5 MP, f/2.2 (depth)	5 MP	4000 mAh (Li-Po)	Android 8.1 (MIUI 9)	Android 9 (MIUI 12)	Black, Blue, Gold, Rose Gold, Red
Redmi Go	tiare	M1903C3GG; M1903C3GH; M1903C3GI	February 2019	IPS LCD	5.0"	720 x 1440 px (HD+, ~296 ppi)	No	Qualcomm Snapdragon 425 4x 1.4 GHz Cortex-A53	Adreno 308 @500 MHz	1 GB (LPDDR3)	8 GB; 16 GB (eMMC 5.1)	8 MP, f/2.0	5 MP, f/2.2	3000 mAh (Li-Ion)	Android 8.1 Go Edition		Black, Blue
Redmi 7	onclite	M1810F6LG; M1810F6LH; M1810F6LI	March 2019	IPS LCD Corning Gorilla Glass 5	6.26"	720 x 1520 px (HD+, ~269 ppi)	No	Qualcomm Snapdragon 632 8x 1.8 GHz Cortex-A73 / Cortex-A53	Adreno 506 @650 MHz	2 GB; 3 GB; 4 GB (LPDDR3)	16 GB; 32 GB; 64 GB (eMMC 5.1)	12 MP, f/2.2 + 2 MP (depth)	8 MP, f/2.0	4000 mAh (Li-Po)	Android 9 (MIUI 10)	Android 10 (MIUI 12.5)	Lunar Red, Eclipse Black, Comet Blue
Redmi Y3	onc	M1810F6I	April 2019	IPS LCD Corning Gorilla Glass 5	6.26"	720 x 1520 px (HD+, ~269 ppi)	No	Qualcomm Snapdragon 632 8x 1.8 GHz Cortex-A73 / Cortex-A53	Adreno 506 @650 MHz	3 GB; 4 GB (LPDDR3)	32 GB; 64 GB (eMMC 5.1)	12 MP, f/2.2 + 2 MP (depth)	32 MP, f/2.2	4000 mAh (Li-Po)	Android 9 (MIUI 10)	Android 10 (MIUI 11)	Elegant Blue, Bold Red, Prime Black
Redmi 7A	pine	MZB7995IN; M1903C3EG; M1903C3EH; M1903C3EI	June 2019	IPS LCD	5.45"	720 x 1440 px (HD+, ~295 ppi)	No	Qualcomm Snapdragon 439 4x 2.0 GHz Cortex-A53 + 4x 1.45 GHz Cortex-A53	Adreno 505 @450 MHz	2 GB; 3 GB (LPDDR3)	16 GB; 32 GB (eMMC 5.1)	13 MP, f/2.2 China 12 MP, f/2.2 Global, India	5 MP, f/2.2	4000 mAh (Li-Po)	Android 9 (MIUI 10)	Android 10 (MIUI 12.5)	Matte Black, Morning blue, Matte Blue, Matte Gold, Gem Red, Gem Blue
Redmi 8A	olivelite	M1908C3KE M1908C3 kg M1908C3KH M1908C3KI MZB8458IN	September 2019	IPS LCD Corning Gorilla Glass 5	6.22"	720 x 1520 px (HD+, ~270 ppi)	No	Qualcomm Snapdragon 439 4x 2.0 GHz Cortex-A53 + 4x 1.45 GHz Cortex-A53	Adreno 505 @450 MHz	2 GB; 3 GB; 4 GB (LPDDR3)	32 GB; 64 GB (eMMC 5.1)	12 MP, f/1.8	8 MP, f/2.0	5000 mAh (Li-Po)	Android 9 (MIUI 10)	Android 10 (MIUI 12.5)	Midnight Black, Ocean Blue, Sunset Red
Redmi 8	olive	M1908C3IC M1908C3IE M1908C3IG M1908C3IH M1908C3II MZB8255IN	October 2019	IPS LCD Corning Gorilla Glass 5	6.22"	720 x 1520 px (HD+, ~270 ppi)	No	Qualcomm Snapdragon 439 4x 2.0 GHz Cortex-A53 + 4x 1.45 GHz Cortex-A53	Adreno 505 @450 MHz	3 GB; 4 GB (LPDDR3)	32 GB; 64 GB (eMMC 5.1)	12 MP, f/1.8 + 2 MP (depth)	8 MP, f/2.0	5000 mAh (Li-Po)	Android 9 (MIUI 10)	Android 10 (MIUI 12.5)	Onyx Black, Ruby Red, Sapphire Blue, Phantom Red
Redmi 8A Dual Indonesia: Redmi 8A Pro	olivewood	M2003C3K3I	February 2020	IPS LCD Corning Gorilla Glass 5	6.22"	720 x 1520 px (HD+, ~270 ppi)	No	Qualcomm Snapdragon 439 4x 2.0 GHz Cortex-A53 + 4x 1.45 GHz Cortex-A53	Adreno 505 @450 MHz	2 GB; 3 GB (LPDDR3)	32 GB; 64 GB (eMMC 5.1)	13 MP, f/2.2 2 MP, f/2.4 (depth)	8 MP, f/2.0	5000 mAh (Li-Po)	Android 9 (MIUI 10)	Android 10 (MIUI 12.5)	Sky White, Sea Blue, Midnight Grey
Redmi 9 India: POCO M2	lancelot	M2004J19G; M2004J19C	June 2020	IPS LCD Corning Gorilla Glass 3	6.53"	1080 x 2340 px (Full HD+, ~395 ppi)	No	MediaTek Helio G80 2x 2.0 GHz Cortex-A75 + 6x 1.8 GHz Cortex-A55	Mali-G52 MC2 @950 MHz	3 GB; 4 GB; 6 GB (LPDDR4X)	32 GB; 64 GB; 128 GB (eMMC 5.1)	13 MP, f/2.2 + 8 MP, f/2.2 (ultrawide) + 5 MP, f/2.4 (macro) + 2 MP, f/2.4 (depth)	8 MP, f/2.0	5020 mAh (Li-Po)	Android 10 (MIUI 11)	Android 12 (MIUI 13)	Carbon Gray, Sunset Purple, Ocean Green, Pink/Blue
Redmi 9 India: POCO M2	galahad	M2004J19AG	June 2020	IPS LCD Corning Gorilla Glass 3	6.53"	1080 x 2340 px (Full HD+, ~395 ppi)	No	MediaTek Helio G80 2x 2.0 GHz Cortex-A75 + 6x 1.8 GHz Cortex-A55	Mali-G52 MC2 @950 MHz	3 GB; 4 GB; 6 GB (LPDDR4X)	32 GB; 64 GB; 128 GB (eMMC 5.1)	13 MP, f/2.2 + 8 MP, f/2.2 (ultrawide) + 5 MP, f/2.4 (macro) + 2 MP, f/2.4 (depth)	8 MP, f/2.0	5020 mAh (Li-Po)	Android 10 (MIUI 11)	Android 12 (MIUI 13)	Carbon Gray, Sunset Purple, Ocean Green, Pink/Blue
Redmi 9A	dandelion	M2006C3LG; M2006C3LI; M2006C3LC	July 2020	IPS LCD	6.53"	720 x 1600 px (HD+, ~269 ppi)	No	MediaTek Helio G25 4x 2.0 GHz Cortex-A53 + 4x 1.5 GHz Cortex-A53	PowerVR GE8320 @650 MHz	2 GB; 3 GB; 4 GB; 6 GB (LPDDR4X)	32 GB; 64 GB; 128 GB (eMMC 5.1)	13 MP f/2.2	5 MP, f/2.2	5000 mAh (Li-Po)	Android 10 (MIUI 12)	Android 11 (MIUI 12.5)	Carbon Grey / Midnight Black), Sky Blue / Sea Blue, Ocean Green / Nature Green
Redmi 9 Prime	lancelot	M2004J19PI	August 2020	IPS LCD Corning Gorilla Glass 3	6.53"	1080 x 2340 px (Full HD+, ~395 ppi)	No	MediaTek Helio G80 2x 2.0 GHz Cortex-A75 + 6x 1.8 GHz Cortex-A55	Mali-G52 MC2 @950 MHz	4 GB (LPDDR4X)	64 GB; 128 GB (eMMC 5.1)	13 MP, f/2.2 + 8 MP, f/2.2 (ultrawide) + 5 MP, f/2.4 (macro) + 2 MP, f/2.4 (depth)	8 MP, f/2.0	5020 mAh (Li-Po)	Android 10 (MIUI 11)	Android 12 (MIUI 13)	Space Blue, Mint Green, Matte Black, Sunrise Flare
Redmi 9C India: POCO C31	angelica	M2006C3MG; M2006C3MT	August 2020	IPS LCD	6.53"	720 x 1600 px (HD+, ~269 ppi)	No	MediaTek Helio G35 4x 2.3 GHz Cortex-A53 + 4x 1.8 GHz Cortex-A53	PowerVR GE8320 @650 MHz	2 GB; 3 GB; 4 GB (LPDDR4X)	32 GB; 64 GB (eMMC 5.1)	13 MP, f/2.2 + 2 MP, f/2.4 (macro) + 2 MP, f/2.4 (depth)	5 MP, f/2.2	5000 mAh (Li-Po)	Android 10 (MIUI 12)	Android 10 (MIUI 12)	Midnight Grey, Sunrise Orange, Twilight Blue
Redmi 9C NFC	angelican	M2006C3MNG	August 2020	IPS LCD	6.53"	720 x 1600 px (HD+, ~269 ppi)	No	MediaTek Helio G35 4x 2.3 GHz Cortex-A53 + 4x 1.8 GHz Cortex-A53	PowerVR GE8320 @650 MHz	2 GB; 3 GB (LPDDR4X)	32 GB; 64 GB (eMMC 5.1)	13 MP, f/2.2 + 2 MP, f/2.4 (macro)	5 MP, f/2.2	5000 mAh (Li-Po)	Android 10 (MIUI 12)	Android 11 (MIUI 12.5)	Midnight Grey, Sunrise Orange, Twilight Blue
Redmi 9 (India)	cattail	M2004C3MI	August 2020	IPS LCD	6.53"	720 x 1600 px (HD+, ~269 ppi)	No	MediaTek Helio G35 4x 2.3 GHz Cortex-A53 + 4x 1.8 GHz Cortex-A53	PowerVR GE8320 @650 MHz	4 GB (LPDDR4X)	64 GB; 128 GB (eMMC 5.1)	13 MP, f/2.2 + 2 MP, f/2.4 (depth)	5 MP, f/2.2	5000 mAh (Li-Po)	Android 10 (MIUI 12)	Android 10 (MIUI 12)	Carbon Black, Sky Blue, Sporty Orange
Redmi 9AT	dandelion	M2006C3LVG	September 2020	IPS LCD	6.53"	720 x 1600 px (HD+, ~269 ppi)	No	MediaTek Helio G25 4x 2.0 GHz Cortex-A53 + 4x 1.5 GHz Cortex-A53	PowerVR GE8320 @650 MHz	2 GB (LPDDR4X)	32 GB (eMMC 5.1)	13 MP, f/2.2	5 MP, f/2.2	5000 mAh (Li-Po)	Android 10 (MIUI 12)	Android 10 (MIUI 12)	Carbon Gray, Sky Blue, Ocean Green
Redmi 9i	dandelion	M2006C3LII	September 2020	IPS LCD	6.53"	720 x 1600 px (HD+, ~269 ppi)	No	MediaTek Helio G25 4x 2.0 GHz Cortex-A53 + 4x 1.5 GHz Cortex-A53	PowerVR GE8320 @650 MHz	4 GB (LPDDR4X)	64 GB; 128 GB (eMMC 5.1)	13 MP, f/2.2	5 MP, f/2.2	5000 mAh (Li-Po)	Android 10 (MIUI 12)	Android 10 (MIUI 12)	Midnight Black, Sea Blue, Nature Green
Redmi 9 Power Global: Redmi 9T China: Redmi Note 9 4G	lime	M2010J19SI	December 2020	IPS LCD Corning Gorilla Glass 3	6.53"	1080 x 2340 px (Full HD+, ~395 ppi)	No	Qualcomm Snapdragon 662 4x 2.0 GHz Cortex-A73 + 4x 1.8 GHz Cortex-A53	Adreno 610 @750 MHz	4 GB; 6 GB (LPDDR4X)	64 GB; 128 GB UFS 2.1 (64 GB); UFS 2.2 (128 GB)	48 MP, f/1.8 + 8 MP, f/2.2 (ultrawide) + 2 MP, f/2.4 (macro) + 2 MP, f/2.4 (depth)	8 MP, f/2.0	6000 mAh (Li-Po)	Android 10 (MIUI 12)	Android 12 (MIUI 14)	Mighty Black, Fiery Red, Electric Green, Blazing Blue
Redmi 9T China: Redmi Note 9 4G India: Redmi 9 Power	lime	M2010J19SG (Global) M2010J19SR (Japan); M2010J19ST (Thailand)	January 2021	IPS LCD Corning Gorilla Glass 3	6.53"	1080 x 2340 px (Full HD+, ~395 ppi)	No	Qualcomm Snapdragon 662 4x 2.0 GHz Cortex-A73 + 4x 1.8 GHz Cortex-A53	Adreno 610 @750 MHz	4 GB; 6 GB (LPDDR4X)	64 GB; 128 GB UFS 2.1 (64 GB); UFS 2.2 (128 GB)	48 MP, f/1.8 + 8 MP, f/2.2 (ultrawide) + 2 MP, f/2.4 (macro) + 2 MP, f/2.4 (depth)	8 MP, f/2.1	6000 mAh (Li-Po)	Android 10 (MIUI 12)	Android 12 (MIUI 14)	Carbon Gray, Twilight Blue, Sunrise Orange, Ocean Green
Redmi 9T China: Redmi Note 9 4G India: Redmi 9 Power	lemon	M2010J19SY (NFC)	January 2021	IPS LCD Corning Gorilla Glass 3	6.53"	1080 x 2340 px (Full HD+, ~395 ppi)	No	Qualcomm Snapdragon 662 4x 2.0 GHz Cortex-A73 + 4x 1.8 GHz Cortex-A53	Adreno 610 @750 MHz	4 GB; 6 GB (LPDDR4X)	64 GB; 128 GB UFS 2.1 (64 GB); UFS 2.2 (128 GB)	48 MP, f/1.8 + 8 MP, f/2.2 (ultrawide) + 2 MP, f/2.4 (macro) + 2 MP, f/2.4 (depth)	8 MP, f/2.1	6000 mAh (Li-Po)	Android 10 (MIUI 12)	Android 12 (MIUI 14)	Carbon Gray, Twilight Blue, Sunrise Orange, Ocean Green
Redmi 9T China: Redmi Note 9 4G India: Redmi 9 Power	pomelo	M2010J19SL (Latin America)	January 2021	IPS LCD Corning Gorilla Glass 3	6.53"	1080 x 2340 px (Full HD+, ~395 ppi)	No	Qualcomm Snapdragon 662 4x 2.0 GHz Cortex-A73 + 4x 1.8 GHz Cortex-A53	Adreno 610 @750 MHz	4 GB; 6 GB (LPDDR4X)	64 GB; 128 GB UFS 2.1 (64 GB); UFS 2.2 (128 GB)	48 MP, f/1.8 + 8 MP, f/2.2 (ultrawide) + 2 MP, f/2.4 (macro) + 2 MP, f/2.4 (depth)	8 MP, f/2.1	6000 mAh (Li-Po)	Android 10 (MIUI 12)	Android 12 (MIUI 14)	Carbon Gray, Twilight Blue, Sunrise Orange, Ocean Green
Redmi 9A Sport	dandelion	M2006C3LI	September 2021	IPS LCD	6.53"	720 x 1600 (HD+, ~269 ppi)	No	MediaTek Helio G25 4x 2.0 GHz Cortex-A53 + 4x 1.5 GHz Cortex-A53	PowerVR GE8320 @650 MHz	2 GB; 3 GB	32 GB (eMMC 5.1)	13 MP, f/2.2	5 MP, f/2.2	5000 mAh (Li-Po)	Android 10 (MIUI 12)	Android 10 (MIUI 12)	Carbon Black, Coral Green, Metallic Blue
Redmi 9i Sport	dandelion	M2006C3LII	September 2021	IPS LCD	6.53"	720 x 1600 (HD+, ~269 ppi)	No	MediaTek Helio G25 4x 2.0 GHz Cortex-A53 + 4x 1.5 GHz Cortex-A53	PowerVR GE8320 @650 MHz	4 GB	64 GB; 128 GB (eMMC 5.1)	13 MP, f/2.2	5 MP, f/2.2	5000 mAh (Li-Po)	Android 10 (MIUI 12)	Android 10 (MIUI 12)	Carbon Black, Coral Green, Metallic Blue
Redmi 9 Activ	cattail	M2004C3MII	September 2021	IPS LCD	6.53"	720 x 1600 (HD+, ~269 ppi)	No	MediaTek Helio G25 4x 2.0 GHz Cortex-A53 + 4x 1.5 GHz Cortex-A53	MediaTek Helio G35 4x 2.3 GHz Cortex-A53 + 4x 1.8 GHz Cortex-A53	4 GB; 6 GB	64 GB; 128 GB (eMMC 5.1)	13 MP, f/2.2 + 2 MP, f/2.4 (depth)	5 MP, f/2.2	5000 mAh (Li-Po)	Android 10 (MIUI 12)	Android 10 (MIUI 12)	Carbon Black, Coral Green, Metallic Purple
Redmi 10X 4G	merlin	M2003J15SC	May 2020	IPS LCD Corning Gorilla Glass 5	6.53"	1080 x 2340 px (Full HD+, ~395 ppi)	No	MediaTek Helio G85 2x 2.0 GHz Cortex-A75 + 6x 1.8 GHz Cortex-A55	Mali-G52 MC2 @1 GHz	4 GB; 6 GB (LPDDR4X)	128 GB	48 MP, f/1.8 + 8 MP, f/2.2 (ultrawide) + 2 MP, f/2.4 (macro) + 2 MP, f/2.4 (depth)	13 MP, f/2.3	5020 mAh (Li-Po)	Android 10 (MIUI 11)	Android 12 (MIUI 13)	Blue, Green, White
Redmi 10X 5G	atom	2004J7AC	June 2020	AMOLED Corning Gorilla Glass 5	6.57"	1080 x 2400 px (Full HD+, ~401 ppi)	Yes	MediaTek Dimensity 820 4x 2.6 GHz Cortex-A76 + 4x 2.0 GHz Cortex-A55	Mali-G57 MC5 @650 MHz	6 GB; 8 GB (LPDDR4X)	64 GB; 128 GB; 256 GB (UFS 2.1)	48 MP, f/1.8 + 8 MP, f/2.2 (ultrawide) + 2 MP, f/2.4 (depth)	16 MP, f/2.3	4520 mAh (Li-Po)	Android 10 (MIUI 11)	Android 12 (MIUI 13)	Blue, Gold, Pink/Blue
Redmi 10X Pro 5G	bomb	M2004J7BC	June 2020	AMOLED Corning Gorilla Glass 5	6.57"	1080 x 2400 px (Full HD+, ~401 ppi)	Yes	MediaTek Dimensity 820 4x 2.6 GHz Cortex-A76 + 4x 2.0 GHz Cortex-A55	Mali-G57 MC5 @650 MHz	8 GB (LPDDR4X)	128 GB; 256 GB (UFS 2.1)	48 MP, f/1.8 8 MP (telephoto) + 8 MP, f/2.2 (ultrawide) + 5 MP, f/2.4 (macro)	20 MP	4520 mAh (Li-Po)	Android 10 (MIUI 11)	Android 12 (MIUI 13)	Blue, Gold, Pink/Blue
Redmi 10 2021	selene	21061119AG; 21061119DG (NFC); 21061119AL	August 2021	IPS LCD, 90 Hz Corning Gorilla Glass 3	6.5"	1080 x 2400 px (Full HD+, ~405 ppi)	No	MediaTek Helio G88 2x 2.0 GHz Cortex-A75 + 6x 1.8 GHz Cortex-A55	Mali-G52 MC2 @1 GHz	4 GB; 6 GB (LPDDR4X)	64 GB; 128 GB (eMMC 5.1)	50 MP, f/1.8 + 8 MP, f/2.2 (ultrawide) + 2 MP, f/2.4 (macro) + 2 MP, f/2.4 (depth)	8 MP, f/2.0	5000 mAh (Li-Po)	Android 11 (MIUI 12.5)	Android 13 (MIUI 14)	Carbon Gray, Pebble White, Sea Blue
Redmi 10 Prime	selene	21061119BI	September 2021	IPS LCD, 90 Hz Corning Gorilla Glass 3	6.5"	1080 x 2400 px (Full HD+, ~405 ppi)	No	MediaTek Helio G88 2x 2.0 GHz Cortex-A75 + 6x 1.8 GHz Cortex-A55	Mali-G52 MC2 @1 GHz	4 GB; 6 GB (LPDDR4X)	64 GB; 128 GB (eMMC 5.1)	50 MP, f/1.8 + 8 MP, f/2.2 (ultrawide) + 2 MP, f/2.4 (macro) + 2 MP, f/2.4 (depth)	8 MP, f/2.0	6000 mAh (Li-Po)	Android 11 (MIUI 12.5)	Android 13 (MIUI 14)	Astral White, Bifrost Blue, Phantom Black
Redmi 10C	rain	220333QNY (NFC)	March 2022	IPS LCD Corning Gorilla Glass 3	6.71"	720 x 1650 px (HD+, ~268 ppi)	No	Qualcomm Snapdragon 680 4x 2.4 GHz Cortex-A73 + 4x 1.9 GHz Cortex-A55	Adreno 610	4 GB (LPDDR4X)	64 GB; 128 GB (UFS 2.2)	50 MP, f/1.8 + 2 MP, f/2.4 (depth)	5 MP, f/2.2	5000 mAh (Li-Po)	Android 11 (MIUI 13)	Android 13 (MIUI 14)	Graphite Gray, Mint Green, Ocean Blue
Redmi 10C	wind	220333QL	March 2022	IPS LCD Corning Gorilla Glass 3	6.71"	720 x 1650 px (HD+, ~268 ppi)	No	Qualcomm Snapdragon 680 4x 2.4 GHz Cortex-A73 + 4x 1.9 GHz Cortex-A55	Adreno 610	4 GB (LPDDR4X)	64 GB; 128 GB (UFS 2.2)	50 MP, f/1.8 + 2 MP, f/2.4 (depth)	5 MP, f/2.2	5000 mAh (Li-Po)	Android 11 (MIUI 13)	Android 13 (MIUI 14)	Graphite Gray, Mint Green, Ocean Blue
Redmi 10C	fog	220333QAG	March 2022	IPS LCD Corning Gorilla Glass 3	6.71"	720 x 1650 px (HD+, ~268 ppi)	No	Qualcomm Snapdragon 680 4x 2.4 GHz Cortex-A73 + 4x 1.9 GHz Cortex-A55	Adreno 610	4 GB (LPDDR4X)	64 GB; 128 GB (UFS 2.2)	50 MP, f/1.8 + 2 MP, f/2.4 (depth)	5 MP, f/2.2	5000 mAh (Li-Po)	Android 11 (MIUI 13)	Android 13 (MIUI 14)	Graphite Gray, Mint Green, Ocean Blue
Redmi 10 (India)	fog	220333QBI	March 2022	IPS LCD Corning Gorilla Glass 3	6.7"	720 x 1650 px (HD+, ~269 ppi)	No	Qualcomm Snapdragon 680 4x 2.4 GHz Cortex-A73 + 4x 1.9 GHz Cortex-A55	Adreno 610	4 GB; 6 GB (LPDDR4X)	64 GB; 128 GB (UFS 2.2)	50 MP, f/1.8 + 2 MP, f/2.4 (depth)	5 MP, f/2.2	6000 mAh (Li-Po)	Android 11 (MIUI 13)	Android 13 (MIUI 14)	Midnight Black, Pacific Blue, Caribbean Green
Redmi 10A	dandelion	220233L2C; 220233L2G; 220233L2I	March 2022	IPS LCD	6.53"	720 x 1600 px (HD+, ~269 ppi)	No	MediaTek Helio G25 4x 2.0 GHz Cortex-A53 + 4x 1.5 GHz Cortex-A53	PowerVR GE8320 @650 MHz	2 GB; 3 GB; 4 GB; 6 GB (LPDDR4X)	64 GB; 128 GB (eMMC 5.1)	13 MP, f/2.2 (China/India) 13 MP, f/2.2 + 2 MP, f/2.4 (depth) (Global)	5 MP, f/2.2	5000 mAh (Li-Po)	Android 11 (MIUI 12.5)	Android 11 (MIUI 12.5)	Charcoal Black, Sea Blue, Slate Grey
Redmi 10 Power	fog	220333QAI	April 2022	IPS LCD Corning Gorilla Glass 3	6.7"	720 x 1600 px (HD+, ~262 ppi)	No	Qualcomm Snapdragon 680 4x 2.4 GHz Cortex-A73 + 4x 1.9 GHz Cortex-A53	Adreno 610	8 GB (LPDDR4X)	128 GB (UFS 2.2)	50 MP, f/1.8 + 2 MP, f/2.4 (depth)	5 MP, f/2.2	6000 mAh (Li-Po)	Android 11 (MIUI 13)	Android 13 (MIUI 14)	Power Black, Sporty Orange
Redmi 10 2022	selenes	21121119SG; 22011119UY 22011119VL	May 2022	IPS LCD, 90 Hz Corning Gorilla Glass 3	6.5"	1080 x 2400 px (Full HD+, ~405 ppi)	No	MediaTek Helio G88 2x 2.0 GHz Cortex-A75 + 6x 1.8 GHz Cortex-A55	Mali-G52 MC2 @1 GHz	4 GB; 6 GB (LPDDR4X)	64 GB; 128 GB (eMMC 5.1)	50 MP, f/1.8 + 8 MP, f/2.2 (ultrawide) + 2 MP, f/2.4 (macro) + 2 MP, f/2.4 (depth)	8 MP, f/2.0	5000 mAh (Li-Po)	Android 11 (MIUI 12.5)	Android 13 (MIUI 14)	Carbon Gray, Pebble White, Sea Blue
Redmi 10 Prime 2022	selenes	21121119TI	May 2022	IPS LCD, 90 Hz Corning Gorilla Glass 3	6.5"	1080 x 2400 px (Full HD+, ~405 ppi)	No	MediaTek Helio G88 2x 2.0 GHz Cortex-A75 + 6x 1.8 GHz Cortex-A55	Mali-G52 MC2 @1 GHz	4 GB; 6 GB (LPDDR4X)	64 GB; 128 GB (eMMC 5.1)	50 MP, f/1.8 + 8 MP, f/2.2 (ultrawide) + 2 MP, f/2.4 (macro) + 2 MP, f/2.4 (depth)	8 MP, f/2.0	6000 mAh (Li-Po)	Android 11 (MIUI 12.5)	Android 13 (MIUI 14)	Astral White, Bifrost Blue, Phantom Black
Redmi 10A Sport	dandelion	220233L2I	July 2022	IPS LCD Corning Gorilla Glass 3	6.53"	720 x 1600 px (HD+, ~269 ppi)	No	MediaTek Helio G25 4x 2.0 GHz Cortex-A53 + 4x 1.5 GHz Cortex-A53	PowerVR GE8320 @650 MHz	6 GB (LPDDR4X)	128 GB (eMMC 5.1)	13 MP, f/2.2	5 MP, f/2.2	5000 mAh (Li-Po)	Android 11 (MIUI 12.5)	Android 11 (MIUI 12.5)	Charcoal Black, Sea Blue, Slate Grey
Redmi 10 5G China: Redmi Note 11E	light	22041219G	September 2022	IPS LCD, 90 Hz Corning Gorilla Glass 3	6.58"	1080 x 2408 px (Full HD+, ~401 ppi)	Yes	MediaTek Dimensity 700 2x 2.2 GHz Cortex-A76 + 6x 2.0 GHz Cortex-A55	Mali-G57 MC2 @950 MHz	4 GB; 6 GB (LPDDR4X)	64 GB; 128 GB (UFS 2.2)	50 MP, f/1.8 + 2 MP, f/2.4 (depth)	5 MP, f/2.2	5000 mAh (Li-Po)	Android 12 (MIUI 13)	Android 14 (HyperOS)	Chrome Silver, Graphite Gray, Aurora Green
Redmi 10 5G China: Redmi Note 11E	thunder	22041219NY	September 2022	IPS LCD, 90 Hz Corning Gorilla Glass 3	6.58"	1080 x 2408 px (Full HD+, ~401 ppi)	Yes	MediaTek Dimensity 700 2x 2.2 GHz Cortex-A76 + 6x 2.0 GHz Cortex-A55	Mali-G57 MC2 @950 MHz	4 GB; 6 GB (LPDDR4X)	64 GB; 128 GB (UFS 2.2)	50 MP, f/1.8 + 2 MP, f/2.4 (depth)	5 MP, f/2.2	5000 mAh (Li-Po)	Android 12 (MIUI 13)	Android 14 (HyperOS)	Chrome Silver, Graphite Gray, Aurora Green
Redmi 11 Prime POCO M5	rock	22071219AI	September 2022	IPS LCD, 90 Hz Corning Gorilla Glass 3	6.58"	1080 x 2408 px (Full HD+, ~401 ppi)	No	MediaTek Helio G99 2x 2.2 GHz Cortex-A76 + 6x 2.0 GHz Cortex-A55	Mali-G57 MC2 @1 GHz	4 GB; 6 GB (LPDDR4X)	64 GB; 128 GB (UFS 2.2)	50 MP, f/1.8 + 2 MP, f/2.4 (macro) + 2 MP, f/2.4 (depth)	8 MP, f/2.2	5000 mAh (Li-Po)	Android 12 (MIUI 13)	Android 14 (HyperOS)	Playful Green, Flashy Black, Peppy Purple
Redmi 11 Prime 5G	light	22041219I	September 2022	IPS LCD, 90 Hz Corning Gorilla Glass 3	6.58"	1080 x 2408 px (Full HD+, ~401 ppi)	Yes	MediaTek Dimensity 700 4x 2.2 GHz Cortex-A76 + 4x 1.6 GHz Cortex-A55	Mali-G57 MC2 @950 MHz	4 GB; 6 GB (LPDDR4X)	64 GB; 128 GB (UFS 2.2)	50 MP, f/1.8 + 2 MP, f/2.4 (depth)	8 MP, f/2.2	5000 mAh (Li-Po)	Android 12 (MIUI 13)	Android 14 (HyperOS)	Chrome Silver, Thunder Black, Meadow Green
Redmi 12C POCO C55	earth	2212ARNC4L 22120RN86H 22120RN86C 22120RN86G 22120RN86I	January 2023	IPS LCD Corning Gorilla Glass 3	6.71"	720 x 1650 px (HD+, ~268 ppi)	No	MediaTek Helio G85 2x 2.0 GHz Cortex-A75 + 6x 1.8 GHz Cortex-A55	Mali-G52 MC2 @1 GHz	3 GB 4 GB; 6 GB (LPDDR4X)	32 GB; 128 GB (eMMC 5.1)	50 MP, f/1.8 + 0.08 MP (depth)	5 MP, f/2.2	5000 mAh (Li-Po)	Android 12 (MIUI 13)	Android 14 (HyperOS)	Graphite Gray/Shadow Black, Dark Blue/Ocean Blue, Mint Green, Lavender Purple
Redmi 12C POCO C55	aether (NFC)	22126RN91Y	January 2023	IPS LCD Corning Gorilla Glass 3	6.71"	720 x 1650 px (HD+, ~268 ppi)	No	MediaTek Helio G85 2x 2.0 GHz Cortex-A75 + 6x 1.8 GHz Cortex-A55	Mali-G52 MC2 @1 GHz	3 GB 4 GB; 6 GB (LPDDR4X)	32 GB; 128 GB (eMMC 5.1)	50 MP, f/1.8 + 0.08 MP (depth)	5 MP, f/2.2	5000 mAh (Li-Po)	Android 12 (MIUI 13)	Android 14 (HyperOS)	Graphite Gray/Shadow Black, Dark Blue/Ocean Blue, Mint Green, Lavender Purple
Redmi 12	fire	23053RN02A 23053RN02I 23053RN02L	June 2023	IPS LCD, 90 Hz Corning Gorilla Glass 3	6.79"	1080 x 2460 px (Full HD+, ~396 ppi)	No	MediaTek Helio G88 2x 2.0 GHz Cortex-A75 + 6x 1.8 GHz Cortex-A55	Mali-G52 MC2 @1 GHz	4 GB 8 GB (LPDDR4X)	128 GB 256 GB (eMMC 5.1)	50 MP, f/1.8 + 8 MP, f/2.2 (ultrawide) + 2 MP, f/2.4 (macro)	8 MP, f/2.1	5000 mAh (Li-Po)	Android 13 (MIUI 14)	Android 15 (HyperOS 2)	Midnight/Jade Black, Sky/Pastel Blue, Polar/Moonstone Silver
Redmi 12	heat	23053RN02Y	June 2023	IPS LCD, 90 Hz Corning Gorilla Glass 3	6.79"	1080 x 2460 px (Full HD+, ~396 ppi)	No	MediaTek Helio G88 2x 2.0 GHz Cortex-A75 + 6x 1.8 GHz Cortex-A55	Mali-G52 MC2 @1 GHz	4 GB 8 GB (LPDDR4X)	128 GB 256 GB (eMMC 5.1)	50 MP, f/1.8 + 8 MP, f/2.2 (ultrawide) + 2 MP, f/2.4 (macro)	8 MP, f/2.1	5000 mAh (Li-Po)	Android 13 (MIUI 14)	Android 15 (HyperOS 2)	Midnight/Jade Black, Sky/Pastel Blue, Polar/Moonstone Silver
Redmi 12 5G	river	23077RABDC 23076RN8DY 23076RA4BR XIG03 A401XM	August 2023	IPS LCD, 90 Hz Corning Gorilla Glass 3	6.79"	1080 x 2460 px (Full HD+, ~396 ppi)	Yes	Qualcomm Snapdragon 4 Gen 2 2x 2.2 GHz Cortex-A78 + 6x 2 GHz Cortex-A55	Adreno 613	4 GB 6 GB 8 GB (LPDDR4X)	128 GB 256 GB (UFS 2.2)	50 MP, f/1.8 + 2 MP, f/2.4 (depth)	5 MP, f/2.2	5000 mAh (Li-Po)	Android 13 (MIUI 14)	Android 15 (HyperOS 2)	Midnight Black, Sky Blue, Polar Silver, Star Rock Gray, Ice Porcelain White
Redmi 12 5G (India) POCO M6 Pro 5G China: Redmi Note 12R	sky	23076RN4BI	August 2023	IPS LCD, 90 Hz Corning Gorilla Glass 3	6.79"	1080 x 2460 px (Full HD+, ~396 ppi)	Yes	Qualcomm Snapdragon 4 Gen 2 2x 2.2 GHz Cortex-A78 + 6x 2 GHz Cortex-A55	Adreno 613	4 GB 6 GB 8 GB (LPDDR4X)	128 GB 256 GB (UFS 2.2)	50 MP, f/1.8 + 2 MP, f/2.4 (depth)	8 MP, f/2.0	5000 mAh (Li-Po)	Android 13 (MIUI 14)	Android 15 (HyperOS 2)	Jade Black, Pastel Blue, Moonstone Silver
Redmi 12R	sky	23076RA4BC	December 2023	IPS LCD, 90 Hz Corning Gorilla Glass 3	6.79"	1080 x 2460 px (Full HD+, ~396 ppi)	Yes	Qualcomm Snapdragon 4 Gen 2 2x 2.2 GHz Cortex-A78 + 6x 2 GHz Cortex-A55	Adreno 613	4 GB (LPDDR4X)	128 GB (UFS 2.2)	50 MP, f/1.8 + 2 MP, f/2.4 (depth)	5 MP, f/2.2	5000 mAh (Li-Po)	Android 13 (MIUI 14)	Android 15 (HyperOS 2)	Obsidian Black, Smoke Green
Redmi 13C POCO C65	gale	23106RN0DA 23100RN82L	November 2023	IPS LCD, 90 Hz Corning Gorilla Glass	6.74"	720 x 1600 px (HD+, ~260 ppi)	No	MediaTek Helio G85 2x 2.0 GHz Cortex-A75 + 6x 1.8 GHz Cortex-A55	Mali-G52 MC2 @1 GHz	4 GB 6 GB 8 GB (LPDDR4X)	128 GB 256 GB (eMMC 5.1)	50 MP, f/1.8 + 2 MP, f/2.4 (macro) + 0.08 MP (depth)	8 MP, f/2.0	5000 mAh (Li-Po)	Android 13 (MIUI 14)	Android 15 (HyperOS 2)	Midnight Black, Navy Blue, Glacier White, Clover Green
Redmi 13C POCO C65	gust	23108RN04Y	November 2023	IPS LCD, 90 Hz Corning Gorilla Glass	6.74"	720 x 1600 px (HD+, ~260 ppi)	No	MediaTek Helio G85 2x 2.0 GHz Cortex-A75 + 6x 1.8 GHz Cortex-A55	Mali-G52 MC2 @1 GHz	4 GB 6 GB 8 GB (LPDDR4X)	128 GB 256 GB (eMMC 5.1)	50 MP, f/1.8 + 2 MP, f/2.4 (macro) + 0.08 MP (depth)	8 MP, f/2.0	5000 mAh (Li-Po)	Android 13 (MIUI 14)	Android 15 (HyperOS 2)	Midnight Black, Navy Blue, Glacier White, Clover Green
Redmi 13C 5G	air	23124RN87I 23124RN87C	December 2023	IPS LCD, 90 Hz Corning Gorilla Glass	6.74"	720 x 1600 px (HD+, ~260 ppi)	Yes	MediaTek Dimensity 6100+ 2x 2.2 GHz Cortex-A76 + 6x 2.0 GHz Cortex-A55	Mali-G57 MC2	4 GB 6 GB 8 GB (LPDDR4X)	128 GB 256 GB (UFS 2.2)	50 MP, f/1.8 + 0.08 MP (depth)	5 MP	5000 mAh (Li-Po)	Android 13 (MIUI 14)	Android 15 (HyperOS 2)	Starlight Black, Startrail Green, Startrail Silver
Redmi 13C 5G	atmos	23124RN87G	June 2024	IPS LCD, 90 Hz Corning Gorilla Glass	6.74"	720 x 1600 px (HD+, ~260 ppi)	Yes	MediaTek Dimensity 6100+ 2x 2.2 GHz Cortex-A76 + 6x 2.0 GHz Cortex-A55	Mali-G57 MC2	4 GB 8 GB (LPDDR4X)	128 GB 256 GB (UFS 2.2)	50 MP, f/1.8 + 0.08 MP (depth)	5 MP	5000 mAh (Li-Po)	Android 13 (MIUI 14)	Android 15 (HyperOS 2)	Starry Black, Twilight Blue, Starry Silver
Redmi 13R India: POCO M6 5G	air	23124RN87C	December 2023	IPS LCD, 90 Hz Corning Gorilla Glass	6.74"	720 x 1600 px (HD+, ~260 ppi)	Yes	MediaTek Dimensity 6100+ 2x 2.2 GHz Cortex-A76 + 6x 2.0 GHz Cortex-A55	Mali-G57 MC2	4 GB (LPDDR4X)	128 GB 256 GB (UFS 2.2)	50 MP, f/1.8 + 0.08 MP (depth)	5 MP	5000 mAh (Li-Po)	Android 13 (MIUI 14)	Android 15 (HyperOS 2)	Starlight Black, Waterwave Green, Fantasy Purple
Redmi 13 POCO M6	tides moon	2404ARN45A 24049RN28L	June 2024	IPS LCD, 90 Hz Corning Gorilla Glass 3	6.79"	1080 x 2460 px (Full HD+, ~396 ppi)	No	MediaTek Helio G91 Ultra 2x 2.0 GHz Cortex-A75 + 6x 1.8 GHz Cortex-A55	Mali-G52 MC2 @1 GHz	6 GB 8 GB (LPDDR4X)	128 GB 256 GB (eMMC 5.1)	108 MP, f/1.8 + 2 MP, f/2.4 (macro)	13 MP, f/2.5	5030 mAh (Li-Po)	Android 14 (HyperOS)	Android 16 (HyperOS 3)	Midnight Black, Sandy Gold, Ocean Blue, Pearl Pink
Redmi 13 POCO M6	moon	24040RN64Y	June 2024	IPS LCD, 90 Hz Corning Gorilla Glass 3	6.79"	1080 x 2460 px (Full HD+, ~396 ppi)	No	MediaTek Helio G91 Ultra 2x 2.0 GHz Cortex-A75 + 6x 1.8 GHz Cortex-A55	Mali-G52 MC2 @1 GHz	6 GB 8 GB (LPDDR4X)	128 GB 256 GB (eMMC 5.1)	108 MP, f/1.8 + 2 MP, f/2.4 (macro)	13 MP, f/2.5	5030 mAh (Li-Po)	Android 14 (HyperOS)	Android 16 (HyperOS 3)	Midnight Black, Sandy Gold, Ocean Blue, Pearl Pink
Redmi 13 5G POCO M6 Plus China: Redmi Note 13R	breeze	2406ERN9CI	July 2024	IPS LCD, 120 Hz Corning Gorilla Glass 3	6.79"	1080 x 2460 px (Full HD+, ~396 ppi)	Yes	Qualcomm Snapdragon 4 Gen 2 AE 2x 2.2 GHz Cortex-A78 + 6x 2 GHz Cortex-A55	Adreno 613	6 GB 8 GB (LPDDR4X)	128 GB 256 GB (UFS 2.2)	108 MP, f/1.8 + 2 MP, f/2.4 (macro)	13 MP, f/2.5	5030 mAh (Li-Po)	Android 14 (HyperOS)	Android 16 (HyperOS 3)	Black Diamond, Hawaiian Blue, Orchid Pink
Redmi 13x	tides moon	2404ARN45A	March 2025	IPS LCD, 90 Hz Corning Gorilla Glass 3	6.79"	1080 x 2460 px (Full HD+, ~396 ppi)	No	MediaTek Helio G91 Ultra 2x 2.0 GHz Cortex-A75 + 6x 1.8 GHz Cortex-A55	Mali-G52 MC2 @1 GHz	6 GB 8 GB (LPDDR4X)	128 GB 256 GB (eMMC 5.1)	108 MP, f/1.8 + 2 MP, f/2.4 (macro)	13 MP, f/2.5	5030 mAh (Li-Po)	Android 14 (HyperOS)	Android 16 (HyperOS 3)	Midnight Black, Silk Gold, Silk Blue
Redmi 14C Redmi A3 Pro, POCO C75	lake pond	2409BRN2CA 2409BRN2CI 2409BRN2CL	August 2024	IPS LCD, 120 Hz Corning Gorilla Glass 3	6.88"	720 x 1640 px (HD+, ~260 ppi)	No	MediaTek Helio G81 Ultra 2x 2.0 GHz Cortex-A75 + 6x 1.8 GHz Cortex-A55	Mali-G52 MC2	4 GB 6 GB 8 GB (LPDDR4X)	64 GB 128 GB 256 GB (eMMC 5.1)	50 MP, f/1.8 + 0.08 MP (depth)	13 MP, f/2.0	5160 mAh (Li-Po)	Android 14 (HyperOS)	Android 16 (HyperOS 3)	Midnight Black, Sage Green, Dreamy Purple, Starry Blue
Redmi 14C Redmi A3 Pro, POCO C75	lake	2409BRN2CY (NFC)	August 2024	IPS LCD, 120 Hz Corning Gorilla Glass 3	6.88"	720 x 1640 px (HD+, ~260 ppi)	No	MediaTek Helio G81 Ultra 2x 2.0 GHz Cortex-A75 + 6x 1.8 GHz Cortex-A55	Mali-G52 MC2	4 GB 6 GB 8 GB (LPDDR4X)	64 GB 128 GB 256 GB (eMMC 5.1)	50 MP, f/1.8 + 0.08 MP (depth)	13 MP, f/2.0	5160 mAh (Li-Po)	Android 14 (HyperOS)	Android 16 (HyperOS 3)	Midnight Black, Sage Green, Dreamy Purple, Starry Blue
Redmi 14R	flame	2411DRN47C	September 2024	IPS LCD, 120 Hz Corning Gorilla Glass 3	6.88"	720 x 1640 px (HD+, ~260 ppi)	Yes	Qualcomm Snapdragon 4 Gen 2 2x 2.2 GHz Cortex-A78 + 6x 2 GHz Cortex-A55	Adreno 613	4 GB 6 GB 8 GB (LPDDR4X)	128 GB 256 GB (UFS 2.2)	13 MP + 0.08 MP (depth)	5 MP	5160 mAh (Li-Po)	Android 14 (HyperOS)	Android 15 (HyperOS 2)	Shadow Black, Olive Green, Lavender Purple, Navy Blue
Redmi 14C 5G POCO M7 5G	flame	2411DRN47I (India)	January 2025	IPS LCD, 120 Hz Corning Gorilla Glass 3	6.88"	720 x 1640 px (HD+, ~260 ppi)	Yes	Qualcomm Snapdragon 4 Gen 2 2x 2.2 GHz Cortex-A78 + 6x 2 GHz Cortex-A55	Adreno 613	4 GB 6 GB (LPDDR4X)	64 GB 128 GB (UFS 2.2)	50 MP, f/1.8 + 0.08 MP (depth)	8 MP	5160 mAh (Li-Po)	Android 14 (HyperOS)	Android 15 (HyperOS 2)	Stargaze Black, Stardust Purple, Starlight Blue
Redmi 14C 5G POCO M7 5G	flame blaze	2411DRN47G (Global) 2411DRN47R (Japan)	January 2025	IPS LCD, 120 Hz Corning Gorilla Glass 3	6.88"	720 x 1640 px (HD+, ~260 ppi)	Yes	Qualcomm Snapdragon 4 Gen 2 2x 2.2 GHz Cortex-A78 + 6x 2 GHz Cortex-A55	Adreno 613	4 GB 6 GB (LPDDR4X)	64 GB 128 GB (UFS 2.2)	50 MP, f/1.8 + 0.08 MP (depth)	8 MP	5160 mAh (Li-Po)	Android 14 (HyperOS)	Android 15 (HyperOS 2)	Stargaze Black, Stardust Purple, Starlight Blue
Redmi 14C (China) Redmi 17C	lake pond	2409BRN2CC	January 2025	IPS LCD, 120 Hz Corning Gorilla Glass 3	6.88"	720 x 1640 px (HD+, ~260 ppi)	No	MediaTek Helio G81 Ultra 2x 2.0 GHz Cortex-A75 + 6x 1.8 GHz Cortex-A55	Mali-G52 MC2	4 GB 6 GB 8 GB (LPDDR4X)	64 GB 128 GB 256 GB (eMMC 5.1)	13 MP + 0.08 MP (depth)	5 MP	5160 mAh (Li-Po)	Android 14 (HyperOS)	Android 15 (HyperOS 2)	Star Rock Gray, Glacier Silver, Green
Redmi 15 POCO M7	creek		August 2025	IPS LCD, 144 Hz Corning Gorilla Glass 3	6.9"	1080 x 2460 px (Full HD+, ~374 ppi)	No	Qualcomm Snapdragon 685 4x 2.8 GHz Cortex-A73 + 4x 1.9 GHz Cortex-A55	Adreno 610	6 GB 8 GB (LPDDR4X)	128 GB 256 GB (UFS 2.2)	50 MP, f/1.8 + Auxiliary lens	8 MP, f/2.0	7000 mAh (Si/C Li-Ion)	Android 15 (HyperOS 2)	Android 16 (HyperOS 3)	Midnight Black, Titan Gray, Sandy Purple
Redmi 15 5G POCO M7 Plus	spring	25057RN09G (Global)25057RN09E (Europe) 25057RN09I (India)	August 2025	IPS LCD, 144 Hz Corning Gorilla Glass 3	6.9"	1080 x 2460 px (Full HD+, ~374 ppi)	Yes	Qualcomm Snapdragon 6s Gen 3 2x 2.3 GHz Cortex-A78 + 6x 2.0 GHz Cortex-A55	Adreno 619	4 GB 6 GB 8 GB (LPDDR4X)	128 GB 256 GB (UFS 2.2)	50 MP, f/1.8 + Auxiliary lens	8 MP, f/2.0	7000 mAh (Si/C Li-Ion)	Android 15 (HyperOS 2)	Android 15 (HyperOS 2)	Midnight Black, Titan Gray, Ripple Green
Redmi 15CPOCO C85	dew	25057RN09G (Global) 25057RN09E (Europe) 25057RN09I (India)	August 2025	IPS LCD, 120 Hz Corning Gorilla Glass 3	6.9"	720 x 1640 px (HD+, ~254 ppi)	No	MediaTek Helio G81 Ultra 2x 2.0 GHz Cortex-A75 + 6x 1.8 GHz Cortex-A55	Mali-G52 MC2	4 GB 6 GB 8 GB (LPDDR4X)	128 GB 256 GB (eMMC 5.1)	50 MP, f/1.8 + 0.08 MP (auxiliary lens)	8 MP, f/2.0	6000 mAh (Li-Po)	Android 15 (HyperOS 2)	Android 15 (HyperOS 2)	Moonlight Blue, Mint Green, Midnight Gray, Twilight Orange
Redmi 15C 5GPOCO C85 5G	tornado	2508CRN2BG (Global)2508CRN2BE (Europe) 2508CRN2BI (India)2508CRN2BR (Japan)	September 2025	IPS LCD, 120 Hz Corning Gorilla Glass 3	6.9"	720 x 1640 px (HD+, ~254 ppi)	Yes	MediaTek Dimensity 6300 2x 2.4 GHz Cortex-A76 + 6x 2.0 GHz Cortex-A55	Mali-G57 MC2	4 GB 8 GB (LPDDR4X)	128 GB 256 GB (UFS 2.2)	50 MP, f/1.8 + 0.08 MP (auxiliary lens)	8 MP, f/2.0	6000 mAh (Li-Po)	Android 15 (HyperOS 2)	Android 15 (HyperOS 2)	Midnight Black, Mint Green, Dusk Purple
Redmi 15R	tornado	25082RNC1C	September 2025	IPS LCD, 120 Hz Corning Gorilla Glass 3	6.9"	720 x 1640 px (HD+, ~254 ppi)	Yes	MediaTek Dimensity 6300 2x 2.4 GHz Cortex-A76 + 6x 2.0 GHz Cortex-A55	Mali-G57 MC2	4 GB 6 GB 8 GB (LPDDR4X)	128 GB 256 GB (UFS 2.2)	13 MP + 0.08 MP (auxiliary lens)	5 MP	6000 mAh (Li-Po)	Android 15 (HyperOS 2)	Android 15 (HyperOS 2)	Star Rock Black, Lime Green, Dusk Purple, Misty White
Redmi 17C Redmi 14C (China)	lake pond	2409BRN2CC	June 2026	IPS LCD, 120 Hz Corning Gorilla Glass 3	6.88"	720 x 1640 px (HD+, ~260 ppi)	No	MediaTek Helio G81 Ultra 2x 2.0 GHz Cortex-A75 + 6x 1.8 GHz Cortex-A55	Mali-G52 MC2	4 GB (LPDDR4X)	64 GB 128 GB (eMMC 5.1)	13 MP + 0.08 MP (auxiliary lens)	5 MP	5160 mAh (Li-Po)	Android 16 (HyperOS 3)		Black, Danxia Red, Sea Breeze Blue
Model	Codename	Model number	Release date	Display type	Display size	Display resolution	5G support	SoC	GPU	RAM	Internal storage	Rear	Front	Battery	Initial	Current	Colors
Model	Codename	Model number	Release date	Display type	Display size	Display resolution	5G support	SoC	GPU	RAM	Internal storage	Camera		Battery	Operating system		Colors

=== Redmi Note Series ===
Model	Codename	Model number	Release date	Display type	Display size	Display resolution	5G support	SoC	GPU	RAM	Internal storage	Camera		Battery	Operating system		Colors
Model	Codename	Model number	Release date	Display type	Display size	Display resolution	5G support	SoC	GPU	RAM	Internal storage	Rear	Front	Battery	Initial	Current	Colors
Redmi Note	lcsh92 wet jb9	2013121 2013122 2014017 2014018	March 2014	IPS LCD	5.5"	720 x 1280 px (HD, ~267 ppi)	No	MediaTek MT6592 8x 1.7 GHz Cortex-A7	Mali-450 MP4 @700 MHz	1 GB; 2 GB (LPDDR2)	8 GB (eMMC 4.2)	13 MP, f/2.2	5 MP	3200 mAh (Li-Po)	Android 4.2.2 (MIUI V5)	Android 4.4.4 (MIUI 9)	Black, White
Redmi Note 4G	dior	2014712 2014715 2014017 2014021 2014022	August 2014	IPS LCD	5.5"	720 x 1280 px (HD, ~267 ppi)	No	Qualcomm Snapdragon 400 4x 1.6 GHz Cortex-A7	Adreno 305 @400 MHz	2 GB (LPDDR3)	8 GB (eMMC 4.2)	13 MP, f/2.2	5 MP	3100 mAh (Li-Po)	Android 4.2.2 (MIUI V5)	Android 4.4.4 (MIUI 9)	White
Redmi Note 1S 4G Global: Redmi Note Prime	gucci	2014910 2014911 2014912 2014915 2014916	September 2014	IPS LCD	5.5"	720 x 1280 px (HD, ~267 ppi)	No	Qualcomm Snapdragon 410 4x 1.2 GHz Cortex-A53	Adreno 306 @450 MHz	2 GB (LPDDR3)	16 GB (eMMC 5.0)	13 MP, f/2.2	5 MP	3100 mAh (Li-Po)	Android 4.4,2 (MIUI V5)	Android 4.4.4 (MIUI 9)	White
Redmi Note PrimeChina: Redmi Note 1S 4G	gucci	2014912	December 2015	IPS LCD	5.5"	720 x 1280 px (HD, ~267 ppi)	No	Qualcomm Snapdragon 410 4x 1.2 GHz Cortex-A53	Adreno 306 @450 MHz	2 GB (LPDDR3)	16 GB (eMMC 5.0)	13 MP, f/2.2	5 MP	3100 mAh (Li-Po)	Android 4.4,2 (MIUI 7)	Android 4.4.4 (MIUI 9)	White
Redmi Note 2	hermes	2015051 2015052 2015055	August 2015	IPS LCD	5.5"	1080 x 1920 px (Full HD, ~403 ppi)	No	MediaTek Helio X10 8x 2 GHz Cortex-A53	PowerVR G6200 @700 MHz	2 GB (LPDDR3)	16 GB (eMMC 5.0)	13 MP, f/2.2	5 MP, f/2.0	3060 mAh (Li-Po)	Android 5.0 (MIUI 6)	Android 5.0 (MIUI 9)	White, blue, yellow, pink, mint green
Redmi Note 2 Prime	hermes	2015056 2015712	August 2015	IPS LCD	5.5"	1080 x 1920 px (Full HD, ~403 ppi)	No	MediaTek Helio X10 8x 2.2 GHz Cortex-A53	PowerVR G6200 @700 MHz	2 GB (LPDDR3)	32 GB (eMMC 5.0)	13 MP, f/2.2	5 MP, f/2.0	3060 mAh (Li-Po)	Android 5.0 (MIUI 6)	Android 5.0 (MIUI 9)	White, blue, yellow, pink, mint green
Redmi Note 3 (MediaTek)	henessy	2015611 2015617	November 2015	IPS LCD	5.5"	1080 x 1920 px (Full HD, ~403 ppi)	No	MediaTek Helio X10 8x 2.0 GHz Cortex-A53	PowerVR G6200 @700 MHz	2 GB; 3 GB (LPDDR3)	16 GB; 32 GB (eMMC 5.0)	13 MP, f/2.2	5 MP, f/2.0	4000 mAh (Li-Po)	Android 5.0.2 (MIUI 7)	Android 5.0.2 (MIUI 9)	Silver, Gray, Gold
Redmi Note 3 Pro	kenzo	2015112 2015115	March 2016	IPS LCD	5.5"	1080 x 1920 px (Full HD, ~403 ppi)	No	Qualcomm Snapdragon 650 2x 1.8 GHz Cortex-A72 + 4x 1.4 GHz Cortex-A53	Adreno 510 @600 MHz	2 GB (LPDDR3)	16 GB (eMMC 5.1)	16 MP, f/2.0	5 MP, f/2.0	4050 mAh (Li-Po)	Android 5.1.1 (MIUI 7)	Android 6.0.1 (MIUI 10)	Silver, Gray, Gold
Redmi Note 3 (Snapdragon)	kenzo	2015116	March 2016	IPS LCD	5.5"	1080 x 1920 px (Full HD, ~403 ppi)	No	Qualcomm Snapdragon 650 2x 1.8 GHz Cortex-A72 + 4x 1.4 GHz Cortex-A53	Adreno 510 @600 MHz	2 GB (LPDDR3)	16 GB (eMMC 5.1)	16 MP, f/2.0	5 MP, f/2.0	4050 mAh (Li-Po)	Android 5.1.1 (MIUI 7)	Android 6.0.1 (MIUI 10)	Silver, Gray, Gold
Redmi Note 3 High/Special Edition	kate	2015161	June 2016	IPS LCD	5.5"	1080 x 1920 px (Full HD, ~403 ppi)	No	Qualcomm Snapdragon 650 2x 1.8 GHz Cortex-A72 + 4x 1.4 GHz Cortex-A53	Adreno 510 @600 MHz	3 GB (LPDDR3)	32 GB (eMMC 5.1)	16 MP, f/2.0	5 MP, f/2.0	4050 mAh (Li-Po)	Android 5.1.1 (MIUI 7)	Android 6.0.1 (MIUI 10)	Silver, Gray, Gold
Redmi Note 4 (MediaTek)	nikel	2016051	August 2016	IPS LCD	5.5"	1080 x 1920 px (Full HD, ~401 ppi)	No	MediaTek Helio X20 2x 2.1 GHz Cortex-A72 + 4x 1.85 GHz Cortex-A53 + 4x 1.4 GHz Cortex-A53	Mali-T880 MP4 @780 MHz	2 GB; 3 GB; 4 GB (LPDDR3)	32 GB; 64 GB (eMMC 5.1)	13 MP, f/2.0	5 MP, f/2.0	4100 mAh (Li-Po)	Android 6.0 (MIUI 8)	Android 6.0 (MIUI 10)	Silver, Gray, Gold, Blue, Black
Redmi Note 4 (Snapdragon)	mido	2016100	January 2017	IPS LCD	5.5"	1080 x 1920 px (Full HD, ~401 ppi)	No	Qualcomm Snapdragon 625 8x 2 GHz Cortex-A53	Adreno 506 @650 MHz	3 GB; 4 GB (LPDDR3)	32 GB; 64 GB (eMMC 5.1)	13 MP, f/2.0	5 MP, f/2.0	4100 mAh (Li-Po)	Android 6.0.1 (MIUI 8)	Android 7.1.2 (MIUI 11)	Dark Gray, Gold, Black, Lake Blue
Redmi Note 4X	mido	2016102	February 2017	IPS LCD	5.5"	1080 x 1920 px (Full HD, ~401 ppi)	No	Qualcomm Snapdragon 625 8x 2 GHz Cortex-A53	Adreno 506 @650 MHz	3 GB; 4 GB (LPDDR3)	16 GB; 32 GB; 64 GB (eMMC 5.1)	13 MP, f/2.0	5 MP, f/2.0	4100 mAh (Li-Po)	Android 6.0.1 (MIUI 8)	Android 7.1.2 (MIUI 11)	Platinum Silver, Champagne Gold, Matte Black, Hatsune Miku, Sakura Powder
Redmi Note 5A Prime India: Redmi Y1	ugg	MDE6S; MDG6S; MDT6S; MDI6S	September 2017	IPS LCD Corning Gorilla Glass 3	5.5"	720 x 1280 px (HD, ~267 ppi)	No	Qualcomm Snapdragon 435 8x 1.4 GHz Cortex-A53	Adreno 505 @450 MHz	3 GB; 4 GB (LPDDR3)	32 GB; 64 GB (eMMC 5.1)	13 MP, f/2.2	16 MP, f/2.5	3080 mAh (Li-Po)	Android 7.1.2 (MIUI 8)	Android 7.1.2 (MIUI 11)	Gold, Dark Grey, Silver, Rose Gold
Redmi Note 5A India: Redmi Y1 lite	ugglite	MDE6 MDG6; MDT6; MDI6	November 2017	IPS LCD Corning Gorilla Glass 3	5.5"	720 x 1280 px (HD, ~267 ppi)	No	Qualcomm Snapdragon 425 4x 1.4 GHz Cortex-A53	Adreno 308 @500 MHz	2 GB; 3 GB; 4 GB (LPDDR3)	16 GB; 32 GB; 64 GB (eMMC 5.1)	13 MP, f/2.2	5 MP, f/2.0	3080 mAh (Li-Po)	Android 7.1.2 (MIUI 8)	Android 7.1.2 (MIUI 11)	Gold, Dark Grey, Silver, Rose Gold
Redmi Note 5 (India) Global: Redmi 5 Plus	vince	MEI7	February 2018	IPS LCD	5.99"	1080 x 2160 px (Full HD+, ~403 ppi)	No	Qualcomm Snapdragon 625 8x 2.0 GHz Cortex-A53	Adreno 506 @650 MHz	3 GB; 4 GB (LPDDR3)	32 GB; 64 GB (eMMC 5.1)	12 MP, f/2.2	5 MP	4000 mAh (Li-Po)	Android 8.1 (MIUI 9)	Android 9 (MIUI 12)	Black, Gold, Blue, Rose Gold
Redmi Note 5 Pro	whyred	MEI7S	February 2018	IPS LCD Corning Gorilla Glass	5.99"	1080 x 2160 px (Full HD+, ~403 ppi)	No	Qualcomm Snapdragon 636 4x 1.8 GHz Cortex-A73 + 4x 1.6 GHz Cortex-A53	Adreno 509 @720 MHz	4 GB; 6 GB (LPDDR4X)	64 GB (eMMC 5.1)	12 MP, f/2.2 + 5 MP, f/2.0 (depth)	20 MP, f/2.2	4000 mAh (Li-Po)	Android 7.1.2 (MIUI 9)	Android 9 (MIUI 12)	Black, Champagne Gold, Rose Gold, Lake Blue
Redmi Note 5	whyred	M1803E7SG; M1803E7SH; MEE7S; MET7S; MEC7S	March 2018	IPS LCD Corning Gorilla Glass	5.99"	1080 x 2160 px (Full HD+, ~403 ppi)	No	Qualcomm Snapdragon 636 4x 1.8 GHz Cortex-A73 + 4x 1.6 GHz Cortex-A53	Adreno 509 @720 MHz	3 GB; 4 GB; 6 GB (LPDDR4X)	32 GB; 64 GB (eMMC 5.1)	12 MP, f/1.9 + 5 MP, f/2.0 (depth)	13 MP, f/2.0	4000 mAh (Li-Po)	Android 8.1 (MIUI 9)	Android 9 (MIUI 12)	Black, Gold, Rose Gold, Blue, Flame Red
Redmi Note 6 Pro	tulip	M1806E7TG (Global); M1806E7TH (China); M1806E7TI (India)	October 2018	IPS LCD Corning Gorilla Glass	6.26"	1080 x 2280 px (Full HD+, ~403 ppi)	No	Qualcomm Snapdragon 636 4x 1.8 GHz Cortex-A73 + 4x 1.6 GHz Cortex-A53	Adreno 509 @720 MHz	3 GB; 4 GB; 6 GB (LPDDR4X)	32 GB; 64 GB (eMMC 5.1)	12 MP, f/1.9 + 5 MP, f/2.2 (depth)	20 MP, f/2.0 + 2 MP, f/2.2 (depth)	4000 mAh (Li-Po)	Android 8.1 (MIUI 9)	Android 9 (MIUI 12)	Black, Blue, Rose Gold, Red
Redmi Note 7 India: Redmi Note 7S	lavender	M1901F7G (Global) M1901F7H (Asia–Pacific)	January 2019	IPS LCD Corning Gorilla Glass 5	6.3"	1080 x 2340 px (Full HD+, ~409 ppi)	No	Qualcomm Snapdragon 660 4x 2.2 GHz Cortex-A73 + 4x 1.84 GHz Cortex-A53	Adreno 512 @850 MHz	3 GB; 4 GB; 6 GB (LPDDR4X)	32 GB; 64 GB; 128 GB (eMMC 5.1)	48 MP, f/1.8 + 5 MP, f/2.2 (depth)	13 MP, f/2.0	4000 mAh (Li-Po)	Android 9 (MIUI 10)	Android 10 (MIUI 12.5)	Blue, Black, Twilight Gold, White, Ruby Red
Redmi Note 7 (India)	lavenderin	M1901F7I	February 2019	IPS LCD Corning Gorilla Glass 5	6.3"	1080 x 2340 px (Full HD+, ~409 ppi)	No	Qualcomm Snapdragon 660 4x 2.2 GHz Cortex-A73 + 4x 1.84 GHz Cortex-A53	Adreno 512 @850 MHz	3 GB; 4 GB (LPDDR4X)	32 GB; 64 GB (eMMC 5.1)	12 MP, f/1.8 + 5 MP, f/2.2 (depth)	13 MP, f/2.0	4000 mAh (Li-Po)	Android 9 (MIUI 10)	Android 10 (MIUI 12.5)	Sapphire Blue, Onyx Black, Ruby Red
Redmi Note 7 Pro	violet	M1901F7BE (China) M1901F7S (India)	March 2019	IPS LCD Corning Gorilla Glass 5	6.3"	1080 x 2340 px (Full HD+, ~409 ppi)	No	Qualcomm Snapdragon 675 2x 2.0 GHz Cortex-A76 + 6x 1.7 GHz Cortex-A55	Adreno 612 @745 MHz	4 GB; 6 GB (LPDDR4X)	64 GB; 128 GB (eMMC 5.1)	48MP, f/1.8 + 5 MP, f/2.4 (depth)	13 MP	4000 mAh (Li-Po)	Android 9 (MIUI 10)	Android 10 (MIUI 12.5)	Nebula Red, Neptune Blue, Space Black, Astro White
Redmi Note 7SGlobal: Redmi Note 7	lavender	M1901F71	May 2019	IPS LCD Corning Gorilla Glass 5	6.3"	1080 x 2340 px (Full HD+, ~409 ppi)	No	Qualcomm Snapdragon 660 4x 2.2 GHz Cortex-A73 + 4x 1.84 GHz Cortex-A53	Adreno 512 @850 MHz	3 GB; 4 GB (LPDDR4X)	32 GB; 64 GB (eMMC 5.1)	48 MP, f/1.8 + 5 MP, f/2.2 (depth)	13 MP, f/2.0	4000 mAh (Li-Po)	Android 9 (MIUI 10)	Android 10 (MIUI 12.5)	Sapphire Blue, Onyx Black, Twilight Gold, Astro White, Ruby Red
Redmi Note 8	ginkgo	M1908C3JH (China); M1908C3JG (Global); M1908C3JI (India)	August 2019	IPS LCD Corning Gorilla Glass 5	6.3"	1080 x 2340 px (Full HD+, ~409 ppi)	No	Qualcomm Snapdragon 665 4x 2.0 GHz Cortex-A73 + 4x 1.8 GHz Cortex-A53	Adreno 610 @950 MHz	3 GB; 4 GB; 6 GB (LPDDR4X)	32 GB; 64 GB; 128 GB (eMMC 5.1)	48 MP, f/1.8 + 8 MP, f/2.2 (ultrawide) + 2 MP, f/2.4 (macro) + 2 MP, f/2.4 (depth)	13 MP, f/2.0	4000 mAh (Li-Po)	Android 9 (MIUI 10)	Android 11 (MIUI 12.5)	Neptune Blue, Moonlight White, Space Black, Nebula Purple, Cosmic Purple
Redmi Note 8 Pro	begonia	M1906G7E (China); M1906G7I (India); M1906G7G (Global) M1906G7T (China, carrier locked)	August 2019	IPS LCD Corning Gorilla Glass 5	6.53"	1080 x 2340 px (Full HD+, ~395 ppi)	No	Mediatek Helio G90T 2x 2.05 GHz Cortex-A76 + 6x 2.0 GHz Cortex-A55	Mali-G76 MC4 @800 MHz	6 GB (Global); 8 GB (China exclusive) (LPDDR4X)	64 GB; 128 GB; 256 GB (UFS 2.1)	64 MP, f/1.9 + 8 MP, f/2.2 (ultrawide) + 2 MP, f/2.4 (macro) + 2 MP, f/2.4 (depth)	20 MP, f/2.0	4500 mAh (Li-Po)	Android 9 (MIUI 10)	Android 11 (MIUI 12.5)	Mineral Grey / Shadow Black, Pearl White / Halo White, Dark Blue, Forest Green / Gamma Green, Coral Orange
Redmi Note 8T	willow	M1908C3XG	November 2019	IPS LCD Corning Gorilla Glass 5	6.3"	1080 x 2340 px (Full HD+, ~409 ppi)	No	Qualcomm Snapdragon 665 4x 2.0 GHz Cortex-A73 + 4x 1.8 GHz Cortex-A53	Adreno 610 @950 MHz	3 GB; 4 GB (LPDDR4X)	32 GB; 64 GB; 128 GB (eMMC 5.1)	48 MP, f/1.8 + 8 MP, f/2.2 (ultrawide) + 2 MP, f/2.4 (macro) + 2 MP, f/2.4 (depth)	13 MP, f/2.0	4000 mAh (Li-Po)	Android 9 (MIUI 10)	Android 11 (MIUI 12.5)	Starscape Blue, Moonlight White, Moonshadow Grey
Redmi Note 8 (2021)	biloba	M1908C3JGG	May 2021	IPS LCD Corning Gorilla Glass 5	6.3"	1080 x 2340 px (Full HD+, ~409 ppi)	No	MediaTek Helio G85 2x 2.0 GHz Cortex-A75 + 6x 1.8 GHz Cortex-A55	Mali-G52 MC2 @1 GHz	3 GB; 4 GB (LPDDR4X)	64 GB; 128 GB (eMMC 5.1)	48 MP, f/1.8 + 8 MP, f/2.2 (ultrawide) + 2 MP, f/2.4 (macro) + 2 MP, f/2.4 (depth)	13 MP, f/2.0	4000 mAh (Li-Po)	Android 11 (MIUI 12.5)	Android 13 (MIUI 14)	Neptune Blue, Moonlight White, Space Black
Redmi Note 9 Pro (India) Global: Redmi Note 9S	curtana	M2003J6A1I	March 2020	IPS LCD Corning Gorilla Glass 5	6.67"	1080 x 2400 px (Full HD+, ~395 ppi)	No	Qualcomm Snapdragon 720G 2x 2.3 GHz Cortex-A76 + 6x 1.8 GHz Cortex-A55	Adreno 618 @700 MHz	4 GB; 6 GB (LPDDR4X)	64 GB; 128 GB UFS 2.1	48 MP, f/1.8 + 8 MP, f/2.2 (ultrawide) + 5 MP, f/2.4 (macro) + 2 MP, f/2.4 (depth)	16 MP, f/2.5	5020 mAh (Li-Po)	Android 10 (MIUI 11)	Android 12 (MIUI 14)	Aurora Blue, Glacier White, Interstellar Black
Redmi Note 9S India: Redmi Note 9 Pro	curtana	M2003J6A1G	April 2020	IPS LCD Corning Gorilla Glass 5	6.67"	1080 x 2400 px (Full HD+, ~395 ppi)	No	Qualcomm Snapdragon 720G 2x 2.3 GHz Cortex-A76 + 6x 1.8 GHz Cortex-A55	Adreno 618 @700 MHz	4 GB; 6 GB (LPDDR4X)	64 GB; 128 GB UFS 2.1	48 MP, f/1.8 + 8 MP, f/2.2 (ultrawide) + 5 MP, f/2.4 (macro) + 2 MP, f/2.4 (depth)	16 MP, f/2.5	5020 mAh (Li-Po)	Android 10 (MIUI 11)	Android 12 (MIUI 14)	Aurora Blue, Glacier White, Interstellar Grey
Redmi Note 9 Pro	joyeuse	M2003J6B2G	May 2020	IPS LCD Corning Gorilla Glass 5	6.67"	1080 x 2400 px (Full HD+, ~395 ppi)	No	Qualcomm Snapdragon 720G 2x 2.3 GHz Cortex-A76 + 6x 1.8 GHz Cortex-A55	Adreno 618 @700 MHz	6 GB; 8 GB (LPDDR4X)	64 GB; 128 GB UFS 2.1	64 MP, f/1.9 + 8 MP, f/2.2 (ultrawide) + 5 MP, f/2.4 (macro) + 2 MP, f/2.4 (depth)	16 MP, f/2.5	5020 mAh (Li-Po)	Android 10 (MIUI 11)	Android 12 (MIUI 14)	Tropical Green, Glacier White, Interstellar Grey
Redmi Note 9 Pro Max	excalibur	M2003J6B1I	May 2020	IPS LCD Corning Gorilla Glass 5	6.67"	1080 x 2400 px (Full HD+, ~395 ppi)	No	Qualcomm Snapdragon 720G 2x 2.3 GHz Cortex-A76 + 6x 1.8 GHz Cortex-A55	Adreno 618 @700 MHz	6 GB; 8 GB (LPDDR4X)	64 GB; 128 GB UFS 2.1	64 MP, f/1.9 + 8 MP, f/2.2 (ultrawide) + 5 MP, f/2.4 (macro) + 2 MP, f/2.4 (depth)	32 MP	5020 mAh (Li-Po)	Android 10 (MIUI 11)	Android 12 (MIUI 14)	Aurora Blue, Glacier White, Interstellar Black
Redmi Note 9 China: Redmi 10X 4G	merlin	M2003J15SI (India); M2003J15SS (Global)	May 2020	IPS LCD Corning Gorilla Glass 5	6.53"	1080 x 2340 px (Full HD+, ~395 ppi)	No	MediaTek Helio G85 2x 2.0 GHz Cortex-A75 + 6x 1.8 GHz Cortex-A55	Mali-G52 MC2 @1 GHz	3 GB; 4 GB; 6 GB (LPDDR4X)	64 GB; 128 GB	48 MP, f/1.8 + 8 MP, f/2.2 (ultrawide) + 2 MP, f/2.4 (macro) + 2 MP, f/2.4 (depth)	13 MP, f/2.3	5020 mAh (Li-Po)	Android 10 (MIUI 11)	Android 12 (MIUI 13)	Forest Green, Midnight Grey, Polar White
Redmi Note 9 China: Redmi 10X 4G	merlinnfc	M2003J15SG (NFC)	May 2020	IPS LCD Corning Gorilla Glass 5	6.53"	1080 x 2340 px (Full HD+, ~395 ppi)	No	MediaTek Helio G85 2x 2.0 GHz Cortex-A75 + 6x 1.8 GHz Cortex-A55	Mali-G52 MC2 @1 GHz	3 GB; 4 GB; 6 GB (LPDDR4X)	64 GB; 128 GB	48 MP, f/1.8 + 8 MP, f/2.2 (ultrawide) + 2 MP, f/2.4 (macro) + 2 MP, f/2.4 (depth)	13 MP, f/2.3	5020 mAh (Li-Po)	Android 10 (MIUI 11)	Android 12 (MIUI 13)	Forest Green, Midnight Grey, Polar White
Redmi Note 9 4G	lime	M2010J19SC	November 2020	IPS LCD Corning Gorilla Glass 3	6.53"	1080 x 2340 px (Full HD+, ~395 ppi)	No	Qualcomm Snapdragon 662 4x 2.0 GHz Cortex-A73 + 4x 1.8 GHz Cortex-A53	Adreno 610 @750 MHz	4 GB; 6 GB; 8 GB (LPDDR4X)	128 GB; 256 GB (UFS 2.2)	48 MP, f/1.8 + 8 MP, f/2.2 (ultrawide) + 2 MP, f/2.4 (depth)	8 MP, f/2.0	6000 mAh (Li-Po)	Android 10 (MIUI 12)	Android 12 (MIUI 14)	Gray, Green, Blue, Orange
Redmi Note 9 5G	cannon	M2007J22C	December 2020	IPS LCD Corning Gorilla Glass 5	6.53"	1080 x 2340 px (Full HD+, ~395 ppi)	Yes	MediaTek Dimensity 800U 2x 2.4 GHz Cortex-A76 + 6x 2.0 GHz Cortex-A55	Mali-G57 MC3 @850 MHz	4 GB; 6 GB; 8 GB (LPDDR4X)	128 GB; 256 GB (UFS 2.2)	48 MP, f/1.8 + 8 MP, f/2.2 (ultrawide) + 2 MP, f/2.4 (macro)	13 MP, f/2.3	5000 mAh (Li-Po)	Android 10 (MIUI 12)	Android 12 (MIUI 14)	Gray, Green, Violet
Redmi Note 9 Pro 5G Global: Xiaomi Mi 10T Lite; India: Xiaomi Mi 10i	gauguinpro	M2007J17C	December 2020	IPS LCD, 120 Hz Corning Gorilla Glass 5	6.67"	1080 x 2400 px (Full HD+, ~395 ppi)	Yes	Qualcomm Snapdragon 750G 2x 2.2 GHz Cortex-A77 + 6x 1.8 GHz Cortex-A55	Adreno 619 @950 MHz	6 GB; 8 GB (LPDDR4X)	128 GB; 256 GB (UFS 2.2)	108 MP, f/1.8 + 8 MP, f/2.2 (ultrawide) + 2 MP, f/2.4 (macro) + 2 MP, f/2.4 (depth)	16 MP, f/2.5	4820 mAh (Li-Po)	Android 10 (MIUI 12)	Android 12 (MIUI 14)	Gray, Blue, Red/Mint
Redmi Note 9T	cannong	M2007J22G (Global); M2007J22R (Japan) A001XM (Japan, SoftBank)	January 2021	IPS LCD Corning Gorilla Glass 5	6.53"	1080 x 2340 px (Full HD+, ~395 ppi)	Yes	MediaTek Dimensity 800U 2x 2.4 GHz Cortex-A76 + 6x 2.0 GHz Cortex-A55	Mali-G57 MC3 @850 MHz	4 GB; 6 GB (LPDDR4X)	64 GB; 128 GB UFS 2.1 (64 GB); UFS 2.2 (128 GB)	48 MP, f/1.8 + 2 MP, f/2.4 (macro) + 2 MP, f/2.4 (depth)	13 MP, f/2.3	5000 mAh (Li-Po)	Android 10 (MIUI 12)	Android 12 (MIUI 14)	Nightfall Black, Daybreak Purple
Redmi Note 10	mojito	M2101K7AI (India); M2101K7AG (Global)	March 2021	Super AMOLED Corning Gorilla Glass 3	6.43"	1080 x 2400 px (Full HD+, ~409 ppi)	No	Qualcomm Snapdragon 678 2x 2.2 GHz Cortex-A76 + 6x 1.7 GHz Cortex-A55	Adreno 612 @845 MHz	4 GB; 6 GB (LPDDR4X)	64 GB; 128 GB (UFS 2.2)	48 MP, f/1.8 + 8 MP, f/2.2 (ultrawide) + 2 MP, f/2.4 (macro) + 2 MP, f/2.4 (depth)	13 MP, f/2.5	5000 mAh (Li-Po)	Android 11 (MIUI 12)	Android 12 (MIUI 14)	Shadow Black / Onyx Gray, Frost White / Pebble White, Aqua Green / Lake Green
Redmi Note 10 Pro (India)	sweetin	M2101K6P	March 2021	Super AMOLED, 120 Hz Corning Gorilla Glass 5	6.67"	1080 x 2400 px (Full HD+, ~395 ppi)	No	Qualcomm Snapdragon 732G 2x 2.3 GHz Cortex-A76 + 6x 1.8 GHz Cortex-A55	Adreno 618 @825 MHz	6 GB; 8 GB (LPDDR4X)	64 GB; 128 GB (UFS 2.2)	64 MP, f/1.9 + 8 MP, f/2.2 (ultrawide) + 5 MP, f/2.4 (macro) + 2 MP, f/2.4 (depth)	16 MP, f/2.5	5020 mAh (Li-Po)	Android 11 (MIUI 12)	Android 12 (MIUI 13)	Dark Night, Glacial Blue, Vintage Bronze
Redmi Note 10 Pro Max	sweetin_pro	M2101K6I	March 2021	Super AMOLED, 120 Hz Corning Gorilla Glass 5	6.67"	1080 x 2400 px (Full HD+, ~395 ppi)	No	Qualcomm Snapdragon 732G 2x 2.3 GHz Cortex-A76 + 6x 1.8 GHz Cortex-A55	Adreno 618 @825 MHz	6 GB; 8 GB (LPDDR4X)	64 GB; 128 GB (UFS 2.2)	108 MP, f/1.9 + 8 MP, f/2.2 (ultrawide) + 5 MP, f/2.4 (macro) + 2 MP, f/2.4 (depth)	16 MP, f/2.5	5020 mAh (Li-Po)	Android 11 (MIUI 12)	Android 12 (MIUI 13)	Dark Night, Glacial Blue, Vintage Bronze
Redmi Note 10 Pro	sweetpro	M2101K6G (Global) M2101K6T (Thailand); M2101K6R (Japan)	March 2021	AMOLED, 120 Hz Corning Gorilla Glass 5	6.67"	1080 x 2400 px (Full HD+, ~395 ppi)	No	Qualcomm Snapdragon 732G 2x 2.3 GHz Cortex-A76 + 6x 1.8 GHz Cortex-A55	Adreno 618 @825 MHz	6 GB; 8 GB (LPDDR4X)	64 GB; 128 GB (UFS 2.2)	108 MP, f/1.9 + 8 MP, f/2.2 (ultrawide) + 5 MP, f/2.4 (macro) + 2 MP, f/2.4 (depth)	16 MP, f/2.5	5020 mAh (Li-Po)	Android 11 (MIUI 12)	Android 13 (MIUI 14)	Onyx Gray, Glacier Blue, Gradient Bronze
Redmi Note 10S	secret	M2101K7BG (Global); M2101K7BI (India)	April 2021	Super AMOLED Corning Gorilla Glass 3	6.53"	1080 x 2400 px (Full HD+, ~409 ppi)	No	Mediatek Helio G95 2x 2.05 GHz Cortex-A76 + 6x 2.0 GHz Cortex-A55	Mali-G76 MC4 @900 MHz	6 GB; 8 GB (LPDDR4X)	64 GB; 128 GB (UFS 2.2)	64 MP, f/1.8 + 8 MP, f/2.2 (ultrawide) + 2 MP, f/2.4 (macro) + 2 MP, f/2.4 (depth)	13 MP, f/2.5	5000 mAh (Li-Po)	Android 11 (MIUI 12.5)	Android 13 (MIUI 14)	Deep Sea Blue / Ocean Blue, Shadow Black / Onyx Gray, Frost White / Pebble White
Redmi Note 10S	rosemary	M2101K7BNY (NFC)	April 2021	Super AMOLED Corning Gorilla Glass 3	6.53"	1080 x 2400 px (Full HD+, ~409 ppi)	No	Mediatek Helio G95 2x 2.05 GHz Cortex-A76 + 6x 2.0 GHz Cortex-A55	Mali-G76 MC4 @900 MHz	6 GB; 8 GB (LPDDR4X)	64 GB; 128 GB (UFS 2.2)	64 MP, f/1.8 + 8 MP, f/2.2 (ultrawide) + 2 MP, f/2.4 (macro) + 2 MP, f/2.4 (depth)	13 MP, f/2.5	5000 mAh (Li-Po)	Android 11 (MIUI 12.5)	Android 13 (MIUI 14)	Deep Sea Blue / Ocean Blue, Shadow Black / Onyx Gray, Frost White / Pebble White
Redmi Note 10S	maltose	M2101K7BL (Latin America)	April 2021	Super AMOLED Corning Gorilla Glass 3	6.53"	1080 x 2400 px (Full HD+, ~409 ppi)	No	Mediatek Helio G95 2x 2.05 GHz Cortex-A76 + 6x 2.0 GHz Cortex-A55	Mali-G76 MC4 @900 MHz	6 GB; 8 GB (LPDDR4X)	64 GB; 128 GB (UFS 2.2)	64 MP, f/1.8 + 8 MP, f/2.2 (ultrawide) + 2 MP, f/2.4 (macro) + 2 MP, f/2.4 (depth)	13 MP, f/2.5	5000 mAh (Li-Po)	Android 11 (MIUI 12.5)	Android 13 (MIUI 14)	Deep Sea Blue / Ocean Blue, Shadow Black / Onyx Gray, Frost White / Pebble White
Redmi Note 10 5G	camellian	M2103K19G (Global)	April 2021	IPS LCD, 90 Hz Corning Gorilla Glass 3	6.5"	1080 x 2400 px (Full HD+, ~405 ppi)	Yes	MediaTek Dimensity 700 2x 2.2 GHz Cortex-A76 + 6x 2.0 GHz Cortex-A55	Mali-G57 MC2 @950 MHz	4 GB; 6 GB (LPDDR4X)	64 GB; 128 GB (UFS 2.2)	48 MP, f/1.8 + 2 MP, f/2.4 (macro) + 2 MP, f/2.4 (depth)	8 MP, f/2.0	5000 mAh (Li-Po)	Android 11(MIUI 12)	Android 13 (MIUI 14)	Chrome Silver, Graphite Gray, Nighttime Blue, Aurora Green
Redmi Note 10 5G	camellia	M2103K19C (China)	May 2021	IPS LCD, 90 Hz Corning Gorilla Glass 3	6.5"	1080 x 2400 px (Full HD+, ~405 ppi)	Yes	MediaTek Dimensity 700 2x 2.2 GHz Cortex-A76 + 6x 2.0 GHz Cortex-A55	Mali-G57 MC2 @950 MHz	4 GB; 6 GB; 8 GB (LPDDR4X)	128 GB; 256 GB (UFS 2.2)	48 MP, f/1.8 + 2 MP, f/2.4 (depth)	8 MP, f/2.0	5000 mAh (Li-Po)	Android 11(MIUI 12)	Android 13 (MIUI 14)	Nebula Gray, Sunny Mountain Blue, Bamboo Stone Blue, Moon Shadow Silver
Redmi Note 10 Pro (China) Global: Poco X3 GT	chopin	2104K10AC	June 2021	IPS LCD, 120 Hz Corning Gorilla Glass Victus	6.6"	1080 x 2400 px (Full HD+, ~399 ppi)	Yes	MediaTek Dimensity 1100 4x 2.6 GHz Cortex-A78 + 4x 2.0 GHz Cortex-A55	Mali-G77 MC9 @850 MHz	6 GB; 8 GB (LPDDR4X)	128 GB; 256 GB (UFS 3.1)	64 MP, f/1.8 + 8 MP, f/2.2 (ultrawide) + 2 MP, f/2.4 (macro)	16 MP, f/2.5	5000 mAh (Li-Po)	Android 11 (MIUI 12.5)	Android 13 (MIUI 14)	Stargaze Black, Wave Blue, Cloud White
Redmi Note 10T 5G	camellia	M2103K19I	July 2021	IPS LCD, 90 Hz Corning Gorilla Glass 3	6.5"	1080 x 2400 px (Full HD+, ~405 ppi)	Yes	MediaTek Dimensity 700 2x 2.2 GHz Cortex-A76 + 6x 2.0 GHz Cortex-A55	Mali-G57 MC2 @950 MHz	4 GB; 6 GB (LPDDR4X)	64 GB; 128 GB (UFS 2.2)	48 MP, f/1.8 + 2 MP, f/2.4 (macro) + 2 MP, f/2.4 (depth)	8 MP, f/2.0	5000 mAh (Li-Po)	Android 11 (MIUI 12)	Android 13 (MIUI 14)	Chromium White, Graphite Black, Metallic Blue, Mint Green
Redmi Note 10 JE	iris	XIG02	August 2021	IPS LCD, 90 Hz Corning Gorilla Glass 3	6.5"	1080 x 2400 px (Full HD+, ~405 ppi)	Yes	Qualcomm Snapdragon 480 2x 2.0 GHz Cortex-A76 + 6x 1.8 GHz Cortex-A55	Adreno 619 @825 MHz	4 GB (LPDDR4X)	64 GB (UFS 2.2)	48 MP, f/1.8 + 2 MP, f/2.4 (macro) + 2 MP, f/2.4 (depth)	8 MP, f/2.0	4800 mAh (Li-Po)	Android 11 (MIUI 12.5)	Android 13 (MIUI 14)	Chrome Silver, Graphite Gray
Redmi Note 10 Lite Indian Redmi Note 9 Pro with new Champagne Gold colour	curtana	M2002F4LG	October 2021	IPS LCD Corning Gorilla Glass 5	6.67"	1080 x 2400 px (Full HD+, ~395 ppi)	No	Qualcomm Snapdragon 720G 2x 2.3 GHz Cortex-A76 + 6x 1.8 GHz Cortex-A55	Adreno 618 @700 MHz	4 GB; 6 GB (LPDDR4X)	64 GB; 128 GB (UFS 2.1)	48 MP, f/1.9 + 8 MP, f/2.2 (ultrawide) + 5 MP, f/2.4 (macro) + 2 MP, f/2.4 (depth)	16 MP, f/2.5	5020 mAh (Li-Po)	Android 10 (MIUI 12)	Android 12 (MIUI 14)	Aurora Blue, Glacier White, Interstellar Black, Champagne Gold
Redmi Note 10T (Japan)	iris	A101XM	April 2022	IPS LCD, 90 Hz Corning Gorilla Glass 3	6.5"	1080 x 2400 px (Full HD+, ~405 ppi)	Yes	Qualcomm Snapdragon 480 2x 2.0 GHz Cortex-A76 + 6x 1.8 GHz Cortex-A55	Adreno 619 @825 MHz	4 GB (LPDDR4X)	64 GB (UFS 2.2)	50 MP, f/1.8 + 2 MP, f/2.4 (depth)	8 MP, f/2.0	5000 mAh (Li-Po)	Android 11 (MIUI 13)	Android 13 (MIUI 14)	Gray, Dark Blue, Aqua Blue colors
Redmi Note 11 5G Global: Poco M4 Pro 5G India: Redmi Note 11T 5G	evergo	21091116AC	November 2021	IPS LCD, 90 Hz Corning Gorilla Glass 3	6.6"	1080 x 2400 px (Full HD+, ~399 ppi)	Yes	MediaTek Dimensity 810 2x 2.4 GHz Cortex-A76 + 6x 2.0 GHz Cortex-A55	Mali-G57 MC2 @950 MHz	4 GB; 6 GB; 8 GB (LPDDR4X)	128 GB; 256 GB (UFS 2.2)	50 MP, f/1.8 + 8 MP, f/2.2 (ultrawide)	16 MP, f/2.5	5000 mAh (Li-Po)	Android 11 (MIUI 12.5)	Android 13 (HyperOS)	Mysterious Black, Milk y Way Blue, Mint Green
Redmi Note 11 Pro (China) India: Xiaomi 11i	pissarro	21091116C	November 2021	Super AMOLED, 120 Hz Corning Gorilla Glass 5	6.67"	1080 x 2400 px (Full HD+, ~395 ppi)	Yes	MediaTek Dimensity 920 2x 2.5 GHz Cortex-A78 + 6x 2.0 GHz Cortex-A55	Mali-G68 MC4 @900 MHz	6 GB; 8 GB (LPDDR4X)	128 GB; 256 GB (UFS 2.2)	108 MP, f/1.9 + 8 MP, f/2.2 (ultrawide) + 2 MP, f/2.4 (telephoto macro)	16 MP, f/2.5	5160 mAh (Li-Po)	Android 11 (MIUI 12.5)	Android 13 (HyperOS)	Mysterious Black; Forest Green; Timeless Purple; Milky Way Blue
Redmi Note 11 Pro+ 5G India: Xiaomi 11i HyperCharge	pissarro	21091116UG (Global) 21091116UC (China)	November 2021	Super AMOLED, 120 Hz Corning Gorilla Glass 5	6.67"	1080 x 2400 px (Full HD+, ~395 ppi)	Yes	MediaTek Dimensity 920 2x 2.5 GHz Cortex-A78 + 6x 2.0 GHz Cortex-A55	Mali-G68 MC4 @900 MHz	6 GB; 8 GB (LPDDR4X)	128 GB; 256 GB (UFS 2.2)	108 MP, f/1.9 + 8 MP, f/2.2 (ultrawide) + 2 MP, f/2.4 (telephoto macro)	16 MP, f/2.5	4500 mAh (Li-Po)	Android 11 (MIUI 12.5)	Android 13 (HyperOS)	Mysterious Black; Forest Green; Timeless Purple, YIBO DESIGN
Redmi Note 11 4G	selenes	21121119SC	December 2021	IPS LCD, 90 Hz Corning Gorilla Glass 5	6.5"	1080 x 2400 px (Full HD+, ~405 ppi)	No	MediaTek Helio G88 2x 2.0 GHz Cortex-A75 + 6x 1.8 GHz Cortex-A55	Mali-G52 MC2 @1 GHz	4 GB; 6 GB (LPDDR4X)	128 GB (eMMC 5.1)	50 MP, f/1.8 + 8 MP, f/2.2 (ultrawide) + 2 MP, f/2.4 (macro)	8 MP, f/2.0	5000 mAh (Li-Po)	Android 11 (MIUI 12.5)	Android 13 (MIUI 14)	Mysterious Black Realm, Time Monologue, Dream Clear Sk
Redmi Note 11T 5G China: Redmi Note 11 5G Global: Poco M4 Pro 5G	evergo	21091116AI	December 2021	IPS LCD, 90 Hz Corning Gorilla Glass 3	6.6"	1080 x 2400 px (Full HD+, ~399 ppi)	Yes	MediaTek Dimensity 810 2x 2.4 GHz Cortex-A76 + 6x 2.0 GHz Cortex-A55	Mali-G57 MC2 @950 MHz	4 GB; 6 GB; 8 GB (LPDDR4X)	64 GB; 128 GB (UFS 2.2)	50 MP, f/1.8 + 8 MP, f/2.2 (ultrawide)	16 MP, f/2.5	5000 mAh (Li-Po)	Android 11 (MIUI 12.5)	Android 13 (HyperOS)	Mysterious Black; Milky Way Blue; Mint Green
Redmi Note 11	spes	2201117TI (India); 2201117TL (Latin America); 2201117TG (Global)	February 2022	AMOLED, 90 Hz Corning Gorilla Glass 3	6.43"	1080 x 2400 px (Full HD+, ~409 ppi)	No	Qualcomm Snapdragon 680 4x 2.4 GHz Cortex-A73 + 4x 1.9 GHz Cortex-A55	Adreno 610	4 GB; 6 GB (LPDDR4X)	64 GB; 128 GB (UFS 2.2)	50 MP, f/1.8 + 8 MP, f/2.2 (ultrawide) + 2 MP, f/2.4 (macro) + 2 MP, f/2.4 (depth)	13 MP, f/2.4	5000 mAh (Li-Po)	Android 11 (MIUI 13)	Android 13 (HyperOS)	Graphite Gray, Pearl White, Star Blue
Redmi Note 11	spesn	2201117TY (NFC)	February 2022	AMOLED, 90 Hz Corning Gorilla Glass 3	6.43"	1080 x 2400 px (Full HD+, ~409 ppi)	No	Qualcomm Snapdragon 680 4x 2.4 GHz Cortex-A73 + 4x 1.9 GHz Cortex-A55	Adreno 610	4 GB; 6 GB (LPDDR4X)	64 GB; 128 GB (UFS 2.2)	50 MP, f/1.8 + 8 MP, f/2.2 (ultrawide) + 2 MP, f/2.4 (macro) + 2 MP, f/2.4 (depth)	13 MP, f/2.4	5000 mAh (Li-Po)	Android 11 (MIUI 13)	Android 13 (HyperOS)	Graphite Gray, Pearl White, Star Blue
Redmi Note 11S	fleur	2201117SY	February 2022	AMOLED, 90 Hz Corning Gorilla Glass 3	6.43"	1080 x 2400 px (Full HD+, ~409 ppi)	No	Mediatek Helio G96 2x 2.05 GHz Cortex-A76 + 6x 2.0 GHz Cortex-A55	Mali-G57 MC2	6 GB; 8 GB (LPDDR4X)	64 GB; 128 GB (UFS 2.2)	108 MP, f/1.9 + 8 MP, f/2.2 (ultrawide) + 2 MP, f/2.4 (macro) + 2 MP, f/2.4 (depth)	16 MP, f/2.5	5000 mAh (Li-Po)	Android 11 (MIUI 13)	Android 13 (HyperOS)	Graphite Gray, Pearl White, Twilight Blue
Redmi Note 11S	miel	2201117SG (Global) 2201117SI (India) 2201117SL (Latin America)	February 2022	AMOLED, 90 Hz Corning Gorilla Glass 3	6.43"	1080 x 2400 px (Full HD+, ~409 ppi)	No	Mediatek Helio G96 2x 2.05 GHz Cortex-A76 + 6x 2.0 GHz Cortex-A55	Mali-G57 MC2	6 GB; 8 GB (LPDDR4X)	64 GB; 128 GB (UFS 2.2)	108 MP, f/1.9 + 8 MP, f/2.2 (ultrawide) + 2 MP, f/2.4 (macro) + 2 MP, f/2.4 (depth)	16 MP, f/2.5	5000 mAh (Li-Po)	Android 11 (MIUI 13)	Android 13 (HyperOS)	Graphite Gray, Pearl White, Twilight Blue
Redmi Note 11 Pro	viva	2201116TG (Global)	February 2022	Super AMOLED, 120 Hz Corning Gorilla Glass 5	6.67"	1080 x 2400 px (Full HD+, ~395 ppi)	No	Mediatek Helio G96 2x 2.05 GHz Cortex-A76 + 6x 2.0 GHz Cortex-A55	Mali-G57 MC2	6 GB; 8 GB (LPDDR4X)	64 GB; 128 GB (UFS 2.2)	108 MP, f/1.9 + 8 MP, f/2.2 (ultrawide) + 2 MP, f/2.4 (macro) + 2 MP, f/2.4 (depth)	16 MP, f/2.5	5000 mAh (Li-Po)	Android 11 (MIUI 13)	Android 13 (HyperOS)	Graphite Gray, Polar White, Star Blue
Redmi Note 11 Pro	vida	2201116TI (India)	February 2022	Super AMOLED, 120 Hz Corning Gorilla Glass 5	6.67"	1080 x 2400 px (Full HD+, ~395 ppi)	No	Mediatek Helio G96 2x 2.05 GHz Cortex-A76 + 6x 2.0 GHz Cortex-A55	Mali-G57 MC2	6 GB; 8 GB (LPDDR4X)	64 GB; 128 GB (UFS 2.2)	108 MP, f/1.9 + 8 MP, f/2.2 (ultrawide) + 2 MP, f/2.4 (macro) + 2 MP, f/2.4 (depth)	16 MP, f/2.5	5000 mAh (Li-Po)	Android 11 (MIUI 13)	Android 13 (HyperOS)	Graphite Gray, Polar White, Star Blue
Redmi Note 11 Pro 5G Poco X4 Pro 5G India: Redmi Note 11 Pro+ 5G	veux	2201116SG	February 2022	Super AMOLED, 120 Hz Corning Gorilla Glass 5	6.67"	1080 x 2400 px (Full HD+, ~395 ppi)	Yes	Qualcomm Snapdragon 695 2x 2.2 GHz Cortex-A76 + 6x 1.7 GHz Cortex-A55	Adreno 619 @950 MHz	4 GB; 6 GB; 8 GB (LPDDR4X)	64 GB; 128 GB (UFS 2.2)	108 MP, f/1.9 + 8 MP, f/2.2 (ultrawide) + 2 MP, f/2.4 (macro)	16 MP, f/2.5	5000 mAh (Li-Po)	Android 11 (MIUI 13)	Android 13 (HyperOS)	Graphite Gray, Polar White, Atlantic Blue
Redmi Note 11 Pro+ 5G (India) Global: Redmi Note 11 Pro 5G, Poco X4 Pro 5G	peux	2201116SI	March 2022	Super AMOLED, 120 Hz Corning Gorilla Glass 5	6.67"	1080 x 2400 px (Full HD+, ~395 ppi)	Yes	Qualcomm Snapdragon 695 2x 2.2 GHz Cortex-A76 + 6x 1.7 GHz Cortex-A55	Adreno 619 @950 MHz	4 GB; 6 GB; 8 GB (LPDDR4X)	64 GB; 128 GB; 256 GB (UFS 2.2)	108 MP, f/1.9 + 8 MP, f/2.2 (ultrawide) + 2 MP, f/2.4 (macro)	16 MP, f/2.5	5000 mAh (Li-Po)	Android 11 (MIUI 13)	Android 13 (HyperOS)	Mirage Blue, Phantom White, Stealth Black
Redmi Note 11E Pro	veux	2201116SC	March 2022	Super AMOLED, 120 Hz Corning Gorilla Glass 5	6.67"	1080 x 2400 px (Full HD+, ~395 ppi)	Yes	Qualcomm Snapdragon 695 2x 2.2 GHz Cortex-A76 + 6x 1.7 GHz Cortex-A55	Adreno 619 @950 MHz	4 GB; 6 GB (LPDDR4X)	128 GB; 256 GB (UFS 2.2)	108 MP, f/1.9 + 8 MP, f/2.2 (ultrawide) + 2 MP, f/2.4 (macro)	16 MP, f/2.5	5000 mAh (Li-Po)	Android 11 (MIUI 13)	Android 13 (HyperOS)	Graphite Gray, Polar White, Atlantic Blue
Redmi Note 11E Global: Redmi 10 5G	light	22041219C	March 2022	IPS LCD, 90 Hz Corning Gorilla Glass 3	6.58"	1080 x 2400 px (Full HD+, ~395 ppi)	Yes	MediaTek Dimensity 700 2x 2.2 GHz Cortex-A76 + 6x 2.0 GHz Cortex-A55	Mali-G57 MC2 @950 MHz	4 GB; 6 GB (LPDDR4X)	128 GB (UFS 2.2)	50 MP, f/1.8 + 2 MP, f/2.4 (depth)	5 MP	5000 mAh (Li-Po)	Android 12 (MIUI 13)	Android 14 (HyperOS)	Gray, Silver, Atlantic Blue
Redmi Note 11S 5G	opal	22031116BG	April 2022	IPS LCD, 90 Hz Corning Gorilla Glass 3	6.6"	1080 x 2400 px (Full HD+, ~399 ppi)	Yes	MediaTek Dimensity 810 2x 2.4 GHz Cortex-A76 + 6x 2.0 GHz Cortex-A55	Mali-G57 MC2 @950 MHz	4 GB; 6 GB (LPDDR4X)	64 GB; 128 GB (UFS 2.2)	50 MP, f/1.8 + 8 MP, f/2.2 (ultrawide) 2 MP, f/2.4 (macro)	13 MP, f/2.4	5000 mAh (Li-Po)	Android 11 (MIUI 13)	Android 13 (HyperOS)	Midnight Black, Twilight Blue, Star Blue
Redmi Note 11SE Global: Poco M3 Pro	camellia	M2103K19C	May 2022	IPS LCD, 90 Hz Corning Gorilla Glass 3	6.5"	1080 x 2400 px (Full HD+, ~405 ppi)	Yes	MediaTek Dimensity 700 2x 2.2 GHz Cortex-A76 + 6x 2.0 GHz Cortex-A55	Mali-G57 MC2 @950 MHz	4 GB; 8 GB (LPDDR4X)	128 GB (UFS 2.2)	48 MP, f/1.8 + 2 MP, f/2.4 (depth)	8 MP, f/2.0	5000 mAh (Li-Po)	Android 11 (MIUI 12)	Android 13 (MIUI 14)	Shadow Black, Space Blue
Redmi Note 11T Pro Global: Poco X4 GT; India: Redmi K50i	xaga	22041216C	May 2022	IPS LCD, 144 Hz Corning Gorilla Glass 5	6.6"	1080 x 2460 px (Full HD+, ~407 ppi)	Yes	MediaTek Dimensity 8100 4x 2.85 GHz Cortex-A78 + 4x 2.0 GHz Cortex-A55	Mali-G610 MC6	6 GB; 8 GB 12 GB (LPDDR5)	128 GB; 256 GB 512 GB (UFS 3.1)	64 MP + 8 MP, f/2.2 (ultrawide) + 2 MP, f/2.4 (macro)	16 MP	5080 mAh (Li-Po)	Android 12 (MIUI 13)	Android 14 (HyperOS 2)	Atomic Silver, Time Blue, Midnight Black
Redmi Note 11T Pro+	xagapro	22041216UC	May 2022	IPS LCD, 144 Hz Corning Gorilla Glass 5	6.6"	1080 x 2460 px (Full HD+, ~407 ppi)	Yes	MediaTek Dimensity 8100 4x 2.85 GHz Cortex-A78 + 4x 2.0 GHz Cortex-A55	Mali-G610 MC6	8 GB (LPDDR5)	128 GB; 256 GB 512 GB (UFS 3.1)	64 MP + 8 MP, f/2.2 (ultrawide) + 2 MP, f/2.4 (macro)	16 MP	4400 mAh (Li-Po)	Android 12 (MIUI 13)	Android 14 (HyperOS 2)	Atomic Silver, Time Blue, Midnight Black, Astro Boy Limited Edition
Redmi Note 11 SE (India)	secret	22087RA4DI	August 2022	Super AMOLED Corning Gorilla Glass 3	6.43"	1080 x 2400 px (Full HD+, ~409 ppi)	No	Mediatek Helio G95 2x 2.05 GHz Cortex-A76 + 6x 2.0 GHz Cortex-A55	Mali-G76 MC4 @900 MHz	6 GB; 8 GB (LPDDR4X)	64 GB; 128 GB (UFS 2.2)	64 MP, f/1.9 + 8 MP, f/2.2 (ultrawide) + 2 MP, f/2.4 (macro) + 2 MP, f/2.4 (depth)	13 MP, f/2.5	5000 mAh (Li-Po)	Android 11 (MIUI 12.5)	Android 13 (MIUI 14)	Thunder Purple, Cosmic White, Shadow Black, Bifrost Blue
Redmi Note 11R Global: Poco M4 5G	lightcm	22095RA98C	September 2022	IPS LCD, 90 Hz	6.58"	1080 x 2408 px (Full HD+, ~401 ppi)	Yes	MediaTek Dimensity 700 2x 2.2 GHz Cortex-A76 + 6x 2.0 GHz Cortex-A55	Mali-G57 MC2 @900 MHz	4 GB; 6 GB; 8 GB (LPDDR4X)	128 GB (UFS 2.2)	13 MP, f/2.2 + 2 MP, f/2.4 (depth)	5 MP, f/2.2	5000 mAh (Li-Po)	Android 12 (MIUI 13)	Android 14 (HyperOS)	Black, Blue, Gray
Redmi Note 12 5G (China)	sunstone	22101317C	November 2022	AMOLED, 120 Hz Corning Gorilla Glass 3	6.67"	1080 x 2400 px (Full HD+, ~395 ppi)	Yes	Qualcomm Snapdragon 4 Gen 1 2x 2.0 GHz Cortex-A78 + 6x 1.8 GHz Cortex-A55	Adreno 619	4 GB; 6 GB; 8 GB (LPDDR4X)	128 GB; 256 GB (UFS 2.2)	48 MP + 2 MP, f/2.4 (depth)	8 MP, f/2.0	5000 mAh (Li-Po)	Android 12 (MIUI 13)	Android 14 (HyperOS 2)	Midnight Black, Mirror White, Time Blue
Redmi Note 12 Pro 5G	ruby	22101316C (China) 22101316G (Global) 22101316I (India)	November 2022	OLED, 120 Hz Corning Gorilla Glass 5	6.67"	1080 x 2400 px (Full HD+, ~395 ppi)	Yes	MediaTek Dimensity 1080 2x 2.6 GHz Cortex-A78 + 6x 2.0 GHz Cortex-A55	Mali-G68 MC4 @900 MHz	6 GB; 8 GB 12 GB (LPDDR4X)	128 GB; 256 GB (UFS 2.2)	50 MP, f/1.9 + 8 MP, f/1.9 (ultrawide) + 2 MP, f/2.4 (macro)	16 MP	5000 mAh (Li-Po)	Android 12 (MIUI 13)	Android 14 (HyperOS 2)	Black, Blue, White, Violet
Redmi Note 12 Pro+	rubyplus	22101316UCP (China) 2101316UG (Global) 22101316UP (India)	November 2022	OLED, 120 Hz Corning Gorilla Glass 5	6.67"	1080 x 2400 px (Full HD+, ~395 ppi)	Yes	MediaTek Dimensity 1080 2x 2.6 GHz Cortex-A78 + 6x 2.0 GHz Cortex-A55	Mali-G68 MC4 @900 MHz	8 GB; 12 GB (LPDDR4X)	256 GB (UFS 2.2)	200 MP, f/1.7 + 8 MP, f/1.9 (ultrawide) + 2 MP, f/2.4 (macro)	16 MP	5000 mAh (Li-Po)	Android 12 (MIUI 13)	Android 14 (HyperOS 2)	Black, Blue, White, Trend edition, YIBO EDITION
Redmi Note 12 Discovery	rubypro	22101316UC	November 2022	OLED, 120 Hz Corning Gorilla Glass 5	6.67"	1080 x 2400 px (Full HD+, ~395 ppi)	Yes	MediaTek Dimensity 1080 2x 2.6 GHz Cortex-A78 + 6x 2.0 GHz Cortex-A55	Mali-G68 MC4 @900 MHz	8 GB (LPDDR4X)	256 GB (UFS 2.2)	200 MP, f/1.7 + 8 MP, f/1.9 (ultrawide) + 2 MP, f/2.4 (macro)	16 MP	4300 mAh (Li-Po)	Android 12 (MIUI 13)	Android 14 (HyperOS 2)	Black
Redmi Note 12 Pro Speed Global: Poco X5 Pro	redwood	22101320C	December 2022	OLED, 120 Hz Corning Gorilla Glass 5	6.67"	1080 x 2400 px (Full HD+, ~395 ppi)	Yes	Qualcomm Snapdragon 778G 1x 2.4 GHz Cortex-A78 + 3x 2.2 GHz Cortex-A78 + 4x 1.9 GHz Cortex-A55	Adreno 642L	6 GB; 8 GB 12 GB (LPDDR4X)	128 GB; 256 GB (UFS 2.2)	108 MP, f/1.9 + 8 MP, f/1.9 (ultrawide) + 2 MP, f/2.4 (macro)	16 MP	5000 mAh (Li-Po)	Android 12 (MIUI 14)	Android 14 (HyperOS 2)	Midnight Black, Time Blue, Shimmer Green
Redmi Note 12 5G	sunstone	22111317G (Global) 22111317I (India)	January 2023	AMOLED, 120 Hz Corning Gorilla Glass 3	6.67"	1080 x 2400 px (Full HD+, ~395 ppi)	Yes	Qualcomm Snapdragon 4 Gen 1 2x 2.0 GHz Cortex-A78 + 6x 1.8 GHz Cortex-A55	Adreno 619 @950 MHz	4 GB; 6 GB (LPDDR4X)	128 GB; 256 GB (UFS 2.2)	48 MP + 8 MP, f/2.2 (ultrawide) + 2 MP, f/2.4 (macro)	13 MP, f/2.5	5000 mAh (Li-Po)	Android 12 (MIUI 13)	Android 14 (HyperOS 2)	Matte Black, Mystique Blue, Frosted Green
Redmi Note 12	tapas	23021RAAEG (Global) 23028RA60L (Latin America)	March 2023	AMOLED, 120 Hz Corning Gorilla Glass 3	6.67"	1080 x 2400 px (Full HD+, ~395 ppi)	No	Qualcomm Snapdragon 685 4x 2.8 GHz Cortex-A73 + 4x 1.9 GHz Cortex-A55	Adreno 610	4 GB (LPDDR4X)	64 GB 128 GB (UFS 2.2)	50 MP, f/1.8 + 8 MP, f/2.2 (ultrawide) + 2 MP, f/2.4 (macro)	13 MP, f/2.5	5000 mAh (Li-Po)	Android 13 (MIUI 14)	Android 15 (HyperOS 2.2)	Onyx Gray, Ice Blue, Mint Green, Sunrise Gold
Redmi Note 12	topaz	23021RAA2Y (NFC)	March 2023	AMOLED, 120 Hz Corning Gorilla Glass 3	6.67"	1080 x 2400 px (Full HD+, ~395 ppi)	No	Qualcomm Snapdragon 685 4x 2.8 GHz Cortex-A73 + 4x 1.9 GHz Cortex-A55	Adreno 610	4 GB (LPDDR4X)	64 GB 128 GB (UFS 2.2)	50 MP, f/1.8 + 8 MP, f/2.2 (ultrawide) + 2 MP, f/2.4 (macro)	13 MP, f/2.5	5000 mAh (Li-Po)	Android 13 (MIUI 14)	Android 15 (HyperOS 2.2)	Onyx Gray, Ice Blue, Mint Green, Sunrise Gold
Redmi Note 12 Turbo Global: Poco F5	marble	23049RAD8C	March 2023	AMOLED, 120 Hz Corning Gorilla Glass 5	6.67"	1080 x 2400 px (Full HD+, ~395 ppi)	Yes	Qualcomm Snapdragon 7+ Gen 2 1x 2.91 GHz Cortex-X2 + 3x 2.49 GHz Cortex-A710 + 4x 1.8 GHz Cortex-A510	Adreno 725	8 GB 12 GB 16 GB (LPDDR5)	256 GB; 512 GB 1 TB (UFS 3.1)	64 MP, f/1.8 + 8 MP, f/2.2 (ultrawide) + 2 MP, f/2.4 (macro)	16 MP, f/2.5	5000 mAh (Li-Po)	Android 13 (MIUI 14)	Android 15 (HyperOS3)	Star Sea Blue, Carbon Fiber Black, Ice Feather White, Harry Potter Edition
Redmi Note 12 Pro	sweet_k6a	2209116AG	April 2023	AMOLED, 120 Hz Corning Gorilla Glass 5	6.67"	1080 x 2400 px (Full HD+, ~395 ppi)	No	Qualcomm Snapdragon 732G 2x 2.3 GHz Cortex-A76 + 6x 1.8 GHz Cortex-A55	Adreno 618 @825 MHz	6 GB; 8 GB (LPDDR4X)	128 GB; 256 GB (UFS 2.2)	108 MP, f/1.9 + 8 MP, f/2.2 (ultrawide) + 2 MP, f/2.4 (macro) + 2 MP, f/2.4 (depth)	16 MP, f/2.4	5000 mAh (Li-Po)	Android 11 (MIUI 13)	Android 13 (HyperOS)	Star Blue, Graphite Gray, Polar White, Ice Blue
Redmi Note 12S	ocean	2303CRA44A (Global) 2303ERA42L (Latin America)	April 2023	AMOLED, 90 Hz Corning Gorilla Glass 3	6.43"	1080 x 2400 px (Full HD+, ~409 ppi)	No	Mediatek Helio G96 2x 2.05 GHz Cortex-A76 + 6x 2.0 GHz Cortex-A55	Mali-G57 MC2	6 GB; 8 GB (LPDDR4X)	128 GB; 256 GB (UFS 2.2)	108 MP, f/1.9 + 8 MP, f/2.2 (ultrawide) + 2 MP, f/2.4 (macro)	16 MP, f/2.4	5000 mAh (Li-Po)	Android 13 (MIUI 14)	Android 15 (HyperOS 2.2)	Onyx Black, Ice Blue, Pearl Green
Redmi Note 12S	sea	23030RC7Y (NFC)	April 2023	AMOLED, 90 Hz Corning Gorilla Glass 3	6.43"	1080 x 2400 px (Full HD+, ~409 ppi)	No	Mediatek Helio G96 2x 2.05 GHz Cortex-A76 + 6x 2.0 GHz Cortex-A55	Mali-G57 MC2	6 GB; 8 GB (LPDDR4X)	128 GB; 256 GB (UFS 2.2)	108 MP, f/1.9 + 8 MP, f/2.2 (ultrawide) + 2 MP, f/2.4 (macro)	16 MP, f/2.4	5000 mAh (Li-Po)	Android 13 (MIUI 14)	Android 15 (HyperOS 2.2)	Onyx Black, Ice Blue, Pearl Green
Redmi Note 12R Pro	sunstone	22101317C	April 2023	AMOLED, 120 Hz Corning Gorilla Glass 3	6.67"	1080 x 2400 px (Full HD+, ~395 ppi)	Yes	Qualcomm Snapdragon 4 Gen 1 2x 2.0 GHz Cortex-A78 + 6x 1.8 GHz Cortex-A55	Adreno 619 @950 MHz	12 GB (LPDDR4X)	256 GB (UFS 2.2)	48 MP + 2 MP, f/2.4 (depth)	8 MP, f/2.0	5000 mAh (Li-Po)	Android 12 (MIUI 13)	Android 14 (HyperOS 2)	Morning Light Gold, Midnight Black, Mirror White
Redmi Note 12T Pro	pearl	23054RA19C	June 2023	IPS LCD, 144 Hz Corning Gorilla Glass 5	6.6"	1080 x 2460 px (Full HD+, ~407 ppi)	Yes	MediaTek Dimensity 8200 Ultra 1x 3.1 GHz Cortex-A78 + 3x 3 GHz Cortex-A78 + 4x 2 GHz Cortex-A55	Mali-G610 MC6	8 GB 12 GB (LPDDR5)	256 GB; 512 GB (UFS 3.1)	64 MP, f/1.8 + 8 MP, f/2.2 (ultrawide) + 2 MP, f/2.4 (macro)	16 MP	5080 mAh (Li-Po)	Android 13 (MIUI 14)	Android 15 (HyperOS 2.2)	Clear Sea Blue, Ice Fog White, Carbon Fiber Black
Redmi Note 12R Also: Redmi 12 5G, Redmi 12R	sky	23076RA4BC	June 2023	IPS LCD, 90 Hz Corning Gorilla Glass 3	6.79"	1080 x 2460 px (Full HD+, ~396 ppi)	Yes	Qualcomm Snapdragon 4 Gen 2 2x 2.2 GHz Cortex-A78 + 6x 2 GHz Cortex-A55	Adreno 613	4 GB 6 GB; 8 GB (LPDDR4X)	128 GB; 256 GB (UFS 2.2)	50 MP, f/1.8 + 2 MP, f/2.4 (macro)	5 MP, f/2.2	5000 mAh (Li-Po)	Android 13 (MIUI 14)	Android 15 (HyperOS 2.2)	Midnight Black, Time Blue, Sky Fantasy
Redmi Note 13 5G (China)	gold	2312DRAABC	September 2023	AMOLED, 120 Hz Corning Gorilla Glass 5	6.67"	1080 x 2400 px (Full HD+, ~395 ppi)	Yes	MediaTek Dimensity 6080 2x 2.4 GHz Cortex-A76 + 6x 2.0 GHz Cortex-A55	Mali-G57 MC2	6 GB; 8 GB 12 GB (LPDDR4X)	128 GB; 256 GB (UFS 2.2)	108 MP, f/1.75 + 2 MP, f/2.4 (depth)	16 MP, f/2.45	5000 mAh (Li-Po)	Android 13 (MIUI 14)	Android 15 (HyperOS 3)	Star Sand White, Midnight Black, Time Blue
Redmi Note 13 Pro 5G	garnet	2312CRAD3C (China) 2312DRA50C (China) 2312DRA50G (Global) 2312DRA50I (India)	September 2023	AMOLED, 120 Hz Corning Gorilla Glass Victus	6.67"	1220 x 2712 px (Full HD+, ~446 ppi)	Yes	Qualcomm Snapdragon 7s Gen 2 4x 2.4 GHz Cortex-A78 + 4x 1.95 GHz Cortex-A55	Adreno 710	8 GB 12 GB; 16 GB (LPDDR5)	128 GB; 256 GB; 512 GB (UFS 3.1)	200 MP, f/1.65 + 8 MP, f/2.2 (ultrawide) + 2 MP, f/2.4 (macro)	16 MP, f/2.45	5100 mAh (Li-Po)	Android 13 (MIUI 14)	Android 16 (HyperOS 3.1)	Midnight Black, Time Blue / Fusion Teal, Aurora / Coral Purple / Light Dream Space, Arctic / Star Sand White
Redmi Note 13 Pro+	zircon	23090RA98C (China) 23090RA98G (Global) 23090RA98I (India)	September 2023	AMOLED, 120 Hz Corning Gorilla Glass Victus	6.67"	1220 x 2712 px (Full HD+, ~446 ppi)	Yes	MediaTek Dimensity 7200 Ultra 2x 2.8 GHz Cortex-A715 + 6x 2 GHz Cortex-A510	Mali-G610 MC4	8 GB 12 GB; 16 GB (LPDDR5)	256 GB; 512 GB (UFS 3.1)	200 MP, f/1.65 + 8 MP, f/2.2 (ultrawide) + 2 MP, f/2.4 (macro)	16 MP, f/2.45	5000 mAh (Li-Po)	Android 13 (MIUI 14)	Android 16 (HyperOS 3.1)	Fushion / Midnight Black, Moonlight / Fushion / Mirror White, Fushion Purple / Light Dream Space, Aurora Purple, Aape Edition
Redmi Note 13R Pro India: Poco X6 Neo	gold	2311FRAFDC	November 2023	AMOLED, 120 Hz Corning Gorilla Glass 5	6.67"	1080 x 2400 px (Full HD+, ~395 ppi)	Yes	MediaTek Dimensity 6080 2x 2.4 GHz Cortex-A76 + 6x 2.0 GHz Cortex-A55	Mali-G57 MC2	12 GB (LPDDR4X)	256 GB (UFS 2.2)	108 MP, f/1.75 + 2 MP, f/2.4 (depth)	16 MP, f/2.45	5000 mAh (Li-Po)	Android 13 (MIUI 14)	Android 15 (HyperOS 3)	Morning Light Gold, Midnight Black, Time Blue
Redmi Note 13 5G	gold	2312DRAABI (India)	January 2024	AMOLED, 120 Hz Corning Gorilla Glass 5	6.67"	1080 x 2400 px (Full HD+, ~395 ppi)	Yes	MediaTek Dimensity 6080 2x 2.4 GHz Cortex-A76 + 6x 2.0 GHz Cortex-A55	Mali-G57 MC2	6 GB; 8 GB 12 GB (LPDDR4X)	128 GB; 256 GB (UFS 2.2)	108 MP, f/1.75 + 8 MP, f/2.2 (ultrawide) + 2 MP, f/2.4 (macro)	16 MP, f/2.45	5000 mAh (Li-Po)	Android 13 (MIUI 14)	Android 15 (HyperOS 3)	Stealth Black, Prism Gold, Arctic White, Chromatic Purple
Redmi Note 13 5G	iron	2312DRAABG (Global)	January 2024	AMOLED, 120 Hz Corning Gorilla Glass 5	6.67"	1080 x 2400 px (Full HD+, ~395 ppi)	Yes	MediaTek Dimensity 6080 2x 2.4 GHz Cortex-A76 + 6x 2.0 GHz Cortex-A55	Mali-G57 MC2	6 GB; 8 GB 12 GB (LPDDR4X)	128 GB; 256 GB (UFS 2.2)	108 MP, f/1.75 + 8 MP, f/2.2 (ultrawide) + 2 MP, f/2.4 (macro)	16 MP, f/2.45	5000 mAh (Li-Po)	Android 13 (MIUI 14)	Android 15 (HyperOS 3)	Graphite Black, Arctic White, Ocean Teal
Redmi Note 13	sapphire	23129RAA4G 23129RA5FL (Latin America)	January 2024	AMOLED, 120 Hz Corning Gorilla Glass 3	6.67"	1080 x 2400 px (Full HD+, ~395 ppi)	No	Qualcomm Snapdragon 685 4x 2.8 GHz Cortex-A73 + 4x 1.9 GHz Cortex-A55	Adreno 610	6 GB; 8 GB (LPDDR4X)	128 GB; 256 GB (UFS 2.2)	108 MP, f/1.75 + 8 MP, f/2.2 (ultrawide) + 2 MP, f/2.4 (macro)	16 MP, f/2.45	5000 mAh (Li-Po)	Android 13 (MIUI 14)	Android 15 (HyperOS 2.2)	Midnight Black, Mint Green, Ice Blue, Ocean Sunset
Redmi Note 13 NFC	sapphiren	23124RA7EO	January 2024	AMOLED, 120 Hz Corning Gorilla Glass 3	6.67"	1080 x 2400 px (Full HD+, ~395 ppi)	No	Qualcomm Snapdragon 685 4x 2.8 GHz Cortex-A73 + 4x 1.9 GHz Cortex-A55	Adreno 610	6 GB; 8 GB (LPDDR4X)	128 GB; 256 GB (UFS 2.2)	108 MP, f/1.75 + 8 MP, f/2.2 (ultrawide) + 2 MP, f/2.4 (macro)	16 MP, f/2.45	5000 mAh (Li-Po)	Android 13 (MIUI 14)	Android 15 (HyperOS 2.2)	Midnight Black, Mint Green, Ice Blue, Ocean Sunset
Redmi Note 13 Pro	emerald	23117RA68G	January 2024	AMOLED, 120 Hz Corning Gorilla Glass 5	6.67"	1080 x 2400 px (Full HD+, ~395 ppi)	No	MediaTek Helio G99 Ultra 2x 2.2 GHz Cortex-A76 + 6x 2.0 GHz Cortex-A55	Mali-G57 MC2 @1 GHz	8 GB 12 GB (LPDDR4X)	256 GB; 512 GB (UFS 2.2)	200 MP, f/1.65 + 8 MP, f/2.2 (ultrawide) + 2 MP, f/2.4 (macro)	16 MP, f/2.45	5000 mAh (Li-Po)	Android 13 (MIUI 14)	Android 16 (HyperOS 3.1)	Midnight Black, Forest Green, Lavander Purple
Redmi Note 13R	breeze	2406ERN9CC	May 2024	IPS LCD, 90 Hz Corning Gorilla Glass 3	6.79"	1080 x 2460 px (Full HD+, ~396 ppi)	Yes	Qualcomm Snapdragon 4 Gen 2 2x 2.2 GHz Cortex-A78 + 6x 2 GHz Cortex-A55	Adreno 613	6 GB; 8 GB 12 GB (LPDDR4X)	128 GB; 256 GB; 512 GB (UFS 2.2)	50 MP, f/1.8 + 2 MP, f/2.4 (macro)	8 MP	5000 mAh (Li-Po)	Android 14 (HyperOS)	Android 16 (HyperOS 3.1)	
Redmi Note 14 5G (China)	beryl	24094RAD4C	September 2024	AMOLED, 120 Hz Corning Gorilla Glass 5	6.67"	1080 x 2400 px (Full HD+, ~395 ppi)	Yes	MediaTek Dimensity 7025 Ultra 2x 2.5 GHz Cortex-A78 + 6x 2.0 GHz Cortex-A55	IMG BXM-8-256	6 GB; 8 GB 12 GB (LPDDR4X)	128 GB; 256 GB (UFS 2.2)	50 MP, f/1.5 + 2 MP, f/2.4 (macro)	16 MP	5110 mAh (Li-Po)	Android 14 (HyperOS)	Android 16 (HyperOS 3.1)	Midnight Black, Starry White, Phantom Blue
Redmi Note 14 Pro 5G (China and India) Poco X7	malachite	24090RA29C (China) 24090RA29I (India)	September 2024	AMOLED, 120 Hz Corning Gorilla Glass Victus 2	6.67"	1220 x 2712 px (Full HD+, ~446 ppi)	Yes	MediaTek Dimensity 7300 Ultra 4x 2.5 GHz Cortex-A78 + 4x 2 GHz Cortex-A55	Mali-G615 MC2	8 GB 12 GB (LPDDR4X)	128 GB; 256 GB; 512 GB (UFS 2.2)	50 MP, f/1.5 + 8 MP, f/2.2 (ultrawide) + 2 MP, f/2.4 (macro)	20 MP, f/2.2	5500 mAh (Li-Ion Si/C)	Android 14 (HyperOS)	Android 16 (HyperOS 3.1)	Midnight / Titan Black, Mirror Porcelain White, Phantom / Ivy Green, Twilight / Phantom Purple, Good Luck Red
Redmi Note 14 Pro+ (China and India)	amethyst	24115RA8EC (China) 24115RA8EI (India)	September 2024	AMOLED, 120 Hz Corning Gorilla Glass Victus 2	6.67"	1220 x 2712 px (Full HD+, ~446 ppi)	Yes	Qualcomm Snapdragon 7s Gen 3 1x 2.5 GHz Cortex-A720 + 3x 2.4 GHz Cortex-A720 + 4x 1.8 GHz Cortex-A520	Adreno 710 @940 MHz	8 GB; 12 GB 18 GB (LPDDR4X / LPDDR5)	128 GB; 256 GB; 512 GB (UFS 2.2 / UFS 3.1)	50 MP, f/1.5 + 50 MP, f/2.0 (telephoto) + 8 MP, f/2.2 (ultrawide)	20 MP, f/2.2	6200 mAh (Li-Ion Si/C)	Android 14 (HyperOS)	Android 16 (HyperOS 3.1)	Midnight / Titan Black, Mirror Porcelain White, Star Sand Green, Phantom Purple, Spectre Blue
Redmi Note 14 5G (India)	beryl	24094RAD4I	December 2024	AMOLED, 120 Hz Corning Gorilla Glass 5	6.67"	1080 x 2400 px (Full HD+, ~395 ppi)	Yes	MediaTek Dimensity 7025 Ultra 2x 2.5 GHz Cortex-A78 + 6x 2.0 GHz Cortex-A55	IMG BXM-8-256	6 GB; 8 GB (LPDDR4X)	128 GB; 256 GB (UFS 2.2)	50 MP, f/1.5 + 8 MP, f/2.2 (ultrawide) + 2 MP, f/2.4 (macro)	20 MP, f/2.2	5110 mAh (Li-Po)	Android 14 (HyperOS)	Android 16 (HyperOS 3.1)	Titan Black, Mystique White, Phantom Purple, Ivy Green
Redmi Note 14	tanzanite	24117RN76G (Global) 24117RN76E (Global) 24117RN76O (NFC) 24117RN76L (Latin America)	January 2025	AMOLED, 120 Hz Corning Gorilla Glass 5	6.67"	1080 x 2400 px (Full HD+, ~395 ppi)	No	MediaTek Helio G99 Ultra 2x 2.2 GHz Cortex-A76 + 6x 2.0 GHz Cortex-A55	Mali-G57 MC2 @1 GHz	6 GB; 8 GB (LPDDR4X)	128 GB; 256 GB (UFS 2.2)	108 MP, f/1.7 + 2 MP, f/2.4 (macro) + 2 MP, f/2.4 (depth)	20 MP, f/2.2	5500 mAh (Li-Po)	Android 14 (HyperOS)	Android 16 (HyperOS 3.1)	Midnight Black, Lavender Purple, Coral Green
Redmi Note 14 5G	beryl/citrine	24094RAD4G	January 2025	AMOLED, 120 Hz Corning Gorilla Glass 5	6.67"	1080 x 2400 px (Full HD+, ~395 ppi)	Yes	MediaTek Dimensity 7025 Ultra 2x 2.5 GHz Cortex-A78 + 6x 2.0 GHz Cortex-A55	IMG BXM-8-256	6 GB; 8 GB 12 GB (LPDDR4X)	128 GB; 256 GB 512 GB (UFS 2.2)	108 MP, f/1.7 + 8 MP, f/2.2 (ultrawide) + 2 MP, f/2.4 (macro)	20 MP, f/2.2	5110 mAh (Li-Po)	Android 14 (HyperOS)	Android 16 (HyperOS 3.1)	Midnight Black, Lavender Purple, Coral Green
Redmi Note 14 Pro	obsidian	24116RACCG	January 2025		6.67"	1080 x 2400 px (Full HD+, ~395 ppi)	No	MediaTek Helio G100 Ultra 2x 2.2 GHz Cortex-A76 + 6x 2.0 GHz Cortex-A55	Mali-G57 MC2 @1 GHz	8 GB 12 GB (LPDDR4X)	128 GB; 256 GB 512 GB (UFS 2.2)	200 MP, f/1.65 + 8 MP, f/2.2 (ultrawide) + 2 MP, f/2.4 (macro)	32 MP, f/2.2	5500 mAh (Li-Po)	Android 14 (HyperOS)	Android 16 (HyperOS 3.1)	Midnight Black, Aurora Purple, Ocean Blue
Redmi Note 14 Pro 5G	malachite	24090RA29G	January 2025	AMOLED, 120 Hz Corning Gorilla Glass Victus 2	6.67"	1220 x 2712 px (Full HD+, ~446 ppi)	Yes	MediaTek Dimensity 7300 Ultra 4x 2.5 GHz Cortex-A78 + 4x 2 GHz Cortex-A55	Mali-G615 MC2	8 GB 12 GB (LPDDR4X)	256 GB 512 GB(UFS 2.2)	200 MP, f/1.65 + 8 MP, f/2.2 (ultrawide) + 2 MP, f/2.4 (macro)	20 MP, f/2.2	5110 mAh (Li-Po)	Android 14 (HyperOS)	Android 16 (HyperOS 3.1)	Midnight Black, Lavender Purple, Coral Green
Redmi Note 14 Pro+	amethyst	24115RA8EG	January 2025	AMOLED, 120 Hz Corning Gorilla Glass Victus 2	6.67"	1220 x 2712 px (Full HD+, ~446 ppi)	Yes	Qualcomm Snapdragon 7s Gen 3 1x 2.5 GHz Cortex-A720 + 3x 2.4 GHz Cortex-A720 + 4x 1.8 GHz Cortex-A520	Adreno 710 @940 MHz	8 GB 12 GB (LPDDR4X)	256 GB 512 GB(UFS 2.2)	200 MP, f/1.65 + 8 MP, f/2.2 (ultrawide) + 2 MP, f/2.4 (macro)	20 MP, f/2.2	5110 mAh (Li-Po)	Android 14 (HyperOS)	Android 16 (HyperOS 3.1)	Midnight Black, Lavender Purple, Frost Blue, Sand Gold
Redmi Note 14S	emerald_r	2502FRA65G	March 2025	AMOLED, 120 Hz Corning Gorilla Glass 5	6.67"	1080 x 2400 px (Full HD+, ~395 ppi)	No	MediaTek Helio G99 Ultra 2x 2.2 GHz Cortex-A76 + 6x 2.0 GHz Cortex-A55	Mali-G57 MC2 @1 GHz	8 GB 12 GB (LPDDR4X)	128 GB; 256 GB 512 GB (UFS 2.2)	200 MP, f/1.65 + 8 MP, f/2.2 (ultrawide) + 2 MP, f/2.4 (macro)	16 MP, f/2.45	5000 mAh (Li-Po)	Android 14 (HyperOS)	Android 16 (HyperOS 3.1)	Midnight Black, Aurora Purple, Ocean Blue
Redmi Note 15 5G (China)			August 2025	AMOLED, 120 Hz Xiaomi Dragon Crystal Glass	6.77"	1080 x 2392 px (Full HD+, ~388 ppi)	Yes	Qualcomm Snapdragon6 Gen 3 4x 2.4 GHz Cortex-A78 + 4x 1.8 GHz Cortex-A55	Adreno 710	6 GB 8 GB 12 GB (LPDDR4X)	128 GB 256 GB (UFS 2.2)	50 MP, f/1.8 + 2 MP (depth)	8 MP	5800 mAh (Li-Ion Si/C)	Android 15 (HyperOS 2.2)	Android 16 (HyperOS 3.1)	Midnight Black, Star White, Sky Blue
Redmi Note 15 Pro 5G (China)			August 2025	AMOLED, 120 Hz Xiaomi Dragon Crystal Glass	6.83"	1220 x 2772 px (Full HD+, ~443 ppi)	Yes	MediaTek Dimensity 7400 Ultra 4x 2.6 GHz Cortex-A78 + 4x 2 GHz Cortex-A55	Mali-G615 MC2	8 GB 12 GB (LPDDR4X)	256 GB 512 GB (UFS 2.2)	50 MP, f/1.5 + 8 MP, f/2.2 (ultrawide) + 2 MP, f/2.4 (macro)	20 MP, f/2.2	7000 mAh (Li-Ion Si/C)	Android 15 (HyperOS 2.2)	Android 16 (HyperOS 3.1)	Black, White, Purple, Blue
Redmi Note 15 Pro+ (China)			August 2025	AMOLED, 120 Hz Xiaomi Dragon Crystal Glass	6.83"	1220 x 2772 px (Full HD+, ~443 ppi)	Yes	Qualcomm Snapdragon 7s Gen 4 1x 2.7 GHz Cortex-A720 + 3x 2.4 GHz Cortex-A720 + 4x 1.8 GHz Cortex-A520	Adreno 810	12 GB 16 GB (LPDDR4X)	256 GB 512 GB 1 TB (UFS 2.2)	50 MP, f/1.6 + 50 MP, f/2.2 (telephoto) + 8 MP, f/2.2 (ultrawide)	32 MP	7000 mAh (Li-Ion Si/C)	Android 15 (HyperOS 2.2)	Android 16 (HyperOS 3.1)	Black, White, Purple, Blue
Redmi Note 15			December 2025	AMOLED, 120 Hz	6.77"	1080 x 2392 px (Full HD+, ~388 ppi)	No	MediaTek Helio G100 Ultra 2x 2.2 GHz Cortex-A76 + 6x 2.0 GHz Cortex-A55	Mali-G57 MC2 @1 GHz	6 GB 8 GB (LPDDR4X)	128 GB 256 GB 512 GB (UFS 2.2)	108 MP, f/1.7 + 2 MP, f/2.4 (macro) + 2 MP, f/2.4 (depth)	20 MP, f/2.2	6000 mAh (Li-Po)	Android 15 (HyperOS 2.2)	Android 16 (HyperOS 3.1)	Midnight Black, Lavender Purple, Coral Green
Redmi Note 15 5G			December 2025	AMOLED, 120 Hz	6.77"	1080 x 2392 px (Full HD+, ~388 ppi)	Yes	Qualcomm Snapdragon6 Gen 3 4x 2.4 GHz Cortex-A78 + 4x 1.8 GHz Cortex-A55	Adreno 710	6 GB 8 GB 12 GB (LPDDR4X)	128 GB 256 GB 512 GB (UFS 2.2)	108 MP, f/1.7 + 8 MP, f/2.2 (ultrawide) + 2 MP, f/2.4 (macro)	20 MP, f/2.2	5520 mAh (Li-Po)	Android 15 (HyperOS 2.2)	Android 16 (HyperOS 3.1)	Midnight Black, Lavender Purple, Coral Green
Redmi Note 15 Pro			December 2025	AMOLED, 120 Hz Corning Gorilla Glass Victus 2	6.77"	1080 x 2392 px (Full HD+, ~388 ppi)	No	MediaTek Helio G200 Ultra 2x 2.2 GHz Cortex-A76 + 6x 2.0 GHz Cortex-A55	Mali-G57 MC2 @1.1 GHz	8 GB 12 GB (LPDDR4X)	256 GB 512 GB(UFS 2.2)	200 MP, f/1.7 + 8 MP, f/2.2 (ultrawide) + 2 MP, f/2.4 (macro)	32 MP, f/2.2	6500 mAh (Li-Po)	Android 15 (HyperOS 2.2)	Android 16 (HyperOS 3.1)	Midnight Black, Aurora Purple, Ocean Blue
Redmi Note 15 Pro 5G			December 2025	AMOLED, 120 Hz Corning Gorilla Glass Victus 2	6.83"	1220 x 2772 px (Full HD+, ~443 ppi)	Yes	MediaTek Dimensity 7400 Ultra 4x 2.6 GHz Cortex-A78 + 4x 2 GHz Cortex-A55	Mali-G615 MC2	8 GB 12 GB (LPDDR4X)	128 GB 256 GB 512 GB(UFS 2.2)	200 MP, f/1.7 + 8 MP, f/2.2 (ultrawide) + 2 MP, f/2.4 (macro)	20 MP, f/2.2	6580 mAh (Li-Po)	Android 15 (HyperOS 2.2)	Android 16 (HyperOS 3.1)	Midnight Black, Lavender Purple, Coral Green
Redmi Note 15 Pro+			December 2025	AMOLED, 120 Hz Corning Gorilla Glass Victus 2	6.83"	1220 x 2772 px (Full HD+, ~443 ppi)	Yes	Qualcomm Snapdragon 7s Gen 4 1x 2.7 GHz Cortex-A720 + 3x 2.4 GHz Cortex-A720 + 4x 1.8 GHz Cortex-A520	Adreno 810	8 GB 12 GB (LPDDR4X)	256 GB 512 GB(UFS 2.2)	200 MP, f/1.7 + 8 MP, f/2.2 (ultrawide) + 2 MP, f/2.4 (macro)	32 MP, f/2.2	6500 mAh (Li-Po)	Android 15 (HyperOS 2.2)	Android 16 (HyperOS 3.1)	Midnight Black, Lavender Purple, Frost Blue, Sand Gold
Redmi Note 15 Special			April 2026	AMOLED, 120 Hz	6.77"	1080 x 2392 px (Full HD+, ~388 ppi)	Yes	Qualcomm Snapdragon6 Gen 3 4x 2.4 GHz Cortex-A78 + 4x 1.8 GHz Cortex-A55	Adreno 710	6 GB 8 GB (LPDDR4X)	128 GB 256 GB (UFS 2.2)	50 MP, f/1.8	20 MP, f/2.2	5800 mAh (Li-Po)	Android 15 (HyperOS 2.2)	Android 16 (HyperOS 3.1)	Midnight Black, Aurora Purple, Ocean Blue

=== Redmi Turbo Series ===
Model	Codename	Model number	Release date	Display type	Display size	Display resolution	5G support	SoC	GPU	RAM	Internal storage	Camera		Battery	Operating system		Colours
Model	Codename	Model number	Release date	Display type	Display size	Display resolution	5G support	SoC	GPU	RAM	Internal storage	Rear	Front	Battery	Initial	Current	Colours
Redmi Turbo 3 Global: POCO F6	peridot	24069RA21C	April 2024	AMOLED, 120 Hz Corning Gorilla Glass Victus	6.67"	1220 x 2712 px (~446 ppi)	Yes	Qualcomm Snapdragon 8s Gen 3 1x 3.0 GHz Cortex-X4 + 4x 2.8 GHz Cortex-A720 + 3x 2.0 GHz Cortex-A520	Adreno 735 @1.1 GHz	12 GB; 16 GB (LPDDR5X)	256 GB; 512 GB; 1 TB (UFS 4.0)	50 MP, f/1.6 + 8 MP, f/2.2 (ultrawide)	20 MP, f/2.2	5000 mAh (Li-Po)	Android 14 (HyperOS)	Android 16 (HyperOS 3.1)	Ice Titanium, Green Blade, Smoky Quartz, Harry Potter Edition
Redmi Turbo 4 Global: POCO X7 Pro	rodin	24129RT7CC	January 2025	AMOLED, 120 Hz Corning Gorilla Glass 7i	6.67"	1220 x 2712 px (~446 ppi)	Yes	MediaTek Dimensity 8400 Ultra 1x 3.25 GHz Cortex-A725 + 3x 3.0 GHz Cortex-A725 + 4x 2.1 GHz Cortex-A725	Mali-G720 MC7	12 GB; 16 GB (LPDDR5X)	256 GB; 512 GB (UFS 4.0)	50 MP, f/1.5 + 8 MP, f/2.2 (ultrawide)	20 MP, f/2.2	6550 mAh (Si/C Li-Ion)	Android 15 (HyperOS 2)	Android 16 (HyperOS 3.1)	Shadow Black, Shallow Sea Green, Auspicious Cloud White
Redmi Turbo 4 Pro Global: POCO F7	onyx	25053RT47C	April 2025	AMOLED, 120 Hz	6.83"	1280 x 2772 px (~447 ppi)	Yes	Qualcomm Snapdragon 8s Gen 4 1x 3.21 GHz Cortex-X4 + 3x 3.0 GHz Cortex-A720 + 2x 2.8 GHz Cortex-A720 + 2x 2.0 GHz Cortex-A720	Adreno 825	12 GB; 16 GB (LPDDR5X)	256 GB; 512 GB; 1 TB (UFS 4.1)	50 MP, f/1.5 + 8 MP, f/2.2 (ultrawide)	20 MP, f/2.2	7550 mAh (Si/C Li-Ion)	Android 15 (HyperOS 2)	Android 16 (HyperOS 3.1)	Black, Green, White, Harry Potter Edition
Model	Codename	Model number	Release date	Display type	Display size	Display resolution	5G support	SoC	GPU	RAM	Internal storage	Rear	Front	Battery	Initial	Current	Colours
Model	Codename	Model number	Release date	Display type	Display size	Display resolution	5G support	SoC	GPU	RAM	Internal storage	Camera		Battery	Operating system		Colours

=== Redmi K Series ===
Model	Codename	Model number	Release date	Display type	Display size	Display resolution	5G support	SoC	GPU	RAM	Internal storage	Camera		Battery	Operating system		Colours
Model	Codename	Model number	Release date	Display type	Display size	Display resolution	5G support	SoC	GPU	RAM	Internal storage	Rear	Front	Battery	Initial	Current	Colours
Redmi K20 Global: Mi 9T	davinci	M1903F10A (China) M1903F10C (China, carrier locked); M1903F10I (India)	June 2019	Super AMOLED Corning Gorilla Glass 5	6.39"	1080 x 2340 px (Full HD+, ~403 ppi)	No	Qualcomm Snapdragon 730 2x 2.2 GHz Cortex-A76 + 6x 1.8 GHz Cortex-A55	Adreno 618 @825 MHz	6 GB; 8 GB (LPDDR4X)	64 GB; 128 GB; 256 GB (UFS 2.1)	48 MP, f/1.8 + 8 MP, f/2.4 (telephoto) + 13 MP, f/2.4 (ultrawide)	20 MP, f/2.2 (Pop-Up)	4000 mAh (Li-Po)	Android 9 (MIUI 10)	Android 11 (MIUI 12.5)	Carbon black, Red flame, Glacier blue, Pearl White
Redmi K20 Pro Global: Mi 9T Pro	raphael	M1903F11A (Global); M1903F11I (India)	June 2019	Super AMOLED Corning Gorilla Glass 5	6.39"	1080 x 2340 px (Full HD+, ~403 ppi)	No	Qualcomm Snapdragon 855 1x 2.84 GHz Cortex-A76 + 3x 2.42 GHz Cortex-A76 + 4x 1.80 GHz Cortex-A55	Adreno 640 @585 MHz	6 GB; 8 GB (LPDDR4X)	64 GB; 128 GB; 256 GB (UFS 2.1)	48 MP, f/1.8 + 8 MP, f/2.4 (telephoto) + 13 MP, f/2.4 (ultrawide)	20 MP, f/2.2 (Pop-Up)	4000 mAh (Li-Po)	Android 9 (MIUI 10)	Android 11 (MIUI 12.5)	Carbon black, Red flame, Glacier blue, Pearl White
Redmi K20 Pro Premium	raphael	M1903F11A	September 2019	Super AMOLED Corning Gorilla Glass 5	6.39"	1080 x 2340 px (Full HD+, ~403 ppi)	No	Qualcomm Snapdragon 855+ 1x 2.96 GHz + 3x 2.42 GHz + 4x 1.80 GHz	Adreno 640 @675 MHz	8 GB; 12 GB (LPDDR4X)	128 GB; 256 GB; 512 GB (UFS 2.1)	48 MP, f/1.8 + 8 MP, f/2.4 (telephoto) + 13 MP, f/2.4 (ultrawide)	20 MP, f/2.2 (Pop-Up)	4000 mAh (Li-Po)	Android 9 (MIUI 10)	Android 11 (MIUI 12.5)	Carbon black, Red flame, Glacier blue, Pearl White
Redmi K30 India: POCO X2	phoenix	M1912G7BE; M1912G7BC	December 2019	IPS LCD, 120 Hz Corning Gorilla Glass 5	6.67"	1080 x 2400 px (Full HD+, ~395 ppi)	No	Qualcomm Snapdragon 730G 2x 2.2 GHz Cortex-A76 + 6x 1.8 GHz Cortex-A55	Adreno 618 @825 MHz	6 GB; 8 GB (LPDDR4X)	64 GB; 128 GB; 256 GB (UFS 2.1)	64 MP, f/1.9 + 8 MP, f/2.2 (ultrawide) + 2 MP, f/2.4 (macro) + 2 MP, f/2.4 (depth)	20 MP, f/2.2 + 2 MP, f/2.4 (Depth)	4500 mAh (Li-Po)	Android 10 (MIUI 11)	Android 12 (MIUI 13)	Blue, Red, Purple
Redmi K30 5G	picasso	M1912G7BE; M1912G7BC	January 2020	IPS LCD, 120 Hz Corning Gorilla Glass 5	6.67"	1080 x 2400 px (Full HD+, ~395 ppi)	Yes	Qualcomm Snapdragon 765G 1x 2.4 GHz Cortex-A76 + 1x 2.2 GHz Cortex-A76 + 6x 1.8 GHz Cortex-A55	Adreno 620 @625 MHz	6 GB; 8 GB (LPDDR4X)	64 GB; 128 GB; 256 GB (UFS 2.1)	64 MP, f/1.9 + 8 MP, f/2.2 (ultrawide) + 5 MP, f/2.4 (macro) + 2 MP, f/2.4 (depth)	20 MP, f/2.2 + 2 MP, f/2.4 (Depth)	4500 mAh (Li-Po)	Android 10 (MIUI 11)	Android 12 (MIUI 13)	Blue, Red, Purple, White
Redmi K30 Pro Global: POCO F2 Pro	lmi	M2006J10C	March 2020	Super AMOLED Corning Gorilla Glass 5	6.67"	1080 x 2400 px (Full HD+, ~395 ppi)	Yes	Qualcomm Snapdragon 865 1x 2.84 GHz + 3x 2.42 GHz + 4x 1.80 GHz	Adreno 650 @587 MHz	6 GB; 8 GB; 12 GB (LPDDR4X)	128 GB; 256 GB (UFS 3.0: 128 GB 6 GB RAM) (UFS 3.1: 128 GB 8/12 GB RAM, 256 GB 8 GB RAM)	64 MP, f/1.9 + 5 MP, f/2.2 (telephoto) + 13 MP, f/2.4 (ultrawide) + 2 MP, f/2.4 (depth)	20 MP (Pop-Up)	4700 mAh (Li-Po)	Android 10 (MIUI 11)	Android 12 (MIUI 14)	Neon Blue, Phantom White, Electric Purple, Cyber Gray
Redmi K30 Pro Zoom	lmi	M2001J11C M2001J11E	April 2020	Super AMOLED Corning Gorilla Glass 5	6.67"	1080 x 2400 px (Full HD+, ~395 ppi)	Yes	Qualcomm Snapdragon 865 1x 2.84 GHz + 3x 2.42 GHz + 4x 1.80 GHz	Adreno 650 @587 MHz	8 GB; 12 GB (LPDDR5)	128 GB; 256 GB; 512 GB (UFS 3.1)	64 MP + 8 MP, f/2.2 (telephoto) + 13 MP (ultrawide) + 2 MP (depth)	20 MP (Pop-Up)	4700 mAh (Li-Po)	Android 10 (MIUI 11)	Android 12 (MIUI 14)	Neon Blue, Phantom White, Electric Purple, Cyber Gray
Redmi K30 5G Speed	picasso	M1912G7BE	May 2020	IPS LCD, 120 Hz Corning Gorilla Glass 5	6.67"	1080 x 2400 px (Full HD+, ~395 ppi)	Yes	Qualcomm Snapdragon 768G 1x 2.8 GHz Cortex-A76 + 1x 2.2 GHz Cortex-A76 + 6x 1.8 GHz Cortex-A55	Adreno 620 @750 MHz	6 GB (LPDDR4X)	128 GB (UFS 2.1)	64 MP, f/1.9 + 8 MP, f/2.2 (ultrawide) + 5 MP, f/2.4 (macro) + 2 MP, f/2.4 (depth)	20 MP, f/2.2 + 2 MP, f/2.4 (depth)	4500 mAh (Li-Po)	Android 10 (MIUI 11)	Android 12 (MIUI 13)	Mint, Blue, Red, Purple, White
Redmi K30i 5G	picasso48m	M2001G7AC	June 2020	IPS LCD, 120 Hz Corning Gorilla Glass 5	6.67"	1080 x 2400 px (Full HD+, ~395 ppi)	Yes	Qualcomm Snapdragon 765G 1x 2.4 GHz Cortex-A76 + 1x 2.2 GHz Cortex-A76 + 6x 1.8 GHz Cortex-A55	Adreno 620 @625 MHz	6 GB; 8 GB (LPDDR4X)	128 GB; 256 GB (UFS 2.1)	48 MP, f/1.9 + 8 MP, f/2.2 (ultrawide) + 2 MP, f/2.4 (macro) + 2 MP, f/2.4 (depth)	20 MP, f/2.2 + 2 MP, f/2.4 (depth)	4500 mAh (Li-Po)	Android 10 (MIUI 11)	Android 12 (MIUI 13)	Blue, White, Red, Purple
Redmi K30 Ultra	cezanne	M2006J10C	August 2020	AMOLED, 120 Hz Corning Gorilla Glass 5	6.67"	1080 x 2400 px (Full HD+, ~395 ppi)	Yes	MediaTek Dimensity 1000+ 4x 2.6 GHz Cortex-A77 + 4x 2.0 GHz Cortex-A55	Mali-G77 MC9 @850 MHz	6 GB; 8 GB (LPDDR4X)	128 GB; 256 GB; 512 GB (UFS 2.2)	64 MP, f/1.9 + 13 MP, f/2.4 (ultrawide) + 5 MP, f/2.2 (telephoto macro) + 2 MP, f/2.4 (depth)	20 MP (Pop-Up)	4500 mAh (Li-Po)	Android 10 (MIUI 12)	Android 12 (MIUI 14)	Moonlight White, Midnight Black, Mint Green
Redmi K30S Ultra Global: Xiaomi Mi 10T	apollo	M2007J3SC	November 2020	IPS LCD, 144 Hz Corning Gorilla Glass 5	6.67"	1080 x 2400 px (Full HD+, ~395 ppi)	Yes	Qualcomm Snapdragon 865 1x 2.84 GHz + 3x 2.42 GHz + 4x 1.80 GHz	Adreno 650 @587 MHz	8 GB (LPDDR5)	128 GB; 256 GB (UFS 3.1)	64 MP, f/1.9 + 13 MP, f/2.4 (ultrawide) + 5 MP, f/2.4 (macro)	20 MP, f/2.2	5000 mAh (Li-Po)	Android 10 (MIUI 12)	Android 12 (MIUI 14)	Cosmic Black, Lunar Silver
Redmi K40 Global: POCO F3; India: Mi 11X	alioth	M2012K11AC	February 2021	Super AMOLED, 120 Hz Corning Gorilla Glass 5	6.67"	1080 x 2400 px (Full HD+, ~395 ppi)	Yes	Qualcomm Snapdragon 870 1x 3.2 GHz + 3x 2.42 GHz + 4x 1.80 GHz	Adreno 650 @670 MHz	6 GB; 8 GB; 12 GB (LPDDR5)	128 GB; 256 GB (UFS 3.1)	48 MP, f/1.8 + 8 MP, f/2.2 (ultrawide) + 5 MP, f/2.4 (macro)	20 MP, f/2.5	4520 mAh (Li-Po)	Android 11 (MIUI 12)	Android 13 (HyperOS)	Bright Black, Dreamland, Sunny Snow
Redmi K40 Pro	haydn	M2012K11C	February 2021	Super AMOLED, 120 Hz Corning Gorilla Glass 5	6.67"	1080 x 2400 px (Full HD+, ~395 ppi)	Yes	Qualcomm Snapdragon 888 1x 2.84 GHz Cortex-X1 + 3x 2.42 GHz Cortex-A78 + 4x 1.80 GHz Cortex-A55	Adreno 660 @905 MHz	6 GB; 8 GB (LPDDR5)	128 GB; 256 GB (UFS 3.1)	64 MP, f/1.9 + 8 MP, f/2.2 (ultrawide) + 5 MP, f/2.4 (macro)	20 MP, f/2.5	4520 mAh (Li-Po)	Android 11 (MIUI 12)	Android 14 (HyperOS)	Ink Feather, Dreamland, Sunny Snow
Redmi K40 Pro+ Global: Mi 11i India: Mi 11X Pro	haydn haydnpro	M2012K11C	February 2021	Super AMOLED, 120 Hz Corning Gorilla Glass 5	6.67"	1080 x 2400 px (Full HD+, ~395 ppi)	Yes	Qualcomm Snapdragon 888 1x 2.84 GHz Cortex-X1 + 3x 2.42 GHz Cortex-A78 + 4x 1.80 GHz Cortex-A55	Adreno 660 @905 MHz	12 GB (LPDDR5)	256 GB (UFS 3.1)	108 MP, f/1.8 + 8 MP, f/2.2 (ultrawide) + 5 MP, f/2.4 (macro)	20 MP, f/2.5	4520 mAh (Li-Po)	Android 11 (MIUI 12)	Android 14 (HyperOS)	Ink Feather, Dreamland, Sunny Snow
Redmi K40 Gaming India: POCO F3 GT	ares	M2104K10C	April 2021	OLED, 120 Hz Corning Gorilla Glass 5	6.67"	1080 x 2400 px (Full HD+, ~395 ppi)	Yes	MediaTek Dimensity 1200 1x 3.0 GHz Cortex-A78 + 3x 2.6 GHz Cortex-A78 + 4x 2.0 GHz Cortex-A55	Mali-G77 MC9 @850 MHz	6 GB; 8 GB; 12 GB (LPDDR4X)	128 GB; 256 GB (UFS 3.1)	64 MP, f/1.65 8 MP, f/2.2 (ultrawide) + 2 MP, f/2.4 (macro)	16 MP	5065 mAh (Li-Po)	Android 11 (MIUI 12.5)	Android 13 (HyperOS)	Cosmic Black, Celestial Silver, Lunar White
Redmi K40S	munch	22021211RC	March 2022	AMOLED, 120 Hz Corning Gorilla Glass 5	6.67"	1080 x 2400 px (Full HD+, ~395 ppi)	Yes	Qualcomm Snapdragon 870 1x 3.2 GHz + 3x 2.42 GHz + 4x 1.80 GHz	Adreno 650 @670 MHz	6 GB; 8 GB; 12 GB (LPDDR5)	128 GB; 256 GB (UFS 3.1)	48 MP, f/1.8 8 MP, f/2.2 (ultrawide) + 2 MP, f/2.4 (macro)	20 MP	4500 mAh (Li-Po)	Android 12 (MIUI 13)	Android 14 (HyperOS)	Black, Gray, Blue, Green
Redmi K50G Global: POCO F4 GT	ingres	21121210C	February 2022	OLED, 120 Hz Corning Gorilla Glass Victus	6.67"	1080 x 2400 px (Full HD+, ~395 ppi)	Yes	Qualcomm Snapdragon 8 Gen 1 1x 3.0 GHz Cortex-X2 + 3x 2.5 GHz Cortex-A710 + 4x 1.8 GHz Cortex-A510	Adreno 730 @818 MHz	8 GB; 12 GB (LPDDR5)	128 GB; 256 GB (UFS 3.1)	64 MP, f/1.7 8 MP, f/2.2 (ultrawide) + 2 MP, f/2.4 (macro)	20 MP, f/2.5	4700 mAh (Li-Po)	Android 12 (MIUI 13)	Android 14 (HyperOS 2)	Black, Gray, Blue, AMG
Redmi K50	rubens	22041211AC	March 2022	OLED, 120 Hz Corning Gorilla Glass Victus	6.67"	1440 x 3200 px (Quad HD+, ~526 ppi)	Yes	MediaTek Dimensity 8100 4x 2.5 GHz Cortex-A78 + 4x 2.0 GHz Cortex-A55	Mali-G610 MC6	8 GB; 12 GB (LPDDR5)	128 GB; 256 GB (UFS 3.1)	48 MP, f/1.8 8 MP, f/2.2 (ultrawide) + 2 MP, f/2.4 (macro)	20 MP, f/2.5	5500 mAh (Li-Po)	Android 12 (MIUI 13)	Android 14 (HyperOS 2)	Black, Gray, Blue, Green
Redmi K50 Pro	matisse	22011211C; 22021211RC	March 2022	OLED, 120 Hz Corning Gorilla Glass Victus	6.67"	1440 x 3200 px (Quad HD+, ~526 ppi)	Yes	MediaTek Dimensity 9000 1x 3.05 GHz Cortex-X2 + 3x 2.85 GHz Cortex-A710 + 4x 1.8 GHz Cortex-A510	Mali-G710 MC10 @850 MHz	8 GB; 12 GB (LPDDR5)	128 GB; 256 GB; 512 GB (UFS 3.1)	108 MP, f/1.9 8 MP, f/2.2 (ultrawide) + 2 MP, f/2.4 (macro)	20 MP, f/2.5	5000 mAh (Li-Po)	Android 12 (MIUI 13)	Android 14 (HyperOS 2)	Black, Gray, Blue, Green
Redmi K50i China: Redmi Note 11T Pro Global: POCO X4 GT	xagain	22041216I	July 2022	FFS LCD, 144 Hz Corning Gorilla Glass 5	6.6"	1080 x 2460 px (Full HD+, ~407 ppi)	Yes	MediaTek Dimensity 8100 4x 2.5 GHz Cortex-A78 + 4x 2.0 GHz Cortex-A55	Mali-G610 MC6	6 GB; 8 GB (LPDDR5)	128 GB; 256 GB (UFS 3.1)	64 MP, f/1.9 + 8 MP, f/2.2 (ultrawide) + 2 MP, f/2.4 (macro)	16 MP, f/2.5	5080 mAh (Li-Po)	Android 12 (MIUI 13)	Android 14 (HyperOS 2)	Phantom Blue, Stealth Black, Quick Silver
Redmi K50 Ultra	diting	22081212C	August 2022	OLED, 120 Hz Corning Gorilla Glass 5	6.67"	1220 x 2712 px (~446 ppi)	Yes	Qualcomm Snapdragon 8+ Gen 1 1x 3.2 GHz Cortex-X2 + 3x 2.75 GHz Cortex-A710 + 4x 2.0 GHz Cortex-A510	Adreno 730 @900 MHz	8 GB; 12 GB (LPDDR5)	128 GB; 256 GB; 512 GB (UFS 3.1)	108 MP, f/1.65 + 8 MP, f/2.2 (ultrawide) + 2 MP, f/2.4 (macro)	20 MP, f/2.5	5000 mAh (Li-Po)	Android 12 (MIUI 13)	Android 15 (HyperOS 3)	Black, Gray, Blue, Mercedes AMG
Redmi K60E	rembrandt	22122RK93C	December 2022	OLED, 120 Hz Corning Gorilla Glass Victus	6.67"	1440 x 3200 px (Quad HD+, ~526 ppi)	Yes	MediaTek Dimensity 8200 4x 3.1 GHz Cortex-A78 + 4x 2.0 GHz Cortex-A55	Mali-G610 MC6	8 GB; 12 GB (LPDDR5)	128 GB; 256 GB; 512 GB (UFS 3.1)	48 MP, f/1.8 + 8 MP, f/2.2 (ultrawide) + 2 MP, f/2.4 (macro)	20 MP, f/2.5	5500 mAh (Li-Po)	Android 12 (MIUI 13)	Android 14 (HyperOS 2)	Ink Feather, Quiet Mango, Clear Snow
Redmi K60 Global: POCO F5 Pro	mondrian	23013RK75C	December 2022	OLED, 120 Hz Corning Gorilla Glass 5	6.67"	1440 x 3200 px (Quad HD+, ~526 ppi)	Yes	Qualcomm Snapdragon 8+ Gen 1 1x 3.0 GHz Cortex-X2 + 3x 2.5 GHz Cortex-A710 + 4x 1.8 GHz Cortex-A510	Adreno 730 @900 MHz	8 GB; 12 GB 16 GB (LPDDR5)	128 GB; 256 GB; 512 GB (UFS 3.1)	64 MP, f/1.8 + 8 MP, f/2.2 (ultrawide) + 2 MP, f/2.4 (macro)	16 MP, f/2.5	5500 mAh (Li-Po)	Android 13 (MIUI 14)	Android 15 (HyperOS 3)	Plain Blue, Quiet Mango, Clear Snow, Ink Feather
Redmi K60 Pro	socrates	22127RK46C	December 2022	OLED, 120 Hz Corning Gorilla Glass 5	6.67"	1440 x 3200 px (Quad HD+, ~526 ppi)	Yes	Qualcomm Snapdragon 8 Gen 2 1x 3.2 GHz Cortex-X3 + 2x 2.8 GHz Cortex-A715 + 2x 2.8 GHz Cortex-A710 + 3x 2.0 GHz Cortex-A510	Adreno 740 @980 MHz	8 GB; 12 GB 16 GB (LPDDR5)	128 GB; 256 GB; 512 GB (UFS 3.1)	54 MP, f/1.9 + 8 MP, f/2.2 (ultrawide) + 2 MP, f/2.4 (macro)	16 MP, f/2.5	5000 mAh (Li-Po)	Android 13 (MIUI 14)	Android 15 (HyperOS 3)	Quiet Mango, Clear Snow, Ink Feather, Champion Edition
Redmi K60 Ultra	corot	23078RKD5C	August 2023	OLED, 144 Hz Corning Gorilla Glass 5	6.67"	1220 x 2712 px (~446 ppi)	Yes	MediaTek Dimensity 9200+ 1x 3.35 GHz Cortex-X3 + 3x 3.3 GHz Cortex-A715 + 4x 2.0 GHz Cortex-A510	Immortalis-G715 MC11	12 GB; 16 GB 24 GB (LPDDR5)	256 GB; 512 GB; 1 TB (UFS 4.0)	50 MP, f/1.7 + 8 MP, f/2.2 (ultrawide) + 2 MP, f/2.4 (macro)	20 MP	5000 mAh (Li-Po)	Android 13 (MIUI 14)	Android 16 (HyperOS 3)	
Redmi K70E Global: POCO X6 Pro	duchamp	2311DRK48C	November 2023	OLED, 120 Hz Corning Gorilla Glass 5	6.67"	1220 x 2712 px (~446 ppi)	Yes	MediaTek Dimensity 8300 Ultra 1x 3.35 GHz Cortex-A715 + 3x 3.2 GHz Cortex-A715 + 4x 2.2 GHz Cortex-A510	Mali-G615 MP6	12 GB; 16 GB (LPDDR5X)	256 GB; 512 GB; 1 TB (UFS 4.0)	64 MP, f/1.8 + 8 MP, f/2.2 (ultrawide) + 2 MP, f/2.4 (macro)	16 MP, f/2.4	5500 mAh (Li-Po)	Android 14 (HyperOS)	Android 16 (HyperOS 3)	Shadow Green, Ink Feather, Clear Snow
Redmi K70 Global: POCO F6 Pro	vermeer	23113RKC6C	November 2023	OLED, 120 Hz Corning Gorilla Glass 5	6.67"	1440 x 3200 px (Quad HD+, ~526 ppi)	Yes	Qualcomm Snapdragon 8 Gen 2 1x 3.2 GHz Cortex-X3 + 2x 2.8 GHz Cortex-A715 + 2x 2.8 GHz Cortex-A710 + 3x 2.0 GHz Cortex-A510	Adreno 740 @980 MHz	12 GB; 16 GB (LPDDR5X)	256 GB; 512 GB; 1 TB (UFS 4.0)	50 MP, f/1.6 + 8 MP, f/2.2 (ultrawide) + 2 MP, f/2.4 (macro)	16 MP	5000 mAh (Li-Po)	Android 14 (HyperOS)	Android 16 (HyperOS 3)	Ink Feather, Clear Snow, Bamboo Moonlight, Light Eggplant Purple
Redmi K70 Pro	manet	23117RK66C	November 2023	OLED, 120 Hz Corning Gorilla Glass 5	6.67"	1440 x 3200 px (Quad HD+, ~526 ppi)	Yes	Qualcomm Snapdragon 8 Gen 3 1x 3.3 GHz Cortex-X4 + 5x 3.2 GHz Cortex-A720 + 2x 2.8 GHz Cortex-A710 + 2x 2.3 GHz Cortex-A520	Adreno 750	12 GB; 16 GB 24 GB (LPDDR5X)	256 GB; 512 GB; 1 TB (UFS 4.0)	50 MP, f/1.6 + 50 MP (telephoto) + 12 MP (ultrawide)	16 MP	5000 mAh (Li-Po)	Android 14 (HyperOS)	Android 16 (HyperOS 3)	Ink Feather, Clear Snow, Bamboo Moonlight, Green (Automobili Lamborghini SQUADRA CORSE), Yellow (Automobili Lamborghini SQUADRA CORSE)
Redmi K70 Ultra	rothko	2407FRK8EC	July 2024	OLED, 144 Hz	6.67"	1220 x 2712 px (~446 ppi)	Yes	MediaTek Dimensity 9300+ 1x 3.25 GHz Cortex-X4 + 3x 2.85 GHz Cortex-X4 + 4x 2.0 GHz Cortex-A720	Immortalis-G720 MC12	12 GB; 16 GB 24 GB (LPDDR5X)	256 GB; 512 GB; 1 TB (UFS 4.0)	50 MP, f/1.7 + 8 MP, f/2.2 (ultrawide) + 2 MP, f/2.4 (macro)	20 MP	5500 mAh (Li-Po)	Android 14 (HyperOS)	Android 16 (HyperOS 3)	Ink Feather, Clear Snow, Ceramic Glaze, Orange (Supreme Champion Edition), Green (Supreme Champion Edition)
Redmi K80 Global: POCO F7 Pro	zorn	24117RK2CC	November 2024	OLED, 120 Hz Corning Gorilla Glass 7i	6.67"	1440 x 3200 px (Quad HD+, ~526 ppi)	Yes	Qualcomm Snapdragon 8 Gen 3 1x 3.3 GHz Cortex-X4 + 5x 3.2 GHz Cortex-A720 + 2x 2.8 GHz Cortex-A710 + 2x 2.3 GHz Cortex-A520	Adreno 750	12 GB; 16 GB (LPDDR5X)	256 GB; 512 GB; 1 TB (UFS 4.0)	50 MP, f/1.6 + 8 MP, f/2.2 (ultrawide)	20 MP	6550 mAh (Si/C Li-Ion)	Android 15 (HyperOS 2)	Android 16 (HyperOS 3)	Snowy White, Midnight Black, Mountain Green, Tide Moon Blue.
Redmi K80 Pro Global: POCO F7 Ultra	miro	24122RKC7C 24127RK2CC (Automobili Lamborghini SQUADRA CORSE)	November 2024	OLED, 120 Hz Xiaomi Shield Glass 2.0	6.67"	1440 x 3200 px (Quad HD+, ~526 ppi)	Yes	Qualcomm Snapdragon 8 Elite 2x 4.32 GHz Oryon V2 Phoenix L + 6x 3.53 GHz Oryon V2 Phoenix M	Adreno 830 @1100 MHz	12 GB; 16 GB (LPDDR5X)	256 GB; 512 GB; 1 TB (UFS 4.0)	50 MP, f/1.6 + 50 MP, f/2.0 (telephoto) + 32 MP, f/2.2 (ultrawide)	20 MP	6000 mAh (Si/C Li-Ion)	Android 15 (HyperOS 2)	Android 16 (HyperOS 3)	Midnight Black, Snowy White, Mountain Green, Light Eggplant Purple, Green (Automobili Lamborghini SQUADRA CORSE), Dark Gray (Automobili Lamborghini SQUADRA CORSE)
Redmi K80 Ultra	dali		June 2025	OLED, 144 Hz Xiaomi Shield Glass	6.83"	1280 x 2772 px (~447 ppi)	Yes	MediaTek Dimensity 9400+ 1x 3.73 GHz Cortex-X925 + 3x 3.3 GHz Cortex-X4 + 4x 2.4 GHz Cortex-A720	Immortalis-G925 MC12	12 GB; 16 GB (LPDDR5X)	256 GB; 512 GB; 1 TB (UFS 4.1)	50 MP, f/1.6 + 8 MP, f/2.2 (ultrawide)	20 MP	7410 mAh (Si/C Li-Ion)	Android 15 (HyperOS 2)	Android 16 (HyperOS 3)	Shale Gray, Lunar White, Spruce Green, Ice Blade Blue.
Redmi K90 Global: POCO F8 Pro			October 2025	AMOLED, 120 Hz Corning Gorilla Glass 7i	6.59"	1156 x 2510 px (~419 ppi)	Yes	Qualcomm Snapdragon 8 Elite 2x 4.32 GHz Oryon V2 Phoenix L + 6x 3.53 GHz Oryon V2 Phoenix M	Adreno 830 @1100 MHz	12 GB; 16 GB (LPDDR5X)	256 GB; 512 GB; 1 TB (UFS 4.1)	50 MP, f/1.9 + 50 MP, f/2.2 (telephoto) + 8 MP, f/2.2 (ultrawide)	20 MP	7100 mAh (Si/C Li-Ion)	Android 16 (HyperOS 3)	Android 17 (HyperOS 4)	
Redmi K90 Pro Max Global: POCO F8 Ultra			October 2025	AMOLED, 120 Hz Xiaomi Dragon Crystal Glass	6.9"	1200 x 2608 px (~416 ppi)	Yes	Qualcomm Snapdragon 8 Elite Gen 5 2x 4.6 GHz Oryon V3 Phoenix L + 6x 3.62 GHz Oryon V3 Phoenix M	Adreno 840	12 GB; 16 GB (LPDDR5X)	256 GB; 512 GB; 1 TB (UFS 4.1)	50 MP, f/1.7 + 50 MP, f/3.0 (periscope telephoto) + 50 MP, f/2.4 (ultrawide)	32 MP, f/2.2	7560 mAh (Si/C Li-Ion)	Android 16 (HyperOS 3)	Android 17 (HyperOS 4)	
Model	Codename	Model number	Release date	Display type	Display size	Display resolution	5G support	SoC	GPU	RAM	Internal storage	Rear	Front	Battery	Initial	Current	Colours
Model	Codename	Model number	Release date	Display type	Display size	Display resolution	5G support	SoC	GPU	RAM	Internal storage	Camera		Battery	Operating System		Colours

=== Redmi A Series ===
Model	Codename	Model number	Release date	Display type	Display size	Display resolution	5G support	SoC	GPU	RAM	Internal storage	Camera		Battery	Operating System		Colours
Model	Codename	Model number	Release date	Display type	Display size	Display resolution	5G support	SoC	GPU	RAM	Internal storage	Rear	Front	Battery	Initial	Current	Colours
Redmi A1	ice	220733SG 220733SI 220733SL	September 2022	IPS LCD	6.52"	720 x 1600 (HD+, ~269 ppi)	No	Mediatek Helio A22 4x 2.0 GHz Cortex-A53	PowerVR GE8300 @660 MHz	2 GB; 3 GB (LPDDR4X)	32 GB (eMMC 5.1)	8 MP, f/2.0 + 0.08 MP	5 MP, f/2.2	5000 mAh (Li-Po)	Android 12 Android Go		Light Green, Light Blue, Black
Redmi A1+India: POCO C50	snow	220733SFG	September 2022	IPS LCD	6.52"	720 x 1600 (HD+, ~269 ppi)	No	Mediatek Helio A22 4x 2.0 GHz Cortex-A53	PowerVR GE8300 @660 MHz	2 GB; 3 GB (LPDDR4X)	32 GB (eMMC 5.1)	8 MP, f/2.0 + 0.08 MP	5 MP, f/2.2	5000 mAh (Li-Po)	Android 12 Android Go		Light Green, Light Blue, Black
Redmi A2	cloud	23026RN54G	March 2023	IPS LCD	6.52"	720 x 1600 (HD+, ~269 ppi)	No	MediaTek Helio G36 4x 2.2 GHz Cortex-A53 + 4x 1.7 GHz Cortex-A53	PowerVR GE8320 @680 MHz	2 GB; 3 GB (LPDDR4X)	32 GB (eMMC 5.1)	8 MP, f/2.0 + 0.08 MP	5 MP, f/2.2	5000 mAh (Li-Po)	Android 13 Android Go		Light Green, Light Blue, Black
Redmi A2+ POCO C51	water	22026RN4DG 22026RN4DH 22026RN4DI	March 2023	IPS LCD	6.52"	720 x 1600 (HD+, ~269 ppi)	No	MediaTek Helio G36 4x 2.2 GHz Cortex-A53 + 4x 1.7 GHz Cortex-A53	PowerVR GE8320 @680 MHz	2 GB; 3 GB (LPDDR4X)	32 GB (eMMC 5.1)	8 MP, f/2.0 + 0.08 MP	5 MP, f/2.2	5000 mAh (Li-Po)	Android 13 Android Go		Light Green, Light Blue, Black
Redmi A3 POCO C61	blue	23129RN51H 23129RN51X 2312CRNCCL	February 2024	IPS LCD, 90 Hz Corning Gorilla Glass 3	6.71"	720 x 1650 (HD+, ~268 ppi)	No	MediaTek Helio G36 4x 2.2 GHz Cortex-A53 + 4x 1.7 GHz Cortex-A53	PowerVR GE8320 @680 MHz	3 GB; 4 GB; 6 GB (LPDDR4X)	64 GB 128 GB (eMMC 5.1)	8 MP, f/2.0 + 0.08 MP	5 MP, f/2.2	5000 mAh (Li-Po)	Android 14	Android 16	Midnight Black, Forest/Olive Green, Star/Lake Blue
Redmi A3x	klein	24048RN6CG 24048RN6CI	May 2024	IPS LCD, 90 Hz Corning Gorilla Glass 3	6.71"	720 x 1650 (HD+, ~268 ppi)	No	UNISOC T603 2x 1.8 GHz + 6x 1.6 GHz		3 GB (LPDDR4X)	64 GB (eMMC 5.1)	8 MP, f/2.0 + 0.08 MP	5 MP, f/2.2	5000 mAh (Li-Po)	Android 14	Android 16	Midnight Black, Moonlight White, Aurora Green
Redmi A3 Pro Redmi 14C, POCO C75	lake pond	2409BRN2CG	October 2024	IPS LCD, 90 Hz	6.88"	720 x 1640 (HD+, ~260 ppi)	No	MediaTek Helio G81 Ultra 2x 2.0 GHz Cortex-A75 + 6x 1.8 GHz Cortex-A55	Mali-G52 MC2	4 GB (LPDDR4X)	128 GB (eMMC 5.1)	50 MP, f/1.8 + 0.08 MP	13 MP, f/2.0	5160 mAh (Li-Po)	Android 14 (HyperOS)	Android 16 (HyperOS 3)	Black, Blue
Redmi A4 5G POCO C75 5G	warm	24116RNC1I	November 2024	IPS LCD, 120 Hz	6.88"	720 x 1640 (HD+, ~260 ppi)	Yes	Qualcomm Snapdragon 4s Gen 2 2x 2.0 GHz Cortex-A78 + 6x 1.8 GHz Cortex-A55	Adreno 611	4 GB (LPDDR4X)	64 GB 128 GB (UFS 2.2)	50 MP, f/1.8 + 0.08 MP	5 MP, f/2.2	5160 mAh (Li-Po)	Android 14 (HyperOS)	Android 16 (HyperOS 3.1)	Sparkle Purple, Starry Black
Redmi A5 POCO C71	serenity	25028RN03A 25028RN03G 25028RN03I 25028RN03L 25028RN03Y	March 2025	IPS LCD, 120 Hz	6.88"	720 x 1640 (HD+, ~260 ppi)	No	UNISOC T7250 2x 1.8 GHz Cortex-A75 + 6x 1.6 GHz Cortex-A55	Mali-G57 MP1	4 GB; 6 GB (LPDDR4X)	64 GB 128 GB (eMMC 5.1)	32 MP, f/1.8 + 0.08 MP	8 MP, f/2.0	5200 mAh (Li-Po)	Android 15 Android Go		Midnight Black, Sandy Gold, Lake Green, Blue
Model	Codename	Model number	Release date	Display type	Display size	Display resolution	5G support	SoC	GPU	RAM	Internal storage	Rear	Front	Battery	Initial	Current	Colours
Model	Codename	Model number	Release date	Display type	Display size	Display resolution	5G support	SoC	GPU	RAM	Internal storage	Camera		Battery	Operating System		Colours

== Tablets ==
Model	Codename	Model number	Release date	Display type	Display size	Display resolution	LTE support	5G support	SoC	GPU	RAM	Internal storage	Camera		Battery	Operating system		Colors
Model	Codename	Model number	Release date	Display type	Display size	Display resolution	LTE support	5G support	SoC	GPU	RAM	Internal storage	Rear	Front	Battery	Initial	Current	Colors
Redmi Pad	yunluo	22081283C (China)22081283G (Global)	October 2022	IPS LCD, 90 Hz	10.61"	1200 x 2000 px (~220 ppi)	N/A	N/A	MediaTek Helio G99 2x 2.2 GHz Cortex-A76 + 6x 2.0 GHz Cortex-A55	Mali-G57 MC2	3 GB; 4 GB; 6 GB (LPDDR4X)	64 GB; 128 GB (UFS 2.2)	8 MP, f/2.0	8 MP, f/2.3	8000 mAh (Li-Po)	Android 12 (MIUI Pad 13)	Android 14 (HyperOS)	Graphite Gray, Moonlight Silver, Mint Green
Redmi Pad SE	xun	23073RPBFC (China)23073RPBFG (Global) 23073RPBFL (Latin America)	September 2023	IPS LCD, 90 Hz	11.0"	1200 x 1920 px (~207 ppi)	N/A	N/A	Qualcomm Snapdragon 680 4x 2.4 GHz Cortex-A73 + 4x 1.9 GHz Cortex-A55	Adreno 610	4 GB; 6 GB; 8 GB (LPDDR4X)	128 GB 256 GB (eMMC 5.1)	8 MP, f/2.0	5 MP, f/2.2	8000 mAh (Li-Po)	Android 13 (MIUI Pad 14)	Android 15 (HyperOS 2)	Graphite Gray, Mint Green, Lavender Purpl
Redmi Pad Pro POCO Pad	dizi	2405CRPFDC (China)2405CRPFDG (Global) 2405CRPFDI (India) 2405CRPFDL (Latin America)	April 2024	IPS LCD, 120 Hz Corning Gorilla Glass 3	12.1"	1600 x 2560 px (~249 ppi)	N/A	N/A	Qualcomm Snapdragon 7s Gen 2 4x 2.4 GHz Cortex-A78 + 4x 1.95 GHz Cortex-A55	Adreno 710	6 GB; 8 GB (LPDDR4X)	128 GB; 256 GB (UFS 2.2)	8 MP, f/2.0	8 MP, f/2.3	10000 mAh (Li-Po)	Android 14 (HyperOS)	Android 15 (HyperOS 2)	Graphite Gray, Mint Green, Ocean / Mist Blue
Redmi Pad Pro 5G POCO Pad 5G	ruan	24074RPD2C (China)24074RPD2G (Global)	May 2024	IPS LCD, 120 Hz Corning Gorilla Glass 3	12.1"	1600 x 2560 px (~249 ppi)	Yes	Yes	Qualcomm Snapdragon 7s Gen 2 4x 2.4 GHz Cortex-A78 + 4x 1.95 GHz Cortex-A55	Adreno 710	6 GB; 8 GB (LPDDR4X)	128 GB; 256 GB (UFS 2.2)	8 MP, f/2.0	8 MP, f/2.3	10000 mAh (Li-Po)	Android 14 (HyperOS)	Android 15 (HyperOS 2)	Graphite Gray, Mint Green, Quick Silver
Redmi Pad SE 4G Global: Redmi Pad SE 8.7 4G	spark	24076RP19I	July 2024	IPS LCD, 90 Hz Corning Gorilla Glass 3	8.7"	800 x 1340 px (~179 ppi)	Yes	No	MediaTek Helio G85 2x 2.0 GHz Cortex-A75 + 6x 1.8 GHz Cortex-A55	Mali-G52 MC2 @1 GHz	4 GB (LPDDR4X)	64 GB 128 GB (eMMC 5.1)	8 MP, f/2.0	5 MP, f/2.2	6650 mAh (Li-Po)	Android 14 (HyperOS)	Android 15 (HyperOS 2)	Forest Green, Ocean Blue, Urban Grey
Redmi Pad SE 8.7 4G India: Redmi Pad SE 4G	spark	24076RP19G	August 2024	IPS LCD, 90 Hz Corning Gorilla Glass 3	8.7"	800 x 1340 px (~179 ppi)	Yes	No	MediaTek Helio G85 2x 2.0 GHz Cortex-A75 + 6x 1.8 GHz Cortex-A55	Mali-G52 MC2 @1 GHz	4 GB; 6 GB (LPDDR4X)	64 GB 128 GB (eMMC 5.1)	8 MP, f/2.0	5 MP, f/2.2	6650 mAh (Li-Po)	Android 14 (HyperOS)	Android 15 (HyperOS 2)	Aurora Green, Sky Blue, Graphite Gray
Redmi Pad SE 8.7	flare	24075RP89G	August 2024	IPS LCD, 90 Hz Corning Gorilla Glass 3	8.7"	800 x 1340 px (~179 ppi)	N/A	N/A	MediaTek Helio G85 2x 2.0 GHz Cortex-A75 + 6x 1.8 GHz Cortex-A55	Mali-G52 MC2 @1 GHz	4 GB; 6 GB (LPDDR4X)	64 GB 128 GB (eMMC 5.1)	8 MP, f/2.0	5 MP, f/2.2	6650 mAh (Li-Po)	Android 14 (HyperOS)	Android 15 (HyperOS 2)	Aurora Green, Sky Blue, Graphite Gray
Redmi Pad 2	taiko	25040RP0AC (China) 25040RP0AE (Europe) 25040RP0AG (Global) 25040RP0AI (India) 25040RP0AL (Latin America)	July 2025	IPS LCD, 90 Hz	11.0"	1600 x 2560 px (~274 ppi)	N/A	N/A	MediaTek Helio G100 Ultra 2x 2.2 GHz Cortex-A76 + 6x 2.0 GHz Cortex-A55	Mali-G57 MC2	4 GB; 6 GB; 8 GB (LPDDR4X)	128 GB; 256 GB (UFS 2.2)	8 MP, f/2.0	5 MP, f/2.2	9000 mAh (Li-Po)	Android 15 (HyperOS 2)		Graphite Gray, Mint Green, Lavender Purple, Sky Blue
Redmi Pad 2 4G	koto	2505DRP06C (China) 2505DRP06E (Europe) 2505DRP06G (Global) 2505DRP06I (India)	July 2025	IPS LCD, 90 Hz	11.0"	1600 x 2560 px (~274 ppi)	Yes	No	MediaTek Helio G100 Ultra 2x 2.2 GHz Cortex-A76 + 6x 2.0 GHz Cortex-A55	Mali-G57 MC2	4 GB; 6 GB; 8 GB (LPDDR4X)	128 GB; 256 GB (UFS 2.2)	8 MP, f/2.0	5 MP, f/2.2	9000 mAh (Li-Po)	Android 15 (HyperOS 2)		Graphite Gray, Mint Green, Lavender Purple, Sky Blue
Redmi Pad 2 Play Bundle	taiko	25040RP0AG	September 2025	IPS LCD, 90 Hz	11.0"	1600 x 2560 px (~274 ppi)	N/A	N/A	MediaTek Helio G100 Ultra 2x 2.2 GHz Cortex-A76 + 6x 2.0 GHz Cortex-A55	Mali-G57 MC2	4 GB (LPDDR4X)	128 GB (UFS 2.2)	8 MP, f/2.0	5 MP, f/2.2	9000 mAh (Li-Po)	Android 15 (HyperOS 2)		Graphite Gray
Redmi Pad 2 Pro POCO Pad M1	flute	25099RP13C (China)25099RP13G (Global) 25099RP13I (India)	September 2025	IPS LCD, 120 Hz	12.1"	1600 x 2560 px (~249 ppi)	N/A	N/A	Qualcomm Snapdragon 7s Gen 3 1x 2.7 GHz Cortex-A720 + 3x 2.4 GHz Cortex-A720 + 4x 1.8 GHz Cortex-A520	Adreno 810	6 GB; 8 GB (LPDDR4X)	128 GB; 256 GB (UFS 2.2)	8 MP, f/2.0	8 MP, f/2.3	12000 mAh (Li-Po)	Android 15 (HyperOS 2)		Graphite Gray, Silver, Lavender Purple
Redmi Pad 2 Pro 5G	organ	2509BRP2DC (China)2509BRP2DG (Global) 2509BRP2DI (India)	September 2025	IPS LCD, 120 Hz	12.1"	1600 x 2560 px (~249 ppi)	Yes	Yes	Qualcomm Snapdragon 7s Gen 3 1x 2.7 GHz Cortex-A720 + 3x 2.4 GHz Cortex-A720 + 4x 1.8 GHz Cortex-A520	Adreno 810	6 GB; 8 GB (LPDDR4X)	128 GB; 256 GB (UFS 2.2)	13 MP, f/2.2	8 MP, f/2.3	12000 mAh (Li-Po)	Android 15 (HyperOS 2)		Graphite Gray, Silver, Lavender Purple
Model	Codename	Model number	Release date	Display type	Display size	Display resolution	LTE support	5G support	SoC	GPU	RAM	Internal storage	Rear	Front	Battery	Initial	Current	Colours
Model	Codename	Model number	Release date	Display type	Display size	Display resolution	LTE support	5G support	SoC	GPU	RAM	Internal storage	Camera		Battery	Operating system		Colours

== Redmi TV ==
The first TV that Xiaomi introduced under the Redmi brand was the Redmi Smart TV 70-inch that debuted in China.

The Beijing-based company later expanded its Redmi TV portfolio by bringing the Redmi Smart TV X50, Redmi Smart TV X55, and the Redmi Smart TV X65 in May 2020. The catalogue further expanded with the Redmi Smart TV A series and Redmi Smart TV A65.

As of October 2023, the screen size of Redmi TV ranges from 32" to 100", with price ranging from RMB 899 to RMB 19999.

=== Redmi TV 70" ===
The Redmi TV was launched with 4K HDR display, quad core processor and PatchWall interface. It had Dolby Audio and DTS-HD audio technologies. It went on sale in China for CNY 3,799.

=== Redmi TV MAX 98 ===
Coming to the features, the Redmi Smart TV Max 98-inch features a 4K display with 85 percent NTSC, wide colour gamut and 192 dynamic backlight zones. The Redmi Smart TV Max 98-inch is powered by a customised 12 nm chip, and it features MEMC motion compensation for smoother animation. The television packs 4 GB of RAM, and offers 64 GB of storage.

=== Redmi TV X (50/55/65 inches) ===
The TV has Reality Flow and Vivid Picture Engine as features meant to improve the viewing experience. Various sound formats are also supported, including Dolby Audio for the inbuilt speakers, Dolby Atmos pass-through over eARC, and DTS Virtual:X.

The television runs on Android TV 10, with the stock Android TV launcher and access to Google Assistant. Like other televisions from Xiaomi, it's also possible to access the PatchWall UI on the Redmi TV X Series, that is Xiaomi's content-focused, curated user interface that is popular on its Mi TV range. There is also Google Chromecast built in, and the Redmi TV range is the first from the company to have the Mi Home app for IoT products supported on the TVs.

=== Redmi TV A (32/43/50/55/65 inches) ===
The TV packs 1.5 GB of RAM and come with 8 GB of internal storage. There's also Stereo Speakers that are claimed to offer more immersive sound, along with DTS decoding support.

It is running the MIUI operating system based on Android which can also be used to control smart home devices through voice commands. The company has also introduced a new Minimalist Mode so that elders can easily navigate through the interface.

=== Redmi TV MAX 86 ===
Released in February 2021

=== Redmi TV MAX 100 ===
Released in March 2022

=== Redmi TV MAX 90 ===
Released in April 2023

== Redmi Washing Machine ==
As of May 2020, Redmi has a total of 2 top load washer models.

Redmi Fully-Automatic Top Load Washing Machine 1A 8 kg
Redmi Fully-Automatic Top Load Washing Machine 1S 8 kg

== RedmiBook Laptop ==
RedmiBook 14
RedmiBook 14 Enhanced Edition
RedmiBook 13
RedmiBook 14 II
RedmiBook 16
RedmiBook Air
Redmi G (2020)
RedmiBook Pro (2021)
Redmi G (2021)
Redmi Book Pro (2022)
Redmi G (2022)
Redmi G Pro (2022)
Redmi Book 15E
Redmi Book 14 (2023)
Redmi Book Pro 14 (2024)
Redmi Book 16 (2024)
Redmi Book Pro 16 (2024)
Redmi Book 16 (2025)
Redmi Book Pro 16 (2025)
Redmi Book 14 (2025)
Redmi Book Pro 14 (2025)

== Redmi accessories ==
Redmi accessories ranges from wireless earbuds, power banks, Internet routers to smart AI speakers.

10000mAh Redmi Power Bank
20000mAh Redmi 18W Fast Charge Power Bank
Redmi AC2100 Gigabit Router
Redmi AX5 WiFi 6 Gigabit Router
Redmi AX6 WiFi 6 Gigabit Router
Redmi AX6S WiFi 6 Gigabit Router
Redmi XiaoAI Speaker Play
Redmi AirDots TWS (Mi True Wireless Earbuds Basic)
Redmi AirDots S (Mi True Wireless Earbuds Basic S)
Redmi AirDots 2 (Mi True Wireless Earbuds Basic 2)
Redmi AirDots 3/Earbuds 3 Pro
Redmi AirDots 3 Pro/Buds 3 Pro
Redmi Buds 3
Redmi Buds 3 Lite
Redmi Buds 4
Redmi Buds 4 Pro
Redmi Buds 4 Lite
Redmi Buds 4 Active
Redmi Buds 5
Redmi Buds 5 Pro
Redmi Buds 6
Redmi Buds 6 Pro
Redmi Buds 6 Lite
Redmi Buds 6 Active
Redmi Buds 6 Play
Redmi Buds 7S
Redmi Buds Essential
Redmi Watch (Mi Watch Lite)
Redmi Watch 2 (POCO Watch)
Redmi Watch 2 Lite
Redmi Watch 3
Redmi Watch 3 Lite/Active
Redmi Watch 4
Redmi Watch 5
Redmi Watch 5 Lite
Redmi Watch 5 Active
Redmi Watch Move

=== Smart bands ===
Legend:	Discontinued and unsupported	Discontinued, but still supported	Current

Model	Redmi Smart Band Global: Mi Smart Band 4C	Redmi Smart Band Pro	Redmi Smart Band 2 Also: Xiaomi Smart Band 8 Active	Redmi Smart Band 3 Global: Xiaomi Smart Band 9 Active
Satellite navigation	No			
Water Resistant	5 ATM			
Bluetooth	Bluetooth 5.0 BLE		Bluetooth 5.1 BLE	Bluetooth 5.3 BLE
Optical Heart Sensor	PPG heart rate sensor			
Electrical heart sensor (ECG/EKG)	No			
Blood oxygen sensor	No	Yes		
Accelerometer	3-axis		Yes	
Gyroscope	3-axis		No	
Ambient light sensor	No	Yes	No	
Altimeter	No			
Compass	No			
Display	1.08" TFT; 128*220 resolution 236 PPI 16-bit color depth ≥ 200 nits brightness, adjustable	1.47" AMOLED; 194*368 resolution 282 PPI 8-bit color depth up to 450 nits brightness, adjustable	1.47" TFT; 172*320 resolution 247 PPI; 60 Hz Refresh Rate up to 450 nits brightness, adjustable	
Requires	Android 4.4 or iOS 9.0 and above	Android 6.0 or iOS 10.0 and above	Android 6.0 or iOS 12.0 and above	Android 8.0 or iOS 12.0 and above
Battery	130 mA·h; LiPo Battery; Battery life: ≥ 14 days	200 mA·h; LiIon Battery; Battery life: ≥ 14 days	210 mA·h; LiPo Battery; Battery life: ≥ 14 days	300 mA·h; Battery life: up to 18 days
Charge Times	≤ 2 hours to 100% USB-A	Magnetic charging	< 2 hours to 100% Magnetic fast charging	< 2 hours to 100% Magnetic fast charging
Weight	13.0 g	15 g	14.9 g	16.5 g
Release Date	6 July 2020	30 October 2021	1 February 2023	29 October 2024

== Software ==
=== Update policy ===
The Android and MIUI/Xiaomi HyperOS update support may vary depending on the series model.

==== Smartphones ====
Series	Models	Android	MIUI/Xiaomi HyperOS	Security updates
Redmi	9 (India)/9 Activ, 9C, 9AT/9A Sport/9i/9i Sport, 10A	0 major versions	0 major versions	+2 years
Redmi	3/Prime, 4, 4 Prime	0 major versions	+2 major versions	+2 years
Redmi	2, 2A/2A Enhanced	0 major versions	+3 major versions	+2 years
Redmi	1S 4G	0 major versions	+4 major versions	+2 years
Redmi	9A, 9C NFC	+1 major version	+1 major version	+2 years
Redmi	4A, 5 series, 8A Dual/8A Pro	+1 major version	+2 major versions	+2 years
Redmi	2 Prime, 3S/3S Prime/3X, 4X/4 (India), 6 series, 7 series, 8, 8A	+1 major version	+3 major versions	+2 years
Redmi	Redmi, 1S	+1 major version	+4 major versions	+2 years
Redmi	10C/10 (India)/Power	+2 major versions	+1 major version	+3 years
Redmi	9/Prime, 10/2022/Prime/Prime 2022, 10 5G, 11 Prime series	+2 major versions	+2 major versions	+3 years
Redmi	12 series, 13 series, 14 series, 15, 15 5G	+2 major versions	+2 major versions	+4 years
Redmi	9T/Power	+2 major versions	+3 major versions	+3 years
Redmi	15C, 15C 5G, 15R, 17, 17 5G, 17C 5G	+4 major versions	+4 major versions	+6 years
Redmi Note	Note Prime, Note 3 (MediaTek), Note 4/4X (MediaTek), Note 5A, Note 5A Prime	0 major versions	+2 major versions	+2 years
Redmi Note	Note 2 series	0 major versions	+3 major versions	+2 years
Redmi Note	Note 4G, Note 1S 4G	0 major versions	+4 major versions	+2 years
Redmi Note	Note 3 (Snapdragon)/Pro, Note 3 SE, Note 4/4X (Snapdragon), Note 5 (India), Note 10 Pro (India), Note 10 Pro Max	+1 major version	+2 major versions	+2 years
Redmi Note	Note 5, Note 6 Pro, Note 7 series	+1 major version	+3 major versions	+2 years
Redmi Note	Note 10	+1 major version	+3 major versions	+3 years
Redmi Note	Note (3G)	+1 major version	+4 major versions	+2 years
Redmi Note	Note 5 Pro	+2 major versions	+2 major versions	+2 years
Redmi Note	Note 8 (2021), Note 10S/11 SE, Note 10 Pro 5G, Note 11, Note 11S, Note 11 Pro, Note 11 Pro 5G/11 Pro+ (India)/11E Pro, Note 11E, Note 12, Note 12S	+2 major versions	+2 major versions	+3 years
Redmi Note	Note 12R, Note 13, Note 13R, Note 15R	+2 major versions	+2 major versions	+4 years
Redmi Note	Note 8, 8T, 8 Pro, Note 9, Note 9 4G, Note 9 5G, Note 9T, Note 9 Pro 5G, Note 10 5G/11SE, Note 10 Pro, Note 11 5G/11T, Note 11S 5G, Note 11 Pro (China), Note 11 Pro+, Note 11T Pro series	+2 major versions	+3 major versions	+3 years
Redmi Note	Note 13 5G, Note 14 5G/14 SE 5G/15R Pro	+2 major versions	+3 major versions	+4 years
Redmi Note	Note 9S/9 Pro (India)/10 Lite, Note 9 Pro, Note 9 Pro Max	+2 major versions	+4 major versions	+4 years
Redmi Note	Note 13 Pro series, Note 14 Pro series	+3 major versions	+3 major versions	+4 years
Redmi Note	Note 14, Note 15, Note 15 5G, Note 15 SE 5G, Note 15 Pro series, Note 17 series	+4 major versions	+4 major versions	+6 years
Redmi K	K40S	+2 major versions	+2 major versions	+3 years
Redmi K	K20 series, K30, K30 5G, K30i, K30 5G Racing, K30 Ultra series, K40, K40 Pro series, K40 Gaming, K50, K50 Pro, K50i, K60, K60 Pro, K60E	+2 major versions	+3 major versions	+3 years
Redmi K	K30 Pro series	+2 major versions	+4 major versions	+4 years
Redmi K	K50 Ultra, K70, K70 Pro, K70E	+3 major versions	+4 major versions	+4 years
Redmi K	K60 Ultra, K70 Ultra	+4 major versions	+5 major versions	+5 years
Redmi K	K80 series, K90 series, K100 series	+4 major versions	+5 major versions	+6 years
Redmi Turbo	Turbo 3, Turbo 4	+3 major versions	+4 major versions	+4 years
Redmi Turbo	Turbo 4 Pro, Turbo 5 series	+4 major versions	+5 major versions	+6 years
Redmi A	A1 series, A2 series	0 major versions	-	+2 years
Redmi A	A3, A3x, A5	+1 major version	-	+2 years
Redmi A	A3 Pro, A4 5G	+2 major version	+2 major versions	+4 years
Redmi A	A7 Pro	+4 major versions	+4 major versions	+6 years
Redmi Y series	Y1, Y1 Lite	0 major versions	+2 major versions	+2 years
Redmi Y series	Y2/S2	1 major version	+3 major versions	+2 years
Redmi Y series	Y3	1 major version	+2 major versions	+2 years
Other	Go	0 major versions	-	+2 years
Other	10X series	+2 major version	+2 major version	+3 years

==== Tablets ====
Models	Android	MIUI/Xiaomi HyperOS	Security updates
Pad series, K Pad	+2 major versions	+2 major versions	+3 years
Pad 2 series	+5 major versions	+5 or 6 major versions	+7 years

== See also ==
- List of Realme products
