= ISOCELL =

Mobile camera sensors by Samsung Semiconductor

The ISOCELL CMOS camera sensors are a family of sensors produced by Samsung and available for purchase by other companies. They are used in a wide variety of products including mobile phones, computers and digital cameras.

== Design ==
These sensors use one of the following pixel type technologies:

- FSI: frontside-illuminated. The light that reaches the photosensitive area is reduced because it needs to pass through multiple metal and dielectric layers.
- BSI: backside-illuminated.The metal wiring shifted to backside of photosensitive area(photodiode). The light reaches the photosensitive area directly.
- ISOCELL: ISOCELL combines 3D-BSI with Front-side, Full-depth, Deep-Trench Isolation (F-DTI) and Vertical Transfer Gate (VTG). This provides increased light sensitivity and higher color fidelity even in poor lighting conditions.
- ISOCELL Plus: ISOCELL Plus replaces ISOCELL's metal grid barriers with an innovative new material developed by Fujifilm. This minimizes optical loss and light reflection, providing higher color fidelity and up to a 15% enhancement in light sensitivity compared to ISOCELL.
- ISOCELL 2.0: ISOCELL 2.0 builds on ISOCELL Plus technology by additionally replacing the lower portion of the color filter barriers with a more reflective material. It further reduces optical loss in each pixel and drastically improves light sensitivity producing even more vivid pictures with reduced noise.

These sensors can be configured with one of the following chroma technologies:

- BW also known as Monochrome. No color filter array.
- RGB also known as Bayer filter or RGGB. Features a repeating 2×2 pattern with 1 red, 2 green and 1 blue pixels.
- Tetracell also known as Quad Bayer or 4-cell. For darker scenes, signal processing can combine data from 2x2 pixel groups to essentially act like a larger pixel with a repeating 4×4 subpixel pattern with 4 red, 8 green and 4 blue subpixels. For brighter scenes, signal processing can convert the Tetracell into a conventional RGB filter to achieve 4x higher resolution. Resolution & pixel size listed below is after re-mosaic signal processing.
- Nonacell is similar to Tetracell, but with 3x3 pixel groups and a 6×6 pattern with 9 red, 18 green and 9 blue subpixels.
- ChameleonCell is similar to Tetracell and Nonacell, but with 4x4 pixel groups and a 8x8 pattern with 16 red, 32 green and 16 blue subpixels.

== List of sensors ==
Model (Part Number) Release date	Resolution	ADC accuracy (bits)	Output formats RAW (bits)	Diagonal in Optical format (or mm)	Pixel size (μm)	Pixel type	Color Filter	Auto Focus	Staggered HDR	Dual Conversion Gain	Products used in
ISOCELL KD1 (S5KKD1)	6560 x 4928 32 MP	10	8/10	1/3.42" (5.25 mm)	0.64	ISOCELL Plus	Tetrapixel RGB Bayer	Double Super PD		Smart-ISO	Rear: Xiaomi 14T; Xiaomi 14T Pro; Vivo X100 Pro; Vivo X200; Vivo X200 Pro
ISOCELL GN8 (S5KGN8)	8192 x 6144 50 Mp	10	10/12	1/1.95" (8.19 mm)	0.8	ISOCELL Plus	Tetrapixel RGB Bayer	Super QPD		Smart-ISO Pro, Dual Slope Gain	Rear: Motorola Razr 50 Ultra; Samsung Galaxy A35 5G
ISOCELL HP9 (S5KHP9) 2024.06.27	16320 x 12288 200 MP 8K@30 fps 4K@120 fps FHD@480 fps	10	10/12/14	1/1.4"	0.56	ISOCELL 3.0	Tetra^{2}pixel RGB Bayer	Super QPD	Yes	Smart-ISO Pro	Rear: Telephoto; Vivo X100 Ultra; Vivo X200 Pro; Vivo X200 Ultra; Xiaomi 15 Ultra
ISOCELL GNJ (S5KGNJ) 2024.06.27	8192 x 6144 50 MP 8K@30 fps 4K@120 fps FHD@480 fps	10	8/10/12/14	1/1.56"	1.0	ISOCELL 3.0	Dual Tetrapixel RGB Bayer	Dual Pixel Pro PD	Yes	Smart-ISO Pro	Rear: Nothing Phone (3a) Pro; Vivo S19; Vivo V40 5G
ISOCELL JN5 (S5KJN5) 2024.06.27	8192 x 6144 50 MP 4K@60 fps FHD@240 fps	10	10	1/2.76"	0.64	ISOCELL 3.0	Tetrapixel RGB Bayer	Super QPD	Yes	Dual Slope Gain	
ISOCELL GNK (S5KGNK)	8160 x 6144 50 MP Video: 8K@30 fps 4K@120 fps FHD@240 fps	10	8/10/12/14	1/1.3"	1.2	ISOCELL 3.0	Dual Tetrapixel RGB Bayer	Dual Pixel Pro PD	Yes	Smart-ISO Pro	Rear: Google Pixel 8 Google Pixel 8 Pro Google Pixel 9 Google Pixel 9 Pro Google Pixel 9 Pro XL
ISOCELL HP2 (S5KHP2) 2023.01.17	16384 x 12288 200 MP Video: 8K@30 fps 4K@120 fps	10	10/12	1/1.3" (12.31 mm)	0.6	ISOCELL 3.0	Tetra^{2}pixel RGB Bayer	Super QPD		Smart-ISO Pro	Rear: Samsung Galaxy S23 Ultra; Samsung Galaxy S24 Ultra; Samsung Galaxy S25 Ultra
ISOCELL HPX 2022.10.20	16320 x 12288 200 MP Video: 8K@30 fps 4K@120 fps	10	10/12/14	1/1.4" (11.43 mm)	0.56	ISOCELL 3.0	Tetra^{2}pixel RGB Bayer	Super QPD	Yes	Smart-ISO Pro	Rear: Xiaomi Redmi Note 12 Pro+
ISOCELL HP3 (S5KHP3) 2022.06.23	16320 x 12288 200 MP Video: 8K@30 fps 4K@120 fps	10	10/12/14	1/1.4" (11.43 mm)	0.56	ISOCELL 3.0	Tetra^{2}pixel RGB Bayer	Super QPD	Yes	Smart-ISO Pro	Rear: Honor 90 Pro; Honor 90; Realme 11 Pro+
ISOCELL HP1 (S5KHP1) 2021.09.02	16384 x 12288 200 Mp Video: 8K@30 fps	10	8/10/12	1/1.22" (13.11 mm)	0.64	ISOCELL 3.0	Tetra^{2}pixel RGB Bayer	Double Super PD	Yes	Smart-ISO Pro	Rear: Motorola Edge 30 Ultra (X30 Pro in China) Xiaomi 12T Pro; Infinix Zero Ultra
ISOCELL HM6 (S5KHM6) 2022.03.	12000 x 9000 108 Mp Video: 8K@24 fps	10	8/10/12	1/1.67" (9.58 mm)	0.64	ISOCELL 2.0	Nonapixel RGB Bayer	Super PD		Smart-ISO Pro	Rear: Infinix Note 12 Pro; Infinix Note 12 VIP; Motorola Moto G72; Oppo A1 Pro; Realme 9 4G; Realme 10 Pro; Realme 10 Pro+ Redmi K50 Ultra; Xiaomi 12T; Samsung Galaxy M53
ISOCELL HM3 (S5KHM3) 2021.01.14	12000 x 9000 108 Mp Video: 8K@30 fps	10	8/10/12	1/1.33" (12.03 mm)	0.8	ISOCELL Plus	Nonapixel RGB Bayer	Super PD Plus	Yes	Smart-ISO Pro	Rear: Samsung Galaxy S21 Ultra; Samsung Galaxy S22 Ultra
ISOCELL HM2 (S5KHM2) / 2020.09.15	12000 x 9000 108 Mp Video: 8K@24 fps	10	8/10	1/1.52" (10.53 mm)	0.7	ISOCELL Plus	Nonapixel RGB Bayer	Super PD		Smart-ISO	Rear: List: Honor 50 SE; Honor 50; Honor 50 Pro; Honor 60; Honor 60 Pro; Huawei Nova 9 SE; Infinix Zero X Pro; Motorola Edge 20 Lite; Motorola Edge 20; Motorola Edge 20 Pro; Motorola Edge (2021); Motorola Edge S30; Motorola Moto G60; Motorola Moto G200; Samsung Galaxy A73 5G; Xiaomi Poco X4 Pro 5G; Redmi K40 Pro+; Redmi K50 Pro; Redmi Note 9 Pro 5G; Redmi Note 10/Redmi Note 10 Pro (outside China); Redmi Note 10 Pro Max; Redmi Note 11 Pro/E Pro/Pro+ (China); Redmi Note 11 Pro/Pro 5G (international); Redmi Note 11 S 4G; Realme 8 Pro; Vivo S10 Pro; Vivo S12; Vivo S12 Pro; Vivo V23 Pro; Xiaomi Mi MIX Fold; Xiaomi Mi 10i; Xiaomi Mi 11i; Xiaomi 11T; Xiaomi 11T Pro; Xiaomi Black Shark 5 Pro; ZTE Axon 40 Pro; Infinix GT 30 Pro
ISOCELL HMX (S5KHMX) / 2019.08.12	12032 x 9024 108 Mp Video: 6016 x 3384 @ 30 fps	10	10	1/1.33" (12.03 mm)	0.8	ISOCELL Plus	Tetrapixel RGB Bayer	Super PD		Smart-ISO	Rear: List: Motorola Edge+ (2020); Xiaomi Mi CC9 Pro (Note 10); Xiaomi Mi CC9 Pro Premium Edition (Note 10 Pro); Xiaomi Mi 10; Xiaomi Mi 10 Pro; Xiaomi Mi 10S; Xiaomi Mi 10T Pro; Xiaomi Mi 11; Xiaomi MIX 4; Smartisan R2
ISOCELL HM1 (S5KHM1) / 2020.02.12	12000 x 9000 108 Mp Video: 8K@24 fps	10	8/10	1/1.33" (12.03 mm)	0.8	ISOCELL Plus	Nonapixel RGB Bayer	Super PD		Smart-ISO	Rear: Samsung Galaxy S20 Ultra; Samsung Galaxy Note 20 Ultra
ISOCELL GW3 (S5KGW3) / 2020.09.15	9280 x 6944 64 Mp Video: 3840 x 2160 @ 60 fps	10	10	1/1.97" (8.12 mm)	0.7	ISOCELL Plus	Tetrapixel RGB Bayer	Super PD		Smart-ISO	Rear: List: Meizu 18x; Samsung Galaxy A32; Samsung Galaxy M52 5G; Xiaomi Black Shark 4 Pro; Xiaomi Black Shark 4S Pro; Xiaomi Black Shark 5; Xiaomi Black Shark 5 RS; Xiaomi Civi; Xiaomi Civi 1S; Xiaomi Mi 11 Lite; Xiaomi Mi 11 Lite 5G; Xiaomi 11 Lite 5G NE; Redmi Note 10 pro; Vivo iQOO Z3; Vivo iQOO Z5; Vivo S9; Vivo S10e; Vivo T1; Vivo Y53s 4G; ZTE Nubia Red Magic 6/6 Pro/6S Pro; ZTE Nubia Red Magic 7/7 Pro; ZTE Nubia Red Magic 7S/7S Pro
ISOCELL GW2 (S5KGW2) / 2020.	9280 x 6944 64 Mp Video: 7680 x 4320 @ 24 fps	10	8/10	1/1.72" (9.21 mm)	0.8	ISOCELL Plus	RGB Bayer	Super PD			Rear: Telephoto; Samsung Galaxy S20; Samsung Galaxy S20+ Samsung Galaxy S21; Samsung Galaxy S21+ Samsung Galaxy Note 20
ISOCELL GW1 (S5KGW1) / 2019.05.09	9280 x 6944 64 Mp Video: 7680 x 4320 @ 24 fps	10	8/10	1/1.72" (9.21 mm)	0.8	ISOCELL Plus	Tetrapixel RGB Bayer	Super PD		Smart-ISO	Rear: List: LG V60 ThinQ; Motorola Edge; Motorola One Fusion+; Oppo K5; Oppo Reno3 Pro; Realme 6 / 6 Pro; Realme XT; Realme X2 / X2 Pro; Realme X3 / X3 Superzoom; Realme X50 / X50 Pro; Realme GT Neo2; Redmi Note 8 Pro; Redmi Note 9 Pro; Redmi Note 11T Pro (K50i/POCO X4 GT); Redmi Note 11T Pro+; Samsung Galaxy A70s; Samsung Galaxy A71; Samsung Galaxy F41; Samsung Galaxy M31; TCL 10 Pro; TCL 10 5G; Vivo V20 Pro; Vivo S7; Vivo S10; Vivo NEX 3 / NEX 3S; Vivo iQOO Neo6; Vivo iQOO Neo6 SE
ISOCELL GN9 (S5KGN9) / 2023	8160 x 6144 50 Mp	10	10	1/1.57" (10.21 mm)	1.0	ISOCELL Plus	Tetrapixel RGB Bayer	Super PD	Yes		Rear: Nothing Phone (2a); Nothing Phone (3a)
ISOCELL GN5 (S5KGN5) / 2021.09.02	8160 x 6144 50 Mp Video: 7680 x 4320 @ 30 fps	10	8/10/12	1/1.57" (10.19 mm)	1.0	ISOCELL 2.0	Dual Tetrapixel RGB Bayer	Dual Pixel Pro PD	Yes	Smart-ISO Pro	Rear: Samsung Galaxy S22; Samsung Galaxy S22+ Vivo iQOO 9 Vivo iQOO 9 Pro; Vivo iQOO 10 (iQOO 9T in India); Vivo iQOO 10 Pro; Vivo X Fold Vivo X Fold+
ISOCELL GN3 (S5KGN3) 2022.08.13	8160 x 6144 50 Mp Video: 7680 x 4320 @ 30 fps	10	8/10/12	1/1.57" (10.19 mm)	1.0	ISOCELL 2.0	Dual Tetrapixel RGB Bayer	Dual Pixel PD	Yes	Smart-ISO Pro	Rear: Samsung Galaxy S23; Samsung Galaxy S23+ Samsung Galaxy S24 Samsung Galaxy S24+ Samsung Galaxy Z Fold 4
ISOCELL GN2 (S5KGN2) / 2021.02.23	8160 x 6144 50 Mp Video: 7680 x 4320 @ 24 fps	10	8/10	1/1.12" (14.28 mm)	1.4	ISOCELL Plus	Dual Tetrapixel RGB Bayer	Dual Pixel Pro PD	Yes	Smart-ISO Pro	Rear: Xiaomi Mi 11 Pro; Xiaomi Mi 11 Ultra Honor Magic4 Ultimate
ISOCELL GN1 (S5KGN1) / 2020.05.19	8160 x 6144 50 Mp Video: 7680 x 4320 @ 30 fps	10	8/10	1/1.31" (12.21 mm)	1.2	ISOCELL Plus	Dual Tetrapixel RGB Bayer	Dual PD		Smart-ISO	Rear: Pixel 6 Pixel 6 Pro; Pixel 7 Pixel 7 Pro; Meizu 18 Pro; Meizu 18s Pro; Tecno Phantom X Vivo X50 Pro+ Vivo X60 Pro+ Vivo X70 Pro+ Vivo X Note; Vivo iQOO 5 Vivo iQOO 5 Pro
ISOCELL JN1 (S5KJN1) / 2021.06.10	8160 x 6144 50 Mp Video: 3840 x 2160 @ 60 fps	10	10	1/2.76" (6.54 mm)	0.64	ISOCELL 2.0	Tetrapixel RGB Bayer	Double Super PD		Smart-ISO	Rear: List: Infinix Note 12; Infinix Note 12 5G; Motorola Moto G31; Motorola Moto G32; Motorola Moto G42; Motorola Moto G51 5G; Motorola Moto G52; Motorola Moto G62 5G; Motorola Moto G71 5G; Motorola Moto G82; Motorola Moto G 5G (2022); Motorola Moto G Power (2022); Motorola Moto Edge 30 Pro/X30 (ultrawide); Motorola Edge 30 Ultra/X30 Pro (ultrawide); Xiaomi 12 Pro (ultrawide); Xiaomi 12S Pro (ultrawide); Xiaomi Pad 5 Pro 12.4; Nokia G21; Nokia G60 5G; Nothing Phone (1) (ultrawide); Nothing Phone (2) (ultrawide); Nubia Z40 Pro (ultrawide); Nubia Z40S Pro (ultrawide); Realme 8i; Realme 9i; Realme 9 5G; Realme Narzo 50; Realme Narzo 50A; Realme GT2 Pro (ultrawide); Realme GT2 Explorer Master (ultrawide); Samsung Galaxy A13 5G; Samsung Galaxy A23; Samsung Galaxy M13 5G; Samsung Galaxy M23; Tecno Pova 3; TCL 30 SE; TCL 30+; TCL 30 5G; TCL Stylus 5G; Poco M4 Pro 5G; Redmi 10; Redmi 10C; Redmi Note 11 4G; Redmi Note 11S 5G; Vivo S15e; Vivo iQOO Neo5 SE; Vivo iQOO 9 Pro (ultrawide); Vivo iQOO 10 Pro (ultrawide)
ISOCELL GM5 (S5KGM5) / 2020.09.15	8064 x 6048 48 Mp Video: 7680 x 4320 @ 30 fps	10	8/10	1/2.55" (7.06 mm)	0.7	ISOCELL 2.0	Tetrapixel RGB Bayer	Super PD	Yes	Smart-ISO	Telephoto: Google Pixel 7 Pro
ISOCELL GM2 (S5KGM2) / 2019.05.09	8000 x 6000 48 Mp Video: 3840 x 2160 @ 60 fps	10	8/10	1/2.0" (8 mm)	0.8	ISOCELL Plus	Tetrapixel RGB Bayer	Super PD		Smart-ISO	Rear: LG Velvet; Vivo S5; Vivo S6; Poco M2 Pro; Redmi Note 9 Pro (India); Redmi Note 9S; Redmi Note 9T; Redmi Note 10 Lite; Samsung Galaxy A12/F12/M12; Samsung Galaxy A21s; Samsung Galaxy A22 5G; Samsung Galaxy A32 5G; Samsung Galaxy A42 5G/M42 5G Samsung Galaxy M32 5G
ISOCELL GM1 (S5KGM1) / 2018.10.30	8000 x 6000 48 Mp Video: 3840 x 2160 @ 60 fps	10	8/10	1/2.0" (8 mm)	0.8	ISOCELL Plus	Tetrapixel RGB Bayer	PD			Rear: Fairphone 3+ Lenovo Z6 Pro; Meizu 16Xs/Note 9 Motorola One Fusion; Motorola One Vision; OnePlus Nord N300; Oppo A93; Oppo F11/F11 Pro; Oppo F17 Pro; Poco M3; Realme 7 5G; Realme V5 5G; Realme Q2; Realme Q3; Realme Q3i; Realme Q3s; Redmi Note 7 Redmi Note 8 Redmi Note 9 Samsung Galaxy S10 Lite; Samsung Galaxy A90 5G; Samsung Galaxy M30s; Vivo iQOO Neo3; Vivo iQOO Neo5 Lite; Vivo iQOO Z1; Vivo X27 (128GB); ZTE Axon 10 Pro
ISOCELL GH1 (S5KGH1) / 2019.09.24	7968 x 5480 43.7 Mp Video: 3840 x 2160 @ 60 fps	10	10	1/2.65" (6.77 mm)	0.7	ISOCELL Plus	Tetrapixel RGB Bayer	Super PD			Front: Oppo Reno3 Pro; Samsung Galaxy S20 Ultra; Samsung Galaxy S21 Ultra; Vivo S7; Vivo S7t; Vivo S9; Vivo V20; Vivo V20 2021; Vivo V20 Pro; Vivo V21e (global); Vivo V21
ISOCELL JD1 (S5KJD1) / 2020.09.15	6560 x 4920 32 Mp	10	10	1/3.14" (5.1 mm)	0.7	ISOCELL Plus	Tetrapixel RGB Bayer	Super PD	Yes	Smart-ISO	Front: Honor 50
ISOCELL GD2 (S5KGD2)	6560 x 4928 32 Mp	10	8/10	1/2.8"	0.8	ISOCELL Plus	Tetrapixel RGB Bayer	PD			Front: Tecno Camon 19 Pro
ISOCELL GD1 (S5KGD1) / 2018.10.30	6560 x 4928 32 Mp	10	8/10	1/2.80" (6.4 mm)	0.8	ISOCELL Plus	Tetrapixel RGB Bayer	PD			Front: Infinix S4; LG V50S/G8X ThinQ; Honor 20; Honor 20 Pro; Honor 20S; Huawei P30/P30 Pro; Samsung Galaxy A71 Vivo V15/Vivo V15 Pro; Xiaomi Redmi Y3 Rear: Samsung Galaxy A70; Samsung Galaxy A60
ISOCELL 2L3 (SAK2L3)	4032 x 3024 12.2 Mp Video: 3840 x 2160 @ 60 fps	10	8/10	1/2.55" (7.06 mm)	1.4	ISOCELL	RGB Bayer	Dual Pixel PD			Rear: Samsung Galaxy Note 9
ISOCELL 2L1 (S5K2L1)	4032 x 3024 12.2 Mp	10	8/10	1/2.6" (7.06 mm)	1.4	ISOCELL	RGB Bayer	Dual Pixel PD			Rear: Samsung Galaxy S7^{1} Samsung Galaxy S7 Edge^{1} Samsung Galaxy S7 Active^{1} Samsung Galaxy Note 7/FE
ISOCELL 2L2 (S5K2L2)	4032 x 3024; 12.2 Mp	10	8/10	1/2.55" (7.06 mm)	1.4	ISOCELL	RGB Bayer	Dual Pixel PD			Rear: Samsung Galaxy S8^{4} Samsung Galaxy S8+^{4} Samsung Galaxy Note 8
ISOCELL 2L3 (S5K2L3)	4032 x 3024; 12.2 Mp Video: 3840 x 2160 @ 60 fps			1/2.55" (7.06 mm)	1.4	ISOCELL Plus	RGB				Rear: Samsung Galaxy S9^{4} Samsung Galaxy S9+^{4}
ISOCELL 2L4 (S5K2L4)	4032 x 3024; 12.2 Mp Video: 3840 x 2160 @ 60 fps	10	8/10	1/2.55" (7.06 mm)	1.4	ISOCELL Plus	RGB Bayer	Dual Pixel PD			Rear: Samsung Galaxy S10; Samsung Galaxy S10+ Samsung Galaxy S10e; Samsung Galaxy Z Flip; Samsung Galaxy Z Flip 3
ISOCELL 2L7 (S5K2L7)	4032 x 3024 12.2 Mp	10	8/10	1/2.56" (7.06 mm)	1.4	ISOCELL	RGB Bayer	Dual Pixel PD			Rear: BQ Aquaris X PRO; Motorola Moto X4 (Main); Motorola Moto G6 Plus (Main); Motorola Moto G6 (Main); Motorola P30; Nokia 8 Sirocco; Sharp Aquos S2; Xiaomi Mi Note 10 (CC9 Pro) (2x telephoto); Xiaomi Mi 10 Pro (2x telephoto); Xiaomi Redmi Note 5 (China); Xiaomi Redmi Note 6 Pro
ISOCELL 2L8 (S5K2L8)	4032 x 3024 12.2 Mp	10	8/10	1/2.80" (6.4 mm)	1.28	ISOCELL	RGB Bayer	Dual Pixel PD			Rear: BQ Aquaris X2; BQ Aquaris X2 PRO; Vsmart Active 1 Vsmart Active 1+ Front: Vivo X20; Vivo X20 Plus; Vivo X20 Plus UD; Vivo X21; Vivo X21 UD
ISOCELL 2L9 (S5K2L9)	4032 x 3024 12.2 Mp			1/2.55" (7.06 mm)	1.4	ISOCELL	RGB				Rear: Vivo X20; Vivo X20 Plus; Vivo X20 Plus UD; Vivo X21; Vivo X21 UD
ISOCELL 2LD (S5K2LD)	4032 x 3024 12.2 Mp Video: 3840 x 2160 @ 60 fps			1/1.76" (9.072 mm)	1.8	ISOCELL Plus	RGB	Dual PD			Rear: Samsung Galaxy S20; Samsung Galaxy S20+ Samsung Galaxy S20 FE; Samsung Galaxy S21^{12} Samsung Galaxy S21+ Samsung Galaxy Note 20; Samsung Galaxy Z Flip 4
ISOCELL 2M8 (S5K2M8)	4208 x 3120; 13 Mp			1/2.60" (6.828 mm)	1.34	ISOCELL	RGB				Rear: ZUK Z2 (Lenovo Z2 Plus); ZUK Edge
ISOCELL 2P2 (S5K2P2)	5312 x 2988; 16 Mp			1/2.60" (6.828 mm)	1.12	ISOCELL	RGB				Rear: Samsung Galaxy S5; Samsung Galaxy S6^{2} Samsung Galaxy S6 edge^{2} Samsung Galaxy S6 edge+^{2} Samsung Galaxy Note 4 Samsung Galaxy Note 5^{2} Samsung Galaxy A8 (2016)
ISOCELL 2P7 (S5K2P7)	4640 x 3488 16 Mp	10	8/10	1/2.80"	1.12	ISOCELL	RGB Bayer	Super PD			Rear: LG V20; Meizu M6S; Oukitel WP2; Umdigi Z2 Special Edition; Umdigi Z2 Pro; Umdigi F1
ISOCELL 2P8 (S5K2P8)	5336 x 3000 16 Mp			1/2.60" (6.828 mm)	1.12	ISOCELL	RGB				Rear: Lenovo Vibe Shot
ISOCELL 2T8 (S5K2T8)	5976 x 3368; 20 Mp			1/2.60" (6.828 mm)	1.1	ISOCELL	RGB				Rear: ZTE Axon 7
ISOCELL 3H1 (S5K3H1)	3280 x 2464 8 Mp			1/3.60"	1.22	ISOCELL	RGB				Front: Samsung Galaxy S8^{9} Samsung Galaxy S9+ Samsung Galaxy Note 8
ISOCELL 3H2 (S5K3H2)	3264 x 2448; 8 Mp			1/3.20" (5.68 mm)	1.4	ISOCELL	RGB				Rear: Samsung Galaxy S2; Samsung Galaxy S3 (some models); Xiaomi Redmi 1/1S
ISOCELL 3J1 (S5K3J1)	3648 x 2736; 10 Mp			1/3.20" (5.57 mm)	1.22	ISOCELL Plus	RGB				Front: Samsung Galaxy S10^{10} Rear: Samsung Galaxy S21 Ultra (3x and 10x telephoto)
ISOCELL 3L2 (S5K3L2)	4208 x 3120; 13 Mp			1/3.06" (5.867 mm)	1.12	ISOCELL	RGB				Rear: Samsung Galaxy A3 (2016); Samsung Galaxy A5 (2016); Samsung Galaxy E7; Samsung Galaxy J5 (2016); Samsung Galaxy J7 (2016); Samsung Galaxy On Nxt; Xiaomi Redmi Note 3G; Xiaomi Redmi Note 4G; Xiaomi Redmi Note Prime Samsung Galaxy J4
ISOCELL 3L8 (S5K3L8)	4208 x 3120; 13 Mp			1/3.06" (5.867 mm)	1.12	ISOCELL	RGB/BW				Rear: Xiaomi Redmi 3/S/X/Pro; Xiaomi Redmi Note 4/X; Xiaomi Redmi 4/X; Xiaomi Redmi Note 5A (Y1 Lite in India)
ISOCELL 3M2 (S5K3M2)	4208 x 3120; 13 Mp			1/3.06" (5.867 mm)	1.12	ISOCELL	RGB				Rear: OnePlus X^{3} Xiaomi Mi 4 Xiaomi Mi 4c^{3} Xiaomi Mi Note/Pro; Xiaomi Redmi Note 2 Xiaomi Redmi Note 3 (Mediatek)
ISOCELL 3M3 (S5K3M3 & S5K3M3+)	4208 x 3120; 13 Mp	10	8/10	1/3.4"	1.0	ISOCELL	RGB Bayer	PD			Secondary rear: LG V30; Samsung Galaxy S9+ Samsung Galaxy S10; Samsung Galaxy Note 8 Samsung Galaxy Note 9 Sony Xperia 1(telephoto, ultra-wide); Sony Xperia 5(telephoto, ultrawide); Xiaomi Mi 6 Xiaomi Mi 8 Xiaomi Mi 8 Pro; Xiaomi Mi MIX 2s Xiaomi Mi MIX 3 Xiaomi Mi Note 3 Xiaomi Mi Max 2 (partly)^{7}
ISOCELL 3M5 (S5K3M5)	4208 x 3120; 13 Mp			1/3.40"	1.0	ISOCELL	RGB				Third rear: LG G8 ThinQ; Xiaomi Mi 9
ISOCELL 3P3 (S5K3P3)	5312 x 2988; 16 Mp			1/3.06" (5.867 mm)	1.0	ISOCELL	RGB				Rear: Oukitel K6; Samsung Galaxy C5; Samsung Galaxy C7; Ulefone T1; Ulefone Future; Vernee Apollo Lite, Xiaomi Mi Max; Xiaomi Redmi Note 3 (Snapdragon); Xiaomi Redmi Note 3 Pro
ISOCELL 3P8 (S5K3P8)	4640 x 3488; 16 Mp			1/3.10" (6.4 mm)	1.0	ISOCELL	RGB/Tetracell				Rear: Blackview BV9600; Doogee V Samsung Galaxy A5 (2017); Samsung Galaxy A7 (2017); Samsung Galaxy C5 Pro; Samsung Galaxy C7 Pro; Samsung Galaxy C9 Pro; Umidigi Z2 Front: Xiaomi Redmi Note 5A Prime (Y1 in India); Xiaomi Redmi S2 (Y2 in India)
ISOCELL 3P9 (S5K3P9)	4608 x 3456; 16 Mp			1/3.10" (6.4 mm)	1.0	ISOCELL	RGB/Tetracell				Third rear: Samsung Galaxy S10Samsung Galaxy S10+ Samsung Galaxy S10 5G Second rear: Samsung Galaxy S10e; Samsung Galaxy Z Flip; Samsung Galaxy Z Flip 3^{11}
ISOCELL 3T1 (S5K3T1SP - Tetrapixel, S5K3T1SX - RGB)	5184 x 3880 20 Mp	10	8/10	1/3.0" (6.4 mm)	0.9	ISOCELL	Tetrapixel/RGB	Contrast			Front: Xiaomi Mi 8 Xiaomi Mi 8 Pro; Xiaomi Mi 8 Explorer Edition; Xiaomi Mi 8 SE; Xiaomi Redmi Note 6 Pro; Xiaomi Redmi Note 8 Pro; Xiaomi Pocophone F1; Xiaomi Mi 9 Xiaomi Mi 9 SE
ISOCELL 3T2 (S5K3T2)	5184 x 3880 20 Mp			1/3.40"	0.8	ISOCELL Plus	Tetracell				Front: Xiaomi Mi 10; Xiaomi Mi 10 Pro; Xiaomi Mi 10 Ultra; Xiaomi Mi 11; Xiaomi Poco X3 Pro Rear: Sony Xperia 1 II (telephoto); Sony Xperia 5 II (telephoto)
ISOCELL 4E6 (S5K4E6)	2592 x 1944 5 Mp			1/4" (4.5 mm)	1.34	ISOCELL	RGB				Front: HTC 10; Samsung Galaxy S6; Samsung Galaxy S6 edge Samsung Galaxy S6 edge+ Samsung Galaxy S7; Samsung Galaxy S7 Edge; Samsung Galaxy Note 5 Samsung Galaxy Note 7/FE; Samsung Galaxy Tab S3
ISOCELL 4E8 (S5K4E8)	2592 x 1944 5 Mp			1/4" (4.5 mm)	1.4	ISOCELL Bright	RGB/BW				Secondary rear: Vivo X20 (2nd rear); Vivo X20 Plus (2nd rear); Vivo X20 Plus UD (2nd rear); Vivo X21 (2nd rear); Vivo X21 UD (2nd rear)
ISOCELL 4H5 (S5K4H5)	3264 x 2448 8 Mp			1/4" (4.5 mm)	1.12	BSI(~YB)/ ISOCELL(~YC)	RGB				Rear: Blackview A7; Intex Aqua Note 5.5; Samsung Galaxy Tab S2
ISOCELL 4H7 (S5K4H7)	3264 x 2448 8 Mp			1/4" (4.5 mm)	1.12	BSI	RGB				Front: Sony Xperia 1 Sony Xperia 5 Sony Xperia 10/10 Plus; Sony Xperia 1 II; Sony Xperia 5 II; Sony Xperia 10 II; Sony Xperia L3; Sony Xperia L4 Rear ultrawide: Meizu 17
S5K5BAF	1600 x 1200			1/5"	1.75	FSI	RGB				Front: Samsung Galaxy S2
S5K5E2	2560 x 1920 5 Mp			1/5" (5.08 mm)	1.12	BSI	RGB				Rear: Motorola Moto E (2015) Front: HTC One (M8)
S5K5E3	2576 x 1932; 5 Mp			1/4" (4.5 mm)	1.12	BSI	RGB				Front: Huawei Honor 3C; Samsung Galaxy A3 (2016); Samsung Galaxy A5 (2016); Samsung Galaxy A7 (2016)
S5K5E8	2592 x 1944 5 Mp			1/5" (5.08 mm)	1.12	BSI	RGB/BW				Front: Xiaomi Redmi Note 4/4X; Xiaomi Mi Max 1/2; Xiaomi Redmi Note 5A Secondary rear: Xiaomi Redmi Note 5 Pro; Xiaomi Redmi Note 5 AI Dual Camera; Xiaomi Redmi S2 (Y2 in India)
S5K6A3	1412 x 1412			1/6" (3 mm)	1.75	BSI	RGB				Front: Samsung Galaxy S3
S5K6B2	1936 x 1036; 2 Mp			1/6" (3 mm)	1.34	BSI	RGB				Front: Samsung Galaxy S4; Samsung Galaxy Note 3 Samsung Galaxy Tab S Samsung Galaxy Tab S2
S5K6D1	2560 x 1440; 3.7 Mp			1/5" (3.6 mm)	1.12	BSI	RGB				Front: Samsung Galaxy Note 4

^{1}: The Galaxy S7 family utilizes either one of two sensors: the Samsung S5K2L1 or the Sony IMX260. They are regarded as nearly identical sensors.

^{2}: The Galaxy S6 family and Note 5 utilizes either one of two sensors: the Samsung S5K2P2 or the Sony IMX240. They are regarded as nearly identical sensors.

^{3}: The Xiaomi Mi 4C and Oneplus X utilize either one of two sensors: the Samsung S5K3M2 or the Sony IMX258. They are similar sensors, but the IMX258 is a newer unit.

^{4}: The Galaxy S8 family utilizes either one of two sensors: the Samsung S5K2L2 or the Sony IMX333. They are regarded as nearly identical sensors.

^{5}: The Xiaomi Mi 6 has two sensors. One of the two sensors is S5K3M3, another is Sony IMX386.

^{6}: The Meizu Pro 6 family utilizes either one of two sensors: the Samsung S5K3M3 or the Sony IMX386, They are regarded as nearly identical sensors

^{7}: The Xiaomi Mi Max 2 utilizes either one of two sensors: the Samsung S5K3M3 or the Sony IMX386. They are regarded as nearly identical sensors

^{8}: The Samsung Galaxy S9 and S9+ utilize either one of two sensors: the Samsung S5K2L3 or the Sony IMX345. Both feature stacked LPDDR4 DRAM in the CMOS sensor.

^{9}: The Galaxy S8 family utilizes either one of two sensors: the Samsung S5K3H1 or the Sony IMX320. They are regarded as nearly identical sensors.

^{10}: The Galaxy S10 family utilizes either one of two sensors: the Samsung S5K3J1 or the Sony IMX374. They are regarded as nearly identical sensors.

^{11}: The Galaxy Z Flip's ultra-wide camera utilizes the 16 Mp sensor, but images are cropped down to 12 Mp.

^{12}: The Galaxy S21 and S21+ utilizes either one of two sensors: the Samsung 2LD (Exynos variant) or the Sony IMX555 (Snapdragon variant). They are regarded as nearly identical sensors.

^{13}: The backlight sensor is a special photographic sensor. It allows you to take high quality, clear photos in low light. The BSI sensor improves image sharpness during shooting.

== See also ==
- Exmor
- Bionz – image processor
- HAD CCD – Sony
- Expeed – Nikon image/video processors
- Toshiba CMOS
- OmniVision
