= Redmi Note 6 Pro =

Smartphone model developed by Xiaomi

Xiaomi Redmi Note 6 Pro
- Manufacturer: Xiaomi
- Type: Smartphone
- Series: Xiaomi Redmi Note
- First released: October 2018; 7 years ago
- Predecessor: Redmi Note 5 Pro
- Successor: Redmi Note 7 Pro
- Form factor: Slate
- Dimensions: H: 157.9 mm (6.22 in); W: 76.4 mm (3.01 in); D: 8.3 mm (0.33 in)
- Weight: 182 g (6.4 oz)
- Operating system: MIUI 12 based on Android 9 Pie
- System-on-chip: Qualcomm SDM636 Snapdragon 636
- CPU: Octa-core (4x 1.8 GHz Performance Kryo 260 cores based on Cortex A73 + 4x 1.6 GHz efficiency Kryo 260 cores based on Cortex A53)
- GPU: Adreno 509
- Memory: 3 or 4 or 6 GB LPDDR4X RAM
- Storage: 32 GB or 64 GB
- Removable storage: microSDXC, expandable up to 256 GB (uses SIM 2 slot)
- Battery: Non-removable Li-Po 4000 mAh battery
- Rear camera: 12 MP (f/1.9, 1.4 μm) Dual-PD + 5 MP (f/2.2, 1.12 μm) phase detection autofocus, LED flash, Geo-tagging, touch focus, face detection, panorama, HDR
- Front camera: 20 MP (f/2.0, 0.9 μm)+ 2 MP (f/2.2, 1.75 μm)
- Display: 6.26 inches, 1080 x 2280 pixels, 19:9 ratio (403 ppi), IPS LCD capacitive touchscreen, 16M colors
- Connectivity: 2G, 3G, 4G, 4G LTE, Wi-Fi 802.11a/b/g/n/ac (2.4 & 5GHz), dual-band, WiFi Direct, hotspot Bluetooth V5, A2DP, Low-energy
- Codename: TULIP; TWOLIP
- Website: www.mi.com/bd/redmi-note-6-pro

Xiaomi Redmi Note 6 Pro is a smartphone developed by Xiaomi Inc. The phone comes in three variants, the base model comes with 3 GB RAM and 32 GB of internal storage. A variant with 4 GB RAM and 64 GB of internal storage is available for a price tag of ₹13,999 (US$150). The top-end model of the device packs 6 GB RAM and 64 GB of internal storage, which is expandable via a microSD card up to 256 GB. The phone is a mid-range derivative of the flagship Xiaomi Mi 8, sharing similar design elements including its notch display and dual-camera placement, both of which resemble that of iPhone X.

The smartphone was discontinued to make a room for its upgraded successors like Redmi Note 7 and Redmi Note 8.

== Specifications ==
The Redmi Note 6 Pro comes with a 6.26-inch Full HD+ IPS LCD with an aspect ratio of 19:9. The phone is powered by a 1.8 GHz (Max.)octa-core Snapdragon 636 processor paired with Adreno 509 GPU. The device is available in four colours including red, blue, black, and rose gold. It has 4000 mAh battery and supports Qualcomm's Quick Charge 3.0. The Xiaomi Redmi Note 6 Pro has a P2i Nano coating as a liquid repellent.

The construction of the device itself was enhanced with four cameras in total - two on the front and two on the back. This was the first time a Redmi device was being constructed using 6000 series aluminium. This was also the first Redmi Note phone with four cameras.

== See also ==
- Redmi
- Redmi Note 5
- Redmi Note 4
- Redmi Note Prime
- Redmi Note 9 Pro Max
