= Xiaomi Redmi Pro =

2016 Android smartphone

- Manufacturer: Xiaomi
- Type: Phablet
- Series: Redmi
- First released: July 27, 2016; 9 years ago
- Availability by region: August 2016; 9 years ago China
- Related: Xiaomi Redmi Note 4
- Compatible networks: GSM, 3G, 4G (LTE)
- Form factor: Slate
- Colors: Gray, Silver, and Gold
- Dimensions: 151.5×76.2×8.2 mm (5.96×3.00×0.32 in)
- Weight: 174 g (6 oz)
- Operating system: Original: Android 6.0 Marshmallow + MIUI 8 Current: Android 6.0 Marshmallow + MIUI 10
- System-on-chip: Redmi Pro: MediaTek MT6797 Helio X20 (20 nm); Redmi Pro High/Exclusive Edition: MediaTek MT6797T Helio X25 (20 nm)
- CPU: 10-core Redmi Pro: 2×2.1 GHz Cortex-A72 & 4×1.85 GHz Cortex-A53 & 4×1.4 GHz Cortex-A53; Redmi Pro High Edition: 2×2.3 GHz Cortex-A72 & 4×2 GHz Cortex-A53 & 4×1.55 GHz Cortex-A53; Redmi Pro Exclusive Edition: 2×2.5 GHz Cortex-A72 & 4×2 GHz Cortex-A53 & 4×1.55 GHz Cortex-A53
- GPU: Mali-T880 MP4
- Memory: Redmi Pro/High Edition: 3 GB; Redmi Pro Exclusive Edition: 4 GB; LPDDR3
- Storage: Redmi Pro: 32 GB; Redmi Pro High Edition: 64 GB; Redmi Pro Exclusive Edition: 128 GB eMMC 5.1
- Removable storage: microSDXC up to 128 GB
- SIM: Hybrid Dual SIM (Nano-SIM + Micro-SIM)
- Battery: Non-removable, Li-Ion 4050 mAh
- Charging: 10 W
- Rear camera: 13 MP Sony IMX258, f/2.0, 26 mm (Wide-angle lens), 1/3.06", 1.12 µm, PDAF, ISO 100 - 3200 + 5 MP Samsung S5K5E8, f/2.4 (depth sensor); 2-LED dual-tone flash, HDR, panorama Video: 1080p@30fps
- Front camera: 5 MP, f/2.0 Video: 1080p@30fps
- Display: AMOLED, 5.5", 1080 x 1920 (Full HD), 16:9, 401 ppi
- Sound: Mono
- Connectivity: USB-C 2.0, 3.5 mm Audio, Bluetooth 4.2 (A2DP, LE), IR port, Wi-Fi 802.11 b/g/n (Wi-Fi Direct), GPS (A-GPS), GLONASS, BeiDou
- Data inputs: Touchscreen Multi-touch, 2 microphones, fingerprint scanner (home button), accelerometer, gyroscope, Proximity sensor, compass
- Codename: omega
- Made in: China
- Website: Official website (Chinese)

The Xiaomi Redmi Pro is a mid-range smartphone developed by Xiaomi as part of the Redmi series. It was the first smartphone in the Redmi line to feature a dual camera setup. It was introduced on July 27, 2016.

The Redmi Pro is divided into a standard model, High Edition, and Exclusive Edition, differing in processors and memory configurations.

== Specifications ==
=== Design ===
The front panel is made of glass, and the body is made of brushed aluminium. From the back, the Redmi Pro is similar to the Xiaomi Redmi Note 4 series, with differences in the body texture and the placement of the second camera where the fingerprint scanner is located on the Redmi Note 4. On the Redmi Pro, the fingerprint scanner is located on the bottom bezel of the display and functions as a home button.

The bottom houses the USB-C connector and the speaker and microphone grilles; the top features a 3.5 mm audio jack, a second microphone, and an IR port. On the left is a hybrid slot with one slot for a SIM card and another for a SIM card or a microSD card up to 128 GB. On the right are the volume rocker and the lock button.

The Redmi Pro was sold in three colors: Gray, Silver, and Gold.

=== Hardware ===
The standard version of the Redmi Pro features a MediaTek Helio X20 CPU with a maximum clock speed of 2.1 GHz, while the Redmi Pro High and Exclusive Editions received the overclocked Helio X25 with maximum clock speeds of 2.3 GHz and 2.5 GHz, respectively. All versions use the Mali-T880 MP4 GPU. The standard configuration was sold with 3/32 GB, the High Edition with 3/64 GB, and the Exclusive Edition with 4/128 GB.

It has a Li-ion battery with a capacity of 4050 mAh.

The Redmi Pro features a 5.5-inch AMOLED display with a resolution of Full HD (1920 × 1080), a 16:9 aspect ratio, and a pixel density of 401 ppi.

The smartphone features a dual main camera system with a 13 MP main lens with an aperture of f/2.0 and phase-detection autofocus (PDAF), a 5 MP depth sensor with an aperture of f/2.4, and a 5 MP front camera with an aperture of f/2.0. Both the main and front cameras can record video at resolutions up to 1080p@30fps.

=== Software ===
The Redmi Pro was released with MIUI 8, based on Android 6.0 Marshmallow, and was later updated to MIUI 10.
