= Redmi Note 5 =

2018 Android Smartphones manufactured by Xiaomi

Xiaomi Redmi Note 5 Xiaomi Redmi Note 5 Pro

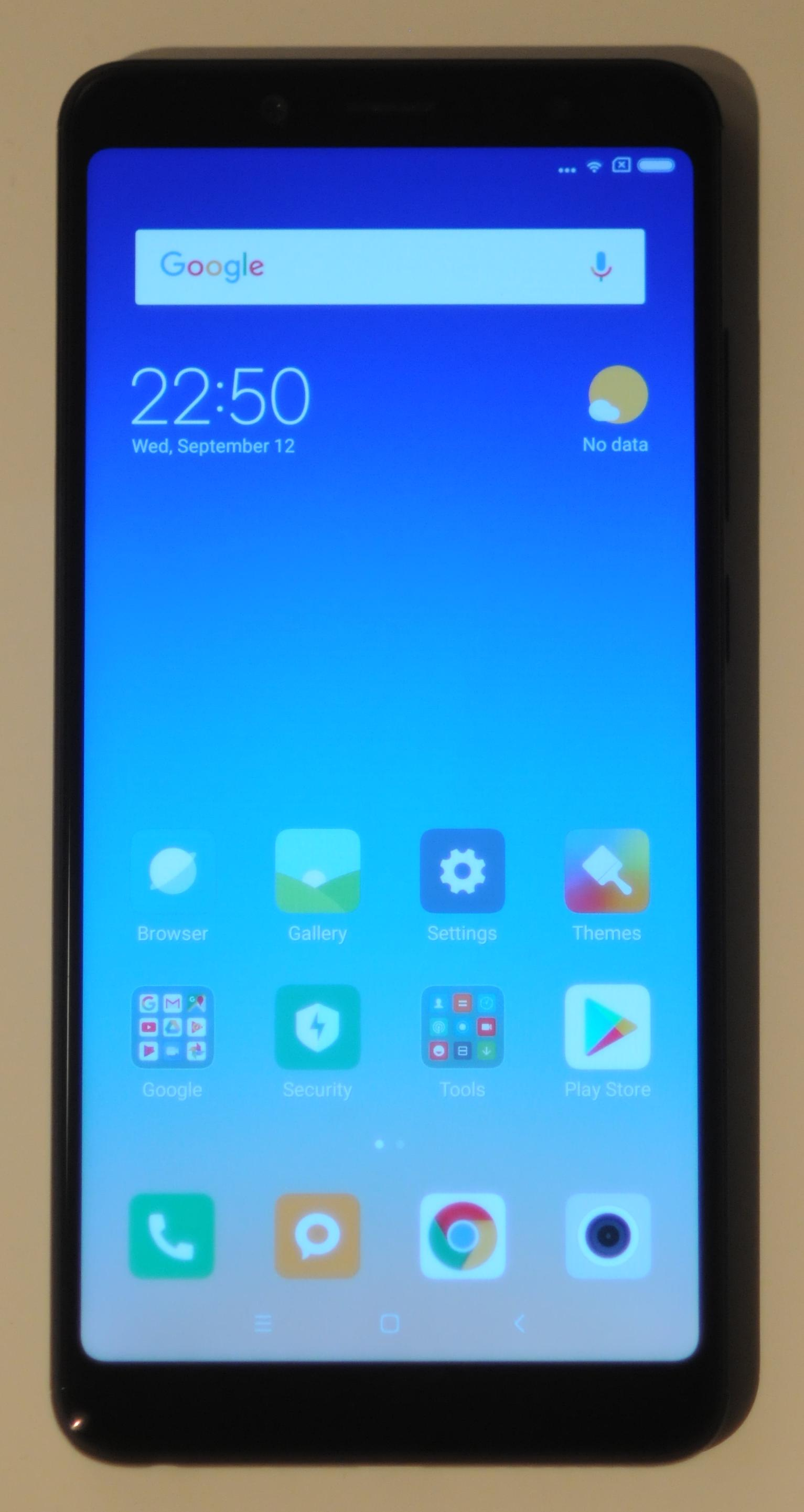
- Manufacturer: Xiaomi
- Type: Phablet
- Series: Redmi Note
- First released: February 2018; 8 years ago near EOL as of 2021
- Predecessor: Redmi Note 4
- Successor: Redmi Note 6 Pro; Redmi Note 7
- Related: Redmi 5
- Compatible networks: 2G, 3G, 4G, 4G LTE
- Form factor: Slate
- Dimensions: H: 158.6 mm (6.24 in); W: 75.4 mm (2.97 in); D: 8.1 mm (0.32 in); D max: 9.2 mm (0.36 in)(camera)
- Operating system: Original: Note 5: Android 8.1 "Oreo" with MIUI 9; Note 5 Pro: Android 7.1.2 "Nougat" with MIUI 9; Current: Note 5 (Global firmware)/Pro: Android 9 "Pie" with MIUI 12 / MIUI 11; Note 5 (Chinese firmware): Android 9 "Pie" with MIUI 12
- System-on-chip: Qualcomm Snapdragon 636 (downclocked SDM660)
- CPU: Octa-core (4x 1.8 GHz Performance Kryo 260 cores based on Cortex A73 + 4x 1.6 GHz efficiency Kryo 260 cores based on Cortex A53)
- GPU: Adreno 509
- Memory: Note 5: 3 or 4 GB RAM; Note 5 Pro: 4 or 6 GB LPDDR4X RAM
- Storage: Note 5: 32 GB or 64 GB; Note 5 Pro: 32 GB or 64
- Removable storage: microSDXC, expandable up to 2 TB (uses SIM 2 slot)
- Battery: Non-removable Li-Po 4000 mAh battery
- Rear camera: Note 5: Dual: Samsung 12 MP (f/1.9, 1.25 μm) Dual-PD + Samsung 5 MP (f/2.0, 1.12 μm); Note 5 Pro: Dual: Sony Exmor RS IMX486 12 MP (f/2.2, 1.25 μm) + Samsung S5K5E8 5 MP (f/2.0, 1.12 μm), phase detection autofocus, LED flash, Geo-tagging, touch focus, face detection, panorama, HDR
- Front camera: Note 5: OmniVision OV13855 13 MP 1.0 μm Note 5 Pro: Sony Exmor RS IMX376 20 MP (f/2.2, 1/2.8", 1.0 μm), LED flash, 1080p
- Display: 5.99 inches, 1080 x 2160 pixels, 18:9 ratio (403 ppi), IPS LCD capacitive touchscreen, 16M colors
- Connectivity: Wi-Fi 802.11a/b/g/n/ac (2.4 & 5 GHz), dual-band, WiFi Direct, hotspot Bluetooth V5, A2DP, Low-energy
- Codename: whyred
- Website: www.mi.com/in/redmi-note5/

Redmi Note 5 and Redmi Note 5 Pro are smartphones developed by Xiaomi Inc as a part of Xiaomi's mid-range Redmi Note smartphone series. The Redmi Note 5 Pro was announced on 14 February, 2018 in Delhi, India, alongside the local model of the Redmi Note 5 (known globally as the Redmi 5 Plus), while the global Redmi Note 5 was announced on 1 March, 2018. The main difference between the Redmi Note 5 and Redmi Note 5 Pro is camera.

== Design ==
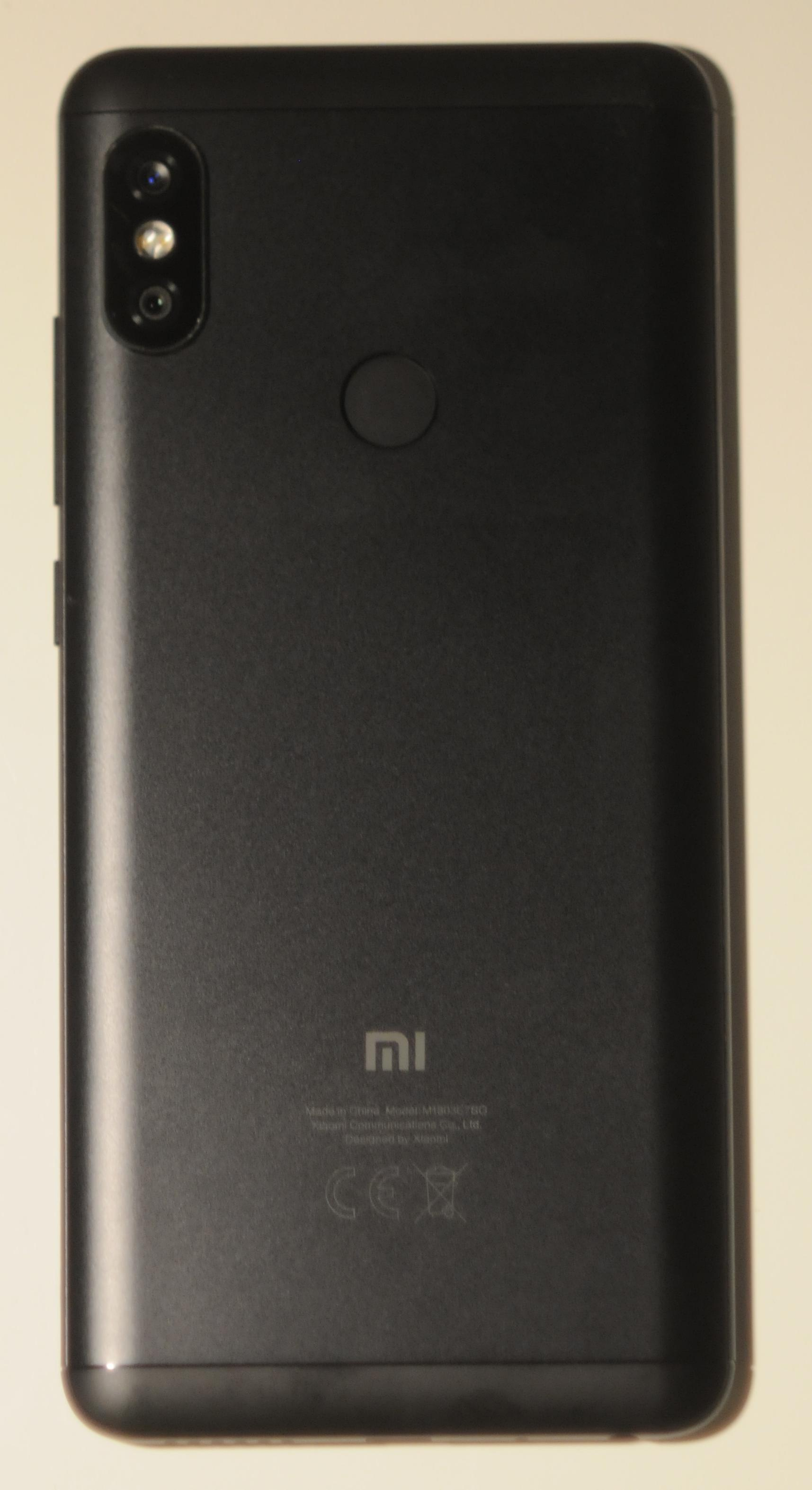
The back of the Redmi Note 5 in black

The front is made of Corning Gorilla Glass, while the casing is made of aluminum with plastic stripes on top and bottom.

On the bottom of the smartphones, the user can find a microUSB port, a speaker, a microphone and a 3.5mm audio jack. On the top side, there is an additional microphone and an IR blaster. On the left side, there is a hybrid dual SIM with one slot for a Nano-SIM card and second one for a Nano-SIM or a microSD card. On the right side, there is the volume rocker and the power button. On the back, there is the rear camera island with an LED flash, which is located, unlike its predecessors, at the top-left corner on a protruding camera bump that resembles the one present on the iPhone X, the logo, and a fingerprint reader.

Redmi Note 5 was available in 5 colors: Lake Blue, Rose Gold, Gold, Black, and Red. The most popular color was Lake Blue, which was an instant hit among the users. Red was the next best, which was introduced at a later date.

== Specifications ==
=== Hardware ===
The Redmi Note 5 Pro runs on the Qualcomm Snapdragon 636 processor. It is a downclocked version of the Snapdragon 660 processor. It is a 64-bit octa-core chipset utilizing Qualcomm's Kryo 260 architecture, featuring a cluster of 4x performance cores (Cortex-A73) clocked at 1.8 GHz and 4x efficiency cores (Cortex-A53) clocked at 1.6 GHz. It integrates the Qualcomm Adreno 509 GPU, providing improved graphical performance over its predecessor.

The smartphones come with a 5.99-inch IPS LCD display with an 18:9 aspect ratio, 1080×2160 resolution, and a pixel density of 403 ppi. The front panel features 2.5D curved glass and has a 77% screen-to-body ratio.

The main dual-camera setup features a 12 MP sensor + a 5 MP depth sensor used in portrait mode to have a bokeh effect in pictures. The 13-megapixel front-facing camera in the Redmi Note 5 and the 20 MP front facing camera in the Redmi Note 5 Pro feature a front LED flash rated for 4500K color temperatures as claimed by Xiaomi

Redmi Note 5 comes with 3 GB, 4 GB or 6 GB LPDDR4X RAM and 32 GB or 64 GB eMMC 5.1 storage.

=== Software ===
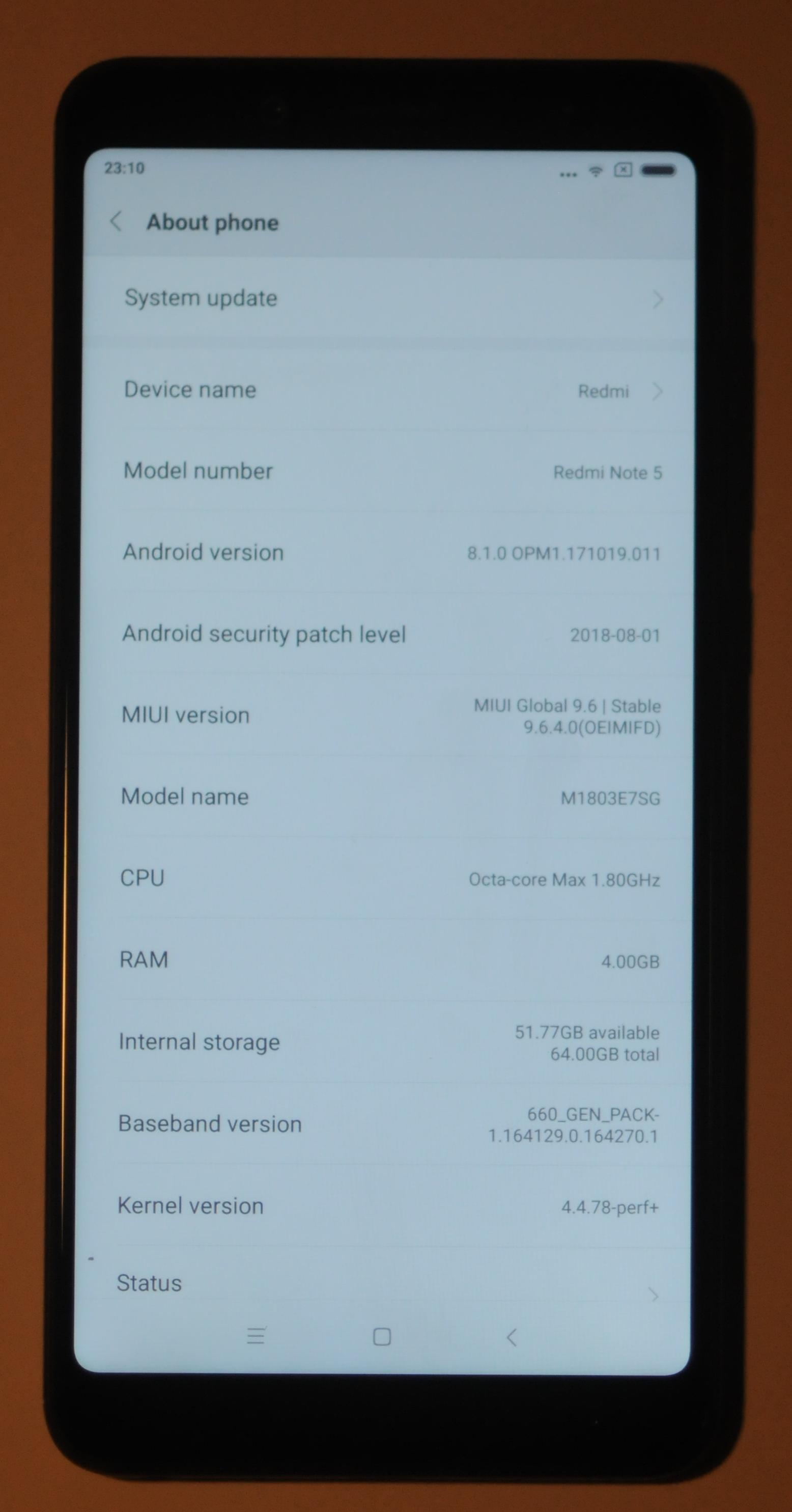
"About phone" menu on the Redmi Note 5

The Redmi Note 5 and Redmi Note 5 Pro were released with MIUI 9, but on the Redmi Note 5 Pro it is released with Android 7.1.2 "Nougat", while on the Redmi Note 5 it is released with Android 8.1 "Oreo". Later, the phones were updated to Android 9 "Pie", but the Redmi Note 5 Pro's last software update for the phone was Android 9 "Pie" with MIUI 12.

=== Features ===
The smartphones come with a fingerprint reader, accelerometer, gyroscope, proximity sensor, radio, and compass. The audio output includes background noise levels of -29.7 dB and crosstalk at -91.8 dB.

== Reception ==
Redmi Note 5 received mostly positive reviews. TechRadar called it the best budget smartphone in the market and rated it 4/5. However lack of NFC and USB type C port, as well as the camera bump and inclusion of advertisements in the UI has been criticized.

== Sales ==
On 22 February 2018, in the first sale of the phone, the Indian division of Xiaomi claimed to have sold more than 300,000 Redmi Note 5 (Redmi 5 Plus) and Redmi Note 5 Pro units in less than three minutes and called it the biggest sale in the Indian history of smartphones.
