= Redmi Note 7 =

Smart phone by Xiaomi/Redmi

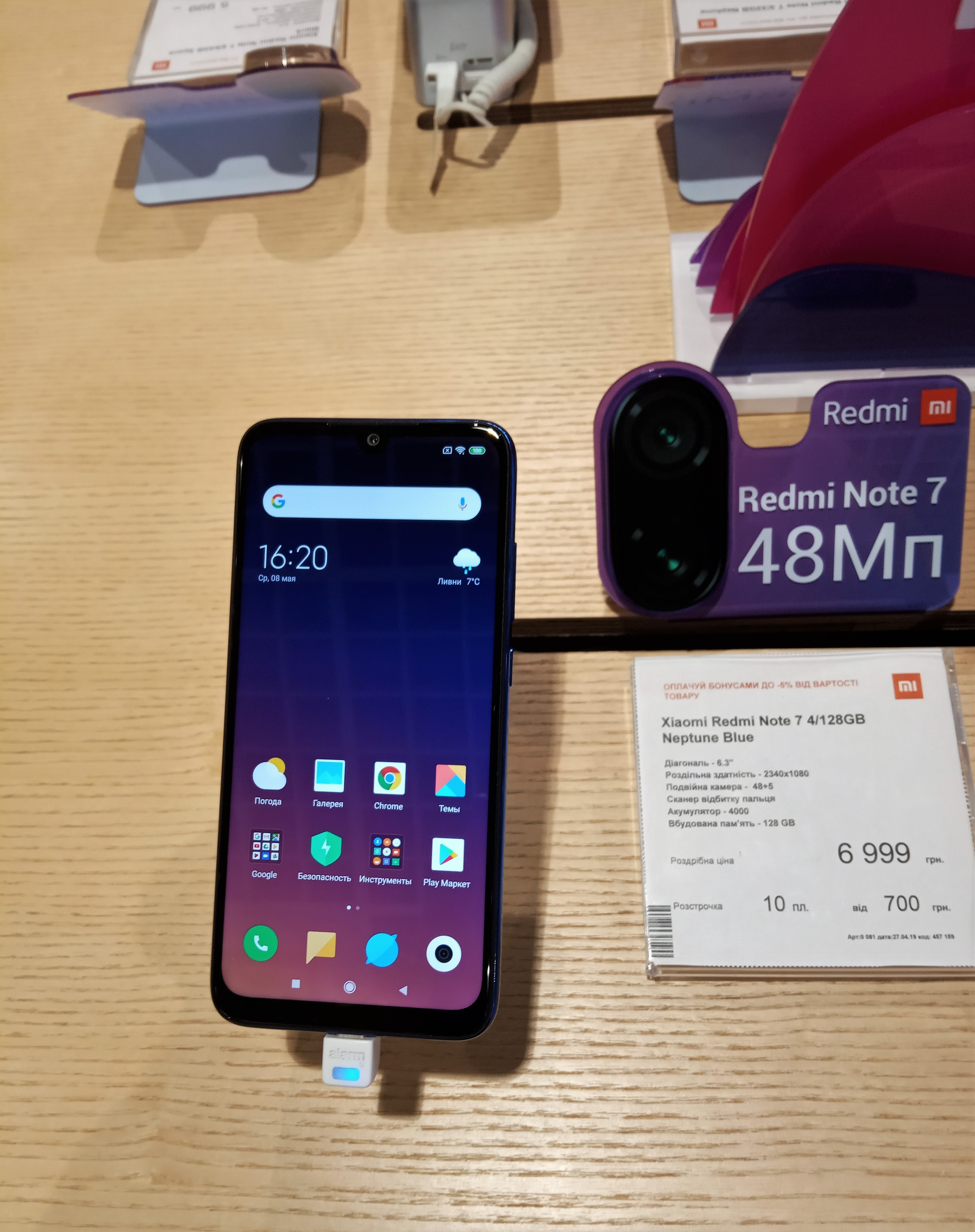
- Manufacturer: Redmi
- Type: Phablet
- Series: Redmi Note series
- First released: 28 February 2019; 7 years ago
- Predecessor: Redmi Note 5 Redmi Note 6 Pro
- Successor: Redmi Note 8
- Related: Redmi 7 Xiaomi Mi Play
- Compatible networks: See #Specifications
- Form factor: Slate
- Dimensions: H: 159.2 mm (6.27 in); W: 75.2 mm (2.96 in); D: 8.1 mm (0.32 in)
- Weight: 186 g (6.6 oz)
- Operating system: Original: MIUI 10 based on Android 9 "Pie"; Current: MIUI 12.5 based on Android 10
- System-on-chip: See #Specifications
- CPU: See #Specifications
- GPU: See #Specifications
- Memory: 3/4/6 GB LPDDR4X RAM
- Storage: 32/64/128 GB
- Removable storage: microSDXC, expandable up to 256 GB (uses SIM 2 slot)
- Battery: Non-removable Li-Po 4000mAh battery
- Rear camera: Dual: 48MP + 5MP See #Specifications, depth sensor, phase detection autofocus, LED flash, Geo-tagging, touch focus, face detection, panorama, HDR
- Front camera: 13 MP (f/2.0)
- Display: 6.3 inches, 2340 x 1080 pixels, 19.5:9 ratio (409 ppi), 450 nits brightness, 1500:1 contrast ratio, LCD capacitive touchscreen, 16M colors
- Connectivity: USB 2.0 Type-C; 3.5 mm headphone jack Wi-Fi 802.11a/b/g/n/ac, WiFi Direct, Wi-Fi Features: MU-MIMO, Dual-band simultaneous (DBS), Integrated baseband, LTE/Wi-Fi antenna sharing Bluetooth V5, A2DP, Low-energy
- Data inputs: Sensors: Accelerometer; Gyroscope; Fingerprint scanner (rear-mounted); Proximity sensor; Electronic compass; Ambient light sensor
- Codename: Redmi Note 7 & Redmi Note 7S: lavender Redmi Note 7 Pro: violet
- SAR: Head: 0.962 W/kg; Body: 0.838 W/kg (distance 15mm)
- Website: www.mi.com/global/redmi-note-7 www.mi.com/in/redmi-note-7-pro

The Redmi Note 7 series is the series of Android-based smartphones released by Redmi, a sub-brand of Xiaomi. All (except the Redmi Note 7 variant in India) have 48 MP + 5 MP camera sensors. Most have a Qualcomm Snapdragon 660 SoC, except the Redmi Note 7 Pro, which has a better Qualcomm Snapdragon 675 SoC. The phones support mobile network frequencies in different regions. The Note 7 is available in many local versions and a global version, compatible with mobile phone providers in most places; the Pro model is supplied in slightly different Chinese and Indian versions. The Redmi Note 7S doesn't have much difference when compared to Redmi Note 7 except for the rear camera, hence the production of the Redmi Note 7S was discontinued and came under the Redmi Note 7 in India, but remained available separately in China and other countries.

In August 2019 Xiaomi announced that the Redmi Note 7 series had sold more than 20 million units worldwide.

== Specifications ==
The Redmi Note 7 (lavender) was made in versions M1901F7C (for Hong Kong), 1901F7E (for China), 1901F7G (global), and 1901F7H (for Asia).

Specification of different Redmi Note 7 variants
	Redmi Note 7			Redmi Note 7S	Redmi Note 7 Pro	
	India Version	China Version	Global Version	Redmi Note 7S	India Version	China Version
SoC	Qualcomm Snapdragon 660				Qualcomm Snapdragon 675	
CPU	Octa-core 4 + 4 cores (4x 2.2 GHz Kryo 260 Gold – Cortex-A73 derivative) (4x 1.8 GHz Kryo 260 Silver – Cortex-A53 derivative)				Octa-core 2 + 6 cores (2x 2.0 GHz Kryo 460 Gold – Cortex-A76 derivative) (6x 1.7 GHz Kryo 460 Silver – Cortex-A55 derivative)	
GPU	650 MHz Adreno 512				845 MHz Adreno 612	
Back main camera	12 MP 1.25μm Sony Exmor RS IMX486 f/2.2	48 MP 0.8μm Samsung ISOCELL GM1 f/1.8			48 MP 0.8μm Sony Exmor RS IMX586 f/1.8	
Back secondary camera	2 MP	5 MP 1.12μm Samsung S5K5E8 f/2.4				
Front camera	13 MP (f/2.0)					
Storage options	3+32 GB/ 4+64 GB	3+32 GB/ 4+64 GB/ 6+64 GB; offline only: 4+128 GB	3+32 GB/ 4+64 GB/ 4+128 GB	3+32 GB/ 4+64 GB	4+64 GB/ 6+128 GB	6+128 GB
Storage options	RAM: Dual channel LPDDR4x, ROM: eMMC 5.1					
Screen	6.3" 19.5:9 (409 ppi) "dot notch" 2340x1080 FHD+ LCD; 450 cd/m^{2} 1500:1 CR					
Battery	4000 mAh non-removable					
Fast Charge	3A	Quick Charge 4				
Cellular network: GSM	Band 2/3/5/8					
Cellular network: WCDMA	Band 1/2/5/8		Band 1/2/4/5/8	Band 1/2/5/8		
Cellular network: CDMA	—N/a	BC0	—N/a			BC0
Cellular network: TD-SCDMA	—N/a	Band 34/39	—N/a			Band 34/39
Cellular network: LTE-FDD	Band 1/3/5/8	Band 1/3/5/7/8	Band 1/2/3/4/5/7/8/20(/28)	Band 1/3/5/8		Band 1/3/5/7/8
Cellular network: LTE-TDD	Band 40/41	Band 34/38/39/40/41; 100 MHz	Band 38/40	Band 40/41; 120 MHz		Band 34/38/39/40/41; 100 MHz
Wi-Fi	2.4/5 GHz IEEE 802.11a/b/g/n/ac					
Radio	?		FM	?		FM
Bluetooth	Bluetooth 5.0					
Infrared	Yes					
VoLTE	Yes					
Audio	3.5 mm jack					
USB	Type C					
Navigation	GPS, A-GPS, GLONASS, BeiDou					
Expansion card	Dual sim DSDS 3-choose-2 4G+4G hybrid card tray; expandable storage with Micro SD card up to 256 GB					
Water resistance	?			P2i nano-coating splash resistant		
Dimension	159.21 mm x 75.21 mm x 8.1 mm					
Weight	185 g	186 g				
Software	MIUI 10; Android 9; MIUI 11; Android 9 (updated to MIUI 12, Android 9, Android 10); MIUI 12.5					

=== Design ===
The Redmi Note 7 and Note 7 Pro have a shiny glass back with a gradient that Xiaomi calls "Aura Design". Both the front and back of the device have 2.5D curved Gorilla Glass 5. The phone also has a P2i nano-coating that makes it splash resistant, but does not have an IP Code. In other markets such as India, available color variants include Nebula Red, Space Black, and Neptune Blue.

The Redmi Note 7 and Note 7 Pro have a dot notch in the display to accommodate the front-facing camera.

=== Software ===
The Redmi Note 7 and Pro originally ran on Xiaomi's MIUI version 10, based on Android Pie (9), with minor version updates from time to time, and were ultimately updated to Android 10 and MIUI 12.5.

=== Hardware ===
The Redmi Note 7 (lavender) and Note 7 Pro (violet), both have a 6.3-inch full HD+ (2340×1080 pixels) display with a 19.5:9 aspect ratio. The Redmi Note 7 is powered by a 14 nm octa-core Snapdragon 660 SoC while the Note 7 Pro is the first Xiaomi device to use the Snapdragon 675 SoC. The RN7 has an Adreno 512 GPU (612 for the Pro variant) and a 4000 mAh battery and supports Quick Charge 4. Various versions are fitted with 3, 4, or 6 GB of RAM, with 32, 64, or 128 GB of storage; a micro SD card of up to 256 GB is supported via a hybrid SIM card slot. The Pro version's camera has a Sony IMX586 sensor with f/1.8 aperture, slightly better than the RN7's similarly specified Samsung ISOCELL GM1 sensor; both have a secondary 5-megapixel depth sensor. The front camera has a resolution of 13 megapixels. The rear camera can record 4K video at 30 fps.

The RN7 Pro has a studio lighting mode live option, showing what the studio lighting effect will look like.

The phone has AI scene detection capable of recognizing up to 12 scenes, AI Portrait 2.0 and a Night Mode.

=== Connectivity ===
The Redmi Note 7 (and Note 7 Pro) supports Wi-Fi 802.11 a/b/g/n/ac, satellite navigation, Bluetooth v5.0, USB OTG, USB Type-C, 3G and 4G networks (with support for Band 40 used by some LTE networks in India), VoLTE and VoWiFi.

=== Other features ===
The phone has a gyroscope, proximity sensor, and fingerprint sensor. It has two nano-SIM slots, one of which is a hybrid for SIM or microSD card.

The phones support FM radio with recording, USB type-C connector, and face unlock, and have a small LED indicator. An IR blaster which can emulate an infrared remote control, and a 3.5 mm headphone jack are fitted.

== Release ==
The Chinese version of Redmi Note 7 was launched in Beijing on 15 January 2019.

The Indian versions of Redmi Note 7 and Redmi Note 7 Pro were launched together in New Delhi, India on 28 February 2019.

The Global version of Redmi Note 7 was launched on 6 March 2019.

The Chinese version of Redmi Note 7 Pro was launched on 18 March 2019.

There will not be a global version of the Redmi Note 7 Pro.

The Indian version of Redmi Note 7S was launched on 20 May 2019.

== Rear camera images ==
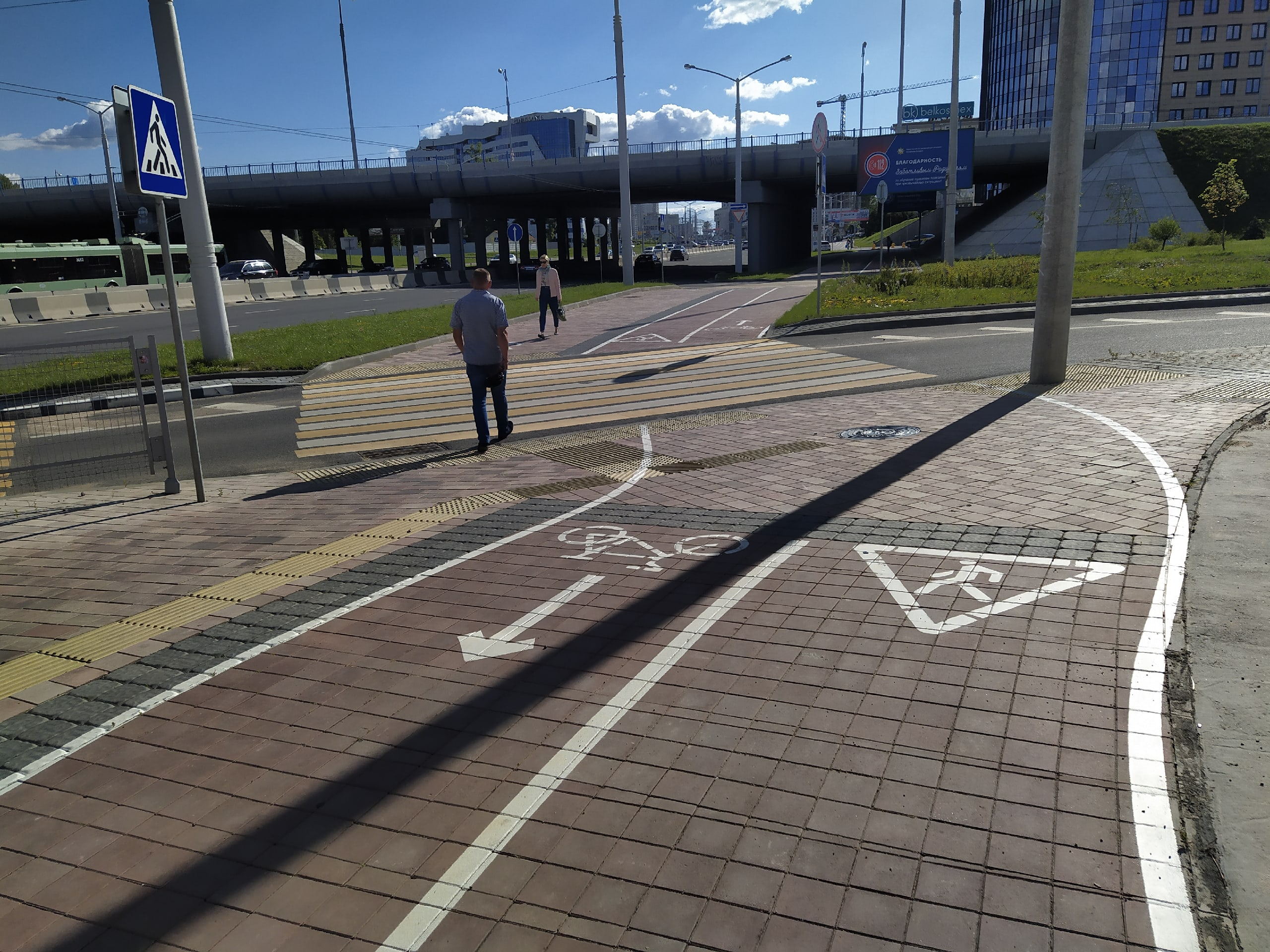
Sample 1

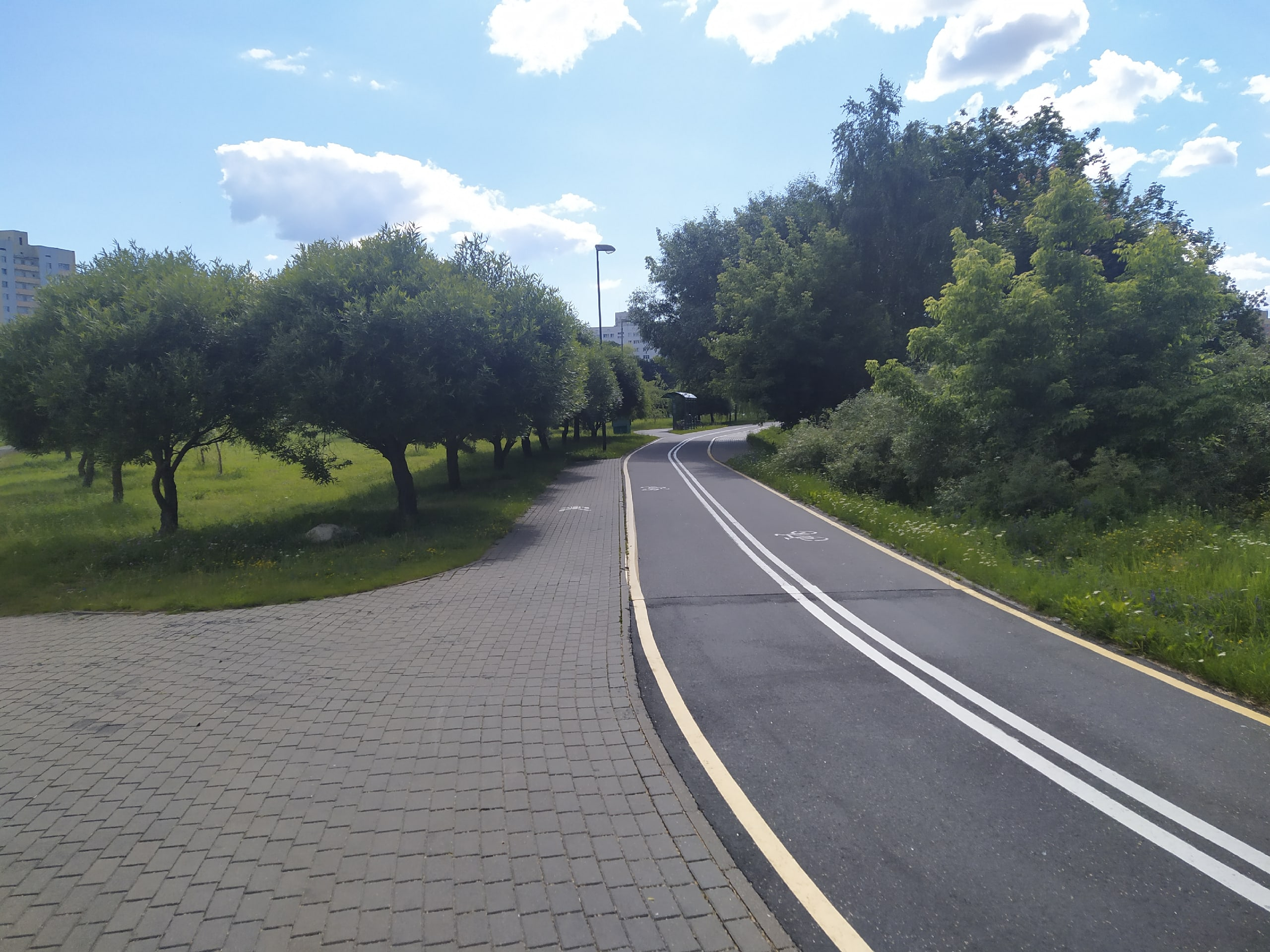
Sample 2

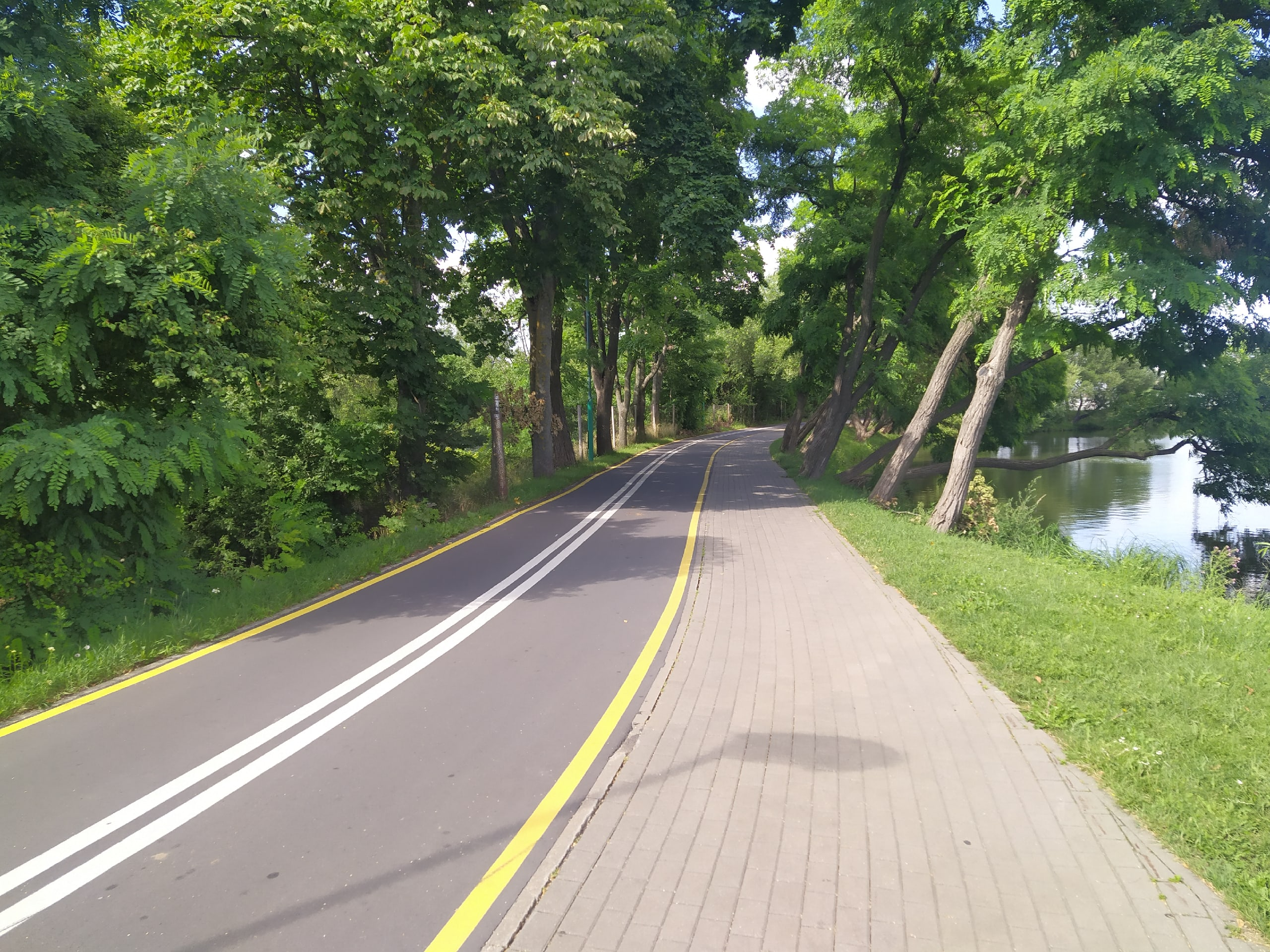
Sample 3

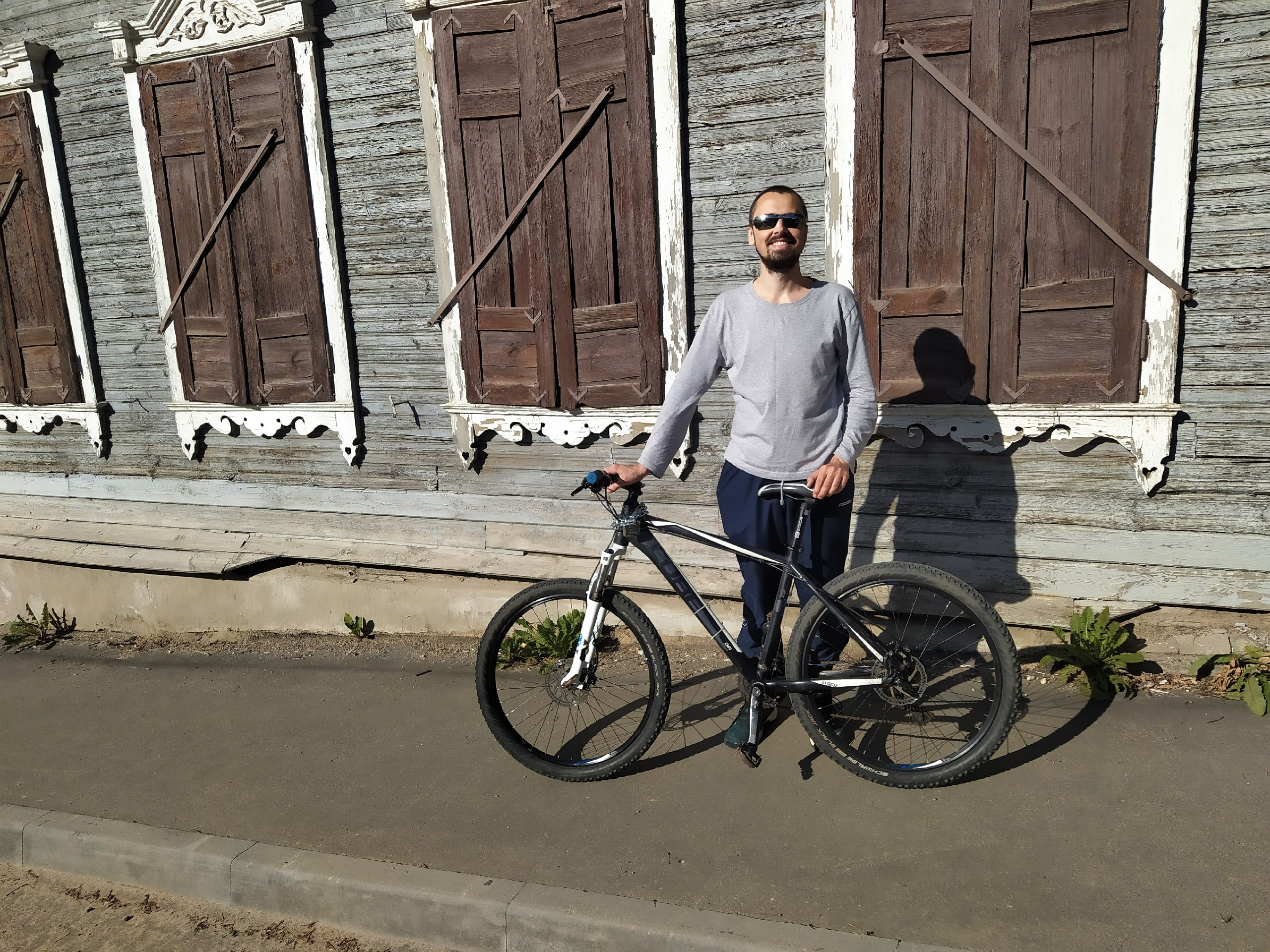
Sample 4

Video sample
