= Xiaomi Mi 8 =

2018 Android smartphone by Xiaomi

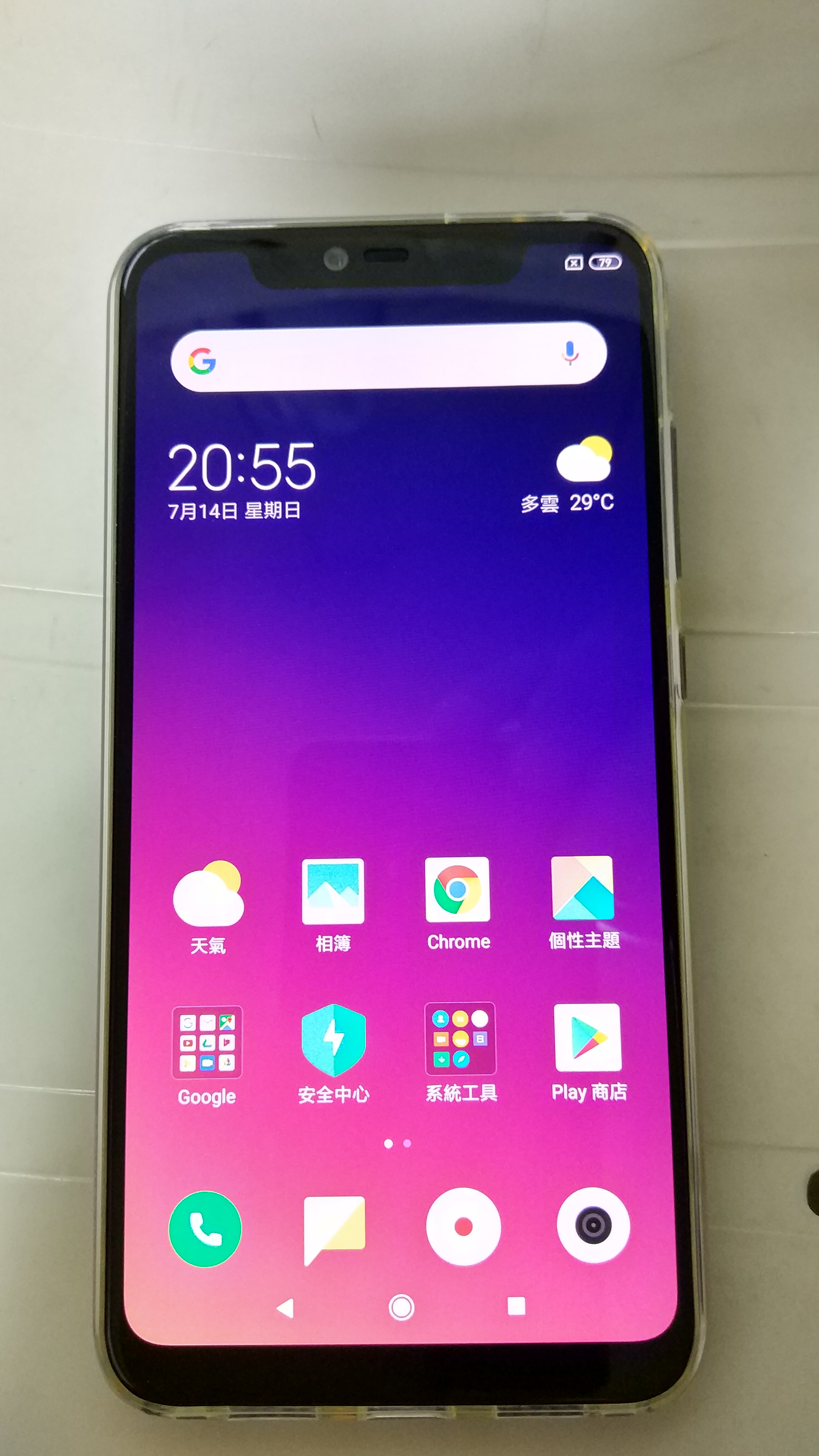
- Manufacturer: Xiaomi
- Type: Touchscreen smartphone
- Series: Mi
- First released: May 2018; 8 years ago
- Units sold: 1 million (as of June 23, 2018)
- Predecessor: Xiaomi Mi 6
- Successor: Xiaomi Mi 9
- Related: Pocophone F1
- Form factor: Slate
- Dimensions: 154.9 mm (6.10 in) H; 74.8 mm (2.94 in) W; 7.6 mm (0.30 in) D
- Weight: 175 g (6.2 oz)
- Operating system: MIUI 12 based on Android 10
- System-on-chip: Qualcomm SDM845 Snapdragon 845
- CPU: Octa-core (4x 2.8 GHz Performance Kryo 385 Gold cores + 4x 1.8 GHz efficiency Kryo 385 Silver cores)
- GPU: Adreno 630
- Memory: 6 GB LPDDR4X RAM
- Storage: 64 GB/128 GB
- Battery: Non-removable Li-Po 3400 mAh battery
- Rear camera: Dual: 12 MP (f/1.8, 1/2.55", 1.4 μm, 4-axis OIS, dual-pixel PDAF) + 12 MP (f/2.4, 1/3.4", 1.0 μm), 2x optical zoom, dual pixel phase detection autofocus, dual-LED flash
- Front camera: 20 MP (f/2.0, 1.8 μm), 1080p
- Display: 6.21 inches, 1080 x 2248 pixels, (402 ppi), SUPER AMOLED touchscreen, 16M colors HDR10; DCI-P3
- Connectivity: 2G, 3G, 4G, 4G LTE, Wi-Fi 802.11a/b/g/n/ac (2.4 & 5GHz), dual-band, WiFi Direct, DLNA, hotspot Bluetooth V5, A2DP, Low-energy, aptX HD
- Data inputs: Dual band GNSS (GPS/GLONASS/BeiDou/Galileo)
- Codename: dipper

The Xiaomi Mi 8 is a flagship Android smartphone developed by Xiaomi Inc. It was launched at an event held in Shenzhen, China as the successor to the Xiaomi Mi 6. The naming of the Xiaomi Mi 8 (skipping the Mi 7) is in celebration of Xiaomi Inc's eighth anniversary. The Mi 8 draws parallels to the iPhone X, as both the rear and front of the phone are replicated. This design was later carried on to the mid-range Redmi Note 6 Pro and Mi A2 Lite.

== Specifications ==
=== Hardware ===
The Xiaomi Mi 8 is powered by the Qualcomm Snapdragon 845 processor, with 6 GB LPDDR4X RAM and Adreno 630 GPU. It has a 6.21-inch (158 mm) FullHD plus AMOLED display. Storage options include 64 GB or 128 GB. The handset features a fingerprint scanner on the rear or on the screen under the display, in the Explorer Edition. It features a 3,400 mAh battery with a USB-C reversible connector which supports Quick Charge 4.0+. It has Gorilla Glass 5. It does not feature a 3.5mm headphone jack and comes with a USB-C to 3.5mm headphone jack adapter provided in the box. The Mi 8 includes a dual camera setup with a 12 MP wide angle lens sensor and a 12 MP telephoto lens sensor. The front camera has a 20 MP sensor with an aperture of f/2.0. The Mi 8 camera has an overall score of 99 and a photo score of 105 on DxOMark. Explorer Edition also introduces a 3D optical facial recognition with the standard IR sensor for dark conditions and a dual band GNSS which allows reception of L1 and L5 signals simultaneously.

=== Software ===
It runs on Android 10, with Xiaomi's custom MIUI 11 skin which is upgradeable to MIUI 12.
