= Vivo V20 =

Series of Android smartphones manufactured by Vivo

Vivo V20 Vivo V20 Pro (Vivo S7 in China) Vivo V20 SE Vivo Y70 Vivo V20 2021 Vivo S7t

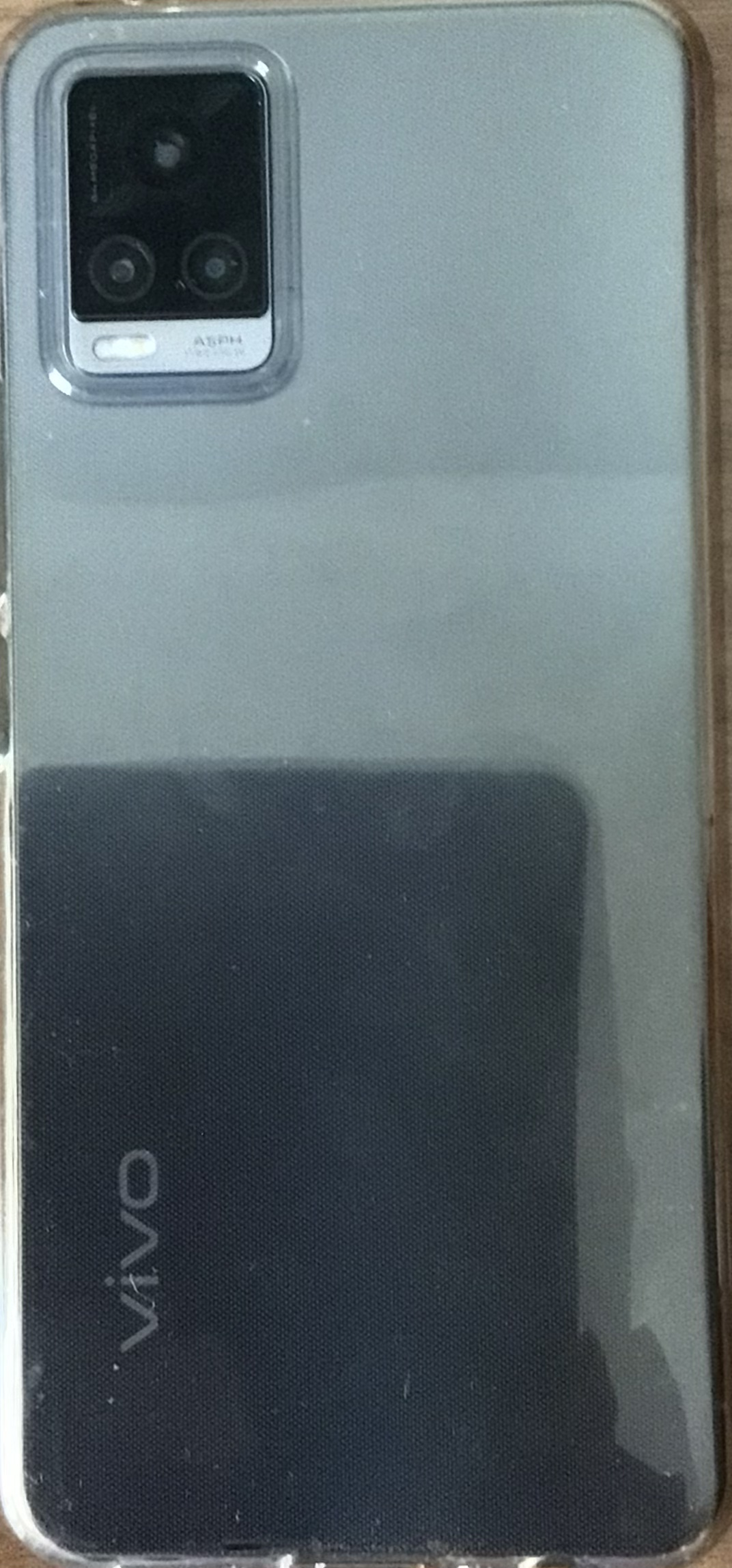
- Vivo V20 in a silicone case
- Brand: vivo
- Manufacturer: vivo
- Type: Phablet
- Series: Vivo V/Y/S
- First released: S7: August 3, 2020; 6 years ago V20 Pro: September 22, 2020; 6 years ago V20 SE: September 24, 2020; 5 years ago V20: September 30, 2020; 5 years ago Y70: October 19, 2020; 5 years ago
- Predecessor: Vivo V19; Vivo S6
- Successor: Vivo V21; Vivo S9
- Related: Vivo Y70s; Vivo S7e
- Compatible networks: GSM, 3G, 4G (LTE), 5G (V20 Pro & S7t)
- Form factor: Slate
- Dimensions: V20 & 20 2021: 161.3 × 74.2 × 7.4 mm V20 Pro & S7t: 158.8 × 74.2 × 7.4 mm V20 SE & Y70: 161 × 74.1 × 7.8 mm
- Weight: V20 & 20 SE & 20 2021: 171 g V20 Pro: 170 g S7t: 169 g
- Operating system: Original: V20 & 2021: Android 11 + FuntouchOS 11; V20 Pro & 20 SE & Y70: Android 10 + FuntouchOS 11; S7t: Android 11 + OriginOS 1.0; Current: V20 & 2021 & 20 Pro & 20 SE & Y70: Android 11 + FuntouchOS 11; S7t: Android 11 + OriginOS 1.0
- CPU: V20: Qualcomm SDM7125 Snapdragon 720G (8 nm), 8 cores (1×2.4 GHz Kryo 475 Prime & 1×2.2 GHz Kryo 475 Gold & 6×1.8 GHz Kryo 475 Silver); V20 Pro: Qualcomm SDM765 Snapdragon 765G (7 nm), 8 cores (2×2.3 GHz Kryo 465 Gold & 6×1.8 GHz Kryo 465 Silver); V20 SE: Qualcomm SDM665 Snapdragon 665 (11 nm), 8 cores (4×2.0 GHz Kryo 260 Gold & 4×1.8 GHz Kryo 260 Silver); V20 2021: Qualcomm SDM730 Snapdragon 730G (8 nm), 8 cores (2×2.2 GHz Kryo 470 Gold & 6×1.8 GHz Kryo 470 Silver); S7t: MediaTek MT6875 Dimensity 820 5G (7 nm), 8 cores (4×2.6 GHz Cortex-A76 & 4×2.0 GHz Cortex-A55)
- Removable storage: V20 & 20 2021: MicroSDXC up to 2 TB; V20 Pro: None; V20 SE & Y70: MicroSDXC up to 1 TB
- Battery: All models: Non-removable, Li-Po; V20 & 20 Pro & 20 2021 & S7t: 4000 mAh; V20 SE: 4100 mAh
- Charging: 33 W fast charging
- Rear camera: V20 & 20 Pro & 20 2021 & S7t: 64 MP, f/1.9, 26 mm (wide), 1/7.2", 0.8 µm, PDAF + 8 MP, f/2.2, 120˚, 16 mm (ultrawide), 1/4.0", 1.12 µm, AF (V20) + 2 MP, f/2.4 (depth sensor); V20 SE: 48 MP, f/1.8, 25 mm (wide), 1/2.0", 0.8 µm, PDAF + 8 MP, f/2.2, 16 mm (ultrawide), 1/4.0", 1.12 µm, AF + 2 MP, f/2.4 (depth sensor); Y70: 48 MP, f/1.8, 25 mm (wide), 1/2.0", 0.8 µm, PDAF + 2 MP, f/2.4 (macro) + 2 MP, f/2.4 (depth sensor); 2-LED dual-tone flash, HDR, panorama Video: 4K@30fps, 1080p@30/60fps (V20), gyro-EIS (except V20 SE and Y70)
- Front camera: V20 & 20 2021: 44 MP, f/2.0 (wide), AF; V20 Pro & S7t: 44 MP, f/2.0 (wide) + 8 MP, f/2.3 (ultrawide), 1/4.0", 1.12 µm V20 SE: 32 MP, f/2.0 (wide), 1/2.8", 0.8 µm HDR; Video: 4K@30fps (V20 Pro & S7t), 1080p@30fps, gyro-EIS (except V20 SE)
- Display: AMOLED, 6.44", 2400 × 1080 (FullHD+), 20:9, 409 ppi, HDR10 (except V20 SE)
- Data inputs: USB-C 2.0, 3.5 mm Audio (except V20 Pro and S7t), Bluetooth 5.0/5.1 (V20 & S7 & S7t) (A2DP, LE), NFC (except V20 Pro), Wi-Fi 802.11 a/b/g/n/ac (dual-band, Wi-Fi Direct, hotspot), GPS, A-GPS, GLONASS, BDS, Galileo
- Other: Fingerprint scanner (under display, optical), proximity sensor, accelerometer, gyroscope, compass

The Vivo V20, V20 Pro, and V20 SE are series of mid-range Android smartphones developed and manufactured by Vivo. The Vivo V20 Pro was introduced on September 22, 2020, the V20 SE on September 24, 2020, and the standard V20 on September 30. Additionally, on December 24, 2020, the Vivo V20 2021, a variation of the Vivo V20 with an improved processor, was introduced in India.

== Availability ==
In some countries, the Vivo Y70 model is sold, which is similar to the V20 SE, except for its simplified cameras.

In China, the Vivo V20 Pro is sold under the name Vivo S7, and unlike the V20 Pro, it features an NFC module.

On February 4, 2021, the Vivo S7t was introduced, which differs from the Vivo S7 in its processor.

In Ukraine, only the Vivo V20 and V20 SE are officially sold, having been introduced on October 30, 2020.

The Vivo V20 became the first smartphone with Android 11 out of the box to be officially sold in Ukraine.

== Design and technical specifications ==
=== Design ===
The screen is made of glass. The back panel of the V20 and V20 Pro is made of glass, while the V20 SE's is made of plastic. The side frame of all models is made of plastic.

On the bottom of the V20 Pro and S7t are a USB-C connector, a speaker, a microphone, and a slot for two SIM cards. All other models have a USB-C connector, a speaker, a microphone, and a 3.5 mm audio jack on the bottom. A second microphone is located on the top. The V20 SE also has a slot on top for two SIM cards and a MicroSD memory card up to 1 TB. On the left side of the V20 is a slot for two SIM cards and a MicroSD memory card up to 2 TB. The volume control buttons and the smartphone lock button are located on the right side.

The Vivo V20, V20 Pro, V20 2021, and S7t are sold in 3 colors: Midnight Jazz (black), Sunset Melody (blue-orange), and Moonlight Sonata (white). In Ukraine, the V20 is only available in Midnight Jazz and Sunset Melody.

In Ukraine, the Vivo V20 SE is sold in 2 colors: Gravity Black and Soft Blue.

=== Hardware ===
The configuration of processors (chipset, CPU, GPU) differ from the following models:

- The Vivo V20 is powered by the Qualcomm Snapdragon 720G processor and an the Adreno 618 GPU.
- The Vivo V20 2021 is powered by the Qualcomm Snapdragon 730G processor and the Adreno 618 GPU.
- The Vivo V20 Pro is powered by the Qualcomm Snapdragon 765G processor and the Adreno 620 GPU.
- The Vivo V20 SE and Y70 are powered by the Qualcomm Snapdragon 665 processor and the Adreno 610 GPU.
- The Vivo S7t is powered by the MediaTek Dimensity 820 5G processor and the Mali-G57 MC5 GPU.

The V20 (standard), V20 Pro, V20 2021, and S7t have a 4000 mAh battery, while the V20 SE and Y70 have a higher battery capacity, which is 4100 mAh. All of these smartphones are supported with fast charging up to 33W with the FlashCharge support.

== Camera ==
=== Main camera ===
The main camera array differs from the following models:

- The V20, V20 Pro, V20 2021, and S7t feature a 64 MP triple main camera with f/1.9 (wide-angle) and phase detection autofocus, an 8 MP f/2.2 (ultrawide) lens, and a 2 MP f/2.4 (depth sensor).
- The V20 SE features a 48 MP triple main camera with f/1.8 (wide-angle) and phase detection autofocus, an 8 MP f/2.2 (ultrawide) lens, and a 2 MP f/2.4 (depth sensor).
- The Y70 features a 48 MP triple main camera with f/1.8 (wide-angle), a 2 MP f/2.4 (macro) lens, and a 2 MP f/2.4 (depth sensor) with phase detection autofocus.

All models can record video in 4K@30fps resolution.

=== Front camera ===
The front camera array differs from the following models:

- The V20 and V20 2021 feature a 44 MP f/2.0 (wide-angle) front camera.
- The V20 Pro and S7t feature a dual front camera with 44 MP f/2.0 (wide-angle) and an 8 MP f/2.3 (ultrawide) lens.
- The V20 SE features a 32 MP f/2.0 (wide-angle) front camera.
- The Y70 features a 16 MP f/2.0 (wide-angle) front camera.

All models can record video in 1080p@30fps resolution.

== Reception ==
Ben Sin form Forbes noticed more details on the front camera than the iPhone 11 Pro's and Samsung Galaxy S20 FE's, nonimating as "the best phone for selfies".

In the "Sunset Melody" multiple-tone color, the Vivo Y20 is well-known for being endorsed by Blackpink member Lisa Manoban in China.
