= Xiaomi Mi Max 2 =

Android smartphone model

- Manufacturer: Xiaomi
- Type: Phablet
- Series: Mi Max
- First released: May 25, 2017; 9 years ago
- Predecessor: Xiaomi Mi Max
- Successor: Xiaomi Mi Max 3
- Compatible networks: GSM, 3G, 4G (LTE)
- Form factor: Slate
- Colors: Black, Silver, Gold
- Dimensions: 174.1×88.7×7.6 mm (6.85×3.49×0.30 in)
- Weight: 211 g (7 oz)
- Operating system: Initial: Android 7.1.2 Nougat + MIUI 8 Current: Android 7.1.2 Nougat + MIUI 11
- System-on-chip: Qualcomm MSM8953 Snapdragon 625 (14 nm)
- CPU: Octa-core 2.0 GHz Cortex-A53
- GPU: Adreno 506
- Memory: 4 GB LPDDR3
- Storage: 32/64/128 GB eMMC 5.1
- Removable storage: MicroSDXC up to 128 GB
- SIM: Hybrid Dual SIM (Nano-SIM)
- Battery: Non-removable Li-Ion 5300 mAh
- Charging: 18 W fast charging Quick Charge 3.0
- Rear camera: 12 MP Sony IMX386, f/2.2, 27 mm (wide), 1/2.9", 1.25 µm, PDAF, ISO 100 - 3200; 2-LED dual-tone flash, HDR, panorama Video: 4K@30fps, 720p@120fps
- Front camera: 5 MP Samsung S5K5E8, f/2.0, 85° (wide), 1.12 µm Video: 1080p@30fps
- Display: IPS LCD, 6.44", 1920 × 1080 (FHD), 16:9, 342 ppi
- Model: MDE40, MDI40, MDT40

The Xiaomi Mi Max 2 is a smartphone developed by Xiaomi, belonging to the Mi Max phablet series. It was officially unveiled on May 25, 2017, in Beijing.

The Mi Max 2 was officially launched in the Chinese market on June 1, 2017. At release, the device was available in two storage configurations: the base model featuring 64 GB of internal storage was priced at approximately US$247, while the higher-tier variant equipped with 128 GB of storage was retailed for around US$290. On June 18 at that year, the Mi Max 2 was announced in India until its release on July 27.

== Design ==
The front panel of the device is made of glass, while the unibody chassis is constructed from aluminum.

The Xiaomi Mi Max 2 is characterized by its exceptionally large form factor, positioning it within the "phablet" classification of mobile devices.

The bottom edge houses the USB-C port along with the main speaker and microphone grilles. The top edge contains the 3.5 mm audio jack, a secondary noise-canceling microphone, and an IR blaster. The left side features a hybrid tray with one slot for a Nano-SIM card and a second slot that can accommodate either a second SIM card or a MicroSD card up to 128 GB. The right side holds the volume rocker and power button. The fingerprint scanner is positioned on the rear panel.

The Xiaomi Mi Max 2 was sold in three color configurations: Black, Silver, and Gold.

== Specifications ==
=== Hardware ===
The Mi Max 2 is powered by the mid-range Qualcomm Snapdragon 625 system-on-chip paired with an Adreno 506 GPU. The device comes equipped with 4 GB of LPDDR3 RAM and is available with either 32 GB, 64 GB, or 128 GB of eMMC 5.1 internal storage.

It features a large 5300 mAh internal battery that supports 18 W fast charging via Quick Charge 3.0.

The smartphone sports a 6.44-inch IPS LCD display with a Full HD resolution of 1920 × 1080, a traditional 16:9 aspect ratio, and a pixel density of 342 ppi.

For audio, the device is equipped with stereo speakers, utilizing the earpiece speaker as the second audio channel.

The rear camera setup includes a 12 MP Sony IMX386 wide-angle lens with an aperture of f/2.2 and phase-detection autofocus (PDAF), capable of recording video at up to 4K at 30fps. The front-facing camera features a 5 MP sensor with an aperture of f/2.0 and supports video recording up to 1080p at 30fps.

=== Software ===
The Mi Max 2 was originally released running MIUI 8 based on Android 7.1.2 Nougat and was subsequently updated up to MIUI 11.
