= Redmi Note Prime =

Smartphone

Xiaomi Redmi Note Prime (Redmi Note 1S 4G in China)
- Manufacturer: Xiaomi
- Type: Smartphone
- Series: Redmi
- First released: December 2015; 10 years ago
- Predecessor: Redmi Note 4G
- Compatible networks: GSM: 850/900/1800MHz; WCDMA: 900/1900/2100MHz; 4G TDD-LTE: B40 / B41: 2555-2655MHz; 4G FDD-LTE: B1 / B3
- Form factor: Slate
- Dimensions: 154 mm (6.1 in) H 78.7 mm (3.10 in) W 9.45 mm (0.372 in) D
- Weight: 185 g (6.5 oz)
- Operating system: Android 4.4.4 Kitkat with MIUI 9
- System-on-chip: 1.2 GHz Qualcomm Snapdragon 410
- CPU: Quad Core 1.2 GHz
- GPU: Adreno 306 GPU
- Memory: 2 GB
- Storage: 16 GB
- Removable storage: Supports up to 32 GB microSD
- Battery: 3,100 mAh, internal rechargeable Li-Po
- Rear camera: 13 Megapixel auto-focus with LED flash
- Display: 5.5 in (140 mm) IPS LCD; 1280×720 px
- Connectivity: GPS / GLONASS, Wi-Fi 802.11 b/g/n, Bluetooth 4.0, Micro-USB
- Data inputs: Multi-touch capacitive touchscreen; Accelerometer; Dual SIM; A-GPS; Digital compass; Proximity sensor; Push buttons; capacitive touch-sensitive buttons
- Website: www.mi.com/in/noteprime/

The Xiaomi Redmi Note Prime is a smartphone released in December 2015 in India, developed by the Chinese company Xiaomi Inc. It is a part of the Redmi Note series of smartphones, and succeeded the Redmi Note 4G. Visually similar to its predecessor, it comes with a 5.5-inch screen, a quad-core 1.2 GHz Qualcomm Snapdragon 410 processor and runs MIUI 7 based on Android 4.4, which can be upgraded to MIUI 9 based on.

== Features ==
The Redmi Note Prime has a 5.5-inch HD 720p IPS display, supporting 16 million colors. The device is powered by Qualcomm® Snapdragon 410 processor and equipped with 2 GB RAM and 16 GB internal storage expandable by microSD slot up to 64 GB. The device also supports LTE-4G Dual SIM with Dual standby. Other features include a microphone, GPS, an 13 MP rear camera with auto-focus and LED flash, a 5 MP front camera. The battery is 3100 mAh, which provides 775 hours of standby. The rear camera is capable of recording videos at 1080p resolution, while the front camera supports 720p resolution recording.

== See also ==
- List of Android smartphones
- MIUI
