= Redmi Note 4 =

2016 and 2017 Android smartphones developed by Xiaomi

Xiaomi Redmi Note 4/4X

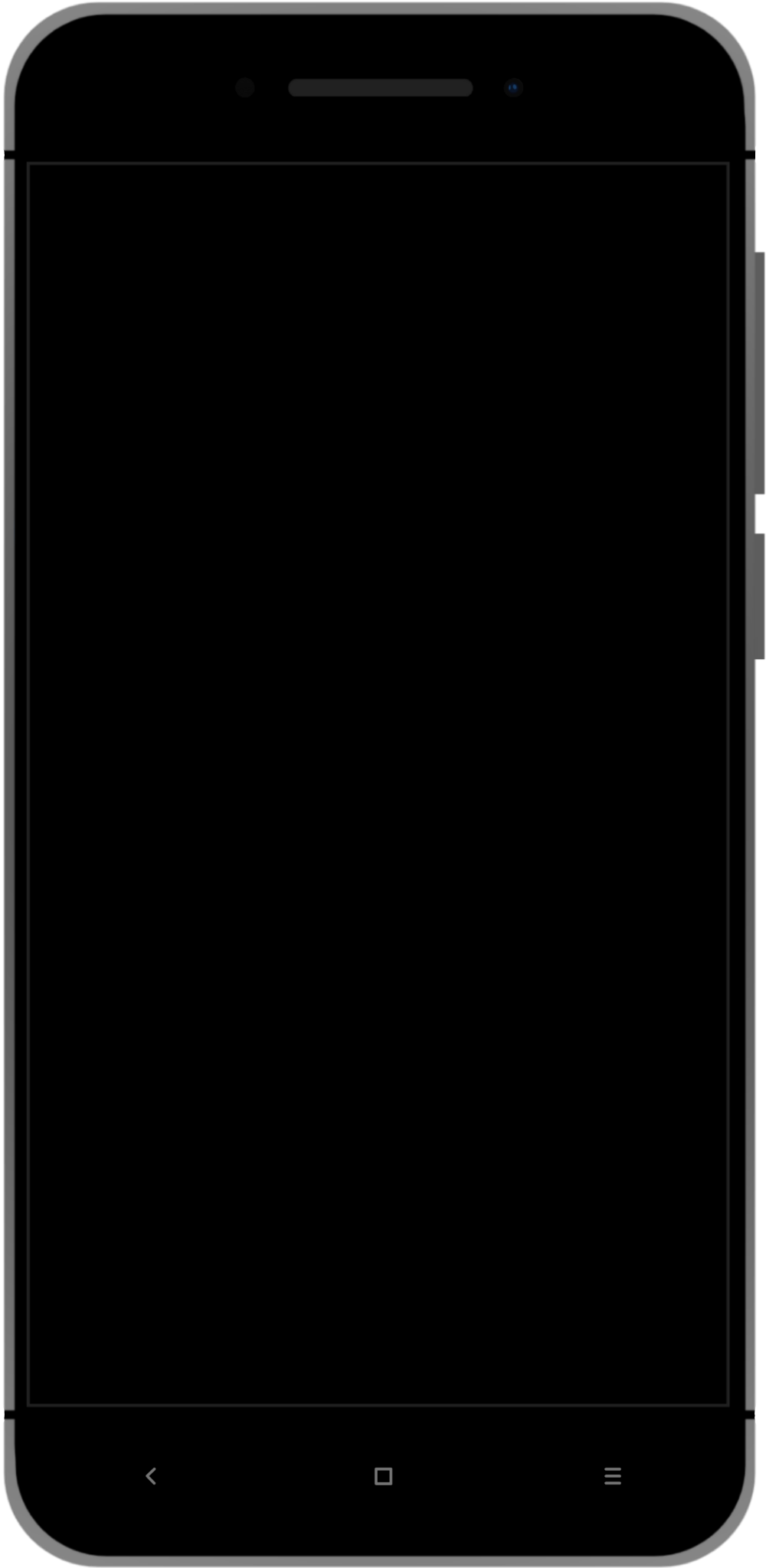
- Xiaomi Redmi Note 4 Front
- Manufacturer: Xiaomi
- Type: Touchscreen smartphone
- Series: Redmi
- First released: MTK: August 2016; 10 years ago Snapdragon: January 2017; 9 years ago
- Predecessor: Redmi Note 3
- Successor: Redmi Note 5
- Compatible networks: GSM: 850/900/1800/1900; HSPA: 850 / 900 / 1900 / 2100; LTE: B3, B5, B40 (India Qualcomm); LTE Cat.6 2CA(50 mbps uplink, 300 mbps downlink)
- Form factor: Slate
- Dimensions: 151 mm (5.9 in) H; 76 mm (3.0 in) W; 8.45 mm (0.333 in) D
- Weight: 165 g (5.8 oz) (Snapdragon Variant) 175 g (6.2 oz) (MediaTek Variant)
- Operating system: Redmi Note 4: Original: Android 6.0 (Marshmallow) with MIUI 7.3 (China) / MIUI 8.0 (Global); Current: Android 6.0 (Marshmallow) with MIUI 10.2; Redmi Note 4 (SD)/4X: Original: Android 6.0 (Marshmallow) with MIUI 8.1; Current: Android 7.0 (Nougat) with MIUI 11.0
- CPU: MediaTek Helio X20 Deca core (TSMC 20nm HKMG) Max. 2.1GHz (2x 2.1 GHz Cortex A72 + 4x 1.85 GHz Cortex A53 + 4x 1.4 GHz Cortex A53) MT6796 or Qualcomm Snapdragon 625 Octa core (14nm Samsung LPP FinFET) Max. 2.0 GHz (8x 2.0 GHz Cortex-A53) MSM8953
- GPU: Redmi Note 4: Mali-T880 MP4 (28nm process) 780MHz; Redmi Note 4 (SD)/4X: Adreno 506 (14nm process) 650MHz
- Memory: 16 GB, 32 GB or 64 GB eMMC 5.1; RAM: 2 GB, 3 GB or 4 GB LPDDR3 32-bit Single-Channel 933MHz
- Removable storage: microSD, up to 128 GB (uses SIM 2 slot)
- SIM: Micro-SIM (SIM1), Nano-SIM (SIM2; Hybrid)
- Battery: Non-removable Li-Po 4100mAh(typ)4000mAh(min) battery
- Charging: 5V@2A (10W) via microUSB 2.0 Port
- Rear camera: 13 MP, Sony Exmor RS IMX258 or Samsung ISOCELL S5K3L8 or Omnivision Purecel OV18355; All sensors have: f/2.0, 0.1s ultra fast phase detection autofocus (PDAF), 1.12μm pixel size, CMOS BSI with dual-LED (dual tone) flash, 5-piece lens, 4K/4K UHD, 120fps slo-mo support.
- Front camera: 5 MP Samsung ISOCELL S5K5E8 f/2.0, 1080p, face recognition support
- Display: 5.5 in (140 mm) IPS LCD capacitive touchscreen 1080 x 1920 pixels, ~401 ppi, 16M colors with 2.5D scratch resistant curved glass. Vendors: BOE, Tianma, EBBG (Late 2017 units onwards)
- Connectivity: Wi-Fi 802.11 a/b/g/n/ac* Dual Band 2.4/5.0 GHz, Wi-Fi Direct, hotspot Bluetooth 4.1, A2DP, LE; (* = Wi-Fi 802.11 ac band supported on MTK variant only)
- Codename: MediaTek: nikel Qualcomm Snapdragon: mido
- SAR: 0.375 W/Kg (Snapdragon Variant)
- Website: www.mi.com/in/note4/

The Xiaomi Redmi Note 4 is the fourth smartphone under the Redmi Note series developed by Xiaomi Inc. It is a part of Xiaomi's budget Redmi smartphone line-up. It has two variants: The older version sold as Redmi Note 4 is powered by a Deca-core MediaTek MT6797 Helio X20 SOC. The upgraded version, sold both as Redmi Note 4X and Redmi Note 4 (where MTK version was not released) is powered by an Octa-core MSM8953 Qualcomm Snapdragon 625 SoC. The Redmi Note 4 was succeeded by Redmi Note 5.

== History ==
In January 2017, the Snapdragon version of the Xiaomi Redmi Note 4 or Xiaomi Redmi Note 4X became the company's first major launch. It came with 2 GB RAM + 32 GB eMMC, 3 GB RAM + 16 or 32 GB eMMC and 4 GB RAM + 64 GB eMMC variants. The phone sports a 5.5-inch Full HD IPS display (1080×1920 resolution), translating to a pixel density of 401 PPI. The display also promises to have a contrast ratio of 1000:1 and 72% coverage of NTSC colour gamut.

On February 14, 2017, alongside the Chinese release of the Redmi Note 4X, Xiaomi released a limited edition set of the phone featuring Hatsune Miku. The set contained a customized box, the phone, a power bank and a protective case.

In October 2017, Lei Jun announced that the sales of Redmi Note 4X exceeded 20 million units globally.

The company announced that as many as 9,624,110 units of Redmi Note 4 were sold in India in 2017 and that it was one of their best-selling smartphones in the last quarter of 2017.

The device sold over 10 Million units in India alone.

The company discontinued the smartphone's sale in favor of the successors Redmi 5 and Redmi Note 5.

== Specifications ==
=== Hardware ===
Xiaomi Redmi Note 4 MTK (codename nikel) is equipped with MediaTek MT6796 Helio X20 CPU and Mali-T880 MP4 GPU. It runs MIUI 8, (updated to MIUI 9.6) based on Android 6.0.

The Global 4 or 4X variant (SD—codename mido), uses Qualcomm's octa-core 2.0 GHz Snapdragon 625 CPU and Adreno 506 GPU.

All variants included an 5.5 in (140 mm) 1080p display, 2, 3 or 4 GB of RAM, 16, 32 or 64 GB eMMC 5.1 Flash storage, a 5MP front camera, non-removable 4100 mAh Li-Po battery (BN41/BN43) and it supports Wi-Fi 802.11a/b/g/n/ac* (* = Wi-Fi 802.11 AC band is supported on MTK variant only) networks on both the 2.4 and 5 GHz bands. Phones also support hybrid SIM and Memory Card configuration, in which the user can have either two SIM cards or a SIM card + microSDHC card at one time because one SIM card and the microSDHC card share the same physical tray slot.

Another notable feature of the phone is the presence of a fingerprint sensor at the back, which can also be used for capturing images via the front or the rear cameras. The device also comes equipped with an RGB Notification LED light and is recognized as one of the last phones by Xiaomi to have an RGB light instead of the monochromatic White color notification LED used in devices launched thereafter.

The Redmi Note 4 (MTK) has screws on each side of the micro-USB port, which allows easy access to internal components. The Redmi Note 4X does not have this pair of screws.

Also, the Redmi Note 4 (MTK) has a full metal body, whereas the Global and Snapdragon variants of the phone have an anodized aluminum body with plastic inserts at the top and bottom for better signal reception. The global variant also does not have the diamond cut finish found on the MediaTek variant of the phone.

=== Software ===
On launch, it ran MIUI 8 based on Android 6.0, which was updated to MIUI 10.2 based on Android 7.0 for Snapdragon devices. Purchasing a Redmi Note 4 Snapdragon variant now will be running MIUI 8 based on Android 6.0.1 instead of Android 6.0. The Global Snapdragon Edition of the device is slated to receive MIUI 11 update based on Android 9.0 in November 2019.

The MediaTek edition, however, runs on MIUI 10 based on Android 6.0.

The Sailfish OS was ported to a Qualcomm version of Note 4.

Through Custom Roms, Android versions up to Android 15 are available for Note 4. It is one of the most widely supported phone in custom Rom community. The degoogled CarbonROM based on Android 12 is also supported.

== Variants comparison ==
Name	Codename	Display	Resolution	Release date	SoC	RAM (LPDDR3 SIngle-Channel)	Storage (eMMC 5.1)	LTE	Rear Camera	Front Camera	Battery	Operating System	MIUI Distribution
Redmi Note 4	nikel	IPS 5.5"	Full HD 1920 x 1080	August 2016	Mediatek Helio X20 MT6797 2 x 2.1 GHz (A72) + 4 x 1.85 GHz (A53) + 4 x 1.4 GHz (A53)	3 GB	32 GB	Yes	13 MP	5 MP	4100 mAh (typical) / 4000 mAh (min/rated)	MIUI 10 Android 6.0 MIUI 8 when released	China, Global and Xiaomi.eu
Redmi Note 4	nikel	IPS 5.5"	Full HD 1920 x 1080	August 2016	Mediatek Helio X20 MT6797 2 x 2.1 GHz (A72) + 4 x 1.85 GHz (A53) + 4 x 1.4 GHz (A53)	3 GB	64 GB	Yes	13 MP	5 MP	4100 mAh (typical) / 4000 mAh (min/rated)	MIUI 10 Android 6.0 MIUI 8 when released	China, Global and Xiaomi.eu
Redmi Note 4	nikel	IPS 5.5"	Full HD 1920 x 1080	August 2016	Mediatek Helio X20 MT6797 2 x 2.1 GHz (A72) + 4 x 1.85 GHz (A53) + 4 x 1.4 GHz (A53)	4 GB	64 GB	Yes	13 MP	5 MP	4100 mAh (typical) / 4000 mAh (min/rated)	MIUI 10 Android 6.0 MIUI 8 when released	China
Redmi Note 4X Redmi Note 4	mido	IPS 5.5"	Full HD 1920 x 1080	January 2017	Qualcomm Snapdragon 625 MSM8953 8 x 2.0 GHz (A53)	2 or 3 GB	16 GB	Yes	13 MP	5 MP	4100 mAh (typical) / 4000 mAh (min/rated)	MIUI 11 Android 7.0 MIUI 8 based on Android 6.0.1 when released	China, Global and Xiaomi.eu
Redmi Note 4X Redmi Note 4	mido	IPS 5.5"	Full HD 1920 x 1080	January 2017	Qualcomm Snapdragon 625 MSM8953 8 x 2.0 GHz (A53)	2 or 3 GB	32 GB	Yes	13 MP	5 MP	4100 mAh (typical) / 4000 mAh (min/rated)	MIUI 11 Android 7.0 MIUI 8 based on Android 6.0.1 when released	China, Global and Xiaomi.eu
Redmi Note 4X Redmi Note 4	mido	IPS 5.5"	Full HD 1920 x 1080	January 2017	Qualcomm Snapdragon 625 MSM8953 8 x 2.0 GHz (A53)	4 GB	64 GB	Yes	13 MP	5 MP	4100 mAh (typical) / 4000 mAh (min/rated)	MIUI 11 Android 7.0 MIUI 8 based on Android 6.0.1 when released	Global and Xiaomi.eu

== Reception ==
The smartphone received mostly positive feedback upon its launch because of its great battery life, CPU performance, good thermal performance, great price-to-performance ratio and a great day-to-day performance.

According to GSMArena, the Redmi Note 4(X)'s Snapdragon 625, provides performance with power efficiency and thermal properties. Also, in GSMArena's device review, the Snapdragon edition of the phone scored better than the specified figures, getting a 1500:1 Contrast ratio, 484 nits of maximum luminance and high colour accuracy for the class.

According to AndroidAuthority, The Redmi Note 4(X) was described as an imperfect yet well-rounded device, recommended for consumers seeking a budget or mid-range smartphone. The publication noted that its design, performance, and overall build (like being packed in a neat chassis) contributed to its value proposition and is a compelling value-for-money smartphone.

Gadgets360 also rated the phone 8 of 10, appreciating the device for its battery efficiency, good performance for the class and good thermal efficiency.

AndroidCentral also considered Redmi Note 4 (SD variant) to be one of the best smartphones one can buy in the mid-budget range, even after 6 months of launch.

TechRadar called Redmi Note 4 to be an overall impressive device overall, though lacking the X factor, getting 4/5 ratings.

Initially, upon launch, it was not received as the true successor of the Redmi Note 3 (Snapdragon variant) mostly because of the use of the Snapdragon 625 as opposed to the Snapdragon 650 in Redmi Note 3 in terms of the RAW performance of the CPU and GPU. Though perceived initially as a theoretical downgrade by media, XDA Developers also considered the device an upgrade to Redmi Note 3, citing its overall sustained performance, on par day-to-day performance and better battery and thermal performance by a good margin. The new Snapdragon 625 was well received by users as well as reviewers after using the device for a while owing to the better fabrication process, battery life and thermal efficiency of the new chipset over the Snapdragon 650.

== Gallery ==
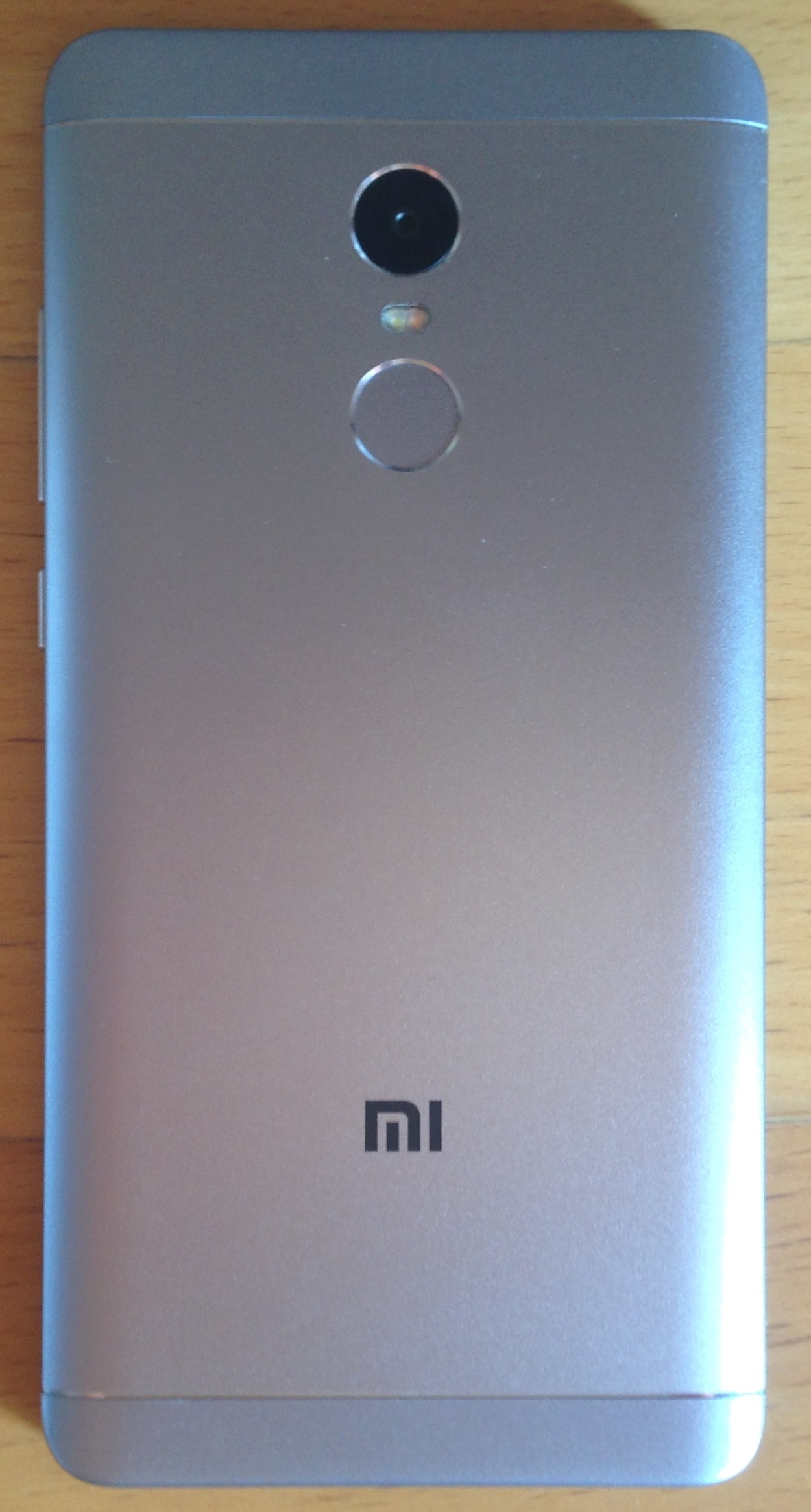
Back of gold Redmi Note 4X

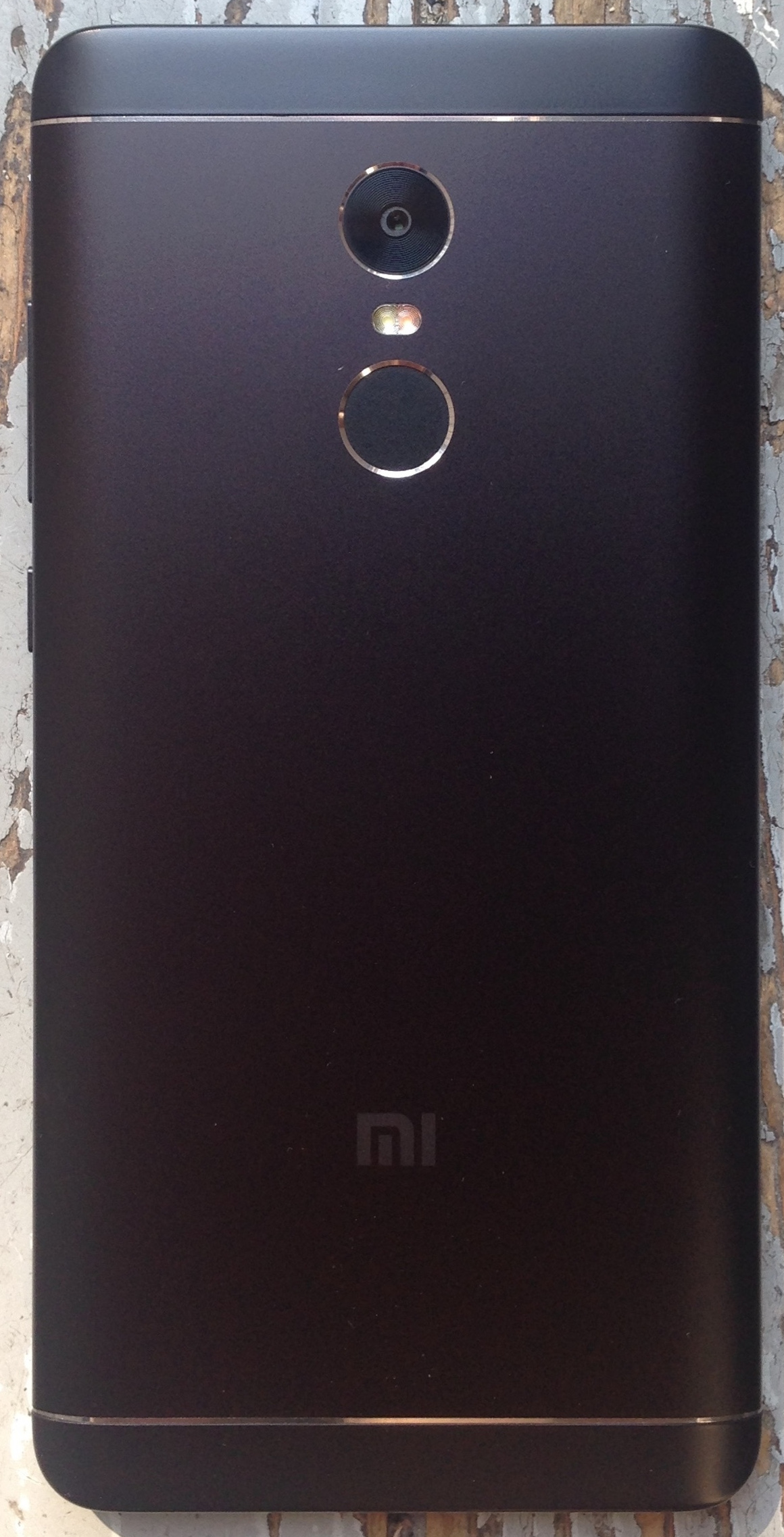
Back of black Redmi Note 4X

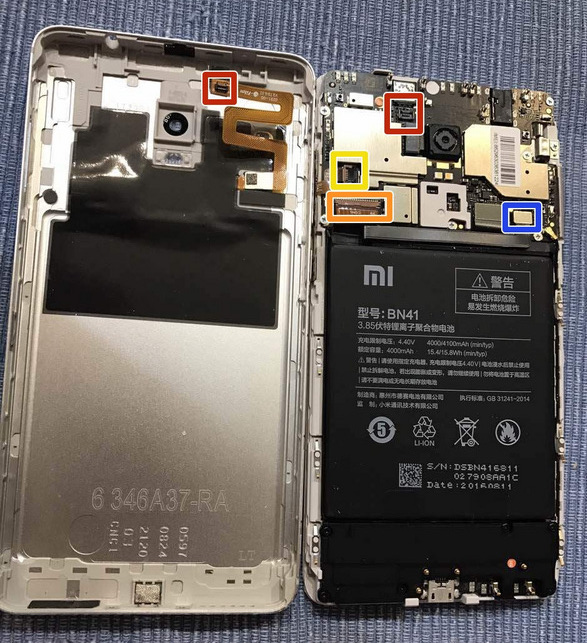
Inside of Redmi Note 4

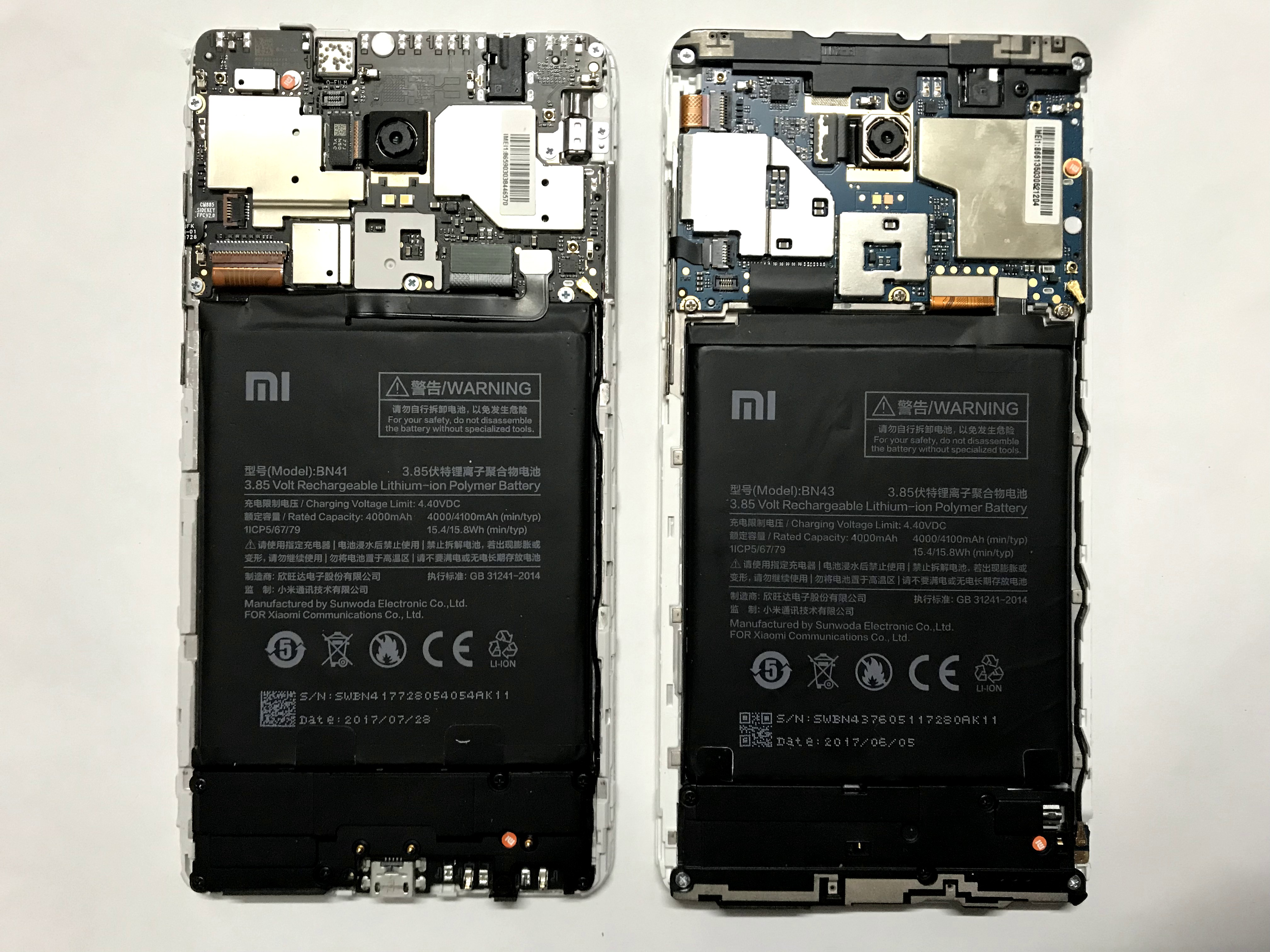
Insides of Redmi Note 4 (X) MTK Version (left) and Qcom Version (right)

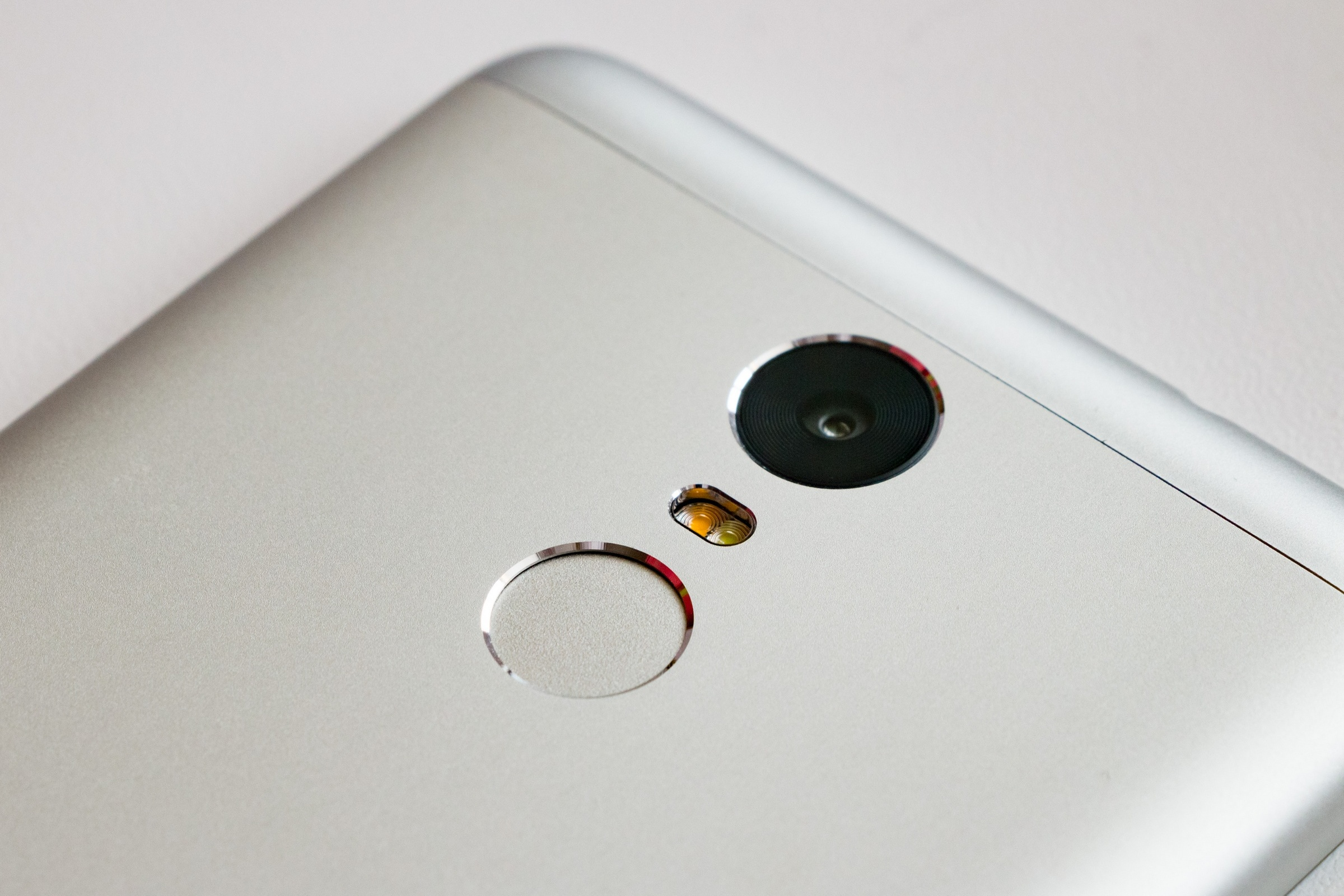
Redmi Note 4 (Camera, Flash and Fingerprint Sensor)
