= Krook =

Krook is a surname. Notable people with this surname include:

- Ab Krook (1944–2020), Dutch speed skater
- Augusta Krook (1853–1941), Finnish teacher and politician
- Caroline Krook (1944–2025), bishop in the Church of Sweden
- Christina Krook (1742–1806), Finnish educator
- Dorothea Krook-Gilead (1920–1989), Israeli literary scholar and translator
- Karl Krook (1887–1966), Swedish tug of war competitor
- Kevin Krook (born 1958), Canadian ice hockey player
- Margaretha Krook (1925–2001), Swedish actress
- Matt Krook (born 1994), American baseball player
- Max Krook (1913–1985), American mathematician and astrophysicist
- Stefan Krook (born 1950), Swedish sailor

== See also ==
- Kr00k, a computer security vulnerability
