= Redmi 5A =

2017 Android-based smartphone made by Xiaomi

- Manufacturer: Xiaomi
- Type: Smartphone
- Series: Redmi
- First released: 16 October 2017; 9 years ago
- Predecessor: Redmi 4A
- Successor: Redmi 6A
- Related: Redmi Note 5A; Redmi 5
- Compatible networks: GSM, 3G, 4G (LTE)
- Form factor: Monoblock
- Colors: Gold, Dark Gray, Rose Gold, Blue
- Dimensions: 140.4×70.1×8.4 mm (5.53×2.76×0.33 in)
- Weight: 137 g (4.8 oz)
- Operating system: Initial: Android 7.1.2 Nougat + MIUI 8.5 (China) / MIUI 9.1 (Global); Current: Android 8.1 Oreo + MIUI 11
- System-on-chip: Qualcomm MSM8917 Snapdragon 425
- CPU: 4x1.4 GHz Cortex-A53
- GPU: Adreno 308
- Memory: 2/3 GB LPDDR3
- Storage: 16/32 GB eMMC 5.1
- Removable storage: MicroSDXC up to 128 GB
- Battery: Non removable, Li-ion 3000 mAh
- Rear camera: Samsung ISOCELL S5K3L8; 13 MP, f/2.2, 29mm (standard), 1/3.1", 1.12µm, PDAF; LED flash, HDR, panorama; 1080p@30fps
- Front camera: Samsung S5K5E8 (CMOS Type); 5 MP, f/2.0, 32mm (standard), 1/5.0", 1.12µm; 1080p@30fps
- Display: IPS LCD, 5.0", 1280 x 720 (HD), 16:9, 296 ppi
- Connectivity: microUSB 2.0, 3.5 mm audio, Bluetooth 4.1 (A2DP, LE), IR port, FM-radio, Wi-Fi 802.11 b/g/n (Wi-Fi Direct, hotspot), GPS, A-GPS, GLONASS, BDS
- SAR: Head 0.53 W/kg; Body 1.23 W/kg
- Other: Accelerometer, proximity sensor

The Redmi 5A is an entry-level Android smartphone developed and manufactured by Xiaomi as a part of its Redmi series. It was first released on October 16, 2017.

== Design ==
The front is made of glass and the case is made of plastic.

The back of the Redmi 5A has a similar design to the Redmi Note 5A .

At the bottom, there's a microUSB port and a microphone. On the top, there's a 3.5mm audio jack, an additional microphone, and an IR blaster. The left side of the smartphone houses a hybrid slot for two SIM cards or one SIM card and a microSD memory card up to 128 GB. On the right side, there's the volume rocker and the power button. The speaker is placed on the back panel.

The Redmi 5A was available in 4 color options: Gold, Dark Gray, Rose Gold and Blue.

== Technical specifications ==
=== Processor ===
The Redmi 5A, like the Redmi 4A, is equipped with the Qualcomm Snapdragon 425 SoC with an Adreno 308 GPU. The smartphone was sold in 2/16 GB and 3/32 GB memory configurations.

The Redmi 5A features a non-removable 3000 mAh battery.

The phone has a 5-inch IPS LCD display with an HD (1560 × 720) resolution, a 16:9 aspect ratio and a pixel density of 296 ppi.

The Redmi 5A features the 13 MP, f/2.2 rear-facing camera with phase detection autofocus and the 5 MP, f/2.0 front-facing camera. Both lenses can record video at up to 1080p@30fps

=== Software ===
The Redmi 5A was released with MIUI 9, which was based on Android 7.1.2 Nougat. Later, the phone was updated to MIUI 11 based on Android 8.1 Oreo.
