= Redmi 6A =

Android smartphone made by Xiaomi

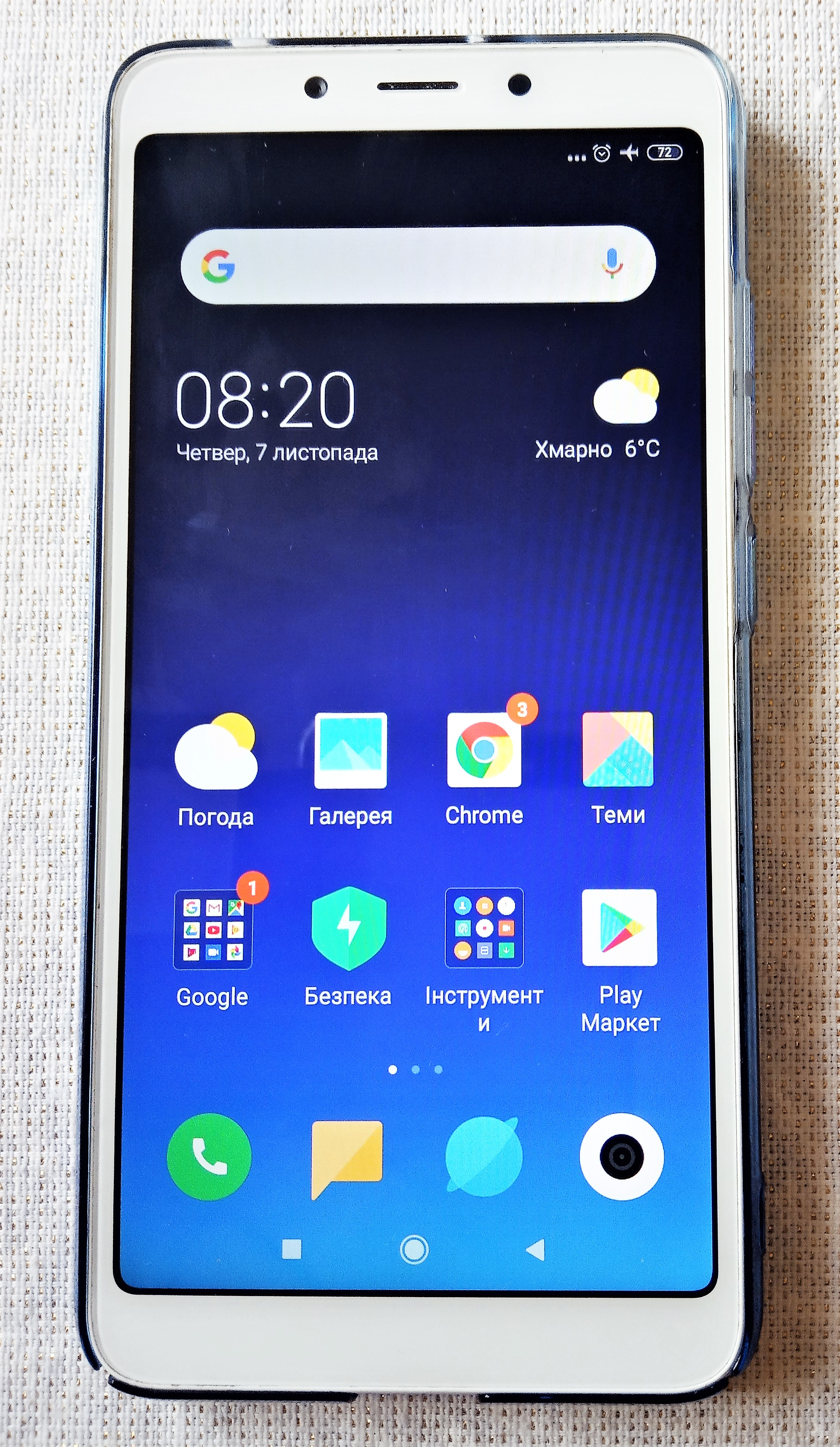
- Developer: Xiaomi
- Manufacturer: Xiaomi
- Type: Smartphone
- Series: Redmi
- First released: June 2018
- Predecessor: Redmi 5A
- Successor: Redmi 7A
- Related: Redmi 6 Redmi 6 Pro
- Compatible networks: 2G, 3G, 4G LTE
- Form factor: Slate
- Colors: Black, Grey, Blue, Gold, Rose Gold
- Weight: 145 g (5 oz)
- Operating system: Original: Android 8.1 Oreo with MIUI 9.6; Current: Global: Android 9 Pie with MIUI 11; China: Android 9 Pie with MIUI 12
- System-on-chip: Mediatek MT6761 Helio A22
- CPU: Quad-core 2.0 GHz Cortex-A53
- GPU: PowerVR GE8320
- Memory: 2/3 GB
- Storage: 16/32 GB
- Removable storage: microSD
- Battery: 3000 mAh
- Rear camera: 13 MP, f/2.2, (wide), PDAF
- Front camera: 5 MP f/2.2
- Display: 5.45", 16:9, 720x1440, IPS LCD, 295 ppi
- Sound: Mono loudspeaker
- Data inputs: MicroUSB 2.0, 3.5mm audio jack, Accelerometer, proximity, compass
- Model: M1804C3CG, M1804C3CH, M1804C3CI
- Website: www.mi.com/redmi6a

The Redmi 6A is a budget smartphone developed by Xiaomi as a part of the Redmi series in June 2018. It is available in 16 GB 2 GB RAM, 32 GB 2 GB RAM, 32 GB 3 GB RAM models.

The Redmi 6A body is non-removable, made of glossy plastic (available in 5 color options: Blue, Gray, Black, Gold, and Rose Gold color options). The IPS display has a 5.45-inch diagonal and a resolution of 1440 × 720 (HD+). The screen's aspect ratio is 18:9, or 2:1.

== Specifications ==
- Features the new 12nm process quad-core high-performance MediaTek Helio A22 central processor, which offers 37% increased performance compared to the Snapdragon 425 and 48% lower power consumption compared to the 28nm process. Additionally, Xiaomi's MIUI system has been specially optimized for this device, reducing its size by 30%.
- Equipped with a built-in 3000mAh battery, a 13-megapixel rear camera, and a 5-megapixel front camera, with the front camera supporting AI portrait mode.
- Features a 5.45-inch full screen display (1440×720 resolution).
