= Redmi Note 2 =

2015 Android smartphone made by Xiaomi

Xiaomi Redmi Note 2
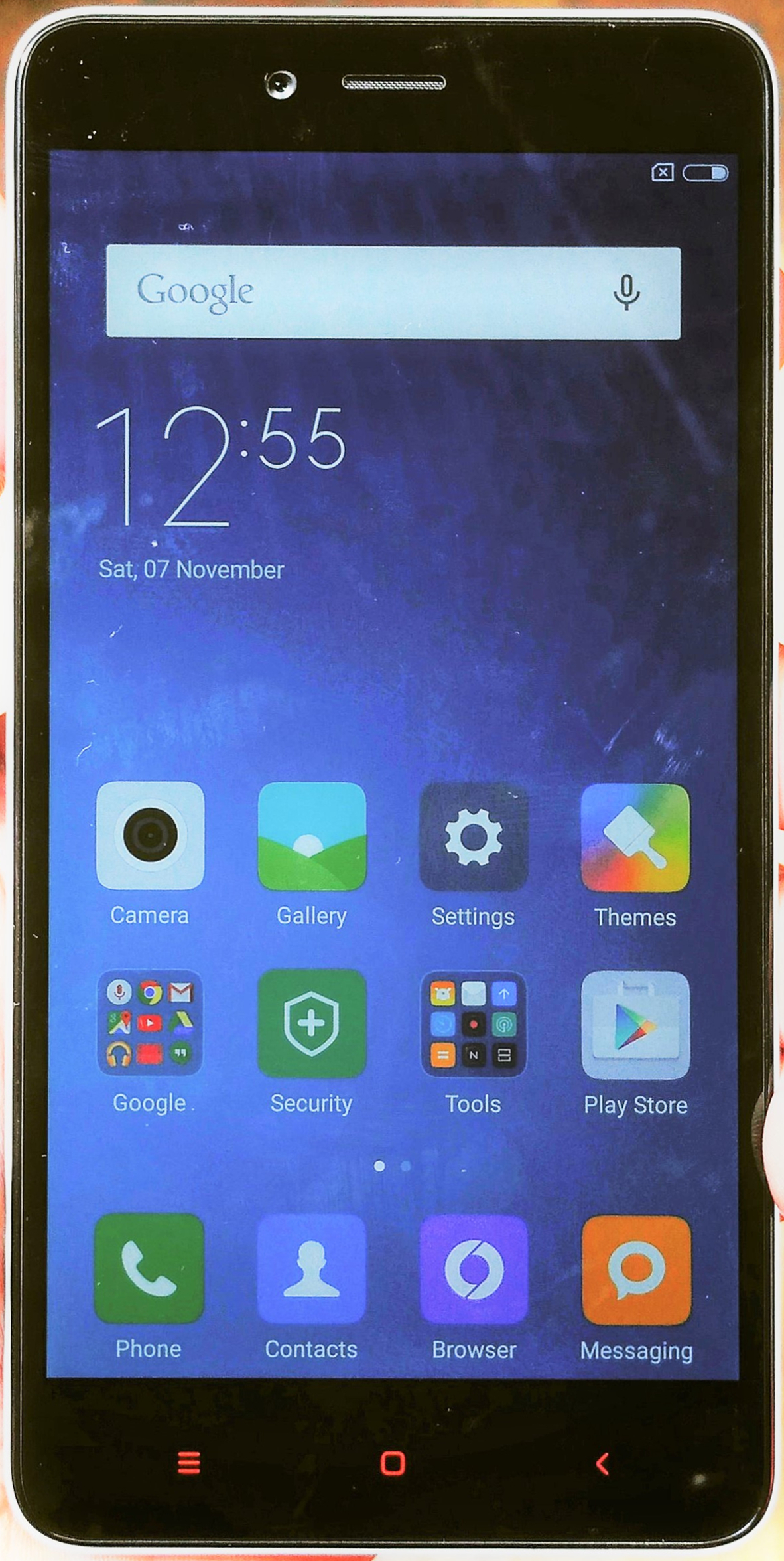
- Manufacturer: Xiaomi
- Type: Touchscreen smartphone
- Series: Redmi
- First released: August 2015; 10 years ago
- Predecessor: Redmi Note
- Successor: Redmi Note 3
- Compatible networks: GSM: 900/1800/1900; HSDPA: 850 / 900 / 1900 / 2100; LTE:, VoLTE 1(2100), 3(1800), 7(2600), 38(2600), 39(1900), 40(2300), 41(2500)
- Form factor: Slate
- Dimensions: 152 mm (6.0 in) H; 76 mm (3.0 in) W; 8.3 mm (0.33 in) D
- Weight: 160 g (5.6 oz)
- Operating system: Android 5.0.2 "Lollipop"
- System-on-chip: MediaTek Helio X10 (MT6795)
- CPU: Redmi Note 2: Octa-core 2.0 GHz Cortex-A53; Redmi Note 2 Prime: Octa-core 2.2 GHz Cortex-A53
- GPU: Imagination PowerVR (Series 6X) G6200
- Memory: 2GB LPDDR3
- Storage: Redmi Note 2: 16 GB; Redmi Note 2 Prime: 32 GB
- Removable storage: Supports up to 32 GB microSD
- Battery: Removable Li-Po 3060 mAh battery
- Rear camera: Single-Camera Setup; Samsung ISOCELL CMOS S5K3M2; 13 MP, f/2.2, 26mm, FoV 75.3°, 1/3.06", 1.12µm, PDAF; Features: LED flash, HDR, panorama; Video: 1080p@30fps
- Front camera: OmniVision Technologies OV5680 CMOS; 5 MP, f/2.0, 27mm (wide), FoV 63.2°; Video: 720p@30fps
- Display: 5.5 in (140 mm) IPS LCD capacitive touchscreen 1080 x 1920 pixels, ~403 ppi, 16M colors
- Connectivity: Wi-Fi 802.11a/b/g/n/ac (2.4 & 5GHz), dual-band, WiFi Direct, hotspot; Bluetooth v4.0, A2DP, Low-energy; 4G/LTE

The Xiaomi Redmi Note 2 is a middle class Android smartphone by Xiaomi. It comes in two variants. It has a 13 MP rear camera and a 5 MP front camera.

The company discontinued the smartphone's sale in favor of the successors Redmi 3 and Redmi Note 3.

== Specifications ==
=== Hardware ===
The low end variant Redmi Note 2 was powered by a MediaTek MT6795 Helio X10 Octa-core 2.0 GHz Cortex-A53 prosessor coupled with 2 GB of RAM and 16 GB of internal storage. The high-end variant Redmi Note 2 Prime, on the other hand, was powered by a MediaTek MT6795 Helio X10 Octa-core 2.2 GHz Cortex-A53 processor coupled with 2 GB of RAM and 32 GB of internal storage.

=== Software ===
Xiaomi Redmi Note 2 runs on Android Lollipop 5.0 on top of MIUI 7 and can be upgraded to MIUI 9. It is also possible to flash a custom ROM with Android 5, 6, 7, 8 or 9, but there is no official support by LineageOS.

Famous problem - fast battery drain.
