= Xiaomi Redmi 3S =

2016 Android smartphone by Xiaomi

Xiaomi Redmi 3S Xiaomi Redmi 3X Xiaomi Redmi 3S Plus/Prime
- Brand: Xiaomi
- Manufacturer: Xiaomi
- Type: Smartphone
- Series: Redmi
- First released: Redmi 3S: 15 June 2016; 10 years ago Redmi 3X: 30 June 2016; 9 years ago Redmi 3S Prime: 3 October 2016; 9 years ago
- Predecessor: Xiaomi Redmi 2
- Successor: Xiaomi Redmi 4X
- Related: Xiaomi Redmi 3
- Compatible networks: GSM, 3G, 4G (LTE)
- Form factor: Monoblock
- Colors: Dark Gray (3S, 3S Prime), Silver (3S, 3S Prime, 3X), Gold (3S, 3S Prime, 3X)
- Dimensions: 139.3×69.6×8.5 mm (5.48×2.74×0.33 in)
- Weight: 144 g (5.1 oz)
- Operating system: Initial: Android 6.0.1 Marshmallow + MIUI 7 Current: Android 6.0.1 Marshmallow + MIUI 10
- System-on-chip: Qualcomm MSM8937 Snapdragon 430 (28 nm) Qualcomm MSM8937 Snapdragon 430,
- CPU: 4x1.4 GHz Cortex-A53
- GPU: Adreno 505
- Memory: Redmi 3S & 3X: 2 GB; Redmi 3S Prime: 3 GB LPDDR3
- Storage: Redmi 3S: 16 GB; Redmi 3S Prime & 3X: 32 GB eMMC 5.1
- Battery: Li-Ion 4100 mAh, non-removable
- Charging: 10W
- Rear camera: 13 MP, f/2.0, PDAF; LED Flash, HDR, panorama Video: 1080p@30fps
- Front camera: 5 MP, f/2.2 Video: 1080p@30fps
- Display: IPS LCD, 5.0", 1280 × 720 (HD), 16:9, 294 ppi
- Connectivity: microUSB 2.0, 3.5 mm Audio, Bluetooth 4.1 (A2DP), IrDA, FM-radio, Wi-Fi 802.11 b/g/n (Wi-Fi Direct, hotspot), GPS, A-GPS, GLONASS, BDS
- SAR: Head: 0.62 W/kg; Body: 0.43 W/kg

The Xiaomi Redmi 3S is a smartphone from the phone company Xiaomi, which is an improved version of Xiaomi Redmi 3. It was announced and released on June 15, 2016. On June 30, 2016, Xiaomi introduced the Xiaomi Redmi 3X, which had 2GB of RAM and 32GB of storage. In October of the same year, Xiaomi introduced the Xiaomi Redmi 3S Prime (also known as Xiaomi Redmi 3S Plus), which differed in that it only had a 3GB/32GB version.

== Design ==
The 3S was made of metal, with a laminated display. The 3S featured a hybrid slot for either 2 SIM cards or 1 SIM card and a microSD memory card up to 128GB. The 3S Prime included a fingerprint sensor.

The Xiaomi Redmi 3S and Redmi 3S Prime were sold in 3 colors: Dark Gray, Silver, and Gold.

The Xiaomi Redmi 3X was available in 2 colors: Silver and Gold.

== Technical specifications ==
=== Processor ===
Smartphones received a Qualcomm Snapdragon 430 processor and an Adreno 505 graphics processor.

=== Battery ===
The battery capacity of the phone is 4100 mAh.

=== Camera ===
The smartphones have a 13 MP main camera with f/2.2 aperture and autofocus, capable of recording video in 1080p resolution at 30 fps. The front camera has a 5 MP resolution, f/2.2 aperture, and can record video in 1080p resolution at 30 fps.

=== Display ===
The smartphones has a 5.0-inch IPS LCD display with an HD resolution (1280 x 720) and a 16:9 aspect ratio, with a pixel density of 294 ppi.

=== Storage ===
The storage configuration depends on the variant:

- The Xiaomi Redmi 3S was sold in configurations of 2/16 GB.
- The Xiaomi Redmi 3X was sold in a configuration of 2/32 GB.
- The Xiaomi Redmi 3S Prime was sold in a configuration with 3GB of RAM and 32GB of internal storage.

=== Software ===
All smartphones were released with MIUI 7 based on Android 6.0.1 Marshmallow. They were later updated to MIUI 10. The Redmi 3S allows bootloader unlocking and custom ROMs installs, and as a result the phone can be updated to Android 14 with the degoogled lineageOS or LineageOS with microG.
