= Redmi S2 =

Android smartphone developed by Xiaomi

Redmi S2 (Redmi Y2 in India)
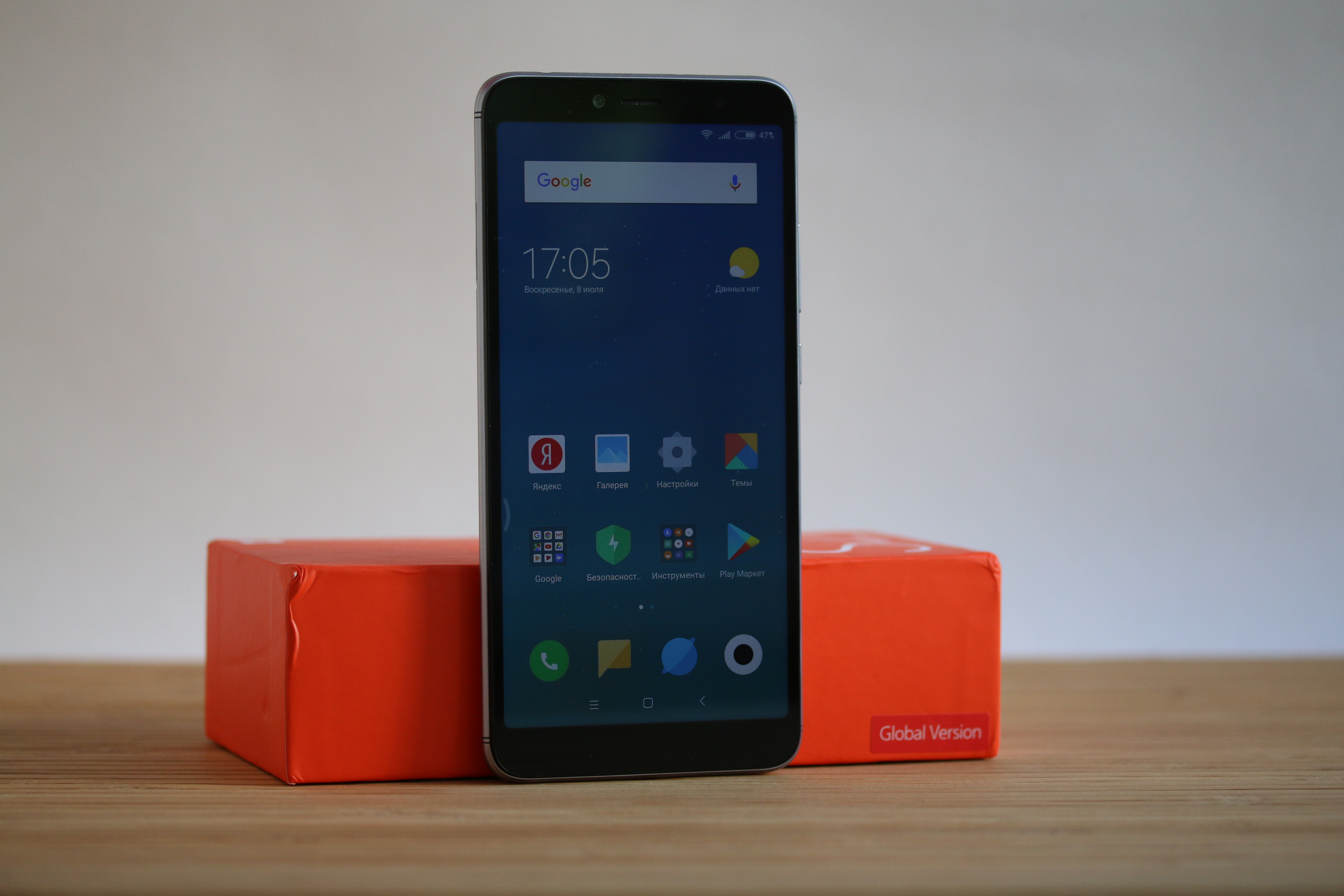
- Manufacturer: Xiaomi
- Type: Smartphone
- Series: Redmi/Redmi Y
- First released: May 2018
- Predecessor: Redmi Y1
- Successor: Redmi Y3
- Compatible networks: 2G, 3G, 4G LTE
- Form factor: Slate
- Weight: 170 g (6 oz)
- Operating system: Original: Android 8.1 Oreo with MIUI 9 Current: Android 9 Pie with MIUI 12
- System-on-chip: Qualcomm MSM8953 Snapdragon 625 (14 nm)
- CPU: Octa-core 2.0 GHz (8x Cortex-A53)
- GPU: Adreno 506
- Memory: 3/4GB
- Storage: 32/64 GB
- Removable storage: microSD
- Battery: 3080 mAh
- Rear camera: 12 MP, f/2.2, 1.25μm, PDAF; 5 MP, f/2.4, (depth)
- Front camera: 16 MP, f/2.5, (wide), 1/3.06" 1.0µm
- Display: 5.99", 16:9, 720x1440, IPS LCD, 269 ppi
- Sound: Mono loudspeaker
- Data inputs: MicroUSB 2.0, 3.5mm audio jack
- Model: M1803E6G, M1803E6H, M1803E6I
- Website: www.mi.com/global/redmi-s2/specs

The Redmi S2, also known as Redmi Y2 in India, is a budget smartphone released by Xiaomi under the series Redmi in May 2018. It is the successor to Redmi Y1.

== Reception ==
Amritanshu Mukherjee from Deccan Chronicle praised the smartphone's battery functions, design, and model, writing overall "Redmi Y2 is a great budget smartphone that ticks all the right boxes and specialises in the optics department. If you are seeking good camera performance fused in a package that is overall a great daily driver, then look no further." Ehsanur Raza Ronny from The Daily Star rated the smartphone a 6.75, stating "Xiaomi has made an excellent budget device which is jam-packed with good features." Sudhanshu Singh from TechRadar rated the smartphone 3.5 out of 5 stars, praising the smartphone's front camera features and its build, but also stating that it was "slightly bulky" and its poor handling with one hand. Subhrojit Mallick of Digit wrote "The Redmi Y2 doesn’t bring anything groundbreaking to the table. It's bland, but functional", blaming the smartphone for its image quality and battery life, but described its design as "predictable, but reliable". Khalid Anzar of Business Standard wrote the overall performance of the smartphone as a "great proposition as a selfie smartphone in the budget segment". Saurabh Singh of India Today wrote that the Redimi Y2 was "better, nay, way better than the Redmi Y1", while Karan Bajaj of The Economic Times wrote "In our opinion, the Redmi Y2 proves to be a great all-rounder smartphone for its price", but also wrote that the troubling factor was "at the same price you also have the option of the Redmi Note 5. The Note 5 has a metal body, similar hardware specifications but a bigger 4,000mAh battery". The smartphone was also reviewed by Shruti Dhapola of The Indian Express, Mike Wobker of Notebookcheck, and by Hindustan Times.
