= Redmi 7 =

2019 Android smartphone made by Xiaomi

Redmi 7 Redmi Y3
- Brand: Redmi
- Manufacturer: Xiaomi
- Type: Smartphone
- Series: Redmi, Redmi Y
- First released: 7: March 18, 2019; 7 years ago Y3: April 25, 2019; 7 years ago
- Availability by region: 7: worldwide Y3: India
- Predecessor: Redmi 6 Redmi Y2
- Successor: Redmi 8
- Related: Redmi 7A; Redmi Note 7
- Compatible networks: GSM / CDMA / HSPA / LTE
- Form factor: Slate
- Colors: Lunar Red, Eclipse Black, Comet Blue
- Dimensions: 158.7 mm (6.25 in) H 75.6 mm (2.98 in) W 8.5 mm (0.33 in) D
- Weight: 180 g (6.3 oz)
- Operating system: Original: Android 9 Pie with MIUI 10; Current (Global)/Y3: Android 10 with MIUI 11; Current (China): Android 10 with MIUI 12.5
- System-on-chip: Qualcomm Snapdragon 632 (14 nm)
- CPU: Qualcomm Snapdragon 632 (14 nm), 8 cores (4×1.8 GHz Kryo 250 Gold & 4x1.8 GHz Kryo 250 Silver)
- GPU: Adreno 506
- Memory: 7: 2 and 3 GB RAM; Y3: 3/4 GB; LPDDR3
- Storage: 7: 16/32/64 GB; Y3: 32/64 GB eMMC 5.1
- Removable storage: MicroSDXC up to 512 GB
- SIM: Dual SIM (Nano-SIM, dual stand-by)
- Battery: Non-removable, Li-Po 4000 mAh
- Charging: 10 W
- Rear camera: 12 MP, f/2.2, 1/2.9", 1.25 μm, PDAF; 2 MP, (depth); LED flash, HDR, panorama; 1080p@30/60fps
- Front camera: 7: 8 Mp, f/2.0, 1/4", 1.12 μm Y3: 32 Mp, f/2.2, 26 mm (wide-angle lens), 1/2.8", 0.8 μm HDR; 1080p@30fps
- Display: 6.26 in (159 mm); 720 x 1520 px resolution, 19:9 ratio (~269 ppi density); Corning Gorilla Glass 5, IPS LCD
- Sound: Speakers
- Connectivity: microUSB 2.0, 3.5 mm Audio, Bluetooth 4.2 (A2DP, LE, aptX HD), IR port, FM radio, Wi-Fi 802.11 b/g/n, Wi-Fi Direct, hotspot, GPS, A-GPS, GLONASS, GALILEO, BDS (7)
- Data inputs: Multi-touch screen; microUSB 2.0; Fingerprint scanner (rear-mounted); Accelerometer; Proximity sensor; Compass
- Water resistance: Splash resistant
- Model: 7: M1810F6LG, M1810F6LH, M1810F6LI; Y3: M1810F6G, M1810F6I
- Codename: 7: onclite Y3: onc
- SAR: 1.10 W/kg (head); 1.02 W/kg (body)
- Other: Fingerprint scanner (on the back), accelerometer, proximity sensor, compass

The Redmi 7 is an Android-based smartphone as part of the Redmi series, a sub-brand of Xiaomi Inc. It was announced on March 18, 2019 and it was released on March 20, 2019.

== Design ==
The screen is made of Corning Gorilla Glass 5, while the frame and back are made of plastic.

The design of the Redmi 7 and Redmi Y3 is similar to the Redmi Note 7.

At the bottom are the microUSB connector, a speaker and a microphone stylized as a speaker. On top are 3.5 mm audio jack, a second microphone and IR port. On the left side of the smartphone there is a slot for 2 SIM cards, or 1 SIM card and a microSD format memory card up to 512 GB. On the right side are the volume buttons and the smartphone lock button.

The Redmi 7 was sold in 3 colors: Black eclipse, Blue comet and Red echo.

The Redmi Y3 was sold in 3 colors: Prime Black, Elegant Blue and Bold Red.

== Specifications ==
=== Platform ===
The smartphones are equipped with the Qualcomm Snapdragon 632 SoC with the Adreno 506 GPU.

=== Battery ===
The smartphones feature a non-removable 4000 mAh.

=== Camera ===
The smartphones received a rear dual camera setup with a 12 MP (f/2.2) main lens, which has phase detection autofocus and the ability to record video at up to 1080p@60fps, and a 2 MP depth sensor.

The Redmi 7 features an 8 MP (f/2.0) front-facing camera, and the Redmi Y3 features a 32 MP (f/2.2) front-facing camera. Front cameras in both models can record video at up to 1080p@30fps.

=== Screen ===
The dmartphones feature a 6.26-inch IPS LCD with an HD+ (1560 × 720) resolution, a 19:9 aspect ratio, a 269 ppi pixel density, and a teardrop-shaped cutout for the front-facing camera.

=== Memory ===
Redmi 7 was sold in configurations of 2/16, 3/32 and 3/64 GB.

Redmi Y3 was sold in configurations of 3/32 and 4/64 GB.

=== Software ===
The smartphones were launched on MIUI 10 running Android 9 Pie. The global version of the Redmi 7 and Redmi Y3 firmware have been updated to MIUI 11, and the Chinese version of the Redmi 7 firmware has been updated to MIUI 12.5; both based on Android 10. Redmi 7 and Redmi Y3 global firmware were planned to be updated to MIUI 12, but the development of this update was stopped due to many compatibility and performance issues. The Chinese model was updated to MIUI 12.5 based on Android 10.

== Reception and sales ==
Android Authority rated the Redmi 7 6.3, judging the performance to be good, the battery life excellent and the colors beautiful, criticizing the quality of the plastics used for the back cover and the side frame, the ease of use and the finishes.

AndroidWorld praised the autonomy, camera and display of the Redmi 7, criticizing the lack of support for HD content from streaming services, the body, which gets dirty easily, and the fact that it is equipped with a port microUSB instead of USB-C.

The Redmi 7A, however, had the approval of TechRadar with regards to the battery, whose duration was defined as "exceptional", the presence of the integrated FM radio, without the need to insert earphones, something that has become rare in smartphones; he also defined the performance as decent considering the low price and the absence of NFC and the fingerprint reader as disappointing.
