= Redmi 7A =

2019 Android smartphone made by Xiaomi

- Brand: Redmi
- Manufacturer: Xiaomi
- Type: Smartphone
- Series: Redmi
- First released: May 24, 2019; 7 years ago
- Availability by region: July 4, 2019; 7 years ago
- Predecessor: Redmi 6A
- Successor: Redmi 8A
- Related: Redmi 7 Redmi Note 7
- Compatible networks: List: Technology: GSM / HSPA / LTE; 2G bands: GSM 850 / 900 / 1800 / 1900; 3G bands: HSDPA 850 / 900 / 1900 / 2100; 4G bands (LTE): 1, 2, 3, 4, 5, 7, 8, 20, 38, 40 - Global; 1, 3, 5, 8, 40, 41 - India; 1, 3, 5, 8, 34, 38, 39, 40, 41 - China; Speed: HSPA , LTE
- Form factor: Slate
- Colors: Matte Black, Morning Blue, Matte Blue, Matte Gold, Gem Red, Gem Blue
- Dimensions: 146.3 mm (5.76 in) H 70.4 mm (2.77 in) W 9.6 mm (0.38 in) D
- Weight: 165 g (5.8 oz)
- Operating system: Original: Android 9.0 with MIUI 10.2; Current: Android 10 with MIUI 12.5
- System-on-chip: Qualcomm Snapdragon 439 (12 nm TSMC 12FFC)
- CPU: Octa-core (4x1.95 GHz Cortex-A53 & 4x1.45 GHz Cortex-A53)
- GPU: Adreno 505 (650 MHz)
- Modem: Snapdragon X6 LTE
- Memory: 2 / 3 GB RAM (LPDDR3)
- Storage: 16 / 32 GB (eMMC 5.1)
- Removable storage: microSDXC, expandable up to 256 GB
- SIM: Dual nano-SIM
- Battery: 4000 mAh lithium-polymer, non-removable
- Charging: 10W Standard Charge
- Rear camera: Single-Camera Setup; Global, India: Sony Exmor RS IMX 486; 12 MP, f/2.2, 1/2.9", 1.25µm, PDAF; China: Samsung ISOCELL S5K3L8; 13 MP, f/2.2, 1/3.1", 1.12µm, PDAF; Camera features: LED flash, HDR; Video recording: 1080p@30fps
- Front camera: Samsung S5K5E8; 5 MP, f/2.2, 1/5.0", 1.12µm, FF; Camera features: HDR; Video recording: 1080p@30fps
- Display: 5.45 in (138 mm); 720 x 1440 px resolution, 18:9 ratio (~295 ppi density); IPS LCD, 60Hz
- Sound: Loudspeaker, 3.5 mm auxiliary (headphone jack)
- Connectivity: Wi-Fi 802.11 b/g/n (2,4 GHz), Wi-Fi Direct
- Data inputs: Multi-touch screen; Micro-USB 2.0, OTG; Accelerometer; Proximity sensor; Compass
- Water resistance: Splash resistant
- Model: MZB7995IN, M1903C3EG, M1903C3EH, M1903C3EI
- Codename: pine
- Development status: Discontinued
- Website: www.mi.com/in/redmi-7a/

Xiaomi Redmi 7A is a smartphone developed by Xiaomi Inc. The smartphone is available in three colour variants — Matte Blue, Matte Gold, and Matte Black. With 5.45-inch HD+ display, Redmi 7A comes in two storage variants, one with 2 GB RAM and 16 GB storage, and one with 3 GB RAM and 32 GB storage.

The smartphone is the predecessor to the Xiaomi Redmi 8A, which was released the same year.

== Specifications ==
=== Hardware ===
The Redmi 7A comes with 5.45-inch HD+ (720×1440 pixels) display with an 18:9 aspect ratio. The phone has an octa-core Qualcomm Snapdragon 439 SoC, coupled with 2 GB/3 GB (non-global version) of RAM and 16 GB/32 GB of internal storage which is expandable via microSD card. The phone has a single 12-megapixel Sony IMX486 camera at the back along with an LED flash and PDAF, and a 5 MP camera on the front for selfies. Additionally, Redmi 7A has an AI Face Unlock, AI Scene Detection features, and 4000 mAh battery with 10 W charging support.

=== Software ===
The device runs MIUI 10.2 based on Android 9 Pie out of the box. It is upgradable to MIUI 12.5 based on Android 10.

== See also ==
- Redmi
- Redmi 5
