= Redmi 4 =

2016 Android-based smartphone

Xiaomi Redmi 4 Xiaomi Redmi 4 Prime/Pro
- Developer: Xiaomi
- Manufacturer: Xiaomi
- Type: Smartphone
- Series: Redmi
- First released: 4 November 2016; 9 years ago
- Predecessor: Redmi 3
- Successor: Redmi 5
- Related: Redmi 4A; Redmi 4X
- Compatible networks: GSM, 3G, 4G (LTE)
- Form factor: Slate
- Colors: Dark gray, silver, gold
- Dimensions: 141.3×69.6×8.9 mm (5.56×2.74×0.35 in)
- Weight: 156 g (5.5 oz)
- Operating system: Original: Android 6.0.1 Marshmallow + MIUI 8 Current: Android 6.0. 1 Marshmallow + MIUI 10
- System-on-chip: Redmi 4: Qualcomm MSM8937 Snapdragon 430 (28 nm); Redmi 4 Prime: Qualcomm MSM8953 Snapdragon 625 (14 nm)
- CPU: Redmi 4: 8×1.4 GHz Cortex-A53; Redmi 4 Prime: 8×2.0 GHz Cortex-A53
- GPU: Redmi 4: Adreno 505; Redmi 4 Prime: Adreno 506
- Memory: Redmi 4: 2 GB; Redmi 4 Prime: 3 GB; LPDDR3
- Storage: Redmi 4: 16 GB; Redmi 4 Prime: 32 GB eMMC 5.1
- Removable storage: microSDXC up to 128 GB
- SIM: Dual SIM (Micro-SIM + Nano-SIM)
- Battery: Non-removable, Li-Po 4100 mAh
- Rear camera: Both models: 13 MP, f/2.2, PDAF; HDR, panorama Video: 1080p@30fps Redmi 4: LED flash Redmi 4 Prime: 2-LED dual-tone flash
- Front camera: 5 MP, f/2.2 Video: 1080p@30fps
- Display: Both models: IPS, 5.0", 16:9; Redmi 4: 1280 × 720 (HD), 296 ppi Redmi 4 Prime: 1920 × 1080 (FHD), 441 ppi
- Connectivity: microUSB 2.0, 3.5 mm Audio, Bluetooth 4.1 (Redmi 4)/4.2 (Redmi 4 Prime) (A2DP, LE), IR port, FM radio, Wi-Fi 802.11 a/b /g/n (dual-band, Wi-Fi Direct, hotspot), GPS, A-GPS, GLONASS, BDS
- Model: Redmi 4: 2016090; Redmi 4 Prime: 2016060
- Codename: Redmi 4: prada Redmi 4 Prime: markw
- SAR: Redmi 4: Head 0.35 W/kg; Body 0.99 W/kg; Redmi 4 Prime: Head 0.77 W/kg; Body 0.83 W/kg
- Other: Fingerprint scanner (rear), proximity sensor, accelerometer, gyroscope, compass, Hall-effect sensor

The Xiaomi Redmi 4 and Xiaomi Redmi 4 Prime (also known as Xiaomi Redmi 4 Pro) are Android smartphones of Xiaomi that belongs to the Redmi series. They were announced on November 4, 2016 alongside Xiaomi Redmi 4A. The Redmi Turbo 4 Pro is an unrelated 2025 model.

== Design ==
The screen is made of glass. The case of smartphones is made of aluminum with a plastic strip on top.

From the back, the smartphones look similar to the Redmi Note 4. The smartphones differ in appearance only in the LED flash placing (in the Redmi 4, it is to the right of the camera, and in the Redmi 4 Prime, it is to the left).

At the bottom are the microUSB port, the speaker and the speaker-styled microphone. On top are 3.5 mm audio jack, a second microphone and IR port. On the left side there is a hybrid slot for 2 SIM cards or 1 SIM card and a microSD memory card up to 128 GB. On the right side are the volume rocker and the smartphone lock button. The fingerprint sensor is on the back.

The Redmi 4 and Redmi 4 Prime were sold in 3 colors: dark gray, silver and gold.

== Specifications ==
=== Hardware ===
The Redmi 4 had a Qualcomm Snapdragon 435 SoC with an Adreno 505 GPU, while Redmi 4 Prime had a Qualcomm Snapdragon 625 SoC and an Adreno 506 GPU. The base model was sold in 2/16 GB memory configuration, while the Prime model was sold in the 3/32 GB memory configuration. Both models use LPPDR4X RAM and eMMC 5.1 storage.

The models have a non-removable 4100 mAh Li-Po battery.

The Redmi 4 and Redmi 4 Prime had a back 13 MP camera with an f/2.2 aperture and phase detection autofocus, and a front-facing 5 MP camera with an f/2.2 aperture. Both cameras can record video at up to 1080p@30fps.

The smartphones had a 5-inch IPS LCD display with an aspect ratio of 16:9. The Redmi 4 display has an HD (1280 × 720 pixels) resolution with a pixel density of 296 ppi, while on the Redmi 4 Prime it is Full HD (1920 × 1080) and 441 ppi respectively.

=== Software ===
The models were launched with MIUI 8 based on Android 6.0.1 Marshmallow and have been updated to MIUI 10.
