= Redmi 4A =

2016 Android-based smartphone made by Xiaomi

Xiaomi Redmi 4A
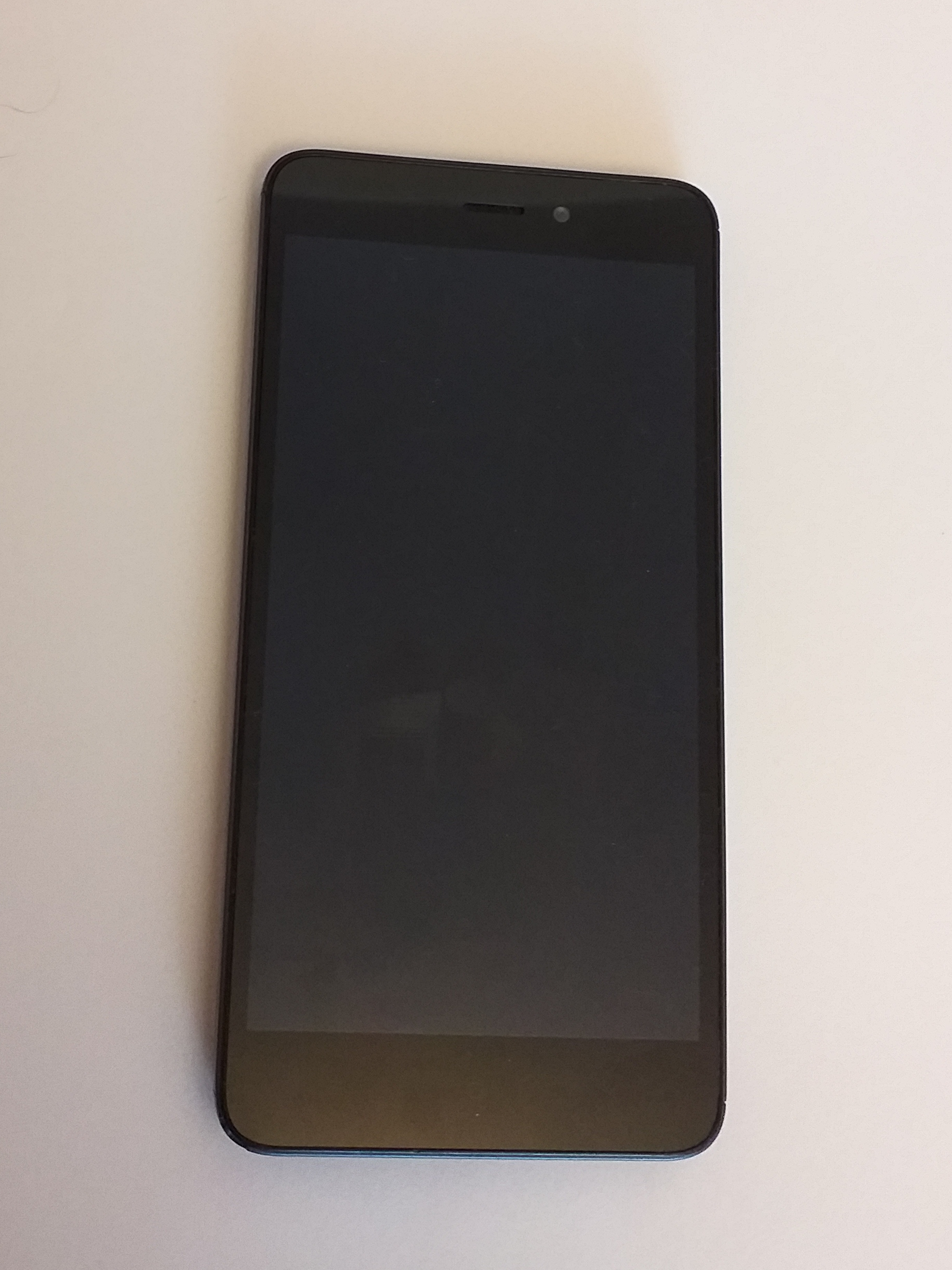
- Brand: Redmi
- Manufacturer: Xiaomi
- Type: Smartphone
- Series: Redmi
- First released: 4 November 2016; 10 years ago
- Predecessor: Redmi 2A
- Successor: Redmi 5A
- Related: Redmi 4 Redmi 4X
- Compatible networks: GSM, 3G, 4G (LTE)
- Form factor: Monoblock
- Dimensions: 139.9×70.4×8.5 mm (5.51×2.77×0.33 in)
- Weight: 131.5 g (4.64 oz)
- Operating system: Initial: Android 6.0.1 Marshmallow + MIUI 8 Current: Android 7.1.2 Nougat + MIUI 10
- CPU: Qualcomm MSM8917 Snapdragon 425, 4×1.4 GHz Cortex-A53
- GPU: Adreno 308
- Memory: 2 GB, LPDDR3
- Storage: 16/32 GB, eMMC 5.1
- Removable storage: MicroSDXC up to 128 GB
- Battery: Non-removable, Li-Ion 3120 mAh
- Rear camera: 13 MP, f/2.2, AF; LED flash, HDR, panorama Video: 1080p@30fps
- Front camera: 5 MP, f/2.2 Video: 720p@30fps
- Display: IPS LCD, 5.0", 1280 × 720 (HD), 16:9, 296 ppi
- Connectivity: microUSB 2.0, 3.5 mm Audio, Bluetooth 4.1 (A2DP, LE), IR port, FM radio, Wi-Fi 802.11 a/b/g/n (dual-band, Wi-Fi Direct, hotspot), GPS, A-GPS, GLONASS, BDS
- SAR: Head 0.53 W/kg; Body 1.18 W/kg
- Other: Proximity sensor, accelerometer, gyroscope

Xiaomi Redmi 4A is an entry-level smartphone from the Chinese company Xiaomi. It was unveiled on November 4, 2016, together with Xiaomi Redmi 4 and Redmi 4 Prime. Is the successor of the smartphone Xiaomi Redmi 2A.

== Design ==
The smartphone screen is made of glass. The body of the smartphone is made of matte plastic.

From the back, the smartphone looks like the Xiaomi Redmi 4X.

The microUSB connector and the microphone are located below. On top are 3.5 mm audio jack, a second microphone and IR port. On the left side, there is a hybrid slot for 2 SIM cards or 1 SIM card and a microSD format memory card up to 128 GB. On the right side are the volume buttons and the smartphone lock button. The speaker of the smartphone is located on the back panel.

In Ukraine, Xiaomi Redmi 4A was sold in 3 colours: dark grey, gold and Rose Gold.

== Specifications ==
=== Platform ===
The smartphone received a Qualcomm Snapdragon 425 processor and an Adreno 308 graphics processor.

=== Battery ===
The battery received a volume of 3120 mAh.

=== Camera ===
The smartphone received a main camera of 13 MP, f/2.0 with autofocus and the ability to record video in resolution 1080p@30fps. The front camera has a resolution of 5 MP, an aperture of f/2.2 and the ability to record video in a resolution of 720p@30fps.

=== Screen ===
Screen IPS LCD, 5.0", HD (1280 × 720) with an aspect ratio of 16:9 and a pixel density of 296 ppi.

=== Memory ===
The smartphone was sold in 2/16 and 2/32 GB configurations.

=== Software ===
Xiaomi Redmi 4A was launched on MIUI 8 based on Android 6.0.1 Marshmallow. Was updated to MIUI 10 based on Android 7.1.2 Nougat.
