= Redmi Note 3 =

2015 and 2016 Android Smartphones manufactured by Xiaomi

Xiaomi Redmi Note 3

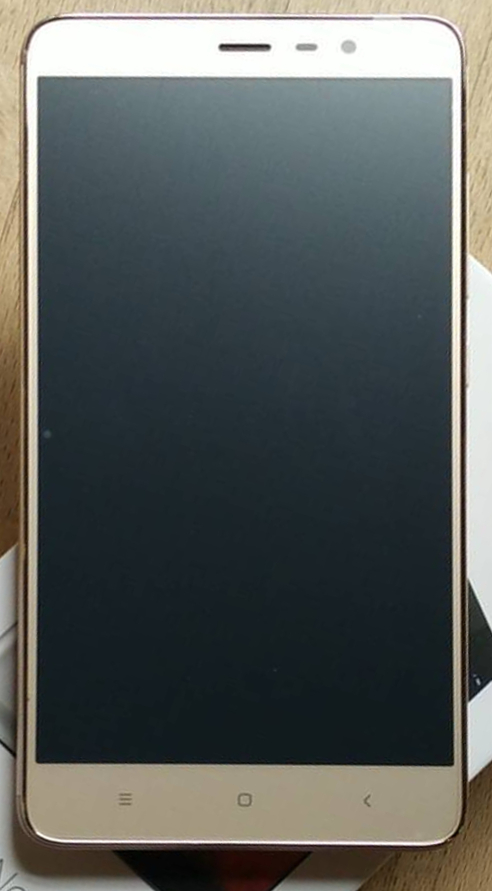
- Xiaomi Redmi Note 3 Gold (MTK)
- Manufacturer: Xiaomi
- Type: Touchscreen smartphone
- Series: Redmi
- First released: Snapdragon: February 2016; 10 years ago India: March 2016; 10 years ago MediaTek: November 2015; 10 years ago
- Predecessor: Redmi Note 2
- Successor: Redmi Note 4
- Compatible networks: kenzo: 2G GSM: 800/900/1800/1900; 3G HSPA: 850/900/1700(AWS)/1900/2100; 4G LTE: VoLTE 1 (2100), 2 (1900), 3 (1800), 4 (1700/2100), 5 (850), 7 (2600), 8 (900), 38 (2600), 39 (1900), 40 (2300), 41 (2500)
- Form factor: Slate
- Dimensions: 150 mm (5.9 in) H; 76 mm (3.0 in) W; 8.7 mm (0.34 in) D
- Weight: 164 g (5.8 oz)
- Operating system: Snapdragon: Android 5.1.1 "Lollipop" upgradeable to: Android 6.0.1 "Marshmallow" MediaTek: Android 5.0.2 "Lollipop"
- System-on-chip: Qualcomm MSM8956 Snapdragon 650; MediaTek MT6795 Helio X10
- CPU: Snapdragon: Hexa-core (4x1.4GHz Cortex-A53 & 2x1.8GHz Cortex-A72); MediaTek: Octa-core 2.0GHz Cortex-A53
- GPU: Snapdragon: Adreno 510; MediaTek: PowerVR G6200
- Memory: 2 GB (Standard version) or 3 GB RAM (High version)
- Storage: 16 GB (Standard version) or 32 GB (High version)
- Removable storage: Only Snapdragon variant: Up to 256 GB microSD
- Battery: Non-removable Li-Po 4050 mAh battery
- Rear camera: Snapdragon: Samsung S5K3P3 16 MP camera, f/2.0 aperture, phase detection autofocus (PDAF), dual-LED (dual tone) flash MediaTek: Samsung S5K3M2 13 MP camera
- Front camera: OmniVision OV5670 5MP, f/2.0 aperture
- Display: 5.5 in (140 mm) IPS LCD capacitive touchscreen 1080 x 1920 pixels, ~403 ppi, 16M colors
- Connectivity: Wi-Fi 802.11a/b/g/n/ac (2.4 & 5GHz), dual-band, Wi-Fi Direct, hotspot; Bluetooth v4.1, A2DP, Low-energy; 4G/LTE
- Codename: kate (Special Edition Snapdragon) kenzo (Snapdragon) hennessey (MediaTek)
- Development status: Discontinued
- Website: hennessey/kenzo: www.mi.com/note3/ kenzo: www.mi.com/en/note3/ kate: www.mi.com/tw/note3/

The Xiaomi Redmi Note 3 is a smartphone developed by Xiaomi Inc. as part of Xiaomi's low-end Redmi smartphone line. It has three variants:

- The MediaTek variant (codenamed hennessey) was released on November 24, 2015.
- The Snapdragon variant (codenamed kenzo) was launched in February, 2016.
- Redmi Note 3 Special Edition (codenamed kate) was launched in June 2016; it features an upgraded modem and a new housing, other specifications are the same as the Snapdragon variant.

== Specifications ==
=== Hardware ===
The MediaTek variant of the Xiaomi Redmi Note 3 is powered by the MediaTek MT6795 Helio X10 system-on-chip with a 2.0 GHz octa-core ARM Cortex-A53 CPU and a PowerVR G6200 GPU. The Snapdragon variants are powered by the Snapdragon 650 system-on-chip with a hexa-core CPU consisting of a high performance cluster with 2x 1.8 GHz ARM Cortex-A72 cores and a high efficiency cluster with 4x 1.6 GHz ARM Cortex-A53 cores, and an Adreno 510 GPU. The phone comes with 2 GB or 3 GB of RAM and 16 GB or 32 GB of eMMC 5.0 internal flash storage.

Another notable difference between the MediaTek and Qualcomm variants of the phone is the rear-facing camera; there is a 13 MP camera sensor on the MediaTek variant whereas this is upgraded to a 16 MP sensor on the Qualcomm variants. There is also a 5 MP front-facing camera on all variants.

All variants of the Xiaomi Redmi Note 3 include a 5.5 in (140 mm) 1080p display with 1080x1920 pixels resolution and 403 ppi pixel density. The Snapdragon variants use a special display technology known as 'Sunlight Display' in which the phone detects the ambient light and makes pixel-level adjustments in order to improve legibility under the sunlight. The phone also features a blue light filter for low light (night) reading.

Another notable feature of the phone is the presence of a fingerprint sensor at the back. It can also be used for taking photos via the front-facing or rear-facing camera. The phone has a 4050 mAh Li-Po non-removable battery.

==== Connectivity ====
The Xiaomi Redmi Note 3 has Wi-Fi 802.11 a/b/g/n/ac, thus supporting both the 2.4 GHz and 5 GHz bands. The MediaTek variant supports two SIM cards while the Snapdragon variants have a SIM card and a microSDHC/SIM card hybrid slot; the microSDHC slot can also be used as a secondary SIM card slot.

Wi-Fi	Yes
Wi-Fi standards supported	802.11 a/b/g/n/ac
GPS	Yes
Bluetooth	Yes, v 4.10
NFC	No
Infrared	Yes
USB On-The-Go	Yes
3.5 mm headphone jack	Yes
FM radio	Yes
Number of SIM card slots	2

=== Software ===
The Snapdragon variant (kenzo) runs on an Android based MIUI 7 OS which was updated to MIUI 8 based on Android 6.0 and then to MIUI 10. Many custom Android ROMs are available for this device; notable examples are MIUI 9 based on Android 7.0, CyanogenMod 13 and 14 (based on Android Marshmallow and Nougat, respectively), Lineage OS 13, 14, 15, Resurrection Remix OS 8.6 (based on Android 10) and an unstable port of Sailfish OS. Custom ROMs based on Android Lollipop, Marshmallow, Nougat, Oreo, Pie, 10, 11 and 12 are also available, like Pixel Experience, ArrowOS, HavocOS, etc.

The Redmi Note 3 Special Edition (kate) came with MIUI 8 based on Android 6.0 which can be updated to MIUI 10.

Although both of the Snapdragon-based variants (kenzo and kate) are similar with their ROMs, their firmware aren't compatible with each other and installing the wrong one may brick the device.

The MediaTek variant (hennessey) runs on MIUI 7, it can be updated to MIUI 9 but didn't get a MIUI 10 update.

On 21 December 2018, Xiaomi announced the end of software support for the phone. In January 2019, it received its final MIUI update.

== Sales ==
On 25 August 2016, Xiaomi reported it had sold around 1.75 million units since March 2016. It also became the highest-shipped smartphone in India's online market in Q2 2016. It also became India's best online selling phone after it sold 2.3 million units until September 2016.

In September 2017, InsightPortal reported the phone ranked 10th in their list of top ten devices worldwide with a market share of 1.1%.

== Parts providers ==
Redmi Note 3, a stylish smartphone back in 2016, had the following parts providers:

- System-on-chip: Qualcomm or MediaTek
- Modem: Qualcomm or MediaTek
- PMIC: Qualcomm or MediaTek
- Wi-Fi/Bluetooth: Qualcomm or MediaTek
- Display panel: Sharp, Tianma, BOE
- Touchscreen: Focaltech, Atmel
- Camera: Samsung, OmniVision
- Battery: Sunwoda, Coslight
- Fingerprint reader: FPC, Goodix
