= Redmi 4X =

2017 Android-based smartphone made by Xiaomi

Xiaomi Redmi 4X (Xiaomi Redmi 4 in India)
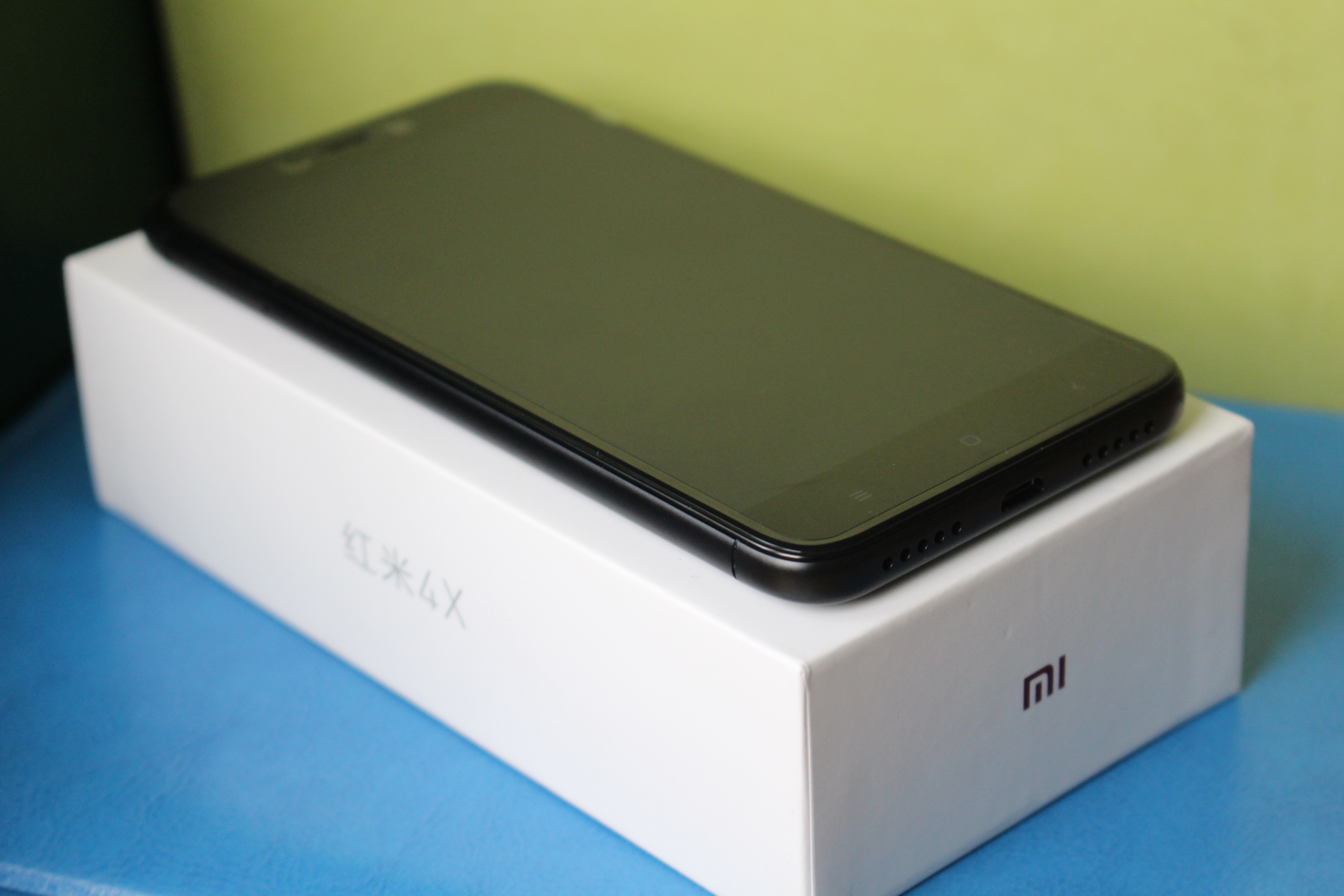
- Developer: Xiaomi
- Manufacturer: Xiaomi
- Type: Smartphone
- Series: Redmi
- First released: 14 February 2017; 9 years ago
- Predecessor: Redmi 3 Redmi 3X
- Successor: Redmi 5
- Related: Redmi 4 Redmi 4A
- Compatible networks: GSM, 3G, 4G (LTE)
- Form factor: Slate
- Colors: Black, gold and rose gold
- Dimensions: 139.2×70×8.7 mm (5.48×2.76×0.34 in)
- Weight: 150 g (5.3 oz)
- Operating system: Initial: Android 6.0.1 Marshmallow + MIUI 8 Current: Android 7.1.2 Nougat + MIUI 11
- System-on-chip: Qualcomm MSM8940 Snapdragon 435
- CPU: 8×1.4 GHz Cortex-A53
- GPU: Adreno 505
- Modem: Qualcomm Snapdragon X9 LTE
- Memory: Redmi 4X: 2/3 GB; Redmi 4 (India): 2/3/4 GB; LPDDR3
- Storage: Redmi 4X: 16/32 GB; Redmi 4 (India): 16/32/64 GB eMMC 5.1
- Removable storage: MicroSDXC up to 128 GB
- SIM: Hybrid Dual SIM (Micro-SIM + Nano-SIM)
- Battery: Non-removable, Li-Po 4100 mAh
- Charging: 10 W
- Rear camera: 13 Mp, f/2.0, PDAF; LED flash, HDR, panorama Video: 1080p@30fps
- Front camera: 5 Mp, f/2.2 Video: 1080p@30fps
- Display: IPS LCD, 5.0", 1280 × 720 (HD), 16:9, 294 ppi
- Connectivity: microUSB 2.0, 3.5 mm Audio, Bluetooth 4.2 (A2DP, LE), IR port, FM radio, Wi-Fi 802.11 b/g/n (Wi-Fi Direct), GPS, A-GPS, GLONASS, BDS
- Model: Redmi 4X: MAE136, MAG138, MAT136; Redmi 4 (India): MAI132
- Codename: santoni
- SAR: Head 0.77 W/kg; Body 0.83 W/kg
- Other: Fingerprint scanner (rear), proximity sensor, accelerometer, gyroscope, compass

The Xiaomi Redmi 4X is an Android budget smartphone developed by Xiaomi company as a part of the Redmi series and an improved version of the Redmi 4. It was announced on February 14, 2017. In India, the Redmi 4X was sold as Xiaomi Redmi 4.

== Design ==
The front of the Redmi 4X is made of glass and the body is made of aluminium with plastic strips on top and bottom.

From the back, the smartphone looks like the Redmi 4A.

At the bottom are the microUSB connector, the speaker and the speaker-styled microphone. On top are 3.5 mm audio jack, a second microphone and IR port. On the left side of the smartphone there is a hybrid slot for 2 SIM cards or 1 SIM card and a microSD format memory card up to 128 GB. On the right side are the volume buttons and the smartphone lock button. The fingerprint scanner is located on the back panel.

The Redmi 4X was sold in 3 colors: black, gold and rose gold.

== Specifications ==
=== Hardware ===
The smartphone features a Qualcomm Snapdragon 435 SoC with an Adreno 505 GPU. The Redmi 4X was sold in 2/16 and 3/32 GB memory configurations, and the Indian version of the Redmi 4 was sold in of 2/16, 3/16, 3/32, 4/32 and 4/64 GB memory configurations.

The battery received a volume of 4100 mAh.

The Redmi 4X features a 5-inch IPS LCD display with HD (1280 × 720) resolution, a 16:9 aspect ratio of and a pixel density of 294 ppi.

The smartphone also received the main 13 MP with an f/2.0 aperture and phase detection autofocus, and the front 5 MP an f/2.2 aperture of. Both cameras are capable of recording video at up to 1080p@30fps.

=== Software ===
The smartphone was released on MIUI 8 based on Android 6.0.1 Marshmallow. Later, the phone was updated to MIUI 11 based on Android 7.1.2 Nougat.
