= Augusta Krook =

Finnish politician

Member of the Finnish Parliament
- In office 1909–1910
- Constituency: Vaasa Province (north)

Personal details
- Born: 31 October 1853 Helsinki, Grand Duchy of Finland
- Died: 27 June 1941 (aged 87) Helsinki, Finland
- Party: Swedish People's Party of Finland
- Profession: Teacher

Augusta Krook (31 October 1853 — 27 June 1941) was a Finnish politician and teacher. She served as a Member of the Parliament of Finland in 1909–1910, representing the Swedish People's Party.

Krook's father was General Carl August Krook, and her mother Elisabeth née Collan.

She studied at a private German-speaking school, and went on to qualify as a teacher of languages. She worked as a teacher and later headmistress for 40 years, first in Helsinki and later in Vaasa.

Krook was one of the founders of the women's paramilitary Lotta Svärd organisation, and founded in 1919 its first local chapter, in Helsinki. She was also a board director of the Martha organisation.
