= Xiaomi Mi A2 Lite =

Android smartphone manufactured by Xiaomi

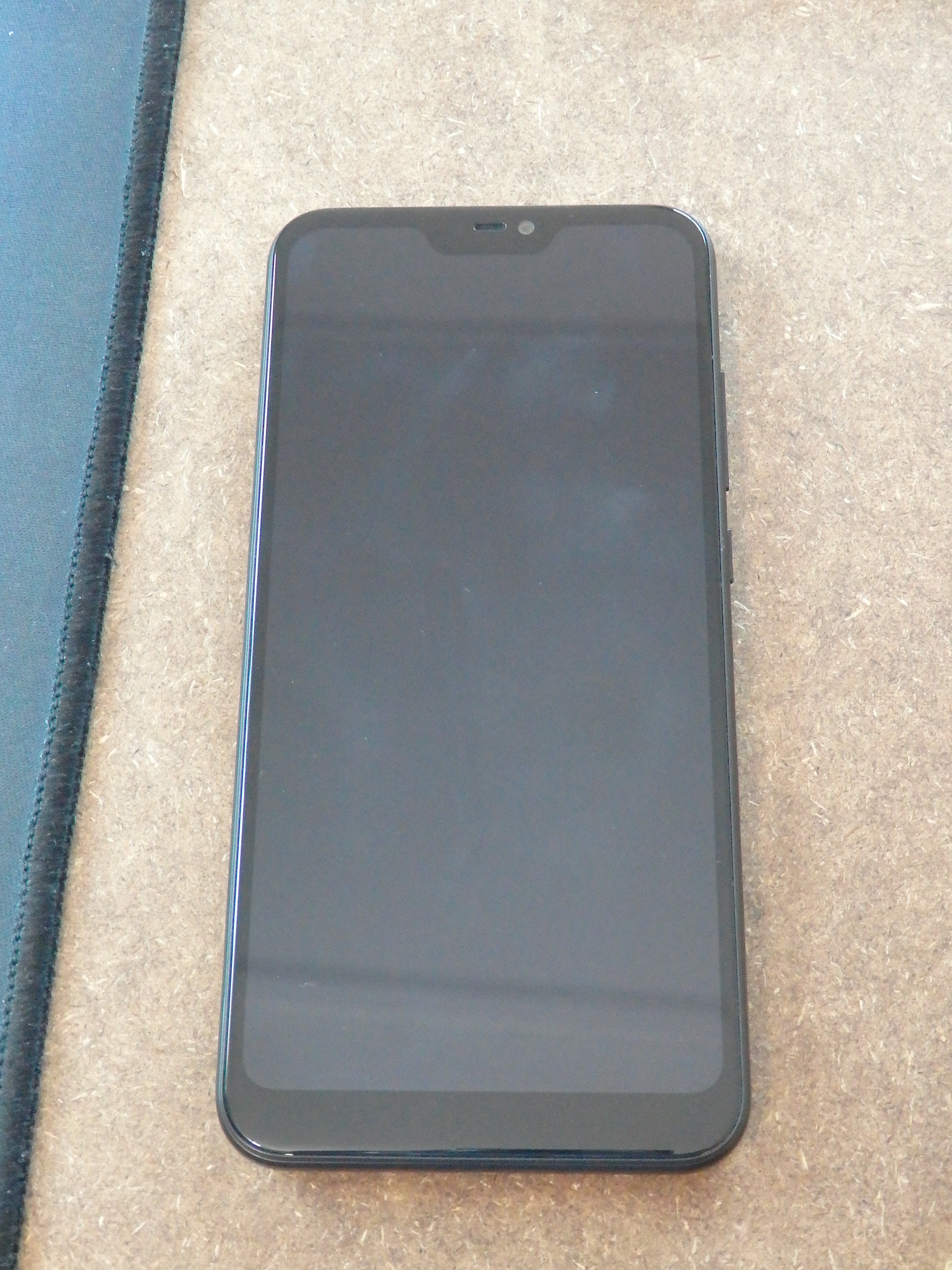
- Mi A2 Lite
- Manufacturer: Xiaomi
- Type: Smartphone
- Series: Mi A
- First released: July 24, 2018; 7 years ago
- Predecessor: Redmi 5 Plus
- Related: Xiaomi Mi A2
- Compatible networks: GSM: 800/900/1800/1900; HSPA: 850 / 900 / 1900 / 2100; LTE:, VoLTE 1(2100), 2(1900), 3(1800), 4(1700/2100), 5(850), 7(2600), 8(900), 20(800), 34(2000), 38(2600), 39(1900), 40(2300), 41(2500)
- Form factor: Slate
- Dimensions: 149.3 mm (5.88 in) H; 71.7 mm (2.82 in) W; 8.8 mm (0.35 in) D
- Weight: 178 g (6.3 oz)
- Operating system: Android 8.1 "Oreo", upgrade-able to Android 10 (Mi A2 Lite), Android 9 (Redmi 6 Pro)
- System-on-chip: Qualcomm MSM8953 Snapdragon 625
- CPU: Octa-core (8x2.0GHz Cortex-A53)
- GPU: Adreno 506
- Memory: 3/4 GB
- Storage: 32/64 GB
- Battery: Non-removable Li-Po 4000 mAh battery
- Rear camera: Dual 12/5 MP phase detection autofocus, HDR, LED flash
- Front camera: 5.0 MP, face detection, HDR
- Display: 5.84 in (148 mm) IPS LCD, 1080 x 2280 pixels, ~432 ppi, 16M colors
- Codename: Daisy (Mi A2 Lite), Sakura (Redmi 6 Pro)
- Website: https://www.mi.com/global/mi-a2-lite

The Xiaomi Mi A2 Lite is a budget smartphone developed by Xiaomi, a global version of the company's Redmi 6 Pro, co-developed by Google as part of its Android One project.

== Specifications ==
=== Hardware ===
The phone features a 5.84 inches Full HD+ (1080 x 2280 pixels resolution) 432ppi pixel density display, semi-metal body. It is powered by a Qualcomm Snapdragon 625 processor along with Adreno 506 GPU and has a 2.0 micro USB connector. It has a dual rear camera (Primary camera is 12MP sensor of 1.25μm pixel size and f2.2 aperture and Secondary has 5MP sensor of 1.12μm pixel size with f2.2 aperture). The front camera is 5MP sensor of f2.0 aperture. The battery is of 4000 mAh.

=== Software ===
The Xiaomi Mi A2 Lite is part of the Android One program, where software updates are provided directly from Google.

It is preinstalled with Android 8.1.0 "Oreo" out of the box, and can be upgraded to Android 10.

Mi A2 Lite is a part of the Android One program and has a Stock Android experience and UI which is comparable to that of Google Pixel UI.

=== Release ===
The Xiaomi Mi A2 Lite is a re-branded Xiaomi Redmi 6 Pro phone. It was released in July 2018.

The company discontinued the smartphone's sale in favor of the successors Redmi 7 and Redmi Note 7.
