= Redmi Note 5A =

Smartphone model

Redmi Note 5A (Redmi Y1 Lite in India) Redmi Note 5A Prime (Redmi Y1 in India)
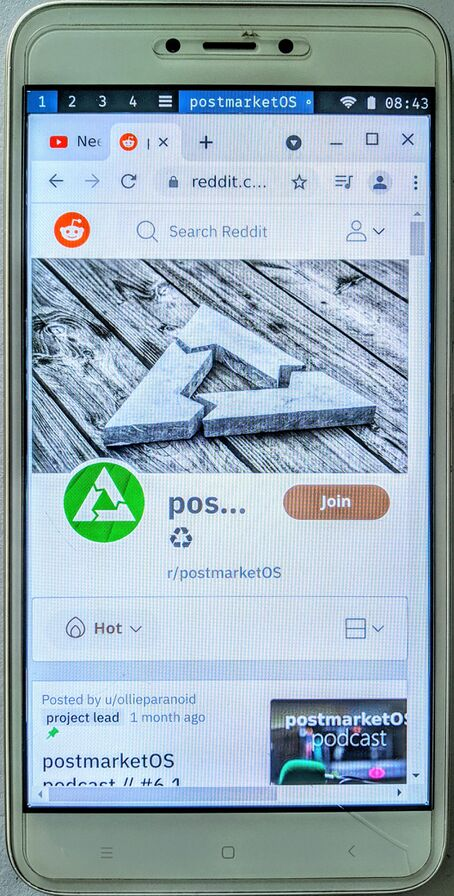
- Manufacturer: Xiaomi
- Type: Phablet
- Series: Redmi Note/Redmi Y
- Successor: Redmi Y2
- Form factor: Slate
- CPU: Redmi Note 5A: Qualcomm Snapdragon 425; Redmi Note 5A Prime: Qualcomm Snapdragon 435
- Battery: Non-removable Li-Po 3080 mAh battery
- Charging: 10W
- Display: 5.5 in (140 mm) IPS LCD capacitive touchscreen 720 X 1280 pixels, ~267 ppi, 16M colors
- Connectivity: Wi-Fi 802.11b/g/n, WiFi Direct, hotspot; Bluetooth v4.2, A2DP, Low-energy; 4G/LTE
- Model: Redmi Note 5A: MDI6; Redmi Note 5A Prime: MDI6S, Redmi Y1, Redmi Note 5A
- Codename: Redmi Note 5A: ugglite Redmi Note 5A Prime: ugg

Xiaomi Redmi Note 5A is a smartphone developed by Xiaomi Inc. in Xiaomi's low-end Redmi smartphone line. It has two variants, the cheaper Redmi Note 5A with Snapdragon 425 SoC, and the more expensive Redmi Note 5A Prime with Snapdragon 435.

The phone has been renamed to Redmi Y1 in India, where film star Katrina Kaif launched the Redmi Y line of smartphones in Delhi on November 2, 2017.

The company superseded it with the upgraded successors Redmi 6/6A/6 Pro and Redmi Note 6/6 Pro, and further models later.

== Specifications ==
=== Hardware ===
The Xiaomi Redmi Note 5A has a 5.5-inch IPS LCD, Quad-core 1.4 GHz processor(Model: mdg6), 2GBof RAM and 16GB of internal storage or Octa-core 1.4 GHz Cortex-A53 Qualcomm Snapdragon 435 processor, 3/4 GB of RAM and 32/64 GB of internal storage that can be expanded using microSD cards up to 256 GB. The phone has a 3080 mAh Li-ion battery, a 13 MP rear camera with LED flash and 16 MP front-facing camera with auto-focus. It is available in Gold, Dark Grey, Silver, Rose Gold colors.

=== Software ===
On release Redmi Note 5A and Note 5A Prime worked on MIUI 8 based on Android 7.1.2. They were updated to MIUI 11.

== Sales ==
Xiaomi Redmi Note 5A went on sale in August 2017. The price was pegged at RMB 699 for the base model and RMB 899 for the Prime variant.

Xiaomi sold over 150,000 units of Redmi Note 5A and Redmi Note 5A Prime in 3 minutes after the India release on November 8, 2017.

== Gallery ==
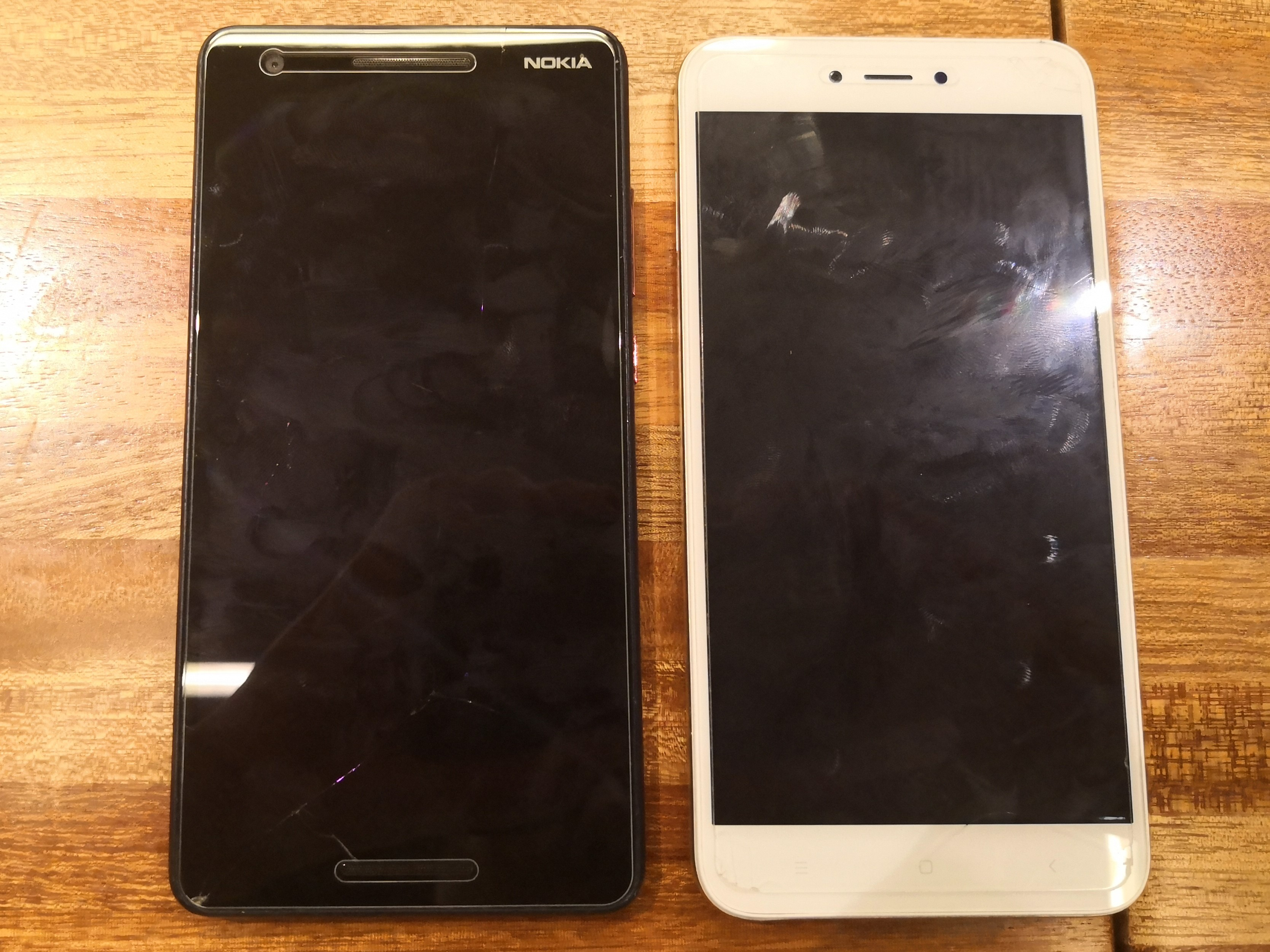
Front side of Nokia 2.1 (left) and Redmi Note 5A (right)

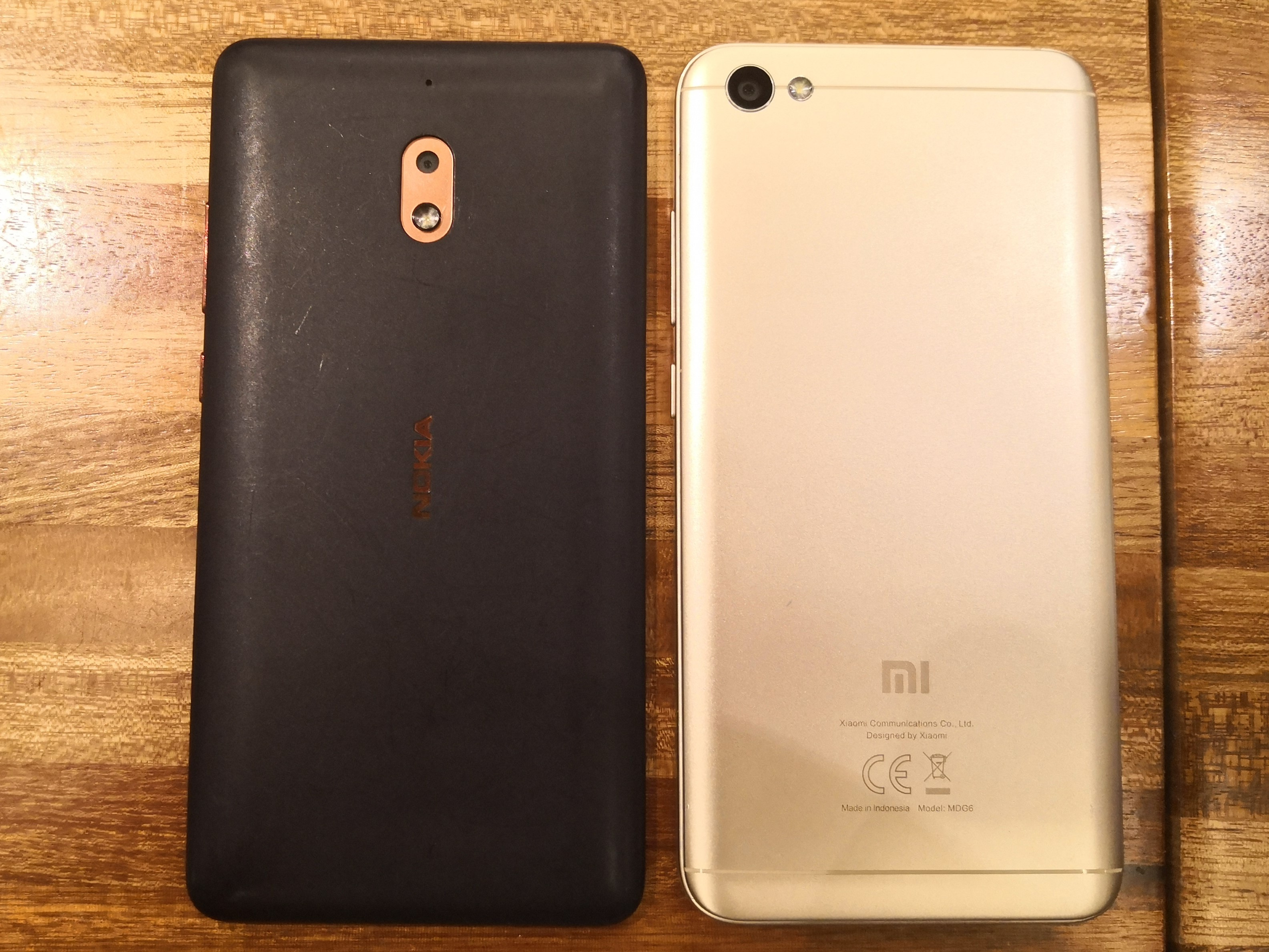
Back side of Nokia 2.1 (left) and Redmi Note 5A (right)

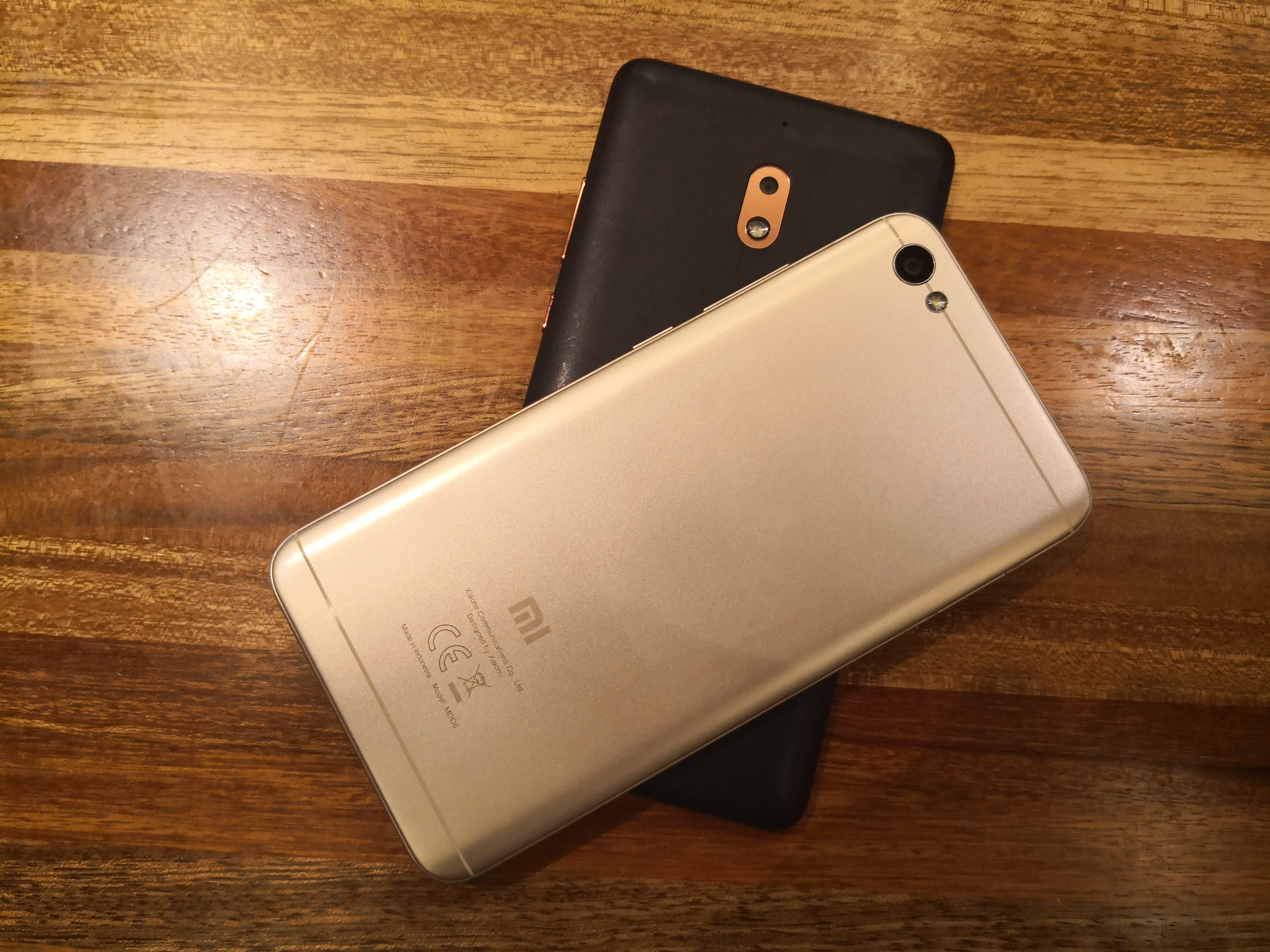
Back side of Nokia 2.1 (lower) and Redmi Note 5A (upper)

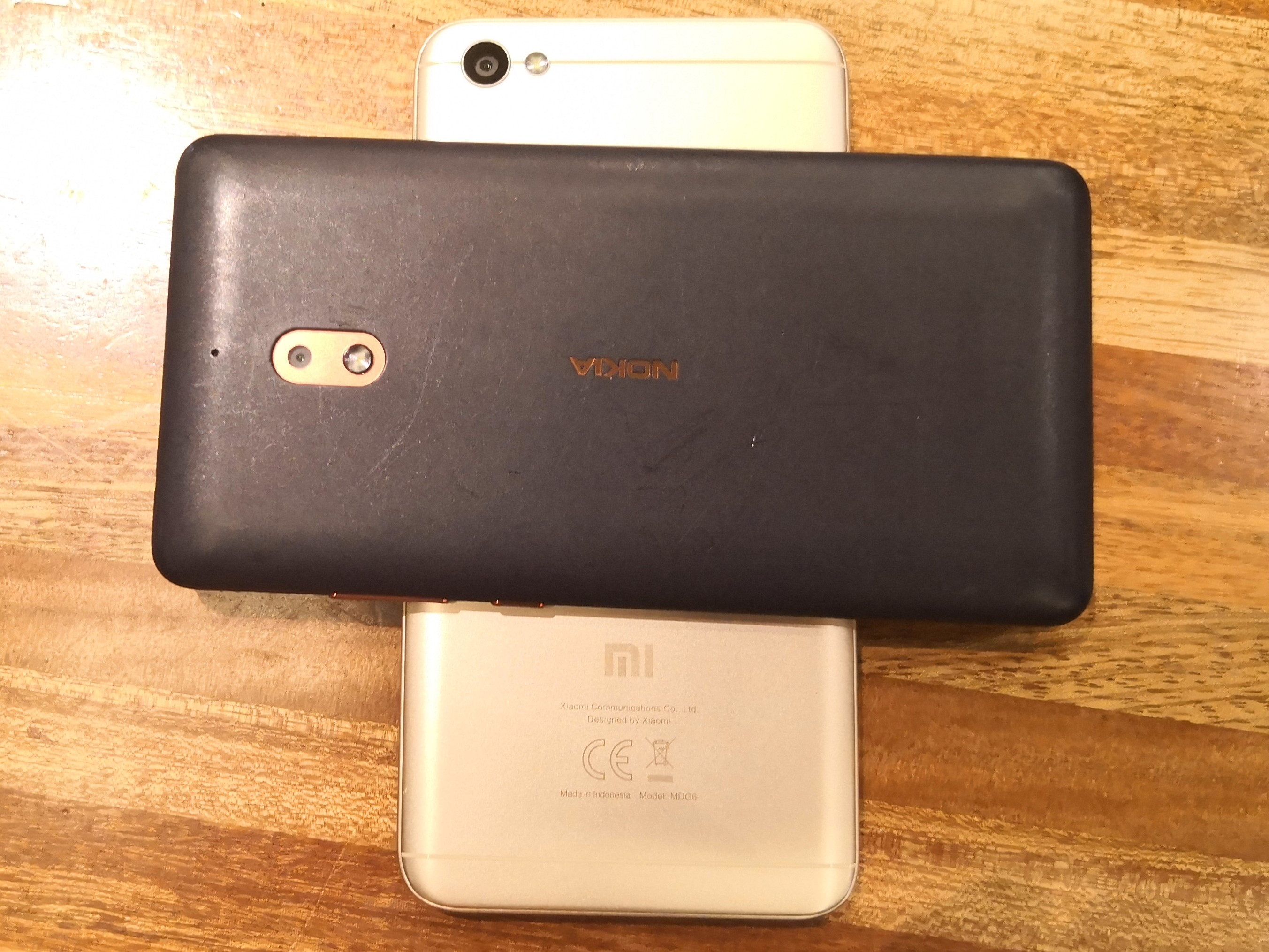
Back side of Nokia 2.1 (upper) and Redmi Note 5A (lower)

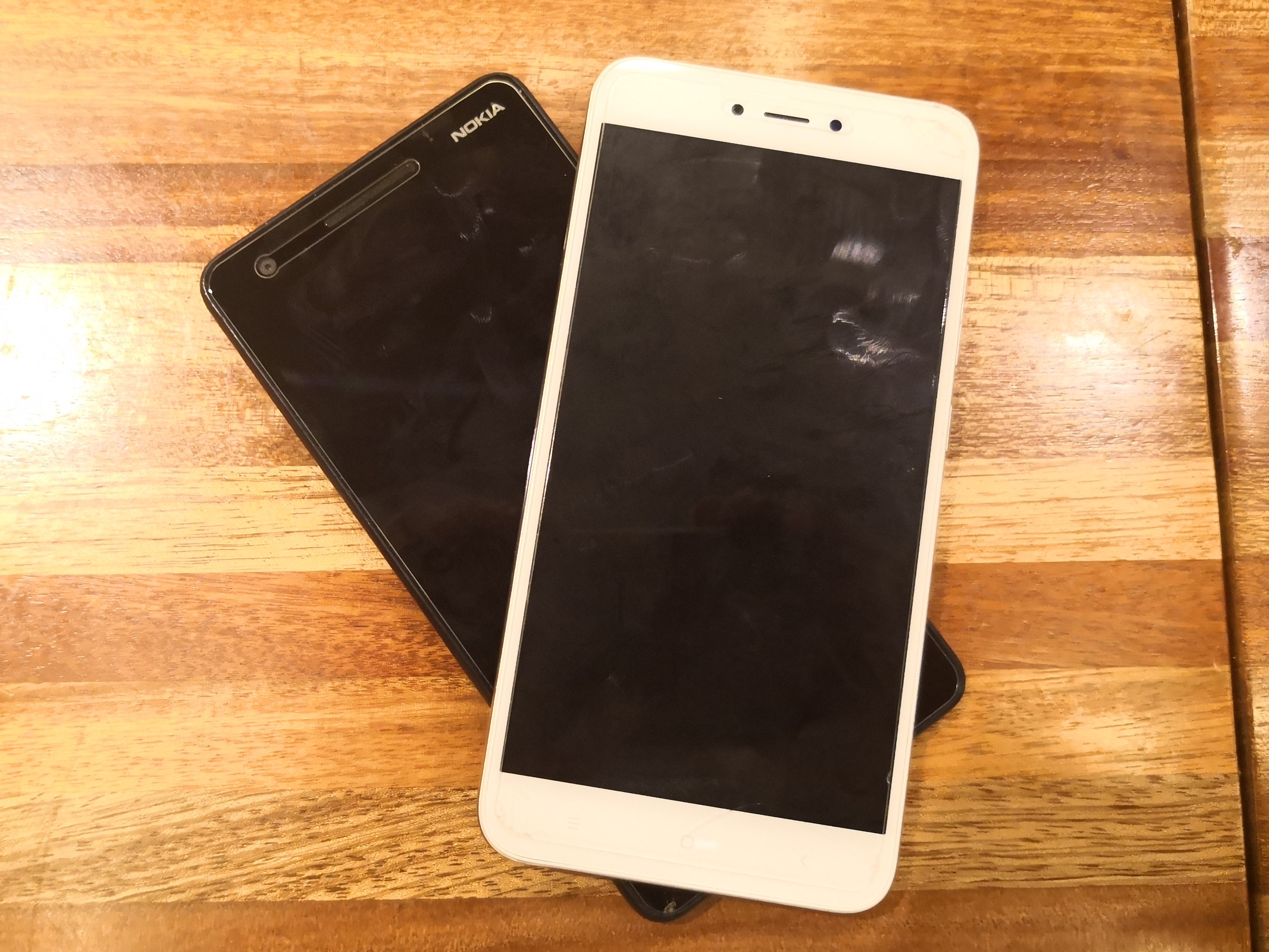
Front side of Nokia 2.1 (lower) and Redmi Note 5A (upper)
