= Redmi 5 =

2017 and 2018 Android Smartphones manufactured by Xiaomi

Xiaomi Redmi 5 Xiaomi Redmi 5 Plus (Redmi Note 5 in India)
- Manufacturer: Xiaomi
- Type: Redmi 5: smartphone Redmi 5 Plus: phablet
- Series: Redmi
- First released: December 2017; 8 years ago
- Predecessor: Redmi 4 Redmi 4X
- Successor: Redmi 6 Redmi 6 Pro
- Related: Redmi 5A; Redmi Note 5
- Compatible networks: 2G, 3G, 4G, 4G LTE
- Form factor: Slate
- Dimensions: Redmi 5 Plus: H: 158.5 mm (6.24 in); W: 75.5 mm (2.97 in); D: 8.1 mm (0.32 in)
- Weight: Redmi 5 Plus: 180 g (6.3 oz)
- Operating system: Original: Android 7.1.2 "Nougat" with MIUI 9 Current: Android 8.1 "Oreo" with MIUI 11
- System-on-chip: Redmi 5: Snapdragon 450; Redmi 5 Plus: Snapdragon 625
- CPU: Redmi 5: Octa-core 1.8 GHz Cortex-A53; Redmi 5 Plus: Octa-core 2.0 GHz Cortex-A53
- GPU: Adreno 506
- Memory: Redmi 5: 2 or 3 GB; Redmi 5 Plus: 3 or 4 GB
- Storage: Redmi 5: 16 or 32 GB; Redmi 5 Plus: 32 or 64 GB
- Removable storage: microSDXC, microSDHC, microSD, up to 128 GB
- Battery: Non-removable Li-Po; Redmi 5: 3300 mAh; Redmi 5 Plus: 4000 mAh
- Rear camera: 12 MP (f/2.2, 1.25 μm), phase detection autofocus, dual-LED dual-tone flash(only Redmi 5 Plus), Geo-tagging, touch focus, face detection, panorama, HDR
- Front camera: 5 MP
- Display: Redmi 5: 5.7" 1440 × 720 pixels,18:9 ratio, IPS LCD capacitive touchscreen, 16M colors Redmi 5 Plus: 5.99", 1080 x 2160 pixels, 18:9 ratio (403 ppi), IPS LCD capacitive touchscreen, 16M colors
- Connectivity: Wi-Fi 802.11a/b/g/n/ac (2.4 & 5GHz)(ac band only available on 5 Plus), dual-band, WiFi Direct, Bluetooth v4.2
- Codename: Redmi 5: rosy Redmi 5 Plus: vince

The Redmi 5 and Redmi 5 Plus are Android smartphones developed by Xiaomi Inc, announced on 7 December 2017. They are part of Xiaomi's budget Redmi smartphone line. The Redmi 5 Plus has been rebranded as the Redmi Note 5 for the Indian market.

== Specifications ==
=== Hardware ===
The Redmi 5 runs on the Snapdragon 450 processor, and the Plus variant runs on Snapdragon 625. Redmi 5 has a 5.7-inch HD+ display, while the Plus comes with 5.99-inch Full HD+ one, both have an 18:9 aspect ratio. The devices look very similar from the front, the main difference being their size. On the Redmi 5 Plus, the 5-megapixel front camera is to the right of the earpiece while the flash, with color temperature 4500K, is to the left. On the back, the 12 MP camera sensor is right above the fingerprint sensor. The look of the phones at the back is similar to the Redmi Note 4. Both the Redmi 5 and Redmi 5 Plus rear camera, unlike the Redmi Note 4's, protrudes slightly from the back.

Redmi 5 Plus has 3 GB or 4 GB of RAM and 32 GB or 64 GB of storage, and Redmi 5 has 2 GB or 3 GB of RAM and 16 GB or 32 GB of storage. Storage of both can be expanded by fitting a microSDXC card.

=== Software ===
The Redmi 5 and Redmi 5 Plus were released with MIUI 9, which is based on Android 7.1.2 "Nougat". Later, the smartphones were updated to MIUI 11 based on Android 8.1 "Oreo".

== Reception ==
Redmi 5 Plus received mostly positive reviews. NDTV Gadgets 360 rated the phone at 8/10, describing it as a good all-rounder and value for money. Android Authority rated the phone at 8.5/10 and called it a well-rounded package. The phones have been criticised for lack of NFC support, microUSB port, and the camera bump.

== Sales ==
Redmi 5 and 5 Plus went on sale in the EU in January 2018 and were priced €170 and €215 respectively.

On 22 February 2018, in the first sale of the phone, the Indian division of Xiaomi claimed to have sold more than 300,000 Redmi Note 5 (Redmi 5 Plus) and Redmi Note 5 Pro units in India in less than three minutes, and called it the biggest sale in the Indian history of smartphones.
