= Redmi 3 =

Smartphone model

Xiaomi Redmi 3 Xiaomi Redmi 3S
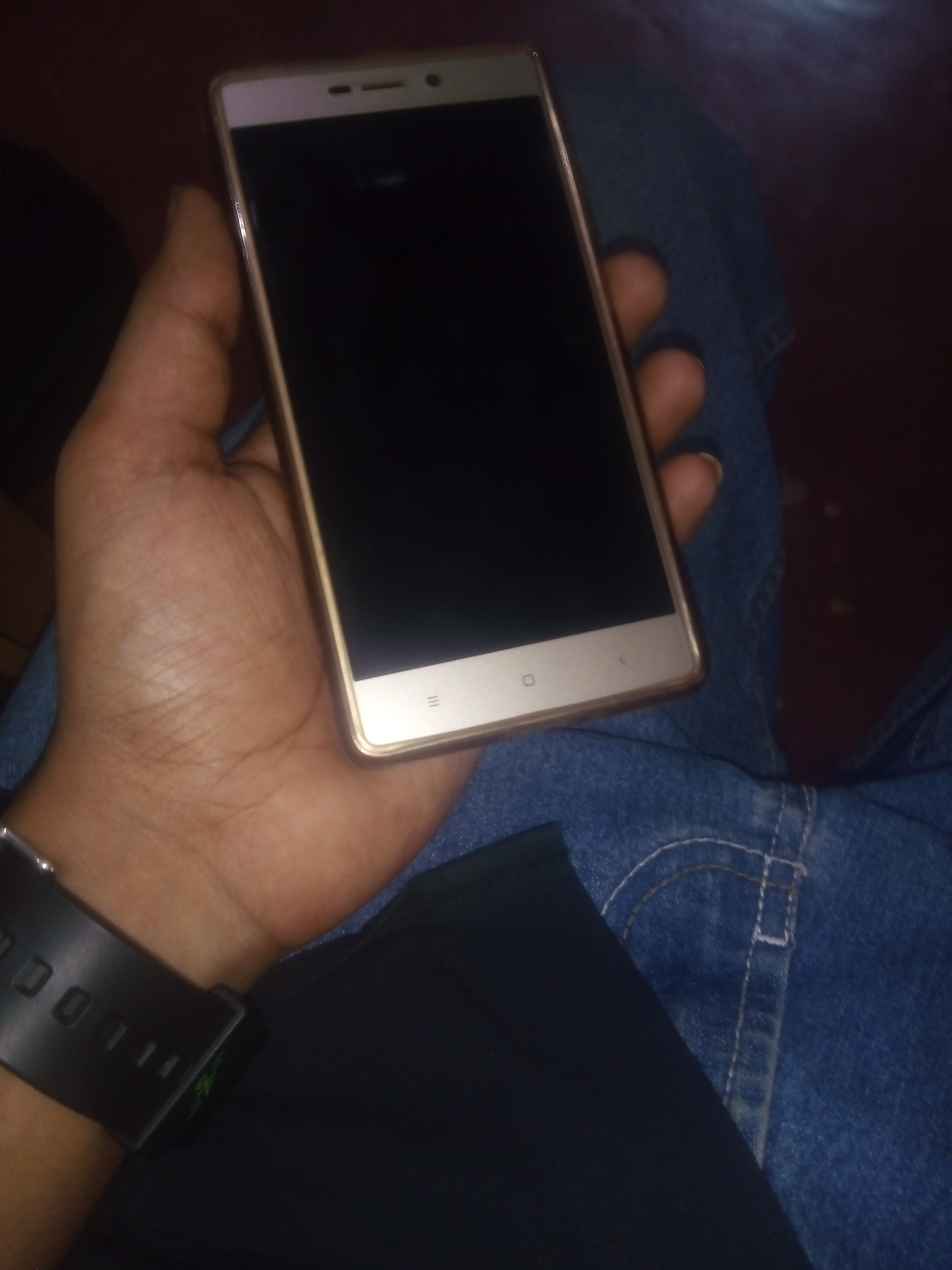
- Developer: Xiaomi Inc.
- Manufacturer: Xiaomi
- Type: Touchscreen smartphone
- Series: Redmi
- First released: Redmi 3: January 2016; 10 years ago Redmi 3S: June 2016; 10 years ago
- Predecessor: Redmi 2
- Successor: Redmi 3S; Redmi 4
- Form factor: Smartphone
- Dimensions: H: 139.3 mm (5.48 in); W: 69.6 mm (2.74 in); D: 8.5 mm (0.33 in)
- Weight: 144 g (5.1 oz)
- Operating system: Redmi 3: Original: MIUI 7 based on Android 5.1.1; Current: MIUI 9.6 based on Android 5.1.1; Redmi 3S: Original: MIUI 7 based on Android 6.0.1; Current: MIUI 10.2 based on Android 6.0.1
- CPU: Redmi 3: Snapdragon 616, Octa-core 1.2 GHz Cortex-A53; Redmi 3S: Snapdragon 430, Octa-core 1.4 GHz Cortex-A53
- GPU: Redmi 3: Adreno 405; Redmi 3S: Adreno 505
- Memory: Redmi 3: 2 GB; Redmi 3S: 2 or 3 GB
- Storage: Redmi 3: 16 GB; Redmi 3S: 16 or 32 GB
- Removable storage: microSDXC, microSDHC, microSD, up to 256 GB
- SIM: Dual SIM nanoSIM
- Battery: Non-removable Li-Po; 4100 mAh
- Charging: MicroUSB
- Rear camera: 13 MP (f/2.0), phase detection autofocus, panorama, HDR
- Front camera: 5 MP (f/2.2)
- Display: 5.0"; 1280 × 720 pixels, 16:9 ratio IPS LCD capacitive touchscreen, 16M colors
- Connectivity: 2G, 3G, 4G, 4G LTE, Wi-Fi 802.11 b/g/n (2.4 GHz), WiFi Direct, Hotspot, Bluetooth v4.1
- Codename: ido

Redmi 3 is an Android smartphone manufactured by Xiaomi released in January 2016. It has a 5-inch HD IPS LCD (294 ppi density), and is powered by Qualcomm's Snapdragon 1.2GHz octa-core Qualcomm Snapdragon 616 processor, paired with 2GB of RAM. It runs on the Android operating system and is equipped with a non-removable 4100mAh battery.

It had a 13-megapixel primary camera, with a 5-megapixel front camera. The device came with MIUI 7, which is based on Android, and has an internal storage capacity of 16GB, which could be expanded via a microSD card up to 128GB. It supported dual-SIM with one Micro-SIM slot and the other as Nano-SIM slot.

It measured 139.30 x 69.60 x 8.50mm (height x width x thickness). The device offered several connectivity options, such as Wi-Fi 802.11 b/g/n, GPS, Bluetooth v4.10, Infrared, USB OTG, FM radio, Wi-Fi Direct, 3G, and 4G. Additionally, it was also equipped with several sensors, including an accelerometer, ambient light sensor, gyroscope, proximity sensor, and compass/magnetometer.

The Xiaomi Redmi 3 was later succeeded by its successor, the Redmi 3S.
