= Redmi =

Chinese smartphone brand and subsidiary of Xiaomi Corporation

- Current logo of Redmi since 2025
- Native name: 红米
- Type: Subsidiary
- Founded: July 2013; 13 years ago (as Xiaomi Redmi series); 10 January 2019; 7 years ago (subsidiary of Xiaomi)
- Products: Smartphones; Power banks Laptops; Smart TVs; Wireless Earbuds; Smartwatches
- Parent: Xiaomi
- Website: mi.com

Former Redmi logo used until November 2024 in China and until March 2025 on the global market

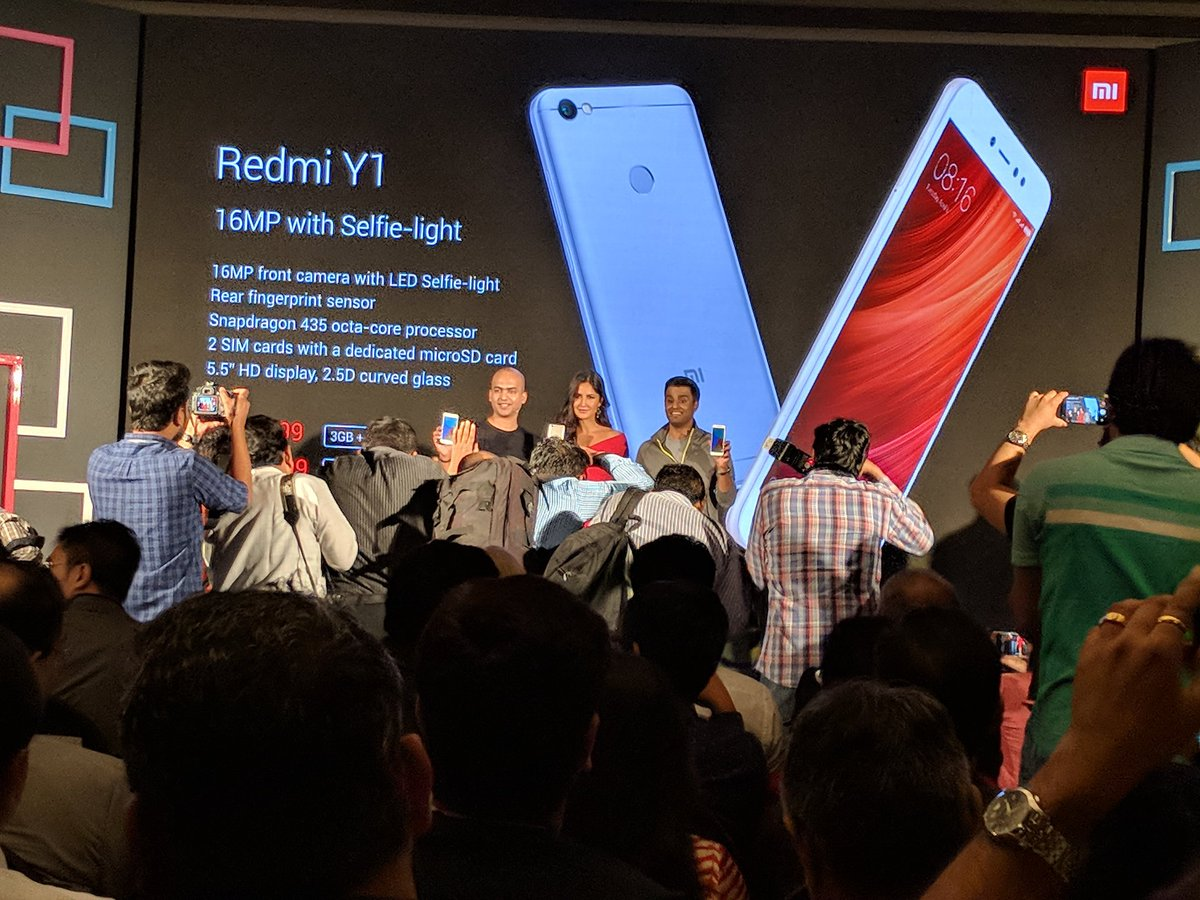
Manu Kumar Jain, VP and MD of Xiaomi India (left), Katrina Kaif (middle) at Redmi Y1 promotional event

Redmi (stylized in all caps) is a subsidiary brand owned by Chinese electronics company Xiaomi. It was first launched in July 2013 as a budget smartphone line, and became a separate sub-brand of Xiaomi in 2019 to take over entry-level and mid-range devices originally produced by Xiaomi brand, while Xiaomi itself produces upper-range and flagship Xiaomi (formerly Mi) phones.

Redmi phones use Xiaomi's MIUI (2014–2023) and Xiaomi HyperOS (2023–present) user interface on top of Android. Models are divided into the entry-level Redmi, the mid-range Redmi Note, and the high-end Redmi K. In 2022, an ultra-basic entry-level lineup, Redmi A was introduced, with some models featuring Android Go and lacking MIUI/HyperOS user interface. The Redmi K is exclusive to China and rebranded as Poco (another Xiaomi subsidiary) for select global markets.

The most significant difference from other Xiaomi smartphones is that Redmi uses less expensive components, allowing lower prices while retaining more advanced specifications. In August 2014, The Wall Street Journal reported that in the second quarter of the 2014 fiscal year, Xiaomi had a smartphone market share of 14% in China; Redmi sales were attributed as a contributing factor toward this ranking.

Some devices with identical specification are released in some markets as POCO, in others as Redmi; for example the Poco X7 and Redmi Note 14 Pro 5G. Redmi Note 14 SE officially arrived in India on 28 July 2025.

== History ==
=== 2013 ===
The first Redmi phone Redmi (Red Rice in Mandarin), released in China in 2013, was first launched on Xiaomi's website, with consumer sales beginning on 12 July 2013. The phone was internationally released under the Redmi brand in early 2014.

=== 2014 ===
On 13 March 2014, Redmi announced that their phones had been sold out in Singapore alone, eight minutes after being made available to buy on Xiaomi's website. Criticism regarding the release of Redmi phones included the notion that the firm may be exaggerating its sales by releasing them in small batches, causing them to quickly sell out.

On 4 August, The Wall Street Journal reported that in China's smartphone market, Xiaomi overtook Samsung in the second quarter of the 2014 fiscal year with a 14% market share in smartphone shipment rankings, while Samsung had a 12% market share during this time. Yulong and Lenovo both had a 12% market share during this time. Redmi sales were attributed as contributing to Xiaomi's increased shipment rankings in the smartphone market. Conversely, in the first quarter of 2014, Xiaomi held a 10.7% market share.

=== 2015 ===
The Redmi Note 3 launched on 24 November 2015; unlike its predecessor, it does not have a user-changeable battery or microSD slot. It uses the MediaTek Helio X10 Octa-core 2.0 GHz Cortex-A53 SOC with the PowerVR G6200 GPU. The Snapdragon variant of the phone, released later the same year, is based on the Snapdragon 650 and has microSD support.

=== 2016 ===
In July 2016, the actors Liu Shishi, Wu Xiubo and Liu Haoran became the first ambassadors of the Redmi series in China. Redmi Pro has appeared as Pro lineup in Redmi series.

On 25 August, Xiaomi unveiled the Redmi Note 4, powered by MediaTek's Helio X20 deca-core processor clocked at 2.1 GHz. The device has 2 GB RAM and 16 GB of internal storage. It has a 5.5-inch Full-HD display and a 13 MP rear camera and 5 MP front camera. It runs on Android 6.0 Marshmallow and is powered by a 4,100 mAh battery.

In November, Xiaomi released its new budget phone, Redmi 4. It has a polycarbonate body, dual-SIM support and runs on MIUI 8 based on Android 6.0.1 Marshmallow. The Redmi 4 has a 5-inch 720x1280 pixels display, is powered by a 1.4 GHz octa-core processor, and has 2 GB of RAM.

=== 2017 ===
In January 2017, the Xiaomi Redmi Note 4x based on Qualcomm Snapdragon 625 Chipset became the company's first major launch of 2017. It is an upgraded version of the previously released Redmi Note 4 based on the MediaTek Helio X20 chipset. The device is known as Redmi Note 4 in regions where the original Redmi Note 4 was not released.

In December, Xiaomi unveiled the Redmi 5 and 5 Plus. They are the first phones in the Redmi series with an 18:9 screen aspect ratio. The EU release was set to January 2018 and prices were set to €170 for the Redmi 5 and €215 for the Redmi 5 Plus.

=== 2018 ===
In February 2018, Xiaomi unveiled the Redmi Note 5 and Note 5 Pro. They are the first phones from Xiaomi to feature facial recognition.

In May, Xiaomi unveiled the Redmi S2, also known as Redmi Y2 for Indian markets.

In June, Xiaomi unveiled the Redmi 6, 6A and 6 Pro. The Redmi 6 Pro is the first phone in the Redmi series with a notch similar to the iPhone X and a 19:9 screen aspect ratio.

In September, Xiaomi unveiled the Redmi Note 6 Pro. It is the first phone in the Redmi series with four cameras (two cameras on the front and two cameras on the back) and constructed using 6000 series aluminium.

=== 2019 ===
In January 2019, Xiaomi officially announced Redmi to be a separate sub-brand, distinct from Xiaomi.

On 10 January 2019, Redmi unveiled the Redmi Note 7 and Note 7 Pro, the first phones in the Redmi series with a 48-megapixel rear camera. The Note 7 has a Samsung GM1 image sensor, and the Note 7 Pro has a Sony IMX586 48 MP image sensor. The Note 7 is powered by the Qualcomm Snapdragon 660 Octa-Core Processor clocked at 2.2 GHz, and the Note 7 Pro has an 11 nm Qualcomm Snapdragon 675 Octa-Core Processor clocked at 2.0 GHz. The Note 7 is available with 3 GB RAM with 32 GB storage, 4 GB RAM with 64 GB storage and 6 GB RAM with 64 GB storage. It has a 4,000 mAh battery with Quick Charge 4.0. The Redmi Note 7 series of smartphones is one of the best-selling Redmi phones; over 20 million devices were sold in the 7 months from their introduction.

The Redmi K20 and K20 Pro (also marketed as the Mi 9T) are Redmi's first foray into the flagship market. The phone was launched along with the Redmi 7A in China on 28 May. The K20 Pro is powered by the flagship Snapdragon 855 processor while the K20 is powered by the newly released Snapdragon 730 and Redmi 7A is a less expensive phone with Snapdragon 439. Redmi Note 8 and Note 8 Pro were launched on 29 August, and Redmi 8 and 8A were announced in October 2019.

After emerging as a sub-brand of Xiaomi, Redmi employed the same Smartphone & AIoT dual core strategy as Xiaomi, and branched out to different product categories such as smart TVs, notebook PCs. Xiaomi also forayed into home appliances such as washing machine, and products such as luggage.

=== 2020 ===
On 7 January, Redmi unveiled the Redmi K30 5G, it being Redmi's first 5G handset available in the market. The K30 is powered by the flagship Snapdragon 765G, an Octa-Core Processor clocked at 2.4 GHz. The K30 features a LCD punchhole camera cutout with 120 Hz refresh rate.

In March, the Redmi Note 9 Pro and Redmi Note 9 Pro Max were launched in India. Both handset models is powered by the Snapdragon 720G, an Octa-core Processor clocked at 2.3 GHz. The Redmi Note 9 Pro features a 48 MP quad camera rear setup and 18 W fast charge, while the Redmi Note 9 Pro Max features a 64 MP quad camera rear setup and 33 W fast charge. In the same month, Redmi introduced the Redmi Note 9S to the global market, rebranded from the Indian Redmi Note 9 Pro, both featuring identical design and specifications. Redmi introduced the Indian Redmi Note 9 Pro Max rebranded as the Redmi Note 9 Pro to the global market in May, both featuring identical design and specifications.

24 March saw the launch of the Redmi K30 Pro. The K30 Pro has a Sony IMX686 64 MP sensor. It is powered by the flagship Snapdragon 865, an Octa-Core Processor clocked at 2.84 GHz, and available with 6 GB LPDDR4X RAM with 128 GB UFS 3.0 storage, 8 GB LPDDR5 RAM with 128 GB UFS 3.1 storage or 8 GB LPDDR5 RAM with 256 GB UFS 3.1 storage.

Redmi introduced a massive 98" Redmi TV MAX at a price of RMB 19,999 which undercuts the massive screen LCD TV market.

On 26 May, Redmi unveiled the Redmi 10X Series, featuring the Redmi 10X Pro 5G, Redmi 10X 5G and Redmi 10X 4G. Both the Redmi 10X Pro 5G and Redmi 10X 5G features the MediaTek Dimensity 820, a 7 nm Octa-core Processor clocked at 2.6 GHz. Redmi 10X 4G features the MediaTek Helio G85, clocked at 2.4 GHz. Along with the introduction of the Redmi 10X Series, Redmi also introduced the Redmi TV X-series, offering big-screen TV at excellent value. Redmi also unveiled a range of notebook PCs featuring Ryzen on the same day.

=== 2021 ===
In Q2 of 2021, the company overtook Apple as the second-largest smartphone brand globally, and it beat Samsung as the largest phone manufacturer in Europe.

=== 2022 ===
The Redmi A1 with stock Android was launched on 6 September 2022.

=== 2023 ===
In 2023, Xiaomi launched Redmi's new lineup, the Redmi Note 12 series, globally on 23 March 2023. The series has three variants: Redmi Note 12, Redmi Note 12 Pro and Redmi Note 12 Pro+. It was the first time that a Redmi smartphone featured a 200 MP camera and came with fast 120 W charging (on Redmi Note 12 Pro+). All devices came with MIUI 13 based on Android 12, later receiving an update for MIUI 14 based on Android 13. Xiaomi later also released another variant to the series, the Redmi Note 12 Turbo, on 28 March, which features the Snapdragon 7+ Gen2 processor. In November 2023, it launched the Redmi 13C and Redmi Note 13 series in China.

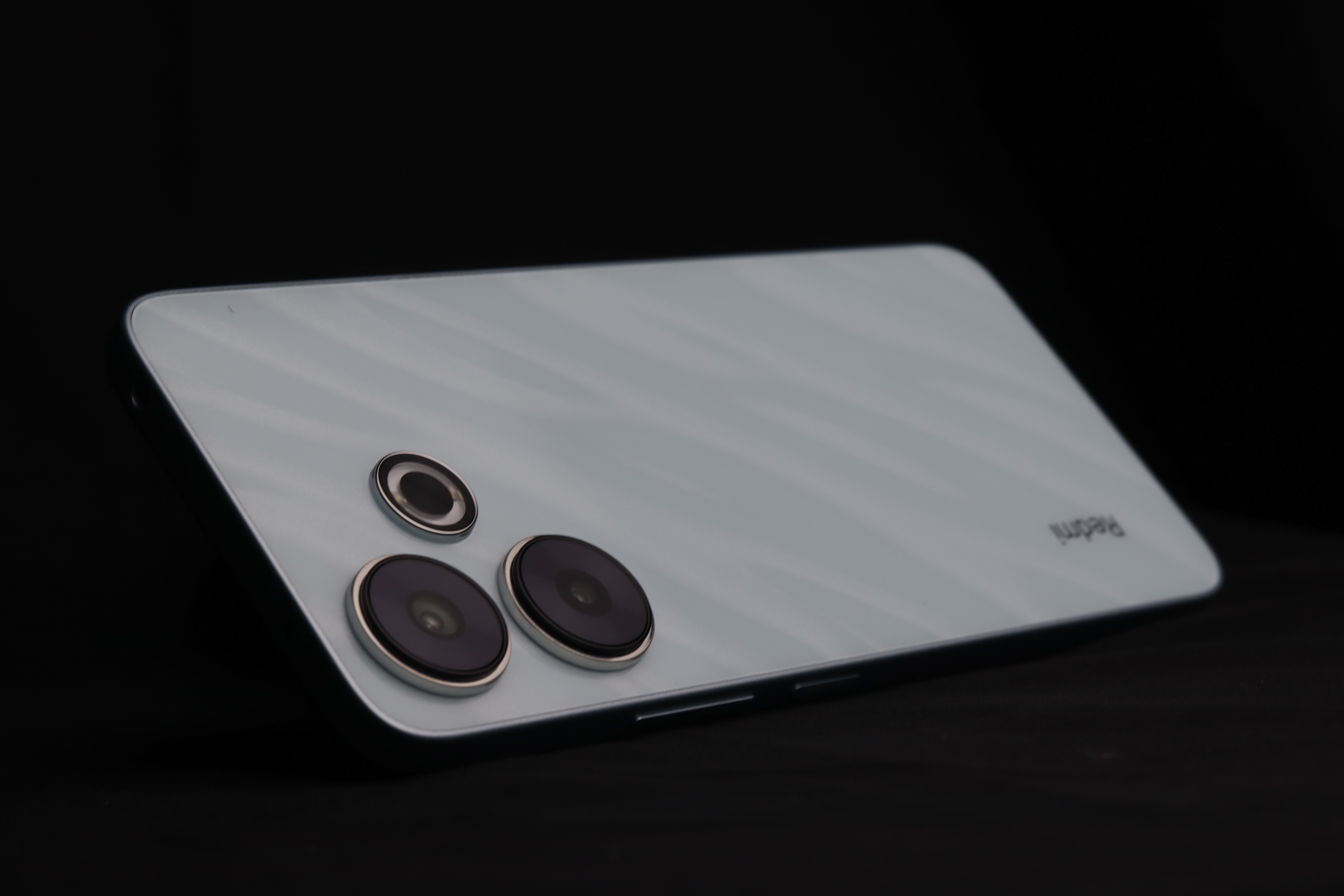
Backview of Redmi 13 (Ocean Blue)

=== 2024 ===
The Redmi Note 13 series was launched globally on 4 January 2024. There were 5 variants available – Redmi Note 13, Note 13 Pro, Note 13 5G, Note 13 Pro 5G, and Redmi Note 13 Pro+. All five devices came out with MIUI 14 based on Android 13, with an available now upgrade to HyperOS, Xiaomi's UI revamp.

In November 2024, the Chinese table tennis player Fan Zhendong became the champion ambassador of the REDMI brand in China. REDMI K80 series was released on 27 November, with sales exceeding 660,000 units on the first day, breaking the first sales record of the REDMI K series.

== Phone firmware ==
Most Android phones, including Redmi and others by Xiaomi, have firmware (operativity which can be updated to modify features, add functionality, correct errors, and update security). Firmware updates can often be carried out automatically ("over the air", OTA), and updated versions can be downloaded and installed. Model-specific alternative firmware from independent developers, claiming advantages over stock firmware, is available for many phones; one example is LineageOS, which supports several Xiaomi phones. The Xiaomi European Community, in particular, provides firmware based on Xiaomi HyperOS for many Xiaomi models, working with Xiaomi, based on heavily modified firmware for the relevant Chinese model, claiming many advantages.

== See also ==
- List of Redmi products
- Redmi (phone)
