= Oppo A73s =

Android smartphone

Oppo A73s (Oppo F7 Youth) realme 1
- Brand: OPPO; Realme
- Type: Smartphone
- Series: Oppo A/F realme (India only)
- First released: realme 1: May 15, 2018; 8 years ago F7 Youth: May 25, 2018; 8 years ago A73s: June 20, 2018; 8 years ago
- Predecessor: Oppo A73/F5 Youth
- Successor: realme 2
- Related: Oppo F7
- Compatible networks: GSM, 3G, 4G (LTE)
- Form factor: Slate
- Dimensions: 156.5×75.2×7.8 mm (6.16×2.96×0.31 in)
- Weight: 155 g (5 oz)
- Operating system: Initial: Android 8.1 Oreo + ColorOS 5.2; Current: Android 9 Pie + ColorOS 6
- System-on-chip: MediaTek MT6771 Helio P60 (12 nm)
- CPU: Octa-core (4×2 GHz Cortex-A73 & 4×2 GHz Cortex-A53)
- GPU: Mali-G72 MP3
- Memory: A73s: 4 GB realme 1: 3/4/6 GB; LPDDR4X
- Storage: A73s: 64 GB realme 1: 32/64/128 GB eMMC 5.1
- Removable storage: MicroSDXC up to 256 GB
- Battery: Non-removable, Li-Ion 3410 mAh
- Rear camera: 13 MP, f/2.2, PDAF; LED flash, HDR, panorama Video: 1080p@30fps
- Front camera: 8 MP, f/2.2 Video: 1080p@30fps
- Display: IPS LCD, 6", 2160 × 1080 (FHD+), 18:9, 402 ppi
- Connectivity: MicroUSB 2.0, 3.5 mm audio jack, Bluetooth 4.2 (A2DP, LE), Wi-Fi 802.11 b/g/n (Wi-Fi Direct, hotspot), GPS, A-GPS
- Data inputs: Proximity sensor, accelerometer, gyroscope, compass

The Oppo A73s is an Android smartphone developed by OPPO, part of the A series and the successor to the Oppo A73. It was announced on June 20, 2018.

In some countries, the smartphone was sold under the name Oppo F7 Youth. Additionally, on May 15, 2018, the realme 1 was introduced, which is a rebranded version of the Oppo A73s under the new Realme brand for the Indian market.

== Specifications ==
=== Design ===
The screen is made of Corning Gorilla Glass 3 and the body is made of plastic.

At the bottom, there is a MicroUSB port, a speaker, 2 microphones, and a 3.5 mm audio jack. On the left side are the volume buttons. On the right side are the power button and a slot for 2 SIM cards and a MicroSD memory card up to 256 GB.

The Oppo A73s was sold in 2 colors: Diamond Black and Solar Red. In India, the realme 1 was sold in 3 colors: Diamond Black, Solar Red, and Moonlight Silver.

=== Hardware ===
The smartphone is powered by a MediaTek Helio P60 processor and a Mali-G72 MP3 GPU. The battery has a capacity of 3410 mAh.

The A73s features a 6-inch IPS LCD display with Full HD+ (2160 × 1080, 402 ppi) and an 18:9 aspect ratio. The Oppo A73s was sold in a 4/64 GB configuration, while the realme 1 was available in 3/32, 4/64, and 6/128 GB variants.

=== Cameras ===
The smartphone features a 13 MP main camera with an aperture of f/2.2, phase-detection autofocus, and the ability to record video in 1080p resolution at 30fps. The front camera has a resolution of 8 MP with an aperture of f/2.2 and video recording capability at 1080p at 30fps.

=== Software ===
The smartphone was released with ColorOS 5.2 based on Android 8.1 Oreo and was updated to ColorOS 6 based on Android 9 Pie.
