= Oppo A5 =

2018 Android smartphones developed by OPPO

Oppo A5/AX5 realme 2
- Brand: OPPO, realme
- Type: Smartphone
- Series: Oppo A / realme
- First released: A5: July 7, 2018; 8 years ago realme 2: August 28, 2018; 8 years ago
- Predecessor: realme 1
- Successor: Oppo A5 2020 realme 3
- Related: Oppo A5s realme 2 Pro realme C1
- Compatible networks: GSM, 3G, 4G (LTE)
- Form factor: Slate
- Colors: A5/A5X: Blue, Pink, Red realme 2: Diamond Black, Diamond Red, Diamond Blue
- Dimensions: 156.2×75.6×8.2 mm (6.15×2.98×0.32 in)
- Weight: 168 g (6 oz)
- Operating system: Initial: Android 8.1 Oreo + ColorOS 5.1; Current: Android 9 Pie + ColorOS 6
- CPU: Qualcomm Snapdragon 450 (14 nm), 4×1.8 GHz Cortex-A53
- GPU: Adreno 506
- Memory: 3/4 GB LPDDR3
- Storage: 32/64 GB eMMC 5.1
- Removable storage: microSDXC up to 256 GB
- Battery: Non-removable Li-Ion 4230 mAh
- Rear camera: 13 MP, f/2.2, AF + 2 MP, f/2.4 (depth sensor); LED flash, HDR, panorama Video: 1080p@30fps
- Front camera: 8 MP, f/2.2, 1/4.0", 1.12 µm HDR; Video: 1080p@30fps
- Display: IPS LCD, 6.2", 1520 × 720 (HD+), 19:9, 271 ppi
- Connectivity: microUSB 2.0, 3.5 mm audio jack, Bluetooth 4.2 (A2DP, LE), FM radio, Wi-Fi 802.11 b/g/n (Wi-Fi Direct, hotspot), GPS, A-GPS, GLONASS (A5)
- Other: Rear-mounted fingerprint sensor (only on realme 2 and Indian A5), proximity sensor, accelerometer, compass

The Oppo A5 (also known as the Oppo AX5) is an Android smartphone manufactured by OPPO Electronics, part of Oppo's lineup of the А series announced on July 7, 2018. On August 28, 2018, the realme 2 was announced under the brand Realme.

The Oppo A5 was launched in China, and sales went available on July 13, 2018, starting at 1,300 CNY along with Pakistan. Availability in India for the Oppo A5 was in August 2018.

== Specifications ==
=== Design & Hardware ===
The back and the frame is made of plastic. It was available at 3 color options depending on the model:

- Oppo A5/AX5 - Blue, Pink, Red
- Realme 2 - Diamond Black, Diamond Red, Diamond Blue

In the front, it comes with a 6.2" IPS LCD with a resolution of 720 × 1520 px (HD+, 19:9) with Corning Gorilla Glass 3 screen protection.

Both smartphones were powered by the Snapdragon 450 chipset with 8x Cortex-A53 central processors clocked at 1.8 GHz and Adreno 506 GPU. The battery comes with a capacity of 4230 mAh. The configurations of interal memory comes with 32GB 3GB RAM, 32GB 4GB RAM, 64GB 3GB RAM, 64GB and 4GB RAM for the A5/AX5, while the realme 2 comes with 32GB 3GB RAM and 64GB 4GB RAM configurations.

Both smartphones features a dual camera of 13MP (f/2.2) and 2MP depth sensor (f/2.4). In the front, it features an 8MP (f/2.2) front camera. Both the main and front can record up to 1080p at 30fps. It also features Oppo's AI Beauty 2.0 enhancement for the front camera.

=== Software ===
The smartphone was released on ColorOS 5.1, which is based on Android 8.1 Oreo. It was updated to ColorOS 6 based on Android 9 Pie.
