= Oppo A58 =

2023 Android smartphone from Oppo

Oppo A58 CPH2577
- Also known as: Oppo A58 4G
- Brand: OPPO
- Type: Phablet
- Series: A
- First released: July 26, 2023; 2 years ago
- Predecessor: Oppo A57 (2022)
- Successor: Oppo A60
- Related: Oppo A18; Oppo A58 5G; Oppo A78; Oppo A98
- Compatible networks: List: Technology: GSM / HSPA / LTE; 2G bands: GSM 850 / 900 / 1800 / 1900; 3G bands: HSDPA 900 / 2100; 4G bands (LTE): 1, 3, 5, 7, 8, 20, 28, 38, 40, 41; Speed: HSPA, LTE
- Form factor: Slate
- Colors: Glowing Black, Dazzling Green
- Dimensions: 165.65×75.98×7.99 mm (6.522×2.991×0.315 in)
- Weight: 192 g (7 oz)
- Operating system: Initial: Android 13 with ColorOS 13.1; Current: Android 15 with ColorOS 15
- System-on-chip: MediaTek Helio G85 (12 nm)
- CPU: Octa-core (2×2 GHz Cortex-A75 & 6×1.8 GHz Cortex-A55)
- GPU: Mali-G52 MC2
- Memory: 6/8 GB LPDDR4X
- Storage: 128/256 GB eMMC 5.1
- Removable storage: microSDXC up to 1 TB
- SIM: Dual SIM (Nano-SIM)
- Battery: Non-removable Li-Po 5000 mAh
- Charging: 33W SUPERVOOC fast charging
- Rear camera: 50 MP, f/1.8, 75.5° (wide), PDAF + 2 MP, f/2.4, 89.1° (depth); LED flash, HDR, panorama Video: 1080p@30fps
- Front camera: 8 MP, f/2.0, 80° (wide); HDR, panorama Video: 1080p@30fps
- Display: 6.72" IPS LCD, 2400 × 1080 (FHD+), 20:9 ratio, 392 ppi
- Sound: Stereo speakers, 3.5mm audio jack
- Connectivity: USB-C 2.0, 3.5 mm jack, Bluetooth 5.3 (A2DP, LE, aptXHD), NFC, Wi-Fi 802.11 a/b/g/n/ac (dual-band), GPS, GLONASS, Galileo, BeiDou, QZSS
- Data inputs: Touchscreen, microphone, side-mounted fingerprint scanner, accelerometer, proximity, compass
- Website: Official website

The Oppo A58 is a 4G budget smartphone developed & manufactured by OPPO, part of the "A" series. It was introduced on July 26, 2023.

== Specifications ==
=== Design & appearance ===
The screen is made of glass, while the side frames and back panel are made of matte plastic. The back of the Oppo A58 is similar in design to the Oppo A18, Oppo A38, and Oppo A98.

Located at the bottom are the USB-C port, speaker, microphone, and 3.5 mm audio jack. On the left is the tray for two SIM cards and a microSD card up to 1 TB. On the right are the volume buttons and the power button, which includes a built-in fingerprint scanner.

The Oppo A58 is sold in Glowing Black and Dazzling Green colors.

=== Hardware ===
The Oppo A58, like the Oppo A18 and Oppo A38, is powered by a budget system on a chip - the MediaTek Helio G85. It was also powered by a Mali-G52 MC2 GPU and an octa-core composed with 2x Cortex-A75 @ 2.0GHz & 6x Cortex-A55 @ 1.8GHz The device is sold in 6/128 GB, 8/128 GB, and 8/256 GB configurations.

The battery has a capacity of 5000 mAh and supports 33W SUPERVOOC fast charging.

The Oppo A58 features a 6.72-inch IPS LCD display with Full HD+ resolution (2400 × 1080), a pixel density of 392 ppi, a 20:9 aspect ratio, and a circular cutout for the front camera located at the top center. The smartphone features stereo speakers, where the earpiece acts as the second speaker.

The Oppo A58 has a dual main camera setup. It has a 50 megapixel wide-angle lens with an aperture of f/1.8 and phase detection autofocus (PDAF), and a 2 MP depth sensor with an aperture of f/2.4. It also has an 8 MP wide-angle front camera with an aperture of f/2.2.

Both the main and front cameras can record video at 1080p@30fps.

=== Software ===
The Oppo A58 was released with the pre-installed ColorOS 13.1 based on Android 13 and was updated to ColorOS 15 based on Android 15.

A58 4G software update from 2023-2024
Date	OS	UI	References
July 2023	Android 13 (pre-installed)	ColorUI 13.1 (pre-installed)	
February 2024	Android 14	ColorOS 14	
January 2025	Android 15	ColorOS 15	

== Release & availability ==
The official announcement was held on July 26 until its initial release on July 28.

=== Availability by country ===
July 28, 2023

- Indonesia

August 8, 2023

- India
- Malaysia

August 26, 2023

- Philippines

October 2023

- Australia
