= Oppo A17 =

2022 Android smartphones

Oppo A17 Oppo A17k
- Manufacturer: OPPO
- Type: Phablet
- Series: A series
- First released: A17: September 26, 2022; 3 years ago A17k: October 13, 2022; 3 years ago
- Predecessor: Oppo A16; Oppo A16k
- Successor: Oppo A18
- Related: Oppo A58 5G
- Compatible networks: GSM, 3G, 4G (LTE)
- Form factor: Slate
- Colors: A17: Midnight Black, Lake Blue, and Sunlight Orange; A17k: Navy Blue, Blue, Gold
- Dimensions: 164.2×75.6×8.3 mm (6.46×2.98×0.33 in)
- Weight: 189 g (7 oz)
- Operating system: Android 12 with ColorOS 12.1.1
- System-on-chip: MediaTek MT6765G Helio G35 (12 nm)
- CPU: Octa-core (4×2.3 GHz Cortex-A53 & 4×1.8 GHz Cortex-A53)
- GPU: PowerVR GE8320
- Memory: A17: 4 GB; A17k: 3 GB; LPDDR4X
- Storage: 64 GB eMMC 5.1
- Removable storage: microSDXC up to 256 GB
- SIM: Dual SIM (Nano-SIM)
- Battery: Non-removable Li-Po 5000 mAh
- Charging: 10 W
- Rear camera: A17: 50 MP, f/1.8, 26 mm, FoV 77° (wide), 1/2.8", 0.64µm, PDAF + 2 MP, f/2.4 (depth), 1/5.0", 1.75µm A17k: 8 MP, f/2.0, FoV 78° (wide), 1/4.0", 1.12µm, AF; LED flash, HDR, panorama Video: 1080p@30fps
- Front camera: 5 MP, f/2.2, FoV 76.8° (wide), 1/5.0", 1.12µm HDR; Video: 1080p@30fps
- Display: IPS LCD, 6.56", 1612 × 720 (HD+), 20:9, 269 ppi
- Connectivity: Micro-USB 2.0, 3.5 mm jack, Bluetooth 5.3 (A2DP, LE, aptX HD), FM radio, Wi-Fi 802.11 a/b/g/n/ac (Wi-Fi Direct, hotspot), GPS, A-GPS, GLONASS, Galileo, BeiDou
- Water resistance: IPX4
- Other: Fingerprint sensor (side-mounted), proximity sensor, accelerometer, compass
- Website: Official website Oppo A17; Official website Oppo A17k

The Oppo A17 is an Android smartphone manufactured by OPPO Electronics. It was announced on September 26, 2022 and the Oppo A17k became available on October 13, 2022 as a budget model.

== Specifications ==
=== Design, display and hardware ===
The Oppo A17 & A17k features a smooth leather texture at the back panel. At the front the display features a 6.56-inch IPS LCD with resolution at 720 × 1612 px (20:9) and is protected with IPX4 water resisstant screen protector. The phone in not suitable for submerging with water.

Both smartphones are powered by the Mediatek MT6765 Helio G35 chipset with an octa-core layered with 8 Cortex-A53s, clocking respectively at 1.8 GHz anad 2.3 GHz for 4 processors each and the PowerVR GE8320 GPU. The battery is lithium polymer, with a capacity of 5000 mAh. The memory configurations differ from the following models:

Memory configuration (with eMMC 5.1)
Storage	Oppo A17	Oppo A17k
Interior	64 or 128 GB	64 GB only
RAM	3, 4 or 6 GB	3 GB only

It was expandable up to 1TB with the microSD card.

The Oppo A17 features two cameras: a 50MP (f/1.8) main camera and a 2MP (f/2.4) depth senor, while the A17k only has an 8MP (f/2.0) main camera. Both models have the same 5MP front camera and can record up to 1080p at 30fps.

=== Software ===
Both smartphones were released on ColorOS 12.1.1, which is based on Android 12.
