= Oppo A16 =

2021 Android smartphones

Oppo A16 Oppo A16s Oppo A54s
- Manufacturer: OPPO Electronics
- Type: Phablet
- Series: A series
- First released: A16: July 17, 2021; 4 years ago A16s: August 14, 2021; 4 years ago A54s: October 27, 2021; 4 years ago
- Predecessor: Oppo A15; Oppo A53s
- Successor: Oppo A17; Oppo A55s
- Related: Oppo A76; Oppo A54
- Compatible networks: GSM, 3G, 4G (LTE)
- Form factor: Slate
- Colors: A16/A54s: Pearl Blue, Space Silver, Crystal Black; A16s: Same except Space Silver
- Dimensions: 163.8×75.6×8.4 mm (6.45×2.98×0.33 in)
- Weight: 190 g (7 oz)
- Operating system: Original: Android 11 with ColorOS 11.1; Current: Android 12 with ColorOS 12.1
- CPU: MediaTek MT6765G Helio G35 (12 nm), Octa-core (4× 2.3 GHz Cortex-A53 & 4× 1.8 GHz Cortex-A53)
- GPU: PowerVR GE8320
- Memory: A16: 3/4 GB; A16s: 4 GB; A54s: 4/8 GB; LPDDR4X
- Storage: A16: 32/64/256 GB; A16s: 64 GB; A54s: 128 GB eMMC 5.1
- Removable storage: microSDXC up to 256 GB
- SIM: Dual NanoSIM
- Battery: Non-removable Li-Po 5000 mAh
- Charging: 10 W
- Rear camera: A16/A16s: 13 MP, f/2.2, 26mm (wide), 1/3.06", 1.12µm, PDAF + 2 MP, f/2.4 (macro) + 2 MP, f/2.4 (depth); A54s: 50 MP, f/2.2, 26mm (wide), PDAF + 2 MP, f/2.4 (macro) + 2 MP, f/2.4 (depth); LED flash, HDR, panorama Video: 1080p@30fps
- Front camera: 8 MP, f/2.0 26mm (wide); HDR; Video: 1080p@30fps
- Display: IPS LCD, 6.52", 1600 × 720 (HD+), 20:9 ratio, 269 ppi
- Sound: 3.5 mm jack
- Connectivity: USB-C 2.0, Bluetooth 5.0 (A2DP, LE, aptX), NFC (A16s/A54s), FM radio, Wi-Fi 802.11 a/b/g/n/ac, GPS, GLONASS, Galileo, BeiDou
- Model: A16: CPH2269; A16s: CPH2271; A54s: CPH2273
- Other: Side-mounted fingerprint sensor, proximity sensor, accelerometer, compass
- Website: https://www.oppo.com/ph/smartphones/series-a/a16/

The Oppo A16 and Oppo A16s are Android-based budget smartphones developed by Oppo as part of their A series. The Oppo A16 was announced on July 17, 2021, and the A16s was released on August 14, 2021. The primary differences between the models are the inclusion of NFC in the "s" model and variations in memory configurations.

On October 27, 2021, the Oppo A54s was introduced, featuring an upgraded primary camera and different storage options compared to the A16s.

== Design ==
The display is made of glass, while the body is constructed from plastic. It was available in the following color options, depending on the model:

- The Oppo A16 and A54s are available in three colors: Crystal Black, Pearl Blue, and Space Silver.
- The Oppo A16s is sold in Crystal Black and Pearl Blue.

== Specifications ==
=== Hardware ===
The smartphones are powered by the MediaTek Helio G35 SoC and the PowerVR GE8320 GPU. It also has an octa-core Cortex-A53 with 4 processors, clocking at 1.8 to 2.3 GHz.

=== Battery ===
The devices are equipped with a 5000 mAh battery with 10-watt charging.

=== Cameras ===
The smartphones feature a triple camera setup. The Oppo A16 and A16s use a 13 MP f/2.2 wide lens with PDAF, while the A54s uses a 50 MP f/2.2 wide lens with PDAF. All models include a 2 MP f/2.4 macro lens and a 2 MP f/2.4 depth sensor.

All models feature an 8 MP f/2.0 wide front-facing camera. Both the main and front cameras can record video at 1080p@30fps.

=== Display ===
The screen is a 6.52" IPS LCD with HD+ resolution (1600 × 720), a pixel density of 269 ppi, a 20:9 aspect ratio, and a waterdrop notch for the front camera.

=== Memory ===
- Oppo A16: Available in 3/32 GB, 4/64 GB, and 4/256 GB configurations.
- Oppo A16s: Available in a 4/64 GB configuration.
- Oppo A54s: Available in 4/128 GB and 8/128 GB configurations.

=== Software ===
The smartphones were launched with ColorOS 11.1 based on Android 11 and have been updated to ColorOS 12.1 based on Android 12.

== Availability ==
The device was available in certain Southeast Asia and European countries. Also, the Oppo A16 was released in the Philippines on August 10, 2021 in Manila. The 3GB + 32GB was also released on August 28, 2021. Sales in India start on September 20, 2021, and are listed on Amazon.

== Reception ==
Trusted Reviewers critic Jon Mundy noticed slow battery charging. It takes 1 hour and 15 minutes to reach 0-50% and 3 hours to full charge.
