= Oppo A55 =

2021 Android smartphone developed by OPPO

- Brand: OPPO
- Manufacturer: OPPO
- Type: Phablet
- Series: Oppo A
- First released: March 26, 2021; 5 years ago
- Predecessor: Oppo A54
- Successor: Oppo A57 (2022)
- Related: Oppo A55 5G; Oppo A55s; Oppo A76; Oppo A95
- Compatible networks: GSM, 3G, 4G (LTE)
- Form factor: Slate
- Dimensions: 163.6×75.7×8.4 mm (6.44×2.98×0.33 in)
- Weight: 193+/-3 g
- Operating system: Initial: Android 11 + ColorOS 11.1; Current: Android 13 + ColorOS 13.1
- CPU: MediaTek MT6765 Helio G35 (12 nm), Octa-core (4×2.3 GHz Cortex-A53 & 4×1.8 GHz Cortex-A53)
- GPU: PowerVR GE8320
- Memory: 4/6 GB, LPDDR4X
- Storage: 64/128 GB, eMMC 5.1
- Removable storage: MicroSDXC up to 256 GB
- Battery: Non-removable, Li-Po 5000 mAh
- Charging: 18 W fast charging
- Rear camera: 50 MP, f/1.8, 26 mm (wide-angle), PDAF + 2 MP GalaxyCore GC02K0, f/2.4, (macro) + 2 MP GalaxyCore GC02M1B, f/2.4, (depth sensor); LED flash, HDR, panorama Video: 1080p@30fps
- Front camera: 16 MP, f/2.0 (wide-angle), 1/3.06", 1.0 μm HDR; Video: 1080p@30fps
- Display: Type: IPS LCD at 480 nits (typ) to 550 nits (peak); Size: 6.51 inches, 102.3 cm^{2} (~82.6% screen-to-body ratio); Resolution: 720 x 1600 pixels, 20:9 ratio (~270 ppi density)
- Connectivity: USB-C 2.0, 3.5 mm Audio, Bluetooth 5.0 (A2DP, LE, aptX), NFC, FM radio, Wi-Fi 802.11 a/b/g/n/ac (dual-band, Wi-Fi Direct, hotspot), GPS, A-GPS, GLONASS, GALILEO, BDS, QZSS
- Other: Fingerprint scanner (side-mounted), proximity sensor, accelerometer, gyroscope, compass, IPX4 splash resistance

The Oppo A55 is a smartphone developed and manufactured by OPPO and was part of the OPPO A series. It was unveiled on October 1, 2021.

Overall, the A55 differs from its predecessor, the Oppo A54, in design, processor, main camera module, and a newer initial operating system version.

== Design ==
The screen is made of NEG T2X-1 glass. The back frame has a glossy plactic design.

The smartphone is splash-resistant with an IPX4 rating.

At the bottom are a USB-C port, a speaker, a microphone, and a 3.5 mm audio jack. On the left side are the volume buttons and a slot for two SIM cards and a MicroSD memory card up to 256 GB. On the right side is the power button, which has a built-in fingerprint scanner.

The Oppo A55 was sold in Starry Black and Rainbow Blue colors.

== Technical specifications ==
=== Hardware ===
The smartphone features a MediaTek Helio G35 processor and a PowerVR GE8320 GPU. The battery has a capacity of 5000 mAh and supports 18W fast charging.

The display is an IPS LCD, 6.51", HD+ (1600 × 720) with a pixel density of 270 ppi, a 20:9 aspect ratio, and a circular punch-hole cutout for the front camera located in the upper left corner.

The smartphone was sold in 4/64, 4/128, and 6/128 GB configurations. In Ukraine, the smartphone is only sold in the 4/64 GB configuration.

==== Camera ====
The smartphone features a 50 MP triple main camera, f/1.8 (wide-angle) + 2 MP, f/2.4 (macro) + 2 MP, f/2.4 (depth sensor) with phase autofocus and 1080p@30fps video recording capability. The front camera has a 16 MP resolution, f/2.0 aperture (wide-angle), and 1080p@30fps video recording capability.

=== Software ===
The smartphone was released with ColorOS 11.1 based on Android 11 and was updated to ColorOS 13.1 based on Android 13.

== See also ==
- Oppo Find X3
- Xiaomi 12
- Samsung Galaxy A72
