= Oppo A79 5G =

2023 smartphone model

Oppo A79 5G/OnePlus Nord N30 SE 5G (Oppo A2/A1s in China)
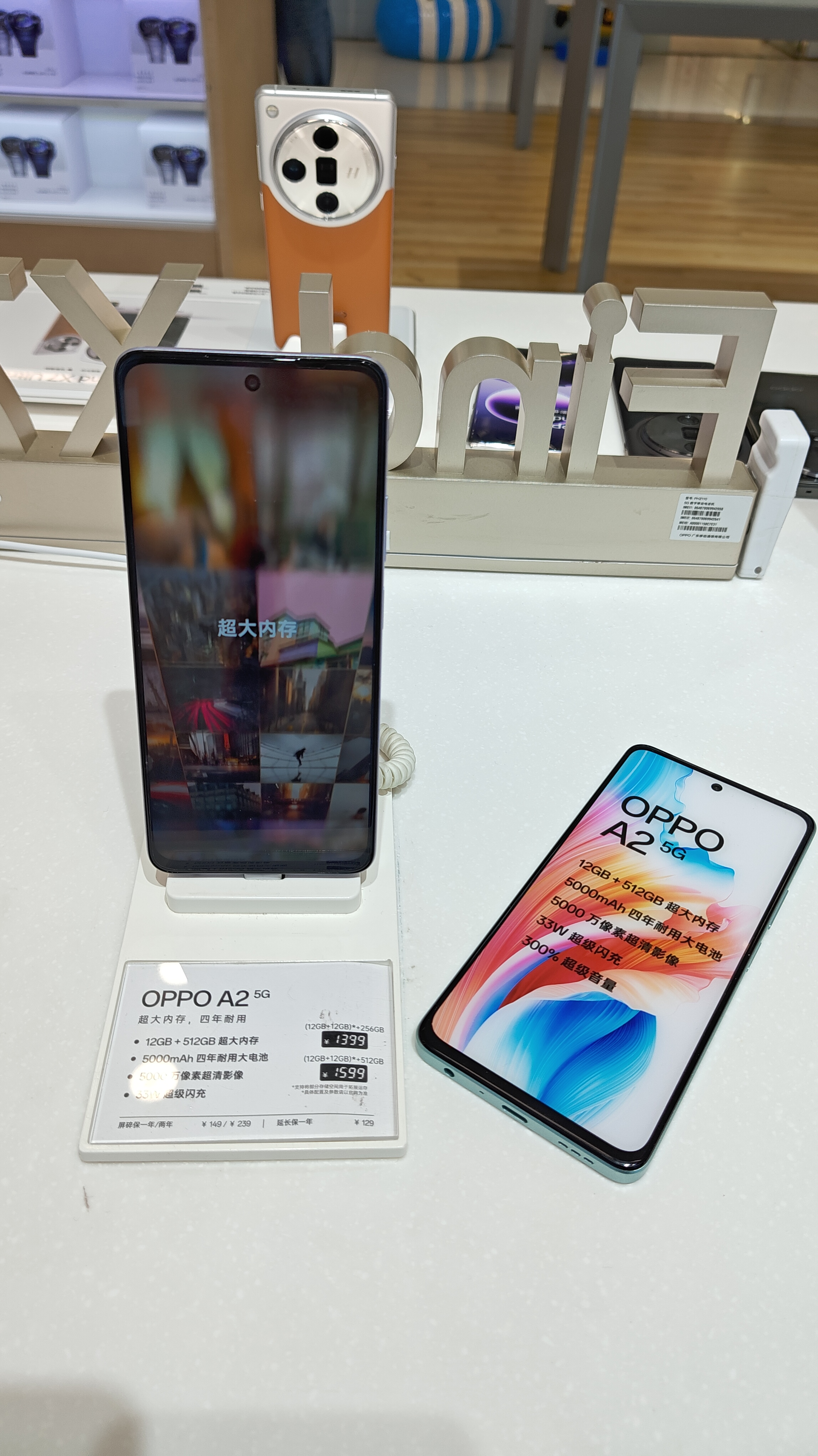
- Oppo A2
- Brand: OPPO / OnePlus
- Manufacturer: OPPO Electronics
- Type: Phablet
- Series: Oppo A / OnePlus Nord
- First released: A79 5G: October 27, 2023; 2 years ago A2: November 3, 2023; 2 years ago A1s: April 16, 2024; 2 years ago OnePlus Nord N30 SE: January 29, 2024; 2 years ago
- Predecessor: Oppo A78 5G; Oppo A1 5G; OnePlus Nord N20 SE
- Successor: Oppo A3 Pro 5G / A80; Oppo A3 (2024); OnePlus N6
- Compatible networks: GSM, 3G, 4G (LTE), 5G
- Form factor: Slate
- Colors: A79 5G: Mystery Black, Dazzling Purple, Glowing Green; A2: Ocean Black, Ice Blue, Emerald Wave; OnePlus Nord N30 SE: Satin Black, Cyan Spark
- Dimensions: 165.6×76×8 mm (6.52×2.99×0.31 in)
- Weight: 193 g (7 oz)
- Operating system: A79 5G / A2: Initial: Android 13 with ColorOS 13.1; Current: Android 15 with ColorOS 15; OnePlus Nord N30 SE: Initial: Android 13 with OxygenOS 13.1; Current: Android 15 with OxygenOS 15
- System-on-chip: MediaTek Dimensity 6020 (7 nm)
- CPU: Octa-core (2×2.2 GHz Cortex-A76 & 6×2.0 GHz Cortex-A55)
- GPU: Mali-G57 MC2
- Memory: A79 5G: 4/8 GB; A2 / A1s: 12 GB; OnePlus Nord N30 SE: 4 GB; LPDDR4X
- Storage: A79 5G: 128/256 GB; A2 / A1s: 256/512 GB; OnePlus Nord N30 SE: 128 GB; UFS 2.2
- Removable storage: MicroSDXC (up to 1 TB)
- SIM: Dual SIM (Nano-SIM)
- Battery: Non-removable Li-Po 5000 mAh
- Charging: Fast charging up to 33W
- Rear camera: 50 MP, f/1.8 (wide), 1/2.76", 0.64 µm, PDAF + 2 MP, f/2.4 (depth); LED flash, HDR, panorama Video: 1080p@30fps
- Front camera: 8 MP, f/2.0 (wide), 1/4", 1.12 µm HDR; Video: 1080p@30fps
- Display: IPS LCD, 90 Hz, 6.72", 2400 × 1080 (FHD+), 20:9 ratio, 392 ppi
- Water resistance: IP54
- Website: Oppo A79 5G Official Website; Oppo A2 Official Website; OnePlus Nord N30 SE 5G Official Website

The Oppo A79 5G is a mid-range smartphone developed by OPPO Electronics. It was announced on October 27, 2023. In China, the Oppo A79 5G was sold under the names Oppo A2 and Oppo A1s. The smartphone was also marketed under the OnePlus brand as the OnePlus Nord N30 SE 5G.

== Design ==
The front panel is made of glass, while the back panel and frame are made of matte plastic.

The bottom houses the USB-C and 3.5 mm audio ports, a speaker, and a microphone. The top includes a secondary microphone. The left side features the volume controls and a card slot for 2 SIM cards and a MicroSD card up to 1 TB. The right side features the power button with an integrated fingerprint sensor.

The Oppo A79 5G was available in three colors: Mystery Black, Dazzling Purple, and Glowing Green. The Oppo A2/A1s was available in the same colors under different names: Ocean Black, Ice Blue, and Emerald Wave, respectively. The OnePlus Nord N30 SE 5G was available only in Satin Black and Cyan Spark.

== Specifications ==
=== Hardware ===
The smartphones are powered by the budget-level system-on-chip MediaTek Dimensity 6020 and a Mali-G57 MC2 GPU. The Oppo A79 5G comes in 4/128 GB, 8/128 GB, and 8/256 GB configurations; the A2/A1s comes in 12/256 GB and 12/512 GB; and the OnePlus Nord N30 SE 5G comes in 4/128 GB.

The devices feature a 5000 mAh battery with support for fast charging up to 33 W.

They feature a 6.72-inch IPS LCD display with a resolution of FHD+ (2400 × 1080 pixels), a 20:9 aspect ratio, a 90 Hz refresh rate, and a circular punch-hole cutout for the front-facing camera centered at the top.

The smartphones include stereo speakers, using the earpiece as the second speaker.

The main camera system consists of a dual setup: a 50 MP wide-angle lens with an aperture of f/1.8 and phase detection autofocus (PDAF), accompanied by a 2 MP depth sensor with an aperture of f/2.4. The front camera features an 8 MP wide-angle lens with an aperture of f/2.0. Both the main and front cameras can record video in 1080p at 30 fps.

=== Software ===
The Oppo A79 5G and Oppo A2/A1s were released running ColorOS 13.1, while the OnePlus Nord N30 SE 5G was released running OxygenOS 13.1, both based on Android 13. They were later updated to ColorOS 15 and OxygenOS 15, respectively, based on Android 15.
