= Oppo A18 =

2023 Android smartphones from Oppo

Oppo A18 Oppo A38
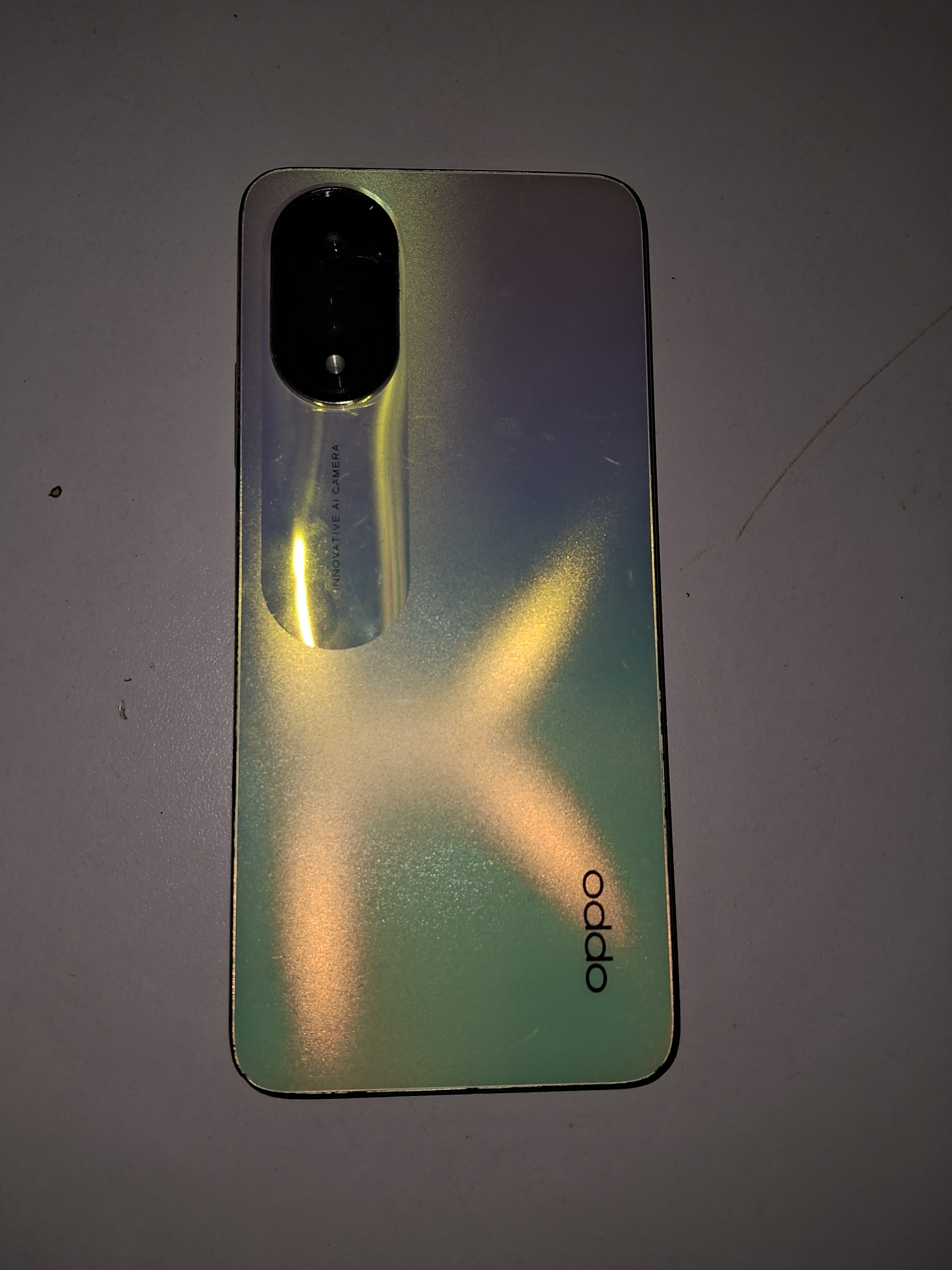
- Oppo A38 in Glowing Gold
- Manufacturer: OPPO
- Type: Phablet
- Series: A series
- First released: A38: September 4, 2023; 2 years ago A18: September 27, 2023; 2 years ago
- Predecessor: Oppo A17; Oppo A36
- Successor: Oppo A3x 4G; Oppo A3 (2024)
- Related: Oppo A58; Oppo A78; Oppo A98
- Compatible networks: List: Technology: GSM / HSPA / LTE; 2G bands: GSM 850 / 900 / 1800 / 1900; 3G bands: A18: HSDPA 850 / 900 / 2100; A38: HSDPA 850 / 900 / 1700(AWS) / 1900 / 2100 - version 1; HSDPA 850 / 900 / 2100 - version 2, version 3; 4G bands (LTE): A18: 1, 3, 5, 7, 8, 20, 28, 38, 40, 41; A38: 1, 2, 3, 4, 5, 7, 8, 12, 13, 17, 18, 19, 26, 28, 38, 40, 41, 66 - version 1; 1, 3, 5, 7, 8, 20, 28, 38, 40, 41 - version 2; 1, 3, 5, 8, 38, 40, 41 - version 3; Speed: HSPA, LTE
- Form factor: Slate
- Colors: A18: Glowing Black, Glowing Blue; A38: Glowing Black, Glowing Gold
- Dimensions: 163.74×75.03×8.16 mm (6.446×2.954×0.321 in)
- Weight: A18: 188 g A38: 190 g
- Operating system: Original: Android 13 with ColorOS 13.1; Current: Android 15 with ColorOS 15
- System-on-chip: MediaTek Helio G85 (12 nm)
- CPU: Octa-core (2×2.0 GHz Cortex-A75 & 6×1.8 GHz Cortex-A55)
- GPU: Mali-G52 MC2
- Memory: A18: 4 GB; A38: 4/6 GB; LPDDR4X
- Storage: A18: 64/128 GB; A38: 128 GB eMMC 5.1
- Removable storage: microSDXC up to 1 TB
- SIM: Dual SIM (Nano-SIM)
- Battery: Non-removable Li-Po 5000 mAh
- Charging: A18: 10 W A38: 33 W SUPERVOOC fast charging
- Rear camera: Wide: A18: 8 MP, f/2.0, 78°, AF; A38: 50 MP, f/1.8, 75.5°, PDAF; Depth: 2 MP, f/2.4, 89.1° Other: LED flash, HDR, panorama Video: 1080p@30fps
- Front camera: 5 MP, f/2.2, 76.8° (wide); HDR, panorama Video: 1080p@30fps
- Display: IPS LCD, 90 Hz, 6.56", 1612 × 720 (HD+), 20:9, 269 ppi
- Connectivity: USB-C 2.0, 3.5 mm jack, Bluetooth 5.3 (A2DP, LE, aptX HD), NFC (A38), Wi-Fi 802.11 a/b/g/n/ac (dual-band), GPS, GLONASS, Galileo, BeiDou, QZSS
- Water resistance: IP54
- Other: Fingerprint sensor (side-mounted), proximity sensor, accelerometer, compass
- Website: Official website (A18); Official website (A38)

The Oppo A18 and Oppo A38 is an entry-level smartphone developed by OPPO as part of the "A" series. It was introduced on September 27, 2023. Additionally, the Oppo A38 was introduced on September 4, 2023, which serves as an improved version of the Oppo A18 based on its specifications.

== Design ==
The display is made of glass, while the side frames and back panel are made of matte plastic. The smartphones also feature dust and splash resistance from the IP54 standard.

The rear design of the models is similar to the Oppo A58 and Oppo A98.

The bottom houses a USB-C port, speaker, microphone, and a 3.5 mm audio jack. The left side contains a slot for two SIM cards and a microSD card up to 1 TB. The right side features volume buttons and a power button with an integrated fingerprint scanner.

The Oppo A18 is sold in Glowing Black and Glowing Blue colors, while the Oppo A38 is available in Glowing Black and Glowing Gold.

== Technical specifications ==
=== Processor ===
The smartphones are powered by a MediaTek Helio G85 processor and a Mali-G52 MC2 GPU.

=== Battery & Charging ===
Both models feature a battery capacity of 5000 mAh. The Oppo A38 also supports 33 W SUPERVOOC fast charging, which take about 75 minutes to fully charge according to the manufacture's claim.

=== Cameras ===
The Oppo A18 and A38 feature a dual main camera setup consisting of a wide-angle lens (8 MP with f/2.0 aperture and autofocus on the A18; 50 MP with f/1.8 aperture and phase-detection autofocus on the A38) and a 2 MP depth sensor with f/2.4 aperture. Both models have a 5 MP front camera with f/2.2 aperture (wide-angle). Both the main and front cameras can record video at 1080p@30fps.

=== Display ===
The display is a 6.56" IPS LCD with HD+ resolution (1612 × 720), a pixel density of 269 ppi, a 20:9 aspect ratio, a 90 Hz refresh rate, Sunlight Display, and a waterdrop notch for the front camera.

Additionally, the A38 comes with "All-Day AI Eye Comfort" to minimize eye strain.

=== Memory ===
The Oppo A18 is sold in 4/64 and 4/128 GB configurations, while the A38 is available in 4/128 and 6/128 GB.

=== Software ===
The smartphones were launched with ColorOS 13.1 based on Android 13 and have been updated to ColorOS 14 based on Android 14 and its last major update ColorOS 15 based on Android 15.
