= Oppo F9 =

Android Smartphone from Oppo

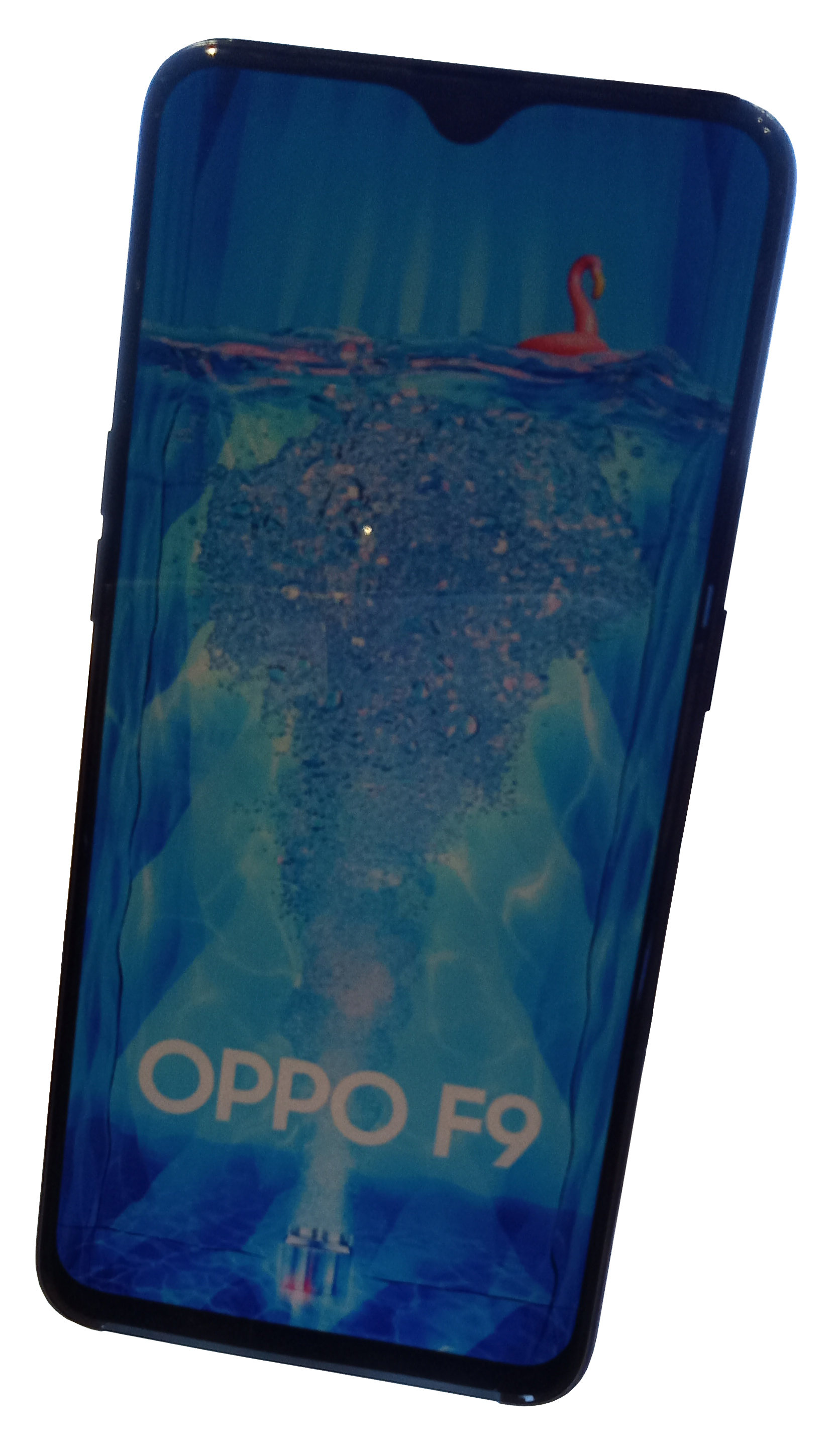
- Brand: Oppo
- Manufacturer: Oppo Electronics Corporation
- Type: Smartphone
- Series: Oppo F
- First released: 15 August 2018
- Availability by region: 15 August 2018: China; Vietnam; 23 August 2018: Indonesia; 24 August 2018: Cambodia; 27 August 2018: Philippines; 28 August 2018: Thailand; 29 August 2018: Nepal; Russia; 30 August 2018: Malaysia; Germany (Discontinued); France; 15 September 2018: India; Greece (Discontinued); Italy; 20 September 2018: Cambodia; 24 October 2018: Australia; 17 November 2018: Spain; 21 December 2018: United Kingdom; United States
- Predecessor: Oppo F7
- Successor: Oppo F11
- Dimensions: 156.70 mm × 74.04 mm × 7.99 mm (6.169 in × 2.915 in × 0.315 in)
- Weight: 169 g (6 oz)
- Operating system: ColorOS 5.2, based on Android 8.1 "Oreo", upgradable to ColorOS 7.2 based on Android 10 "Quince Tart"
- System-on-chip: Mediatek MT6771 Helio P60
- CPU: Octa-core (4x2.0 GHz Cortex-A73 & 4x2.0 GHz Cortex-A53)
- GPU: Mali-G72 MP3 @ 800MHz
- Modem: 4G LTE Cat.12
- Memory: 4 GB or 6 GB LPDDR4X 1866 MHz
- Storage: 64 GB eMMC 5.1
- Removable storage: microSD Card up to 256 GB
- SIM: Nano-SIM, 2 slot SIM card (dual SIM)
- Battery: 3500 mAh Li-Po
- Charging: 20W VOOC Flash Charge, microUSB 2.0 port
- Rear camera: Primary: 16 MP, f/1.8, 1/3.1", 1.0µm, PDAF; Depth: 2 MP, f/2.4, 1/5.0", 1.75µm; LED flash, HDR, panorama; 1080p@30fps
- Front camera: 25 MP, f/2.0, 26mm (wide), 1/2.8", 0.9µm; 1080p@30fps
- Display: 2340×1080 1080pMulti-touch, Capacitive touchscreen with 90.8% screen-to-body ratio; Corning Gorilla Glass 5; Aspect ratio: 19.5:9
- Sound: Vibration; MP3, WAV ringtones
- Connectivity: 2.4/5GHz 802.11 a/b/g/n/acbluetoothBT2.1(+EDR)/BT4.2, location (GPS, Galileo, GLONASS, BeiDou)
- Other: 2G, 3G, LTE, LTE-A
- Website: www.oppo.com/en/smartphone-f9/

The Oppo F9 (F9 Pro in India) is the 2018 smartphone from the Oppo F series launched in August 2018. The Oppo F9 features a waterdrop notch design, and is equipped with VOOC fast charging technology. It has a screen to body ratio of 90.8%.

== Specifications ==
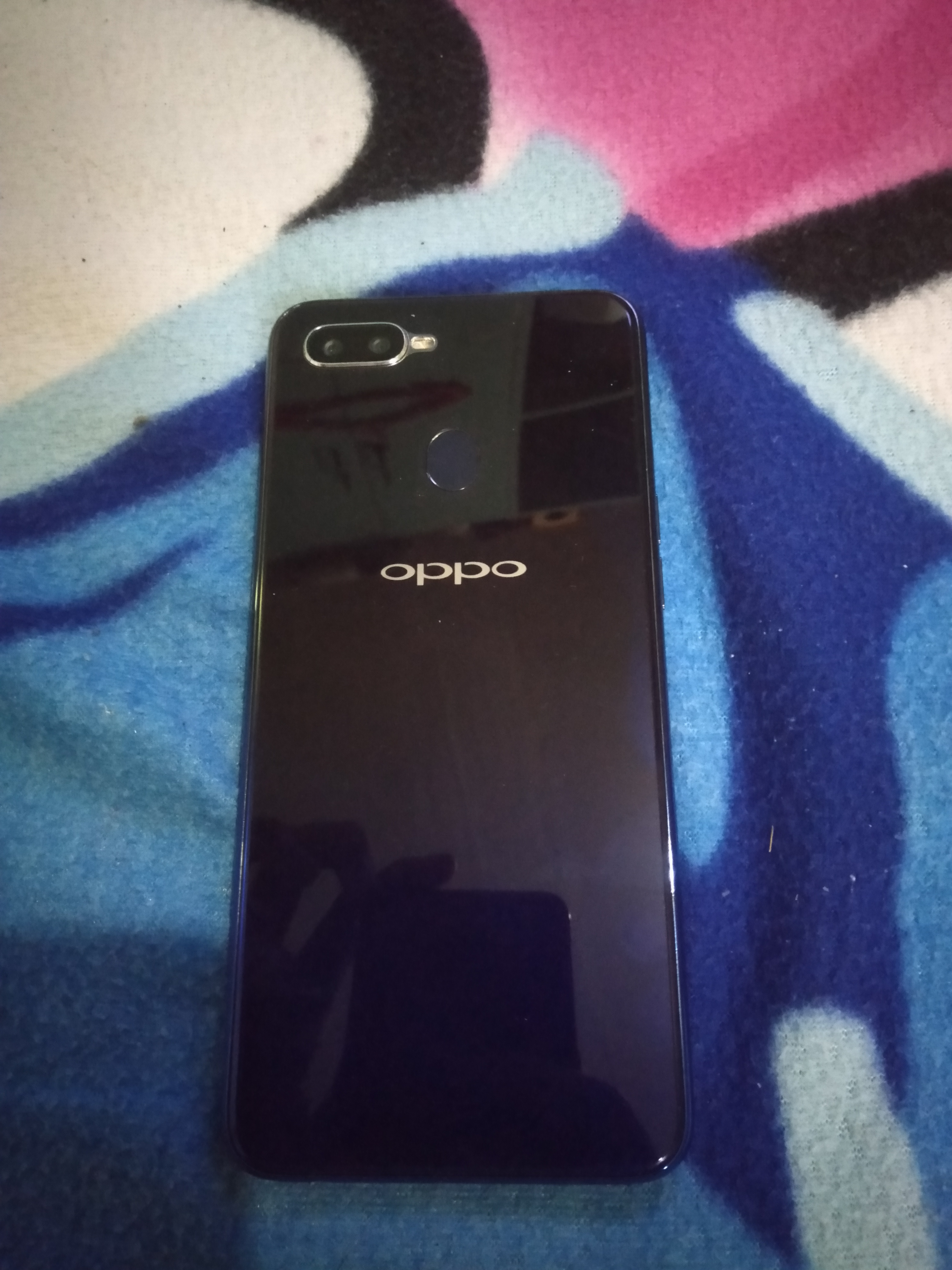
Oppo F9 Twilight Blue color

=== Hardware ===
The Oppo F9 is powered by a 2 GHz octa-core processor and has 4/6 GB of RAM and 64 GB of storage. It operates on ColorOS 5.2 which is a customized version of Android 8.1 (Oreo). It has both a 25 MP front camera and dual 16 + 2 MP rear cameras. It has a 3500mAh battery and is powered by VOOC fast wired charging which delivers 2 hours of talk time with 5 minutes of charging.

=== Memory ===
The Oppo F9 has 64 GB of built-in memory and a dedicated microSD card slot which supports up to 256 GB of additional storage.

=== Display ===
The Oppo F9 features a 6.3-inch (160 mm) 1080x2340 pixel, LTPS IPS LCD, with a pixel density of 409 pixels per inch, and an aspect ratio of 19.5:9. The display is covered by a single pane of Corning Gorilla Glass 6.0.

=== Battery ===
The Oppo F9 features a non-removable Li-Po 3500 mAh battery. It has 20W VOOC Flash Charge, which the company claims to deliver 2 hours of talk time with 5 minutes of charging time.

=== Audio ===
The Oppo F9 includes a sound conduction plate to ensure that the bezel-less design does not affect call quality, and retains the 3.5mm audio jack.

=== Camera ===
It has two cameras on the rear. One is a 16MP wide-angle camera with f/1.8 aperture, with support for face detection and high dynamic range. The secondary camera features an aperture of f/2.4 and optical image stabilization. The company claims that this phone can identify 16 objects during a shoot in real-time, and uses AI to enhance selfie image quality. The front-facing camera is 25-megapixels with an f/2.0 aperture and features face detection and HDR.

== Software ==
The Oppo F9 is equipped with the ColorOS 5.2 which is based on the Android 8.1 Oreo mobile operating system, upgradable to ColorOS 7.2 based on Android 10 Quince Tart (Android Q)
