= Realme C3 =

Android Smartphone

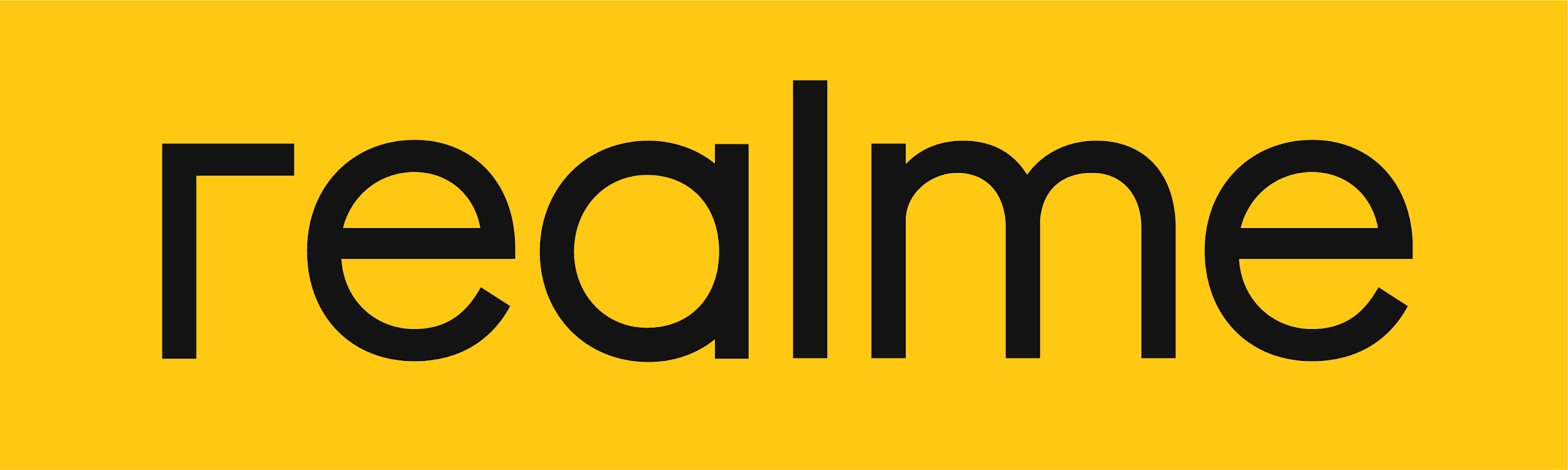

- Realme C3 in Frozen Blue
- Brand: Realme
- Manufacturer: Oppo
- Type: Phablet
- Series: realme C series realme Narzo (India only)
- First released: C3 (India): February 6, 2020; 6 years ago C3 (Global): February 19, 2020; 6 years ago Narzo 10A: May 11, 2020; 6 years ago C3i: June 24, 2020; 6 years ago
- Predecessor: Realme C2
- Related: Realme 5i Realme Narzo 10A
- Colors: Red, Frozen Blue
- Dimensions: C3 & C3i: 6.5 inches, (720 x 1560 pixels)
- Weight: C3 & C3i: 195 g (6.88 oz)
- Operating system: Android 10 (Overlaid with Realme UI 1); Upgradable to Android 11
- System-on-chip: C3 & C3i: MediaTek Helio G70 (12 nm)
- CPU: C3 & C3i: Octa-core (2x2.0 GHz Cortex-A75 & 6x1.7 GHz Cortex-A55)
- GPU: C3 & C3i: Mali-G52 2EEMC2
- Memory: C3: 2/3/4 GB; C3i: 2 GB; Narzo 10A: 3/4 GB
- Storage: C3 & Narzo 10A: 32/64 GB; C3i: 32 GB
- Removable storage: 32 GB or more
- SIM: Nano SIM
- Battery: 5000 mAh
- Rear camera: C3 & 3i: 12 MP, f/1.8, 28mm (wide), 1/2.8", 1.25 μm, PDAF + 2 MP, f/2.4, (depth)
- Front camera: C3 & 3i: 5 MP, f/2.4, 27mm (wide), 1/5", 1.12 μm
- Model: C3 & C3i: RMX2027; Narzo 10A: RMX2020
- Website: www.realme.com/in/realme-c3

The realme C3 and realme C3i are slate-format Android smartphones developed by Realme and released in February 2020 in India and March 2020 in the Philippines. Priced just under $120 and running Android 11, Realme positions it as a budget gaming handset capable of playing PlayerUnknown's Battlegrounds and Mobile Legends: Bang Bang, and is the first device to ship with the MediaTek Helio G70 system-on-chip.

== Features ==
=== Hardware ===
Several variants of the phone were released, with different internal storage capacity, RAM, cameras and NFC support depending on the country. The Indian-market variant only comes with two rear cameras and omits the fingerprint sensor, while the international version is equipped with three rear cameras and a fingerprint sensor. Realme later went on to release the Narzo 10A in India, which is essentially the same device as the international C3 variant apart from a redesigned back cover. The Australian-market release is almost identical to the international variants with the addition of an NFC sensor for wireless payments.

The C3 also comes with a 3.5mm headset jack, a Micro-USB charging port, a 5000mAh lithium-ion battery with reverse-charging support, allowing the phone to double as a power bank, as well as a dual Nano-SIM and MicroSD card tray.

The C3 was initially sold in two colour variants: Frozen Blue and Blazing red; a third colour option named Volcano Grey was later released. The Indian-market Narzo 10A also came in two variants, namely So White and So Blue. Both omit the sunburst design in favour of a glossy back cover with the Realme logo prominently displayed in large type.

=== Software ===
The phone runs on the Android 10 operating system overlaid with Realme's proprietary Realme UI 1.0 interface. An update to Android 11 was announced to be released in March 2021; unofficially, the C3 received ports of LineageOS 18.1 along with a few other custom ROMs.

== Reception ==
The C3 was released to mostly positive reception, with reviewers praising the phone's value proposition and specifications.

While John Nieves of Unbox.ph did criticise the phone's lack of a USB-C port, slow charge times and camera quality, he otherwise remarked the phone's design and performance for its price point, with system-intensive games such as Call of Duty: Mobile and Asphalt 8: Airborne running at decent frame rates. Fergus Halliday of PC World Australia was less than enthusiastic however, expressing criticism towards the C3's camera, onboard storage and overall performance.
