= Realme C2 =

Budget Android smartphone by Realme

realme C2 realme C2 (2020) realme C2s
- Brand: Realme
- Type: Smartphone
- Series: C
- First released: C2: April 22, 2019; 7 years ago C2 (2020): November 2019; 6 years ago C2s: January 7, 2020; 6 years ago
- Predecessor: Realme C1
- Successor: Realme C3
- Compatible networks: GSM, 3G, 4G (LTE)
- Form factor: Slate
- Dimensions: 154.3×73.7×8.5 mm (6.07×2.90×0.33 in)
- Weight: 166 g (6 oz)
- Operating system: Initial: C2/C2 (2020): Android 9 Pie + ColorOS 6 Lite; C2s: Android 9 Pie + ColorOS 6.1; Current: Android 10 + realme UI 1
- CPU: MediaTek MT6762 Helio P22 (12 nm), Octa-core 2.0 GHz Cortex-A53
- GPU: PowerVR GE8320
- Memory: C2/C2 (2020): 2/3 GB; C2s: 3 GB; LPDDR3
- Storage: C2: 16/32 GB; C2 (2020): 32/64 GB; C2s: 32 GB eMMC 5.1
- Removable storage: MicroSDXC up to 256 GB
- Battery: Non-removable Li-Po 4000 mAh
- Rear camera: 13 MP, f/2.2, 1/3.1", 1.12 µm, PDAF + 2 MP, f/2.4, (depth sensor); LED flash, HDR, panorama 1080p@30fps
- Front camera: 5 MP, f/2.0 (wide), 1/5", 1.12 μm HDR; 1080p@30fps
- Display: IPS LCD, 6.1", 1560 × 720 (HD+), 19.5:9 ratio, 282 ppi
- Connectivity: Micro-USB, 3.5 mm audio jack, Bluetooth 4.2, FM radio, Wi-Fi 802.11 b/g/n, hotspot, GPS, A-GPS, GLONASS, BeiDou
- Codename: winter
- Other: Accelerometer, proximity sensor, compass

The realme C2 is an entry-level smartphone developed by Realme. It was introduced on April 22, 2019, alongside the Realme 3 Pro. Additionally, in November 2019, a new version of the smartphone called realme C2 (2020) was introduced, which features a larger amount of built-in storage and is sold in only two colors: blue and black. On January 7, the realme C2s was unveiled, which is available only in a 3/32 GB configuration and comes in one color option - Black.

== Availability ==
The initial launch of the realme C2 was on April 22, 2019. Also, the realme C2 was initially launched in the Philippines on June 8, 2019 and was available at Diamond Blue and Diamond Black color options.

== Design ==
The screen is made of Corning Gorilla Glass 3. The body is made of plastic and features a diamond-cut pattern.

On the bottom, there is a microUSB port, a speaker, a microphone, and a 3.5 mm audio jack. The second microphone is located at the top. On the left side of the smartphone are the volume buttons and a slot for two SIM cards and a MicroSD card up to 256 GB. The power button is located on the right side.

The realme C2 was sold in two colors: Diamond Black, Diamond Blue, Diamond Sapphire, Diamond Ruby, while the 2020 model has the same (Diamond Black and Diamond Blue) two colors except for Diamond Sapphire and Diamond Ruby. In the

== Technical specifications ==
=== Platform ===
The smartphones are equipped with a MediaTek Helio P22 processor and a PowerVR GE8320 GPU. It was also powered by 8 Cortex-A53 cores clocked at 2.0 GHz.

=== Battery ===
The battery has a capacity of 4000 mAh.

=== Camera ===
The smartphone features a dual rear camera: 13 MP, f/2.2 (wide) + 2 MP, f/2.4 (depth sensor, with Bokeh effects) with phase-detection autofocus and the ability to record video at 1080p@30fps. The front camera has a resolution of 5 MP, an aperture of f/2.0 (wide), and is capable of recording video at 1080p@30fps.

=== Display ===
The display is an IPS LCD, 6.1", HD+ (1560 × 720) with a 19.5:9 aspect ratio, a pixel density of 282 ppi, and a waterdrop notch for the front camera.

=== Memory ===
The interior storage configurations differ from the following models:

- The realme C2 is sold in 2/16, 2/32, and 3/32 GB configurations.
- The 2020 version was sold in 2/32 and 3/64 GB configurations.
- The realme C2s was only sold in a 3/32 GB configuration.

=== Software ===
The realme C2 and C2 (2020) were released with ColorOS 6 Lite based on Android 9 Pie. They were updated to realme UI 1 based on Android 10.

The realme C2s was released with ColorOS 6.1 based on Android 9 Pie. It was also updated to realme UI 1 based on Android 10.
