= Oppo A74 =

Oppo A74 (Oppo F19 in India) Oppo Reno6 Lite (Oppo A95; Oppo F19s in India)
- Manufacturer: Oppo
- Type: Smartphone
- Series: A series, F series, Reno series
- First released: F19: April 1, 2021; 5 years ago A74: April 5, 2021; 5 years ago F19s: September 27, 2021; 4 years ago A95: November 16, 2021; 4 years ago Reno6 Lite: January 17, 2022; 4 years ago
- Predecessor: Oppo A73 (2020); Oppo Reno5 Lite
- Successor: Oppo A76; Oppo Reno7 Lite
- Related: Oppo A54; Oppo A74 5G; Oppo F19 Pro+ Oppo Reno6; Oppo Reno6 Z
- Compatible networks: GSM, 3G, 4G (LTE)
- Form factor: Slate
- Colors: A74 / F19: Prism Black and Midnight Blue; Reno6 Lite: Starry Black and Rainbow Silver; A95: Glowing Starry Black and Glowing Rainbow Silver; F19s: Prism Black and Glowing Gold
- Dimensions: 160.3 mm × 73.8 mm × 7.95 mm (6.31 in × 2.91 in × 0.31 in)
- Weight: 163 g (5.75 oz)
- Operating system: Initial: Android 11 with ColorOS 11.1; Current: Android 13 with ColorOS 13.1
- System-on-chip: Qualcomm Snapdragon 662 (11 nm)
- CPU: Octa-core (4×2.3 GHz Kryo 260 Gold & 4×1.8 GHz Kryo 260 Silver)
- GPU: Adreno 610
- Memory: A74: 4 / 6 / 8 GB; Reno6 Lite / F19 / F19s: 6 GB; A95: 8 GB; LPDDR4X
- Storage: A74 / Reno6 Lite / F19 / F19s: 128 GB; A95: 128 / 256 GB; UFS 2.1
- Removable storage: microSDXC up to 256 GB
- SIM: Dual SIM (Nano-SIM)
- Battery: Non-removable Li-Po 5000 mAh
- Charging: 33W fast charging, 54% in 30 min (advertised); SuperVOOC 2.0
- Rear camera: 48 MP, f/1.7, 26mm (wide), 1/2.0", 0.8 µm, PDAF; 2 MP, f/2.4 (depth); 2 MP, f/2.4 (macro); LED flash, HDR, panorama Video: 1080p@30fps
- Front camera: 16 MP, f/2.4, 27mm (wide), 1/3.06" (A74 & A95) / 1/3.09" (F19, F19s & Reno6 Lite), 1.0 µm Panorama; Video: 1080p@30fps
- Display: AMOLED, 6.43 inches, 2400 × 1080 pixels (Full HD+), 20:9 ratio, 409 ppi
- Sound: Loudspeaker, earpiece 3.5 mm audio jack
- Connectivity: USB-C 2.0, Bluetooth 5.0 (A2DP, LE, aptX), NFC (A74 only), FM radio, Wi-Fi 802.11 a/b/g/n/ac (dual-band, Wi-Fi Direct, hotspot), GPS, A-GPS, GLONASS, Galileo, BeiDou
- Data inputs: Fingerprint sensor (under-display, optical), proximity sensor, accelerometer, gyroscope, compass
- Website: https://www.oppo.com/sa-en/smartphones/series-a/a74/

The Oppo A74 is a mid-range smartphone developed, manufactured, and designed by Oppo, forming part of their A series lineup. It was officially announced on April 5, 2021 in the Philippines. It was later releleased on May 20 in that year for Malaysian markets.

On April 1 of the same year, the Oppo F19 was introduced in India, serving as a rebranded alternative variant of the Oppo A74. It was launched 5 days later in that month.

On August 27, 2021, the Oppo F19s was introduced in India alongside the Oppo Reno6 Pro Diwali Edition. The F19s variant distinguished itself from the base Oppo F19 model primarily via fresh color configurations and minor cosmetic modifications on its rear camera housing layout.

On November 16, 2021, the company launched the Oppo A95, a rebranded global variation of the Indian Oppo F19s featuring a silver color profile replacing the gold finish option, backed up by higher internal memory capacities.

Subsequently, on January 17, 2022, the Oppo Reno6 Lite was announced, modifying the configuration profile of the Oppo A95 by downscaling its base structural memory specs.

== Design & build ==
The front display panel is built using protective glass, and the rear panel and structural side frame itself are constructed out of plastic components.

The bottom edge houses the structural USB-C system port, primary sound loudspeaker, internal microphone array, and a legacy 3.5 mm audio headphone jack. The left spine profile provides user access to dedicated physical volume rocking controls alongside a structural 3-slot storage tray handling simultaneous dual Nano-SIM cards and independent microSD expandable storage up to 256 GB. The opposite right side profile contains the standalone physical power button.

=== Colors ===
- Oppo A74 / F19 models are distributed in Prism Black and Midnight Blue finishes.
- Oppo F19s models are distributed in Prism/Glowing Black and Glowing Gold finishes.
- Oppo A95 models are distributed in Glowing Starry Black and Glowing Rainbow Silver finishes.
- Oppo Reno6 Lite models are distributed in Starry Black and Rainbow Silver finishes.

== Specifications ==
=== Hardware ===
The smartphone range utilizes the Qualcomm Snapdragon 662 system-on-chip processor paired with an octa-core composed with 4× 2.3 GHz Kryo 260 Gold cores and 4× 1.8 GHz Kryo 260 Silver cores, alongside an integrated Adreno 610 graphics rendering pipeline processing subsystem.

=== Battery ===
The internal layout houses a non-removable 5000 mAh battery. Power delivery management handles integrated 33W proprietary SuperVOOC 2.0 fast charging logic implementations.

=== Camera ===
The rear primary array uses a triple-sensor module setup consisting of a 48 MP wide sensor module sitting behind an f/1.7 optical aperture lens assembly complete with integrated Phase Detection Autofocus (PDAF), flanked by a secondary 2 MP f/2.4 depth sensor module and an additional 2 MP f/2.4 macro photography capture sensor. Front-facing portrait tasks are processed via a 16 MP punch-hole wide sensor arrangement tracking through an f/2.4 fixed focal lens mechanism. Both front and rear sensor frameworks capture moving footage streams up to standard 1080p resolutions capped at 30 frames per second.

=== Display ===
In the front, the smartphone range was housed by a 6.43-inch AMOLED active display surface pushing an aspect format of 20:9 out to a high-density resolution of 2400 × 1080 pixels (Full HD+) at a raw output density rating of 409 ppi. A custom circular cutout alignment for the front-facing optics array is positioned in the upper-left quadrant of the screen panel space. An optical under-display fingerprint sensor structure sits beneath the lower pane layers.

=== Memory ===
Smartphone models were differed from the following memory configuations:

- Oppo A74: Available in 4 GB, 6 GB, or 8 GB RAM paired with 128 GB internal space options.
- Oppo A95: Shipped in 8 GB RAM matching either 128 GB or 256 GB internal layouts.
- F19 / F19s / Reno6 Lite: Uniformly constrained across retail segments to 6 GB RAM and 128 GB storage modules.

=== Software ===
The lineup originally launched running ColorOS 11.1 user interface based on Android 11 mobile operating system. Operating code upgrades have subsequently refreshed these hardware assets over time up to ColorOS 13.1 running on top of an updated Android 13 OS environment core.

The A74 comes in pre-installed App Market and Hot Apps software platforms.
