= Oppo F7 =

Smartphones released in 2018

Oppo F7 Oppo F7 Youth
- Brand: Oppo
- Manufacturer: OPPO Electronics
- Type: Smartphone
- Series: Oppo F Series
- First released: F7: March 26, 2018; 8 years ago F7 Youth: May 23, 2018; 8 years ago
- Availability by region: F7: List: April 9, 2018: India; April 13, 2018: Vietnam; April 17, 2018: Indonesia; April 21, 2018: Philippines; April 23, 2018: United Arab Emirates; April 24, 2018: Malaysia; April 25, 2018: Thailand Nepal Sri Lanka; April 28, 2018: Cambodia; May 7, 2018: Egypt; May 24, 2018: Morocco; July 6, 2018: Algeria; July 10, 2018: Bangladesh; F7 Youth: List: May 23, 2018: Philippines Myanmar; May 26, 2018: Thailand; May 29, 2018: Cambodia; June 1, 2018: India Vietnam Indonesia; June 4, 2018: Malaysia; June 28, 2018: Nepal
- Predecessor: Oppo F5/F5 Youth
- Successor: Oppo F9
- Related: Realme 1 (F7 Youth)
- Compatible networks: List: Technology: GSM / HSPA / LTE; 2G bands: GSM 850 / 900 / 1800 / 1900; 3G bands: HSDPA 800 / 850 / 900 / 1700(AWS) / 1900 / 2100; 4G bands (LTE): 1, 2, 3, 4, 5, 7, 8, 18, 19, 20, 26, 28, 38, 39, 40, 41; Speed: HSPA 42.2/5.76 Mbps, LTE (2CA) Cat13 600/100 Mbps
- Form factor: Slate
- Colors: F7: Solar Red, Diamond Black, Moonlight Silver; F7 Youth: Solar Red, Diamond Black
- Dimensions: F7: 156.0 mm (6.14 in) H 75.3 mm (2.96 in) W 7.8 mm (0.31 in) D F7 Youth: 156.5 mm (6.16 in) H 75.2 mm (2.96 in) W 7.8 mm (0.31 in) D
- Weight: F7: 158 g (5.6 oz); F7 Youth: 155 g (5.5 oz)
- Operating system: F7: Original: Android 8.1 with ColorOS 5 Current: Android 10 with ColorOS 7.1; F7 Youth: Original: Android 8.1 with ColorOS 5
- System-on-chip: MediaTek MT6771 Helio P60 (12 nm)
- CPU: Octa-core (4x2.0 GHz Cortex-A73 & 4x2.0 GHz Cortex-A53)
- GPU: Mali-G72 MP3
- Memory: F7: 4, 6 GB; F7 Youth: 4 GB
- Storage: F7: 64, 128 GB; F7 Youth: 64 GB
- Removable storage: microSDXC, expandable up to 256 GB
- SIM: Dual nano-SIM
- Battery: F7: 3400 mAh; F7 Youth: 3410 mAh
- Charging: 10W
- Rear camera: F7: Samsung ISOCELL S5K3P8; 16 MP, f/1.8, 27mm (wide), 1/3.1", 1.0µm, PDAF; F7 Youth: OmniVision PureCel®Plus OV13855; 13 MP, f/2.2, 28mm (wide), 1/3.06", 1.12µm, PDAF; All: LED flash, HDR, panorama; 1080p@30fps
- Front camera: F7: Sony IMX 576; 25 MP, f/2.0, 26mm (wide), 1/2.78", 0.9µm, FF; F7 Youth: Samsung ISOCELL (S5K)4H7; 8 MP, f/2.2, 27mm (wide), 1/4.0", 1.12µm, FF; All: 1080p@30fps
- Display: F7: 6.23 in (158 mm); 1080 x 2280 px resolution, 19:9 ratio (~405 ppi density); IPS LCD, 60Hz; Corning Gorilla Glass 5 F7 Youth: 6.00 in (152 mm); 1080 x 2160 px resolution, 18:9 ratio (~402 ppi density); IPS LCD, 60Hz
- Sound: Loudspeaker, 3.5 mm auxiliary (headphone jack)
- Connectivity: Wi-Fi 802.11 b/g/n (2,4 GHz)
- Data inputs: Multi-touch screen; Micro-USB 2.0, OTG; Fingerprint scanner (rear-mounted); Accelerometer; Gyroscope; Proximity sensor; Compass
- Water resistance: None
- Model: F7: CPH1819, CPH1821, 1821, CPH1821EX; F7 Youth: CPH1859, CPH1861, 1861
- Development status: Discontinued

The Oppo F7 is a phablet smartphone based on Android 8.1, which was unveiled on March 26, 2018. The model has a 25 MP front camera and a 16 MP rear camera.

== Specifications ==
=== Hardware ===
The Oppo F7 is powered by a MediaTek MT6771 Helio P60 (12 nm) chipset, it has an octa-core CPU (4x2.0 GHz Cortex-A73 & 4x2.0 GHz Cortex-A53) and a Mali-G72 MP3 GPU.4GB or 6GB of RAM and 64GB or 128GB of eMMC 5.1 internal storage, expandable via a dedicated microSDXC slot. It has a 6.23-inch IPS LCD (1080 x 2280 pixels) protected by Corning Gorilla Glass 5. It is powered by a 3400 mAh Li-Ion battery and includes a rear-mounted fingerprint sensor. Connectivity options feature dual-band Wi-Fi, Bluetooth 4.2, and microUSB 2.0.
