= Realme C1 =

Entry-level Android smartphone developed by Realme

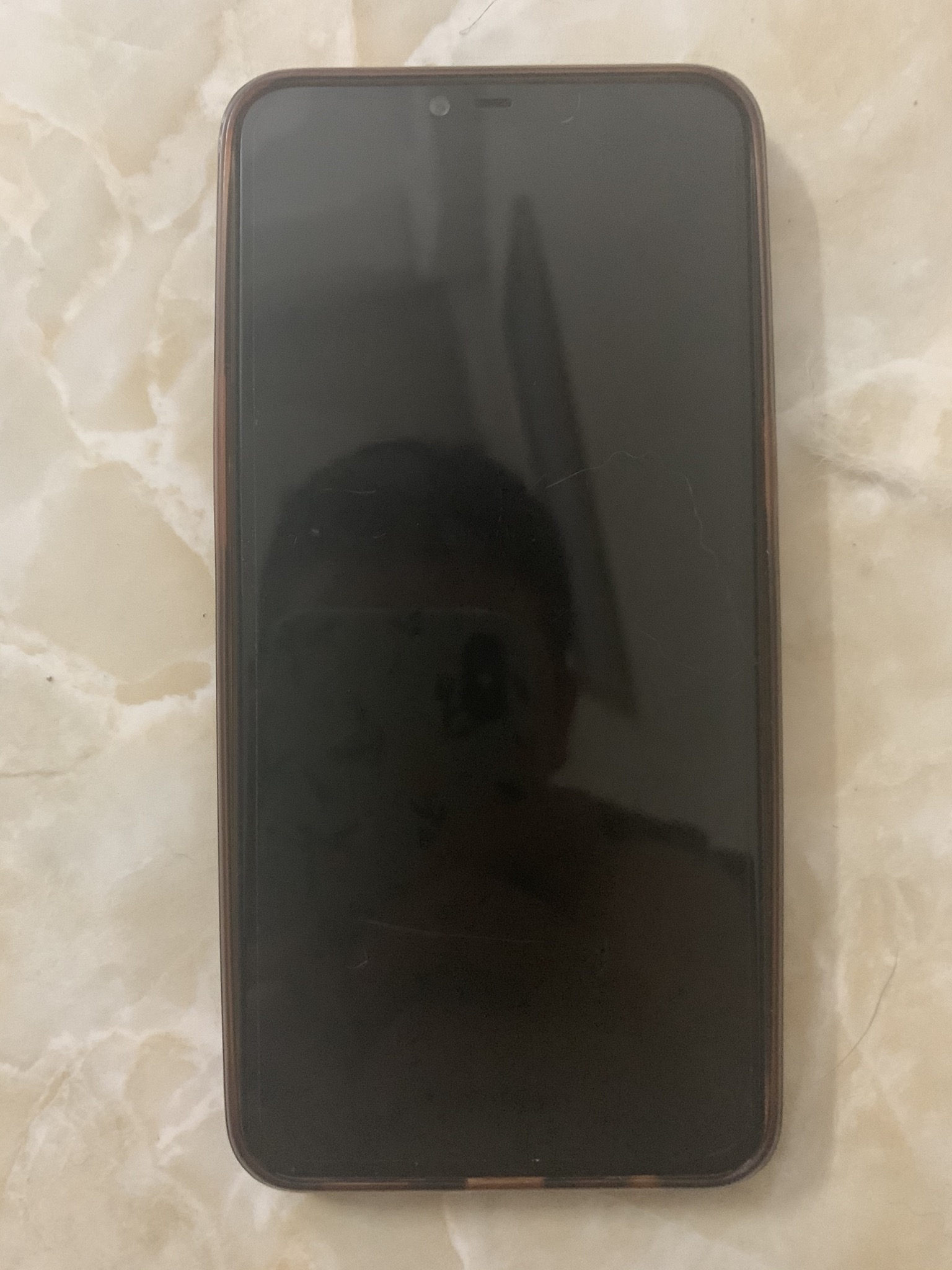
- Realme C1
- Brand: Realme, OPPO
- Manufacturer: OPPO Electronics
- Type: Smartphone
- Series: Realme C Oppo A
- Availability by region: A3s: July 13, 2018; 8 years ago C1: September 28, 2018; 7 years ago Philippines release: November 29, 2018; C1 2019: January 28, 2019; 7 years ago A12e: April 3, 2020; 6 years ago
- Successor: Realme C2
- Related: Oppo A3; Oppo A12
- Compatible networks: GSM, 3G, 4G LTE
- Form factor: Slate
- Dimensions: 156.2 mm × 75.6 mm × 8.2 mm (6.15 in × 2.98 in × 0.32 in)
- Weight: 168 g (5.9 oz)
- Operating system: Initial: Android 8.1 Oreo + ColorOS 5.2; Current: Android 9 Pie + ColorOS 6
- CPU: Qualcomm SDM450 Snapdragon 450 (14 nm), 8x1.8 GHz Cortex-A53
- GPU: Adreno 506
- Memory: C1: 2 GB; C1 2019: 2/3 GB; A3s: 2/3/4 GB; A12e: 3 GB; LPDDR3
- Storage: C1: 16 GB; C1 2019: 32 GB; A3s: 16/32/64 GB; A12e: 64 GB eMMC 5.1
- Removable storage: microSDXC up to 256 GB'
- Battery: Non-removable Li-Ion 4230 mAh
- Rear camera: Dual-Camera Setup; Primary: Hynix Hi-1333; 13 MP, f/2.2, 26mm (wide), 1/3.1", 1.12 µm, AF; Depth: GalaxyCore GC2375H; 2 MP, f/2.4, 1/5.0", 1.75 µm; Camera features: LED flash, HDR, Panorama; Video recording: 1080p@30fps
- Front camera: A3s / A12e: CPH1853 / CPH1805: GalaxyCore GC8034; 8 MP, f/2.0, 28mm (wide), 1/4.0", 1.12 µm, FF; CPH1803: 8 MP, f/2.2, 28mm (wide), 1/4.3", 1.0 µm, FF; C1 / C1 2019: GalaxyCore GC5025; 5 MP, f/2.2, 28mm (wide), 1/5.0", 1.12 µm, FF; Camera features: HDR; Video recording: 1080p@30fps
- Display: IPS LCD, 6.2 in, 1520 x 720 pixels (720p HD+), 19:9 ratio, 271 ppi
- Connectivity: microUSB 2.0, 3.5 mm jack, Bluetooth 4.2 (A2DP, LE), FM radio, Wi-Fi 802.11 b/g/n (Wi-Fi Direct, hotspot), GPS, A-GPS
- Data inputs: Accelerometer, proximity sensor, compass

The realme C1 is an entry-level Android smartphone developed and designed by Oppo under their Realme sub-brand. It was introduced on September 27, 2018, alongside the Realme 2 Pro.

== Model variations ==
On January 28, 2019, a new version of the smartphone was introduced under the name realme C1 (2019), featuring an increased storage capacity. In India, the Realme C1 was sold under the OPPO brand name as the Oppo A3s, which was initially launched on July 13, 2018. The Oppo A3s was later re-released on April 3, 2020, for the Vietnamese market under the name Oppo A12e.

== Design ==
The display is protected by Corning Gorilla Glass 3. The body of the phone is constructed out of glossy plastic.

The bottom edge houses a microUSB port, speaker, microphone, and a 3.5 mm jack. The secondary microphone is located on the top edge. On the left side of the smartphone, there are the volume adjustment buttons and a triple slot accommodating 2 SIM cards and a microSD expandable storage card up to 256 GB. The power button is positioned on the right side.

=== Color options ===
The realme C1 (including the 2019 model year) was sold in black and blue color variants. The Oppo A3s and A12e was sold in Red and Dark Purple color variants.

== Specifications ==
=== Hardware ===
The smartphones are equipped with a Qualcomm Snapdragon 450 processor paired with an Adreno 506 graphics processing unit. It is powered by a non-removable 4230 mAh battery.

=== Camera ===
The phone features a dual rear camera configuration consisting of a 13 MP main sensor with an aperture of f/1.8 and a 2 MP secondary depth sensor with an aperture of f/2.4. It supports autofocus and is capable of shooting 1080p video at 30fps. The front-facing camera has a 5 MP resolution, a f/2.2 aperture lens (wide-angle), and can record 1080p video at 30fps.

=== Display ===
The device features a 6.2-inch IPS LCD display with a HD+ resolution (1520 × 720 pixels), a 19:9 aspect ratio, and a pixel density of 271 ppi. The screen features a display notch housing the front-facing camera, earpiece, and proximity/ambient light sensors.

=== Memory ===
The original Realme C1 was available in a 2 GB RAM and 16 GB internal storage configuration. The 2019 edition was offered in 2 GB RAM / 32 GB storage and 3/32 GB variants.

The Oppo A3s was shipped in 2/16 GB, 3/32 GB, and 4/64 GB variations, while the Oppo A12e was configured specifically with 2/16 GB.

=== Software ===
The device originally launched running ColorOS 5.2 based on Android 8.1 Oreo, and was later updated to ColorOS 6 based on Android 9 Pie.
