= Oppo A54 =

2021 Android smartphone developed by OPPO

- Brand: OPPO
- Type: Phablet
- Series: Oppo A
- First released: March 26, 2021; 5 years ago
- Availability by region: April 1, 2021 (International)
- Predecessor: Oppo A53 (2020)
- Successor: Oppo A55
- Related: Oppo A54 5G; Oppo A74; Oppo A94
- Compatible networks: GSM, 3G, 4G (LTE)
- Form factor: Monoblock
- Colors: Crystal Black, Starry Blue
- Dimensions: 163.6×75.7×8.4 mm (6.44×2.98×0.33 in)
- Weight: 192 g (7 oz)
- Operating system: Initial: Android 10 + ColorOS 7.2; Current: Android 11 + ColorOS 11.1
- CPU: MediaTek MT6765 Helio P35 (12 nm), Octa-core (4×2.35 GHz Cortex-A53 & 4×1.8 GHz Cortex-A53)
- GPU: PowerVR GE8320
- Memory: 4/6 GB, LPDDR4X
- Storage: 64/128 GB, eMMC 5.1
- Removable storage: MicroSDXC up to 256 GB
- Battery: Non-removable, Li-Po 5000 mAh
- Charging: 18 W Fast charging
- Rear camera: 13 MP OmniVision OV13B10, f/2.2, 25 mm (wide-angle), 1/3.06", 1.12 μm, PDAF + 2 MP GalaxyCore GC02K0, f/2.4, (macro) + 2 MP GalaxyCore GC02M1B, f/2.4, (depth sensor); LED flash, HDR, panorama Video: 1080p@30fps
- Front camera: 16 MP, f/2.0 (wide-angle), 1/3.06", 1.0 μm HDR; Video: 1080p@30fps
- Display: IPS LCD, 6.51", 1600 × 720 (HD+), 20:9, 270 ppi
- Connectivity: USB-C 2.0, 3.5 mm Audio, Bluetooth 5.0 (A2DP, LE, aptX HD), NFC, FM radio, Wi-Fi 802.11 a/b/g/n/ac (dual-band, Wi-Fi Direct, hotspot), GPS, A-GPS, GLONASS, Galileo, BDS
- Data inputs: Fingerprint scanner (side-mounted), proximity sensor, accelerometer, gyroscope, compass

Oppo A54 is a smartphone developed by OPPO and was part of the A series. It was announced on March 26, 2021, and released on April 1, 2021.

== Design ==
The display is made of regular glass, while the back and frame are made of glossy plastic.

On the bottom, there is a USB-C port, a speaker, a microphone, and a 3.5 mm audio jack. On the left side, there is a slot for two SIM cards and a microSD memory card up to 256 GB. On the right side, there is the smartphone's lock button, which has a built-in fingerprint scanner. The front/selfie camera was displayed on the front and positioned at the top left corner.

The Oppo A54 was only available in 2 color options: Crystal Black and Starry Blue.

== Technical specifications ==
=== Hardware ===
The smartphone features a MediaTek Helio P35 SoC and a PowerVR GE8320 GPU. The battery has a capacity of 5000 mAh and supports 18 W fast charging.

The A54 features an IPS LCD, sizing about 6.51", HD+ (1600 × 720) with a pixel density of 270 ppi, a 20:9 aspect ratio, and a circular cutout for the front camera located in the top left corner.

The smartphone was sold in 4/64, 4/128, and 6/128 GB configurations. In Ukraine, the smartphone is sold in 4/64 and 4/128 GB configurations.

=== Camera ===
The smartphone's vertical rectangular module features a 16 MP triple main camera, f/2.2 (wide-angle) with phase autofocus + 2 MP, f/2.4 (macro) + 2 MP, f/2.4 (depth sensor), and a 16 MP f/2.0 (wide-angle) front camera. Both the main and front cameras can record video at 1080p@30fps.

=== Software ===
The Oppo A54 was released with ColorOS 7.2 based on Android 10. It was later updated to ColorOS 11.1 based on Android 11 as last major android upgrade.

== See also ==
- Realme C35
- Vivo V20
