= Oppo A58 5G =

Android smartphones

Oppo A58 5G (Oppo A78 5G) Oppo A58x 5G/A1x
- Manufacturer: OPPO Electronics
- Type: Phablet
- Series: A
- First released: A58 5G: November 8, 2022; 3 years ago A78 5G: January 7, 2023; 3 years ago A58x: December 15, 2022; 3 years ago A1x: March 31, 2023; 3 years ago
- Availability by region: A78 5G: Worldwide; A58 5G/A58x/A1x: China; Oppo K10 5G: India; OnePlus Nord N300 5G: United States
- Predecessor: Oppo A57 5G; Oppo A77 5G
- Successor: Oppo A59 5G; Oppo A2x; Oppo A79 5G
- Compatible networks: GSM, 3G, 4G (LTE), 5G
- Form factor: Slate
- Colors: A58 5G/A58x/A1x: Black, Blue, Purple; A78 5G: Glowing Black, Glowing Purple
- Dimensions: 163.8 mm (6.45 in) H 75.1 mm (2.96 in) W 8 mm (0.31 in) D
- Weight: A58 5G/A78 5G: 188 g (6.6 oz); A58x/A1x: 186 g (6.6 oz)
- Operating system: Initial: Android 12 + ColorOS 12.1; Current: Android 14 + ColorOS 14
- System-on-chip: MediaTek Dimensity 700 (7 nm)
- CPU: Octa-core (2×2.2 GHz Cortex-A76 & 6×2 GHz Cortex-A55)
- GPU: Mali-G57 MC2
- Memory: A58 5G/A58x/A1x: 6/8 GB; A78 5G: 4/8 GB; LPDDR4X
- Storage: A58 5G/A78 5G: 128/256 GB; A58x/A1x: 128 GB; UFS 2.2
- Removable storage: MicroSDXC up to 1 TB
- SIM: Dual SIM (Nano-SIM)
- Battery: Non-removable Li-Po 5000 mAh
- Charging: A58 5G/A78 5G: Fast charging up to 33 W A58x/A1x: 10 W
- Rear camera: Wide-angle: A58 5G/A78 5G: 50 MP, f/1.8, 27 mm, PDAF; A58x/A1x: 13 MP, f/2.2, 25 mm, PDAF; Depth sensor: 2 MP, f/2.4; Other: LED flash, HDR, panorama; Video: 1080p@30fps
- Front camera: 8 MP, f/2.0, 27 mm (wide); Panorama; Video: 1080p@30fps
- Display: IPS LCD, 90 Hz, 6.56 in, 1612 × 720 (HD+), 20:9, 269 ppi

Oppo A58 5G and Oppo A58x 5G are mid-range smartphones with 5G support, developed and made by OPPO Electronics. The Oppo A58 5G was introduced on November 8, 2022, and the Oppo A58x 5G was launched on December 15 of the same year. The main differences between the smartphones are the charging speed and the primary camera sensor.

On January 7, 2023, the Oppo A58 5G was introduced to the global market under the name Oppo A78 5G. Furthermore, on March 31, 2023, OPPO re-released the Oppo A58x 5G under the name Oppo A1x.

The A78 5G was released in India on January 16, 2023, followed by South Africa on February 28. In Australia, it was released on April 20, 2023.

== Design ==
The front panel is made of glass, while the rear panel and frame are made of matte plastic.

Located at the bottom are the USB-C and 3.5 mm audio connectors, a speaker, and a microphone. On the left side are the volume buttons and a card slot for 2 SIM cards and a microSD memory card up to 1 TB. On the right side is the power button, which integrates a fingerprint scanner. It possesses an IPX4 rating for ingress protection, indicating resistance to water splashes, though it is not certified for liquid immersion.

The Oppo A58 5G and A58x 5G were sold in 3 colors: black, blue, and purple. The Oppo A1x was available only in black and blue colors. In contrast, the Oppo A78 5G was sold in Glowing Black and Glowing Purple.

== Specifications ==
=== Hardware ===
The smartphones feature an entry-level system-on-chip, the MediaTek Dimensity 700 paired with an octacore composed of Octa-core 2× 2.2 GHz Cortex-A76 cores and 6× 2 GHz Cortex-A55 cores, and a Mali-G57 MC2 GPU. The Oppo A58 5G was sold in configurations of 6/128 GB, 8/128 GB, and 8/256 GB; the A78 5G in 4/128 GB, 8/128 GB, and 8/256 GB; and the Oppo A58x 5G/A1x in 6/128 GB and 8/128 GB configurations.

The smartphones carry a rechargeable battery with a capacity of 5000 mAh. The Oppo A58 5G/A78 5G supports SUPERVOOC "Flash Charge" fast charging up to 33 W, whereas the A58x 5G/A1x supports standard charging up to 10 W.

The smartphones feature a 6.56-inch IPS LCD screen with a display resolution of HD+ (1612 × 720 pixels), an aspect ratio of 20:9, a 90 Hz display refresh rate, and a teardrop notch for the front-facing camera.

The smartphones feature stereo speakers, where the earpiece doubles as a secondary speaker.

The Oppo A58 5G/A78 5G features a 50 MP primary wide-angle lens with an f/1.8 aperture and phase detection autofocus (PDAF), while the Oppo A58x 5G/A1x features a 13 MP lens with an f/2.2 aperture and PDAF. On all models, the wide-angle lens is accompanied by a 2 MP depth sensor with an f/2.4 aperture. Additionally, all smartphones feature an 8 MP wide-angle front camera with an f/2.0 aperture. Both the primary and front cameras across all models are capable of recording video at 1080p@30fps.

=== Software ===
The smartphones were released running ColorOS 12.1 based on Android 12, and were later updated to ColorOS 14 based on Android 14.
