= Oppo F5/F5 Youth =

Smartphones made by Oppo Electronics

OPPO F5/F5 Youth
- Brand: Oppo
- Manufacturer: Oppo Electronics Corporation
- Series: Oppo F
- First released: F5: October 26, 2017; 9 years ago F5 Youth: November 25, 2017; 8 years ago
- Availability by region: F5: List: November 2, 2017: India Vietnam Malaysia Thailand; November 4, 2017: Philippines; November 9, 2017: Myanmar; November 10, 2017: Russia Sri Lanka; November 11, 2017: Pakistan; November 13, 2017: Indonesia; November 14, 2017: Nepal; F5 Youth: List: November 25, 2017: Philippines; November 30, 2017: Indonesia; December 1, 2017: India Vietnam Myanmar; December 2, 2017: Malaysia Thailand; December 6, 2017: Nepal; December 7, 2017: Pakistan
- Predecessor: Oppo F3
- Successor: Oppo F7
- Dimensions: 156.5 mm (6.16 in) H 76.0 mm (2.99 in) W 7.5 mm (0.30 in) D
- Weight: 152 g (5.4 oz)
- Operating system: Android 7.1 "Nougat"; ColorOS 3.2
- System-on-chip: Mediatek MT6763T Helio P23 (16 nm)
- CPU: Octa-core 2.5 GHz Cortex-A53
- GPU: Mali-G71 MP2
- Memory: F5: 4GB or 6GB; F5 Youth: 3GB or 4GB
- Storage: F5: 32GB or 64GB; F5 Youth: 32GB
- Battery: Li-Ion 3200 mAh
- Rear camera: F5: Samsung S5K3P8SX; 16 MP, f/1.8, 27mm, 1/3.1", 1.0µm, PDAF; F5 Youth: OmniVision OV13855; 13 MP, f/2.2, 28mm, 1/3.06", 1.12µm, PDAF; All: LED flash, HDR, panorama; 1080p@30fps
- Front camera: F5: Sony IMX 376; 20 MP, f/2.0, 26mm (wide), 1/2.78", 1.0μm; F5 Youth: Sony IMX 371; 16 MP, f/2.0, 26mm (wide), 1/3.06", 1.0µm; All: 1080p@30fps
- Display: LTPS IPS LCD capacitive touchscreen 6.0 inches (92.9 cm2) 1080 x 2160 pixels, 18:9 aspect ratio, Corning Gorilla Glass 5, 16M colors
- Sound: Vibration; MP3, WAV ringtones
- Connectivity: Wi-Fi 802.11 a/b/g/n, WiFi Direct, Hotspot BT 4.2, A2DP, LE
- Website: www.oppo.com/en/smartphone-f5/ www.oppo.com/en/smartphone-f5-youth/

The Oppo F5 and Oppo F5 Youth are smartphones manufactured by the Chinese tech company Oppo Electronics Corporation (known as Oppo). The F5 was released in October 2017, whilst the F5 Youth was released in November 2017, under Oppo's F Series. The series began in January 2016, with the release of the Oppo F1, delivering succeeding smartphones on a 6-month time interval with alternative variants such as the F3 Plus and F5 Youth. These phones have a heavy emphasis on the capabilities of its front-facing camera.

These phones are made to be the successors of the Oppo F3 and Oppo F3 Plus, released in May 2017 and April 2017, respectively. The F5 and F5 Youth are the predecessors of the Oppo F7 and Oppo F7 Youth, as the company continues their production and development of the F series.

== Specifications ==
=== Hardware ===
The Oppo F5 and Oppo F5 Youth possess similar specifications in terms of their hardware. Both phones are touchscreen operated, measured at 156.5 mm × 76 mm × 7.5 mm, and weigh 152 grams. These are both lighter than their predecessor, the Oppo F3, which weighs 153 grams.

The Oppo F5 has a plastic backing, whilst the F5 Youth uses an aluminium back. Both of the front panels are LCD glass touchscreens that use Corning's Gorilla Glass 5.

Their technology is both capable of running on GSM (2G), HSPA (3G), and LTE (4G) networks. The phones are also equipped with internal GPS, Bluetooth 4.2, and supports dual-SIM functions, just as its predecessors, the Oppo F3 and F3 Plus, did.

Both the F5 and F5 Youth come with a 3200 mAh battery, which remain unchanged from the F3. Despite not changing the battery size, users and critics have said that Oppo have successfully optimized the power consumption of the phones, as there has been a significant increase in screen-on time. Oppo has continued to keep the batteries on the series non-removable.

The phones both have 6-inch screens, with a FHD+ touchscreen with a screen resolution of 1080 × 2160 pixels in an 18:9 aspect ratio. These screens both support multi-touch. This is an incremental change from the F3, which had a 1080 x 1920 5.5-inch display in a 16:9 aspect ratio.

The F5 and F5 Youth are powered by the same Octa-core 2.5 GHz Cortex-A53 processor, and also the same Mali-G71 MP2 graphics card. The Oppo F5 offers either 4 GB or 6 GB of RAM, whilst the F5 Youth variant is available in either 3 GB or 4 GB of RAM, depending on the country of purchase.

The internal storage of the phones depends on their variant. The Oppo F5 4 GB RAM comes with 32 GB of internal storage, whil3 the 6 GB variant comes with 64 GB internal storage. The Oppo F5 Youth is available with only 32 GB of internal storage, regardless of model. The phones have an expandable microSD slot, which can be expanded to 256 GB.

The camera on the phones differ, as the F5 rear camera has 16 MP with features such as LED flash, HDR, panorama, and 1080p/30 fps recording capability. Its front-facing camera, which is strongly marketed by Oppo, has a 20 MP lens. The F5 Youth shares similar specifications to the F3, as they both carry 13 MP rear cameras, which are capable of LED Flash, HDR, panorama, and 1080p/30 fps recording capability. Their front-facing cameras shoot at 16 MP.

The F5 and F5 Youth support the 3.5 mm headphone jack, and also have a loudspeaker located on the bottom of the phones, next to its microUSB 2.0 On-The-Go charging port.

Oppo has kept the main sensors found in the F3 and F3 Plus: the accelerometer, proximity sensor, light sensor, and magnetometer. The fingerprint sensor has been moved from the front of the phone to the back on both the F5 and F5 Youth.

=== Software ===
The Oppo F5 and F5 Youth's operating system by default is Android 7.1 (Nougat), but may vary to 7.1.1, depending on the variant distributed per region. The OS of these phones can be further updated until the phone is no longer supported by the latest Android version.

Both phones shipped with ColorOS 3.2, which is based on Android 7.1.1, while the F3 and F3 Plus ran on ColorOS Android 6.0.

== Reception ==
GSM Arena have provided a very detailed review of the qualities which they liked and disliked about the Oppo F5. They have categorized the phone to be 'trendy', as it possessed the main features that most modern 2017 phones would have, such as trimmed bezels, face unlock, and ultra-wide aspect ratios. The reviewer found the display of the phone to have excellent color contrast along with sharp and precise images because of its 402 ppi density. GSM Arena have tested the battery life of the phone and gave a 91-hour endurance rating when they conducted their daily tests and was described to be a good score based on their standards. Overall, GSM Arena have recommended the phone as a whole, but they believed it should have been priced better as a mid-range tier phone. GSM Arena did not provide their own review for the Oppo F5 Youth.

Andrew Williams from Trusted Reviews discussed his opinions about the Oppo F5 on 19 December 2017. He praised the phones' widescreen with thin bezels, which are uncommonly found on a mid-tier phone. In terms of performance, Williams finds that the phone ran decently, but struggled to compete with the processors of its competition. He said that it did however possess decent frame rates to play games and navigate through the phone smoothly without many issues. The front-facing camera is highly applauded by Williams, as it was able to capture detailed and accurate selfies. However the rear camera did not receive the same positive feedback, as he mentioned that it was heavily dependent on the lighting of the scenery, but was capable of capturing detail-rich images occasionally. The reviewer also states that the battery life of the phone was not an issue, however it did not last long enough to become one of its strengths. Williams concluded that the phone would be a solid choice as a budget Android operating phone, especially for those who enjoy taking selfies.

The Oppo F5 was also reviewed by Abhishek Baxi from Android Authority on 26 August 2018 in an article titled "Great selfies come at a premium". After spending two weeks with the phone, Baxi wrote that the phone did not fit well with its 'selfie expert' claim. According to the review, the phone's overall performance was enough to satisfy most people, but wrote that there were better and cheaper alternatives in the market. Baxi criticized the phone's plastic covered back and heavy weight, but commended the ergonomic build of the phone, noting the rounded edges and the ease of single-handed use. He claimed that the display had great viewing angles, showing clear and crisp color accuracy, despite being under direct sunlight. Baxi said that processor and chipset of the phone performed decently "if you don't stretch it too much". Again, the micro USB charging port has been criticized by the reviewer, as it did not support fast charging. His review of the camera has also claimed that it was heavily dependent on the lighting, as there is a noticeable quality drop in low lighting conditions, but is more than capable of taking high-quality images.

In a heavily positive review, the Oppo F5 Youth was reviewed by Criss Galit from Gadget Pilipinas. Galit labelled the phone as "Great Value for Less". Galit started off by complementing the generous screen to body ratio and adds on to this by saying that "it doesn't feel like you're holding a 6-inch smartphone", as it feels comfortable when holding this in use. The reviewer describes the display of this phone as crisp, vibrant, and color accurate, even when placed under direct sunlight. He writes that the quality of the phone's audio is loud and crisp, with a present bass, but can sound slightly affected when playing at full volume. Galit applauded the operating system of the phone, as it is simple, clean, and pleasant to the eyes. Both the front-facing and rear camera are heavily commended by the reviewer, as they are capable of capturing sharp and accurate images with "true-to-life" color reproduction, even under low light conditions. The chipset of the phone was also praised by Galit, as it was powerful enough to run high-end games smoothly. He also briefly added that the battery life of this phone was not an issue, as one full charge was sufficient for a full day's use. Galit had come to the verdict that the Oppo F5 Youth was simply a more affordable version of the F5, as they possess very similar specifications, but was significantly cheaper for the performance it delivers.

== Issues ==
=== Battery ===
One of the main concerns with the battery on the Oppo F5 was that the phone did not support any type of fast charging, as it continued to use the older micro USB port.

=== Performance ===
Given that both phones were considered as mid-tier phones, their hardware and specifications would take some cutbacks, as their chipsets struggled to run the latest demanding high-end games. Moreover, the Oppo F5 Youth heated up quickly when attempting to run powerful applications.

== Availability ==
Oppo has created two variants of the Oppo F5 and Oppo F5 Youth. The Oppo F5 can come with either 4 GB RAM with 32 GB of internal storage, or 6 GB RAM with 64 GB of internal storage. The Oppo F5 Youth offers either 3 GB RAM of 4 GB RAM, both with 32 GB of internal storage.

The Oppo F5 comes in three different color options, black, red, or gold. The Oppo F5 Youth offers two color choices, which are black or gold.

Oppo has announced that they will be selling the Oppo F5 in the Philippines, India, Russia, Indonesia, Malaysia, Myanmar, Thailand, Vietnam, Pakistan, and Nepal.

The Oppo F5 was unveiled in the Philippines on 27 October 2017, putting the phone available for pre-ordering until 3 November 2017. Its official release began on 4 November 2017 onwards, with a starting price of 15,990 PHP.

The market in India had launched the 4 GB variant Oppo F5 on 2 November 2017, with a starting price of 19,990 INR. Likewise, Malaysia has also released the phone on 2 November 2017, at 1,298 MYR, and later released the 6 GB variant of the Oppo F5 on 6 December 2017, available for pre-ordering at 1,698MYR.

Other countries that have also released this phone placed its initial pricing at similar ranges as Pakistan's, whose started at 39,999 PKR, while Nepal's had settled at 33,990NPR. Russia, in particular, have launched the Oppo F5 slightly later, on 10 November 2017.
