= E140 =

E140 may refer to:

- Chlorophyll, a green pigment with E number E140
- Acer beTouch E140, a smartphone
- Toyota Corolla (E140), a car
