= List of Android smartphones =

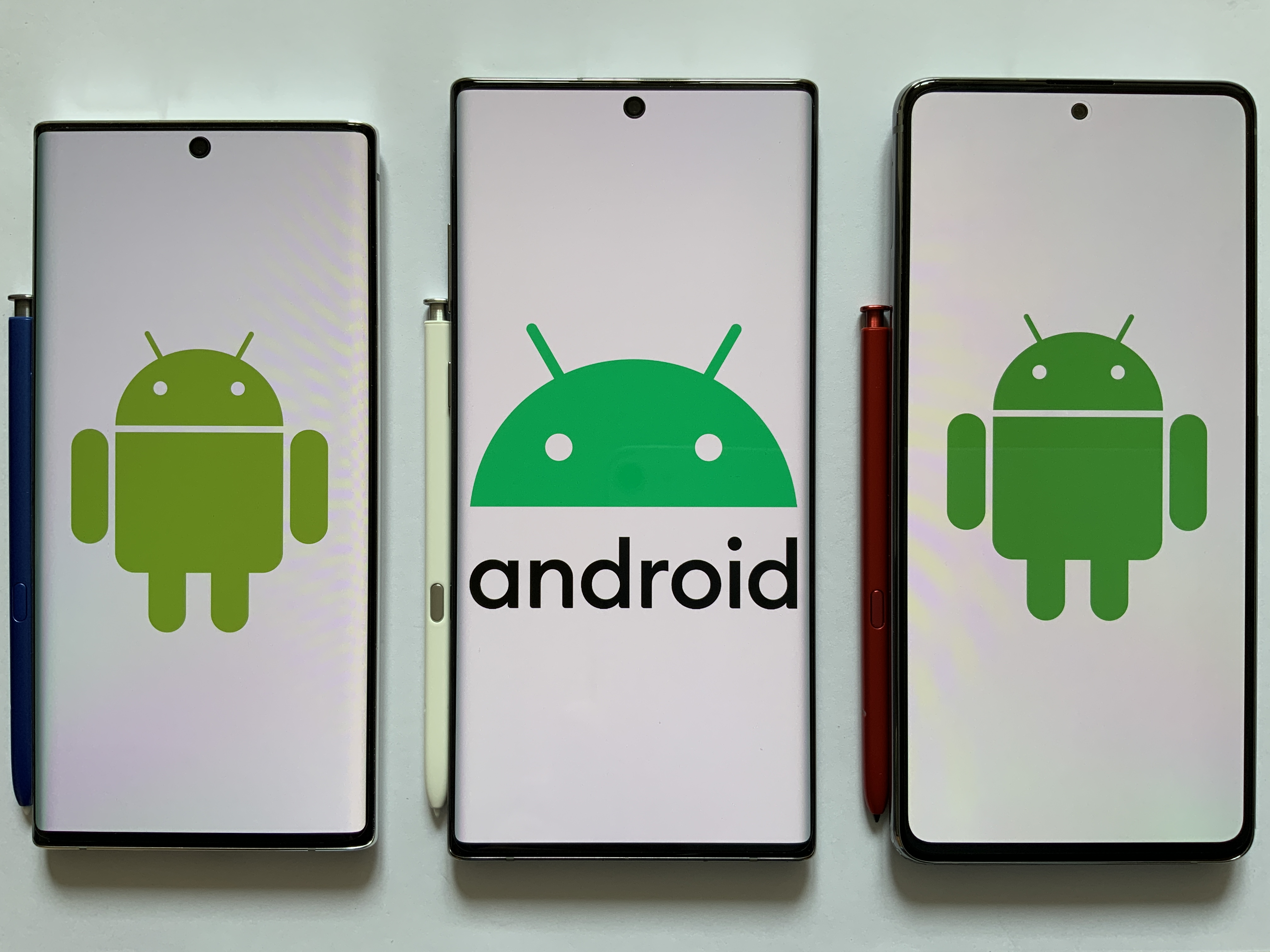
Three Samsung phones (the Galaxy Note 10, Galaxy Note 10+, and Galaxy Note 10 Lite) with the Android logos displayed on their screens

This is a list of devices that run on Android, an open source operating system for smartphones and other devices. Devices that do not run Android by default (Ex: Devices that can be modified to run Android instead of the built-in OS) are not listed here.

== A ==
Model	Developer	Release date	Android version at release	Ref.
Amazon Fire Phone	Amazon	2014/07	Android 4.2.2 Jelly Bean	
Arirang (original)	Arirang (smartphone)	2013/08	Android 4.0.4 Ice Cream Sandwich	
Arirang 171	Arirang (smartphone)	2018/04	Android 7.1.1 Nougat	
Allview X4 Soul/Style/Xtreme	Allview	2017/02 (for X4 Soul), 2017/03 (for X4 Soul Style), 2017/06 (for X4 Soul Xtreme)	Android 6.0 Marshmallow (for X4 Soul), Android 7.0 Nougat (for X4 Soul Style, X4 Soul Xtreme)	
Allview Soul X5/Pro/Style	Allview	2018/08 (for Soul X5), 2018/06 (for Soul X5 Pro), 2018/11 (for Soul X5 Style)	Android 8.1 Oreo	
Asus ZenFone 6 (2014)	Asus	2014/05	Android 4.1 Jelly Bean	
Asus PadFone S/X	Asus	2014/06	Android 4.4 KitKat	
Asus ZenFone 4.5 (2014)	Asus	2014/07	Android 4.4 KitKat	
Asus ZenFone 5 (2014)	Asus	2014/07	Android 4.4 KitKat	
Asus PadFone X mini	Asus	2014/10	Android 4.4 KitKat	
Asus Pegasus (X002)	Asus	2014/12	Android 4.4 KitKat	
Asus ZenFone 5 (2015)	Asus	2015/01	Android 4.1 Jelly Bean	
Asus ZenFone 2	Asus	2015/03	Android 5.0 Lollipop	
Asus ZenFone 3	Asus	2016/08	Android 6.0 Marshmallow	
Asus ZenFone 4	Asus	2017/10	Android 7.1 Nougat	
Asus ZenFone Max Plus (M1)	Asus	2017/11	Android 7.0 Nougat	
Asus ZenFone Max (M1)	Asus	2018/05	Android 8.0 Oreo	
Asus ZenFone Max Pro (M1)	Asus	2018/05	Android 8.1 Oreo	
Asus ZenFone 5	Asus	2018/05	Android 8.0 Oreo	
Asus ZenFone Live (L1)	Asus	2018/05	Android 8.0 Oreo	
ROG Phone	Asus	2018/10	Android 8.1 Oreo	
Asus ZenFone Lite L1	Asus	2018/10	Android 8.0 Oreo	
Asus ZenFone Max (M2)/Pro (M2)	Asus	2018/12	Android 8.1 Oreo	
Asus ZenFone Max Plus (M2)/Shot	Asus	2019/03	Android 8.1 Oreo	
Asus ZenFone Live (L2)	Asus	2019/05	Android 8.0 Oreo	
Asus ZenFone 6	Asus	2019/05	Android 9 Pie	
ROG Phone II	Asus	2019/09	Android 9 Pie	
ROG Phone 3/Strix	Asus	2020/08	Android 10	
Asus ZenFone 7	Asus	2020/09	Android 10	
ROG Phone 5/Pro/Ultimate	Asus	2021/03	Android 11	
Asus ZenFone 8/Flip	Asus	2021/05	Android 11	
Asus Smartphone for Snapdragon Insiders	Asus	2021/08	Android 11	
ROG Phone 5s/Pro	Asus	2021/08	Android 11	
ROG Phone 6/Pro	Asus	2022/07	Android 12	
Asus ZenFone 9	Asus	2022/09	Android 12	
Asus ROG Phone 6D/Ultimate	Asus	2022/10	Android 12	
ROG Phone 7/Ultimate	Asus	2023/04	Android 13	
Asus ZenFone 10	Asus	2023/07	Android 13	
ROG Phone 8/Pro/Pro Edition	Asus	2024/01	Android 14	
Asus ZenFone 11 Ultra	Asus	2024/04	Android 14	
ROG Phone 9/Pro	Asus	2024/11	Android 15	
ROG Phone 9 FE	Asus	2025/02	Android 15	
Asus ZenFone 12 Ultra	Asus	2024/04	Android 15	

== B ==
Model	Developer	Release date	Android version at release	Ref.
Balmuda Phone	Balmuda	2021/11	Android 11	
BlackBerry Priv	BlackBerry Limited	2015/11	Android 5.0 Lollipop	
BlackBerry DTEK50	BlackBerry Limited	2016/08	Android 6.0 Marshmallow	
BlackBerry DTEK60	BlackBerry Limited	2016/10	Android 6.0 Marshmallow	
BlackBerry Aurora	BlackBerry Mobile	2017/03	Android 7.0 Nougat	
BlackBerry KeyOne	BlackBerry Mobile	2017/04	Android 7.0 Nougat	
BlackBerry Motion	BlackBerry Mobile	2017/12	Android 7.0 Nougat	
BlackBerry Key2	BlackBerry Mobile	2018/06	Android 8.0 Oreo	
BlackBerry Evolve/X	BlackBerry Mobile	2018/08	Android 8.0 Oreo	
BlackBerry Key2 LE	BlackBerry Mobile	2018/10	Android 8.0 Oreo	
Black Shark	Xiaomi	2018/04	Android 8.0 Oreo	
Black Shark Helo	Xiaomi	2018/11	Android 8.0 Oreo	
Black Shark 2	Xiaomi	2019/03	Android 9 Pie	
Black Shark 2 Pro	Xiaomi	2019/08	Android 9 Pie	
Black Shark 3/Pro	Xiaomi	2020/03	Android 10	
Black Shark 3S	Xiaomi	2020/03	Android 10	
Black Shark 4/Pro	Xiaomi	2021/03	Android 11	
Black Shark 4S/Pro	Xiaomi	2021/10	Android 11	
Black Shark 5/Pro/RS	Xiaomi	2022/04	Android 12	
BoringPhone	BoringPhone	2019	Android 9 Pie	
BLU Life Pure	BLU Products	2013/12	Android 4.2 Jelly Bean	
BLU Life Pure XL	BLU Products	2014/05	Android 4.2.2 Jelly Bean	
BLU Vivo IV	BLU Products	2014/05	Android 4.2.2 Jelly Bean	
BLU Studio Energy	BLU Products	2015/01	Android 4.4.2 KitKat	
BLU Vivo Air	BLU Products	2015/01	Android 4.4.2 KitKat	
BLU Vivo 5/R	BLU Products	2016/02 (for Vivo 5), 2016/09 (for Vivo 5R)	Android 5.1 Lollipop (for Vivo 5), Android 6.0 Marshmallow (for Vivo 5R)	
BLU Energy XL	BLU Products	2016/07	Android 5.1 Lollipop	
BLU Vivo XR	BLU Products	2016/08	Android 6.0 Marshmallow	
BLU Vivo 6	BLU Products	2016/11	Android 6.0 Marshmallow	
BLU Vivo XL2	BLU Products	2017/01	Android 6.0 Marshmallow	
BLU Vivo 8	BLU Products	2017/07	Android 7.0 Nougat	
BLU Vivo X	BLU Products	2018/02	Android 7.1.1 Nougat	
BLU Vivo XI/+	BLU Products	2018/09 (for Vivo XI), 2018/08 (for Vivo XI+)	Android 8.1 Oreo	
BLU Vivo XL4	BLU Products	2018/12	Android 8.1 Oreo	

== C ==
Model	Developer	Release date	Android version at release	Ref.
Casio G'zOne Commando	NEC, Casio and Hitachi	2011/04	Android 2.3 Gingerbread	
CAT S22 Flip	CAT	2021/11	Android 11 (Go Edition)	
CAT S62 Pro	CAT	2020/09	Android 10	
Cherry Mobile Flare S7	Cherry Mobile	2018/10	Android 8.1 Oreo	
Cherry Mobile Flare S7 Power	Cherry Mobile	2018/10	Android 8.1 Oreo (Go Edition)	
Cherry Mobile Flare S7 Lite	Cherry Mobile	2018/10	Android 8.1 Oreo (Go Edition)	
Cherry Mobile Flare S7 Mini	Cherry Mobile	2018/10	Android 8.1 Oreo (Go Edition)	
Cherry Mobile Flare S7 Plus	Cherry Mobile	2018/09	Android 8.1 Oreo	
Cherry Mobile Flare S7 Prime	Cherry Mobile	2018/10	Android 8.1 Oreo (Go Edition)	
Cherry Mobile Flare S8	Cherry Mobile	2019/07	Android 9 Pie	
Cherry Mobile Flare S8 Deluxe	Cherry Mobile	2019/07	Android 9 Pie	
Cherry Mobile Flare S8 Pro	Cherry Mobile	2019/07	Android 9 Pie	
Cherry Mobile Flare S8 Plus	Cherry Mobile	2019/07	Android 9 Pie	
Cherry Mobile Flare S8 Lite	Cherry Mobile	2019/07	Android 9 Pie	
CMF Phone 1	Nothing	2024/07	Android 14	
CMF Phone 2 Pro	Nothing	2025/05	Android 15	

== D ==
Model	Developer	Release date	Android version at release	Ref.
Dior Phone Touch/Dior Revires	Dior	2011	Android 2.3 Gingerbread	

== E ==
Model	Developer	Release date	Android version at release	Ref.
Essential PH-1	Essential Products	2017/08	Android 7.0 Nougat	
Eye	ESTI	Unreleased	Android 7.1 Nougat	

== F ==
Model	Developer	Release date	Android version at release	Ref.
Fairphone 1	FairPhone	2013/04	Android 4.2 Jelly Bean	
Fairphone 2	FairPhone	2015/12	Android 5 Lollipop	
Fairphone 3	FairPhone	2019/09	Android 9 Pie	
Fairphone 3+	FairPhone	2020/08	Android 10	
Fairphone 4	FairPhone	2021/10	Android 11	
Fairphone 5	FairPhone	2023/08	Android 13	
Freedom Phone	Freedom Phone	2021/07	Android 10	

== G ==
Model	Developer	Release date	Android version at release	Ref.
Geeksphone One	Geeksphone	2010	Android 1.6 Donut	
Geeksphone Revolution	Geeksphone	2014/01	Android 4.2.2 Jelly Bean	
Blackphone	Geeksphone & Silent Circle	2014/06	Android 4.4.2 KitKat	
Garmin Nüvifone A50/Garminfone	Garmin	2010/06	Android 1.6 Donut	
Garmin Nüvifone A10	Garmin	2010/07	Android 1.6 Donut	
Gionee Elife E6	Gionee	2013/10	Android 4.2 Jelly Bean (w/ Amigo 1 skin)	
Gionee Elife E7/Mini	Gionee	2013/12 (for Elife E7), 2014/04 (for Elife E7 Mini)	Android 4.2 Jelly Bean (w/ Amigo 2 skin) (for Elife E7), Android 4.2.2 Jelly Bean (w/ Amigo 2 skin) (for Elife E7 Mini)	
Gionee Elife S5.5	Gionee	2014/03	Android 4.2 Jelly Bean (w/ Amigo 2 skin)	
Gionee Elife S5.1/Pro	Gionee	2014/11 (for Elife S5.1), 2015/11 (for Elife S5.1 Pro)	Android 4.4.2 KitKat (w/ Amigo 2 skin) (for Elife S5.1), Android 5.1.1 (Lollipop) (w/ Amigo 3 skin) (for Elife S5.1 Pro)	
Gionee Elife S7	Gionee	2015/04	Android 5.0 Lollipop (w/ Amigo 3 skin)	
Gionee S6/Pro/s	Gionee	2015/11 (for S6), 2016/06 (for S6 Pro), 2016/08 (for S6s)	Android 5.1.1 Lollipop (w/ Amigo 3.1 skin) (for S6), Android 6.0.1 Marshmallow (w/ Amigo 3.2 skin) (for S6 Pro), Android 6.0 Marshmallow (w/ Amigo 3.2 skin) (for S6s)	
Gionee Marathon M5 Plus	Gionee	2015/12	Android 5.1 Lollipop (w/ Amigo 3.1 skin)	
Gionee S8	Gionee	2016/06	Android 6.0.1 Marshmallow (w/ Amigo 3.2 skin)	
Gionee M6/Plus/s Plus	Gionee	2016/09 (for M6, M6 Plus), 2017/05 (for M6s Plus)	Android 6.0 Marshmallow (w/ Amigo 3.5 skin)	
Gionee S9	Gionee	2016/11	Android 6.0.1 Marshmallow (w/ Amigo 3.5 skin)	
Gionee M2017	Gionee	2016/12	Android 6.0.1 Marshmallow (w/ Amigo 3.5 skin)	
Gionee Steel 2	Gionee	2017/01	Android 6.0 Marshmallow (w/ Amigo 3.5 skin)	
Gionee F5	Gionee	2017/02	Android 6.0 Marshmallow (w/ Amigo 3.5 skin)	
Gionee A1/Plus/Lite	Gionee	2017/04 (for A1), 2017/05 (for A1 Plus), 2017/08 (for A1 Lite)	Android 7.0 Nougat (w/ Amigo 4 skin)	
Gionee P8 Max	Gionee	2017/06	Android 6.0 Marshmallow (w/ Amigo 3.2 skin)	
Gionee S10/B/C	Gionee	2017/07	Android 7.0 Nougat (w/ Amigo 4 skin)	
Gionee X1s	Gionee	2017/09	Android 7.0 Nougat (w/ Amigo 4 skin)	
Gionee M7/Power/Plus	Gionee	2017/09 (for M7), 2017/11 (for M7 Power), 2018/07 (for M7 Plus)	Android 7.1.1 Nougat (w/ Amigo 5 skin)	
Gionee S11/S/Lite	Gionee	2017/11	Android 7.1.1 Nougat (w/ Amigo 5 skin)	
Gionee F6	Gionee	2017/11	Android 7.1.1 Nougat (w/ Amigo 5 skin)	
Gionee F205	Gionee	2018/01	Android 7.1.1 Nougat (w/ Amigo 5 skin)	
Goophone i5	Goophone	2012/08	Android 4.0 Ice Cream Sandwich (w/ iOS 6 skin)	
Goophone i5S	Goophone	2013/03	Android 4.2 Jelly Bean	
Goophone i5C	Goophone	2013/08	Android 4.2 Jelly Bean	
Goophone i6	Goophone	2014/07	Android 4.2.2 Jelly Bean	
Goophone X	Goophone	2017/09	Android 5.0 Lollipop	
Goophone 12 Pro	Goophone	2020/09	Android 10	

== H ==
Model	Developer	Release date	Android version at release	Ref.
HTC Dream	HTC	2008/09	Android 1.0	
HTC Magic	HTC	2009/05	Android 1.6 Donut	
HTC Hero	HTC	2009/07	Android 1.5 Cupcake	
HTC Tattoo	HTC	2009/09	Android 1.6 Donut	
HTC Desire	HTC	2010/02	Android 2.0 Eclair	
HTC Legend	HTC	2010/03	Android 2.0 Eclair	
HTC Droid Incredible	HTC	2010/04	Android 2.0 Eclair	
HTC Wildfire	HTC	2010/05	Android 2.0 Eclair	
HTC Aria	HTC	2010/06	Android 2.0 Eclair	
HTC Evo 4G	HTC	2010/06	Android 2.0 Eclair	
HTC Evo 4G+	HTC	2010/06	Android 2.0 Eclair	
HTC Desire HD	HTC	2010/10	Android 2.2 Froyo	
HTC Desire Z	HTC	2010/11	Android 2.2 Froyo	
HTC Gratia	HTC	2010/11	Android 2.2 Froyo	
HTC Evo Shift 4G	HTC	2011/01	Android 2.2 Froyo	
HTC Inspire 4G	HTC	2011/02	Android 2.2 Froyo	
HTC Incredible S	HTC	2011/02	Android 2.2 Froyo	
HTC ThunderBolt	HTC	2011/03	Android 2.2 Froyo	
HTC Desire S	HTC	2011/03	Android 2.3 Gingerbread	
HTC Merge	HTC	2011/04	Android 2.2 Froyo	
HTC Sensation	HTC	2011/05	Android 2.3 Gingerbread	
HTC Wildfire S	HTC	2011/05	Android 2.3 Gingerbread	
HTC ChaCha	HTC	2011/06	Android 2.3 Gingerbread	
HTC Salsa	HTC	2011/06	Android 2.3 Gingerbread	
HTC Evo 3D	HTC	2011/07	Android 2.3 Gingerbread	
HTC Amaze 4G	HTC	2011/10	Android 2.3 Gingerbread	
HTC Explorer	HTC	2011/10	Android 2.3 Gingerbread	
HTC Sensation XE	HTC	2011/10	Android 2.3 Gingerbread	
HTC Rhyme	HTC	2011/10	Android 2.3 Gingerbread	
HTC Raider 4G	HTC	2011/10	Android 2.3 Gingerbread	
HTC Evo Design 4G	HTC	2011/10	Android 2.3 Gingerbread	
HTC Sensation XL	HTC	2011/11	Android 2.3 Gingerbread	
HTC Rezound	HTC	2011/11	Android 2.3 Gingerbread	
HTC One S	HTC	2012/04	Android 4.0 Ice Cream Sandwich	
HTC One V	HTC	2012/04	Android 4.0 Ice Cream Sandwich	
HTC One X/XL	HTC	2012/05	Android 4.0 Ice Cream Sandwich	
HTC Evo 4G LTE	HTC	2012/05	Android 4.0 Ice Cream Sandwich	
HTC One S C2	HTC	2012/06	Android 4.0 Ice Cream Sandwich	
HTC Desire C	HTC	2012/06	Android 4.0 Ice Cream Sandwich	
HTC Desire V	HTC	2012/06	Android 4.0 Ice Cream Sandwich	
HTC Droid Incredible 4G LTE	HTC	2012/07	Android 4.0 Ice Cream Sandwich	
HTC Desire VC	HTC	2012/07	Android 4.0 Ice Cream Sandwich	
HTC Desire XC	HTC	2012/07	Android 4.0 Ice Cream Sandwich	
HTC One XC	HTC	2012/08	Android 4.0 Ice Cream Sandwich	
HTC J	HTC	2012/08	Android 4.0 Ice Cream Sandwich	
HTC Desire VT	HTC	2012/08	Android 4.0 Ice Cream Sandwich	
HTC Desire X	HTC	2012/10	Android 4.0 Ice Cream Sandwich	
HTC One VX	HTC	2012/10	Android 4.0 Ice Cream Sandwich	
HTC One X+	HTC	2012/11	Android 4.1 Jelly Bean	
HTC Desire SV	HTC	2012/11	Android 4.0 Ice Cream Sandwich	
HTC Desire 400	HTC	2012/12	Android 4.1 Jelly Bean	
HTC One SV	HTC	2013/01	Android 4.0 Ice Cream Sandwich	
HTC Butterfly	HTC	2013/01	Android 4.1 Jelly Bean	
HTC One (M7)	HTC	2013/03	Android 4.1 Jelly Bean	
HTC First	HTC	2013/04	Android 4.1 Jelly Bean	
HTC Desire L/P/Q	HTC	2013/04	Android 4.1 Jelly Bean	
HTC Desire U	HTC	2013/06	Android 4.0 Ice Cream Sandwich	
HTC Desire 600	HTC	2013/06	Android 4.1 Jelly Bean	
HTC Desire 200	HTC	2013/07	Android 4.0 Ice Cream Sandwich	
HTC Butterfly S	HTC	2013/07	Android 4.1 Jelly Bean	
HTC One Mini	HTC	2013/08	Android 4.1 Jelly Bean	
HTC Desire 500	HTC	2013/09	Android 4.1 Jelly Bean	
HTC One Max	HTC	2013/10	Android 4.1 Jelly Bean	
HTC Desire 601	HTC	2013/10	Android 4.1 Jelly Bean	
HTC Desire 300	HTC	2013/12	Android 4.1 Jelly Bean	
HTC Desire 601 dual sim	HTC	2013/12	Android 4.1 Jelly Bean	
HTC Desire 700	HTC	2014/01	Android 4.1 Jelly Bean	
HTC Desire 501	HTC	2014/02	Android 4.1 Jelly Bean	
HTC Desire 816	HTC	2014/03	Android 4.4 KitKat	
HTC One (M8)	HTC	2014/03	Android 4.4 KitKat	
HTC Desire 310	HTC	2014/04	Android 4.1 Jelly Bean	
HTC Desire 610	HTC	2014/03	Android 4.4 KitKat	
HTC Desire 816 dual sim	HTC	2014/05	Android 4.4 KitKat	
HTC One Mini 2	HTC	2014/05	Android 4.4 KitKat	
HTC Desire 210	HTC	2014/06	Android 4.1 Jelly Bean	
HTC Desire 616	HTC	2014/06	Android 4.1 Jelly Bean	
HTC One (E8)	HTC	2014/06	Android 4.4 KitKat	
HTC Desire 516	HTC	2014/06	Android 4.1 Jelly Bean	
HTC One Remix	HTC	2014/07	Android 4.4 KitKat	
HTC Butterfly 2	HTC	2014/09	Android 4.4 KitKat	
HTC Desire 510	HTC	2014/09	Android 4.4 KitKat	
HTC Desire 820q	HTC	2014/10	Android 4.4 KitKat	
HTC Desire 612	HTC	2014/10	Android 4.4 KitKat	
HTC One (M8 Eye)	HTC	2014/10	Android 4.4 KitKat	
HTC Desire 816G	HTC	2014/10	Android 4.4 KitKat	
HTC Desire 820	HTC	2014/11	Android 4.4 KitKat	
HTC Desire Eye	HTC	2014/11	Android 4.4 KitKat	
HTC Desire 620/G	HTC	2014/12	Android 4.4 KitKat	
HTC Desire 320	HTC	2015/01	Android 4.4 KitKat	
HTC Desire 526G+	HTC	2015/01	Android 4.4 KitKat	
HTC Desire 826	HTC	2015/03	Android 5.0 Lollipop	
HTC Desire 626	HTC	2015/03	Android 4.4 KitKat	
HTC Desire 820s	HTC	2015/03	Android 4.4 KitKat	
HTC Desire 626G+	HTC	2015/04	Android 4.4 KitKat	
HTC One M9	HTC	2015/03	Android 5.0 Lollipop	
HTC One E9/+	HTC	2015/05	Android 5.0 Lollipop	
HTC One M8s	HTC	2015/05	Android 5.0 Lollipop	
HTC One M9+	HTC	2015/05	Android 5.0 Lollipop	
HTC Desire 326G	HTC	2015/06	Android 4.4 KitKat	
HTC Desire 820G+	HTC	2015/06	Android 4.4 KitKat	
HTC One ME	HTC	2015/07	Android 5.0 Lollipop	
HTC Desire 626s	HTC	2015/07	Android 5.0 Lollipop	
HTC Desire 526	HTC	2015/08	Android 5.0 Lollipop	
HTC Desire 626 (USA)	HTC	2015/08	Android 5.0 Lollipop	
HTC One M9+ Supreme Camera Edition	HTC	2015/10	Android 5.0 Lollipop	
HTC Butterfly 3	HTC	2015/10	Android 5.0 Lollipop	
HTC One E9s	HTC	2015/10	Android 5.0 Lollipop	
HTC One A9	HTC	2015/10	Android 6.0 Marshmallow	
HTC Desire 520	HTC	2015/11	Android 5.0 Lollipop	
HTC Desire 728	HTC	2015/11	Android 5.0 Lollipop	
HTC Desire 828	HTC	2015/11	Android 5.0 Lollipop	
HTC One M9s	HTC	2015/11	Android 5.0 Lollipop	
HTC One X9	HTC	2016/01	Android 6.0 Marshmallow	
HTC Desire 530	HTC	2016/03	Android 6.0 Marshmallow	
HTC Desire 825	HTC	2016/04	Android 6.0 Marshmallow	
HTC 10	HTC	2016/04	Android 6.0 Marshmallow	
HTC Desire 830	HTC	2016/05	Android 6.0 Marshmallow	
HTC One M9 Prime Camera	HTC	2016/05	Android 5.0 Lollipop	
HTC Desire 630	HTC	2016/06	Android 6.0 Marshmallow	
HTC 10 Lifestyle	HTC	2016/06	Android 6.0 Marshmallow	
HTC One S9	HTC	2016/06	Android 6.0 Marshmallow	
HTC Desire 628	HTC	2016/06	Android 5.0 Lollipop	
HTC Desire 625	HTC	2016/08	Android 5.0 Lollipop	
HTC Desire 10 Lifestyle	HTC	2016/09	Android 6.0 Marshmallow	
HTC Desire 728 Ultra	HTC	2016/12	Android 6.0 Marshmallow	
HTC One A9s	HTC	2016/11	Android 6.0 Marshmallow	
HTC 10 evo	HTC	2016/11	Android 6.0 Marshmallow	
HTC Desire 10 Pro	HTC	2016/12	Android 6.0 Marshmallow	
HTC Desire 650	HTC	2016/12	Android 6.0 Marshmallow	
HTC U Play	HTC	2017/02	Android 6.0 Marshmallow	
HTC U Ultra	HTC	2017/02	Android 7.0 Nougat	
HTC U11	HTC	2017/06	Android 7.0 Nougat	
HTC One X10	HTC	2017/07	Android 6.0 Marshmallow	
HTC U11+/Life	HTC	2017/11	Android 8.0 Oreo	
HTC U11 EYEs	HTC	2018/01	Android 8.0 Oreo	
HTC U12+	HTC	2018/06	Android 8.0 Oreo	
HTC U12 life	HTC	2018/08	Android 8.0 Oreo	
HTC Desire 12/12+	HTC	2018/09	Android 8.0 Oreo	
HTC Exodus 1	HTC	2018/12	Android 8.0 Oreo	
HTC Desire 12s	HTC	2018/12	Android 8.0 Oreo	
HTC Desire 19+	HTC	2019/06	Android 9 Pie	
HTC U19e	HTC	2019/06	Android 9 Pie	
HTC Wildfire X	HTC	2019/08	Android 9 Pie	
HTC Exodus 1s	HTC	2019/10	Android 8.0 Oreo	
HTC Desire 19s	HTC	2019/11	Android 9 Pie	
HTC Wildfire R70	HTC	2020/02	Android 9 Pie	
HTC Desire 20 Pro	HTC	2020/06	Android 10	
HTC Wildfire E2	HTC	2020/08	Android 10	
HTC U20 5G	HTC	2020/10	Android 10	
HTC Desire 20+	HTC	2020/10	Android 10	
HTC Desire 21 Pro 5G	HTC	2021/01	Android 10	
HTC Wildfire E3	HTC	2021/05	Android 10	
HTC Wildfire E2 Plus	HTC	2021/12	Android 11	
HTC Desire 22 Pro	HTC	2022/07	Android 12	
HTC Wildfire E Plus	HTC	2022/10	Android 12	
HTC Wildfire E3 lite	HTC	2023/04	Android 12	
HTC Wildfire E2 Play	HTC	2023/04	Android 12	
HTC U23 Pro	HTC	2023/05	Android 13	
HTC U23	HTC	2023/07	Android 13	
HTC Wildfire E star	HTC	2023/08	Android 12	
HTC U24 Pro	HTC	2024/07	Android 14	
HTC/Google Sooner	HTC/Google	Unreleased (2007 prototypes)	Android htc-2065.0.8.0.0 build (oldest known build seen on the device)	
Honor U8860	Huawei	2011/09	Android 2.3 Gingerbread	
Honor 2	Huawei	2012/10	Android 4.0 Ice Cream Sandwich	
Honor 3	Huawei	2013/08	Android 4.1 Jelly Bean	
Honor 3C	Huawei	2013/12	Android 4.1 Jelly Bean	
Honor 3X	Huawei	2013/12	Android 4.4 KitKat	
Honor 3X Pro	Huawei	2014/05	Android 4.1 Jelly Bean	
Honor 3C 4G	Huawei	2014/06	Android 4.4 KitKat	
Honor 6	Huawei	2014/08	Android 4.4 KitKat	
Honor 3C Play	Huawei	2014/09	Android 4.1 Jelly Bean	
Honor 4 Play	Huawei	2014/09	Android 4.4 KitKat	
Honor Holly	Huawei	2014/10	Android 4.4 KitKat	
Honor 4X	Huawei	2014/10	Android 4.4 KitKat	
Honor 6 Plus	Huawei	2014/12	Android 4.4 KitKat	
Honor 4C	Huawei	2015/04	Android 4.4 KitKat	
Honor Bee	Huawei	2015/05	Android 4.4 KitKat	
Honor 7	Huawei	2015/07	Android 5.0 Lollipop	
Honor 7i	Huawei	2015/08	Android 5.0 Lollipop	
Honor 5X	Huawei	2015/11	Android 5.0 Lollipop	
Honor Holly 2 Plus	Huawei	2016/01	Android 5.0 Lollipop	
Honor 5c	Huawei	2016/04	Android 6.0 Marshmallow	
Honor V8	Huawei	2016/05	Android 6.0 Marshmallow	
Honor 5A	Huawei	2016/06	Android 5.0 Lollipop	
Honor 8	Huawei	2016/07	Android 6.0 Marshmallow	
Honor Note 8	Huawei	2016/08	Android 6.0 Marshmallow	
Honor Holly 3	Huawei	2016/07	Android 6.0 Marshmallow	
Honor 6X	Huawei	2016/10	Android 6.0 Marshmallow	
Honor Magic	Huawei	2016/12	Android 6.0 Marshmallow	
Honor 8 Pro	Huawei	2017/04	Android 7.0 Nougat	
Honor 6A	Huawei	2017/05	Android 7.0 Nougat	
Honor 9	Huawei	2017/07	Android 7.0 Nougat	
Honor 6C Pro	Huawei	2017/10	Android 7.0 Nougat	
Honor 7X	Huawei	2017/12	Android 7.0 Nougat	
Honor V10	Huawei	2017/12	Android 8.0 Oreo	
Honor 9 Lite	Huawei	2017/12	Android 8.0 Oreo	
Honor 7A	Huawei	2018/04	Android 8.0 Oreo	
Honor 7C	Huawei	2018/05	Android 8.0 Oreo	
Honor 10	Huawei	2018/05	Android 8.0 Oreo	
Honor 7S	Huawei	2018/05	Android 8.0 Oreo	
Honor 9N	Huawei	2018/07	Android 8.0 Oreo	
Honor Play	Huawei	2018/08	Android 8.0 Oreo	
Honor Note 10	Huawei	2018/08	Android 8.0 Oreo	
Honor 8X/Max	Huawei	2018/09	Android 8.0 Oreo	
Honor 8C	Huawei	2018/10	Android 8.0 Oreo	
Honor Magic 2/3D	Huawei	2018/08	Android 9 Pie	
Honor 10 Lite	Huawei	2018/11	Android 9 Pie	
Honor V20	Huawei	2018/12	Android 9 Pie	
Honor Play 8A	Huawei	2019/01	Android 9 Pie	
Honor 8A Pro	Huawei	2019/04	Android 9 Pie	
Honor 20 lite	Huawei	2019/05	Android 9 Pie	
Honor 20i	Huawei	2019/05	Android 9 Pie	
Honor 20	Huawei	2019/06	Android 9 Pie	
Honor 20 Pro	Huawei	2019/07	Android 9 Pie	
Honor 9X (China)	Huawei	2019/07	Android 9 Pie	
Honor 9X Pro	Huawei	2019/07	Android 9 Pie	
Honor Play 3/3e	Huawei	2019/09	Android 9 Pie	
Honor 20S	Huawei	2019/09	Android 9 Pie	
Honor 20 lite (China)	Huawei	2019/10	Android 9 Pie	
Honor 9X	Huawei	2019/10	Android 9 Pie	
Honor V30/30 Pro	Huawei	2019/11	Android 10	
Honor 8A Prime	Huawei	2020/03	Android 10	
Honor Play 9A	Huawei	2020/03	Android 10	
Honor 30S	Huawei	2020/03	Android 10	
Honor Play 4T/Pro	Huawei	2020/04	Android 10	
Honor 8A 2020	Huawei	2020/04	Android 10	
Honor 20e	Huawei	2020/04	Android 10	
Honor 30/Pro/Pro+	Huawei	2020/04	Android 10	
Honor 9X Lite	Huawei	2020/04	Android 10	
Honor 9C/9S/9A	Huawei	2020/04	Android 10	
Honor X10	Huawei	2020/05	Android 10	
Honor 8S 2020	Huawei	2020/05	Android 10	
Honor Play4/Pro	Huawei	2020/06	Android 10	
Honor 30 Lite	Huawei	2020/07	Android 10	
Honor X10 Max	Huawei	2020/07	Android 10	
Honor 30i	Huawei	2020/09	Android 10	
Honor 10X Lite	Huawei	2020/10	Android 10	
Honor V40	Honor	2021/01	Android 10	
Honor V40 Lite	Honor	2021/03	Android 10	
Honor Play 5T Youth	Honor	2021/04	Android 10	
Honor Play 20	Honor	2021/05	Android 10	
Honor Play 5	Honor	2021/05	Android 10	
Honor 50/Pro	Honor	2021/06	Android 11	
Honor 50 SE	Honor	2021/07	Android 11	
Honor X20 SE	Honor	2021/07	Android 11	
Honor Play 5T Pro	Honor	2021/08	Android 11	
Honor Magic3/Pro/Pro+	Honor	2021/08	Android 11	
Honor X20	Honor	2021/08	Android 11	
Honor Play 5 Youth	Honor	2021/11	Android 11	
Honor 50 Lite	Honor	2021/11	Android 11	
Honor X30 Max/X30i	Honor	2021/08	Android 11	
Honor 60/Pro	Honor	2021/12	Android 11	
Honor X30	Honor	2021/12	Android 11	
Honor Play 30 Plus	Honor	2022/01	Android 11	
Honor Magic V6	Honor	2026/03	Android 16	
Huawei U8230	Huawei	2010/03	Android 2.0 Eclair	
Huawei U8100	Huawei	2010/07	Android 2.0 Eclair	
Huawei IDEOS	Huawei	2010/09	Android 2.2 Froyo	
Huawei IDEOS X5	Huawei	2011/04	Android 2.2 Froyo	
Huawei Sonic	Huawei	2011/07	Android 2.3 Gingerbread	
Huawei Ascend P1	Huawei	2012/07	Android 4.0 Ice Cream Sandwich	
Huawei STREAM X GL07S	Huawei	2013/02	Android 4.1 Jelly Bean	
Huawei Ascend Mate	Huawei	2013/03	Android 4.1 Jelly Bean	
Huawei Ascend P2	Huawei	2013/04	Android 4.1 Jelly Bean	
Huawei Ascend P6	Huawei	2013/06	Android 4.1 Jelly Bean	
Huawei Ascend Mate 2 4G	Huawei	2014/01	Android 4.1 Jelly Bean	
Huawei Ascend P7	Huawei	2014/06	Android 4.4 KitKat	
Huawei Enjoy 7 Plus	Huawei	2011/09	Android 7.0 Nougat	
Huawei Ascend Mate 7	Huawei	2014/10	Android 4.4 KitKat	
Huawei P8	Huawei	2015/04	Android 4.4 KitKat	
Huawei Mate S	Huawei	2015/10	Android 5.0 Lollipop	
Huawei Mate 8	Huawei	2015/11	Android 6.0 Marshmallow	
Huawei P9	Huawei	2016/04	Android 6.0 Marshmallow	
Huawei Nova/Plus	Huawei	2016/10	Android 6.0 Marshmallow	
Huawei Mate 9	Huawei	2016/12	Android 7.0 Nougat	
Huawei P10	Huawei	2017/02	Android 7.0 Nougat	
Huawei Nova 2/Plus	Huawei	2017/06	Android 7.0 Nougat	
Huawei Mate 10 Lite	Huawei	2017/11	Android 7.0 Nougat	
Huawei Mate 10	Huawei	2017/11	Android 8.0 Oreo	
Huawei P20	Huawei	2018/03	Android 8.0 Oreo	
Huawei Nova 3i/P Smart+	Huawei	2018/07	Android 8.0 Oreo	
Huawei Nova 3	Huawei	2018/08	Android 8.0 Oreo	
Huawei Mate 20	Huawei	2018/11	Android 9 Pie	
Huawei Nova 4	Huawei	2018/12	Android 9 Pie	
Huawei Nova 4e	Huawei	2019/03	Android 9 Pie	
Huawei P30	Huawei	2019/03	Android 9 Pie	
Huawei P30 lite	Huawei	2019/04	Android 9 Pie	
Huawei Nova 5/5i/Pro	Huawei	2019/06	Android 9 Pie	
Huawei Nova 5i Pro	Huawei	2019/07	Android 9 Pie	
Huawei Nova 5T	Huawei	2019/09	Android 9 Pie	
Huawei Mate 30	Huawei	2019/09	Android 10	
Huawei Nova 5z	Huawei	2019/11	Android 9 Pie	
Huawei Nova 6/5G/SE	Huawei	2019/12	Android 10	
Huawei Y7p	Huawei	2020/02	Android 9 Pie	
Huawei Nova 7i	Huawei	2020/02	Android 9 Pie	
Huawei P40 lite	Huawei	2020/03	Android 10	
Huawei P40 lite E	Huawei	2020/03	Android 9 Pie	
Huawei P40	Huawei	2020/04	Android 10	
Huawei Nova 7/Pro/SE	Huawei	2020/04	Android 10	
Huawei P40 lite 5G	Huawei	2020/05	Android 10	
Huawei Nova 7 SE 5G Youth	Huawei	2020/10	Android 10	
Huawei Mate 40	Huawei	2020/11	Android 10	
Huawei Nova 8 SE	Huawei	2020/11	Android 10	
Huawei Nova 8 5G/Pro	Huawei	2020/12	Android 10	
Huawei Mate X2	Huawei	2021/02	Android 10	
Huawei Nova 8 Pro 4G	Huawei	2021/05	Android 10	
Huawei Nova 8i	Huawei	2021/07	Android 10	
Huawei Nova 8 SE Youth	Huawei	2021/08	Android 10	
Huawei P50/Pro	Huawei	2021/08	Android 11	
Huawei Enjoy 20e	Huawei	2021/08	Android 10	
Huawei Nova 9	Huawei	2021/09	Android 11	
Huawei Nova Y60	Huawei	2021/09	Android 10	
Huawei P50 Pocket	Huawei	2021/12	Android 11	
Huawei Nova 9 SE	Huawei	2022/03	Android 11	
Huawei Nova 9 SE 5G	Huawei	2022/04	Android 11	
Huawei Nova Y70/Plus	Huawei	2022/05	Android 11	
Huawei Nova Y90	Huawei	2022/07	Android 11	
Huawei Mate Xs 2	Huawei	2022/07	Android 11	
Huawei Nova 10	Huawei	2022/07	Android 11	
Huawei Mate 50/Pro/RS	Huawei	2022/09	Android 12	
Huawei Nova 10 SE	Huawei	2022/10	Android 11	
Huawei Nova Y61	Huawei	2022/11	Android 11	

== I ==
Model	Developer	Release date	Android version at release	Ref.
Infinix Zero	Infinix Mobile	2014/09	Android 4.4.2 KitKat	
Infinix Hot S	Infinix Mobile	2016/06	Android 6.0 Marshmallow	
Infinix Note 3/Pro	Infinix Mobile	2016/07	Android 6.0 Marshmallow	
Infinix Zero 5/Pro	Infinix Mobile	2018	Android 7.0 Nougat	
Infinix Note 5/Stylus	Infinix Mobile	2018	Android 8.1 Oreo (w/ Android One skin)	
Infinix Hot 7/Pro	Infinix Mobile	2019/01 (for Hot 7), 2019/03 (for Hot 7 Pro)	Android 8.1 Oreo (for Hot 7), Android 9.0 Pie (for Hot 7 Pro)	
Infinix Zero 6/Pro	Infinix Mobile	2019/03	Android 8.1 Oreo	
Infinix S4	Infinix Mobile	2019/04	Android 9.0 Pie	
Infinix Note 7/Lite	Infinix Mobile	2020/07	Android 10	
Infinix Zero 8/i	Infinix Mobile	2020/08 (for Zero 8), 2020/12 (for Zero 8i)	Android 10	
Infinix Note 8/i	Infinix Mobile	2020/11	Android 10	
Infinix Zero Ultra	Infinix Mobile	2022/10	Android 12	
Infinix Zero 20	Infinix Mobile	2023/01	Android 12	
Infinix Zero 30 4G/5G	Infinix Mobile	2023/10 (for Zero 30 4G), 2023/09 (for Zero 30 5G)	Android 13	
Infinix Zero 40 4G/5G	Infinix Mobile	2024/09	Android 14	
Infinix Zero Flip	Infinix Mobile	2024/10	Android 14	
Infinix Hot 50 Pro+	Infinix Mobile	2024/11	Android 14	
Infinix Note 50/Pro/Pro+	Infinix Mobile	2025/03 (for Note 50, Note 50 Pro), 2025/04 (for Note 50 Pro+)	Android 15	
Infinix GT 30/Pro	Infinix Mobile	2025/08 (for GT 30), 2025/06 (for GT 30 Pro)	Android 15	
Infinix Hot 60 Pro+	Infinix Mobile	2025/07	Android 15	
Infinix Note Edge	Infinix Mobile	2026/01	Android 16	
Infinix Note 60/Pro/Ultra	Infinix Mobile	2026/03 (for Note 60, Note 60 Pro), 2026/05 (for Note 60 Ultra)	Android 16	
iQOO 3	Vivo	2020/03	Android 10	
iQOO U1	Vivo	2020/07	Android 10	
iQOO 5	Vivo	2020/08	Android 10	
iQOO 8/Pro	Vivo	2021/08	Android 11	
iQOO 9/SE	Vivo	2022/02	Android 12	
iQOO Z6 Lite	Vivo	2022/09	Android 12	
iQOO 12	Vivo	2023/11	Android 14	
iQOO Neo9	Vivo	2023/12	Android 14	
iQOO 13	Vivo	2024/11	Android 15	
iQOO Neo10 (China)	Vivo	2024/11	Android 15	
iQOO Z10/x/Lite/R (India)	Vivo	2025/04 (for Z10, Z10x), 2025/06 (for Z10 Lite), 2025/07 (for Z10R India)	Android 15	
iQOO Z10 Turbo/Pro/+	Vivo	2025/04 (for Z10 Turbo, Z10 Turbo Pro), 2025/08 (for Z10 Turbo+)	Android 15	
iQOO 15	Vivo	2025/10	Android 16	
iQOO 16	Vivo	2026/09	Android 17	
itel S42	itel Mobile	2018/03	Android 8.0 Oreo	
itel P36/Pro	itel Mobile	2020/06	Android 9.0 Pie	
itel P37/Pro	itel Mobile	2021/05	Android 10	
itel P38/Pro	itel Mobile	2022/05	Android 11	
itel S23+	itel Mobile	2023/09	Android 13	
itel P55/+/T	itel Mobile	2023/11 (for P55), 2024/02 (for P55+, P55T)	(Android 13 for P55, P55+), (Android 14 for P55T)	
itel S24/RS4	itel Mobile	2024/04	Android 13	
itel S25/Ultra	itel Mobile	2024/11	Android 14	
itel Power 70	itel Mobile	2025/03	Android 14	
itel City 100	itel Mobile	2025/04	Android 14	
itel Super 26 Ultra	itel Mobile	2025/09	Android 15	
itel City 200/s	itel Mobile	2026/02 (for City 200), 2026/06 (for City 200s)	Android 15	
itel Power 80	itel Mobile	2026/06	Android 16	

== J ==
Model	Developer	Release date	Android version at release	Ref.
Jupiter IO 3	Vaporcade	2016/01	Android 4.4 KitKat	

== K ==
Model	Developer	Release date	Android version at release	Ref.
Kodak Ektra	Kodak	2017/07	Android 6.0 Marshmallow	
Kyocera DuraForce	Kyocera	2014/11	Android 4.4.2 KitKat	
Kyocera DuraForce Pro 2	Kyocera	2018/11	Android 8.0 Oreo	

== L ==
Model	Developer	Release date	Android version at release	Ref.
Leitz Phone 1	Leica	2021/07	Android 11	
Leitz Phone 2	Leica	2022/11	Android 12	
Leitz Phone 3	Leica	2024/04	Android 14	
Lenovo P780	Lenovo	2013/06	Android 4.1 Jelly Bean	
Lenovo Vibe Z	Lenovo	2013/11	Android 4.1 Jelly Bean	
Lenovo A526	Lenovo	2014/06	Android 4.1 Jelly Bean	
Lenovo Vibe Z2 Pro	Lenovo	2014/08	Android 4.4 KitKat	
Lenovo Vibe Z2	Lenovo	2014/09	Android 4.4 KitKat	
ZUK Z1	Lenovo	2015/08	Android 5.0 Lollipop	
Lenovo Vibe P1	Lenovo	2015/09	Android 5.0 Lollipop	
Lenovo Vibe K4 Note	Lenovo	2016/01	Android 5.0 Lollipop	
Lenovo K5 Note	Lenovo	2016/01	Android 5.0 Lollipop	
Lenovo Vibe P1 Turbo	Lenovo	2016/02	Android 5.0 Lollipop	
Lenovo Vibe K5/Plus	Lenovo	2016/02	Android 5.0 Lollipop	
ZUK Z2	Lenovo	2016/05	Android 6.0 Marshmallow	
Lenovo Phab 2/Plus/Pro	Lenovo	2016/06	Android 6.0 Marshmallow	
Lenovo K6/Power/Note	Lenovo	2016/09	Android 6.0 Marshmallow	
Lenovo P2	Lenovo	2016/09	Android 6.0 Marshmallow	
Lenovo Z2 Plus	Lenovo	2017/01	Android 6.0 Marshmallow	
Lenovo Legion Pro	Lenovo	2020/07	Android 10	
Lenovo Legion Duel	Lenovo	2020/10	Android 10	
Lenovo Legion 2 Pro	Lenovo	2021/04	Android 11	
Lenovo Legion Duel 2	Lenovo	2021/05	Android 11	
Lenovo Legion Y90	Lenovo	2022/03	Android 12	
Lenovo Legion Y70	Lenovo	2022/08	Android 12	
LG GW620	LG Electronics	2009/11	Android 1.5 Cupcake	
LG Optimus Q	LG Electronics	2010/05	Android 2.0 Eclair	
LG Optimus	LG Electronics	2010/06	Android 1.6 Donut	
LG Optimus One	LG Electronics	2010/10	Android 2.2 Froyo	
LG Optimus Chic	LG Electronics	2010/11	Android 2.2 Froyo	
LG Optimus 2X	LG Electronics	2011/02	Android 2.2 Froyo	
LG Optimus Black	LG Electronics	2011/05	Android 2.2 Froyo	
LG Optimus 3D	LG Electronics	2011/07	Android 2.2 Froyo	
LG Optimus Slider	LG Electronics	2011/10	Android 2.3 Gingerbread	
LG Optimus LTE (LU6200)	LG Electronics	2012/01	Android 2.3 Gingerbread	
LG Optimus 4X HD	LG Electronics	2012/06	Android 4.0 Ice Cream Sandwich	
LG Optimus LTE (SU640)	LG Electronics	2012/08	Android 2.3 Gingerbread	
LG Optimus L9	LG Electronics	2012/11	Android 4.0 Ice Cream Sandwich	
LG Optimus Vu	LG Electronics	2012/11	Android 4.0 Ice Cream Sandwich	
LG Optimus G	LG Electronics	2013/01	Android 4.0 Ice Cream Sandwich	
LG G2	LG Electronics	2013/09	Android 4.2.2 Jelly Bean	
LG G Flex	LG Electronics	2013/11	Android 4.2.2 Jelly Bean	
LG G Pro Lite	LG Electronics	2013/11	Android 4.1.2 Jelly Bean	
LG Gx	LG Electronics	2014/01	Android 4.3 Jelly Bean	
LG G2 Mini	LG Electronics	2014/04	Android 4.4 KitKat	
LG G Pro 2	LG Electronics	2014/04	Android 4.4 KitKat	
LG G3	LG Electronics	2014/05	Android 4.4 KitKat	
LG G3 Stylus	LG Electronics	2014/10	Android 4.4 KitKat	
LG G Flex 2	LG Electronics	2015/02	Android 5.0 Lollipop	
LG G4	LG Electronics	2015/04	Android 5.1 Lollipop	
LG V10	LG Electronics	2015/10	Android 5.1 Lollipop	
LG K10	LG Electronics	2016/01	Android 5.1 Lollipop	
LG G5	LG Electronics	2016/04	Android 6.0 Marshmallow	
LG V20	LG Electronics	2016/10	Android 7.0 Nougat	
LG K10 (2017)	LG Electronics	2017/02	Android 7.0 Nougat	
LG G6	LG Electronics	2017/05	Android 7.0 Nougat	
LG V30	LG Electronics	2017/10	Android 7.1 Nougat	
LG G7 ThinQ	LG Electronics	2018/05	Android 8.0 Oreo	
LG V35 ThinQ	LG Electronics	2018/06	Android 8.0 Oreo	
LG K10 (2018)	LG Electronics	2018/06	Android 7.1.2 Nougat	
LG V40 ThinQ	LG Electronics	2018/10	Android 8.1 Oreo	
LG G8 ThinQ	LG Electronics	2019/04	Android 9 Pie	
LG V50 ThinQ	LG Electronics	2019/05	Android 9 Pie	
LG Stylo 5	LG Electronics	2019/06	Android 9 Pie	
LG W10/W30	LG Electronics	2019/07	Android 9 Pie	
LG W30 Pro	LG Electronics	2019/10	Android 9 Pie	
LG W10 Alpha	LG Electronics	2020/02	Android 9 Pie	
LG Q51	LG Electronics	2020/02	Android 10	
LG V60 ThinQ	LG Electronics	2020/03	Android 10	
LG Velvet	LG Electronics	2020/05	Android 10	
LG Stylo 6	LG Electronics	2020/05	Android 10	
LG Q61	LG Electronics	2020/05	Android 10	
LG K31	LG Electronics	2020/08	Android 10	
LG Q92 5G	LG Electronics	2020/08	Android 10	
LG K22	LG Electronics	2020/09	Android 10	
LG K42/K71	LG Electronics	2020/09	Android 10	
LG Q31	LG Electronics	2020/09	Android 10	
LG Wing	LG Electronics	2020/10	Android 10	
LG Q52	LG Electronics	2020/10	Android 10	
LG K52/K62	LG Electronics	2020/11	Android 10	
LG K92 5G	LG Electronics	2020/11	Android 10	
LG W31/+	LG Electronics	2020/12	Android 10	
LG W41/+/Pro	LG Electronics	2021/03	Android 10	

== M ==
Model	Developer	Release date	Android version at release	Ref.
Marshall London	Marshall Amplification	2015	Android 5.0.2 Lollipop	
Meizu M9	Meizu	2011/01	Android 2.2 Froyo	
Meizu MX	Meizu	2011/12	Android 2.3 Gingerbread	
Meizu MX 4-core	Meizu	2012/06	Android 4.0 Ice Cream Sandwich	
Meizu MX2	Meizu	2012/11	Android 4.1 Jelly Bean	
Meizu MX3	Meizu	2013/09	Android 4.1 Jelly Bean	
Meizu MX4	Meizu	2014/09	Android 4.4 KitKat	
Meizu MX4 Pro	Meizu	2014/10	Android 4.4 KitKat	
Meizu M1/1 Note	Meizu	2015/01	Android 4.4 KitKat	
Meizu M2 Note	Meizu	2015/06	Android 5.0 Lollipop	
Meizu MX5	Meizu	2015/06	Android 5.0 Lollipop	
Meizu M2	Meizu	2015/07	Android 5.0 Lollipop	
Meizu PRO 5	Meizu	2015/09	Android 5.0 Lollipop	
Meizu M1 Metal	Meizu	2015/10	Android 5.0 Lollipop	
Meizu MX5e	Meizu	2016/04	Android 6.0 Marshmallow	
Meizu M3 Note	Meizu	2016/04	Android 5.0 Lollipop	
Meizu PRO 6	Meizu	2016/04	Android 6.0 Marshmallow	
Meizu M3	Meizu	2016/04	Android 5.0 Lollipop	
Meizu M3s	Meizu	2016/06	Android 5.0 Lollipop	
Meizu MX6	Meizu	2016/07	Android 6.0 Marshmallow	
Meizu M3E	Meizu	2016/08	Android 5.0 Lollipop	
Meizu U10/20	Meizu	2016/08	Android 6.0 Marshmallow	
Meizu M3 Max	Meizu	2016/09	Android 6.0 Marshmallow	
Meizu M5	Meizu	2016/10	Android 6.0 Marshmallow	
Meizu PRO 6s	Meizu	2016/11	Android 6.0 Marshmallow	
Meizu M3x	Meizu	2016/11	Android 6.0 Marshmallow	
Meizu PRO 6 Plus	Meizu	2016/11	Android 6.0 Marshmallow	
Meizu M5 Note	Meizu	2016/12	Android 6.0 Marshmallow	
Meizu M5s	Meizu	2017/02	Android 6.0 Marshmallow	
Meizu E2	Meizu	2017/04	Android 7.0 Nougat	
Meizu M5c	Meizu	2017/05	Android 6.0 Marshmallow	
Meizu PRO 7/Plus	Meizu	2017/07	Android 7.0 Nougat	
Meizu M6 Note	Meizu	2017/08	Android 7.0 Nougat	
Meizu M6	Meizu	2017/09	Android 7.0 Nougat	
Meizu M6s	Meizu	2018/01	Android 7.0 Nougat	
Meizu E3	Meizu	2018/03	Android 7.0 Nougat	
Meizu 15/Pro/Lite	Meizu	2018/04	Android 7.0 Nougat	
Meizu M8c	Meizu	2018/05	Android 7.0 Nougat	
Meizu M6T	Meizu	2018/05	Android 7.0 Nougat	
Meizu 16th/Plus	Meizu	2018/08	Android 8.0 Oreo	
Meizu 16X	Meizu	2018/09	Android 8.0 Oreo	
Meizu V8/Pro	Meizu	2018/09	Android 8.0 Oreo	
Meizu X8	Meizu	2018/09	Android 8.0 Oreo	
Meizu Note 8	Meizu	2018/10	Android 8.0 Oreo	
Meizu C9/Pro	Meizu	2018/12	Android 8.0 Oreo	
Meizu Note 9	Meizu	2019/03	Android 9 Pie	
Meizu M10	Meizu	2019/09	Android 9 Pie	
Meizu 16s	Meizu	2019/04	Android 9 Pie	
Meizu 16Xs	Meizu	2019/05	Android 9 Pie	
Meizu 16s Pro	Meizu	2019/08	Android 9 Pie	
Meizu 16T	Meizu	2019/10	Android 9 Pie	
Meizu 17/Pro	Meizu	2020/05	Android 10	
Meizu 18/Pro	Meizu	2021/03	Android 11	
Meizu 18s/Pro	Meizu	2021/09	Android 11	
Meizu 18X	Meizu	2021/09	Android 11	
Mode Phone MP1	Mode	2021	Android 10	
Motorola Cliq	Motorola	2009/10	Android 1.5 Cupcake	
Motorola Droid	Motorola	2009/11	Android 2.0 Eclair	
Motorola Backflip	Motorola	2010/03	Android 1.5 Cupcake	
Motorola Flipout	Motorola	2010/06	Android 2.0 Eclair	
Motorola Droid X	Motorola	2010/07	Android 2.0 Eclair	
Motorola Milestone XT720	Motorola	2010/07	Android 2.1 Eclair	
Motorola Charm	Motorola	2010/08	Android 2.0 Eclair	
Motorola Droid 2	Motorola	2010/08	Android 2.2 Froyo	
Motorola Defy	Motorola	2010/10	Android 2.0 Eclair	
Motorola Bravo	Motorola	2010/11	Android 2.1 Eclair	
Motorola Droid Pro	Motorola	2010/11	Android 2.2 Froyo	
Motorola Flipside	Motorola	2010/11	Android 2.2 Froyo	
Motorola Atrix 4G	Motorola Mobility	2011/02	Android 2.3 Gingerbread	
Motorola Droid 3	Motorola Mobility	2011/07	Android 2.3 Gingerbread	
Motorola Droid Bionic	Motorola Mobility	2011/09	Android 2.3 Gingerbread	
Motorola Atrix 2	Motorola Mobility	2011/10	Android 2.3 Gingerbread	
Motorola Droid Razr	Motorola Mobility	2011/11	Android 2.3 Gingerbread	
Motorola Droid 4	Motorola Mobility	2012/02	Android 2.3 Gingerbread	
Motorola Atrix HD	Motorola Mobility	2012/07	Android 4.0 Ice Cream Sandwich	
Motorola Photon Q	Motorola Mobility	2012/08	Android 4.0 Ice Cream Sandwich	
Motorola Droid Razr M	Motorola Mobility	2012/09	Android 4.0 Ice Cream Sandwich	
Motorola Droid Razr HD	Motorola Mobility	2012/10	Android 4.0 Ice Cream Sandwich	
Motorola Droid Maxx	Motorola Mobility	2013/08	Android 4.1 Jelly Bean	
Motorola Droid Mini	Motorola Mobility	2013/08	Android 4.1 Jelly Bean	
Moto X (1st generation)	Motorola Mobility	2013/08	Android 4.1 Jelly Bean	
Moto G (1st generation)	Motorola Mobility	2013/11	Android 4.1 Jelly Bean	
Moto E (1st generation)	Motorola Mobility	2014/05	Android 4.4 KitKat	
Moto G (2nd generation)	Motorola Mobility	2014/09	Android 4.4 KitKat	
Moto X (2nd generation)	Motorola Mobility	2014/09	Android 4.4 KitKat	
Motorola Droid Turbo	Motorola Mobility	2014/10	Android 4.4 KitKat	
Moto E (2nd generation)	Motorola Mobility	2015/02	Android 5.0 Lollipop	
Moto G (3rd generation)	Motorola Mobility	2015/07	Android 5.0 Lollipop	
Moto X Play	Motorola Mobility	2015/07	Android 5.0 Lollipop	
Moto X Style	Motorola Mobility	2015/09	Android 5.1.1 Lollipop	
Moto G4	Motorola Mobility	2016/05	Android 6.0 Marshmallow	
Moto E3	Motorola Mobility	2016/07	Android 6.0 Marshmallow	
Moto Z	Motorola Mobility	2016/09	Android 6.0 Marshmallow	
Moto Z Play	Motorola Mobility	2016/09	Android 6.0 Marshmallow	
Moto G5	Motorola Mobility	2017/03	Android 7.0 Nougat	
Moto C	Motorola Mobility	2017/05	Android 7.0 Nougat	
Moto E4	Motorola Mobility	2017/06	Android 7.0 Nougat	
Moto Z2 Play	Motorola Mobility	2017/06	Android 7.0 Nougat	
Moto Z2 Force	Motorola Mobility	2017/08	Android 7.0 Nougat	
Moto X4	Motorola Mobility	2017/09	Android 7.0 Nougat	
Moto E5	Motorola Mobility	2018/05	Android 8.0 Oreo	
Moto G6	Motorola Mobility	2018/05	Android 8.0 Oreo	
Moto Z3 Play	Motorola Mobility	2018/06	Android 8.0 Oreo	
Moto Z3	Motorola Mobility	2018/08	Android 8.0 Oreo	
Motorola One/One Power	Motorola Mobility	2018/10	Android 8.0 Oreo	
Moto G7	Motorola Mobility	2019/03	Android 9 Pie	
Motorola One Vision	Motorola Mobility	2019/06	Android 9 Pie	
Moto Z4	Motorola Mobility	2019/06	Android 9 Pie	
Motorola One Zoom	Motorola Mobility	2019/09	Android 9 Pie	
Moto G8 Plus	Motorola Mobility	2019/10	Android 9 Pie	
Motorola One Macro	Motorola Mobility	2019/10	Android 9 Pie	
Motorola One Action	Motorola Mobility	2019/10	Android 9 Pie	
Motorola Razr (4G)	Motorola Mobility	2019/11	Android 9 Pie	
Motorola One Hyper	Motorola Mobility	2020/01	Android 10	
Moto G8 Power	Motorola Mobility	2020/02	Android 10	
Moto G Power/Stylus	Motorola Mobility	2020/02	Android 10	
Moto G8	Motorola Mobility	2020/03	Android 10	
Moto E6s (2020)	Motorola Mobility	2020/03	Android 9 Pie	
Moto G8 Power Lite	Motorola Mobility	2020/04	Android 9 Pie	
Motorola Edge/Edge+	Motorola Mobility	2020/05	Android 10	
Moto G Pro	Motorola Mobility	2020/05	Android 10	
Moto E (2020)	Motorola Mobility	2020/06	Android 10	
Moto G Fast	Motorola Mobility	2020/06	Android 10	
Motorola One Fusion+	Motorola Mobility	2020/06	Android 10	
Motorola One Fusion	Motorola Mobility	2020/07	Android 10	
Motorola Razr 2024	Motorola Mobility	2024/07	Android 14	
Motorola Razr 2025	Motorola Mobility	2025/05	Android 15	
Motorola edge 2024	Motorola Mobility	2024/06	Android 14	
Motorola edge 2025	Motorola Mobility	2025/06	Android 15	
Motorola edge 5G UW (2021)	Motorola Mobility	2021/10	Android 13	
Moto G 5G Plus	Motorola Mobility	2020/07	Android 10	
Moto G9 Play	Motorola Mobility	2020/08	Android 10	
Moto G9 Plus	Motorola Mobility	2020/09	Android 10	
Moto E7 Plus	Motorola Mobility	2020/09	Android 10	
Motorola Razr (5G)	Motorola Mobility	2020/09	Android 10	
Moto G9 Power	Motorola Mobility	2020/12	Android 10	
Moto G 5G	Motorola Mobility	2020/12	Android 10	
Moto E7	Motorola Mobility	2020/12	Android 10	
Moto G Play (2021)	Motorola Mobility	2021/01	Android 10	
Moto G Power (2021)	Motorola Mobility	2021/01	Android 10	
Moto G Stylus (2021)	Motorola Mobility	2021/01	Android 10	
Moto E6i	Motorola Mobility	2021/02	Android 10	
Moto E7 Power	Motorola Mobility	2021/02	Android 10	
Moto G10	Motorola Mobility	2021/03	Android 11	
Moto G30	Motorola Mobility	2021/03	Android 11	
Moto G10 Power	Motorola Mobility	2021/03	Android 11	
Moto G50	Motorola Mobility	2021/04	Android 11	
Moto G100	Motorola Mobility	2021/04	Android 11	
Moto G60	Motorola Mobility	2021/04	Android 11	
Moto G40 Fusion	Motorola Mobility	2021/05	Android 11	
Moto G20	Motorola Mobility	2021/06	Android 11	
Moto G Stylus 5G	Motorola Mobility	2021/06	Android 11	
Motorola Defy (2021)	Motorola Mobility	2021/07	Android 10	
Moto G50 5G	Motorola Mobility	2021/08	Android 11	
Moto G60S	Motorola Mobility	2021/08	Android 11	
Motorola Edge 20	Motorola Mobility	2021/08	Android 11	
Motorola Edge (2021)	Motorola Mobility	2021/09	Android 11	
MyPhone myA1 Plus	MyPhone	2020/09	Android 9 Pie (Go Edition)	
MyPhone Agua Rain 2G	MyPhone	2013/10	Android 4.2.2 (Jelly Bean)	
MyPhone Agua Cyclone	MyPhone	2013/12	Android 4.2.2 (Jelly Bean)	
MyPhone Iceberg Mini	MyPhone	2013/11	Android 4.2.2 (Jelly Bean)	
MyPhone myA17	MyPhone	2020/09	Android 9 Pie (Go Edition)	
MyPhone myA18	MyPhone	N/A	Android 9 Pie (Go Edition)	
MyPhone myP1	MyPhone	2020/08	Android 9 Pie	
MyPhone myG1	MyPhone	N/A	Android 9 Pie (Go Edition)	
MyPhone myXl1	MyPhone	N/A	Android 8.1 Oreo (Go Edition)	
MyPhone myXl1 Pro	MyPhone	N/A	Android 9 Pie	
MyPhone myXl1 Plus	MyPhone	N/A	Android 9 Pie	
MyPhone myX12	MyPhone	N/A	Android 9 Pie	
MyPhone myXl3	MyPhone	N/A	Android 9 Pie	
MyPhone Rio Craze	MyPhone	2014/07	Android 4.4 (KitKat)	
MyPhone Rio Fun	MyPhone	2014/05	Android 4.2.2 (Jelly Bean)	

== N ==
Model	Developer	Release date	Android version at release	Ref.
Nextbit Robin	Nextbit	2016/02	Android 5.0 Lollipop	
Nexus One	HTC/Google	2010/01	Android 2.0 Eclair	
Nexus S	Samsung Electronics/Google	2010/12	Android 2.3 Gingerbread	
Galaxy Nexus	Samsung Electronics/Google	2011/11	Android 4.0 Ice Cream Sandwich	
Nexus 4	LG Electronics/Google	2012/11	Android 4.1 Jelly Bean	
Nexus 5	LG Electronics/Google	2013/10	Android 4.4 KitKat	
Nexus 6	Motorola Mobility/Google	2014/11	Android 5.0 Lollipop	
Nexus 5X	LG Electronics/Google	2015/09	Android 6.0 Marshmallow	
Nexus 6P	Huawei/Google	2015/09	Android 6.0 Marshmallow	
Nokia X	Nokia	2014/02	Android 4.1 Jelly Bean	
Nokia XL	Microsoft Mobile	2014/05	Android 4.1 Jelly Bean	
Nokia X2	Microsoft Mobile	2014/06	Android 4.1 Jelly Bean	
Nokia 6	HMD Global	2017/01	Android 7.1 Nougat	
Nokia 3	HMD Global	2017/06	Android 7.0 Nougat	
Nokia 5	HMD Global	2017/07	Android 7.1 Nougat	
Nokia 7	HMD Global	2017/10	Android 7.1 Nougat	
Nokia 8	HMD Global	2017/10	Android 7.1 Nougat	
Nokia 2	HMD Global	2017/11	Android 7.1 Nougat	
Nokia 7 Plus	HMD Global	2018/03	Android 8.1 Oreo	
Nokia 1	HMD Global	2018/04	Android 8.1 Oreo	
Nokia 6.1	HMD Global	2018/04	Android 8.1 Oreo	
Nokia 8 Sirocco	HMD Global	2018/04	Android 8.0 Oreo	
Nokia 3.1	HMD Global	2018/05	Android 8.0 Oreo	
Nokia 5.1 Plus	HMD Global	2018/07	Android 8.1 Oreo	
Nokia 2.1	HMD Global	2018/08	Android 8.1 Oreo	
Nokia 5.1	HMD Global	2018/08	Android 8.0 Oreo	
Nokia 6.1 Plus	HMD Global	2018/08	Android 8.1 Oreo	
Nokia 3.1 Plus	HMD Global	2018/10	Android 8.1 Oreo	
Nokia 7.1	HMD Global	2018/10	Android 8.1 Oreo	
Nokia 8.1	HMD Global	2018/12	Android 9 Pie	
Nokia 9 PureView	HMD Global	2019/02	Android 9 Pie	
Nokia 1 Plus	HMD Global	2019/03	Android 9 Pie	
Nokia 4.2	HMD Global	2019/04	Android 9 Pie	
Nokia 3.2	HMD Global	2019/05	Android 9 Pie	
Nokia 2.2	HMD Global	2019/06	Android 9 Pie	
Nokia 6.2	HMD Global	2019/09	Android 9 Pie	
Nokia 7.2	HMD Global	2019/09	Android 9 Pie	
Nokia 2.3	HMD Global	2019/12	Android 9 Pie	
Nokia C1	HMD Global	2019/12	Android 9 Pie	
Nokia C2	HMD Global	2020/03	Android 9 Pie	
Nokia 1.3	HMD Global	2020/04	Android 10	
Nokia 5.3	HMD Global	2020/04	Android 10	
Nokia C2 Tava	HMD Global	2020/05	Android 10	
Nokia C5 Endi	HMD Global	2020/06	Android 10	
Nokia C2 Tennen	HMD Global	2020/06	Android 10	
Nokia C3	HMD Global	2020/08	Android 10	
Nokia 2.4	HMD Global	2020/09	Android 10	
Nokia 3.4	HMD Global	2020/10	Android 10	
Nokia C1 Plus	HMD Global	2020/12	Android 10	
Nokia 5.4	HMD Global	2021/01	Android 10	
Nokia 1.4	HMD Global	2021/02	Android 10	
Nokia C20	HMD Global	2021/04	Android 11	
Nokia G10	HMD Global	2021/04	Android 11	
Nokia G20	HMD Global	2021/05	Android 11	
Nokia X20	HMD Global	2021/05	Android 11	
Nokia C10	HMD Global	2021/06	Android 11	
Nokia X10	HMD Global	2021/06	Android 11	
Nokia C01 Plus	HMD Global	2021/06	Android 11	
Nokia C20 Plus	HMD Global	2021/06	Android 11	
Nokia C30	HMD Global	2021/08	Android 11	
Nokia XR20	HMD Global	2021/08	Android 11	
Nokia G50	HMD Global	2021/10	Android 11	
Nokia G300	HMD Global	2021/10	Android 11	
Nokia X100	HMD Global	2021/11	Android 11	
Nokia G21	HMD Global	2022/02	Android 11	
Nokia G11	HMD Global	2022/03	Android 11	
Nokia C2 2nd Edition	HMD Global	2022/04	Android 11	
Nokia C21 Plus	HMD Global	2022/04	Android 11	
Nokia C21	HMD Global	2022/05	Android 11	
Nokia C100/C200	HMD Global	Q2 2022	Android 12	
Nokia G11 Plus	HMD Global	2022/07	Android 12	
Nokia G400	HMD Global	2022/08	Android 12	
Nokia C31	HMD Global	2022/09	Android 12	
Nokia X30	HMD Global	2022/09	Android 12	
Nokia C12	HMD Global	2023/02	Android 12	
Nokia G22	HMD Global	2023/02	Android 12	
Nokia C22/C32	HMD Global	2023/02	Android 13	
Nokia C12 Pro	HMD Global	2023/03	Android 12	
Nokia C02	HMD Global	2023/05	Android 12	
Nokia C12 Plus	HMD Global	2023/05	Android 12	
Nokia XR21	HMD Global	2023/06	Android 12	
Nokia C110/C300	HMD Global	2023/06	Android 12	
Nokia G42	HMD Global	2023/06	Android 13	
Nokia G310	HMD Global	2023/08	Android 13	
Nokia C210	HMD Global	2023/09	Android 13	
Nothing Phone 1	Nothing	2022/07	Android 12	
Nothing Phone 2	Nothing	2023/07	Android 13	
Nothing Phone 2a	Nothing	2024/03	Android 14	
Nothing Phone 2a Plus	Nothing	2024/08	Android 14	
Nothing Phone 3a/Pro	Nothing	2025/03	Android 16	
Nubia Z5	ZTE	2012/12	Android 4.1 Jelly Bean	
Nubia Z5S	ZTE	2013/12	Android 4.1 Jelly Bean	
Nubia Z5S mini NX403A	ZTE	2013/12	Android 4.1 Jelly Bean	
Nubia X6	ZTE	2014/03	Android 4.1 Jelly Bean	
Nubia Z7/Max/mini	ZTE	2014/07	Android 4.4 KitKat	
Nubia Z5S mini NX405H	ZTE	2014/08	Android 4.1 Jelly Bean	
Nubia Z9 Max	ZTE	2015/04	Android 5.0 Lollipop	
Nubia Z9 mini	ZTE	2015/04	Android 5.0 Lollipop	
Nubia Z9	ZTE	2015/05	Android 5.0 Lollipop	
Nubia My Prague	ZTE	2015/06	Android 5.0 Lollipop	
Nubia Prague S	ZTE	2016/01	Android 5.0 Lollipop	
Nubia Z11 mini	ZTE	2016/04	Android 5.0 Lollipop	
Nubia Z11 Max	ZTE	2016/06	Android 5.0 Lollipop	
Nubia Z11	ZTE	2016/06	Android 6.0 Marshmallow	
Nubia N1	ZTE	2016/07	Android 6.0 Marshmallow	
Nubia Z11 mini S	ZTE	2016/10	Android 6.0 Marshmallow	
Nubia M2/lite	ZTE	2017/03	Android 6.0 Marshmallow	
Nubia N2	ZTE	2017/03	Android 6.0 Marshmallow	
Nubia N1 lite	ZTE	2017/04	Android 6.0 Marshmallow	
Nubia Z17 mini	ZTE	2017/04	Android 6.0 Marshmallow	
Nubia Z17	ZTE	2017/06	Android 7.0 Nougat	
Nubia Z17 lite	ZTE	2017/08	Android 7.0 Nougat	
Nubia Z17 miniS	ZTE	2017/10	Android 7.0 Nougat	
Nubia Z17s	ZTE	2017/10	Android 7.0 Nougat	
Nubia N3	ZTE	2018/03	Android 7.0 Nougat	
Nubia V18	ZTE	2018/03	Android 7.0 Nougat	
Nubia Z18 mini	ZTE	2018/04	Android 8.0 Oreo	
Nubia Red Magic	ZTE	2018/04	Android 8.0 Oreo	
Nubia Z18	ZTE	2018/09	Android 8.0 Oreo	
Nubia X	ZTE	2018/11	Android 8.0 Oreo	
Nubia Red Magic Mars	ZTE	2018/12	Android 9 Pie	
Nubia Red Magic 3	ZTE	2019/05	Android 9 Pie	
Nubia Z20	ZTE	2019/08	Android 9 Pie	
Nubia Red Magic 3s	ZTE	2019/09	Android 9 Pie	
Nubia Red Magic 5G	ZTE	2020/03	Android 10	
Nubia Play	ZTE	2020/06	Android 10	
Nubia Red Magic 5G Lite	ZTE	2020/06	Android 10	
Nubia Red Magic 5S	ZTE	2020/08	Android 10	
Nubia Red Magic 6/Pro	ZTE	2021/03	Android 11	
Nubia Z30 Pro	ZTE	2021/05	Android 11	
Nubia Red Magic 6R	ZTE	2021/06	Android 11	
Nubia Red Magic 6s/Pro	ZTE	2021/03	Android 11	
Nubia Red Magic 7/Pro	ZTE	2022/02	Android 12	
Nubia Z40 Pro	ZTE	2022/03	Android 12	
Nubia Red Magic 7S/Pro	ZTE	2022/07	Android 12	
Nubia Z40S Pro	ZTE	2022/07	Android 12	
Nubia Z50	ZTE	2022/12	Android 13	
Nubia Red Magic 8 Pro/Pro+	ZTE	2022/12	Android 13	
Nubia Z50 Ultra	ZTE	2023/03	Android 13	
Nubia Red Magic 8s Pro/Pro+	ZTE	2023/07	Android 13	
Nubia Red Magic 8s Pro/Pro+	ZTE	2023/07	Android 13	
Nubia Z50S Pro	ZTE	2023/07	Android 13	
Nubia Neo	ZTE	2023/07	Android 13	
Nubia Red Magic 9 Pro/Pro+	ZTE	2023/11	Android 14	
Nubia Z60 Ultra	ZTE	2023/12	Android 14	
Nubia Flip	ZTE	2024/04	Android 14	
Nubia Music	ZTE	2024/05	Android 14	
Nubia Neo 2	ZTE	Q2 2024	Android 14	
Nubia Focus/Pro	ZTE	Q2 2024	Android 13	
Nubia Z60 Ultra Leading Version/Z60S Pro	ZTE	2024/08	Android 14	
Nubia Red Magic 10 Pro/Pro+	ZTE	2024/11	Android 15	
Nubia Z70 Ultra	ZTE	2024/11	Android 15	
Nubia Music 2	ZTE	2025/01	Android 14	
Nubia Red Magic 10 Air	ZTE	2025/04	Android 15	
Nubia Red Magic 10S Pro/Pro+	ZTE	2024/11	Android 15	
Nubia Neo 3/GT	ZTE	2025/06	Android 15	
Nubia Focus 2/Ultra	ZTE	2025/06	Android 15	

== O ==
Model	Developer	Release date	Android version at release	Ref.				
OnePlus One	OnePlus	2014/04	Android 4.4 KitKat					
OnePlus 2	OnePlus	2015/07	Android 5.0 Lollipop					
OnePlus X	OnePlus	2015/10	Android 5.0 Lollipop					
OnePlus 3	OnePlus	2016/06	Android 6.0 Marshmallow					
OnePlus 3T	OnePlus	2016/11	Android 6.0 Marshmallow					
OnePlus 5	OnePlus	2017/06	Android 7.0 Nougat					
OnePlus 5T	OnePlus	2017/11	Android 7.0 Nougat					
OnePlus 6	OnePlus	2018/04	Android 8.0 Oreo					
OnePlus 6T	OnePlus	2018/11	Android 9 Pie					
OnePlus 7/Pro	OnePlus	2019/05	Android 9 Pie					
OnePlus 7T/Pro	OnePlus	2019/10	Android 10					
OnePlus 8/Pro	OnePlus	2020/04	Android 10					
OnePlus Nord	OnePlus	2020/08	Android 10					
OnePlus 8T	OnePlus	2020/10	Android 11					
OnePlus Nord N10 5G	OnePlus	2020/11	Android 10					
OnePlus Nord N100	OnePlus	2020/11	Android 10					
OnePlus 9/Pro	OnePlus	2021/03	Android 11					
OnePlus Nord CE 5G	OnePlus	2021/06	Android 11					
OnePlus Nord N200 5G	OnePlus	2021/06	Android 11					
OnePlus Nord 2 5G	OnePlus	2021/07	Android 11					
OnePlus 10 Pro	OnePlus	2022/01	Android 12					
Oppo Finder	Oppo	2012/06	Android 4.0 Ice Cream Sandwich					
Oppo Find 5	Oppo	2012/12	Android 4.1 Jelly Bean					
Oppo N1	Oppo	2013/12	Android 4.1 Jelly Bean					
Oppo Find 5 Mini	Oppo	2014/01	Android 4.1 Jelly Bean					
Oppo Neo	Oppo	2014/02	Android 4.1 Jelly Bean					
Oppo Find 7/7a	Oppo	2014/03	Android 4.1 Jelly Bean					
Oppo Joy	Oppo	2014/02	Android 4.1 Jelly Bean					
Oppo N1 mini	Oppo	2014/08	Android 4.1 Jelly Bean					
Oppo Neo 3/5	Oppo	2014/08	Android 4.1 Jelly Bean					
Oppo N3	Oppo	2014/10	Android 4.4 KitKat					
Oppo Joy Plus	Oppo	2015/08	Android 4.4 KitKat					
Oppo Neo 5s	Oppo	2015/05	Android 4.4 KitKat					
Oppo R7	Oppo	2015/05	Android 4.4 KitKat					
Oppo Neo 5 (2015)	Oppo	2015/08	Android 4.4 KitKat					
Oppo Joy 3	Oppo	2015/08	Android 4.4 KitKat					
Oppo Neo 7	Oppo	2015/10	Android 5.0 Lollipop					
Oppo F1	Oppo	2016/01	Android 5.0 Lollipop					
Oppo R11	Oppo	2017/06	Android 7.0 Nougat					
Oppo F7	Oppo	2018/04	Android 8.0 Oreo					
Oppo R15 Pro	Oppo	2018/04	Android 8.0 Oreo					
Oppo Find X	Oppo	2018/07	Android 8.0 Oreo					
Oppo F9	Oppo	2018/08	Android 8.0 Oreo					
Oppo R17	Oppo	2018/09	Android 8.0 Oreo					
Oppo Reno	Oppo	2019/04	Android 9 Pie					
Oppo Reno2	Oppo	2019/09	Android 9 Pie					
Oppo A9 (2020)	Oppo	2019/09	Android 9 Pie					
Oppo Reno3 5G/Pro 5G	Oppo	2019/12	Android 10					
Oppo Reno3 Pro	Oppo	2020/03	Android 10					
Oppo Find X2/Pro	Oppo	2020/03	Android 10					
Oppo Reno3	Oppo	2020/03	Android 10					
Oppo Ace2	Oppo	2020/04	Android 10					
Oppo A12	Oppo	2020/04	Android 9 Pie					
Oppo A52	Oppo	2020/04	Android 10					
Oppo A72/A92s	Oppo	2020/04	Android 10					
Oppo Find X2 Lite/Neo	Oppo	2020/05	Android 10					
Oppo A92	Oppo	2020/05	Android 10					
Oppo Reno4 5G/Pro 5G	Oppo	2020/06	Android 10					
Oppo A12s	Oppo	2020/07	Android 9 Pie					
Oppo A72 5G	Oppo	2020/07	Android 10					
Oppo Reno4/Pro	Oppo	2020/08	Android 10					
Oppo F17/Pro	Oppo	2020/09	Android 10					
Oppo Reno4 SE	Oppo	2020/09	Android 10					
Oppo Reno4 Lite	Oppo	2020/09	Android 10					
Oppo Reno4 Z 5G	Oppo	2020/10	Android 10					
Oppo A93/Reno4 F	Oppo	2020/10	Android 10					
Oppo A73	Oppo	2020/11	Android 10					
Oppo A73 5G	Oppo	2020/11	Android 10					
Oppo Reno5 5G/Pro 5G/Pro+ 5G	Oppo	2021/01	Android 11					
Oppo Reno5	Oppo	2021/01	Android 11					
Oppo Find X3/Pro	Oppo	2021/03	Android 11					
Oppo Find X3 Neo/Lite	Oppo	2021/03	Android 11					
Oppo A94	Oppo	2021/03	Android 11					
Oppo F19 Pro/Pro+	Oppo	2021/03	Android 11					
Oppo Reno5 Lite/F	Oppo	2021/03	Android 11					
Oppo Reno5 Z	Oppo	2021/04	Android 11					
Oppo F19	Oppo	2021/04	Android 11					
Oppo A35	Oppo	2021/04	Android 10					
Oppo A94 5G	Oppo	2021/05	Android 11					
Oppo A95 5G	Oppo	2021/05	Android 11					
Oppo A54 5G/A74 5G	Oppo	2021/04	Android 11					
Oppo A74	Oppo	2021/05	Android 11					
Oppo A53s 5G	Oppo	2021/05	Android 11					
Oppo K9	Oppo	2021/05	Android 11					
Oppo Reno6 5G/Pro/Pro+	Oppo	2021/06	Android 11					
Oppo A16	Oppo	2021/07	Android 11					
Oppo Reno6	Oppo	2021/08	Android 11					
Oppo A16s	Oppo	2021/08	Android 11					
Oppo Reno6 Z	Oppo	2021/08	Android 11					
Oppo Reno6 Pro (Snapdragon)	Oppo	2021/09	Android 11					
Oppo K9 Pro	Oppo	2021/09	Android 11					
Oppo F19s	Oppo	2021/09	Android 11					
Oppo A55	Oppo	2021/10	Android 11					
Oppo K9s	Oppo	2021/10	Android 11					
Oppo A56 5G	Oppo	2021/11	Android 11					
Oppo A54s	Oppo	2021/11	Android 11					
Oppo A16k	Oppo	2021/11	Android 11					
Oppo A95	Oppo	2021/11	Android 11					
Oppo Reno7 (China)/Pro/SE	Oppo	2021/12	Android 11					
Oppo Find N	Oppo	2021/12	Android 11					
Oppo K9x	Oppo	2021/12	Android 11					
Oppo A11s	Oppo	2021/12	Android 11					
Oppo A36	Oppo	2022/01	Android 11					
Oppo A96 5G	Oppo	2022/01	Android 11					
Oppo Reno6 Lite	Oppo	2022/01	Android 11					
Oppo Reno7	Oppo	2022/02	Android 11					
Oppo A76	Oppo	2022/02	Android 11					
Oppo Find X5/Pro	Oppo	2022/03	Android 12					
Oppo Find X5 Lite	Oppo	2022/03	Android 11					
Oppo Reno7 Z	Oppo	2022/03	Android 11					
Oppo A16e	Oppo	2022/03	Android 11					
Oppo A96	Oppo	2022/03	Android 11					
Oppo K10	Oppo	2022/03	Android 11					
Oppo K12x	Oppo	2024/07	Android 14					
Oppo Find N6	Oppo	2026/03	Android 16		Oppo Find X10/E/Pro Max	Oppo	2026/09	Android 17

== P ==
Model	Developer	Release date	Android version at release	Ref.
Palm	Palm, Inc.	2018/10	Android 8.0 Oreo	
Panasonic P100	Panasonic	2018/02	Android 7.0 Nougat	
Pantech Pocket	Pantech or AT&T	2011/12	Android 2.3 Gingerbread	
Pepsi P1/P1S	Pepsi	2015/11	Android 5.1 Lollipop	
Pixel/XL	Google	2016/10	Android 7.1 Nougat	
Pixel 2/XL	Google	2017/10	Android 8.0 Oreo	
Pixel 3/XL	Google	2018/10	Android 9 Pie	
Pixel 3a/XL	Google	2019/03	Android 9 Pie	
Pixel 4/XL	Google	2019/10	Android 10	
Pixel 4a	Google	2020/08	Android 10	
Pixel 4a (5G)	Google	2020/11	Android 11	
Pixel 5	Google	2020/10	Android 11	
Pixel 5a	Google	2021/08	Android 11	
Pixel 6/Pro	Google	2021/10	Android 12	
Pixel 6a	Google	2022/07	Android 12	
Pixel 7/Pro	Google	2022/10	Android 13	
Pixel 7a	Google	2023/05	Android 13	
Pixel Fold	Google	2023/06	Android 13	
Pixel 8/Pro	Google	2023/10	Android 14	
Pixel 8a	Google	2024/05	Android 14	
Pixel 9/Pro/Pro XL	Google	2024/08	Android 15	
Pixel 9a	Google	2025/04	Android 15	
Pixel 9 Pro Fold	Google	2024/09	Android 14	
Pixel 10	Google	2025/08	Android 16	
Pixel 10 Pro	Google	2025/08	Android 16	
Pixel 10 Pro XL	Google	2025/08	Android 16	
Pixel 10 Pro Fold	Google	2025/10	Android 16	
Xiaomi Pocophone F1	Xiaomi	2018/08	Android 8.1 Oreo	
POCO X2	Xiaomi	2020/02	Android 10	
POCO F2 Pro	Xiaomi	2020/05	Android 10	
POCO M2 Pro	Xiaomi	2020/07	Android 10	
POCO X3 NFC	Xiaomi	2020/09	Android 10	
POCO M2	Xiaomi	2020/09	Android 10	
POCO X3	Xiaomi	2020/09	Android 10	
POCO C3	Xiaomi	2020/10	Android 10	
POCO M3	Xiaomi	2020/11	Android 10	
POCO X3 Pro	Xiaomi	2021/03	Android 11	
POCO F3	Xiaomi	2021/03	Android 11	
POCO M2 Reloaded	Xiaomi	2021/04	Android 10	
POCO M3 Pro	Xiaomi	2021/05	Android 11	
POCO F3 GT	Xiaomi	2021/07	Android 11	
POCO X3 GT	Xiaomi	2021/08	Android 11	
POCO C31	Xiaomi	2021/10	Android 10	
POCO M4 Pro 5G	Xiaomi	2021/12	Android 11	
POCO M4 Pro	Xiaomi	2022/02	Android 11	
POCO X4 Pro 5G	Xiaomi	2022/02	Android 11	
POCO F4 GT	Xiaomi	2022/04	Android 12	
POCO M4 5G	Xiaomi	2021/09	Android 12	
POCO C40	Xiaomi	2022/06	Android 11	
POCO X4 GT	Xiaomi	2022/06	Android 12	
POCO F4	Xiaomi	2022/06	Android 12	
POCO M5/M5s	Xiaomi	2022/09	Android 12	
POCO C50	Xiaomi	2023/01	Android 12	
POCO X5/Pro	Xiaomi	2023/02	Android 12	
POCO C55	Xiaomi	2023/02	Android 12	
POCO C51	Xiaomi	2023/04	Android 13	
POCO F5/Pro	Xiaomi	2023/05	Android 13	
POCO M6 Pro 5G	Xiaomi	2023/08	Android 13	
POCO C65	Xiaomi	2023/11	Android 13	
POCO M6 5G	Xiaomi	2023/12	Android 13	
POCO M6 Pro/X6	Xiaomi	2024/01	Android 13	
POCO X6 Pro	Xiaomi	2024/01	Android 14	
POCO X6 Neo	Xiaomi	2024/03	Android 13	
POCO C61	Xiaomi	2024/03	Android 14	
POCO F6/Pro	Xiaomi	2024/05	Android 14	
POCO M6	Xiaomi	2024/06	Android 14	

== Q ==
Model	Developer	Release date	Android version at release	Ref.
QMobile Noir Z5	QMobile	2014/07	Android 4.2 Jelly Bean (w/ Amigo 2 skin)	
QMobile Noir Z6	QMobile	2014/07	Android 4.4.2 Jelly Bean (w/ Amigo 2 skin)	
QMobile Noir Z7	QMobile	2015/02	Android 4.4.2 KitKat (w/ Amigo 2 skin)	
QMobile Noir Z14	QMobile	2016/09	Android 6.0.1 Marshmallow (w/ Amigo 3.2 skin)	
QMobile Noir A1	QMobile	2017/07	Android 7.0 Nougat (w/ Amigo 4 skin)	

== R ==
Model	Developer	Release date	Android version at release	Ref.
Razer Phone	Razer Inc.	2017/11	Android 7.1 Nougat	
Razer Phone 2	Razer Inc.	2018/10	Android 8.1 Oreo	
Realme 1	Realme	2018/05	Android 8.1 Oreo	
Realme 2	Realme	2018/09	Android 8.1 Oreo	
Realme C1	Realme	2018/10	Android 8.1 Oreo	
Realme 2 Pro	Realme	2018/10	Android 8.1 Oreo	
Realme U1	Realme	2018/12	Android 8.1 Oreo	
Realme 3	Realme	2019/03	Android 9 Pie	
Realme C2	Realme	2019/05	Android 9 Pie	
Realme 3 Pro	Realme	2019/05	Android 9 Pie	
Realme X	Realme	2019/07	Android 9 Pie	
Realme 3i	Realme	2019/07	Android 9 Pie	
Realme 5	Realme	2019/08	Android 9 Pie	
Realme 5 Pro	Realme	2019/09	Android 9 Pie	
Realme XT	Realme	2019/09	Android 9 Pie	
Realme X2	Realme	2019/09	Android 9 Pie	
Realme X2 Pro	Realme	2019/10	Android 9 Pie	
Realme 5i	Realme	2020/01	Android 9 Pie	
Realme X50	Realme	2020/01	Android 10	
Realme C3	Realme	2020/02	Android 10	
Realme X50 Pro	Realme	2020/03	Android 10	
Realme 6/Pro	Realme	2020/03	Android 10	
Realme 6i	Realme	2020/03	Android 10	
Realme X50 Pro Player	Realme	2020/06	Android 10	
Realme X3 SuperZoom	Realme	2020/06	Android 10	
Realme Narzo	Realme	2020/06	Android 10	
Realme C3i	Realme	2020/06	Android 10	
Realme X3	Realme	2020/06	Android 10	
Realme C11	Realme	2020/06	Android 10	
Realme C15	Realme	2020/07	Android 10	
Realme V5	Realme	2020/08	Android 10	
Realme C12	Realme	2020/08	Android 10	
Realme V3	Realme	2020/09	Android 10	
Realme X7/Pro	Realme	2020/09	Android 10	
Realme 7 (Asia)/Pro	Realme	2020/09	Android 10	
Realme 7i	Realme	2020/09	Android 10	
Realme C17	Realme	2020/09	Android 10	
Realme Narzo 20/Pro/20A	Realme	2020/09	Android 10	
Realme 7 (Global)	Realme	2020/10	Android 10	
Realme Q2/Pro/2i	Realme	2020/10	Android 10	
Realme 7 5G	Realme	2020/11	Android 10	
Realme 7i (Global)	Realme	2020/12	Android 10	
Realme V15	Realme	2021/01	Android 10	
Realme C20	Realme	2021/01	Android 10	
Realme X7 (India)	Realme	2021/02	Android 10	
Realme V11	Realme	2021/02	Android 11	
Realme Narzo 30 Pro/30A	Realme	2020/03	Android 10	
Realme C21	Realme	2021/03	Android 10	
Realme GT	Realme	2021/03	Android 11	
Realme C25	Realme	2021/03	Android 11	
Realme 8/Pro	Realme	2021/03	Android 11	
Realme V13	Realme	2021/04	Android 11	
Realme GT Neo	Realme	2021/04	Android 11	
Realme X7 Pro Ultra	Realme	2021/04	Android 11	
Realme 8 5G	Realme	2021/04	Android 11	
Realme Q3/Pro/3i	Realme	2021/04	Android 11	
Realme C20A	Realme	2021/05	Android 10	
Realme narzo 30	Realme	2021/05	Android 11	
Realme GT Neo Flash	Realme	2021/06	Android 11	
Realme Q3 Pro Carnival	Realme	2021/06	Android 11	
Realme narzo 30 5G	Realme	2021/06	Android 11	
Realme X7 Max	Realme	2021/06	Android 11	
Realme C25s	Realme	2021/06	Android 11	
Realme C11 2021	Realme	2021/06	Android 11	
Realme C21Y	Realme	2021/07	Android 11	
Realme GT Master Edition	Realme	2021/07	Android 11	
Realme GT Explorer Master Edition	Realme	2021/07	Android 11	
Realme 8i/8s 5G	Realme	2021/09	Android 11	
Realme C25Y	Realme	2021/09	Android 11	
Realme GT Neo2	Realme	2021/09	Android 11	
Realme V11s	Realme	2021/10	Android 11	
Realme narzo 50A/50i	Realme	2021/10	Android 11	
Realme Q3s	Realme	2021/11	Android 11	
Realme GT Neo2T	Realme	2021/11	Android 11	
Realme Q3t	Realme	2021/11	Android 11	
Realme GT2/Pro	Realme	2022/01	Android 12	
Realme 9i	Realme	2022/01	Android 11	
Realme C35	Realme	2022/02	Android 11	
Realme 9 Pro/Pro+	Realme	2022/02	Android 12	
Realme narzo 50	Realme	2022/02	Android 11	
Realme V25	Realme	2022/03	Android 12	
Realme 9 5G (India)/5G Speed Edition	Realme	2022/03	Android 11	
Realme narzo 50A Prime	Realme	2022/03	Android 11	
Realme GT Neo3/150W	Realme	2022/03	Android 12	
Realme 9	Realme	2022/04	Android 12	
Realme Q5i	Realme	2022/04	Android 12	
Realme Q5/Pro	Realme	2022/04	Android 12	
Realme V23	Realme	2022/04	Android 12	
Realme narzo 50 5G/Pro	Realme	2022/05	Android 12	
Realme 9 5G	Realme	2022/06	Android 12	
Realme V20	Realme	2022/06	Android 12	
Realme GT Neo3T	Realme	2022/06	Android 12	
Realme C30	Realme	2022/06	Android 11	
Realme narzo 50i Prime	Realme	2022/06	Android 11	
Realme GT2 Explorer Master Edition	Realme	2022/07	Android 12	
Realme 9i 5G	Realme	2022/08	Android 12	
Realme C33	Realme	2022/09	Android 12	
Realme C30s	Realme	2022/09	Android 12	
Realme 10/5G	Realme	2022/06	Android 12	
Realme 10 Pro/Pro+	Realme	2022/11	Android 13	
Realme 10s	Realme	2022/12	Android 12	
Realme GT Neo5/240W	Realme	2023/02	Android 13	
Realme C55	Realme	2023/03	Android 13	
Realme V30/V30t	Realme	2023/03	Android 12	
Realme 10T	Realme	2023/03	Android 12	
Realme GT Neo5 SE	Realme	2023/04	Android 13	
Realme narzo N55	Realme	2023/04	Android 13	
Realme GT3	Realme	2023/05	Android 13	
Redmi	Xiaomi	2013/08	Android 4.2 Jelly Bean	
Redmi 1S	Xiaomi	2014/02	Android 4.3 Jelly Bean	
Redmi Note	Xiaomi	2014/03	Android 4.2 Jelly Bean	
Redmi Note 4G	Xiaomi	2014/08	Android 4.2 Jelly Bean	
Redmi 2	Xiaomi	2015/01	Android 4.4 KitKat	
Redmi 2A	Xiaomi	2015/04	Android 4.4 KitKat	
Redmi 2 Prime	Xiaomi	2015/08	Android 4.4 KitKat	
Redmi Note 2	Xiaomi	2015/08	Android 5.0 Lollipop	
Redmi 2 Pro	Xiaomi	2015/10	Android 4.4 KitKat	
Redmi Note 3 (MTK)	Xiaomi	2015/11	Android 5.0 Lollipop	
Redmi Note Prime	Xiaomi	2015/12	Android 4.4 KitKat	
Redmi 3	Xiaomi	2016/01	Android 5.1 Lollipop	
Redmi Note 3/Pro	Xiaomi	2016/03	Android 5.1 Lollipop	
Redmi 3 Pro	Xiaomi	2016/04	Android 5.1 Lollipop	
Redmi 3S	Xiaomi	2016/06	Android 6.0 Marshmallow	
Redmi 3X	Xiaomi	2016/07	Android 6.0 Marshmallow	
Redmi 3S Prime	Xiaomi	2016/08	Android 6.0 Marshmallow	
Redmi Pro	Xiaomi	2016/08	Android 6.0 Marshmallow	
Redmi Note 4 (MTK)	Xiaomi	2016/08	Android 6.0 Marshmallow	
Redmi 4/Pro/Prime	Xiaomi	2016/08	Android 6.0 Marshmallow	
Redmi 4A	Xiaomi	2016/11	Android 6.0 Marshmallow	
Redmi Note 4/4X	Xiaomi	2017/01	Android 6.0 Marshmallow	
Redmi 4X	Xiaomi	2017/02	Android 6.0 Marshmallow	
Redmi Note 5A/Prime	Xiaomi	2017/09	Android 7.1 Nougat	
Redmi 5A	Xiaomi	2017/10	Android 7.1 Nougat	
Redmi 5/Plus	Xiaomi	2017/12	Android 7.1 Nougat	
Redmi Note 5 Pro	Xiaomi	2018/02	Android 7.1 Nougat	
Redmi Note 5	Xiaomi	2018/03	Android 8.1 Oreo	
Redmi S2/Y2	Xiaomi	2018/05	Android 8.1 Oreo	
Redmi 6/6A/Pro	Xiaomi	2018/06	Android 8.1 Oreo	
Redmi Note 6 Pro	Xiaomi	2018/10	Android 8.1 Oreo	
Redmi Note 7	Xiaomi	2019/02	Android 9 Pie	
Redmi Go	Xiaomi	2019/02	Android 8.1 Oreo	
Redmi Note 7 Pro	Xiaomi	2019/03	Android 9 Pie	
Redmi 7	Xiaomi	2019/03	Android 9 Pie	
Redmi Y3	Xiaomi	2019/04	Android 9 Pie	
Redmi 7A	Xiaomi	2019/05	Android 9 Pie	
Redmi K20/Pro	Xiaomi	2019/06	Android 9 Pie	
Redmi Note 8/Pro	Xiaomi	2019/09	Android 9 Pie	
Redmi 8A	Xiaomi	2019/09	Android 9 Pie	
Redmi 8	Xiaomi	2019/10	Android 9 Pie	
Redmi Note 8T	Xiaomi	2019/11	Android 9 Pie	
Redmi K30/5G	Xiaomi	2019/12	Android 10	
Redmi 8A Dual	Xiaomi	2020/02	Android 9 Pie	
Redmi Note 9 Pro (India)/Pro Max/9S	Xiaomi	2020/03	Android 10	
Redmi K30 Pro/Pro Zoom	Xiaomi	2020/03	Android 10	
Redmi Note 9/Pro (Global)	Xiaomi	2020/05	Android 10	
Redmi 10X/Pro	Xiaomi	2020/06	Android 10	
Redmi 9	Xiaomi	2020/06	Android 10	
Redmi 9A	Xiaomi	2020/07	Android 10	
Redmi 9C	Xiaomi	2020/08	Android 10	
Redmi 9 Prime	Xiaomi	2020/08	Android 10	
Redmi K30 Ultra	Xiaomi	2020/08	Android 10	
Redmi K30S Ultra	Xiaomi	2020/11	Android 10	
Redmi Note 9 4G/5G/Pro 5G	Xiaomi	2020/11	Android 10	
Redmi 9 Power	Xiaomi	2020/12	Android 10	
Redmi 9T	Xiaomi	2021/01	Android 10	
Redmi Note 9T	Xiaomi	2021/01	Android 10	
Redmi K40/Pro/Pro+	Xiaomi	2021/03	Android 11	
Redmi Note 10/Pro/Pro Max	Xiaomi	2021/03	Android 11	
Redmi Note 10S/5G	Xiaomi	2021/04	Android 11	
Redmi K40 Gaming	Xiaomi	2021/04	Android 11	
Redmi Note 8 2021	Xiaomi	2021/05	Android 11	
Redmi Note 10 Pro 5G	Xiaomi	2021/06	Android 11	
Redmi Note 10T	Xiaomi	2021/07	Android 11	
Redmi Note 10 JE	Xiaomi	2021/08	Android 11	
Redmi 10	Xiaomi	2021/08	Android 11	
Redmi 10 Prime	Xiaomi	2021/09	Android 11	
Redmi 9 Activ	Xiaomi	2021/09	Android 10	
Redmi 9A Sport/9i Sport	Xiaomi	2021/09	Android 10	
Redmi Note 10 Lite	Xiaomi	2021/10	Android 11	
Redmi Note 11 5G/Pro (China)/Pro+ 5G	Xiaomi	2021/11	Android 11	
Redmi Note 11 4G	Xiaomi	2021/12	Android 11	
Redmi Note 11T	Xiaomi	2021/12	Android 11	
Redmi Note 11/11S/Pro/Pro 5G	Xiaomi	2022/02	Android 11	
Redmi K50G	Xiaomi	2022/02	Android 12	
Redmi Note 11E	Xiaomi	2022/03	Android 12	
Redmi Note 11E Pro	Xiaomi	2022/03	Android 11	
Redmi Note 11 Pro+ (India)	Xiaomi	2022/03	Android 11	
Redmi 10C/10 (India)	Xiaomi	2022/03	Android 11	
Redmi K40S	Xiaomi	2022/03	Android 12	
Redmi K50/Pro	Xiaomi	2022/03	Android 12	
Redmi 10A	Xiaomi	2022/03	Android 11	
Redmi Note 11S 5G	Xiaomi	2022/04	Android 11	
Redmi 10 Power	Xiaomi	2022/04	Android 11	
Redmi 10 2022	Xiaomi	2022/05	Android 11	
Redmi 10 Prime 2022	Xiaomi	2022/05	Android 11	
Redmi Note 11SE	Xiaomi	2022/05	Android 11	
Redmi Note 11T Pro/Pro+	Xiaomi	2022/05	Android 12	
Redmi 10 5G	Xiaomi	2022/06	Android 12	
Redmi K50i	Xiaomi	2022/06	Android 12	
Redmi K50 Ultra	Xiaomi	2022/08	Android 12	
Redmi Note 11 SE	Xiaomi	2022/08	Android 11	
Redmi A1/+	Xiaomi	2022/09	Android 12	
Redmi 11 Prime/Prime 5G	Xiaomi	2022/09	Android 12	
Redmi Note 11R	Xiaomi	2022/09	Android 12	
Redmi Note 12 5G (China)/Pro 5G/Pro+/Discovery Edition	Xiaomi	2022/11	Android 12	
Redmi Note 12 Pro Speed Edition	Xiaomi	2022/12	Android 12	
Redmi K60E	Xiaomi	2023/01	Android 12	
Redmi K60/Pro	Xiaomi	2023/01	Android 13	
Redmi 12C	Xiaomi	2023/01	Android 12	
Redmi Note 12 5G	Xiaomi	2023/01	Android 12	
Redmi A2/+	Xiaomi	2023/03	Android 13	
Redmi Note 12	Xiaomi	2023/03	Android 13	
Redmi Note 12 Turbo	Xiaomi	2023/03	Android 13	
Redmi Note 12 Pro	Xiaomi	2023/04	Android 11	
Redmi Note 12S	Xiaomi	2023/04	Android 13	
Redmi Note 12R Pro	Xiaomi	2023/04	Android 12	
Redmi Note 12T Pro	Xiaomi	2023/06	Android 13	
Redmi 12	Xiaomi	2023/06	Android 13	
Redmi Note 12R	Xiaomi	2023/06	Android 13	
Redmi 12 5G	Xiaomi	2023/08	Android 13	
Redmi K60 Ultra	Xiaomi	2023/08	Android 13	
Redmi Note 13 5G (China)/Pro 5G/Pro+	Xiaomi	2023/09	Android 13	
Redmi 13C	Xiaomi	2023/11	Android 13	
Redmi Note 13R Pro	Xiaomi	2023/11	Android 13	
Redmi K70/Pro/K70E	Xiaomi	2023/11	Android 14	
Redmi 13C 5G	Xiaomi	2023/12	Android 13	
Redmi 12R/13R	Xiaomi	2023/12	Android 13	
Redmi Note 13/5G/Pro	Xiaomi	2024/01	Android 13	
Redmi A3	Xiaomi	2024/02	Android 14	
Redmi Turbo 3	Xiaomi	2024/04	Android 14	
Redmi Note 13R	Xiaomi	2024/05	Android 14	
Redmi A3x	Xiaomi	2024/05	Android 14	
Redmi 13	Xiaomi	2024/06	Android 14	

== S ==
Model	Developer	Release date	Android version at release	Ref.
Samsung Galaxy	Samsung Electronics	2009/04	Android 1.5 Cupcake	
Samsung Galaxy S1	Samsung Electronics	2010/06	Android 2.0 Eclair	
Samsung Galaxy S2	Samsung Electronics	2011/04	Android 2.3 Gingerbread	
Samsung Galaxy Xcover	Samsung Electronics	2011/10	Android 2.3 Gingerbread	
Samsung Galaxy Note	Samsung Electronics	2011/10	Android 2.3 Gingerbread	
Samsung Galaxy Y DUOS	Samsung Electronics	2012/02	Android 2.3 Gingerbread	
Samsung Galaxy S3	Samsung Electronics	2012/05	Android 4.0 Ice Cream Sandwich	
Samsung Galaxy Beam	Samsung Electronics	2012/07	Android 2.3.6 Gingerbread	
Samsung Galaxy Note 2	Samsung Electronics	2012/09	Android 4.0 Ice Cream Sandwich	
Samsung Galaxy Xcover 2	Samsung Electronics	2013/03	Android 4.1 Jelly Bean	
Samsung Galaxy S4	Samsung Electronics	2013/04	Android 4.2 Jelly Bean	
Samsung Galaxy S4 Zoom	Samsung Electronics	2013/07	Android 4.2 Jelly Bean	
Samsung Galaxy Note 3	Samsung Electronics	2013/09	Android 4.3 Jelly Bean	
Samsung Galaxy Note 3 Neo	Samsung Electronics	2014/02	Android 4.3 Jelly Bean	
Samsung Galaxy S5	Samsung Electronics	2014/04	Android 4.4 KitKat	
Samsung Galaxy Beam 2	Samsung Electronics	2014/04	Android 4.2.2 Jelly Bean	
Samsung Galaxy Alpha	Samsung Electronics	2014/09	Android 4.4 KitKat	
Samsung Galaxy Grand Prime	Samsung Electronics	2014/09	Android 4.4 KitKat	
Samsung Galaxy Note 4	Samsung Electronics	2014/10	Android 4.4 KitKat	
Samsung Galaxy Note Edge	Samsung Electronics	2014/11	Android 4.4 KitKat	
Samsung Galaxy A5 Duos	Samsung Electronics	2014/11	Android 4.4 KitKat	
Samsung Galaxy A5	Samsung Electronics	2014/12	Android 4.4 KitKat	
Samsung Galaxy A3/Duos	Samsung Electronics	2014/12	Android 4.4 KitKat	
Samsung Galaxy E7	Samsung Electronics	2015/02	Android 4.4 KitKat	
Samsung Galaxy A7/Duos	Samsung Electronics	2015/02	Android 4.4 KitKat	
Samsung Galaxy S6/Edge	Samsung Electronics	2015/04	Android 5.0 Lollipop	
Samsung Galaxy Xcover 3	Samsung Electronics	2015/04	Android 4.4 KitKat	
Samsung Galaxy A8/Duos	Samsung Electronics	2015/08	Android 5.1 Lollipop	
Samsung Galaxy Note 5	Samsung Electronics	2015/08	Android 5.1 Lollipop	
Samsung Galaxy S6 Edge+	Samsung Electronics	2015/08	Android 5.1 Lollipop	
Samsung Galaxy A3 (2016)/A5 (2016)/A7 (2016)	Samsung Electronics	2015/12	Android 5.1 Lollipop	
Samsung Galaxy A9 (2016)	Samsung Electronics	2016/01	Android 5.1 Lollipop	
Samsung Galaxy J1 (2016)/Express 3/Amp 2	Samsung Electronics	2016/01	Android 5.1.1 Lollipop	
Samsung Galaxy S7/Edge	Samsung Electronics	2016/03	Android 6.0 Marshmallow	
Samsung Galaxy Xcover 3 G389F	Samsung Electronics	2016/04	Android 6.0 Marshmallow	
Samsung Galaxy A9 Pro (2016)	Samsung Electronics	2016/05	Android 6.0 Marshmallow	
Samsung Galaxy C7	Samsung Electronics	2016/06	Android 6.0 Marshmallow	
Samsung Galaxy Note 7	Samsung Electronics	2016/09	Android 6.0 Marshmallow	
Samsung Galaxy A8 (2016)	Samsung Electronics	2016/10	Android 6.0 Marshmallow	
Samsung Galaxy C9 Pro	Samsung Electronics	2016/11	Android 6.0.1 Marshmallow	
Samsung Galaxy A3 (2017)/A5 (2017)/A7 (2017)	Samsung Electronics	2017/01	Android 6.0 Marshmallow	
Samsung Galaxy Xcover 4	Samsung Electronics	2017/04	Android 7.0 Nougat	
Samsung Galaxy S8/+	Samsung Electronics	2017/04	Android 7.0 Nougat	
Samsung Galaxy Note FE	Samsung Electronics	2017/07	Android 7.0 Nougat	
Samsung Galaxy Note 8	Samsung Electronics	2017/08	Android 7.0 Nougat	
Samsung Galaxy C8	Samsung Electronics	2017/09	Android 7.1 Nougat	
Samsung Galaxy C5	Samsung Electronics	2017/10	Android 7.1 Nougat	
Samsung Galaxy A8 (2018)/+	Samsung Electronics	2018/01	Android 7.0 Nougat	
Samsung Galaxy S9/+	Samsung Electronics	2018/03	Android 8.0 Oreo	
Samsung Galaxy A6/+	Samsung Electronics	2018/05	Android 8.0 Oreo	
Samsung Galaxy A8 Star	Samsung Electronics	2018/06	Android 8.0 Oreo	
Samsung Galaxy Note 9	Samsung Electronics	2018/08	Android 8.0 Oreo	
Samsung Galaxy A7 (2018)	Samsung Electronics	2018/10	Android 8.0 Oreo	
Samsung Galaxy A9 (2018)	Samsung Electronics	2018/11	Android 8.0 Oreo	
Samsung Galaxy A6s	Samsung Electronics	2018/11	Android 8.0 Oreo	
Samsung Galaxy A8s	Samsung Electronics	2018/12	Android 9 Pie	
Samsung Galaxy A10	Samsung Electronics	2019/03	Android 9 Pie	
Samsung Galaxy A30	Samsung Electronics	2019/03	Android 9 Pie	
Samsung Galaxy A50	Samsung Electronics	2019/03	Android 9 Pie	
Samsung Galaxy S10/e/+	Samsung Electronics	2019/03	Android 9 Pie	
Samsung Galaxy S10 5G	Samsung Electronics	2019/04	Android 9 Pie	
Samsung Galaxy A20/A40	Samsung Electronics	2019/04	Android 9 Pie	
Samsung Galaxy A2 Core	Samsung Electronics	2019/04	Android 8.0 Oreo	
Samsung Galaxy A20e	Samsung Electronics	2019/05	Android 9 Pie	
Samsung Galaxy A70	Samsung Electronics	2019/05	Android 9 Pie	
Samsung Galaxy A80	Samsung Electronics	2019/05	Android 9 Pie	
Samsung Galaxy A60	Samsung Electronics	2019/06	Android 9 Pie	
Samsung Galaxy Xcover 4s	Samsung Electronics	2019/07	Android 9 Pie	
Samsung Galaxy A10e	Samsung Electronics	2019/08	Android 9 Pie	
Samsung Galaxy Note 10/+	Samsung Electronics	2019/08	Android 9 Pie	
Samsung Galaxy A10s	Samsung Electronics	2019/08	Android 9 Pie	
Samsung Galaxy A30s/A50s	Samsung Electronics	2019/09	Android 9 Pie	
Samsung Galaxy A90 5G	Samsung Electronics	2019/09	Android 9 Pie	
Samsung Galaxy A70s	Samsung Electronics	2019/09	Android 9 Pie	
Samsung Galaxy Z Fold	Samsung Electronics	2019/09	Android 9 Pie	
Samsung Galaxy A20s	Samsung Electronics	2019/10	Android 9 Pie	
Samsung Galaxy A51/A71	Samsung Electronics	2019/12	Android 10	
Samsung Galaxy A01	Samsung Electronics	2020/01	Android 10	
Samsung Galaxy Xcover Pro	Samsung Electronics	2020/01	Android 10	
Samsung Galaxy Z Flip	Samsung Electronics	2020/02	Android 10	
Samsung Galaxy S20/+/Ultra	Samsung Electronics	2020/03	Android 10	
Samsung Galaxy Xcover FieldPro	Samsung Electronics	2020/04	Android 8.0 Oreo	
Samsung Galaxy A31	Samsung Electronics	2020/04	Android 10	
Samsung Galaxy A11	Samsung Electronics	2020/05	Android 10	
Samsung Galaxy A41	Samsung Electronics	2020/05	Android 10	
Samsung Galaxy A51 5G/A71 5G	Samsung Electronics	2020/06	Android 10	
Samsung Galaxy A21	Samsung Electronics	2020/06	Android 10	
Samsung Galaxy A21s	Samsung Electronics	2020/07	Android 10	
Samsung Galaxy A71 5G UW	Samsung Electronics	2020/06	Android 10	
Samsung Galaxy Z Flip 5G	Samsung Electronics	2020/08	Android 10	
Samsung Galaxy Note 20/Ultra	Samsung Electronics	2020/08	Android 10	
Samsung Galaxy Z Fold 2	Samsung Electronics	2020/08	Android 10	
Samsung Galaxy A01 Core	Samsung Electronics	2020/08	Android 10	
Samsung Galaxy A51 5G UW	Samsung Electronics	2020/08	Android 10	
Samsung Galaxy A42 5G	Samsung Electronics	2020/09	Android 10	
Samsung Galaxy S20 FE	Samsung Electronics	2020/10	Android 10	
Samsung Galaxy F41	Samsung Electronics	2020/10	Android 10	
Samsung Galaxy M21s	Samsung Electronics	2020/11	Android 10	
Samsung Galaxy A12	Samsung Electronics	2020/12	Android 10	
Samsung Galaxy A02s/M02s	Samsung Electronics	2021/01	Android 10	
Samsung Galaxy A32 5G	Samsung Electronics	2021/01	Android 11	
Samsung Galaxy S21	Samsung Electronics	2021/01	Android 11	
Samsung Galaxy S21+	Samsung Electronics	2021/01	Android 11	
Samsung Galaxy S21 Ultra	Samsung Electronics	2021/01	Android 11	
Samsung Galaxy S23 Ultra	Samsung Electronics	2023/02	Android 13	
Samsung Galaxy S24 Ultra	Samsung Electronics	2024/01	Android 14	
Samsung Galaxy S25 Ultra	Samsung Electronics	2025/02	Android 15	
Samsung Galaxy A02	Samsung Electronics	2021/01	Android 10	
Samsung Galaxy M02	Samsung Electronics	2021/02	Android 10	
Samsung Galaxy M12	Samsung Electronics	2021/02	Android 11	
Samsung Galaxy F62	Samsung Electronics	2021/02	Android 11	
Samsung Galaxy M62	Samsung Electronics	2021/03	Android 11	
Samsung Galaxy A32	Samsung Electronics	2021/03	Android 11	
Samsung Galaxy Xcover 5	Samsung Electronics	2021/03	Android 11	
Samsung Galaxy A52/A52 5G	Samsung Electronics	2021/03	Android 11	
Samsung Galaxy A72	Samsung Electronics	2021/03	Android 11	
Samsung Galaxy F02s	Samsung Electronics	2021/04	Android 10	
Samsung Galaxy F12	Samsung Electronics	2021/04	Android 11	
Samsung Galaxy Quantum 2	Samsung Electronics	2021/04	Android 11	
Samsung Galaxy F52 5G	Samsung Electronics	2021/06	Android 11	
Samsung Galaxy M32	Samsung Electronics	2021/06	Android 11	
Samsung Galaxy A22/A22 5G	Samsung Electronics	2021/07	Android 11	
Samsung Galaxy Z Fold 3/Z Flip 3	Samsung Electronics	2021/08	Android 11	
Samsung Galaxy M52 5G	Samsung Electronics	2021/10	Android 11	
Samsung Galaxy XCover 6 Pro	Samsung Electronics	2022/09	Android 12, Android 13, Android 14, Android 15	
Samsung Galaxy XCover 7	Samsung Electronics	2024/01	Android 14, Android 15, Android 16	
Samsung Galaxy XCover 7 Pro	Samsung Electronics	2025/04	Android 15, Android 16	
Sony Ericsson Xperia X10	Sony Ericsson	2010/03	Android 1.6 Donut	
Sony Ericsson Xperia X8	Sony Ericsson	2010/06	Android 1.6 Donut	
Sony Ericsson Xperia Play	Sony Ericsson	2011/04	Android 2.3 Gingerbread	
Sony Ericsson Xperia pro	Sony Ericsson	2011/10	Android 2.3 Gingerbread	
Sony Xperia Z	Sony Mobile	2013/02	Android 4.1 Jelly Bean	
Sony Xperia Z Ultra	Sony Mobile	2013/09	Android 4.1 Jelly Bean	
Sony Xperia Z1	Sony Mobile	2013/09	Android 4.1 Jelly Bean	
Sony Xperia Z1 Compact	Sony Mobile	2014/02	Android 4.1 Jelly Bean	
Sony Xperia Z2	Sony Mobile	2014/05	Android 4.4 KitKat	
Sony Xperia Z3/Compact	Sony Mobile	2014/09	Android 4.4 KitKat	
Sony Xperia Z4	Sony Mobile	2015/06	Android 5.0 Lollipop	
Sony Xperia Z5/Compact	Sony Mobile	2015/10	Android 5.0 Lollipop	
Sony Xperia Z5 Premium	Sony Mobile	2015/11	Android 5.0 Lollipop	
Sony Xperia X/Performance	Sony Mobile	2016/02	Android 6.0 Marshmallow	
Sony Xperia XA	Sony Mobile	2016/06	Android 6.0 Marshmallow	
Sony Xperia XA Ultra	Sony Mobile	2016/07	Android 6.0 Marshmallow	
Sony Xperia X Compact	Sony Mobile	2016/09	Android 6.0 Marshmallow	
Sony Xperia XZ	Sony Mobile	2016/09	Android 6.0 Marshmallow	
Sony Xperia XZs/Premium	Sony Mobile	2017/02	Android 7.0 Nougat	
Sony Xperia XA1	Sony Mobile	2017/04	Android 7.0 Nougat	
Sony Xperia XA1 Ultra	Sony Mobile	2017/05	Android 7.0 Nougat	
Sony Xperia L1	Sony Mobile	2017/06	Android 7.0 Nougat	
Sony Xperia XZ1/Compact	Sony Mobile	2017/08	Android 8.0 Oreo	
Sony Xperia XA1 Plus	Sony Mobile	2017/10	Android 7.0 Nougat	
Sony Xperia L2	Sony Mobile	2018/01	Android 7.0 Nougat	
Sony Xperia XA2/Ultra	Sony Mobile	2018/02	Android 8.0 Oreo	
Sony Xperia XZ2/Compact	Sony Mobile	2018/02	Android 8.0 Oreo	
Sony Xperia XZ2 Premium	Sony Mobile	2018/04	Android 8.0 Oreo	
Sony Xperia XZ3	Sony Mobile	2018/08	Android 9 Pie	
Sony Xperia XA2 Plus	Sony Mobile	2018/09	Android 8.0 Oreo	
Sony Xperia 10/10 Plus	Sony Mobile	2019/02	Android 9 Pie	
Sony Xperia L3	Sony Mobile	2019/02	Android 8.0 Oreo	
Sony Xperia 1	Sony Mobile	2019/05	Android 9 Pie	
Sony Xperia 5	Sony Mobile	2019/09	Android 9 Pie	
Sony Xperia 8	Sony Mobile	2019/10	Android 9 Pie	
Sony Xperia L4	Sony Mobile	2020/04	Android 9 Pie	
Sony Xperia 1 II	Sony Mobile	2020/05	Android 10	
Sony Xperia 10 II	Sony Mobile	2020/05	Android 10	
Sony Xperia 5 II	Sony Mobile	2020/10	Android 10	
Sony Xperia Pro	Sony Mobile	2021/01	Android 10	
Sony Xperia 10 III	Sony Mobile	2021/04	Android 11	
Sony Xperia 5 III	Sony Mobile	2021/04	Android 11	
Sony Xperia 1 III	Sony Mobile	2021/04	Android 11	
Starmobile Diamond	Starmobile	2013/04	Android 4.1.1 Jellybean	
Starmobile Diamond D3	Starmobile	2014/01	Android 4.2.2 Jellybean	
Starmobile Diamond X1	Starmobile	2014/01	Android 4.2.2 Jellybean	
Starmobile Knight	Starmobile	2013/07	Android 4.2.2 Jellybean	
Starmobile Octa	Starmobile	2014/03	Android 4.2.2 Jellybean	
Starmobile Up Snap	Starmobile	2014/12	Android 4.4 KitKat	
Surface Duo	Microsoft	2020/09	Android 10	
Surface Duo 2	Microsoft	2021/10	Android 11	

== T ==
Model	Developer	Release date	Android version at release	Ref.
T-Mobile G1	T-Mobile	2008/09	Android 1.0	
T-Mobile REVVL 7 5G	T-Mobile	2024/06	Android 14	
TCL Plex	TCL	2019/10	Android 9 Pie	
TCL 10L	TCL	2020/05	Android 10	
TCL 10 Pro	TCL	2020/05	Android 10	
TCL 10 SE	TCL	2020/07	Android 10	
TCL 10 5G	TCL	2020/07	Android 10	
TCL 10 Plus	TCL	2020/09	Android 10	
Tecno Phantom 6/Plus	Tecno Mobile	2016/09	Android 6.0 Marshmallow	
Tecno Camon CX	Tecno Mobile	2017/03	Android 7.0 Nougat	
Tecno Camon CX Air	Tecno Mobile	2017/04	Android 7.0 Nougat	
Tecno Spark	Tecno Mobile	2017/05	Android 7.0 Nougat	
Tecno Spark Plus	Tecno Mobile	2017/06	Android 7.0 Nougat	
Tecno Phantom 8	Tecno Mobile	2017/09	Android 7.0 Nougat	
Tecno Spark Pro	Tecno Mobile	2017/10	Android 7.0 Nougat	
Tecno Camon CM	Tecno Mobile	2017/12	Android 7.0 Nougat	
Tecno Spark CM	Tecno Mobile	2017/12	Android 7.0 Nougat	
Tecno Camon X/Pro	Tecno Mobile	2018/03	Android 8.1 Oreo	
Tecno Spark 2	Tecno Mobile	2018/06	Android 8.1 Oreo	
Tecno Camon 11/Pro	Tecno Mobile	2018/09	Android 8.1 Oreo	
Tecno Camon iACE2/2X	Tecno Mobile	2019/02	Android 8.1 Oreo	
Tecno Spark 3/Pro	Tecno Mobile	2019/04	Android 9 Pie	
Tecno Phantom 9	Tecno Mobile	2019/07	Android 9 Pie	
Tecno Spark Go	Tecno Mobile	2019/08	Android 9 Pie	
Tecno Spark 4/Air/Lite	Tecno Mobile	2016/08	Android 9 Pie	
Tecno Camon 12	Tecno Mobile	2019/08	Android 9 Pie	
Tecno Camon 12 Pro	Tecno Mobile	2019/09	Android 9 Pie	
Tecno Camon 12 Air	Tecno Mobile	2019/10	Android 9 Pie	
Tecno Camon 15/Pro	Tecno Mobile	2020/02	Android 10	
Tecno Camon 15 Air/Premier	Tecno Mobile	2020/04	Android 10	
Tecno Spark 5	Tecno Mobile	2020/05	Android 10	
Tecno Camon 19	Tecno Mobile	2022/06	Android 12	
Tecno Spark 5 Air	Tecno Mobile	2020/05	Android 10	
Tecno Spark 5 Pro	Tecno Mobile	2020/05	Android 10	
Tecno Spark Power 2	Tecno Mobile	2020/06	Android 10	
Tecno Pouvoir 4/Pro	Tecno Mobile	2020/07	Android 10	
Tecno Camon 16 Premier	Tecno Mobile	2020/09	Android 10	
Tecno Spark 6 Air	Tecno Mobile	2020/09	Android 10	
Tecno Spark 6	Tecno Mobile	2020/09	Android 10	
Tecno Camon 16	Tecno Mobile	2020/10	Android 10	
Tecno Pova	Tecno Mobile	2020/10	Android 10	
Tecno Spark 9	Tecno Mobile	2022/06	Android 12	
Tecno Phantom V Fold	Tecno Mobile	2023/04	Android 13	
Tecno Phantom V Flip	Tecno Mobile	2023/10	Android 13	

== U ==
Model	Developer	Release date	Android version at release	Ref.
Ubuntu Edge	Canonical	Unreleased	Unknown Android Version	
Unihertz TickTock	Unihertz	2021	Android 11	
Umidigi A9/+/Max	Umidigi	2020/12	Android 11	

== V ==
Model	Developer	Release date	Android version at release	Ref.
Vertu Ti	Vertu	2013/02	Android 4.0 Ice Cream Sandwich	
Vivo X1	Vivo	2012/11	Android 4.1 Jelly Bean	
Vivo X3	Vivo	2013/08	Android 4.1 Jelly Bean	
Vivo X3S	Vivo	2014/12	Android 4.1 Jelly Bean	
Vivo X5/Max	Vivo	2014/12	Android 4.4 KitKat	
Vivo X5Max+	Vivo	2015/03	Android 4.4 KitKat	
Vivo X5Pro	Vivo	2015/05	Android 5.0 Lollipop	
Vivo X5Max Platinum	Vivo	2015/06	Android 4.4 KitKat	
Vivo V1	Vivo	2015/07	Android 5.0 Lollipop	
Vivo V1 Max	Vivo	2015/08	Android 5.0 Lollipop	
Vivo X6/Plus	Vivo	2015/11	Android 5.0 Lollipop	
Vivo X6S/Plus	Vivo	2016/03	Android 5.0 Lollipop	
Vivo V3/Max	Vivo	2016/04	Android 5.0 Lollipop	
Vivo X7/Plus	Vivo	2016/07	Android 5.0 Lollipop	
Vivo X9/Plus	Vivo	2016/07	Android 6.0 Marshmallow	
Vivo V5	Vivo	2016/11	Android 6.0 Marshmallow	
Vivo V5 Plus	Vivo	2017/01	Android 6.0 Marshmallow	
Vivo V5 Lite/Y66	Vivo	2017/02	Android 6.0 Marshmallow	
Vivo V5s	Vivo	2017/05	Android 6.0 Marshmallow	
Vivo X9s/Plus	Vivo	2017/07	Android 7.0 Nougat	
Vivo V7+	Vivo	2017/09	Android 7.0 Nougat	
Vivo X20/Plus	Vivo	2017/09	Android 7.0 Nougat	
Vivo V7	Vivo	2017/12	Android 7.0 Nougat	
Vivo X20 Plus UD	Vivo	2018/01	Android 7.0 Nougat	
Vivo X21/UD	Vivo	2018/03	Android 8.0 Oreo	
Vivo V9/Youth	Vivo	2018/04	Android 8.0 Oreo	
Vivo X21i	Vivo	2018/05	Android 8.0 Oreo	
Vivo NEX	Vivo	2018/06	Android 8.0 Oreo	
Vivo V11	Vivo	2018/09	Android 8.0 Oreo	
Vivo X23	Vivo	2018/09	Android 8.0 Oreo	
Vivo V11i	Vivo	2018/09	Android 8.0 Oreo	
Vivo NEX Dual Display	Vivo	2018/12	Android 9 Pie	
Vivo V15/Pro	Vivo	2019/03	Android 9 Pie	
Vivo X27/Pro	Vivo	2019/03	Android 9 Pie	
Vivo V17 Neo	Vivo	2019/08	Android 9 Pie	
Vivo NEX 3	Vivo	2019/09	Android 9 Pie	
Vivo V17 Pro	Vivo	2019/09	Android 9 Pie	
Vivo V17	Vivo	2019/12	Android 9 Pie	
Vivo X30/Pro	Vivo	2019/12	Android 9 Pie	
Vivo NEX 3S	Vivo	2020/03	Android 10	
vivo Z5	Vivo	2019	Android 9	
vivo Z6 5G	Vivo	2020/04	Android 10	
Vivo V19	Vivo	2020/04	Android 10	
Vivo X50 Lite	Vivo	2020/05	Android 10	
Vivo X50/Pro/Pro+	Vivo	2020/06	Android 10	
Vivo V19 Neo	Vivo	2020/06	Android 10	
Vivo V20 Pro	Vivo	2020/09	Android 10	
Vivo X50e	Vivo	2020/10	Android 10	
Vivo V20 SE	Vivo	2020/10	Android 10	
Vivo V20	Vivo	2020/10	Android 11	
Vivo X51	Vivo	2020/10	Android 10	
Vivo V20 (2021)	Vivo	2020/12	Android 11	
Vivo X60/Pro/Pro+	Vivo	2021/01	Android 11	
vivo Y12s	Vivo	2020	Android 10	
vivo Y1s	Vivo	2020	Android 10	
vivo Y20	Vivo	2021	Android 10	
vivo V21/V21e	Vivo	2021	Android 11	
vivo Y53s	Vivo	2021	Android 11	
vivo S10	Vivo	2021	Android 11	
Vivo X70/Pro/Pro+	Vivo	2021/09	Android 11	
vivo V23e	Vivo	2021/11	Android 11	
vivo V23e 5G	Vivo	2021/12	Android 11	
vivo Y21T	Vivo	2022/01	Android 11	
vivo Y33t	Vivo	2022/01	Android 11	
vivo Y55 5G	Vivo	2022	Android 11	
vivo Y75 5G	Vivo	2022	Android 11	
vivo V23/Pro	Vivo	2022/01	Android 12	
Vivo Y21a	Vivo	2022	Android 11	
Vivo Y01	Vivo	2022/03	Android 11	
Vivo Y21G	Vivo	2022/04	Android 11	
Vivo X80/Pro	Vivo	2022/04	Android 12	
Vivo X Note/Fold	Vivo	2022/04	Android 12	
Vivo X Fold+	Vivo	2022/09	Android 12	
Vivo X90/Pro/Pro+	Vivo	2022/11	Android 13	
Vivo X Fold2/Flip	Vivo	2023/04	Android 13	
Vivo X90s	Vivo	2023/06	Android 13	
Vivo X100/Pro	Vivo	2023/11	Android 14	
Vivo Y100i	Vivo	2023/12	Android 13	
Vivo Y36i	Vivo	2023/12	Android 13	
Vivo S18/Pro/e	Vivo	2023/12	Android 14	
Vivo XFold 6	Vivo	2026/07	Android 16	

== W ==
Model	Developer	Release date	Android version at release	Ref.
Wickedleak Wammy Passion X	Wickedleak	2014/5	Android 4.2 Jelly Bean	

== X ==
Model	Developer	Release date	Android version at release	Ref.
Xiaomi Mi 1	Xiaomi	2011/12	Android 2.3 Gingerbread	
Xiaomi Mi 1S	Xiaomi	2012/08	Android 4.0 Ice Cream Sandwich	
Xiaomi Mi 2	Xiaomi	2012/10	Android 4.1 Jelly Bean	
Xiaomi Mi 2S/A	Xiaomi	2013/04	Android 4.1 Jelly Bean	
Xiaomi Mi 3/TD	Xiaomi	2013/12	Android 4.3 Jelly Bean	
Xiaomi Mi 4	Xiaomi	2014/08	Android 4.4 KitKat	
Xiaomi Mi Note	Xiaomi	2015/01	Android 4.4 KitKat	
Xiaomi Mi Note Pro	Xiaomi	2015/05	Android 5.0 Lollipop	
Xiaomi Mi 4i	Xiaomi	2015/04	Android 5.0 Lollipop	
Xiaomi Mi 4c	Xiaomi	2015/09	Android 5.1 Lollipop	
Xiaomi Mi 4S	Xiaomi	2016/03	Android 5.1 Lollipop	
Xiaomi Mi 5	Xiaomi	2016/04	Android 6.0 Marshmallow	
Xiaomi Mi Max/Pro	Xiaomi	2016/05	Android 6.0 Marshmallow	
Xiaomi Mi 5s/Plus	Xiaomi	2016/10	Android 6.0 Marshmallow	
Xiaomi Mi Note 2	Xiaomi	2016/11	Android 6.0 Marshmallow	
Xiaomi Mi MIX	Xiaomi	2016/11	Android 6.0 Marshmallow	
Xiaomi Mi 5c	Xiaomi	2017/03	Android 6.0 Marshmallow	
Xiaomi Mi 6	Xiaomi	2017/04	Android 7.1 Nougat	
Xiaomi Mi Max 2	Xiaomi	2017/06	Android 7.1 Nougat	
Xiaomi Mi 5X/Mi A1	Xiaomi	2017/08	Android 7.1 Nougat	
Xiaomi Mi Note 3	Xiaomi	2017/09	Android 7.1 Nougat	
Xiaomi Mi MIX 2	Xiaomi	2017/09	Android 7.1 Nougat	
Xiaomi Mi MIX 2S	Xiaomi	2018/04	Android 8.1 Oreo	
Xiaomi Mi 6X/Mi A2	Xiaomi	2018/04	Android 8.1 Oreo	
Xiaomi Mi 8/SE/EE	Xiaomi	2018/06	Android 8.1 Oreo	
Xiaomi Mi Max 3	Xiaomi	2018/07	Android 8.1 Oreo	
Xiaomi Mi 8 Pro/Lite	Xiaomi	2018/09	Android 8.1 Oreo	
Xiaomi Mi MIX 3	Xiaomi	2018/11	Android 9 Pie	
Xiaomi Mi Play	Xiaomi	2018/12	Android 8.1 Oreo	
Xiaomi Mi 9/SE	Xiaomi	2019/03	Android 9 Pie	
Xiaomi Mi MIX 3 5G	Xiaomi	2019/05	Android 9 Pie	
Xiaomi Mi 9T	Xiaomi	2019/06	Android 9 Pie	
Xiaomi Mi A3	Xiaomi	2019/07	Android 9 Pie	
Xiaomi Mi 9T Pro	Xiaomi	2019/08	Android 9 Pie	
Xiaomi Mi 9 Lite	Xiaomi	2019/09	Android 9 Pie	
Xiaomi Mi 9 Pro	Xiaomi	2019/09	Android 9 Pie	
Xiaomi Mi Note 10/Pro	Xiaomi	2019/11	Android 9 Pie	
Xiaomi Mi 10/Pro	Xiaomi	2020/02	Android 10	
Xiaomi Mi 10 Lite	Xiaomi	2020/05	Android 10	
Xiaomi Mi 10 Youth	Xiaomi	2020/05	Android 10	
Xiaomi Mi Note 10 Lite	Xiaomi	2020/05	Android 10	
Xiaomi Mi 10 Ultra	Xiaomi	2020/08	Android 10	
Xiaomi Mi 10T/Pro/Lite	Xiaomi	2020/10	Android 10	
Xiaomi Mi 11	Xiaomi	2021/01	Android 11	
Xiaomi Mi 10i	Xiaomi	2021/01	Android 10	
Xiaomi Mi 10S	Xiaomi	2021/03	Android 11	
Xiaomi Mi 11 Pro/Ultra/11i	Xiaomi	2021/04	Android 11	
Xiaomi Mi 11 Lite/Lite 5G	Xiaomi	2021/04	Android 11	
Xiaomi Mi MIX Fold	Xiaomi	2021/04	Android 11	
Xiaomi Mi 11X/Pro	Xiaomi	2021/04	Android 11	
Xiaomi MIX 4	Xiaomi	2021/08	Android 11	
Xiaomi 11T/Pro	Xiaomi	2021/09	Android 11	
Xiaomi 11 Lite 5G NE	Xiaomi	2021/09	Android 11	
Xiaomi 12/Pro/X	Xiaomi	2021/12	Android 12	
Xiaomi 11i/HyperCharge	Xiaomi	2022/01	Android 11	
Xiaomi Civi 1S	Xiaomi	2022/04	Android 12	
Xiaomi 12 Pro Dimensity	Xiaomi	2022/07	Android 12	
Xiaomi 12S/Pro/Ultra	Xiaomi	2022/07	Android 12	
Xiaomi 12 Lite	Xiaomi	2022/07	Android 12	
Xiaomi MIX Fold 2	Xiaomi	2022/08	Android 12	
Xiaomi Civi 2	Xiaomi	2022/09	Android 12	
Xiaomi 12T/Pro	Xiaomi	2022/10	Android 12	
Xiaomi 13/Pro	Xiaomi	2022/12	Android 13	
Xiaomi 13 Lite	Xiaomi	2023/03	Android 12	
Xiaomi 13 Ultra	Xiaomi	2023/04	Android 13	
Xiaomi Civi 3	Xiaomi	2023/05	Android 13	
Xiaomi MIX Fold 3	Xiaomi	2023/08	Android 13	
Xiaomi 13T/Pro	Xiaomi	2023/09	Android 13	
Xiaomi 14/Pro	Xiaomi	2023/11	Android 14	
Xiaomi 14 Ultra	Xiaomi	2024/02	Android 14	
Xiaomi Civi 4 Pro	Xiaomi	2024/03	Android 14	
Xiaomi 14 Civi	Xiaomi	2024/06	Android 14	
Xiaomi 14T/Pro	Xiaomi	2024/09	Android 14	
Xiaomi 15/Pro	Xiaomi	2024/10	Android 15	
Xiaomi 15 Ultra	Xiaomi	2025/02	Android 15	
Xiaomi 15S Pro	Xiaomi	2025/05	Android 15	
Xiaomi Civi 5 Pro	Xiaomi	2025/05	Android 15	

== Y ==
Model	Developer	Release date	Android version at release	Ref.
YotaPhone	Yota	2013/11	Android 4.2.2 Jelly Bean	
Samsung Galaxy Z Tri Fold	Samsung	2025/12	Android 16	
YotaPhone 2	Yota	2014/12	Android 4.4.3 KitKat	
YU Yureka	YU Televentures	2015/01	Android 4.4.4 KitKat	

== Z ==
Model	Developer	Release date	Android version at release	Ref.
ZTE Racer	ZTE	2010/07	Android 2.0 Eclair	
ZTE Blade	ZTE	2010/11	Android 2.0 Eclair	
ZTE Libra	ZTE	2011/09	Android 2.0 Eclair	
ZTE Racer II	ZTE	2011/09	Android 2.2 Froyo	
ZTE Skate	ZTE	2011/09	Android 2.3 Gingerbread	
ZTE Score	ZTE	2011/09	Android 2.3 Gingerbread	
ZTE Warp	ZTE	2011/10	Android 2.3 Gingerbread	
ZTE Avail	ZTE	2011/12	Android 2.3 Gingerbread	
ZTE FTV Phone	ZTE	2011/12	Android 2.2 Froyo	
ZTE Blade II V880+	ZTE	2012/03	Android 2.3 Gingerbread	
ZTE Score M	ZTE	2012/03	Android 2.3 Gingerbread	
ZTE V880E	ZTE	2012/05	Android 2.3 Gingerbread	
ZTE Kis V788	ZTE	2012/07	Android 2.3 Gingerbread	
ZTE Grand X	ZTE	2012/07	Android 4.0 Ice Cream Sandwich	
ZTE Grand X IN	ZTE	2012/09	Android 4.0 Ice Cream Sandwich	
ZTE Blade III	ZTE	2012/09	Android 4.0 Ice Cream Sandwich	
ZTE Grand Era	ZTE	2012/09	Android 4.0 Ice Cream Sandwich	
ZTE Warp Sequent	ZTE	2012/09	Android 4.0 Ice Cream Sandwich	
ZTE Grand X LTE	ZTE	2012/11	Android 4.0 Ice Cream Sandwich	
ZTE Flash	ZTE	2012/11	Android 4.0 Ice Cream Sandwich	
ZTE Groove X501	ZTE	2012/11	Android 2.3 Gingerbread	
ZTE Kis III V790	ZTE	2012/11	Android 2.3 Gingerbread	
ZTE N910	ZTE	2012/12	Android 4.0 Ice Cream Sandwich	
ZTE Era	ZTE	2012/12	Android 4.0 Ice Cream Sandwich	
ZTE V887	ZTE	2012/12	Android 4.0 Ice Cream Sandwich	
ZTE V889M	ZTE	2012/12	Android 4.0 Ice Cream Sandwich	
ZTE Avid 4G	ZTE	2012/12	Android 4.0 Ice Cream Sandwich	
ZTE Grand S	ZTE	2013/03	Android 4.1 Jelly Bean	
ZTE Director	ZTE	2013/03	Android 4.0 Ice Cream Sandwich	
ZTE Blade C V807	ZTE	2013/04	Android 4.1 Jelly Bean	
ZTE Blade III Pro	ZTE	2013/04	Android 4.1 Jelly Bean	
ZTE Blade G V880G	ZTE	2013/04	Android 4.1 Jelly Bean	
ZTE Blade G2	ZTE	2013/07	Android 4.1 Jelly Bean	
ZTE Blade V	ZTE	2013/09	Android 4.1 Jelly Bean	
ZTE Blade Q/Maxi/Mini	ZTE	2013/10	Android 4.1 Jelly Bean	
ZTE Blade L2	ZTE	2014/05	Android 4.1 Jelly Bean	
ZTE Blade Vec 3G/4G	ZTE	2014/11	Android 4.4 KitKat	
ZTE Blade S6	ZTE	2015/02	Android 5.0 Lollipop	
ZTE Blade G/Lux	ZTE	2015/02	Android 4.4 KitKat	
ZTE Blade L3	ZTE	2015/02	Android 5.0 Lollipop	
ZTE Blade L3 Plus	ZTE	2015/03	Android 4.4 KitKat	
ZTE Blade S6 Plus	ZTE	2015/04	Android 5.0 Lollipop	
ZTE Blade Qlux 4G	ZTE	2015/06	Android 4.4 KitKat	
ZTE Blade Q Pro	ZTE	2015	Android 5.0 Lollipop	
ZTE Blade Apex 3	ZTE	2015/06	Android 4.4 KitKat	
ZTE Blade A410	ZTE	2015/06	Android 5.0 Lollipop	
ZTE Blade A460	ZTE	2015/06	Android 5.0 Lollipop	
ZTE Axon Pro/Lux	ZTE	2015/07	Android 5.0 Lollipop	
ZTE Blade D6	ZTE	2015/07	Android 5.0 Lollipop	
ZTE Axon Elite	ZTE	2015/09	Android 5.0 Lollipop	
ZTE Axon mini	ZTE	2015/10	Android 5.0 Lollipop	
ZTE Blade S7	ZTE	2015/10	Android 5.0 Lollipop	
ZTE Axon	ZTE	2015/10	Android 5.0 Lollipop	
ZTE Blade X3/5/9	ZTE	2015/11	Android 5.0 Lollipop	
ZTE Axon Max	ZTE	2015/12	Android 5.0 Lollipop	
ZTE Blade V7/Lite	ZTE	2016/02	Android 6.0 Marshmallow	
ZTE Axon 7	ZTE	2016/05	Android 6.0 Marshmallow	
ZTE Axon 7 mini	ZTE	2016/09	Android 6.0 Marshmallow	
ZTE Axon 7 Max	ZTE	2016/10	Android 6.0 Marshmallow	
ZTE Axon 7s	ZTE	2017/04	Android 7.0 Nougat	
ZTE Maven 2	ZTE	2017/07	Android 6.0 Marshmallow	
ZTE Blade A6	ZTE	2017/08	Android 7.0 Nougat	
ZTE Axon M	ZTE	2017/10	Android 7.0 Nougat	
ZTE Blade X	ZTE	2017/10	Android 7.0 Nougat	
ZTE Blade A3	ZTE	2017/11	Android 7.0 Nougat	
ZTE Tempo Go	ZTE	2018/02	Android 8.0 Oreo	
ZTE Blade V9/Vita	ZTE	2018/02	Android 8.0 Oreo	
ZTE Axon 9 Pro	ZTE	2018/08	Android 8.0 Oreo	
ZTE Blade A7 Vita	ZTE	2018/12	Android 8.0 Oreo	
ZTE Blade V10/Vita	ZTE	2019/02	Android 9 Pie	
ZTE Axon 10 Pro/5G	ZTE	2019/02	Android 9 Pie	
ZTE Blade L8	ZTE	2019/04	Android 9 Pie	
ZTE Blade A3 (2019)	ZTE	2019/04	Android 9 Pie	
ZTE Blade A7	ZTE	2019/05	Android 9 Pie	
ZTE Blade A5 (2019)	ZTE	2019/05	Android 9 Pie	
ZTE Blade A20	ZTE	2019/10	Android 9 Pie	
ZTE Blade 10 Prime	ZTE	2019/11	Android 9 Pie	
ZTE Blade A7 Prime	ZTE	2019/11	Android 9 Pie	
ZTE Blade Max View	ZTE	2019/11	Android 7.0 Nougat	
ZTE Axon 10s Pro 5G	ZTE	2020/02	Android 10	
ZTE Axon 11 4G/5G	ZTE	2020/03	Android 10	
ZTE Blade V 2020	ZTE	2020/05	Android 10	
ZTE Axon 11 SE 5G	ZTE	2020/06	Android 10	
ZTE Axon 20 5G	ZTE	2020/09	Android 10	
ZTE Blade A7s 2020	ZTE	2020/09	Android 10	
ZTE Blade 20 5G	ZTE	2020/09	Android 10	
ZTE Axon 20 4G	ZTE	2020/09	Android 10	
ZTE S30/Pro/SE	ZTE	2021/04	Android 11	
ZTE Axon 30 Pro/Ultra	ZTE	2021/04	Android 11	
ZTE Blade 11 Prime	ZTE	2021/04	Android 10	
ZTE Blade A51	ZTE	2021/05	Android 11	
ZTE Blade A31	ZTE	2021/07	Android 11	
ZTE Axon 30	ZTE	2021/08	Android 11	
ZTE Blade A71	ZTE	2021/10	Android 11	
ZTE Blade L9	ZTE	2021/10	Android 11	
ZTE Blade A31 Plus	ZTE	2021/10	Android 11	
ZTE Voyage 20 Pro	ZTE	2021/08	Android 11	

== See also ==
- List of Android TV devices
