= NotCompatible =

Android-platform based malware

NotCompatible is complex malware that infects Android phones. It was revealed in late 2014 and was thought to have infected hundreds of thousands of phones.
