= Acer beTouch E140 =

Smartphone manufactured by Acer Inc.

The Acer beTouch E140 is a smartphone manufactured by Acer Inc. utilizing the Android 2.2 (Froyo) operating system.

== Main specifications ==
- Operating System: Android 2.2
- Display: 2.8-inch touch screen
- Processor: 600 MHz
- Wi-Fi 802.11 b / g,
- Bluetooth 2.1, IR
- FM-radio
- Camera: 3.2MP
- Battery: 1300 mAH
- Weight: 115 grams

== Release ==
The Acer beTouch 140 was unveiled in December 2010. The device is to be released in the UK though the exact date is not known. Price has not been announced but it should be around €199

== See also ==
- Galaxy Nexus
- List of Android devices
