= Wickedleak Wammy Passion X =

Smartphone model

The Wickedleak Wammy Passion X is a smartphone designed and manufactured by the Indian company Wickedleak. The phone is waterproof and has a 1.7GHz octa-core MediaTek MT6592 processor. The phone also includes a 5-inch IPS touchscreen with DragonTrail scratch-resistant glass (1920×1080 px). The phone is dual-SIM and includes 2 GB RAM running Android 4.2 Jelly Bean. The phone has a 13 MP rear camera with 1080p FullHD video recording and 5 MP front camera with 720p HD video recording. Wammy Passion X is the world's first Hydrophobic Smartphone using Aquaprotect Technology to protect it from Water Damage. The Successor to this SmartphonePhone was Wickedleak Wammy Note 3 Launched by Wickedleak in September 2014. Wickedleak has carried forward the AquaProtect Technology after Wammy Passion X to its other smartphones as well.
