= Huawei U8100 =

- Brand: Huawei
- Manufacturer: Huawei
- Type: Smartphone
- First released: March 2010
- Compatible networks: GSM / HSPA
- Form factor: Candybar
- Dimensions: 107.5 mm (4.23 in) H 57.0 mm (2.24 in) W 13.8 mm (0.54 in) D
- Weight: 104.0 g (3.67 oz)
- Operating system: Android 2.1 (Eclair)
- CPU: One-core
- Removable storage: microSD, up to 32 GB
- SIM: Single SIM (Regular-SIM)
- Battery: 1150 mAh Removable Li-Ion
- Rear camera: 3.15 MP with LED flash
- Front camera: VGA
- Display: 2.80-inch TFT touchscreen, 240 x 320 pixels
- Model: U8100
- References: "Huawei U8100 Full Specifications". PhoneArena.

The Huawei U8100 is an Android touchscreen mobile phone released in 2010 at the Mobile World Congress in Barcelona and launched WIND Mobile Canada. It features an HSDPA bandwith of 2100, a 2-8-inch TFT display, a Qualcomm MSM7225 processor an MP3 player, an FM radio, a 3.2-migapixel camera, and A-GPS for navigation.
