= Samsung Galaxy Beam =

Samsung Galaxy Beam may refer to:

- Samsung Galaxy Beam i8520
- Samsung Galaxy Beam i8530
