= List of NFC-enabled mobile devices =

NFC stands for near-field communication.

== Feature phones ==
Brand	Name	Platform itel A56	First release	Availability	NFC 12 controller
BenQ	T80		March 2008	all versions	
LG	600V Contactless			all versions	
Motorola	Slvr L7		Q1 2005	with special battery cover only	
Nokia	3220	Series 40	Q2 2004	NFC Shell version only	
Nokia	5140/5140i	Series 40	Q4 2003	NFC Shell version only	
Nokia	6131	Series 40	February 2006	Nokia 6131 NFC version only	
Nokia	6212 classic	Series 40	April 2009	all versions	
Nokia	6216 classic	Series 40	Cancelled	all versions	
Sagem	Cosyphone			all versions	
Sagem	my700X ContactLess		February 2006	all versions	
Samsung	SGH-D500		Q4 2004	Samsung SGH-D500E variant only	
Samsung	SGH-X700		Q2 2005	Samsung SGH-X700N variant only	
Sonim	XP1301 Core NFC			all versions	NFC

== Smartphones ==
=== A-H ===
Brand	Name	Platform	First release	Availability	NFC controller
Acer	CloudMobile S500	Android	September 2012	all versions	
Acer	Liquid E1	Android	March 2013	single SIM variant only	
Acer	Liquid Express E320	Android	November 2011	selected versions, region specific	
Acer	Liquid Glow E330	Android	August 2012	all versions	
Acer	Liquid S2	Android	December 2013	all versions	
Alcatel	1x	Android	May 2018	5059Y version only	
Alcatel	3	Android	February 2018	5052Y version only	
Alcatel	3v	Android	February 2018	5099Y version only	
Alcatel	3x	Android	May 2018	5058Y version only	
Alcatel	5	Android	February 2018	5086 version only	
Alcatel	5v	Android	August 2018	all versions	
Alcatel	A7	Android	September 2017	all versions	
Alcatel	Hero 2	Android	September 2014	8030B/8030Y	
Alcatel	Idol 2	Android	Q2 2014	all versions	
Alcatel	Idol 2 Mini S	Android	June 2014	6036Y, Optional (6036A/6036X)	
Alcatel	Idol 2 S	Android	June 2014	6050Y/6050F	
Alcatel	Idol 3	Android	June 2015	4.7 and 5.5 variants	
Alcatel	Idol 3C	Android	Q4 2015	all versions	
Alcatel	Idol 4	Android	June 2016	all versions	
Alcatel	Idol 4S	Android	July 2016	all versions	
Alcatel	One Touch 922	Android	November 2011	only available in Russia	
Alcatel	One Touch 996	Android	February 2012	available in Israel as Orange Infinity 996	
Alcatel	One Touch X'Pop	Android	May 2013	OT-5035Y	
Alcatel	Pop 2 (5)	Android	May 2015	7043Y/7043K	
Alcatel	Pop 2 (5) Premium	Android	May 2015	7044Y	
Alcatel	Pop 4S	Android	Q3 2016	selected versions	
Alcatel	Pop D3	Android	September 2014	all versions	
Alcatel	Pop S3	Android	Q2 2014	all versions	
Alcatel	Pop S7	Android	Q2 2014	all versions	
Alcatel	Pop S9	Android	Q2 2014	all versions	
Allview	V1 Viper S	Android	February 2014	all versions	
Allview	X1 Xtreme	Android	August 2015	all versions	
Allview	X2 Xtreme	Android	July 2014	all versions	
Amazon	Fire Phone	Android	July 2014	all versions	
Apple	iPhone 6	iOS	September 2014	all versions	NXP PN65V
Apple	iPhone 6 Plus	iOS	September 2014	all versions	NXP PN65V
Apple	iPhone SE (1st generation)	iOS	March 2016	all versions	NXP PN66V10
Apple	iPhone 6S Plus	iOS	September 2015	all versions	NXP PN66V10
Apple	iPhone 6S	iOS	September 2015	all versions	NXP PN66V10
Apple	iPhone 7	iOS	September 2016	all versions	NXP PN67V04
Apple	iPhone 7 Plus	iOS	September 2016	all versions	NXP PN67V04
Apple	iPhone 8	iOS	September 2017	all versions	NXP PN80V
Apple	iPhone 8 Plus	iOS	September 2017	all versions	NXP PN80V
Apple	iPhone X	iOS	October 2017	all versions	NXP PN80V
Apple	iPhone XR	iOS	October 2018	all versions	NXP 100VB27
Apple	iPhone XS	iOS	September 2018	all versions	NXP 100VB27
Apple	iPhone XS Max	iOS	September 2018	all versions	NXP 100VB27
Apple	iPhone 11	iOS	September 2019	all versions	
Apple	iPhone 11 Pro	iOS	September 2019	all versions	
Apple	iPhone 11 Pro Max	iOS	September 2019	all versions	
Apple	iPhone SE (2nd generation)	iOS	April 2020	all versions	
Archos	50 Diamond	Android	January 2015	all versions	
Archos	50b Helium 4G	Android	December 2014	all versions	
Archos	Diamond Omega	Android	November 2017	all versions	
Asus	Fonepad Note FHD6	Android	November 2013	ME560CG	
Asus	PadFone 2	Android	December 2012	all versions	
Asus	PadFone Infinity	Android	April 2013	all versions	
Asus	PadFone Infinity 2	Android	October 2013	all versions	
Asus	PadFone S	Android	July 2014	all versions	
Asus	PadFone X	Android	July 2014	all versions	
Asus	Pegasus 2 Plus	Android	December 2015	X550	
Asus	ROG Phone	Android	October 2018		
Asus	ZenFone 2	Android	January 2015	ZE551ML	Broadcom BCM20795
Asus	Zenfone 3 Deluxe	Android	August 2016	ZS550KL, ZS570KL	
Asus	Zenfone 4	Android	October 2017	ZE554KL	
Asus	Zenfone 4 Pro	Android	October 2017	ZS551KL	
Asus	Zenfone 5 Lite	Android	May 2018	ZC600KL	
Asus	Zenfone 5	Android	June 2018	ZE620KL	
Asus	Zenfone 5Z	Android	June 2018	ZS620KL	
Asus	Zenfone 6	Android	May 2019	ZS630KL, also known as Zenfone 6Z	
Asus	Zenfone 7	Android	September 2020	ZS670KS	
Asus	Zenfone 7 Pro	Android	September 2020	ZS671KS	
Asus	Zenfone Zoom	Android	December 2015	ZX551ML	
BenQ	F5	Android	September 2014	all versions	
BenQ	F52	Android	May 2015	all versions	
BlackBerry	Bold 9790	BlackBerry OS	November 2011	selected versions	
BlackBerry	Bold 9900 / 9930	BlackBerry OS	May 2011	all versions	
BlackBerry	Classic	BlackBerry 10	December 2014	all versions, including Non Camera variant	
BlackBerry	Curve	BlackBerry OS	September 2011	Curve 9350, 9360, 9370, 9380 versions only	
BlackBerry	DTEK50	Android	August 2016	all versions	
BlackBerry	DTEK60	Android	October 2016	all versions	
BlackBerry	KeyOne	Android	April 2017	all versions	
BlackBerry	BlackBerry Key2	Android	June 2018	all versions, including LE versions	
BlackBerry	Motion	Android	December 2017	all versions	
BlackBerry	Passport	BlackBerry 10	September 2014	all versions	
BlackBerry	Porsche Design P'9981	BlackBerry OS	December 2011	all versions	
BlackBerry	Porsche Design P'9982	BlackBerry 10	December 2013	all versions	
BlackBerry	Porsche Design P'9983	BlackBerry 10	October 2014	all versions	
BlackBerry	Priv	Android	November 2015	all versions	
BlackBerry	Q5	BlackBerry 10	August 2013	all versions	Inside Secure
BlackBerry	Q10	BlackBerry 10	March 2013	all versions	Inside Secure (SECUREAD NFC 972-DC-C6)
BlackBerry	Z10	BlackBerry 10	January 2013	all versions	Inside Secure (SECUREAD NFC 972-DC-C6)
BlackBerry	Z30	BlackBerry 10	October 2013	all versions	Inside Secure (SECUREAD NFC 972-DC-C6)
BLU	Life Pure XL	Android	May 2014	all versions	
BLU	Pure XL	Android	September 2015	all versions	
BQ	Aquaris M5	Android	2015	all versions	
BQ	Aquaris M5.5	Android	2015	all versions	
BQ	Aquaris U	Android	September 2016	all versions	
BQ	Aquaris U2	Android	October 2017	all versions	
BQ	Aquaris V / V Plus	Android	October 2017	all versions	
BQ	Aquaris X / X Pro	Android	June 2017	all versions	
BQ	Aquaris X5 Plus	Android	July 2016	all versions	
Casio	G'zOne Commando 4G LTE	Android	June 2013	all versions	
Casio	G'zOne CA201L	Android	June 2013	all versions	STMicroelectronics ST21NFCA
Cat	S40	Android	August 2015	all versions	
Cat	S50	Android	November 2014	all versions	
Cat	S60	Android	June 2016	all versions	
Cetrix	Cetrix CB250	Android	January 2014	all versions	
Cetrix	Cetrix CV300	Android	January 2014	all versions	
Energizer	Hardcase H550S	Android	January 2018	all versions	
Essential	PH-1	Android	August 2017	all versions	
FAMOCO	FX100	Android	November 2013	all versions	PN65O (PN544 controller & P5CN145 secure element)
FAMOCO	FX200	Android		all versions	
FAMOCO	FX300	Android		all versions	
Gionee	Elife E7	Android	2013	all versions	
Gionee	Elife E7 Mini	Android	April 2014	all versions	
Gionee	Elife E8	Android	October 2015	all versions	
Gionee	M7	Android	September 2017	all versions	
Gionee	M7 Plus	Android	Q1 2018	all versions	
Gionee	S11S	Android	December 2017	all versions	
Google	Nexus S	Android	16 December 2010	all versions	
Google	Nexus 4	Android	November 2012	all versions	Broadcom BCM20793
Google	Nexus 5	Android	30 October 2013	all versions	Broadcom BCM20793M
Google	Nexus 6	Android	October 2014	all versions	Broadcom BCM20795
Google	Nexus 5X	Android	October 2015	all versions	NXP PN548
Google	Nexus 6P	Android	October 2015	all versions	NXP PN548
Google	Pixel	Android	October 2016	all versions	NXP 55102
Google	Pixel XL	Android	October 2016	all versions	NXP 55102
Google	Pixel 2	Android	October 2017	all versions	
Google	Pixel 2 XL	Android	October 2017	all versions	
Google	Pixel 3	Android	November 2018	all versions	
Google	Pixel 3 XL	Android	November 2018	all versions	
Google	Pixel 3a	Android	May 2019	all versions	
Google	Pixel 3a XL	Android	May 2019	all versions	
Google	Pixel 4	Android	October 2019	all versions	
Google	Pixel 4 XL	Android	October 2019	all versions	
Google	Pixel 4a	Android	August 2020	all versions	
Google	Pixel 5	Android	October 2020	all versions	
Google	Pixel 6	Android	October 2021	all versions	
Google	Pixel 6 Pro	Android	October 2021	all versions	
Google	Pixel 6a	Android	July 2022	all versions	
Google	Pixel 7	Android	October 2022	all versions	
Google	Pixel 7 Pro	Android	October 2022	all versions	
Google	Pixel 7a	Android	May 2023	all versions	
Google	Pixel 8	Android	October 2023	all versions	
Google	Pixel 8 Pro	Android	October 2023	all versions	
Google	Pixel 8a	Android	May 2024	all versions	
Google	Pixel 9	Android	October 2024	all versions	
Google	Pixel 9 Pro	Android	October 2024	all versions	
Google	Pixel 9 Pro XL	Android	October 2024	all versions	
Hisense	Sero 5	Android		all versions	
HP	Elite x3	Android	August 2016	all versions	
Honor	4 Play	Android	September 2014	G620S-L01	
Honor	6	Android	August 2014	H60-L12	
Honor	6 Plus	Android	December 2014	LTE variant only	
Honor	7i	Android	August 2015	all versions	
Honor	8	Android	July 2016	all versions	
Honor	8X	Android	September 2018	JSN-L21	
Honor	8 Pro	Android	April 2017	all versions	
Honor	9	Android	July 2017	all versions	
Honor	10	Android	May 2018	all versions	
Honor	10i	Android	April 2019	all versions	
Honor	10 Lite	Android	November 2018	selected markets	
Honor	Magic	Android	December 2016	all versions	
Honor	Magic 2	Android	November 2018	all versions	
Honor	Magic 2 3D	Android	March 2019	all versions	
Honor	Note 10	Android	August 2018	all versions	
Honor	Play	Android	August 2018	selected markets	
Honor	V8	Android	May 2016	KNT-AL10, KNT-AL20	
Honor	View 10	Android	January 2018	all versions	
Honor	View 20	Android	December 2018	all versions	
HTC	10	Android	May 2016	all versions	
HTC	10 evo	Android	November 2016	all versions	
HTC	10 Lifestyle	Android	July 2016	all versions	
HTC	Amaze 4G	Android	October 2011	all versions	
HTC	Butterfly	Android	December 2012	all versions (including variants such as the Droid DNA and J Butterfly)	NXP PN544
HTC	Butterfly 2	Android	September 2014	all versions	
HTC	Butterfly 3	Android	October 2015	all versions	
HTC	Butterfly S	Android	July 2013	all versions	
HTC	Desire 10 Pro	Android	December 2016	all versions	
HTC	HTC Desire 12s	Android	December 2018	all versions	
HTC	Desire 501	Android	February 2014	all versions, including dual SIM variant	
HTC	Desire 510	Android	September 2014	selected versions	
HTC	Desire 530	Android	March 2016	all versions	
HTC	Desire 600	Android	June 2013	all versions	
HTC	Desire 610	Android	May 2014	selected versions	
HTC	Desire 612	Android	October 2014	selected versions	
HTC	Desire 620	Android	December 2014	single SIM variant only	
HTC	Desire 650	Android	December 2016	EMEA region only	
HTC	Desire 816	Android	March 2014	selected versions	
HTC	Desire 820	Android	November 2014	all versions, including dual SIM variant	
HTC	Desire 830	Android	May 2016	all versions, including dual SIM variant	
HTC	Desire C	Android	June 2012	selected versions	
HTC	Desire Eye	Android	November 2014	all versions	NXP PN547
HTC	Desire U	Android	June 2013	all versions	
HTC	Droid Incredible 4G LTE	Android	December 2014	also known as Incredible 4G or Incredible 3	
HTC	EVO 4G LTE	Android	May 2012	all versions	
HTC	First	Android	April 2013	all versions	NXP PN544
HTC	Incredible S	Android	February 2011	Chinese version	
HTC	One	Android	March 2013	all versions, including dual SIM variant	NXP PN544
HTC	One A9	Android	November 2015	all versions	NXP PN548
HTC	One A9s	Android	November 2016	all versions	NXP PN548
HTC	One E8	Android	June 2014	all versions	NXP PN547
HTC	One E9	Android	May 2015	all versions	NXP PN547
HTC	One E9+	Android	May 2015	all versions	NXP PN547
HTC	One M8	Android / Windows Phone	March 2014	selected versions	NXP PN544
HTC	One M8s	Android / Windows Phone	May 2015	selected versions	
HTC	One M9	Android / Windows Phone	March 2015	all versions	NXP PN547
HTC	One M9 Prime Camera	Android	May 2016	all versions	
HTC	One M9+	Android	May 2015	all versions	NXP PN547
HTC	One M9+ Supreme Camera	Android	October 2015	all versions	
HTC	One M9s	Android	November 2015	all versions	
HTC	One Max	Android	October 2013	all versions	
HTC	One ME	Android	July 2015	all versions	
HTC	One Mini 2	Android	May 2014	all versions, including One Remix	
HTC	One S9	Android	June 2016	all versions	
HTC	One SV	Android	January 2013	all versions	
HTC	One VX	Android	November 2012	all versions	NXP PN544
HTC	One X	Android	May 2012	all versions	NXP PN544
HTC	One X+	Android	November 2012	all versions	NXP PN544
HTC	One X9	Android	January 2016	all versions	
HTC	One XL	Android	May 2012	all versions	NXP PN544
HTC	U Play	Android	February 2017	all versions	
HTC	U Ultra	Android	February 2017	all versions	
HTC	U11	Android	June 2017	all versions	
HTC	U11 Eyes	Android	January 2018	all versions	
HTC	U11 Life	Android	December 2017	all versions	
HTC	U11+	Android	December 2017	all versions	
HTC	U12+	Android	June 2018	all versions	
HTC	U12 Life	Android	September 2018	all versions	
HTC	Windows Phone 8X	Windows Phone	November 2012	all versions, including 8XT	NXP PN544
Huawei	Ascend G300	Android	May 2012	U8815N version only	
Huawei	Ascend G510	Android	April 2013	U8815N version only	
Huawei	Ascend G6 4G	Android	May 2014	all versions	
Huawei	Ascend G600	Android	September 2012	all versions	
Huawei	Ascend G620s	Android	November 2014	all versions	
Huawei	Ascend G630	Android	March 2014	all versions	
Huawei	Ascend G7	Android	October 2014	G7-L01, G7-L03	
Huawei	Ascend GX1	Android	December 2014	SC-CL00	
Huawei	Ascend Mate	Android	March 2013	all versions	
Huawei	Ascend Mate7	Android	October 2014	all versions, including Monarch edition	
Huawei	Ascend P2	Android	April 2013	all versions	
Huawei	Ascend P7	Android	June 2014	all versions, including Sapphire Edition and dual SIM variant	
Huawei	Ascend P7 mini	Android	May 2014	all versions	
Huawei	Ascend W1	Windows Phone	January 2013	optional	
Huawei	Ascend Y100	Android	May 2012	U8655, optional	
Huawei	Ascend Y200	Android	May 2012	U8185, optional	
Huawei	G8	Android	October 2015	all versions	
Huawei	Mate RS Porsche Design	Android	April 2018	all versions	
Huawei	Mate 8	Android	November 2015	all versions	
Huawei	Mate 9	Android	December 2016	all versions, including Porsche Design edition	
Huawei	Mate 10	Android	November 2017	all versions, including Pro variant and Porsche Design edition	
Huawei	Mate 20	Android	November 2018	all versions	
Huawei	Mate 20 Lite	Android	September 2018	SNE-LX1 version only	
Huawei	Mate 20 Pro	Android	November 2018	all versions	
Huawei	Mate 20 RS Porsche Design	Android	December 2018	all versions	
Huawei	Mate 20 X	Android	November 2018	all versions	
Huawei	Mate S	Android	October 2015	all versions, including dual SIM variant	
Huawei	Mate X	Android	Exp. June 2019	all versions	
Huawei	nova plus	Android	October 2016	all versions	
Huawei	nova 2s	Android	December 2017	all versions	
Huawei	nova 3	Android	August 2018	PAR-LX1 version only	
Huawei	P Smart	Android	December 2017	FIG-LX1 only	
Huawei	P Smart (2019)	Android	December 2017	POT-LX1 only	
Huawei	P8	Android	April 2015	all versions	
Huawei	P8 Lite	Android	May 2015	ALE-L21	
Huawei	P8 Lite (2017)	Android	January 2017	Also known as Huawei P9 Lite (2017), Huawei Honor 8 Lite, Huawei Nova Lite, Huawei GR3 (2017)	
Huawei	P9	Android	April 2016	EVA-L09 only	NXP 54802
Huawei	P9 Lite	Android	April 2016	L31, L21 only	
Huawei	P9 Plus	Android	May 2016	VIE-L09, VIE-L29	
Huawei	P10	Android	March 2017	VTR-L09, VTR-L29, VTR-AL00, VTR-TL00	NXP PN548
Huawei	P10 Lite	Android	March 2017	WAS-LX1A, WAS-LX1 only	
Huawei	P10 Plus	Android	April 2017	VKY-L09, VKY-L29, VKY-AL00	
Huawei	P20	Android	April 2018	all versions	NXP PN551
Huawei	P20 Lite	Android	March 2018	all versions	
Huawei	P20 Pro	Android	April 2018	all versions	NXP 55102 PN548
Huawei	P30	Android	March 2019	all versions	NXP PN80T
Huawei	P30 Lite	Android	April 2019	MAR-L21ME	
Huawei	P30 Pro	Android	March 2019	MAR-L21ME	
Huawei	U8650 Sonic	Android	June 2011	U8650-1 (Turkcell T20) version only	
Huawei	Y6 (2017)	Android	July 2017	all versions	
Huawei	Y6 (2018)	Android	May 2018	ATU-L11	
Huawei	Y6 (2019)	Android	May 2019	AMN-LX1	
Huawei	Y7 (2018)	Android	April 2018	LDN-L01 version only	
Huawei	Y7 Prime (2018)	Android	April 2018	LDN-TL10 version only	
Huawei	Y7 Pro (2019)	Android	January 2019	selected markets	

=== I-P ===
Brand	Name	Platform	First release	Availability	NFC controller
IceMobile	Shine	Android	July 2011	optional	
Intel	AZ210	Android	April 2012	also known as Xolo X900 (Intel AZ510) in India and Orange San Diego in the UK and France	
Jolla	Jolla	Sailfish	November 2013	all versions	NXP PN544
Karbonn	Titanium X	Android	January 2014	all versions	
Kyocera	Brigadier	Android	July 2014	all versions	
Kyocera	DuraForce	Android	November 2014	all versions	
Kyocera	DuraForce Pro	Android	October 2016	all versions	
Kyocera	DuraForce XD	Android	November 2015	all versions	
Kyocera	Hydro Elite	Android	Q3 2013	C6750	
Kyocera	Torque	Android	March 2013	E6710	
LeEco	Le Max	Android	January 2016	all versions	
LeEco	Le Max 2	Android	May 2016	all versions	
LeEco	Le Pro3	Android	October 2016	all versions	
LeEco	Le Pro 3 AI Edition	Android	April 2017	all versions	
Lenovo	Lenovo K80	Android	April 2015	all versions	
Lenovo	Vibe K4 Note	Android	January 2016	all versions	
Lenovo	Vibe P1	Android	September 2015	all versions	
Lenovo	Vibe P1 Turbo	Android	February 2016	all versions	
Lenovo	P2	Android	November 2016	all versions	
Lenovo	Vibe S90 Sisley	Android	November 2014	all versions	
Lenovo	Vibe X3	Android	December 2015	all versions	
Lenovo	Vibe Z2 Pro	Android	September 2014	all versions	
Lenovo	Z5 Pro	Android	November 2018	all versions	
Lenovo	Z5 Pro GT	Android	January 2019	all versions	
Lenovo	Z6 Pro	Android	April 2019	all versions	
Lenovo	Z6 Youth	Android	May 2019	all versions	
LG	AKA	Android	May 2015	all versions	
LG	Escape	Android	September 2012	P870	
LG	GX	Android	January 2014	F310L	
LG	Intuition	Android	September 2012	VS950	
LG	K8	Android	April 2016	all versions	
LG	K8 (2017)	Android	April 2017	all versions	
LG	K10	Android	January 2016	all versions	
LG	K10 (2017)	Android	February 2017	all versions	
LG	K10 (2018)	Android	June 2018	all versions	
LG	K30	Android	May 2018	all versions	
LG	K40	Android	April 2019	all versions	
LG	L50	Android	July 2014	all versions	
LG	Lucid 3	Android	April 2014	VS876	
LG	Mach	Android	December 2012	LS860	
LG	Optimus 3D Cube	Android	Q3 2012	SU870	
LG	Optimus 3D Max	Android	May 2012	P720	
LG	Optimus 4X HD	Android	June 2012	P880	NXP PN544
LG	Optimus Elite	Android	May 2012	LS696	
LG	Optimus F3	Android	June 2013	LS720, MS659 versions only	
LG	Optimus F3Q	Android	February 2014	all versions	
LG	Optimus F5	Android	May 2013	all versions	
LG	Optimus F6	Android	September 2013	D500, D505 versions only	
LG	Optimus F7	Android	June 2013	all versions	
LG	F70	Android	May 2014	all versions	
LG	Optimus G	Android	November 2012	E970, E975, LS970 versions only	Broadcom BCM20793M
LG	Optimus G Pro	Android	April 2013	all versions	
LG	G Stylo	Android	May 2015	all versions	
LG	G Vista	Android	August 2014	D631, Gx2, VS880	
LG	G Vista 2	Android	November 2015	all versions	
LG	G2	Android	September 2013	all versions	Broadcom BCM20793M
LG	G2 Mini LTE	Android	May 2014	South American variant, D620, D620R, D620K	
LG	G3	Android	June 2014	all versions, including CDMA variant, dual LTE variant, G3 A, G3 LTE-A, G3 S, G3 Screen	NXP PN547
LG	G4	Android	April 2015	all versions, including dual SIM, G4 Beat, G4 Stylus, G4c variant	NXP 47883
LG	G5	Android	April 2016	all versions, including G5 SE variant	NXP 54802
LG	G6	Android	March 2017	all versions	
LG	G7 One	Android	November 2018	all versions	
LG	G7 ThinQ	Android	May 2018	all versions, including G7 Fit	
LG	G8 ThinQ / G8s ThinQ	Android	June 2019	all versions	
LG	G Flex	Android	November 2013	all versions	
LG	G Flex 2	Android	February 2015	all versions	
LG	G Pro 2	Android	April 2014	all versions	
LG	K8	Android	April 2016	all versions	
LG	L Fino	Android	September 2014	all versions	
LG	Optimus L5	Android	June 2012	E610, E612	
LG	Optimus L5 II	Android	April 2013	E460	
LG	Optimus L7	Android	May 2012	selected versions	
LG	Optimus L7 II	Android	March 2013	P710, P714	
LG	Optimus L70	Android	April 2014	D320N version only	
LG	Optimus L9	Android	November 2012	all versions	
LG	Optimus L9 II	Android	October 2013	D605	
LG	L90	Android	March 2014	all versions	
LG	Optimus LTE	Android	December 2011	LU6200, VS920 versions only	
LG	Optimus LTE II	Android	August 2012	F160S, LG F160K, LG F160L versions only	
LG	Optimus LTE Tag	Android	Q3 2012	F120L, F120S, F120K	
LG	Optimus Net	Android	July 2011	P690 version only	
LG	Optimus Vu	Android	November 2012	F100S, P895	
LG	Optimus Vu II	Android	Q4 2012	all versions	
LG	Optimus Vu III	Android	October 2013	F300L	
LG	Prada 3.0	Android	January 2012	all versions	
LG	Q Stylo 4	Android	June 2018	all versions	
LG	Q Stylus	Android	August 2018	all versions	
LG	Q6	Android	August 2017	all versions	
LG	Q7	Android	June 2018	all versions	
LG	Q8 (2017)	Android	August 2018	all versions	
LG	Q8 (2018)	Android	October 2018	all versions	
LG	Q60	Android	May 2019	all versions	
LG	Spectrum II 4G	Android	October 2012	VS930	
LG	Spirit	Android	March 2015	H445 version only	
LG	Stylo 3 Plus	Android	May 2017	all versions	
LG	Stylus 2 Plus	Android	July 2016	all versions	
LG	Stylus 3	Android	March 2017	all versions	
LG	V10	Android	October 2015	all versions	
LG	V20	Android	October 2016	all versions	
LG	V30	Android	September 2017	all versions	
LG	V30S ThinQ	Android	March 2018	all versions	
LG	V35 ThinQ	Android	June 2018	all versions	
LG	V40 ThinQ	Android	November 2018	all versions	
LG	V50 ThinQ 5G	Android	May 2019	all versions	
LG	Viper 4G LTE	Android	April 2012	LS840	
LG	Volt	Android	May 2014	LS740	
LG	X cam	Android	June 2016	all versions	
LG	X mach	Android	September 2016	all versions	
LG	X screen	Android	March 2016	selected versions	
LG	X Skin	Android	August 2016	all versions	
LG	X venture	Android	May 2017	all versions	
LG	X4+	Android	February 2018	all versions	
LG	X5	Android	August 2016	all versions	
Meizu	MX3	Android	October 2013	all versions	
Meizu	MX4 Pro	Android	December 2014	all versions	
Meizu	PRO 5	Android	October 2015	all versions	
Meizu	PRO 6	Android	May 2016	all versions	
Meizu	PRO 6 Plus	Android	November 2016	all versions	
Meizu	PRO 6s	Android	December 2016	all versions	
Meizu	PRO 7 / PRO 7 Plus	Android	August 2017	all versions	
Meizu	16s	Android	April 2019	all versions	
Meizu	16s Pro	Android	August 2019	all versions	
Meizu	17 / 17 Pro	Android	May 2020	all versions	
Meizu	18 / 18 Pro	Android	March 2021	all versions	
Meizu	18s / 18s Pro	Android	September 2021	all versions	
Meizu	20	Android	May 2023	all versions	
Meizu	20 Pro / 20 Infinity	Android	June 2023	all versions	
Meizu	20 Classic	Android	October 2023	all versions	
Meizu	21	Android	November 2023	all versions	
Meizu	21 Pro	Android	March 2024	all versions	
Meizu	21 Note	Android	May 2024	all versions	
Meizu	mblu 22	Android	May 2025	all versions	
Meizu	Note 21 Pro	Android	October 2024	all versions	
Meizu	Note 22	Android	May 2025	all versions	
Meizu	Note 22 5G / Note 16	Android	May 2025	all versions	
Meizu	Note 22 Pro / Note 16 Pro	Android	May 2025	all versions	
Microsoft	Lumia 640	Windows Phone	April 2015	all versions, except RM-1076 and RM-1077	
Microsoft	Lumia 650	Windows Phone	February 2016		NXP PN547
Microsoft	Lumia 950	Windows Phone	November 2015		NXP PN547
Microsoft	Lumia 950 XL	Windows Phone	November 2015		NXP PN547
Motorola	Razr HD	Android	September 2012	all versions (including variants such as Droid Razr Maxx HD)	
Motorola	Razr M	Android	September 2012	all versions	NXP PN544
Motorola	Moto E4	Android	June 2017	XT1766	
Motorola	Moto E4 Plus	Android	June 2017	Europe	
Motorola	Moto G4 Play	Android	August 2016	XT1604	
Motorola	Moto G5 Plus	Android	April 2017	XT1684, XT1685	
Motorola	Moto G5S Plus	Android	August 2017	XT1802, XT1803, XT1804, XT1805	
Motorola	Moto G6	Android	April 2018	Europe version only	
Motorola	Moto G6 Play	Android	May 2018	Europe version only	
Motorola	Moto G6 Plus	Android	May 2018	all versions	
Motorola	Moto G7	Android	March 2019	European version only	
Motorola	Moto G7 Plus	Android	March 2019	European version only	
Motorola	Moto G7 Power	Android	February 2019	selected regions only	
Motorola	Moto X	Android	August 2013	all versions	NXP 44701 PN544
Motorola	Moto X (2014)	Android	September 2014	all versions	
Motorola	Moto X Pro	Android	November 2014	also known as Google Nexus 6	
Motorola	Moto X Style	Android	September 2015	also known as Moto X Pure Edition	
Motorola	Moto X Play	Android	August 2015	including dual SIM variant	
Motorola	Moto X Force	Android	November 2015	branded as the Droid Turbo 2 in the US	
Motorola	Moto X4	Android	October 2017	all versions	
Motorola	Moto Z	Android	September 2016	all versions	
Motorola	Moto Z Force	Android	September 2016	all versions	
Motorola	Moto Z Play	Android	September 2016	all versions	
Motorola	Moto Z2 Force	Android	August 2017	all versions	
Motorola	Moto Z2 Play	Android	June 2017	all versions	
Motorola	Moto Z3	Android	August 2018	all versions	
Motorola	Moto Z4	Android	June 2019	all versions	
Motorola	One	Android	October 2018	all versions, including One Power	
Motorola	One Vision	Android	May 2019	all versions	
Motorola	Photon Q	Android	August 2012	all versions	
Motorola	Razr D3	Android	October 2012	all versions	
Motorola	Razr I	Android	October 2012	all versions	NXP PN544
NEC	Terrain	Android	June 2013	all versions	
Nokia	3	Android	June 2017	all versions	
Nokia	3.1	Android	May 2018	APAC & EMEA versions only	
Nokia	5	Android	July 2017	all versions	
Nokia	5.1	Android	August 2018	all versions	
Nokia	6	Android	January 2017	all versions	
Nokia	6.1	Android	April 2018	all versions	
Nokia	7	Android	October 2017	all versions	
Nokia	7 Plus	Android	March 2018	all versions	
Nokia	8	Android	October 2017	all versions	
Nokia	8 Sirocco	Android	April 2018	all versions	
Nokia	603	Symbian	October 2011	all versions	
Nokia	700	Symbian	September 2011	all versions	
Nokia	701	Symbian	September 2011	all versions	
Nokia	801T	Symbian	September 2012	all versions	
Nokia	808 PureView	Symbian	June 2012	all versions	
Nokia	C7	Symbian	October 2010	all versions (including Nokia Astound and Nokia Oro variants)	NXP PN544
Nokia	N9	MeeGo	September 2011	all versions	NXP PN544
Nokia	Lumia 610	Windows Phone	September 2012	Nokia Lumia 610 NFC version only	
Nokia	Lumia 620	Windows Phone	January 2013	all versions	
Nokia	Lumia 720	Windows Phone	April 2013	all versions	
Nokia	Lumia 730	Windows Phone	September 2014	all versions	
Nokia	Lumia 735	Windows Phone	September 2014	all versions	
Nokia	Lumia 810	Windows Phone	November 2012	all versions	
Nokia	Lumia 820	Windows Phone	November 2012	all versions	INSIDE Secure
Nokia	Lumia 822	Windows Phone	November 2012	all versions	
Nokia	Lumia 830	Windows Phone	September 2014	all versions	
Nokia	Lumia 920	Windows Phone	November 2012	all versions	INSIDE Secure MicroRead v3.4
Nokia	Lumia 925	Windows Phone	June 2013	all versions	NXP PN544 (C3)
Nokia	Lumia 928	Windows Phone	May 2013	all versions	
Nokia	Lumia 930	Windows Phone	July 2014	all versions	
Nokia	Lumia 1020	Windows Phone	July 2013	all versions	
Nokia	Lumia 1520	Windows Phone	November 2013	all versions	
Nokia	Lumia Icon	Windows Phone	February 2014	all versions	
OnePlus	One	Android (Cyanogen OS)	June 2014	all versions	
OnePlus	3	Android (Oxygen OS)	June 2016	all versions	
OnePlus	3T	Android (Oxygen OS)	November 2016	all versions	NXP NSD404X
OnePlus	5	Android (Oxygen OS)	June 2017	all versions	
OnePlus	5T	Android (Oxygen OS)	November 2017	all versions	
OnePlus	6	Android (Oxygen OS)	May 2018	all versions	NXP Q3303
OnePlus	6T	Android (Oxygen OS)	November 2018	all versions, including McLaren edition	
OnePlus	7	Android (Oxygen OS)	June 2019	all versions	
OnePlus	7 Pro	Android (Oxygen OS)	June 2019	all versions, including the 5G version	
Oppo	A7n	Android	May 2019	all versions	
Oppo	A9 / A9x	Android	May 2019	all versions	
Oppo	A53	Android	December 2015	all versions	
Oppo	Find 5	Android	February 2013	all versions	
Oppo	Find 7	Android	May 2014	all versions	
Oppo	Find 7a	Android	March 2014	all versions	
Oppo	N1	Android	October 2013	all versions	
Oppo	N3	Android	January 2015	all versions	
Oppo	Reno	Android	April 2019	all versions	
Oppo	Reno 10x zoom	Android	June 2019	all versions, including the 5G version	
Oppo	Reno Z	Android	June 2019	all versions	
Oppo	R15 Pro	Android	April 2018	all versions	
Oppo	RX17 Pro	Android	November 2018	all versions	
Oppo	U3	Android	April 2015	all versions	
Panasonic	Eluga DL1	Android	April 2012	EB-3901	
Panasonic	Eluga Power	Android	May 2012	all versions	
Panasonic	Lumix Smart Camera CM1	Android	December 2014	DMC-CM1	
Pantech	Discover	Android	January 2013	all versions	
Pantech	LTE EX IM-A820L	Android	January 2012	all versions	
Pantech	No 6	Android	February 2013	all versions	
Pantech	R3 IM-A850L	Android	October 2012	all versions	
Philips	W8555	Android	November 2013	all versions	
Prestigio	Multiphone 5501 Duo	Android	Q1 2014	all versions	
Prestigio	Multiphone 7500	Android	Q1 2014	all versions	
Prestigio	Multiphone 7600 Duo	Android	Q1 2014	all versions	

=== Q-Z ===
Brand	Name	Platform	Release date	Availability	NFC controller
QMobile	Noir E8	Android	November 2015	all versions	
Razer	Phone 2	Android	October 2018	all versions	
Samsung	Ativ Odyssey	Windows Phone	January 2013	all versions	
Samsung	Ativ S	Windows Phone	December 2012	all versions	
Samsung	Ativ S Neo	Windows Phone	August 2013	all versions	
Samsung	Galaxy A3 (2015)	Android	December 2014	A300F, A300FU, A300G, A300M, A300YZ versions only	
Samsung	Galaxy A3 (2016)	Android	December 2015	all versions	
Samsung	Galaxy A3 (2017)	Android	January 2017	all versions	
Samsung	Galaxy A5 (2015)	Android	December 2014	A500F, A500FQ, A500FU, A500M, A500Y, A500YZ versions only	
Samsung	Galaxy A5 (2016)	Android	December 2015	all versions	
Samsung	Galaxy A5 (2017)	Android	January 2017	all versions	
Samsung	Galaxy A6 (2018) and A6 (2018)	Android	May 2018	all versions	
Samsung	Galaxy A7 (2015)	Android	February 2015	all versions	
Samsung	Galaxy A7 (2016)	Android	December 2015	all versions	
Samsung	Galaxy A7 (2017)	Android	January 2017	all versions	
Samsung	Galaxy A7 (2018)	Android	October 2018	all versions	
Samsung	Galaxy A8 (2015)	Android	August 2015	all versions	
Samsung	Galaxy A8 (2016)	Android	October 2016	all versions	
Samsung	Galaxy A8 (2018) and A8+ (2018)	Android	January 2018	all versions	
Samsung	Samsung Galaxy A8 Star / A9 Star	Android	June 2018	all versions	
Samsung	Samsung Galaxy A8s	Android	December 2018	all versions	
Samsung	Galaxy A9 (2016)	Android	January 2016	all versions	
Samsung	Galaxy A9 Pro (2016)	Android	May 2016	all versions	
Samsung	Galaxy A20	Android	April 2019	selected regions only	
Samsung	Galaxy A20e	Android	May 2019	all versions	
Samsung	Galaxy A30s	Android	September 2019	selected regions only	
Samsung	Galaxy A40	Android	April 2019	selected regions only	
Samsung	Galaxy A50	Android	March 2019	selected regions only	
Samsung	Galaxy A60	Android	June 2019	all versions	
Samsung	Galaxy A70	Android	April 2019	selected regions only	
Samsung	Galaxy A80	Android	May 2019	all versions	
Samsung	Galaxy Ace 2	Android	May 2012	i8160 version	
Samsung	Galaxy Ace 3	Android	July 2013	S7275 version only	NXP PN547
Samsung	Galaxy Ace 4 LTE	Android	August 2014	G310HN, G313F, & G357FZ (Ace Style) versions only	
Samsung	Galaxy Alpha	Android	September 2014	all versions	
Samsung	Galaxy Avant	Android	July 2014	all versions	
Samsung	Galaxy Axiom	Android	November 2012	R830	
Samsung	Galaxy Camera 2	Android	March 2014	all versions	
Samsung	Galaxy C5	Android	June 2016	all versions	
Samsung	Galaxy C5 Pro	Android	March 2017	all versions	
Samsung	Galaxy C7	Android	June 2016	all versions	
Samsung	Galaxy C7 Pro	Android	February 2017	all versions	
Samsung	Galaxy C9 Pro	Android	November 2016	all versions	
Samsung	Galaxy Core Advance	Android	May 2014	all versions	
Samsung	Galaxy Core LTE	Android	May 2014	G386F, G386W, G386V (Lite LTE) versions only	
Samsung	Galaxy Core Plus	Android	October 2013	all versions	
Samsung	Galaxy Core Prime	Android	November 2014	G360F, G360G and G360T versions only	
Samsung	Galaxy E7	Android	November 2016	E7000, E700F versions only	
Samsung	Galaxy Express	Android	March 2013	i437	
Samsung	Galaxy Express 2	Android	October 2013	all versions	
Samsung	Galaxy Fame	Android	March 2013	S6810P version only	
Samsung	Galaxy Fold	Android	July 2019	all versions	
Samsung	Galaxy Golden	Android	November 2013	I9230 version only	
Samsung	Galaxy Grand Prime	Android	October 2014	G530F, G530FZ versions only	
Samsung	Galaxy J	Android	December 2013	selected versions	
Samsung	Galaxy J1 4G	Android	March 2015	selected versions	
Samsung	Galaxy J2	Android	September 2015	selected versions	
Samsung	Galaxy J3 (2016)	Android	January 2016	J320FN version only	
Samsung	Galaxy J3 (2017)	Android	July 2017	optional	
Samsung	Galaxy J3 Pro	Android	June 2016	all versions	
Samsung	Galaxy J4+	Android	October 2018	J415 (market dependent)	
Samsung	Galaxy J5	Android	June 2015	J500FN, J500Y versions only	
Samsung	Galaxy J5 (2016)	Android	April 2016	all versions	
Samsung	Galaxy J5 (2017)	Android	June 2017	all versions	
Samsung	Galaxy J6+ (2018)	Android	October 2018	all versions	
Samsung	Galaxy J7 (2015)	Android	June 2015	J700P, J700T versions only	
Samsung	Galaxy J7 (2016)	Android	April 2016	all versions	NXP PN544 / Broadcom BCM20794
Samsung	Galaxy J7 (2017)	Android	July 2017	all versions	
Samsung	Galaxy J7 (2018)	Android	July 2018	selected versions only	
Samsung	Galaxy J7 Pro	Android	July 2017	all versions	
Samsung	Galaxy K Zoom	Android	June 2014	all versions	
Samsung	Galaxy Light	Android	October 2013	SGH-T399	
Samsung	Galaxy Mega 2	Android	September 2014	all versions	
Samsung	Galaxy Mega 6.3	Android	June 2013	all versions	
Samsung	Galaxy Mini 2	Android	March 2012	GT-S6500	NXP PN544 (NXP 44501)
Samsung	Galaxy Nexus	Android	October 2011	all versions	NXP PN544
Samsung	Galaxy Note	Android	October 2011	selected versions	
Samsung	Galaxy Note II	Android	September 2012	all versions	NXP PN544
Samsung	Galaxy Note 3	Android	October 2013	all versions	NXP PN544 / Broadcom BCM20794
Samsung	Galaxy Note 3 Neo	Android	February 2014	all versions	
Samsung	Galaxy Note 4	Android	October 2014	all versions	Samsung S3FWRN5
Samsung	Galaxy Note 5	Android	August 2015	all versions	Samsung N5DDSS1
Samsung	Galaxy Note 7	Android	September 2016	all versions	
Samsung	Galaxy Note 8	Android	September 2017	all versions	
Samsung	Galaxy Note 9	Android	August 2018	all versions	NXP 80T17
Samsung	Galaxy Note Edge	Android	November 2014	all versions	Samsung S3FWRN5
Samsung	Galaxy Note FE	Android	July 2017	all versions	
Samsung	Galaxy On8	Android	October 2016	all versions	
Samsung	Galaxy Pop	Android	February 2013	SHV-E220	
Samsung	Galaxy Premier	Android	October 2013	i9260	
Samsung	Galaxy Round	Android	October 2013	all versions	
Samsung	Galaxy Rugby Pro	Android	October 2012	i547	
Samsung	Galaxy S Advance	Android	April 2012	selected versions	
Samsung	Galaxy S Blaze 4G	Android	March 2012	selected versions	
Samsung	Galaxy S Light Luxury	Android	May 2018	all versions	
Samsung	Galaxy S II	Android	May 2011	S II Epic 4G Touch D710, E120S, S II Skyrocket i727, S II Skyrocket HD i757, S II i777, S II LTE i727R, I9100G, I9100P, S II LTE i9210, SII T989, S II X T989D versions only	NXP PN544 (NXP 44501)
Samsung	Galaxy S II Plus	Android	February 2013	I9105P version only	
Samsung	Galaxy S III	Android	May 2012	i535, i747, i9300, i9305, L710, T999	NXP PN544
Samsung	Galaxy S III Mini	Android	October 2012	GT-I8190N, GT-I8200N, SM-G730A (US AT&T)	
Samsung	Galaxy S III Neo	Android	April 2014	GT-I9300i versions only	NXP PN547
Samsung	Galaxy S Relay 4G	Android	September 2012	selected versions	
Samsung	Galaxy S4	Android	April 2013	all versions	Broadcom BCM20794
Samsung	Galaxy S4 Active	Android	June 2013	all versions	Broadcom BCM20794
Samsung	Galaxy S4 Mini	Android	July 2013	GT-I9195, GT-I9195i and all US versions	
Samsung	Galaxy S4 Zoom	Android	July 2013	all versions	Broadcom BCM20794
Samsung	Galaxy S5	Android	April 2014	all versions	NXP PN547
Samsung	Galaxy S5 Active and S5 Sport	Android	May 2014	all versions	
Samsung	Galaxy S5 Mini	Android	July 2014	G800F, G800R4, G800Y versions only	
Samsung	Galaxy S5 Neo	Android	August 2015	all versions	NXP PN547
Samsung	Galaxy S5 Plus	Android	November 2014	G901F	
Samsung	Galaxy S6, S6 Edge and S6 Edge+	Android	April and August 2015	all versions	Samsung S3FWRN5P NFC
Samsung	Galaxy S6 Active	Android	June 2015	all versions	
Samsung	Galaxy S7 and S7 Edge	Android	March 2016	all versions, including Galaxy S7 Active	NXP 67T05 and Samsung 81DGXS1 NFC
Samsung	Galaxy S8 and S8+	Android	April 2017	all versions, including S8 Active	
Samsung	Galaxy S9 and S9+	Android	April 2018	all versions	NXP PN80T and Samsung S3NRN82
Samsung	Galaxy S10	Android	March 2019	all versions	
Samsung	Galaxy S10+	Android	March 2019	all versions	
Samsung	Galaxy S10e	Android	March 2019	all versions	
Samsung	Galaxy Stratosphere II	Android	October 2013	i415	
Samsung	Galaxy Trend	Android	October 2013	S7560	
Samsung	Galaxy Victory 4G LTE	Android	September 2014	L300	
Samsung	Galaxy W	Android	September 2014	all versions	
Samsung	Galaxy Young	Android	Q2 2013	S6310N version only	
Samsung	Galaxy Xcover 3	Android	April 2015	G388F, G389F	
Samsung	Galaxy Xcover 4	Android	April 2017	G390F	
Samsung	Wave 538	Bada	November 2011	selected versions	
Samsung	Wave 578	Bada	July 2011	selected versions	
Samsung	Wave 725	Bada	December 2011	selected versions	
Samsung	Z	Tizen	Q3 2014	selected versions	
Sharp	Aquos Crystal 2	Android	July 2015	all versions	
Sharp	Aquos S2	Android	August 2017	all versions	
Sharp	Aquos Xx	Android	July 2015	all versions	
Sonim	XP7	Android	April 2015	all versions	
Sonim	XP8	Android	April 2018	all versions	
Sony	Xperia 1	Android	June 2019	all versions	
Sony	Xperia 10 / Xperia 10 Plus	Android	February 2019	all versions	
Sony	Xperia acro S	Android	August 2012	all versions	NXP PN65N
Sony	Xperia ion	Android	June 2012	all versions	NXP PN65N
Sony	Xperia sola	Android	May 2012	all versions	NXP PN65N
Sony	Xperia C3	Android	August 2014	all versions, including dual SIM variant	
Sony	Xperia C4	Android	June 2015	all versions, including dual SIM variant	
Sony	Xperia C5 Ultra	Android	August 2015	all versions, including dual SIM variant	
Sony	Xperia E3	Android	September 2014	all versions, including dual SIM variant	
Sony	Xperia E4g	Android	April 2015	E2003	
Sony	Xperia E5	Android	June 2016	all versions	
Sony	Xperia L	Android	May 2013	all versions	
Sony	Xperia L1	Android	June 2017	all versions, including dual SIM variant	
Sony	Xperia L2	Android	January 2018	all versions	
Sony	Xperia L3	Android	February 2019	all versions	
Sony	Xperia M	Android	August 2013	all versions	
Sony	Xperia M2	Android	April 2014	all versions, including dual SIM variant	
Sony	Xperia M2 Aqua	Android	September 2014	all versions	
Sony	Xperia M4 Aqua	Android	June 2015	all versions, including dual SIM variant	
Sony	Xperia M5	Android	September 2015	all versions, including dual SIM variant	
Sony	Xperia P	Android	May 2012	all versions	NXP PN65N
Sony	Xperia S	Android	1 March 2012	all versions	NXP PN65N
Sony	Xperia SL	Android	September 2012	all versions	
Sony	Xperia SP	Android	April 2013	all versions	
Sony	Xperia T	Android	September 2012	all versions (including variants such as TL)	NXP PN65N
Sony	Xperia T2 Ultra	Android	March 2014	all versions, including dual SIM variant	
Sony	Xperia T3	Android	July 2013	all versions	
Sony	Xperia TX	Android	October 2012	all versions	NXP PN65N
Sony	Xperia V	Android	December 2012	all versions	NXP PN65N
Sony	Xperia X	Android	May 2016	all versions, including dual SIM variant	
Sony	Xperia X Compact	Android	September 2016	all versions	
Sony	Xperia X Performance	Android	June 2016	all versions, including dual SIM variant	
Sony	Xperia XA	Android	June 2016	all versions, including dual SIM variant	
Sony	Xperia XA Ultra	Android	July 2016	all versions	
Sony	Xperia XA1	Android	April 2017	all versions, including dual SIM variant	
Sony	Xperia XA1 Plus	Android	October 2017	all versions, including dual SIM variant	
Sony	Xperia XA1 Ultra	Android	May 2017	all versions, including dual SIM variant	
Sony	Xperia XA2	Android	February 2018	all versions, including dual SIM variant	
Sony	Xperia XA2 Plus	Android	September 2018	all versions	
Sony	Xperia XA2 Ultra	Android	February 2018	all versions, including dual SIM variant	
Sony	Xperia XZ	Android	October 2016	all versions, including dual SIM variant	
Sony	Xperia XZs	Android	April 2017	all versions, including dual SIM variant	
Sony	Xperia XZ Premium	Android	June 2017	all versions, including dual SIM variant	
Sony	Xperia XZ1	Android	September 2017	all versions, including dual SIM variant	
Sony	Xperia XZ1 Compact	Android	October 2017	all versions	
Sony	Xperia XZ2	Android	April 2018	all versions	
Sony	Xperia XZ2 Compact	Android	April 2018	all versions	
Sony	Xperia XZ2 Premium	Android	July 2018	all versions	
Sony	Xperia XZ3	Android	October 2018	all versions	
Sony	Xperia XZs	Android	April 2017	all versions, including dual SIM variant	
Sony	Xperia Z	Android	February 2013	all versions	NXP PN65N
Sony	Xperia Z Ultra	Android	July 2013	all versions	
Sony	Xperia Z1	Android	September 2013	all versions	NXP PN65N
Sony	Xperia Z1 Compact	Android	January 2014	all versions	
Sony	Xperia Z2	Android	Q2 2014	all versions	
Sony	Xperia Z3	Android	September 2014	all versions, including dual SIM variant and Z3v	
Sony	Xperia Z3 Compact	Android	September 2014	all versions	
Sony	Xperia Z3+/Z4	Android	June 2015	all versions, including dual SIM variant	
Sony	Xperia Z5	Android	October 2015	all versions, including dual SIM variant	
Sony	Xperia Z5 Compact	Android	October 2015	all versions	
Sony	Xperia Z5 Premium	Android	November 2015	all versions, including dual SIM variant	
Sony	Xperia ZL	Android	March 2013	all versions	
Sony	Xperia ZR	Android	June 2013	all versions	
Turkcell	Turkcell T11	Android		all versions	
Turkcell	Turkcell T20	Android		all versions	
Turkcell	Turkcell MaxiPlus5	Android		all versions	
Turkcell	Turkcell MaxiPro5	Android		all versions	
Turkcell	Turkcell T40	Android		all versions	
Vertu	Aster	Android	December 2014	all versions	
Vertu	Constellation	Android	October 2014	RM-851V	
Vertu	Signature Touch	Android	June 2014	RM-980V, RM-980C	
Vertu	Signature Touch (2015)	Android	October 2015	all versions	
vivo	iQOO	Android	March 2019	all versions	
vivo	X27 / X27 Pro	Android	April 2019	selected regions only	
vivo	Xplay5 / Xplay5 Elite	Android	March 2016	all versions	
vivo	Xplay6	Android	December 2016	all versions	
vivo	V15 Pro	Android	March 2019	selected regions only	
Vodafone	Smart III NFC	Android	June 2013	Vodafone 975N	NXP PN544
Vodafone	Smart 4	Android	May 2014	optional	
Vodafone	Smart 4 max	Android	January 2015	all versions	
Vodafone	Smart 4 power	Android	June 2014	all versions	
Vodafone	Smart 4 turbo	Android	Q2 2014	all versions	
Vodafone	Smart 4G	Android	October 2014	optional	
Vodafone	Smart E8	Android	July 2017	all versions	
Vodafone	Smart N8	Android	June 2017	all versions	
Vodafone	Smart Platinum 7	Android	June 2016	all versions	
Vodafone	Smart prime 7	Android	May 2016	all versions	
Vodafone	Smart V8	Android	June 2017	all versions	
Xiaomi	Mi 2A	Android	9 April 2013	all versions	NXP PN544
Xiaomi	Mi 3 TD-SDCMA	Android	5 September 2013	all versions	Broadcom BCM43341
Xiaomi	Mi 3 WCDMA/CDMA2000	Android	5 September 2013	all versions	Broadcom BCM20793
Xiaomi	Mi 4A	Android	7 November 2015	all versions	
Xiaomi	Mi 5	Android	April 2016	all versions	NXP PN66T 66T17
Xiaomi	Mi 5s	Android	October 2016	all versions	NXP PN66T 66T19
Xiaomi	Mi 5s Plus	Android	October 2016	all versions	
Xiaomi	Mi 6	Android	April 2017	all versions	NXP PN80T 80T19
Xiaomi	Mi 8	Android	June 2018	all versions	
Xiaomi	Mi 8 Explorer	Android	July 2018	all versions	
Xiaomi	Mi 8 Pro	Android	September 2018	all versions	
Xiaomi	Mi 9	Android	March 2019	all versions	
Xiaomi	Mi 9 SE	Android	March 2019	all versions	
Xiaomi	Mi 9 Pro	Android	September 2019	all versions	
Xiaomi	Mi 10	Android	February 2020	all versions	
Xiaomi	Mi 10 Pro	Android	February 2020	all versions	
Xiaomi	Mi 10 Lite 5G	Android	March 2020	all versions	
Xiaomi	Mi 10 Lite Zoom	Android	May 2020	all versions	
Xiaomi	Mi 10 Ultra	Android	August 2020	all versions	
Xiaomi	Mi 10S	Android	March 2021	all versions	
Xiaomi	Mi 11	Android	January 2021	all versions	
Xiaomi	Mi 11 Lite 5G	Android	March 2021	M2101K9AG	
Xiaomi	Mi 11 Lite 5G	Android	April 2021	all versions	
Xiaomi	Mi 11 Pro	Android	April 2021	all versions	
Xiaomi	Mi 11 Ultra	Android	April 2021	all versions	
Xiaomi	Mi 11i	Android	April 2021	all versions	
Xiaomi	11 Lite 5G NE	Android	October 2021	2107119DC, 2109119DG	
Xiaomi	12X	Android	December 2021	all versions	
Xiaomi	12	Android	December 2021	all versions	
Xiaomi	12 Pro	Android	December 2021	all versions, including the Dimensity version	
Xiaomi	12S	Android	July 2021	all versions	
Xiaomi	12S Pro	Android	July 2021	all versions	
Xiaomi	12S Ultra	Android	July 2021	all versions	
Xiaomi	12 Lite	Android	July 2021	all versions	
Xiaomi	13	Android	December 2023	all versions	
Xiaomi	13 Pro	Android	December 2023	all versions	
Xiaomi	13 Lite	Android	February 2023	all versions	
Xiaomi	13 Ultra	Android	April 2023	all versions	
Xiaomi	14	Android	November 2023	all versions	
Xiaomi	14 Pro	Android	November 2023	all versions	
Xiaomi	14 Ultra	Android	February 2024	all versions	
Xiaomi	14 Civi	Android	June 2024	all versions	
Xiaomi	15	Android	October 2024	all versions	
Xiaomi	15 Pro	Android	October 2024	all versions	
Xiaomi	15 Ultra	Android	February 2025	all versions	
Xiaomi	15S Pro	Android	May 2025	all versions	
Xiaomi	Mi 9T	Android	June 2019	all versions	
Xiaomi	Mi 9T Pro	Android	August 2019	all versions	
Xiaomi	Mi 10T	Android	October 2020	all versions	
Xiaomi	Mi 10T Pro	Android	October 2020	all versions	
Xiaomi	Mi 10T Lite	Android	October 2020	all versions	
Xiaomi	11T	Android	October 2021	all versions	
Xiaomi	11T Pro	Android	October 2021	all versions	
Xiaomi	12T	Android	October 2022	all versions	
Xiaomi	12T Pro	Android	October 2022	all versions	
Xiaomi	13T	Android	September 2023	all versions	
Xiaomi	13T Pro	Android	September 2023	all versions	
Xiaomi	14T	Android	September 2024	all versions	
Xiaomi	14T Pro	Android	September 2024	all versions	
Xiaomi	Mi CC9	Android	July 2019	all versions	
Xiaomi	Mi CC9 Pro	Android	November 2019	all versions	
Xiaomi	Mi MIX	Android	November 2016	all versions	
Xiaomi	Mi MIX 2	Android	September 2017	all versions	
Xiaomi	Mi MIX 2S	Android	April 2018	all versions	
Xiaomi	Mi MIX 3	Android	November 2018	all versions, including the 5G version	
Xiaomi	MIX 4	Android	August 2021	all versions	
Xiaomi	Mi Note 2	Android	November 2016	all versions	
Xiaomi	Mi Note 3	Android	September 2017	all versions	
Xiaomi	Mi Note 10 / 10 Pro	Android	November 2019	all versions	
Xiaomi	Mi Note 10 Lite	Android	May 2020	all versions	
Xiaomi	Redmi 9	Android	June 2020	M2004J19AG	
Xiaomi	Redmi 9C NFC	Android	August 2020	all versions	
Xiaomi	Redmi 9T	Android	January 2021	M2010J19SY, M2010J19ST, M2010J19SR	
Xiaomi	Redmi 10	Android	August 2021	21061119DG	
Xiaomi	Redmi 10 2022	Android	February 2022	22011119UY	
Xiaomi	Redmi 10C	Android	March 2023	220333QNY	
Xiaomi	Redmi 10 5G	Android	September 2022	22041219NY	
Xiaomi	Redmi 12C	Android	January 2023	22126RN91Y	
Xiaomi	Redmi 12	Android	June 2023	23053RN02Y	
Xiaomi	Redmi 12 5G	Android	August 2023	23076RN8DY	
Xiaomi	Redmi 13C	Android	November 2023	23108RN04Y	
Xiaomi	Redmi 13C 5G	Android	December 2023	23124RN87G	
Xiaomi	Redmi 13	Android	June 2024	24040RN64Y	
Xiaomi	Redmi 14C	Android	August 2024	2409BRN2CY	
Xiaomi	Redmi Note 8 Pro	Android	September 2019	M1906G7E, M1906G7G, M1906G7T	
Xiaomi	Redmi Note 8T	Android	November 2019	all versions	
Xiaomi	Redmi Note 9	Android	May 2020	2003J15SG	
Xiaomi	Redmi Note 9 Pro	Android	May 2020	2003J6B2G	
Xiaomi	Redmi Note 9 Pro 5G	Android	December 2020	all versions	
Xiaomi	Redmi Note 9T 5G	Android	January 2021	all versions	
Xiaomi	Redmi Note 10 Pro	Android	March 2021	M2101K6G, M2101K6T, M2101K6R	
Xiaomi	Redmi Note 10S	Android	April 2021	M2101K7BNY	
Xiaomi	Redmi Note 10 5G / 10T	Android	April 2021	M2103K19G	
Xiaomi	Redmi Note 10 Pro 5G	Android	June 2021	all versions	
Xiaomi	Redmi Note 10T (Japan)	Android	April 2022	all versions	
Xiaomi	Redmi Note 11 Pro (China)	Android	November 2021	all versions	
Xiaomi	Redmi Note 11 Pro+	Android	November 2021	all versions	
Xiaomi	Redmi Note 11	Android	February 2022	2201117SY	
Xiaomi	Redmi Note 11S	Android	February 2022	2201117SY	
Xiaomi	Redmi Note 11 Pro	Android	February 2022	2201116TG	
Xiaomi	Redmi Note 11 Pro 5G / 11E Pro	Android	February 2022	all versions	
Xiaomi	Redmi Note 11S 5G	Android	April 2022	all versions	
Xiaomi	Redmi Note 11T Pro	Android	May 2022	all versions	
Xiaomi	Redmi Note 11T Pro+	Android	May 2022	all versions	
Xiaomi	Redmi Note 12 5G	Android	November 2022	22111317G	
Xiaomi	Redmi Note 12 Pro 5G	Android	November 2022	22101316C, 22101316G	
Xiaomi	Redmi Note 12 Pro+	Android	November 2022	22101316UG, 22101316UCP	
Xiaomi	Redmi Note 12 Discovery	Android	November 2022	all versions	
Xiaomi	Redmi Note 12 Pro Speed	Android	December 2022	all versions	
Xiaomi	Redmi Note 12	Android	March 2023	23021RAA2Y	
Xiaomi	Redmi Note 12 Turbo	Android	March 2023	all versions	
Xiaomi	Redmi Note 12 Pro	Android	April 2023	all versions	
Xiaomi	Redmi Note 12S	Android	April 2023	23030RC7Y	
Xiaomi	Redmi Note 12T Pro	Android	June 2023	all versions	
Xiaomi	Redmi Note 13 5G	Android	September 2023	2312DRAABG	
Xiaomi	Redmi Note 13 Pro 5G	Android	September 2023	2312CRAD3C, 2312DRA50C, 2312DRA50G, XIG05	
Xiaomi	Redmi Note 13 Pro+	Android	September 2023	23090RA98C, 23090RA98G, 24040RA98R	
Xiaomi	Redmi Note 13	Android	January 2024	23124RA7EO	
Xiaomi	Redmi Note 13 Pro	Android	January 2024	all versions	
Xiaomi	Redmi Note 14 5G	Android	September 2024	24094RAD4G	
Xiaomi	Redmi Note 14 Pro 5G	Android	September 2024	24090RA29C, 24090RA29G	
Xiaomi	Redmi Note 14 Pro+	Android	September 2024	24115RA8EC, 24115RA8EG	
Xiaomi	Redmi Note 14	Android	January 2025	24117RN76O	
Xiaomi	Redmi Note 14 Pro	Android	January 2025	all versions	
Xiaomi	Redmi Note 14S	Android	March 202	all versions	
Xiaomi	Redmi Note 10 JE	Android	August 2021	all versions	
Xiaomi	Redmi K20	Android	June 2019	M1903F10A, M1903F10C, M1903F10T	
Xiaomi	Redmi K20 Pro	Android	June 2019	M1903F11C, M1903F11T	
Xiaomi	Redmi K20 Pro Premium	Android	September 2019	all versions	
Xiaomi	Redmi K30	Android	December 2019	all versions, including the 5G and 5G Speed versions	
Xiaomi	Redmi K30 Pro	Android	March 2020	all versions, including the Zoom version	
Xiaomi	Redmi K30i	Android	May 2020	all versions	
Xiaomi	Redmi K30 Ultra	Android	August 2020	all versions	
Xiaomi	Redmi K30S Ultra	Android	November 2020	all versions	
Xiaomi	Redmi K40	Android	March 2021	all versions	
Xiaomi	Redmi K40 Pro	Android	March 2021	all versions	
Xiaomi	Redmi K40 Pro+	Android	March 2021	all versions	
Xiaomi	Redmi K40 Gaming	Android	April 2021	all versions	
Xiaomi	Redmi K40S	Android	March 2022	all versions	
Xiaomi	Redmi K50G	Android	February 2022	all versions	
Xiaomi	Redmi K50	Android	March 2022	all versions	
Xiaomi	Redmi K50 Pro	Android	March 2022	all versions	
Xiaomi	Redmi K50 Ultra	Android	August 2022	all versions	
Xiaomi	Redmi K60E	Android	December 2022	all versions	
Xiaomi	Redmi K60	Android	January 2023	all versions	
Xiaomi	Redmi K60 Pro	Android	January 2023	all versions	
Xiaomi	Redmi K60 Ultra	Android	August 2023	all versions	
Xiaomi	Redmi K70	Android	November 2023	all versions	
Xiaomi	Redmi K70 Pro	Android	November 2023	all versions	
Xiaomi	Redmi K70E	Android	November 2023	all versions	
Xiaomi	Redmi K70 Ultra	Android	July 2024	all versions	
Xiaomi	Redmi K80	Android	November 2024	all versions	
Xiaomi	Redmi K80 Pro	Android	November 2024	all versions	
Xiaomi	Redmi Turbo 3	Android	April 2024	all versions	
Xiaomi	Redmi Turbo 4	Android	January 2025	all versions	
Xiaomi	Redmi Turbo 4 Pro	Android	April 2025	all versions	
Yota	YotaPhone 2	Android	December 2014	all versions	
Yota	YotaPhone 3	Android	September 2017	all versions	
ZTE	Axon	Android	October 2015	all versions	
ZTE	Axon 2 / Axon 7	Android	June 2016	all versions	
ZTE	Axon 7 Mini	Android	October 2016	all versions	
ZTE	Axon 7s	Android	June 2017	all versions	
ZTE	Axon 9 Pro	Android	November 2018	all versions	
ZTE	Axon 10 Pro	Android	May 2019	all versions, including the 5G version	
ZTE	Axon Elite	Android	September 2015	all versions	
ZTE	Axon Lux	Android	November 2015	all versions	
ZTE	Axon Pro	Android	August 2015	all versions	
ZTE	Blade II	Android	March 2012	V880+	
ZTE	Blade D6 / V6 / X7	Android	August 2015	all versions	
ZTE	Blade G	Android	April 2013	V880G	
ZTE	Blade V8 Pro	Android	February 2017	all versions	
ZTE	Blade V9	Android	August 2018	64 GB model only	
ZTE	Blade V9 Vita	Android	August 2018	Russian region only	
ZTE	Blade V10	Android	March 2019	selected regions only	
ZTE	Blade V10	Android	March 2019	64 GB/3 GB RAM version only	
ZTE	Flash	Android	November 2012	all versions	
ZTE	Grand S	Android	March 2013	all versions	
ZTE	Grand S Pro	Android	June 2014	N9835	
ZTE	Grand X IN	Android	September 2012	all versions	
ZTE	Grand X Quad	Android	July 2013	v987	
ZTE	Kis	Android	July 2012	V788	
ZTE	Nubia X6	Android	April 2014	all versions	
ZTE	Nubia Z5	Android	December 2012	all versions	
ZTE	Nubia Z5S	Android	December 2013	all versions	
ZTE	Nubia Z7 / Z7 Max	Android	July 2014	all versions	
ZTE	Nubia Z9	Android	June 2015	all versions	
ZTE	Nubia Z9 Max	Android	April 2015	all versions	
ZTE	Nubia Z11	Android	July 2016	all versions	
ZTE	Axon Z11 mini S	Android	October 2016	all versions	
ZTE	Nubia Z12 mini/Z17 mini	Android	April 2017	all versions	
ZTE	Nubia Z17	Android	June 2017	all versions	
ZTE	Nubia Z17 Lite	Android	September 2017	all versions	
ZTE	Nubia Z17 Mini S	Android	October 2017	all versions	
ZTE	Nubia Z17s	Android	October 2017	all versions	
ZTE	Orbit	Windows Phone	September 2012	all versions	
ZTE	PF200	Android	Q4 2012	all versions	
ZTE	Racer II	Android	September 2011	optional	
ZTE	Vital	Android	June 2013	N9810	
ZTE	Warp 4G	Android	September 2013	all versions	

== Tablet computers ==
Brand	Name	Platform	Release date	Availability	NFC controller
Acer	Iconia Tab 10 A3-A30	Android	2015 - June	all versions	
Acer	Iconia W510	Windows 8	2012 - November	all versions	
Alcatel	Hero 8	Android	2014 - December	all versions	
Asus	Memo Pad	Android	2014 - November	ME572C, ME572CL, ME581CL	
Asus	VivoTab	Windows 8 & RT	2012 - October	all versions	
Google	Nexus 7 (2012)	Android	2012 - July	all versions	NXP PN65
Google	Nexus 7 (2013)	Android	2013 - July	all versions	Broadcom BCM20793
Google	Nexus 9	Android	2014 - November	all versions	
Google	Nexus 10	Android	2012 - November	all versions	Broadcom BCM20793
Hisense	Sero 7	Android	2013 - May	Pro	
HP	Pro Slate 8	Android	2015 - January	all versions	
HP	Pro Slate 12	Android	2015 - January	all versions	
Lenovo	Tab3 10	Android	2016 - June	all versions	
LG	G Pad 10.1	Android	2014 - July	V700n, VK700	
LG	G Pad II 10.1	Android	2015 - September	all versions	
Nokia	Lumia 2520	Windows 8.1 RT	2013 - November	all versions	NXP PN547
Samsung	Ativ Tab	Windows RT	2012 - November	P8510	
Samsung	Galaxy Tab Active	Android	2014 - December	all versions	NXP PN544
Samsung	Galaxy Tab Active 2	Android	2017 - November	all versions	
Sony	VAIO Tap 20	Windows 8	2012 - November	all versions	
Sony	Xperia Tablet Z	Android	2013 - May	all versions	
Sony	Xperia Z2 Tablet	Android	2014 - March	all versions	
Sony	Xperia Z3 Tablet Compact	Android	2014 - November	all versions	
Sony	Xperia Z4 Tablet	Android	2015 - June	all versions	
Vodafone	Smart Tab N8	Android	2017 - June	all versions	

== Smartwatches ==
=== Apple Watch ===
All Apple Watch versions, including from the original launched in 2015, are NFC-capable and support Apple Pay.

=== List of NFC-enabled Wear OS devices ===
Some Wear OS smartwatches have NFC capabilities for contactless payments via Google Pay or Samsung Pay.

Brand	Device name	Android version	Release date	NFC controller
Diesel	On Axial	9 (H)	2019 - September	
Diesel	On Fadelite	9 (H)	2020 - March	
Diesel	On Full Guard 2.5	9 (H)	2018 - October	
Emporio Armani	Connected (2018) - 43mm	9 (H)	2018 - July	
Emporio Armani	Connected (2018) - 46mm	9 (H)	2018 - November	
Emporio Armani	Connected (2019)	9 (H)	2019 - February	
Emporio Armani	Smartwatcht 3	9 (H)	2019 - September	
Fossil	Q Explorist HR	9 (H)	2018 - August	
Fossil	Q Sloan	9 (H)	2019 - August	
Fossil	Q Venture HR	9 (H)	2018 - August	
Fossil	Sport 41mm	9 (H MR1)	2018 - November	
Fossil	Sport 43mm	9 (H MR1)	2018 - November	
Fossil	Q Julianna HR	9 (H)	2019 - August	
Fossil	Q The Carlyle HR	9 (H)	2019 - August	
Fossil	Q Garrett	9 (H)	2020 - January	
Google	Pixel Watch	11	2022 - October	
Google	Pixel Watch 2	13	2023 - October	
Huawei	Watch 2	8	2017 - March	NXP PN548
Huawei	Watch 2 2018	8	2018 - May	NXP PN548
Huawei	Watch 2 4G/LTE	8	2017 - March	NXP PN548
Huawei	Watch 2 Classic	8	2017 - May	NXP PN548
Hublot	Big Bang Referee 2018 FIFA World Cup Russia	8	2018	
Kate Spade NY	Scallop 2	9 (H)	2019 - January	
Kate Spade NY	Sport	9 (H)	2019 - October	
LG	Urbane 2nd Edition	7.1.1	2015 - November	Broadcom BCM2079X
LG	Watch Sport	8	2017 - February	NXP PN548
Louis Vuitton	Tambour Horizon 2019	8	2019 - January	
Michael Kors	Access Bradshaw 2	9 (H)	2019 - September	
Michael Kors	Access Lexington 2	9 (H)	2019 - September	
Michael Kors	Access Runway	9 (H)	2018 - August	
Michael Kors	Access MKGO	9 (H)	2019 - September	
Misfit	Vapor 2 (41mm)	9 (H)	2018 - October	
Misfit	Vapor 2 (46mm)	9 (H)	2018 - October	
Misfit	Vapor X	9 (H)	2019 - August	
Mobvoi	Ticwatch C2 - 18mm	9 (H)	2018 - December	
Mobvoi	Ticwatch C2 - 20mm	9 (H)	2018 - December	
Mobvoi	Ticwatch Pro	9 (H)	2018 - July	
Mobvoi	Ticwatch Pro 4G/LTE	9 (H)	2019 - July	
Montblanc	Summit 2	9 (H)	2018 - October	
Motorola	Moto 360 (Gen 3)	9 (H)	Unreleased	
Movado	Connect	9 (H)	2017 - August	
Movado	Connect 2.0 42mm	9 (H)	2019 - September	
Movado	Connect 2.0 40mm	9 (H)	2019 - September	
Puma	PT9100	9 (H)	2019 - September	
Samsung	Galaxy Watch4		2021 - August	
Samsung	Galaxy Watch5		2022 - August	
Samsung	Galaxy Watch6		2023 - August	
Skagen	Falster 2	9 (H)	2018 - September	
Skagen	Falster 3	9 (H)	2020 - January	
Suunto	Suunto 7	9 (H)	2020 - January	
TAG Heuer	Connected Modular 41	9 (H)	2018 - January	
TAG Heuer	Connected Modular 45	9 (H)	2017 - January	
Tory Burch	Gigi	9 (H)	2018 - October	
Verizon	Wear24	9 (H)	2017 - May	NXP PN548
Xiaomi	Mi Watch	9 (H)	2019 - November	

== Video game controllers ==
On 27 January 2012, Nintendo President Satoru Iwata announced in a briefing that the controller of the Wii U home console will have an installable NFC function. By installing this functionality, it will become possible to create cards and figurines that can electronically read and write data via noncontact NFC and to expand the new play format in the video game world. Adoption of this functionality will enable various other possibilities such as using it as a means of making micropayments.

Name	Platform	Release date	Availability	NFC controller
Wii U GamePad	custom	November 2012	All versions	
New Nintendo 3DS	custom	February 2015	All versions, including New Nintendo 3DS XL, and New Nintendo 2DS XL.	
Nintendo Switch Pro Controller	custom	March 2017	All versions	
Joy-Con	Custom	March 2017	All versions	

== See also ==
- List of 3D-enabled mobile phones
- Projector phone
