= Paranoid Android (operating system) =

Custom ROM for Android

- Developer: Paranoid Android Team
- OS family: Android (Linux)
- Working state: Active
- Source model: Open source with proprietary components
- Latest release: Vauxite / 5 February 2025; 19 months ago
- Latest preview: Vauxite / 5 February 2025; 19 months ago
- Repository: github.com/AOSPA
- Marketing target: Firmware replacement for Android mobile devices
- Update method: Over-the-air (OTA), ROM flashing, ADB Sideloading, Fastboot package
- Package manager: APK-based
- Supported platforms: arm, arm64
- Kernel type: Monolithic (Linux)
- Default user interface: Paranoid Launcher
- License: Apache License 2.0 for userspace software; GNU GPL v2 for the Linux kernel modifications
- Official website: paranoidandroid.co

Paranoid Android is an open-source operating system for smartphones and tablet computers, based on the Android mobile platform. The project continues active development, with releases expanding to Android 15 under the Vauxite series.

In September 2015, PC Advisor or Tech Advisor called it one of the most famous ROMs alongside CyanogenMod, while The Economic Times named it the second-largest custom Android ROM globally with over 200 000 users.

== History ==
Paranoid Android was founded by Paul Henschel. According to a Reddit AMA session with the lead developers, the ROM was named after the Radiohead song of the same name.

In February 2015, OnePlus hired a handful of key members from the Paranoid Android team to work on its new OxygenOS. This caused delays to the release of Paranoid Android 5.1 builds.

In October 2015, team member Matt Flaming told Android Authority that the project would go on hold. In June 2016, the Paranoid Android team announced that they were back with new team members. This announcement coincided with the release of a new version of Paranoid Android, which was based on Android 6.0.1 Marshmallow, with the May security patch, and included new customization features. On June 8, 2016, Paranoid Android supported Nexus 6P, Nexus 5X, Nexus 6, Nexus 5, Nexus 4, Nexus 7 2013, Nexus 9, OnePlus One, OnePlus 2, and OnePlus X.

On May 31, 2017, the team announced that they released the Nougat flavour of Paranoid Android. This version was based on Android 7.1.2 Nougat, with the most notable feature being the return of Pie Controls. Supported devices include the OnePlus 3 and 3T, Nexus 5X, Nexus 6P, Pixel, and Pixel XL.

On 12 May. 2018, the Paranoid Android Google+ account posted an update on the status of the project. The developers had run out of funds causing their website and Gerrit to shut down and ceasing all work on Oreo builds. The team stated that they were close to release but weren't able to continue without funds and looked to the community for donations.

On 27 August 2018, the Google+ page was updated with a new post titled "Being more transparent". The team apologized for a lack of communication and shared info about current activities. The team decided to finish device trees and release sources before discontinuing Oreo MR1. Basic builds were released for the OnePlus 3, 3T, 5 and 5T, as well as the Sony Xperia X, X Compact, XZ Premium, XZ1 and XZ2. The next goal was Android Pie, with the post saying builds were almost stable, though at the time of the post only two commits under the Pie branch were released on the team's Gerrit.^{a} They also released concept art for an upcoming feature named "Blink Navigation" based on gestures and Pie navigation, as well as a rundown of a new versioning system.

The project was relaunched with a new set of stable releases named "Quartz" (based on Android 10) on 16 April 2020, for a limited set of devices. The Quartz release coincides with supporting additional devices such as the Xiaomi Mi 9.

== Features ==
According to The Economic Times, the two most notable features of Paranoid Android are the Halo and the Pie. The Halo (not included in version 5.0 or greater) is a floating bubble that lets users see notifications without leaving the current screen, and the Pie is a replacement for onscreen navigation buttons that stays off screen and lets users swipe in from the edge to see the buttons.

Paranoid Android also features Substratum theme support alongside their own Color Engine, accidental touch rejection, Pocket Lock (which prevents buttons being pressed in a user's pocket) and the ability to take a screenshot by swiping three fingers.

== List of supported devices ==
The following is a list of devices that are supported by Paranoid Android:

Manufacturer	Model	Code name	PA version
Asus	ZenFone 9	davinci	Topaz (13)
Google	Pixel 6	oriole	Topaz (13)
Google	Pixel 6 Pro	raven	Topaz (13)
Google	Pixel 6a	bluejay	Topaz (13)
Google	Pixel 7	panther	Topaz (13)
Google	Pixel 7 Pro	cheetah	Topaz (13)
Google	Pixel 7a	lynx	Topaz (13)
Xiaomi	Mi 8	dipper	Sapphire (12)
Xiaomi	Mi 8 Pro	equuleus	Sapphire (12)
Xiaomi	Mi 8 EE	ursa	Sapphire (12)
Xiaomi	Mi 10	umi	Sapphire (12)
Xiaomi	11 Lite NE / Mi 11 LE	lisa	Topaz (13)
Xiaomi	12X	psyche	Uvite (14)
Xiaomi	13	fuxi	Uvite (14)
Xiaomi	13 Pro	nuwa	Uvite (14)
Xiaomi	13 Ultra	ishtar	Uvite (14)
Xiaomi	Mi 10T / Mi 10T Pro	apollo	Uvite (14)
Xiaomi	Mi MIX 2S	polaris	Sapphire (12)
Xiaomi	Mi MIX 3	perseus	Sapphire (12)
Xiaomi	Pocophone F1	beryllium	Topaz (13)
Xiaomi	Poco X3 / X3 NFC	surya	Uvite (14)
Xiaomi	Poco X3 Pro	vayu	Topaz (13)
Xiaomi	Redmi K30 / Poco X2	phoenix	Topaz (13)
Xiaomi	Redmi K30 Pro / K30 Pro Zoom / Poco F2 Pro	lmi	Topaz (13)
Xiaomi	Redmi K40 / Mi 11X / Poco F3	alioth	Uvite (14)
Xiaomi	Redmi K40S / Poco F4	munch	Uvite (14)
Xiaomi	Redmi 7A / 8 / 8A / 8A Dual	mi439	Uvite (14)
Xiaomi	Redmi 7A / 8 / 8A / 8A Dual	mi439_419	Uvite (14)
Xiaomi	Redmi 8	olives	Uvite (14)
Xiaomi	Redmi 9T / Poco M3	juice	Topaz (13)
Xiaomi	Redmi 12 5G / Poco M6 Pro 5G	sky	Uvite (14)
Xiaomi	Redmi Note 9S / Note 9 Pro / Note 9 Pro Max / Note 10 Lite / Poco M2 Pro	miatoll	Uvite (14)
Xiaomi	Redmi Note 10	sunny	Uvite (14)
Xiaomi	Redmi Note 12 Turbo / Poco F5	marble	Uvite (14)
Motorola	Edge 30	dubai	Topaz (13)
OnePlus	5	Oneplus5	Topaz (13)
OnePlus	5T	Oneplus5t	Topaz (13)
OnePlus	6/6T	Oneplus6	Topaz (13)
OnePlus	7 Pro	Oneplus7Pro	Topaz (13)
OnePlus	7T Pro	Oneplus7TPro	Topaz (13)
OnePlus	9/9 Pro	Oneplus9	Topaz (13)
OnePlus	9R	Oneplus9r	Topaz (13)
Nothing	Phone (1)	phone1	Uvite (14)
Nothing	Phone (2)	phone2	Uvite (14)
Qualcomm	QRD SM8350	lahaina	Uvite (14)
Qualcomm	QRD SM72xx	lito	Uvite (14)
Realme	X50 Pro 5G / X50 Pro 5G Play	Bladerunner	Uvite (14)
Realme	GT2	Porsche	Uvite (14)
Realme	GT Neo2	Bitra	Uvite (14)

== See also ==
- List of custom Android firmware

== Notes ==
a.The commits to the Gerrit could previously be found at https://gerrit.aospa.co/#/q/project:AOSPA/android_device_qcom_common+branch:pie+until:2018-08-27, but have since been removed.
