= List of 3D-enabled mobile phones =

This is a list of 3D-enabled mobile phones, which typically use autostereoscopic displays. Some devices may use other kinds of display technology, like holographic displays or multiscopic displays. Some devices also employ eye tracking in aiming the 3D effect toward the viewer's eye.

== List of 3D-enabled mobile phones ==
Model	Release	Availability	Display	3D Camera	3D output via HDMI or USB C
Sharp mova SH251iS	2002-11-16	Japan	Parallax barrier	No	No
Sharp mova SH505i	2003-06-20	Japan	Parallax barrier	No	No
Samsung SCH-B710	2007-07-11	South Korea	Parallax barrier	Yes	No
Hitachi Wooo Ketai H001	2009-02-06	Japan	Cell-matrix parallax barrier	No	No
Samsung AMOLED 3D SCH-W960	2010-05-03	South Korea	Parallax barrier	No	No
Motorola MING MT810	2010-08-30	China	Parallax barrier	No	No
Sharp LYNX SH-03C	2010-12-03	Japan	Striped parallax barrier	No	No
Sharp Galapagos 003SH	2010-12-17	Japan	Striped parallax barrier	No	No
Sharp Galapagos 005SH	2011-02-25	Japan	Striped parallax barrier	No	No
HTC EVO 3D	2011-06-24	Global	Parallax barrier	Yes	Yes
LG Optimus 3D P920 aka LG Thrill 4G	2011-07-07	Global	Parallax barrier	Yes	Yes
Sharp Aquos 006 SH	2011-05-18	Japan	Striped parallax barrier	Yes	Yes
Sharp Aquos SH-12C or SH-80F	2011-05-20	Japan & France	Striped parallax barrier	Yes	Yes
Sharp Aquos SH-01D	2011-12-02	Japan	Striped parallax barrier	No	Yes
Sharp Aquos 102SH	2011-12-16	Japan	Striped parallax barrier	No	Yes
LG Optimus 3D Cube SU870	2012-02-14	South Korea	Parallax barrier	Yes	Yes
ZOPO ZP200 Shining	2012-03-00	China	Parallax barrier	No	No
Sharp Aquos SH-06D	2012-03-23	Japan	Striped parallax barrier	No	Yes
LG Optimus 3D MAX	2012-04-23	Global	Parallax barrier	Yes	Yes
Sharp Aquos 102SHII	2012-07-12	Japan	Striped parallax barrier	No	Yes
ZOPO ZP200+ Royal Shining	2012-10-00	China	Parallax barrier	No	No
Micromax A115 Canvas 3D	2012-04-00	China	Parallax barrier	No	No
ZOPO ZP600 Libero 3D	2012-12-00	China	Parallax barrier	No	No
Konka S1 Mirage	2013-05-04	China	Parallax barrier	No	No
ZOPO INFINITY ZP600+	2014-06	India	Parallax barrier	No	No
3D69	2014-01-22	China	Parallax barrier	No	No
Fire Phone	2014-07-25	United States	Four front-facing cameras to create a 3D perspective	No	No
Macxen S1	2014-09-00	China	Parallax barrier	No	No
GALAZ Noah 3D or GALAZ GAL-N1159 or GALAZ N1 or Noah N1 (4G LTE version)	2014-09-26	China	2560 x 1600 pixel resolution laid upon a LTPS panel made by Japan Display (JDI) with 2560 semicircular prisms, each one being 70 microns in diameter. Proprietary 3D API technology & Eye-tracking	No	Yes
Takee 1	2015-01-06	China	SeeReal Technologies Holographic display based on eye tracking	No	No
Snail W 3D	2015-01-07	China	SuperD Lenticular lens & eye tracking	No	No
mPhone 9Plus	2015-02-00	India	Parallax Barrier	No	No
InFocus M550-3D	2015-07-00	China	SuperD LC lens & eye-tracking	No	Yes
VKWorld Discovery S1	2015-08-00	China	Parallax barrier	No	No
PPTV King 7S	2015-09-00	China	Lenticular screen 2560x1440, column interlaced mode	No	No
Changhong X1 / X1-K	2015-09-16	China	KDX Lenticular screen, column interlaced mode & eye-tracking	No	Yes
VKWorld Discovery S2 or TeknoAVR S2-3D	2015-11-00	China	Parallax barrier	No	No
ZTE N940Sc or ZTE V5 Pro	2015-12-01	China	Parallax barrier	No	No
Focalmax Maxphone T1	2016-01-28	China	Parallax barrier & eye-tracking	No	No
D Color 7.0 V01 or DColor7V01 or DColor7.0V01 (3G calls version)	2016-00-00	China	K3DX Lenticular screen, column interlaced mode & eye-tracking	No	No
Ding Ding C200 and Ding Ding Guide S1	2016-01-05	China and Malaysia	Parallax barrier	No	No
MBI R6	2016-05-31	China	Parallax barrier	No	No
V5 K3DX-V5G	2016-06-16	China	K3DX Lenticular screen, column interlaced mode & eye-tracking	No	No
Cleyyo	2016-07-00	Mauritius	Parallax Barrier	No	Yes
Alienline Alpha 5 and Alpha 5 Pro	2016-08-00	Australia	Lenticular screen	No	No
SuperD D1	2016-09-00	China	SuperD columnar grating liquid crystal screen, which uses the lenticular grating technology & eye-tracking & anti moiré	No	No
ZTE axon 7 max (C2017)(some models)	2016-10-00	China	KDX Parallax barrier, column interlaced mode	Yes	No
DOOGEE Y6 Max 3D	2016-10-00	China	Lenticular screen, column interlaced mode	No	No
(Brand: IDEA Model: ID-S9)	2017-01-00	China	Lenticular screen, column interlaced mode	No	No
ZTE Blade V8	2017-02-00	China	No 3D screen	Yes	No
Ivvi K5	2017-04-19	China	SuperD columnar grating liquid crystal screen, which uses the lenticular grating technology & eye-tracking	No	No
MBI R7	2017-05-00	China	Lenticular screen & eye-tracking ?	No	No
Energy Phone Pro 3	2017-06-00	Spain	No 3D screen	Yes	No
IQH 3D	2017-06-00	Jamaica & USA	Lenticular Film	Yes	No
DMZ DAMUZHI Thumb V3 / V3D	2017-07-17	China	Lenticular screen & eye-tracking	No	No
Unno P8	2017-09-00	China	KDX Lenticular screen	No	No
ARK BENEFIT M551 (SuperD D1)	2017-09-26	China	SuperD LC lens & eye-tracking	No	No
Blackview P2 Lite 3D or Blackview DE3DLite-BL	2017-12-00	China	K3DX Lenticular screen	No	No
Jiashun Digitech (Shanghai) S5	2018-00-00	China	Lenticular screen	No	No
Sooloo ASIL	2018-00-00	China	Lenticular screen	No	No
UNIWA W6036i	2018-00-00	China	Lenticular screen	No	No
Elephone P8 3D / CNOEMS M126	2018-01-00	China	KDX Lenticular screen, column interlaced mode, eye-tracking is disabled	No	No
Konka Phantom T1 / 801	2018-02-07	China	KDX Lenticular screen. Mirage 3D Game version supports Naked Eye 3D. The Standard version does not support Naked Eye 3D.	No	No
SANSO H1/H1Pro	2018-02-12	Global	H/W based Parallax barrier with FHD+ OLED Display	Yes	Yes
Yocophone A9	2018-04-10	CHINA		Yes	No
Kaliho M3 or AIYA3D	2018-04-13	China	Lenticular screen	No	No
Koobee F2 (3D limited edition)	2018-04-26	China	KDX Lenticular screen	No	No
Koobee F2 Plus (with notch)	2018-07	China	KDX Lenticular screen	No	No
Tianjin BlueCool LK7	2018-07-12	China	KDX Lenticular screen	No	No
VEECON ROKiT IO 3D	2018-10-25	India	Lenticular screen	Yes	No
VEECON ROKiT IO Pro 3D	2018-10-25	India	Lenticular screen	Yes	No
Red Hydrogen One	2018-11-00	USA	Holographic 4-View (H4V display). Diffractive Lightfield Backlighting (DLB) by Leia	Yes	Yes
Elephone A4 Pro with naked-eye 3D (optional) / CNOEMS E3007	2018-11-08	Malaysia		Yes	No
Elephone A5 with naked-eye 3D (optional)	2018-11-08	Malaysia		Yes	No
DINGDING X20	2019-03-00	CHINA		Yes	No
Yocophone A11	2019-03-00	CHINA		Yes	No
ROKiT IO 3D	2019-03-20	USA		Yes	No
ROKiT IO PRO 3D	2019-03-20	USA		Yes	No
Elephone P11 3D	2019-04-00	China		No	No
Alienline Jupiter 8 Tablet	2020-01-23	Hungary		Yes	No
Alienline Jupiter 10 Tablet	2020-01-24	Hungary		Yes	No
Alienline Alpha 6 Smartphone	2020-06-09	Hungary		Yes	No
Lume Pad	2020-10-16	USA	2nd generation Holographic 4-View (H4V display). Diffractive Lightfield Backlighting (DLB) by Leia	Yes	Yes
ProMa King	2022-01-07	Spain/China	New lenticular screen designed for larger displays. Tablet that can also work as PC 3D monitor and mobile phone (4G Sim card slot allows to make calls/send SMS & use internet without Wi-Fi needed)	No	Yes
ZTE nubia Pad 3D LitByLeia aka Lume Pad 2	2023-02-28	Global	Advanced 3D lightfield is enabled by a proprietary DLB layer that’s integrated beneath the LCD, enabling 3D viewing. AI face tracking and 8 views vision. Diffractive Lightfield Backlighting (DLB) by Leia	Yes	Yes
Opic's 3D smartphone	2023-05-01	USA	Provides "3D livestream" to VR headsets	Yes	Yes
Xreal Beam Pro	2024-06-22	Global	No 3D, output to AR/VR headsets (Xreal air 2 pro) This device only functions as an internet phone and has no phone network capability.	Yes	Yes

== List of 3D Video Players ==
Video Player	Release	Publisher	Compatibility
3DVideoPlayer (Mik-el)	2019	Mik-el, GitHub	EStar Takee 1

== See also ==
- List of mobile phone games with 3D display support
- Nintendo 3DS
- List of NFC-enabled mobile devices
- Projector phone
- LEIA Inc
