= Redmi K20 =

2019 Android smartphones made by Xiaomi

Redmi K20 Pro Redmi K20
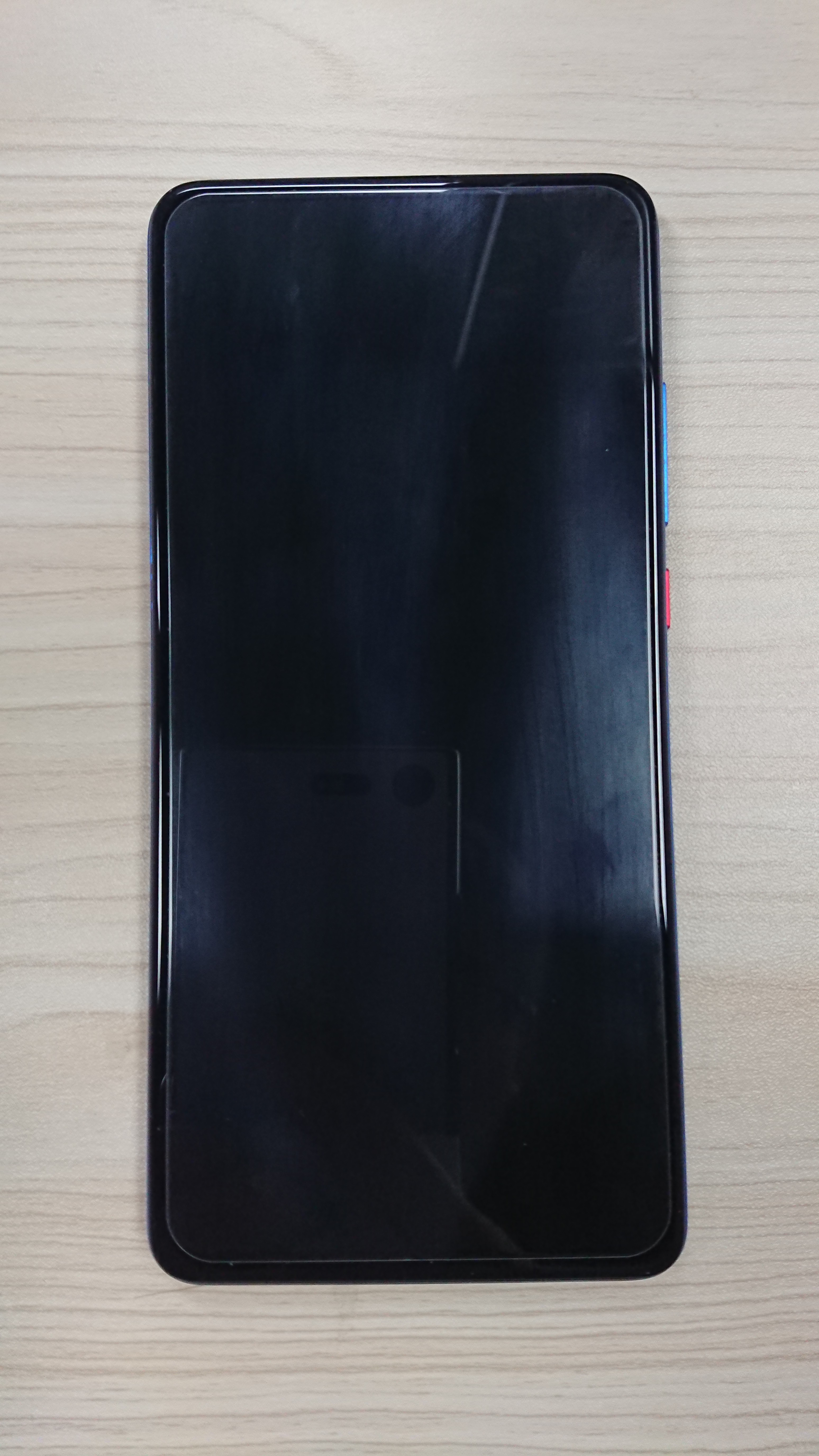
- Manufacturer: Xiaomi
- Type: Touchscreen smartphone
- Series: Redmi
- First released: May 2019; 7 years ago
- Predecessor: Xiaomi Pocophone F1
- Successor: Redmi K30/K30 Pro; Xiaomi Mi 10T/10T Pro
- Form factor: Slate
- Dimensions: H: 156.7 mm (6.17 in); W: 74.3 mm (2.93 in); D: 8.8 mm (0.35 in)
- Weight: 181 g (6.4 oz)
- Operating system: MIUI 10 based on Android 9 Pie; Current: MIUI 12.5 based on Android 11
- System-on-chip: Redmi K20 Pro: Qualcomm SM8150 Snapdragon 855 Redmi K20 Pro Premium: Qualcomm Snapdragon 855+ Redmi K20: Qualcomm SM7150-AA Snapdragon 730
- CPU: Redmi K20 Pro: Octa-core (1 + 3 + 4 cores (1x 2.84 GHz Kryo 485 + 3x 2.42 GHz Kryo 485 + 4x 1.78 GHz Kryo 485)); Redmi K20 Pro Premium: Octa-core (1 + 3 + 4 cores (1x 2.96 GHz Kryo 485 + 3x 2.42 GHz Kryo 485 + 4x 1.78 GHz Kryo 485)); Redmi K20: Octa-core (2 + 6 cores (2x 2.2 GHz Kryo 470 Gold – Cortex A76 derivative + 6x 1.8 GHz Kryo 470 – Kryo 470 Cortex A55 derivative))
- GPU: Redmi K20 Pro: Adreno 640; Redmi K20: Adreno 618
- Memory: 6 or 8 GB; 12 GB (K20 Pro Premium) LPDDR4X RAM
- Storage: 64 GB, 128 GB or 256 GB; 512 GB (K20 Pro Premium)
- Removable storage: None
- Battery: Non-removable Li-Po 4000 mAh battery
- Rear camera: Triple: Sony Exmor RS IMX586 48 MP (f/1.7, (wide), 1/2", 0.8 μm, PDAF) + 13 MP, (f/2.4, (ultrawide)) + 8 MP, f/2.4, (telephoto), PDAF, 2x optical zoom, Dual-LED flash, Geo-tagging, touch focus, face detection, panorama, HDR
- Front camera: Motorized pop-up 20 MP, (f/2.0, 0.9 μm), HDR
- Display: 6.39 inches, 1080 x 2340 pixels, 19.5:9 ratio (403 ppi), AMOLED capacitive touchscreen, 16M colors
- Connectivity: 2G, 3G, 4G, 4G LTE, Wi-Fi 802.11a/b/g/n/ac (2.4 & 5GHz), dual-band, WiFi Direct, DLNA, hotspot Bluetooth V5, A2DP, Low-energy, aptX-HD
- Codename: K20 Pro: raphael K20: davinci

Redmi K20 Pro and Redmi K20 (Xiaomi Mi 9T Pro and Xiaomi Mi 9T globally) are smartphones introduced by the Xiaomi sub-brand Redmi in an event held in China. A Premium variant for the Pro was later revealed, with the Snapdragon 855+, a new 512 GB/12 GB RAM model, a refined cooling system, and an exclusive finish.

== Specifications ==
=== Design ===
Redmi K20 Pro comes with a newer kind of gradient design which resembles a flame.

The Redmi K20 Pro and Redmi K20 (Xiaomi Mi 9T globally) are available in four colors: Glacier Blue, Flame Red, Carbon Black and Pearl White. The Redmi K20 Pro and Redmi K20 both have 6.39" full-screen FHD+ Horizon AMOLED displays,103%NTSC, DCI-P3 and a glass/metal construction.

=== Hardware ===
The Redmi K20 Pro comes with the Qualcomm Snapdragon 855 paired with 6 GB of RAM with 64 or 128 GB internal storage and 8 GB of RAM with 128 GB or 256 GB of non-expandable internal storage. The Redmi K20 is powered by the mid-range Qualcomm Snapdragon 730 and has the same RAM and storage options as the Redmi K20 Pro. The Redmi K20 Pro has 27W fast charging while the Redmi K20 has 18W fast charging; both have 7th generation in-display fingerprint sensors and 4000 mAh batteries.

==== Camera ====
Both smartphones have three rear-facing cameras but K20 Pro has the 48-megapixel Sony Exmor IMX586 as the primary sensor While the K20 has the Sony IMX582, a 13-megapixel ultrawide sensor, and an 8 MP telephoto lens, both with a motorized pop-up 20-megapixel front camera.

The main speciality of the triple 48+8+13 MP back camera is that it comes with a wide, ultrawide and telephoto lens. It can capture scenes from many different perspectives. 2x optical zoom keeps details when the photo is zoomed in or cropped.

=== Software ===
Both smartphones come with MIUI 10 on top of Android Pie. The Redmi K20 Pro Premium Edition ships with MIUI 11 on top of Android 10.
