= Huawei Sonic =

Android smartphone developed by Huawei

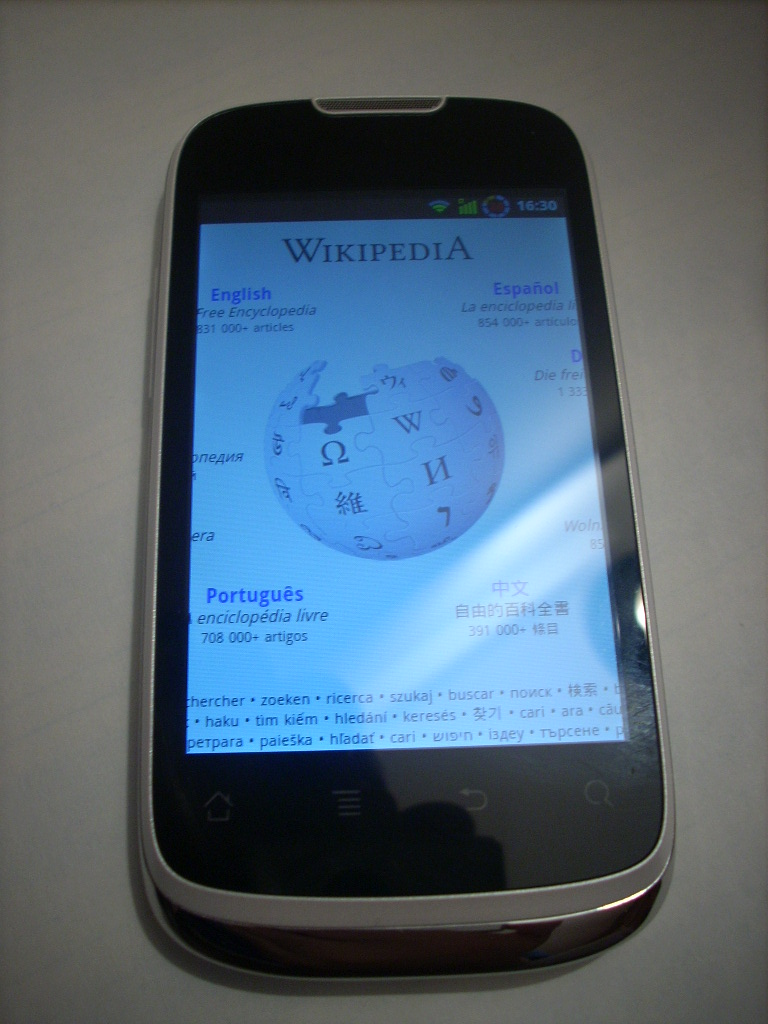
- A Huawei Sonic, with Wikipedia displayed on its screen
- Manufacturer: Huawei
- Type: Smartphone
- First released: June 21, 2011; 15 years ago
- Availability by region: Turkey June 21, 2011 (Unlocked)
- Compatible networks: GSM: 900, 1800, 1900 MHz UMTS:900, 2100 MHz
- Form factor: Candybar
- Dimensions: 4.58 x 2.38 x 0.47 (116.3 x 60.5 x 11.9 mm)
- Weight: 120 g (4 oz)
- Operating system: Android 2.3.3 update available to 2.3.5
- CPU: Single-Core 600MHz Qualcomm MSM7227
- GPU: Adreno 200
- Memory: 256 MB RAM / 512 MB ROM
- Removable storage: MicroSD, up to 32gb
- Battery: 1400 mAh
- Rear camera: 3.2 mpx
- Display: 3.5 inches
- Connectivity: Wi-Fi 802.11 b/g/n, Wi-Fi, Wi-Fi hot spot, Bluetooth v2.1 with A2DP + EDR, NFC (optional), microUSB v2.0
- Data inputs: Multi-touch touch screen, accelerometer, proximity, compass, aGPS and stereo-fm radio

The Huawei Sonic was a low-range smartphone manufactured by Huawei. It runs Android 2.3, has a 3.2mpx camera and access to the Internet. Radio services are also provided, unlike a Nexus, with an FM radio.

== Launch and availability ==
=== Asia/Pacific ===
Country	Release date
Turkey	June 21, 2011
Malaysia	June 29, 2011
China	August, 2011
India	November 18, 2011
Australia	December 1, 2011
New Zealand	January 2012

=== Europe ===
Country	Release date
United Kingdom	August, 2011
Croatia	October, 2011
Germany	December, 2011
Lithuania	(Omnitel) January, 2012
Italy	(Vodafone) January, 2013

=== Americas ===
Country	Release date
USA	July 13, 2011

== Hardware ==
=== Processor ===
The phone runs on a Qualcomm MSM7227 chip at 600MHZ clock speed.

=== Memory ===
The Huawei Sonic has a 256MB of RAM and a 512MB ROM. It has a storage capacity of 160 MB. It also has a MicroSD card slot which can support up to 32 GB of storage. Huawei offers its cloud service online making this the first phone with its cloud service. With Huawei's cloud service, the phone can support up to 16 GB of storage online.

=== Display ===
The Huawei Sonic has a 3.5 inch multi-touch TFT capacitive touchscreen.

=== Audio ===
The phone has a built-in speakerphone which allows for good quality listening to music.

=== Camera ===
On the back of the phone there is a 3.2mpx camera which can also record WVGA (800x480) video recording at 16-22FPS. The camera features geo-tagging but has no support for low-light pictures as it has no flash.

=== Connectivity ===
The Huawei Sonic is the first low-range smartphone of its kind to have an NFC (optional) chip in it in its U8650NFC-1 version. The micro-USB port enables USB Mass Storage mode, meaning pictures, videos and music can be transferred on to the phone from a computer. The phone also features a standard 3.5mm headphone jack which is located at the top of the phone.

== Software ==
The Huawei Sonic runs Android 2.3.3 but is able to be updated to Android 2.3.5 which improves the performance, battery life and many other issues that affected Android 2.3.3.

Android version 4.0.4 is also available by recovery by the user (custom recovery required).

== Reception ==
During the product's release, the Sonic received generally very good reviews, with reviewers praising its large screen and good performance.

Project Gus gave this product a review on 7 August 2011. He gave it a very positive review, citing its snappy performance and large screen compared to phones of the time. He also cited its long battery life and low price.

== Variants ==
=== U8650-1 ===
The Huawei U8650-1 is the Sonic model which doesn't have NFC

=== U8650NFC-1 ===
The Huawei U8650NFC-1 is the same phone except that it also includes a NFC chip inside it making it the first low-range smartphone to include this.

=== U8652 ===
The Huawei Fusion U8652 is the American version of the Sonic sold by AT&T. It has the same specs, with AT&T apps and Android 2.3.4 preinstalled. It can be bought in America prepaid or at Walmart.

=== C8650 ideos ===
The C8650 ideos is basically the same phone as U8650 but the design has been changed slightly and the amount of RAM was doubled - 512MB of RAM.

=== T-Mobile Prism 3G ===
The T-Mobile Prism 3G is another variant manufactured by Huawei for T-Mobile. It features exactly the same specifications as the original, along with T-Mobile proprietary apps and will be released for $50 on a two-year contract on May 6, 2012.
