= Samsung Galaxy S Relay 4G =

2012 smartphone by Samsung Electronics

- Brand: Samsung
- Manufacturer: Samsung Electronics
- Type: Slider smartphone
- Series: Galaxy S
- Family: Samsung Galaxy
- First released: September 19, 2012; 14 years ago
- Availability by region: US
- Related: Samsung Galaxy S III; Samsung Epic 4G
- Compatible networks: 2G GSM/GPRS/EDGE – 850, 900, 1,800, 1,900 MHz; 3G UMTS/HSPA+ – 850, 900, 1,700, 1,900, 2,100 MHz; 4G HSPA+ (Category24, 42 Mbps)
- Form factor: Slider
- Dimensions: 4.96 in × 2.56 in × 0.53 in (125.98 mm × 65.02 mm × 13.46 mm)
- Weight: 5.29 oz (150 g)
- Operating system: Original: Android 4.0.4 "Ice Cream Sandwich"; Current: Android 4.1.2 "Jelly Bean"
- System-on-chip: Qualcomm Snapdragon S4 MSM8260A
- CPU: 1.5 GHz dual-core Krait
- GPU: Adreno 225
- Memory: 1 GB RAM
- Storage: 8 GB flash memory
- Removable storage: microSDHC
- Battery: 1800 mAh
- Rear camera: 5.0 megapixels LED flash HD video (720p); Autofocus
- Front camera: 1.3 megapixels
- Display: 4.0 in (100 mm) diagonal Super AMOLED touchscreen 480x800 pixels (233 ppi)
- Connectivity: 3.5 millimetres (0.14 in) TRRS; Bluetooth 4.0; Wi-Fi (802.11 a/b/g/n); Micro-USB with MHL link NFC; DLNA
- Data inputs: Multi-touch capacitive touchscreen aGPS; GLONASS; Accelerometer
- Model: SGH-T699
- Development status: Discontinued
- Other: Mini-SIM card format
- Website: samsung.com/us/mobile/cell-phones/SGH-T699DABTMB

The Samsung Galaxy S Relay 4G is an Android-based touchscreen slider smartphone manufactured, developed, designed and produced by Samsung Electronics for T-Mobile USA. It resembles the Samsung Epic 4G in appearance and shares the Epic 4G's screen and camera specifications, but the CPU and other internal hardware is more similar to the Galaxy S III.

Newer competitors include the BlackBerry KeyOne and BlackBerry Priv. As well, official and unofficial external keyboards are available for some Samsung Galaxy devices, including the Galaxy Note 5, the Galaxy S6, the Galaxy S7, and some newer phones. Samsung calls its official external keyboard a "keyboard cover".

== History ==
=== Naming ===
The phone's model number assigned by Samsung is SGH-T699. Over the months leading up to the device's launch, various leaks emerged assigning different names to this model: first "Samsung Apex Q," then "Samsung Galaxy S Blaze Q," and finally on August 15, 2012 the name that it would launch with was revealed: "Samsung Galaxy S Relay 4G."

== Hardware ==
=== Physical keyboard ===
Unlike many other Android handsets, the Galaxy S Relay 4G has a five-row physical keyboard.

=== Screen ===
The phone has a 4-inch (480 x 800 pixel) WVGA Super AMOLED touchscreen with a pixel density of 233 ppi. This screen is identical to the one used on the similar-looking Samsung Epic 4G.

The phone's touchscreen controller chip is an Atmel MaxTouch MXT224E.

=== Micro-USB ===
The phone includes a micro-USB port.

Due to limitations in the phone's included firmware, the phone does not support USB On-The-Go. Still, as with other modern Android phones, there are other ways to connect peripherals. For example: Bluetooth keyboards and many Bluetooth mice work with the phone, and a compatible monitor or TV can be connected using a compatible Mobile High-Definition Link cable. Alternatively, it may be possible for the phone's owner to "attach" a personal computer's keyboard, mouse, and monitor using an app such as TeamViewer QuickSupport.

=== Processor and memory ===
The Galaxy S Relay 4G features a 1.5 GHz dual-core Snapdragon S4 processor with an Adreno 225 GPU. Initially it was reported that the phone would have the older S3 chipset, and this was even printed on the box, but Samsung and T-Mobile have both confirmed that it will launch with the newer S4 chipset.

The phone contains 1 GB RAM, 8 GB internal flash storage with approximately 5 GB available to the user, and supports up to a 32 GB MicroSD card.

The Micro SD card slot, after Jelly Bean update, will support a 64 GB Micro SD card.

=== Cameras ===
The rear-facing camera has 5.0-megapixel resolution and includes the following features: 4x Digital Optical Zoom, Auto Focus, Multiple Shot Modes, Timer, Smile Shot, and Camcorder with 720p HD Recording. The front-facing camera has 1.3-megapixel resolution.

=== Battery and power ===
The phone includes an 1800 mAh battery, providing theoretical talk time up to 10 hours, and standby time up to 13 days. It uses a Qualcomm PM8921 power management chip to handle battery charging. The phone supports Qualcomm's "Quick Charge 1.0" technology, and can draw up to 2 amps from some (but not all) 2-amp chargers.

=== Networks ===
The device features quad-band (850/900/1800/1900) GSM connectivity for 2G networks. UMTS bands I (UMTS 2100), II (1900), IV (1700/2100/AWS), and V (850) are supported. HSPA+ Category 24 provides a maximum theoretical data speed of 42 Mbit/s.

The Snapdragon S4 chipset supports both GPS and GLONASS for location and navigation.

== Software ==
The device ships with an assortment of included software.

=== Carrier IQ ===
Carrier IQ is one of the many pieces of software included with the Galaxy S Relay. The software was produced by a controversial company based in Mountain View, California. It is not completely clear what the software does.

== See also ==
- Samsung Electronics
- Samsung Galaxy
- List of Android devices
- Android (operating system)
