= Xiaomi Mi 8 EE =

2018 Smartphones manufactured by Xiaomi

Xiaomi Mi 8 Explorer Edition
- Manufacturer: Xiaomi
- Type: Touchscreen smartphone
- Series: Mi
- Form factor: Slate
- Dimensions: 154.9 mm (6.10 in) H; 74.8 mm (2.94 in) W; 7.6 mm (0.30 in) D
- Weight: 177 g (6.2 oz)
- Operating system: MIUI 10 based on Android 8.1
- System-on-chip: Qualcomm SDM845 Snapdragon 845
- CPU: Octa-core (4x 2.8 GHz Performance Kryo 385 Gold cores + 4x 1.8 GHz efficiency Kryo 385 Silver cores)
- GPU: Adreno 630
- Memory: 8 GB LPDDR4X RAM
- Storage: 128 GB
- Battery: Non-removable Li-Po 3000 mAh battery
- Rear camera: Dual: 12 MP (f/1.8, 1/2.55", 1.4 μm, 4-axis OIS, dual-pixel PDAF) + 12 MP (f/2.4, 1/3.4", 1.0 μm), 2x optical zoom, dual pixel phase detection autofocus, dual-LED flash
- Front camera: 20 MP (f/2.0, 1.8 μm), 1080p
- Display: 6.21 inches, 1080 x 2248 pixels, 18:9 ratio (402 ppi), Super AMOLED capacitive touchscreen, 16M colors HDR10; DCI-P3
- Connectivity: 2G, 3G, 4G, 4G LTE, Wi-Fi 802.11a/b/g/n/ac (2.4 & 5GHz), dual-band, WiFi Direct, DLNA, hotspot Bluetooth V5, A2DP, Low-energy, aptX HD
- Codename: ursa

The Xiaomi Mi 8 Explorer Edition is a flagship Android smartphone developed by Xiaomi Inc. It was launched at an event held in Shenzhen, China.

== Specifications ==
=== Hardware ===
The Xiaomi Mi 8 EE is powered by the Qualcomm Snapdragon 845 processor, with 8 GB LPDDR4X RAM and Adreno 630 GPU. It has a 6.21-inch (158 mm) FullHD plus AMOLED display and 128 GB of storage. The handset features a fingerprint scanner integrated into the display and a 3,000 mAh battery with a USB-C reversible connector which supports Quick Charge 4.0+. It does not feature a 3.5mm headphone jack. The Mi 8 EE includes a dual camera setup with a 12 MP sensor with wide angle lens and a 12 MP sensor with telephoto lens. The front camera has a 20 MP sensor with aperture f/2.0. The Mi 8 EE camera has an overall score of 99 and a photo score of 105 on DxOMark. It also introduces a 3D facial recognition, IR facial unlock and a dual band GPS which allows reception of L1 and L5 signals simultaneously.

The Xiaomi Mi 8 EE features a transparent back which appears to show the working internal components of the phone. A controversy occurred over allegations that the visible internals are not the actual components of the phone but merely a sticker.

== Xiaomi Mi 8 Pro ==
Pro has more color options than standard or EE. It also has an under–screen fingerprint sensor, but 3D facial recognition was cancelled.
