= Xiaomi Mi 10T =

Smartphones manufactured by Xiaomi

Xiaomi Mi 10T (Redmi K30S Ultra in China) Xiaomi Mi 10T Pro Xiaomi Mi 10T Lite Xiaomi Mi 10i (Redmi Note 9 Pro 5G in China)
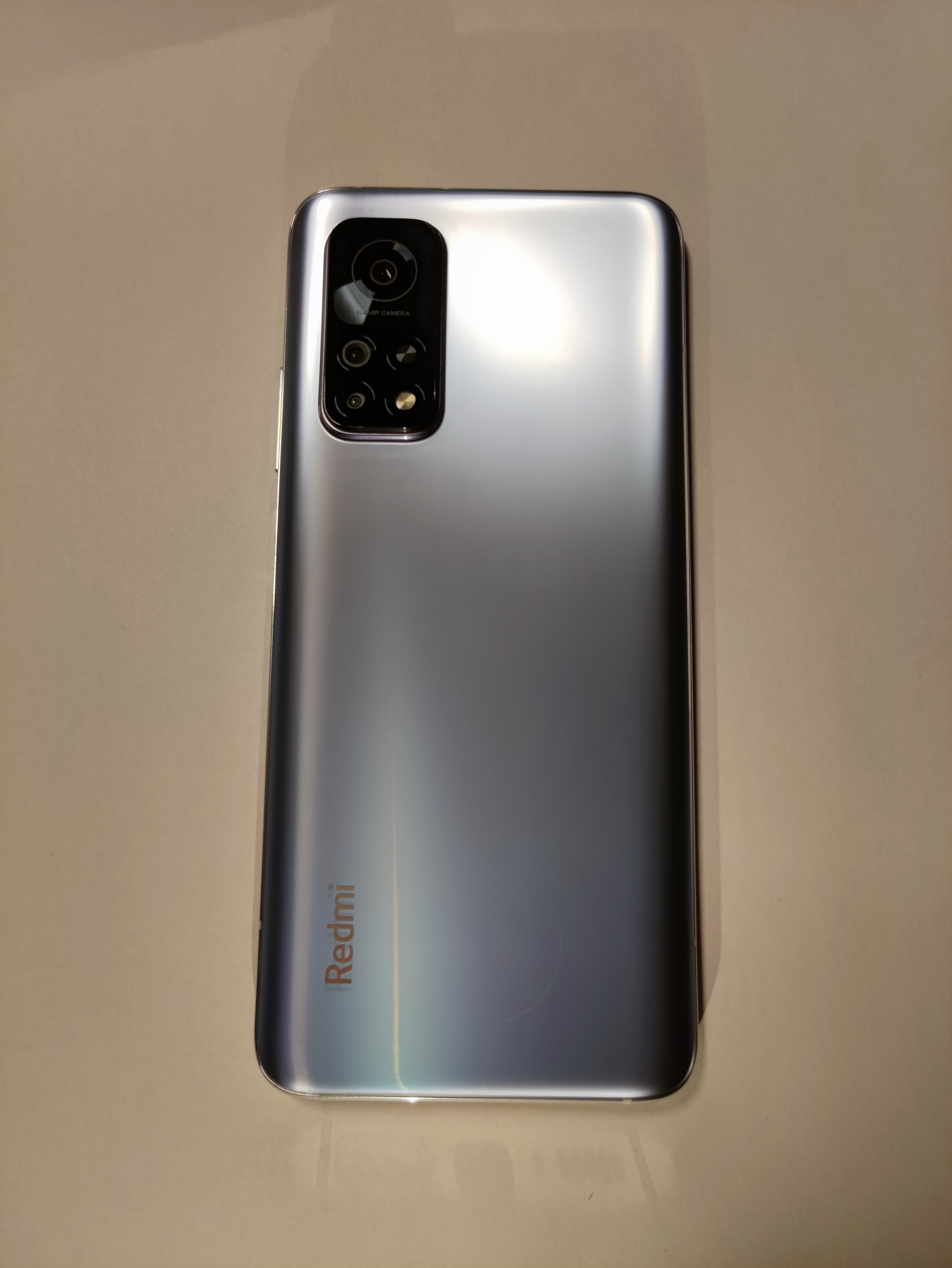
- Redmi K30S Ultra
- Also known as: Mi 10T: Mi 10T 5G; Mi 10T Pro: Mi 10T Pro 5G; Mi 10T Lite: Mi 10T Lite 5G; Mi 10i: Mi 10i 5G; Redmi K30S Ultra: Redmi K30S
- Manufacturer: Xiaomi
- Type: Phablet
- Series: Mi T Mi
- First released: September 30, 2020; 5 years ago
- Predecessor: Xiaomi Mi 9T/9T Pro
- Successor: Xiaomi 11T; Redmi K40S; Xiaomi 11i Redmi Note 10 Pro 5G
- Related: Xiaomi Mi 10; Xiaomi Mi 10 Ultra; Redmi K30/K30 Pro
- Compatible networks: 2G, 3G, 4G, 4G LTE, 5G
- Form factor: Slate
- Colors: Cosmic Black, Lunar Silver, Atlantic Blue; Pearl Gray, Rose Gold Beach (10T Lite)
- Dimensions: Mi 10T/Pro: 165.1 mm (6.50 in) H; 76.4 mm (3.01 in) W; 9.3 mm (0.37 in) D; Mi 10T Lite/Mi 10i: 165.1 mm (6.50 in) H; 76.4 mm (3.01 in) W; 9 mm (0.35 in) D
- Weight: Mi 10T: 216 g (7.6 oz); Mi 10T Pro: 218 g (7.7 oz); Mi 10T Lite/Mi 10i: 214.5 g (7.57 oz)
- Operating system: Original: MIUI 12 based on Android 10; Current: MIUI 14 based on Android 12
- System-on-chip: Mi 10T/Pro: Qualcomm Snapdragon 865; Mi 10T Lite/Mi 10i:Qualcomm Snapdragon 750G
- CPU: Mi 10T/10T Pro: Octa-core Kryo 585 (1x 2.84 GHz + 3x 2.42 GHz + 4x 1.8 GHz); Mi 10T Lite/Mi 10i:Octa-core Kryo 570 (2x 2.2GHz + 6x 1.8GHz)
- GPU: Mi 10T/Pro: Adreno 650; Mi 10T Lite: Adreno 619
- Memory: Mi 10T/Pro: LPDDR5 RAM; Mi 10T Lite/Mi 10i: LPDDR4X RAM: Mi 10T: 6 or 8 GB; Mi 10T Pro: 8 GB; Mi 10T Lite/Mi 10i: 4 or 6 GB
- Storage: Mi 10T/Pro: UFS 3.1; Mi 10T Lite/Mi 10i: UFS 2.1 or UFS 2.2: Mi 10T: 128 GB; Mi 10T Pro: 128 or 256 GB; Mi 10T Lite/Mi 10i: 64 or 128 GB
- Removable storage: Mi 10T/Pro:None; Mi 10T Lite/Mi 10i: Expandable via shared SIM slot
- Battery: Xiaomi Mi 10T/Pro: 5000 mAh (BM53); Xiaomi Mi 10T Lite/Mi 10i: 4820mAh (BM4W)
- Charging: 33 W
- Rear camera: Mi 10T: 64 MP, f/1.9, 1/1.73", 0.8µm, 26mm (wide) + 13 MP, f/2.4, 12mm (ultrawide) + 5 MP, f/2.4 (macro); Mi 10T Pro: 108 MP, f/1.7, 1/1.33", 0.8µm, 26mm (wide) + 13 MP, f/2.4, 12mm (ultrawide) + 5 MP, f/2.4 (macro), OIS; Mi 10T Lite: 64 MP Sony IMX682 (16MP, 4624×3472 px max.), f/1.9, 1/1.73, 1.60µm, 26mm (wide) + 8 MP (ultrawide) + 2 MP (macro) + 2 MP (depth); Mi 10i: 108 MP, 26mm (wide) + 8 MP (ultrawide) + 2 MP (macro) + 2 MP (depth); Mi 10T/Pro: PDAF, AF, LED flash, HDR, panorama, gyro-EIS, 8K@30fps, 4K@30/60fps, 1080p@30/60/120/240/960fps
- Front camera: 20 MP (f/2.2, 1/3.4", 0.8µm, 27mm), HDR, 1080p@30fps, 720p@120fps Mi 10T Lite/Mi 10i: PDAF, AF, LED flash, HDR, panorama, gyro-EIS, 4K@30fps, 1080p@30/60/120/240fps
- Display: Mi 10T/Pro: 6.67-inch IPS LCD capacitive touchscreen, 2400 × 1080 1080p (2.5 MP) (20:9 aspect ratio, 395 ppi), 144 Hz refresh rate, 16M colors, HDR10+ Gorilla Glass 5 Mi 10T Lite/Mi 10i: 6.67-inch IPS LCD capacitive touchscreen, 2400 × 1080 1080p (2.5 MP) (20:9 aspect ratio, 395 ppi), 120 Hz refresh rate, 16M colors, HDR10+ Gorilla Glass 5
- Connectivity: Wi-Fi 802.11a/b/g/n/ac/6 (2.4 & 5GHz), dual-band, WiFi Direct, DLNA, hotspot Bluetooth V5.1, A2DP, Low-energy, aptX HD
- Data inputs: Dual band GNSS (GPS (L1 + L5) / GLONASS (G1) / BeiDou / Galileo (E1 + E5a-)); IR sensor Accelerometer; Gyroscope ultrasonic distance sensor
- Model: M2007J3SY, M2007J17G (Lite)
- Codename: Mi 10T: apollo Mi 10T Pro: apollopro Mi 10T Lite: gauguin Mi 10i: gauguinpro

The Xiaomi Mi 10T (sold in China as Redmi K30S Ultra), Xiaomi Mi 10T Lite and Xiaomi Mi 10T Pro are Android-based smartphones developed by Xiaomi Inc. announced on 30 September 2020, while the Xiaomi Mi 10i (sold in China as Redmi Note 9 Pro 5G), which is based on Mi 10T Lite but with a 108 MP camera, was announced on 5 January 2021.

== Design ==
Smartphones use Gorilla Glass 5 for the screen and back panel. The Mi 10T and Mi 10T Pro are built with an anodized aluminum frame while Mi 10T Lite and Mi 10i with plastic frame. The fingerprint sensor is integrated into the power button on the right edge below the volume rocker, while the bottom edge has the USB-C port, a loudspeaker and the SIM card slot. The display has a circular cutout in the upper left-hand corner for the front-facing camera; the rear camera array is located in a rectangular protrusion. Mi 10T and Mi 10T Pro have Cosmic Black and Lunar Silver color options, with an additional Aurora Blue color for the Mi 10T Pro.

== Specifications ==
=== Hardware ===
The Mi 10T and Mi 10T Pro are powered by the Snapdragon 865 processor with the Adreno GPU while the Mi 10T Lite and Mi 10i are powered by Snapdragon 750G. Storage on Mi 10T and 10T Pro is non-expandable UFS 3.1, while the storage on 10T Lite and Mi 10i is expandable UFS 2.1 or 2.2; the Mi 10T has 128 GB, the Mi 10T Lite and MI 10i has 64 GB or 128 GB while the Mi 10T Pro has 128 or 256 GB. The Mi 10T has 6 or 8 GB of RAM, the Mi 10T Lite and Mi 10i have 4 or 6 GB of RAM while the Mi 10T Pro has 8 GB of RAM; both Mi 10T and 10T Pro have LPDDR5, while Mi 10T Lite and Mi 10i have LPDDR4X. Both phones feature a 6.67-inch (169 mm) FHD+ IPS LCD with HDR10+ support. The display is the same size as on the Mi 10 and Mi 10 Pro, but is not curved. Mi 10T and 10T Pro has an adaptive 144 Hz refresh rate branded as Smart AdaptiveSync Display which can detect static images and animations. The Mi 10T Lite also has that AdaptiveSync feature, but with a 120 Hz refresh rate. There are intermediate modes at 30 Hz, 48 Hz, 50 Hz, 60 Hz, or 90 Hz depending on the content being displayed, with 60, 90, and 144/120 Hz options in settings. The display also has MEMC (Motion Estimation, Motion Compensation) akin to "motion smoothening" on high-end TVs. The battery capacity is 5000 mAh; wired fast charging is supported over USB-C at up to 33 W. The Mi 10T and Mi 10T Pro have a triple camera setup. The wide lens uses a 64 MP sensor on the Mi 10T and a 108 MP sensor on the Mi 10T Pro; the 13 MP ultrawide sensor and 5 MP macro sensor are shared. Both are capable of recording video at 8K resolution. The front-facing camera uses a 20 MP sensor.

=== Software ===
The Mi 10T, 10T Lite, Mi 10T Pro, and Mi 10i run on Android 10, with Xiaomi's custom MIUI 12 skin. They were updated to MIUI 13 and later MIUI 14 based on Android 12.

== Censorship ==
In September 2021, the Lithuanian Ministry of National Defence recommended against purchasing or using Chinese mobile phones. It asked that the existing phones should be thrown away after the defence ministry's National Cyber Security Centre found that Xiaomi devices have built-in censorship capabilities that can be turned on remotely. Xiaomi phones sold in Europe had a built-in ability to detect and censor terms such as "Free Tibet", "Long live Taiwan independence" or "democracy movement". This capability was discovered in Xiaomi’s flagship phone Mi 10T 5G. The list of terms which could be censored by the Xiaomi phone's system apps, including the default web browser, in September 2021 includes 449 terms in Chinese and the list was continuously updated.

The National Cyber Security Centre of Lithuania also reported that the phone sends usage data to a server in Singapore.
