= Redmi K30 =

Smartphones manufactured by Xiaomi

Redmi K30 (Poco X2 in India) Redmi K30 5G Redmi K30i Redmi K30 5G Speed
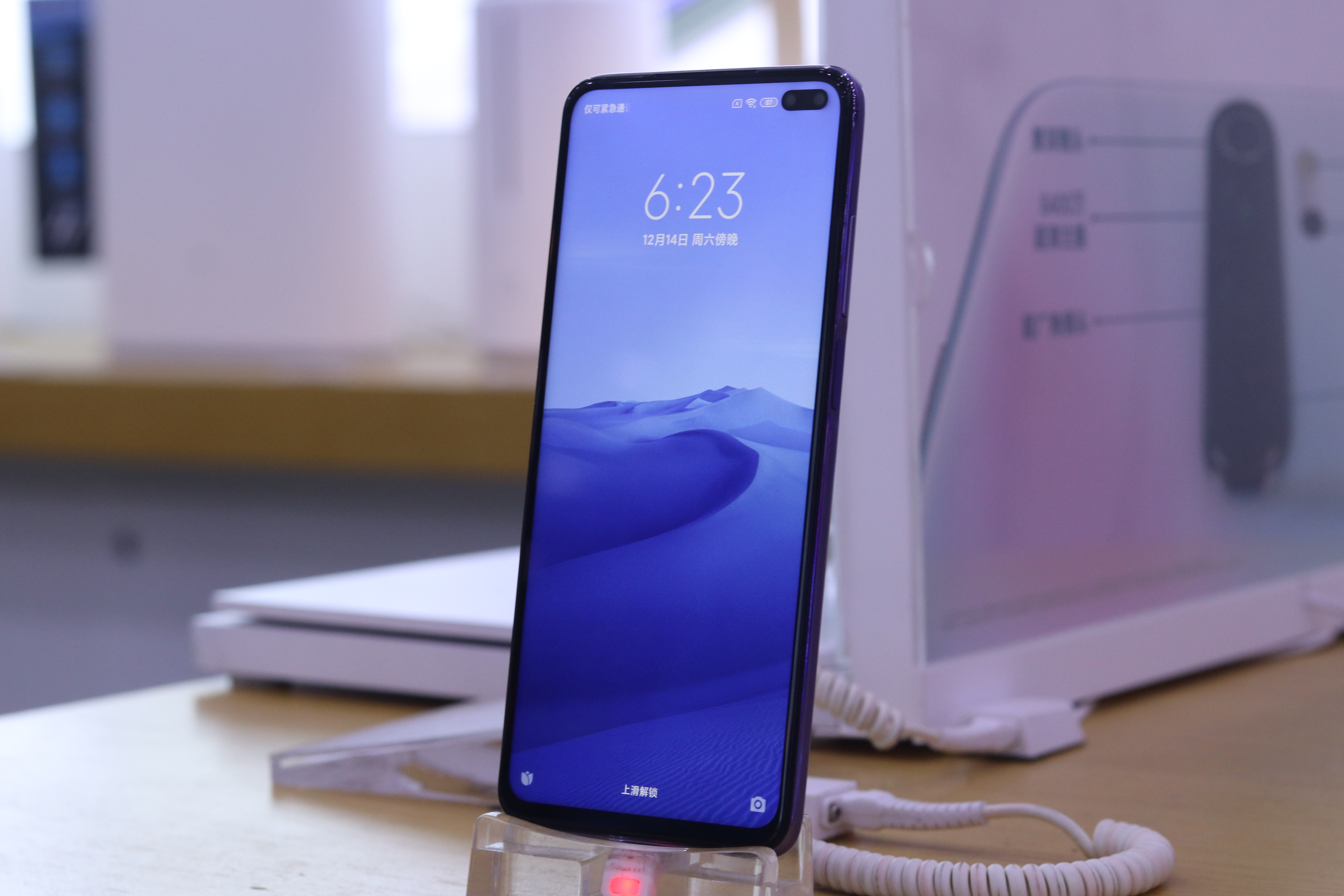
- Manufacturer: Xiaomi
- Type: Smartphone
- Series: Redmi K Poco X
- First released: K30: 12 December 2019; 6 years ago; K30 5G: 7 January 2020; 6 years ago; POCO X2: 11 February 2020; 6 years ago; K30 5G Speed: 14 May 2020; 6 years ago; K30i 5G: 7 June 2020; 6 years ago
- Predecessor: Redmi K20
- Successor: Redmi K40; Poco X3; Redmi K50i
- Related: Redmi K30 Pro; Redmi K30S Ultra
- Form factor: Slate
- Dimensions: 165.3 mm × 76.6 mm × 8.8 mm (6.51 in × 3.02 in × 0.35 in)
- Weight: 208 g (7.3 oz)
- Operating system: K30/K30 5G/5G Speed/K30i: Original: MIUI 11 based on Android 10 Current: MIUI 13 based on Android 12; Poco X2: Original: MIUI 11 for Poco based on Android 10 Current: MIUI 12.5 for Poco based on Android 11
- System-on-chip: K30 & Poco X2: Qualcomm SM7150-AB Snapdragon 730G; K30 5G/K30i: Qualcomm SM7250-AB Snapdragon 765G; K30 5G Speed: Qualcomm SM 7250-AC Snapdragon 768G
- CPU: Octa-core: K30/Poco X2: (2 + 6 cores (2x 2.2 GHz Kryo 470 Gold – Cortex A76 derivative + 6x 1.8 GHz Kryo 470 Silver Cortex A55 derivative)); K30 5G/K30i: (1 + 1 + 6 cores (1x 2.4-2.8 GHz Kryo 475 Prime – Cortex A76 derivative + 1x 2.2 GHz Kryo 475 Gold – Cortex A76 derivative + 6x 1.8 GHz Kryo 475 Silver – Cortex A55 derivative))
- GPU: K30/Poco X2: Adreno 618; K30 5G/5G Speed/K30i: Adreno 620
- Memory: 6 or 8 GB RAM
- Storage: 64, 128 or 256 GB UFS
- Removable storage: None; K30/Poco X2: microSD, up to 256 GB
- Battery: 4500 mAh
- Rear camera: Wide: K30/5G/5G Speed/Poco X2: Sony Exmor RS IMX686 64 MP (f/1.9, 26mm, 1/1.7", 0.8 μm) K30i: Sony IMX58 48 MP (f/1.96, 1/2"); Ultrawide: 8 MP (f/2.2, 13mm, 1/4", 1.12 μm); Macro: K30/K30i/Poco X2: 2 MP (f/2.4, 1/5", 1.75 μm) K30 5G/5G Speed: 5 MP (f/2.4, 1/5"); Depth: 2 MP (f/2.4, 1/5", 1.75 μm), PDAF; Other: Dual-LED flash, panorama, HDR, 4K@30fps, 1080p@30/120fps, 720p@960fps
- Front camera: 20 MP, (f/2.2, 27mm, 1/3.4", 0.8 μm) + 2 MP depth sensor, (f/2.4, 1/5", 1.75 μm) HDR, 1080p@30fps
- Display: 6.67 in (169 mm) IPS LCD capacitive touchscreen, 1080 x 2400 pixels, 20:9 ratio (395 ppi), 16M colors, 120 Hz refresh rate
- Connectivity: 2G, 3G, 4G, 4G LTE, 5G, Wi-Fi 802.11a/b/g/n/ac (2.4 & 5GHz), dual-band, WiFi Direct, DLNA, hotspot Bluetooth 5.0 (K30/Poco X2) or 5.1, A2DP, Low-energy, aptX-HD
- Codename: K30: phoenix Poco X2: phoenixin K30 5G/5G Speed: picasso K30i: picasso_48m

Redmi K30 is a line of Android-based smartphones manufactured by Xiaomi and marketed under its Redmi sub-brand. There are two main models, the K30 and the K30 5G. A rebranded version of the K30 was later announced for India as the Poco X2, followed by the K30 5G Speed, which has a faster version of the K30 5G's chipset, and the K30i 5G which has a lower resolution camera sensor.

== Design ==
The K30 line uses an anodized aluminum frame and Gorilla Glass on the front and back. Both the volume and power buttons are located on the right edge; the latter is recessed slightly. The front features dual front-facing cameras housed in a pill-shaped cutout, resembling the Galaxy S10+. The camera protrusion on the back panel is a single unit with a dual-LED flash below and an oval module. Colors available at launch were (Phoenix) Red, (Matrix) Purple, and (Atlantis) Blue, with an additional White finish available on the 5G version and a Mint finish on the 5G Speed version.

== Specifications ==
=== Hardware & Software ===
The non-Pro models are powered by Qualcomm Snapdragon 700 series SoCs, with the K30 and Poco X2 retaining the K20's Snapdragon 730G and Adreno 618 while the K30 5G and K30i 5G receive the newer Snapdragon 765G and Adreno 620. The K30 5G Speed has the Snapdragon 768G paired with an overclocked version of the Adreno 620. Storage and RAM options have been carried over from the K20 (64, 128 or 256 GB of UFS 2.1 storage and 6 or 8 GB of RAM), and microSD card expansion is now supported up to 256 GB on the K30 and Poco X2. The K30i 5G and K30 5G Speed have a single 6 GB RAM/128 GB UFS configuration. The display is larger than the K20's at 6.67" (169.4mm) and has a wider 20:9 aspect ratio with a 120 Hz refresh rate and HDR10 support. However, it is an LCD as opposed to the AMOLED of the K20, and as a result, the fingerprint sensor is integrated with the power button. The battery is also larger at 4500mAh; fast charging is supported over USB-C up to 27W on the K30 and Poco X2, or up to 30W on the K30 5G & K30i 5G. All devices are pre-installed with MIUI 11, which is based on Android 10. Later, the Redmi K30 series got the update of MIUI 13 with Android 12 but Poco X2 was updated only to MIUI 12.5 for Poco with Android 11 but was planned to update to MIUI 13 for Poco with Android 12.

==== Camera ====
The wide sensor on all K30 variants except for the K30i 5G has been upgraded from a 48 MP sensor to a 64 MP sensor and now features an extra depth sensor. There is an 8 MP ultrawide sensor, and a 2 or 5 MP macro lens. The front-facing camera uses a 20 MP sensor along with a secondary depth module of 2 MP.
