= Redmi K30 Pro =

Smartphones manufactured by Xiaomi

Redmi K30 Pro Redmi K30 Pro Zoom Poco F2 Pro Redmi K30 Ultra
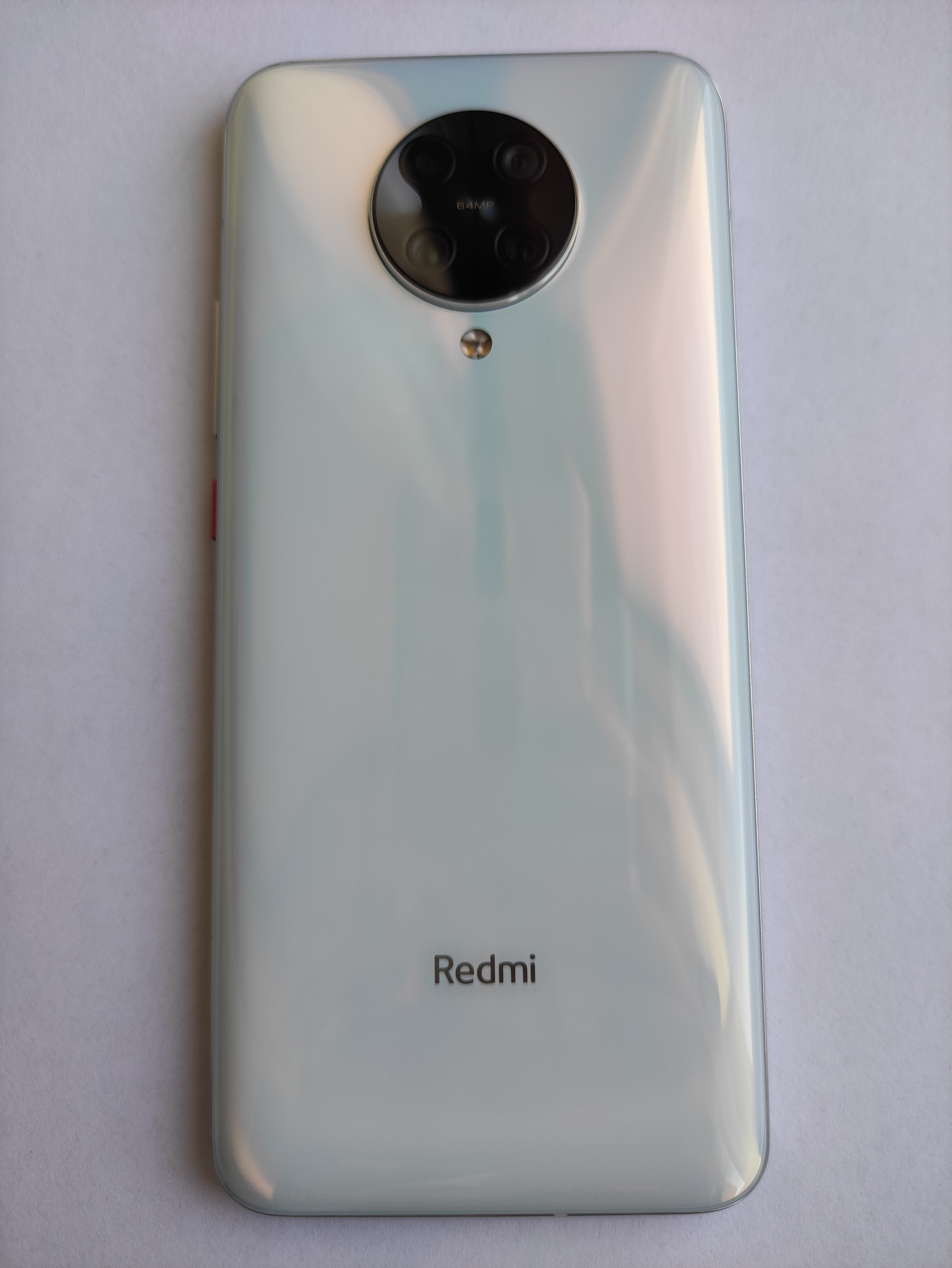
- Redmi K30 Pro
- Manufacturer: Xiaomi
- Type: Touchscreen smartphone
- Series: Redmi K Poco F
- First released: K30 Pro: 27 March 2020; 6 years ago; K30 Pro Zoom: 4 April 2020; 6 years ago; Poco F2 Pro: 19 May 2020; 6 years ago; K30 Ultra: 14 August 2020; 5 years ago
- Predecessor: Redmi K20 Pro
- Successor: Redmi K40 Pro; Poco F5 Pro
- Related: Redmi K30; Redmi K30S Ultra
- Form factor: Slate
- Dimensions: 163.3 mm × 75.4 mm × 8.9 mm–9.1 mm (6.43 in × 2.97 in × 0.35 in–0.36 in)
- Weight: K30 Ultra: 213 g (7.5 oz); K30 Pro/K30 Pro Zoom: 218 g (7.7 oz); Poco F2 Pro: 219 g (7.7 oz)
- Operating system: Original: MIUI 11 based on Android 10; Current: MIUI 14 based on Android 12
- System-on-chip: Qualcomm SM8250 Snapdragon 865; K30 Ultra: MediaTek Dimensity 1000+
- CPU: Octa-core (1 + 3 + 4 cores (1x 2.84 GHz Kryo 585 Prime – Cortex A77 derivative + 3x 2.42 GHz Kryo 585 Gold – Cortex A77 derivative + 4x 1.8 GHz Kryo 585 Silver – Cortex A55 derivative)); K30 Ultra: (4 + 4 cores (4x 2.6 GHz Cortex-A77 + 4x 2.0 GHz Cortex-A55))
- GPU: Adreno 650; K30 Ultra: Mali-G77 MC9
- Memory: Poco F2 Pro/K30 Ultra: 6 GB or 8 GB RAM; K30 Pro: 6 GB, 8 GB or 12 GB RAM; K30 Pro Zoom: 8 GB or 12 GB RAM
- Storage: K30 Pro/Poco F2 Pro: 128 GB or 256 GB; K30 Pro Zoom/K30 Ultra: 128 GB, 256 GB or 512 GB
- Removable storage: None
- Battery: 4700 mAh; K30 Ultra: 4500 mAh
- Rear camera: K30 Pro/ F2 Pro/K30 Ultra: Quad: Sony Exmor RS IMX686 64 MP wide (f/1.9, 26mm, 1/1.72", 0.8 μm) + 13 MP ultrawide, (f/2.4, 13mm, 1.12 μm) + 5 MP telephoto macro, (f/2.2, 50mm) + 2 MP, depth sensor, (f/2.4), AF, PDAF, 2x zoom, Dual-LED flash, panorama, HDR, 8K@24/30fps, 4K@30/60fps, 1080p@30/60/120/240/960fps K30 Ultra cannot record in 8K; K30 Pro Zoom: Quad: Sony Exmor RS IMX686 64 MP wide (26mm, 1/1.72", 0.8 μm) + 13 MP ultrawide, (f/2.4, 13mm, 1.12 μm) + 8 MP telephoto + 2 MP depth sensor, (f/2.4), PDAF, OIS, 3x optical zoom, Dual-LED flash, panorama, HDR, 8K@24/30fps, 4K@30/60fps, 1080p@30/60/120/240/960fps
- Front camera: 20 MP, (f/2.2, 27mm, 1/3.4", 0.8 μm) HDR, 1080p@30fps, 720p@120fps
- Display: 6.67 in (169 mm) AMOLED capacitive touchscreen, 1080x2400 pixels (2.5 MP), 20:9 ratio (395 ppi), 16M colors, 60 Hz refresh rate K30 Ultra: 120 Hz refresh rate
- Connectivity: 2G, 3G, 4G, 4G LTE, 5G, Wi-Fi 802.11a/b/g/n/ac (2.4 & 5GHz), dual-band, WiFi Direct, DLNA, hotspot Bluetooth V5.1, A2DP, Low-energy, aptX-HD
- Codename: K30 Pro/Poco F2 Pro: lmi; K30 Pro Zoom: lmipro; K30 Ultra: cezanne

Redmi K30 Pro is a line of Android-based smartphones manufactured by Xiaomi and marketed under its Redmi sub-brand. There are four models, the K30 Pro, K30 Pro Zoom, K30 Ultra and the Poco F2 Pro, which is a rebranded version of the K30 Pro.

The company discontinued the smartphone's sale in favor of the successor Redmi K40 Pro lineup in 2021.

== Design ==
The K30 Pro line uses an anodized aluminum frame and Gorilla Glass on the front and back. Both the volume and power buttons are located on the right edge; the latter has a red accent. The front-facing camera is concealed by a motorized pop-up mechanism like on the K20 Pro. The camera protrusion on the back panel is a single unit with a dual-LED flash below, and a circular module. Colors available at launch were (Cyber) Grey, (Electric) Purple, (Phantom) White and (Neon) Blue. The K30 Ultra has unique Moonlight White, Midnight Black and Mint Green finishes.

== Specifications ==
=== Hardware & software ===
The Pro models are powered by the Snapdragon 865 and Adreno 650, while the K30 Ultra uses the MediaTek Dimensity 1000+ and Mali-G77 MC9. The K30 Pro, K30 Pro Zoom and Poco F2 Pro have either 128 or 256 GB of storage and 6 or 8 GB of RAM with an additional 12 GB RAM/512 GB UFS variant on the K30 Pro Zoom; the 128 GB/6 GB K30 Pro model has UFS 3.0 while other models have UFS 3.1. The Poco F2 Pro has UFS 3.1 on all models and no 8 GB RAM/128 GB UFS variant. At the front, the display is larger than the K20's at 6.67" (169.4mm) and has a wider 20:9 aspect ratio, using an AMOLED panel with an optical fingerprint sensor and HDR10+ support; only the K30 Ultra has a 120 Hz refresh rate. The battery is 4700mAh; fast charging is supported over USB-C up to 30 W or 33 W. The K30 Ultra has a smaller 4500 mAh battery. All devices are pre-installed with MIUI 11, which is based on Android 10. Among other features, there is FM Radio, Dual SIM support, NFC, Infrared, Face Unlock, and LiquidCool 2.0 in the phone.

Xiaomi released another version of the phone, Redmi K30 Pro Zoom, with almost similar features except 3x optical zoom.

==== Camera ====
The wide sensor on all variants has been upgraded from a Sony IMX586 48 MP sensor to a Sony IMX686 64 MP sensor and now features an extra depth sensor. The K30 Pro Zoom benefits from the usage of optical image stabilization on the wide lens. It has an 8 MP telephoto lens with 3x optical zoom, while the K30 Pro and Poco F2 Pro have a 5 MP "telemacro" lens which has twice the focal length of a standard macro lens. Both are accompanied by a 13 MP ultrawide sensor. The front-facing camera uses a motorized pop-up Samsung S5K3T2 20 MP sensor, f/2.2, (wide), 1/3.4", 0.8 μm with HDR.
