= HTC One =

HTC One may refer to:

- HTC One series, an HTC flagship smartphone product line
- HTC One (M7), a smartphone released by HTC in 2013, originally released as the HTC One
- HTC One (M8), a smartphone released by HTC in 2014
- HTC One M9, a smartphone released by HTC in 2015
- HTC 10, a smartphone released by HTC in 2016
- HTC One Mini, a smartphone released by HTC in 2013
- HTC One Mini 2, a smartphone released by HTC in 2014
