= HTC One E9+ =

Android smartphone

- Manufacturer: HTC
- Type: Smartphone
- Series: HTC One
- Predecessor: HTC One E8
- Form factor: Slate
- Dimensions: 156.5 mm (6.16 in) H 76.5 mm (3.01 in) W 7.54 mm (0.297 in) D
- Weight: 149 g (5.3 oz)
- Operating system: Android 5.0 "Lollipop"
- System-on-chip: MediaTek HelioX10 MT6795
- CPU: 2.0 GHz true octa-core
- GPU: PowerVR G6200 @700 MHz
- Memory: 3 GB LPDDR4 RAM
- Storage: 32 GB
- Removable storage: microSD up to 128 GB
- Battery: 2,800 mAh Li-Po
- Rear camera: 20.2 MP with auto / manual focus, 1/2.3", 27.8mm, ƒ/2.2, LED flash, 4K video recording @30 fps, 1080p @60 fps, 720p @120 fps
- Front camera: 13 MP, UltraPixel fixed-focus camera, ƒ/2.0 aperture, 1/3", 26.8 mm 1080p video recording @30 fps
- Display: 5.5 in (140 mm) WQHD; 1440 x 2560 pixels (16:9 Aspect ratio) (534 ppi)
- Sound: HTC Dolby Digital Boomsound
- Connectivity: List: Wi-Fi; DLNA; GPS/GLONASS; NFC; Bluetooth 4.1; MHL 3.0; USB 2.0 (Micro-B port, USB charging); 3.50 mm (0.138 in) headphone jack
- Data inputs: List: Accelerometer; Gesture sensor; Gyroscope
- Codename: HTC A55

The HTC One E9+ is an Android smartphone manufactured and marketed by HTC which was announced in March 2015 on their official Chinese website.

== Specifications ==
=== Hardware ===
The body of the HTC One E9+ is made up of hybrid plastic and metal design where the front side of the device is made up of metal and rear side of the device is made up of metal-tone plastic. The device weighs 149 g (5.3 oz) with the dimensions of 156.5 mm (6.16 in) height, 76.5 mm (3.01 in) width and 7.54 mm (0.297 in) depth. The display of the device is 5.5 in (140 mm) WQHD with a resolution of 1440 x 2562 pixels and pixel density of 534 ppi.

The device features an octa-core MediaTek HelioX10 MT6795 system on chip with the speed of 2.0 GHz The internal storage of the device is 32 GB with expandable storage via microSD card up to 128 GB. The memory of the device is 3 GB LPDDR4 RAM.

The HTC One E9+ is equipped with a 20.2 megapixel rear-facing camera with LED flash. The front facing camera is UltraPixel image sensor (which has larger pixels in its sensor, but sacrificed megapixel size for enhanced low-light capabilities) with ƒ/2.0 aperture and 26.8 mm lens which is also capable of recording videos at 1080p. Similar to the One M9, the device also features the front stereo speakers "BoomSound" that uses Dolby Audio tuning.

== Sales ==
The HTC One E9+ was launched in India in June 2015. On 24 June 2015, the device was released in the United Arab Emirates.
