= HTC One M9+ =

Android smartphone

- Manufacturer: HTC
- Type: Smartphone
- Series: HTC One
- Related: HTC One M9
- Form factor: Slate
- Dimensions: 150.99 mm (5.944 in) H 71.99 mm (2.834 in) W 9.61 mm (0.378 in) D
- Weight: 163 g (5.7 oz)
- Operating system: Original: Android 5.0 "Lollipop"; Current: Android 6.0 "Marshmallow"
- System-on-chip: MediaTek HelioX10 MT6795
- CPU: 2.2 GHz octa-core
- GPU: IMG Rogue G6200
- Memory: 3 GB LPDDR4 RAM
- Storage: 32 GB
- Removable storage: microSD up to 2 TB
- Battery: 2,840 mAh Li-Po
- Rear camera: 20 MP duo-camera with autofocus, dual-LED dual tone flash, f/2.2 aperture, 27.8 mm lens 4K (2160p) video recording
- Front camera: 4 MP, UltraPixel fixed-focus camera, ƒ/2.0 aperture, 26.8 mm 1080p video recording
- Display: 5.2 in (130 mm) WQHD; 1440 x 2560 pixels (16:9 Aspect ratio) (565 ppi)
- Connectivity: List: Wi-Fi; DLNA; GPS/GLONASS; NFC; Bluetooth 4.1; MHL 3.0; USB 2.0 (Micro-B port, USB charging); 3.50 mm (0.138 in) headphone jack; CIR
- Data inputs: List: Accelerometer; Gesture sensor; Gyroscope; fingerprint sensor

The HTC One M9+ is an Android-based smartphone manufactured and marketed by HTC which was announced on April 8, 2015. Initially on launch, the device was only sold in China. In July 2015, the device was released in Europe excluding the United Kingdom.

The device is an upscaled version of the One M9 where it comes with a larger screen and fingerprint sensor.

On September 29, 2015, HTC relaunched the One M9+ as the HTC One M9+ Supreme Camera Edition which features an upgraded camera module and it was released in Taiwan on October 6, 2015.

== Specifications ==
=== Hardware ===
The unibody design of the device is similar to the One M9. the device features a multi directional fingerprint sensor which is embedded along with the home button located on the bottom of the front side of the phone. The device weighs 163 g (5.7 oz) with the dimensions of 150.99 mm (5.944 in) height, 71.9 mm (2.83 in) width and 9.61 mm (0.378 in) depth. The display of the device is 5.2 in (130 mm) WQHD with a resolution of 1440 x 2562 pixels and pixel density of 565 ppi.

The device features an octa-core MediaTek HelioX10 MT6795 system on chip with the speed of 2.2 GHz instead of the Qualcomm Snapdragon 810. The internal storage of the device is 32 GB with expandable storage via microSD card up to 2 TB. The memory of the device is 3 GB LPDDR4 RAM.

The HTC One M9+ is equipped with a 20 megapixel BSI rear-facing camera with Toshiba T4AKP7 CMOS image sensor dual-LED dual tone flash, f/2.2 aperture, 27.8 mm lens covered with sapphire. Similarly found in the One M8, The main camera is accompanied by a second, 2-megapixel depth of field sensor (OmniVision OV2722) located directly above the main camera as a part of the device's "Duo Camera" system. The camera is also capable of recording videos in 4K (2160p) resolution. Similar to the One M9, the front facing camera is UltraPixel image sensor (which has larger pixels in its sensor, but sacrificed megapixel size for enhanced low-light capabilities) with ƒ/2.0 aperture and 26.8 mm lens which is also capable of recording videos at 1080p.

== Supreme Camera Edition ==
In Taiwan, HTC released an upgraded version of the M9+, called the One M9+ Supreme Camera Edition (known as "HTC M9+ with laser autofocus and optical stabilizer" or "HTC M9+ Aurora edition" in Taiwan), featuring an improved Sony IMX230 camera module. Unlike the One M9+, the device's rear camera is equipped with a 21 megapixel along with optical image stabilization, 0.1 second phase detection autofocus and infrared laser auto focus.
