= HTC 10 =

2016 Android smartphone manufactured by HTC

- Manufacturer: HTC
- Type: Smartphone
- Predecessor: HTC One M9
- Successor: HTC U Ultra; HTC U11
- Compatible networks: GSM, CDMA, 3G, EVDO, HSPA+, LTE, LTE Advanced
- Form factor: Slate
- Dimensions: 145.9 mm (5.74 in) H 71.9 mm (2.83 in) W 9 mm (0.35 in) D
- Weight: 161 g (5.7 oz)
- Operating system: Android 6.0.1 "Marshmallow" (release); Android 7.0 "Nougat"; Android 8.0 "Oreo" (current); Android 12 (unofficial) via LineageOS 19.1
- System-on-chip: Qualcomm Snapdragon 820
- GPU: Adreno 530
- Memory: 4 GB LPDDR4 RAM
- Storage: 32 or 64 GB
- Removable storage: microSD up to 2 TB
- Battery: 3.8 V, 11.5 Wh (3,000 mAh) Li-Ion, non-replaceable
- Rear camera: Sony Exmor R IMX377 12.3 megapixels (4032×3024 px), Laser autofocus, dual-LED dual tone flash, f/1.8 aperture, 26 mm lens, optical image stabilization
- Front camera: 5 MP, f/1.8 aperture, optical image stabilization
- Display: 5.2 in (130 mm) Super LCD 5 with RGB matrix 2560 x 1440 pixels (564 ppi); Corning Gorilla Glass 4
- Connectivity: List: Bluetooth 4.2; NFC; USB 3.1 Gen 1 Type-C connector (supports DisplayPort); Wi-Fi (802.11 a/b/g/n/ac)
- Data inputs: List: Accelerometer; Gyroscope
- Model: 10
- Codename: Perfume
- Website: www.htc.com/us/smartphones/htc-10/

The HTC 10 is an Android-based smartphone manufactured and marketed by HTC. It was announced on April 12, 2016.

== History ==
In 2015, HTC released the HTC One M9 smartphone, which was praised for its design, but criticized for being too similar to its predecessor, the HTC One (M8). To address the shortcomings of the M9, HTC released another new phone that year with a new design and hardware: the HTC One A9. The design of the HTC 10 is something of a mix of the M9 and the A9.

== Specifications ==
=== Hardware ===
The HTC 10 features an aluminum body with a unibody design. The dual front-facing audio speakers from previous HTC smartphones (such as the HTC One M9) have been removed. The phone still has 2 speakers; however, one is on the top bezel and the other on the bottom edge. The HTC 10 also includes a fingerprint sensor under the 5.2-inch 1440x2560 Gorilla Glass 3 screen.

The internals of the HTC 10 are similar to those of its contemporary flagships. The HTC 10 includes the quad-core Qualcomm Snapdragon 820 processor and 4 GB RAM and Adreno 530 integrated graphics. The HTC 10 also features USB-C and Qualcomm QuickCharge 3.0. The HTC 10 features a dedicated DAC (Digital Audio Converter) provided by Qualcomm.

The HTC 10 has the first optically stabilized front-facing camera in a mobile phone.

=== Software ===
The HTC 10 runs Android 6.0 Marshmallow with the HTC Sense 8.0 skin. HTC updated unlocked handsets to Android 7.0 Nougat on November 25, 2016. The unlocked HTC 10 received the Android 8.0 Oreo update in early 2018.

The HTC 10 is among the few smartphones to be equipped with support for Apple's proprietary AirPlay protocol.

== Reception ==
The HTC 10 received generally positive reviews. In its review of the phone, CNET gave the device a 4 out of 5, praising the design, "brilliant audio quality", and customizable user interface, while criticizing the camera and battery life. The Verge gave the device a similar 8.0 out of 10, but viewed some aspects of the phone differently: it considered the device's "reliable battery", sound, software, and "fast performance" to be its strengths, while criticizing the HTC 10's "boring design", camera, and price. On the audio quality front, due to its inclusion of a dedicated DAC, Android Central praised the audio of the HTC 10 when using headphones connected to the headphone jack, saying of the experience, "Spoiler: it sounds good. Damn good"

Preceded by HTC One M9	HTC 10; 2016	Succeeded by HTC U Ultra; HTC U11
