= HTC One Mini 2 =

Android smartphone

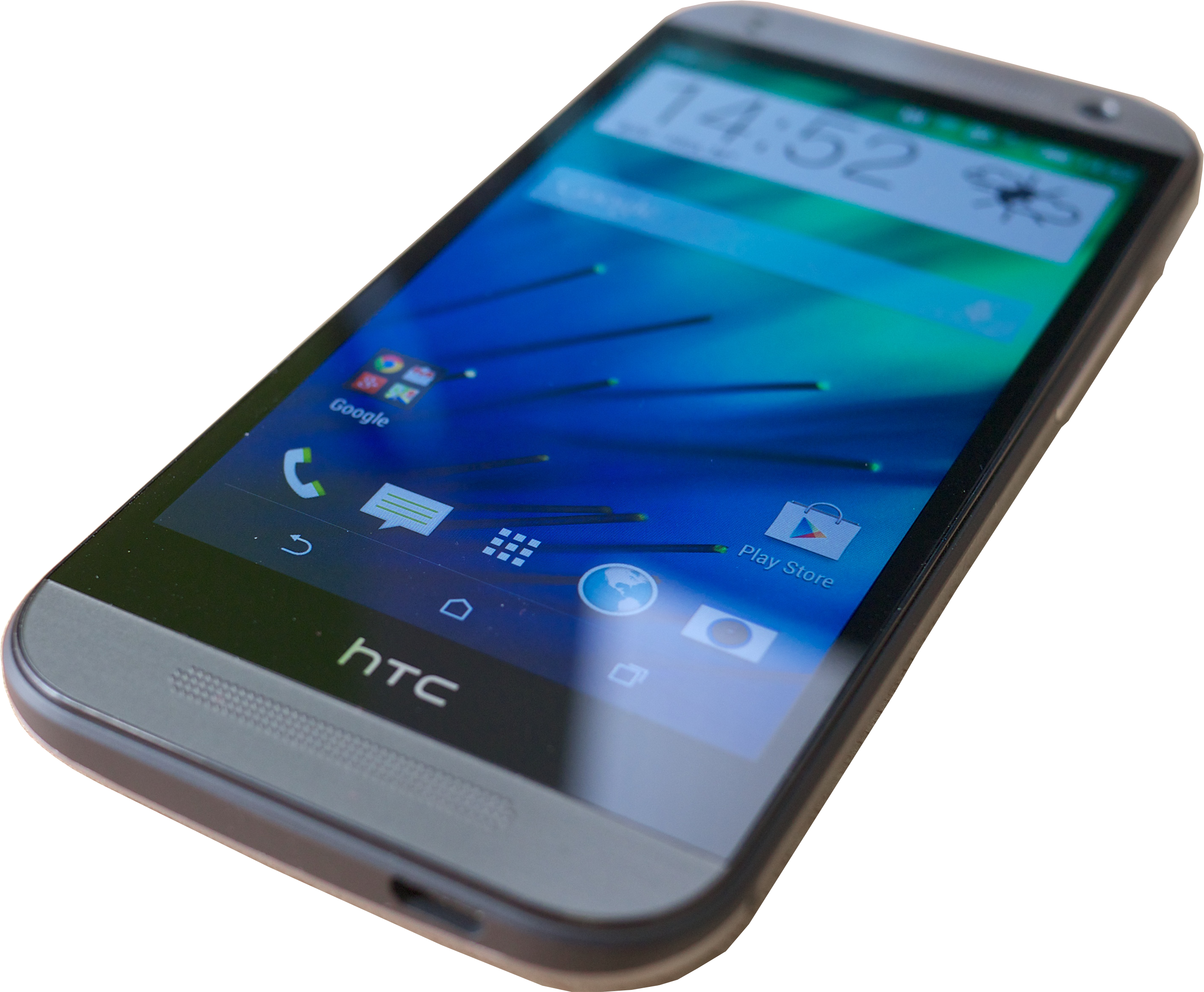
- Manufacturer: HTC
- Type: Smartphone
- Series: HTC One
- First released: May 2014
- Predecessor: HTC One Mini
- Successor: HTC One A9
- Related: HTC One S, HTC One, HTC One Max, HTC First
- Form factor: Slate
- Dimensions: 137.43 mm (5.411 in) H 65.04 mm (2.561 in) W 10.6 mm (0.42 in) D
- Weight: 137 g (4.8 oz)
- Operating system: Android 4.4 KitKat
- System-on-chip: Qualcomm Snapdragon 400
- CPU: 1.2 GHz quad-core ARM Cortex-A7
- GPU: Adreno 305
- Memory: 1 GB RAM
- Storage: 16 GB
- Removable storage: microSD, microSDHC, microSDXC up to 128 GB
- Battery: 2,100 mAh Li-Po
- Rear camera: 13-megapixel, 1.12 μm camera with auto focus, UltraPixel BSI image sensor, Geotagging, smart LED flash, F2.2 aperture, 1080p HD video recording, video stabilization
- Front camera: 5-megapixel front camera (1080p for recording and video chat)
- Display: 4.5 in (110 mm) Super LCD 2 with RGB matrix 720×1280 pixels 16:9 Aspect ratio) (326 ppi); Corning Gorilla Glass 3.0
- Connectivity: Wi-Fi: 802.11 a/b/g/n (2.4/5 GHz); GPS & GLONASS; Bluetooth 4.0 with apt-X; DLNA; Wi-Fi Direct; Miracast; Wi-Fi Hotspot; USB 2.0 (Micro-B Port, USB charging); 3.5 millimetres (0.14 in) TRRS
- Codename: Memul
- Other: Accelerometer, gyroscope, digital compass, proximity sensor, ambient light sensor, Voice dialing, Voice commands, Voice recording

The HTC One Mini 2 is an Android smartphone designed and manufactured by HTC. The One Mini 2 is a mid-range variant of HTC's 2014 flagship high-end smartphone, the HTC One. As such, the One Mini 2 was designed to provide an overall experience as similar to its high-end counterpart as possible, while still being competitively priced in comparison to other smartphones in its range. Officially unveiled on 15 May 2014, the One Mini 2 was expected to be released mid-June in Europe, the Middle East and Asia, with no official date for other regions. On Verizon Wireless, the model is branded as the HTC One Remix. The Remix differs from the One Mini 2 in that it has 1.5 GB of RAM.

== Specifications ==
The One mini 2 replaces the original HTC One Mini, which itself was a smaller, cut-down version of the HTC One M7 from 2013. The new “mini” smartphone has a 4.5 in high-definition screen, which makes it larger than an iPhone 5S and most other smaller, mid-range phones. A new 5-megapixel camera on the front allow users to remove red eye and smooth out skin.

== See also ==
- HTC One series
