= HTC One A9 =

Android smartphone manufactured by HTC

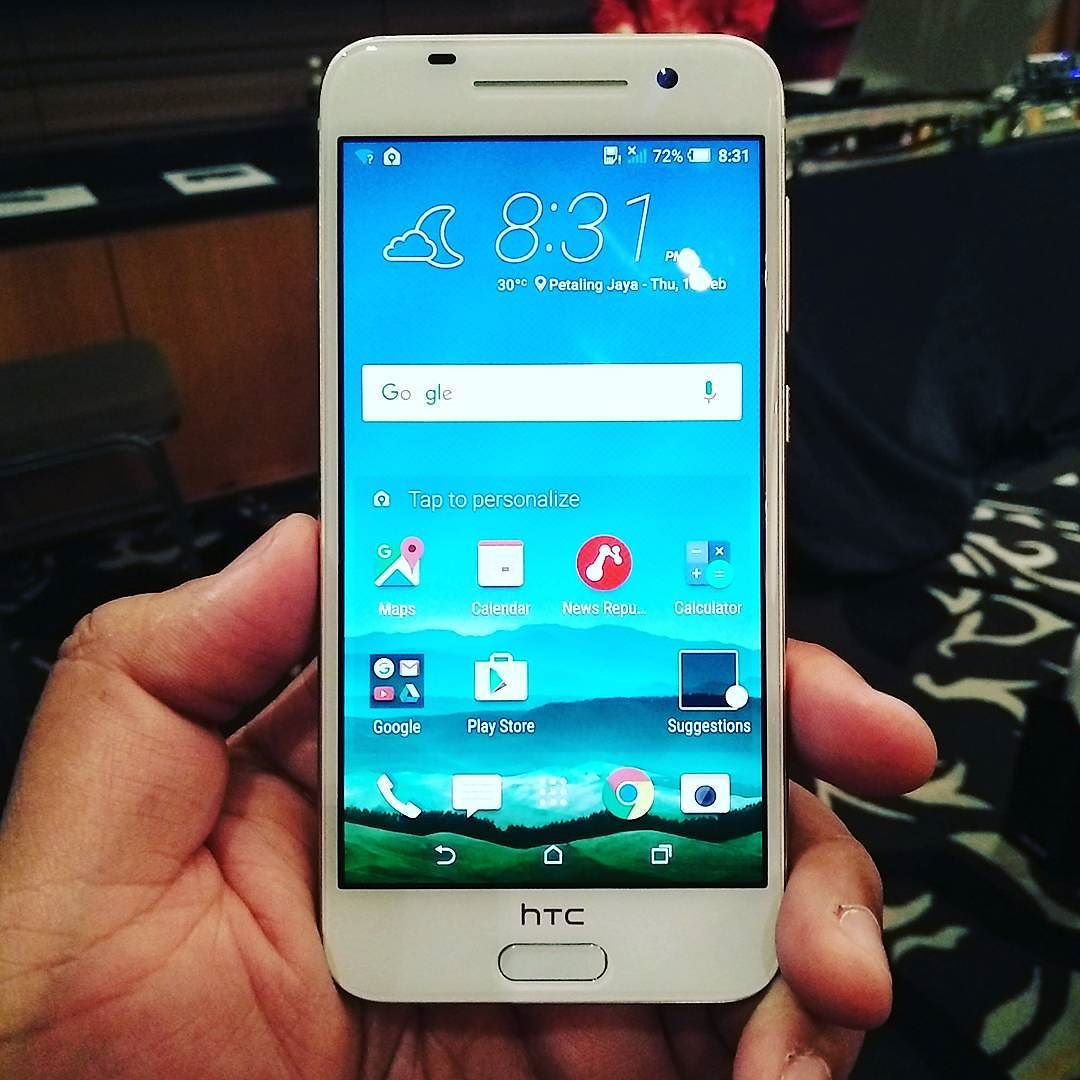
- Manufacturer: HTC
- Type: Smartphone
- Series: HTC One
- Predecessor: HTC One Mini 2
- Form factor: Slate
- Dimensions: 145.75 mm (5.738 in) H 70.8 mm (2.79 in) W 7.26 mm (0.286 in) D
- Weight: 143 g (5.0 oz)
- Operating system: Original: Android 6.0 "Marshmallow" Current: Android 7.0 "Nougat" Unofficial: Android 12 via LineageOS
- System-on-chip: Qualcomm Snapdragon 617
- CPU: Octa-core ARM 64-bit 1.5 GHz
- GPU: Adreno 405 OpenGL ES 3.1
- Memory: 2 GB or 3 GB LPDDR4 RAM
- Storage: 16 GB or 32 GB
- Removable storage: microSD up to 2 TB
- Battery: 2150 mAh Li-Po
- Rear camera: 13 MP with autofocus, dual-LED dual tone flash, ƒ/2.0 aperture, optical image stabilization, BSI; 1080p video recording
- Front camera: 4 MP, UltraPixel fixed-focus camera, ƒ/2.0 aperture 1080p video recording
- Display: 5.0 in (130 mm) Super AMOLED; 1920 x 1080 pixels (16:9 Aspect ratio) (440 ppi); 2.5D Corning Gorilla Glass 4.0
- Connectivity: List: Wi-Fi 802.11a/b/g/n/ac (2.4/5GHz); Wi-Fi Direct; Wi-Fi hotspot; Infrared; DLNA; GPS/GLONASS; NFC; Bluetooth; USB (Micro-B port, USB charging); MHL; USB OTG; 3.5 millimetres (0.14 in) headphone jack
- Data inputs: List: Accelerometer; Gesture sensor; Gyroscope; fingerprint sensor
- Model: A9
- Codename: Aero

The HTC One A9 is an Android-based smartphone manufactured and marketed by HTC. It was officially announced on October 20, 2015. It is the successor to the HTC One Mini 2 worldwide; but in global markets, it was sold alongside the One M9 as a mid-range offering. It was launched as an effort to improve the revenue of HTC's smartphone business after the failure of the One M9.

It features a unibody aluminum frame with a Super AMOLED HD display and Dolby Surround sound for headphones. It also features a fingerprint sensor which can be used to unlock the phone. It is the first non-Nexus device to be pre-installed with Android Marshmallow and the first non-CDMA phone that is compatible to work with the Verizon network in the United States.

It received mixed reviews following its release. While many critics lent specific praise to its construction and fingerprint scanner, other aspects have generally received indifferent or mixed reception. Some thought that its price point was too high, while others thought it was a clone of the iPhone 6. In November 2015, HTC reported a 15 percent increase in overall revenue.

== Development ==
Following the launch of the One M9, the manufacturer saw a decline of nearly 40 percent of their revenue due to the poor sales of the M9. This was because of an overheating issue caused by the Snapdragon 810 chipset, which forced the manufacturer to throttle the processor and the poor performance of the camera. This led the manufacturer to reduce its component order by 30 percent. HTC has reported further loss of revenue in the first and second quarter, and they have also mentioned that they closed some of their manufacturing facilities due to poor sales and outsourced some of their manufacturing. In June, the CEO of HTC, Cher Wang, confirmed that it was developing a "hero product" which was planned to launch in October intended to improve its smartphone business.

Rumors surrounding the development of the phone began to surface in July 2015 after the failure of the One M9. It was reported by evleaks that the device will feature a metal unibody, a five-inch screen, and a fingerprint sensor. The internal specifications of the phone was speculated through an unofficial AnTuTu benchmark test report. Several leaked images of the device began to surface which showed its similarities with the iPhone 6.

In October 2015, HTC began to release a teaser video to promote the launch event of the device on its official Twitter account. On 20 October 2015, the phone was unveiled online in a virtual event held by HTC.

== Specifications ==
=== Hardware ===
Similar to the One M8, the phone is constructed of a unibody aluminum frame with brushed metal backing. The device weighs 143 g (5.0 oz). It is 145.75 mm (5.738 in) tall, 70.8 mm (2.79 in) wide, and 7.26 mm (0.286 in) thick. The display of the device is 5.0 in (130 mm) Super AMOLED with a resolution of 1920 x 1080 pixels and pixel density of 440 ppi.

The device features an octa-core Qualcomm Snapdragon 617 system-on-chip. There are two configurations offered: 16 GB of capacity with 2 GB LPDDR4 RAM and 32 GB of capacity with 3 GB RAM. Both configurations can support storage expansion by microSD card up to 2 TB.

HTC emphasized the device's camera due to criticism of the camera of its older phones. The HTC One A9 is equipped with a 13.0-megapixel BSI rear-facing camera along with optical image stabilization, ƒ/2.0 aperture and dual-LED tone flash. Similar to One M9, the front facing camera has an UltraPixel image sensor, designed to work well in low-light environments. The camera offers a pro-mode where the user can adjust the ISO, shutter speed and the white balance the camera is also capable of capturing images in RAW format. The rear and front cameras can record videos at 1080p.

The device also features a fingerprint sensor integrated with the home button which can be used to unlock the phone. It also adds support with NFC but however it is restricted to be only used with Android Pay, which is a digital wallet platform developed by Google to power in-app and tap-to-pay purchases on mobile devices.

The phone is available in opal silver, deep garnet, topaz gold and carbon grey color finishes. In January 2016, HTC launched the device in pink color variant for sale in Taiwan.

=== Software ===
The device is pre-installed with a customized version of Android 6.0 Marshmallow along with a lighter version of the Sense 7 as the user interface utilizing stock android experience which is known as Sense 7G. Unlike the Sense 6 and 7 used on other devices, the Sense 7G utilizes the material design as the default color scheme, the stock notification and recent apps menu are used instead of the HTC's own design of notification and recent apps menu. The color schemes, icons, sounds, and fonts throughout the operating system can be customized by using HTC Themes where the users can create their own themes or download additional themes. It is also the first non-Nexus device to come pre-installed with Android Marshmallow.

Pre-loaded applications on the A9 provide access to Google's various services, including Google Play, which can be used to download and purchase apps, music, movies, and e-books. The phone also features HTC's software suite such as BlinkFeed, Gallery which supports to display and edit images in RAW format and Zoe which allows users to collaborate on highlight reels but it no longer features the HTC's Music app and instead comes pre-installed with Google Play Music. The phone utilizes the Marshmallow features such as Google Now on Tap which allows users to perform searches within the context of information currently being displayed in an app, a new power management system that reduces background activity when a device is not being physically handled which is known as "Doze", native support for fingerprint recognition and the ability to migrate data to a microSD card and use it as primary storage, as well as other internal changes.

HTC has committed to provide software updates for the unlocked variant of the phone within 15 days after the software update for the Nexus devices released by Google.^{[a]} They have also mentioned that the users of the unlocked variant of the device can unlock the bootloader without voiding the warranty of the phone.

In December 2015, HTC released a maintenance update for the unlocked variant which updates the phone to Android Marshmallow 6.0.1

The Android 7.0 Nougat began rolling out to the unlocked HTC One A9 on January 16, 2017.

=== Sound ===
Unlike the One M9, the phone does not feature the "Boomsound" stereo front facing speakers but instead it utilizes a mono speaker located on the bottom of the device. The phone features Dolby Surround sound for headphones and it can also play high-resolution audio. It is installed with a digital-to-analog converter (DAC) which upscale the audio from 16 bits to 24 bits.

=== Network ===
The unlocked variant of the A9 is the first non-CDMA phone that is compatible to work with the Verizon networks which was enabled by a software update. HTC has explained that the phone connected to Verizon's network relies on the phone's LTE radio for making phone calls and sending SMS and MMS, which became possible through the advancement of VoLTE. However, the communication capabilities cannot work if there is no LTE coverage.

== Variants ==
Model	FCC ID	Regions	CDMA bands	GSM bands	UMTS bands	LTE bands	References
2PQ9100	NM82PQ9100	International	—N/a	850/900/1800/1900 MHz	850/900/1900/2100 MHz	FDD: 1,3,5,7,8,20,28; TDD: 38,40,41	
2PQ9120	NM82PQ9120	Unlocked, AT&T, T-Mobile and Verizon (North America)	—N/a	850/900/1800/1900 MHz	850/1700(AWS)/1900/2100 MHz	FDD: 2,3,4,5,7,12,13,17,19	
2PQ9300	NM82PQ9300	Sprint (North America)	BC0/BC1/BC10	850/900/1800/1900 MHz	850/1700(AWS)/1900/2100 MHz	FDD: 2,4,5,12,25,26; TDD:41	

== Reception ==
The phone has received mixed reviews by critics, although more favorable than the One M9. Its construction, fingerprint scanner, and software received particular praise; some critics noted the camera as an improvement over other HTC phones. Chris Velazco of Engadget said that it was "not the winner this company [HTC] needs", but it praised it for coming with Android 6.0. Andrew Hoyle of CNET said that it "is just fine for a midrange device". Ajay Kumar of PC Magazine praised its construction, describing it as "impeccable".

Some critics thought that the phone was overpriced for its feature set. It was also criticized for looking similar to the iPhone 6. Vlad Savov of The Verge was mixed on the phone overall, praising its emphasis on audio and display; but described it as a "blasphemous concoction of Apple design and Google software."

=== Sales ===
The phone was launched in the United States in November on all major carriers^{[b]} which are sold as an unlocked device. At launch, the device for Verizon was delayed due to compatibility issues and was launched in December 2015. In India, the phone was announced in November and launched in December.

Following the launch of the device, HTC reported a rise of revenue for November which is six months high for the company and 15% increase of the revenue for October.
