= HTC One series =

Series of smartphones produced by HTC

- Developer: HTC
- Type: Smartphones
- Operating system: Android and Windows Phone
- Successor: HTC U Series

HTC One is a series of Android and Windows Phone smartphones designed and manufactured by HTC. All products in the One series were designed to be touchscreen-based and slate-sized, and to initially run the Android mobile operating system (Android 4.0 Ice Cream Sandwich or subsequent Android releases) with the HTC Sense graphical user interface. The one exception to this is the HTC One (M8), which also had a Windows Phone variant. From 2010 to 2013, all HTC products starting from the HTC Sensation XE to the HTC One Mini were equipped with a Beats Audio equalizer. Later HTC devices beginning with the HTC One Max no longer ship with Beats Audio following the buyback of HTC's stake in Beats Electronics.

== Phones ==
=== 2012 lineup ===
While critically acclaimed, the 2012 One series had not received much consumer attention and sales were disappointing. For one, HTC has been outspent on marketing by Samsung and Apple, as HTC instead had relied heavily on carriers to promote its products. Also, while HTC made many carrier-specific devices, Samsung and Apple were able to concentrate their resources on single flagship handsets such as the Samsung Galaxy S III and iPhone 4S to attract the attention of the consumers. Lastly, while HTC handsets were seen as better quality than Samsung's plastic devices, Samsung was able to successfully distinguish itself from other Android manufacturers with manufacturer-specific software tweaks (as well as marketing to promote its brand) while HTC could not.

The "One" devices released in 2012 consist of the following, with devices in similar price segments usually sold by different carriers:

- HTC One V, a low-end smartphone
- HTC One S, a mid-range smartphone
  - The Japanese variant, HTC J, many of the same specifications as the One S, but has a larger battery and runs on WiMAX
- HTC One X, a high-end smartphone
  - An LTE variant of the HTC One X with the same name is sold in North America, with a 1.5 GHz dual-core Qualcomm Snapdragon S4 MSM8960 processor instead of the quad core Nvidia Tegra
  - HTC One X+ a refresh of the One X which has a faster clocked Tegra 3 processor, larger battery and more memory than the HTC One X
  - HTC Evo 4G LTE, a North American variant similar to the LTE One X, but with added features including a MicroSD slot and kickstand, exclusive to Sprint Nextel

=== 2013 lineup ===
The 2013 One series was reduced to focus on only three versions of one main design. Three devices had been announced as of October 2013: the HTC One (M7) in February 2013, the One Mini in July 2013, and the One Max in October 2013. Following the previous year's setbacks, the HTC One was critically acclaimed for its design, and was commercially successful.

- HTC One (M7), the HTC One X's successor. It won the "Best New Mobile Handset, Device or Tablet" at Mobile World Congress 2013
- HTC One Mini, the smaller variant of the HTC One with a 4.3-inch screen
- HTC One Max, the larger variant of the HTC One with a 5.9-inch screen and a fingerprint scanner
- HTC Butterfly S, successor to the original Butterfly with a 3200 mAh battery

=== 2014 lineup ===
- HTC One (M8), the successor to the 2013 HTC One (M7). There are two versions of this device: one running Android 4.4.2 KitKat and another running Windows Phone 8.1.
- HTC One Mini 2, the HTC One Mini's successor
- HTC One (E8), a lower-cost variant of the One (M8) with similar specs but a polycarbonate body and a single 13-megapixel camera
- HTC Butterfly 2, is a variant of the One (M8) with similar specs encased in a polycarbonate body. It is water resistant, and has a dual rear camera (13-megapixel main camera and 2-megapixel secondary camera)

=== 2015 lineup ===
- HTC One M9, the 2014 HTC One (M8)'s successor.
- HTC One M9+, an upscaled version of the HTC One M9
- HTC One M9+ Supreme Camera Edition, a phone similar to the HTC One M9+ but with a better camera
- HTC One ME
- HTC One E9
- HTC One E9+
- HTC One M8s, a mid-range smartphone that is similar to the HTC One M8
- HTC One M9s, a variant of the HTC One M9 with a weaker processor, less internal storage, less RAM, and a weaker rear camera.
- HTC One A9, launched on October 20. The One A9 is the first non-Nexus device launched with Android 6.0 Marshmallow.

=== 2016 lineup ===
- HTC One A9s, the successor to the One A9 from 2015, was unveiled on 1 September 2016.
- HTC 10

== Succession ==
The last flagship phone in the HTC One series was the HTC One M9, which was announced and released in 2015. Its successor, the HTC 10, is HTC's 2016 flagship phone; however, it did not use the "One" branding in the name. Its successor, the 2017 HTC U11, did not use the "One" branding either.

== Comparison ==
This table is primarily intended to show the differences between the models of the One series:

	HTC One V	HTC One SV	HTC One S	HTC One S (Snapdragon S3)	HTC One X	HTC One X (North America)	HTC One XL	HTC One X+	HTC One (2013)	HTC One Mini	HTC One Max	HTC One (M8)	HTC One Mini 2
Dimensions	H 120.30 mm (4.74 in); W 59.70 mm (2.35 in); D 9.24 mm (0.36 in)	H 128 mm (5.04 in); W 66.9 mm (2.63 in); D 9.2 mm (0.36 in)	H 130.9 mm (5.15 in); W 65.0 mm (2.56 in); D 7.8 mm (0.31 in) { D 8.9 mm (0.35 in) for bump area}		H 134.36 mm (5.29 in); W 69.9 mm (2.75 in); D 8.9 mm (0.35 in)	H 134.8 mm (5.31 in); W 69.9 mm (2.75 in); D 8.9 mm (0.35 in)		H 134.4 mm (5.29 in); W 69.9 mm (2.75 in); D 8.9 mm (0.35 in)	H 137.4 mm (5.41 in); W 68.2 mm (2.69 in); D (max) 9.3 mm (0.37 in); D (min) 4 mm (0.16 in)	H 132 mm (5.20 in); W 63.2 mm (2.49 in); D 9.3 mm (0.37 in)	164.5 mm (6.48 in) H 82.5 mm (3.25 in) W 10.3 mm (0.41 in) D	H 146.4 mm (5.76 in); W 70.6 mm (2.78 in); D 9.4 mm (0.37 in) 7	H 137.4 mm (5.41 in); W 65 mm (2.56 in); D 10.6 mm (0.42 in)
Weight	115 grams with battery	122 grams with battery	119.5 grams with battery		130 grams with battery			135 grams with battery	143 grams with battery	122 grams with battery	217 grams with battery	160 grams with battery	137 grams with battery
Operating System (OS)	Android 4.0 (Ice Cream Sandwich)	Android 4.0 (Ice Cream Sandwich), Android 4.1.1 (Jelly Bean), Upgradeable to Android 4.2.2 (Jelly Bean)	Android 4.0 (Ice Cream Sandwich), Upgradeable to Android 4.1.1 (Jelly Bean)		Android 4.0 (Ice Cream Sandwich), Android 4.1.1 (Jelly Bean), Upgradeable to Android 4.2.2 (Jelly Bean)				Android 4.1.2 (Jelly Bean), Android 4.2.2 (Jelly Bean), Android 4.3 (Jelly Bean), Upgradeable to Android 5.0 (Lollipop)	Android 4.2.2 (Jelly Bean), Android 4.3 (Jelly Bean), Upgradeable to Android 4.4.2 (KitKat)	Android 4.3 (Jelly Bean), Upgradeable to Android 5.0 (Lollipop)	Android 4.4.2 (KitKat), upgradeable to Android 6.0 (Marshmallow); Windows Phone 8.1 Update 1	Android 4.4.2 (KitKat)
HTC Sense Version	4.0 (Android 4.0)	4.0 (Android 4.0), 4+ (Android 4.1.1), 5.0 (Android 4.2.2)	4.0 (Android 4.0), 4+ (Android 4.1.1)		4.0 (Android 4.0), 4+ (Android 4.1.1), 5.0 (Android 4.2.2)				5.0 (Android 4.1.2 & Android 4.2.2), 5.5 (Android 4.3 & Android 4.4.2)	5.0 (Android 4.2.2), 5.5 (Android 4.3 & Android 4.4.2)	5.5 (Android 4.3 & Android 4.4.2)	6.0 (Android 4.4.2); N/A (Windows Phone 8.1 Update 1)	6.0 (Android 4.4.2)
Display	3.7-inch WVGA (480×800) LCD	4.3-inch WVGA (480×800) Super LCD 2 with RGB matrix. Corning Gorilla Glass 2.0 217 ppi	4.3-inch qHD (540×960) Super AMOLED with RGBG-matrix (PenTile)		4.7-inch 720p (720×1280) LCD IPS panel with RGB-matrix			4.7-inch 720p (720×1280) Super LCD 2. Corning Gorilla Glass 2.0 312 ppi	4.7-inch 1080p (1080×1920) Super LCD 3 with RGB matrix. Corning Gorilla Glass 2.0 468 ppi	4.3-inch 720p (720×1280) Super LCD 2 with RGB matrix. Corning Gorilla Glass 3.0 341 ppi	5.9-inch 1080p (1080×1920) Super LCD 3 with RGB matrix. Corning Gorilla Glass 3.0 367 ppi	5.0-inch 1080p (1080×1920) Super LCD 3 with RGB matrix. Corning Gorilla Glass 3.0 441 ppi	4.5-inch 720p (720×1280) Super LCD 2 with RGB matrix. Corning Gorilla Glass 3.0 326 ppi
SoC	Qualcomm Snapdragon S2 MSM8255	Qualcomm Snapdragon S4 MSM8930	Qualcomm Snapdragon S4 MSM8260A	Qualcomm Snapdragon S3 MSM8260	Nvidia Tegra 3	Qualcomm Snapdragon S4 MSM8960		Nvidia Tegra 3 (AP37)	Qualcomm Snapdragon 600 APQ8064	Qualcomm Snapdragon 400 MSM8930AA	Qualcomm Snapdragon 600 APQ8064	Qualcomm Snapdragon 801 MSM8974-AB (International)/MSM8974-AC (Asia)	Qualcomm Snapdragon 400 MSM8926
CPU	1 GHz single-core Qualcomm Scorpion	1.2 GHz dual core Qualcomm Krait	1.5 GHz dual-core Qualcomm Krait	1.7 GHz dual-core Qualcomm Scorpion (Modified performance up to Snapdragon S4)	1.5 GHz quad-core ARM Cortex-A9	1.5 GHz dual-core Qualcomm Krait		1.7 GHz quad-core ARM Cortex-A9	1.7 GHz quad-core Qualcomm Krait 300	1.4 GHz dual-core Qualcomm Krait 300	1.7 GHz quad-core Qualcomm Krait 300	2.3 GHz (International)/ 2.5 GHz (Asia) quad-core Qualcomm Krait 400	1.2 GHz quad-core ARM Cortex-A7
GPU	Qualcomm Adreno 205	Qualcomm Adreno 305	Qualcomm Adreno 225 (400 MHz)	Qualcomm Adreno 220 (266 MHz)	Nvidia ULP GeForce (520 MHz)	Qualcomm Adreno 225		Nvidia ULP GeForce 2 (12-Core GPU)	Qualcomm Adreno 320	Qualcomm Adreno 305	Qualcomm Adreno 320	Qualcomm Adreno 330	Qualcomm Adreno 305
RAM	512 MB	1 GB							2 GB DDR3	1 GB	2 GB DDR2	2 GB DDR2	1 GB
Storage	4 GB; Expansion slot: microSD memory card (SD 2.0 compatible)	8 GB; Expansion slot: microSD memory card up to 32 GB	16 GB		16 or 32 GB	16 GB	16 or 32 GB	32 or 64 GB	32 or 64 GB	16 GB	32 GB; Expansion slot: microSD memory card up to 64 GB (SD 2.0 compatible)	16 or 32 GB; Expansion slot: microSD memory card up to 128 GB	16 GB; Expansion slot: microSD memory card up to 128 GB
2G GSM/GPRS/EDGE	850/900/1800/1900 MHz												
3G WCDMA/HSPA	850/900/1900/2100 MHz										850/900/2100 MHz (adds 1700 MHz in US)	850/900/1900/2100 MHz	
4G LTE	X mark	Yes	X mark		X mark	700/1700/2100 MHz	1800/2600 MHz	Category 3 (North America Only)	Yes (except 801e)	Yes (except 601e)	700 Class 13/800/850/900/1800/1900/2100/2600 MHz	Yes	Yes
Sensors	Proximity, Ambient Light and Accelerometer	Proximity, Ambient Light, Accelerometer, Gyro and Digital compass									Proximity, Ambient Light, Accelerometer, Gyro, Digital compass, Fingerprint scanner	Proximity, Ambient Light, Accelerometer, Gyro and Digital compass	
Connectivity	Wi-Fi: 802.11b/g/n, Wi-Fi hotspot Bluetooth 4.0 Smart Ready; Standard 5-pin micro USB 2.0	Wi-Fi: 802.11a/b/g/n, Wi-Fi hotspot DLNA; NFC; Bluetooth 4.0 Smart Ready; Standard 5-pin micro USB 2.0 (Via MHL); HDMI support	Wi-Fi: 802.11b/g/n, Wi-Fi hotspot DLNA; Bluetooth 4.0 Smart Ready; Standard 5-pin micro USB 2.0 (Via MHL); HDMI support		Wi-Fi: 802.11a/b/g/n, Wi-Fi hotspot DLNA; Wi-Fi Direct; NFC; Bluetooth 4.0 Smart Ready; Standard 5-pin micro USB 2.0 (Via MHL); HDMI support				Wi-Fi: 802.11a/b/g/n/ac, Wi-Fi hotspot DLNA; Wi-Fi Direct; NFC; Infrared; Bluetooth 4.0 Smart Ready; Standard 5-pin micro USB 2.0 (Via MHL); HDMI support	Wi-Fi: 802.11a/b/g/n, Wi-Fi hotspot DLNA; Bluetooth 4.0; Standard 5-pin micro USB 2.0 (Via MHL)	Wi-Fi: 802.11a/b/g/n/ac, Wi-Fi hotspot DLNA; Wi-Fi Direct; NFC; Infrared; Bluetooth 4.0 Smart Ready; Standard 5-pin micro USB 2.0 (Via MHL); HDMI support		Wi-Fi: 802.11a/b/g/n, Wi-Fi hotspot DLNA; Wi-Fi Direct; NFC; Bluetooth 4.0 Smart Ready; Standard 5-pin micro USB 2.0 (Via MHL); HDMI support
Camera	5 MP; 720p HD video recording No front camera	5 MP; 1080p HD video recording 1.6 MP (with 720p video recording)	8 MP; 1080p HD video recording VGA front camera		8 MP; 1080p HD video recording 1.3 MP (with 720p video recording)			8 MP, 3264 × 2448 pixels, autofocus, LED flash 1080p video recording 1.6 MP, 720p HD Video recording	4 MP, 2.0 μm camera with auto focus, smart LED flash, BSI sensor, F2.0 aperture, 28 mm lens, dedicated imaging chip 2, continuous shooting, optical image stabilization 1080p HD video recording, video stabilization, slow motion video capture (768 × 432 pixels), HDR video recording.	4 MP, 2.0 μm camera with auto focus, smart LED flash, BSI sensor, F2.0 aperture, 28 mm lens, dedicated imaging chip 2, continuous shooting 1080p HD video recording, video stabilization, slow motion video capture (768 × 432 pixels), HDR video recording	4 MP, 2.0 μm camera with auto focus, smart LED flash, BSI sensor, F2.0 aperture, 28 mm lens, dedicated imaging chip 2, continuous shooting, digital image stabilization. 1080×1920 (1080p HD) (30 fps), 1280x720 (720p HD) (60 fps) video recording, video stabilization, slow motion video capture, HDR video recording,	4 MP, 2.0 μm camera with auto focus, smart LED flash, BSI sensor, F2.0 aperture, 28 mm lens, dedicated imaging chip 2, continuous shooting, digital image stabilization. 1080×1920 (1080p HD) (30 fps), 1280×720 (720p HD) (60 fps) video recording, video stabilization, slow motion video capture, HDR video recording. Second 2 MP depth of field sensor, smart stabilization,	13 MP, 4128 × 3096 pixels, autofocus, LED flash 1080p video recording 5 MP, 1080p video recording
Battery	1500 mAh	1800 mAh	1650 mAh		1800 mAh			2100 mAh	2300 mAh	1800 mAh	3300 mAh	2600 mAh	2110 mAh

== See also ==
- HTC U series
