= HTC One M9 =

Android smartphone manufactured by HTC

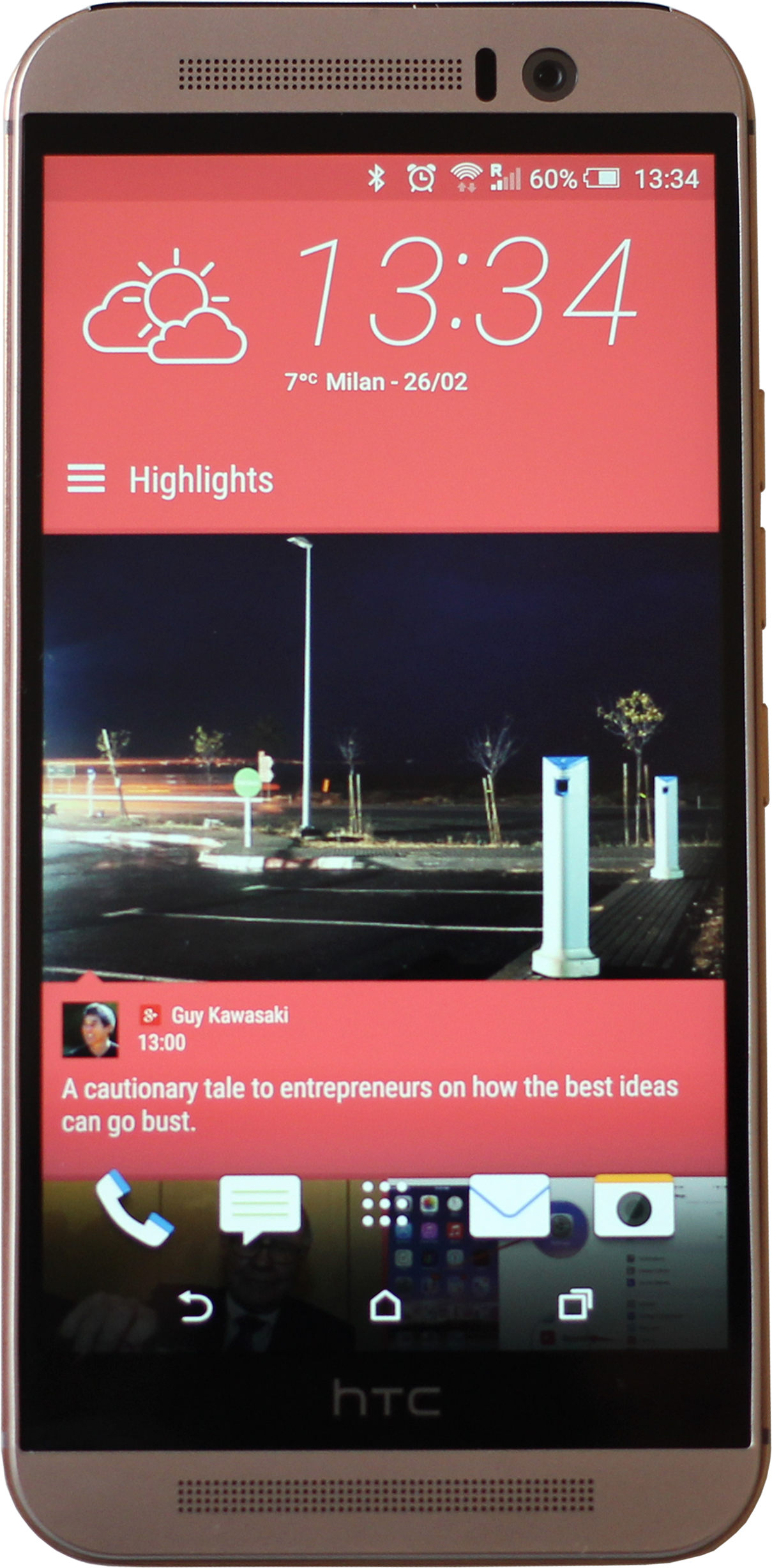
- Manufacturer: HTC
- Type: Smartphone
- Series: HTC One series
- First released: April 10, 2015; 11 years ago
- Predecessor: HTC One (M8)
- Successor: HTC 10
- Related: HTC One M9+
- Form factor: Slate
- Dimensions: 144.6 mm (5.69 in) H 69.7 mm (2.74 in) W 9.61 mm (0.378 in) D
- Weight: 157 g (5.5 oz)
- Operating system: Original: Android 5.0.2 "Lollipop"; Current: Android 7.0 "Nougat"; Unofficial: Android 11 via LineageOS 18.1
- System-on-chip: Qualcomm Snapdragon 810
- CPU: Quad-core ARM Cortex A57 and quad-core A53 (64-bit support)
- GPU: Adreno 430
- Memory: 3 GB LPDDR4 RAM
- Storage: 32 GB
- Removable storage: microSD up to 2 TB
- Battery: 2,840 mAh Li-Po
- Rear camera: 20-megapixel camera, Auto Focus, Toshiba T4AK7 BSI CMOS Sensor, Dual-LED dual tone flash, f/2.2 aperture, 27.8 mm lens
- Front camera: 4-megapixel UltraPixel camera, f/2.0 aperture
- Display: 5.0 in (130 mm) Super LCD 3 with RGB matrix 1920 x 1080 pixels (16:9 Aspect ratio) (441 ppi); Corning Gorilla Glass 4.0; Glove mode option for high touch sensitivity
- Data inputs: List: Accelerometer; Gesture sensor; Gyroscope
- Model: M9
- Codename: Hima
- Website: www.htc.com/us/smartphones/htc-one-m9/

The HTC One M9 is an Android-based smartphone manufactured and marketed by HTC. The M9 was officially unveiled in a press conference at Mobile World Congress on March 1, 2015, and it was released worldwide on April 10, 2015. It is the successor to HTC One (M8).

== Specifications ==
=== Exterior ===
The design of the M9 is similar to its predecessor, except that it is slightly narrower and thicker. The device has IPX3-level protection against spraying water. The HTC pro case, available separately, offers IP68-level water and dust protection, and a shockproof rating for up to a two-meter drop.

=== Chipsets ===
The phone features an octa-core Qualcomm Snapdragon 810 system-on-chip with 3 GB of RAM, a 5-inch 1080p display, and 32 GB of internal storage (nearly 9 GB is reserved for the operating system). Storage can be expanded with a Micro SD card up to 2 TB.

=== Cameras ===
The UltraPixel image sensor (which had larger pixels in its sensor, but sacrificed megapixel size for enhanced low-light capabilities) was moved to the front-facing camera, with the rear-facing camera now using a more traditional 20 megapixel sensor, supporting 4K (2160p) video recording. The M8's depth sensor was also dropped.

2160p videos are limited to six minutes per recording, after which the recording must be restarted.

=== Speakers ===
Speakers have been a prominent feature of the HTC One M series since the M7.

M9's front-facing "BoomSound" stereo speakers use Dolby Audio tuning.

=== Video ===
The phone can redirect the screen to a screen with an HDMI type A connector by using its micro-USB 2.0 (MHL 2 TV-out) to HDMI.

=== Miscellaneous ===
The built-in infrared (IR) sensor can make the device a remote control for other infrared-enabled gadgets.

=== Software ===
The M9 runs Android Lollipop with HTC's Sense 7 user interface and software suite. HTC updated the M9 to Android Marshmallow following its release, and subsequently updated the device to Android Nougat in December 2016.

== Reception ==
=== Pre-release ===
Vlad Savov from The Verge described the M9 as "the world’s most beautiful disappointment," noting that it was merely an evolution of the M8 with limited design changes, and that its rear/primary camera was of low quality, concluding that "remixing the past is not a sign of innovation, and neither is the addition of a fast new processor just because it’s fast and new, or multiplying the megapixels of a camera that’s still not good enough."

Due to HTC releasing a last-minute software update, Joshue Ho of AnandTech reviewed the phone in two parts. In the first part, he tested battery life, stating "the M9 posts a result that is a concerning regression from the M8" and that "battery life regresses around 18% when the battery is now 9% bigger." He also noted temperature concerns during web browsing, stating "the M9 start to get warm in the hands, with skin temperatures of around 30 to 40 degrees Celsius, which is a bit concerning as I don’t recall the same being true for the M8." Additionally, the phone supports Qualcomm's Quick Charge 2.0, however, "the charger in the box is a rather conventional 5V, 1.5A adapter which doesn’t take advantage of Qualcomm’s QC 2.0 spec." On battery life, he concluded that "the One M9 is simply less mobile than the One M8 in a significant way, which is disappointing to say the least." On the display, he wrote that "the display has worse viewing angles than the M7 and M8." As far as color accuracy, he wrote that "on...grayscale calibration, we can see a dramatic reduction in accuracy when compared to the M7 and M8." He concluded that "it would be difficult to use the M9 in any case where color accuracy is needed" and that "the lack of improvement or regression in every other metric suggests that HTC has gone backwards in display quality." He also observed heavy thermal throttling of the new Snapdragon 810 SOC, stating that "it’s basically impossible to get the A57 cluster beyond 1.5 to 1.6 GHz" and that "a single thread will eventually cause the A57 cluster to clock around 1 to 1.2 GHz."

=== Post-release ===
For the second part of the AnandTech review, Ho further evaluates battery life and performance, stating that "simple logging shows that past the first 20 minutes the A57 cluster is either shut down or throttled to the minimum clock state" and that "the level of throttling I’ve seen here is pretty much unprecedented, which doesn’t help with the issue. Overall, the performance of Snapdragon 810 here is bad enough that I would genuinely consider Snapdragon 805 to be an improvement." He evaluated the speed of the camera, stating that "the camera preview has a relatively low frame rate and resolution" and that "the One M9 has a pretty stunning regression in autofocus speed and overall capture latency when compared to the One M8." On daylight photo quality, he states that "HTC needs to strongly reduce the noise reduction that they're using here, as there's almost no detail in these photos" and on night photo quality he states that "the One M9 performs horribly. There's really not much else to be said because there's next to no detail in these photos." As for video recording, he found that "the One M9 still has a noticeable lack of detail and there are a lot of problems with camera shake that aren't dampened out. It almost looks like HTC doesn't have any kind of stabilization for video here, which is rather disappointing." He concluded his review, by stating that "the One M9 is effectively a side-grade of the One M8 at best" and that "given that the One M8 is at least 200 dollars cheaper than the One M9 on contract, I find it incredibly difficult to recommend the One M9."

Engadget noted that the M9's speakers showed regressions over the M8, arguing that "the M8 usually did a better job of reproducing classic tunes than its successor. Most times, the M8 was a touch louder and shined a little more light on the primary vocal track in the mix; meanwhile, the M9 projected a soundscape that drew me in a little more thanks to cleaner channel separation, but seemed softer in comparison." Similarly, the M9's camera was also found to have inconsistent performance over the M8, explaining that "sometimes the M9 comes through with crisper details; other times the M8 seems to do a better job. Sometimes the M9 has richer, more accurately exposed colors; sometimes it doesn't." In a battery test in which a video was looped non-stop at a brightness level of 50%, the M9's result of eight hours and nineteen minutes fell in between the results of the 2013 and 2014 models.

Ron Amadeo reviewed the One M9 for Ars Technica. He opened by stating that "[t]he Snapdragon 810 SoC—meant to give the M9 a speed boost over the M8—has been throttled so much that the M9 is at best equal to the M8, and in some cases slower." He also noticed heavy thermal throttling, commenting that "[t]he 810 in the M9 was slated to run at 2GHz, but it almost never runs at that speed. It seems to be capped at 1.6 GHz." The only advantage that the M9's Snapdragon 810 SoC had over the M8's Snapdragon 801 SoC was in gaming. As far as temperature, he wrote that "the rumors of the 810s heat issues seem based in reality" and that "HTC is butting right up against the acceptable heat level." After testing the battery, he stated that "the battery life is poor. It only lasted six hours and 15 minutes in our test." He concluded that "this phone stands no chance against the tougher-than-ever competition." As one of the first phones released in 2015 to use the Snapdragon 810, Ars Technica noted that HTC was the least prepared of the OEMs in coping with the Snapdragon 810's overheating issues when using the initial release of that chip, missing out on later revisions of the 810 that somewhat addressed those problems.

The M9's photo quality was rated as mediocre, which several reviewers considered as a serious flaw due to "how fundamental the camera is to the iPhone’s popularity, and any other company wishing to have a successful smartphone must start with a strong imaging foundation." Ars Technica's Amadeo criticized the M9's rear-facing (primary) camera for the inconsistent quality of its images compared to 2014-15 rival smartphones. The M9's rear camera module has a narrower aperture than the M7 and M8, while also lacking optical image stabilization (OIS) that was found in preceding HTC One (M7) (OIS was removed for the M8 due to the Duo Camera feature). The M9's rear camera image sensor also has smaller pixels which sacrificed enhanced low-light capabilities for a higher megapixel count, compared to the M7 and M8's UltraPixel's larger sensor size and lower megapixel count. The M9's secondary/front camera for selfies with its UltraPixel sensor did perform well for its intended purpose.

David Ruddock reviewed the phone for Android Police. He examined the display and concluded that while the One M9 had decent color reproduction, good brightness, and satisfactory viewing angles, it was clear that competitors like Samsung and Apple had surpassed HTC in this area. He found the battery life to be disappointingly mediocre, noting that it was a step back from the M8. He moved on to the rear/primary camera, describing it as "a bit of a mess on the One M9." He found that "the focus never, ever seems right" and that "there is going to be brutal processing noise and artifacting in anything but daylight." The camera launch time also regressed; "The launch time for the camera is also lamentable, at anywhere from 1-4 seconds depending on how the phone is feeling, I guess." In conclusion, he described the camera as the most mediocre seen on a high-end smartphone in the past year, lacking any real redeeming qualities, and unable to compete with the flagship phones of 2014. He also found evidence of thermal throttling, stating that "its high-speed A57 quad-core cluster, you'll never see it get over 1.5-1.6GHz in regular usage for more than sub-second bursts." As for overall performance, he found that "it's not really even appreciable quicker than the One M8, and in some cases, I actually noticed it to be slower." He concluded that "[t]he M9 brings nothing truly compelling to the table that the M7 and M8 before it did not."

== HTC One M9s ==
The M9s model is similar to the One M9, but with downgraded specs. It has half the storage of the M9, a 13MP camera, and a MediaTek Helio X10 to compensate for the Snapdragon 810's overheating issues.

== See also ==
Preceded by HTC One (M8)	HTC One series 2015	Succeeded by HTC 10
