= HTC One Mini =

Android smartphone by HTC

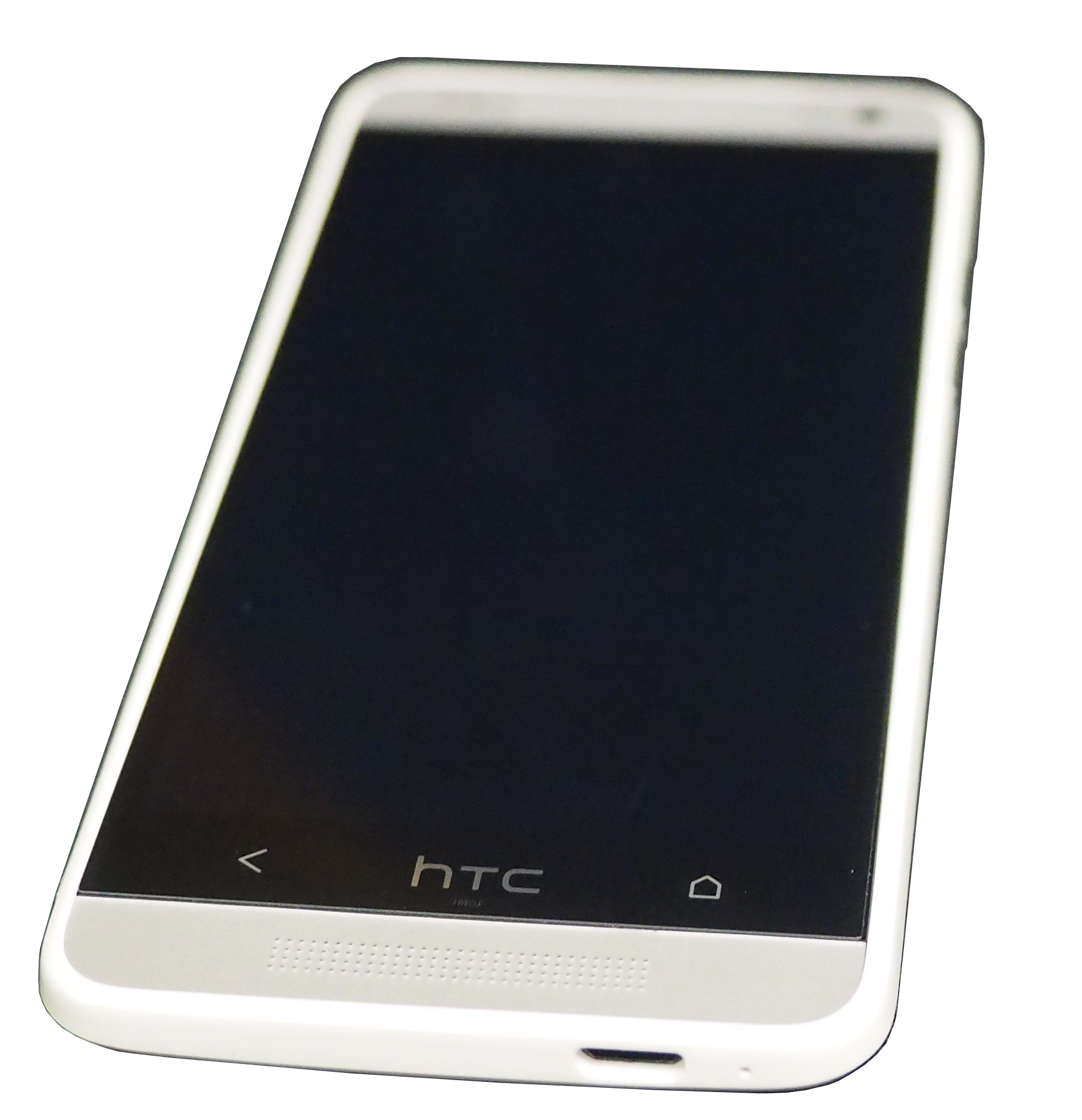
- Manufacturer: HTC
- Type: Smartphone
- Series: HTC One
- First released: August 2013
- Predecessor: HTC One S
- Successor: HTC One Mini 2
- Related: HTC One (M7), HTC One Max, HTC First
- Form factor: Slate
- Dimensions: 132 mm (5.2 in) H 63.2 mm (2.49 in) W 9.3 mm (0.37 in) D
- Weight: 122 g (4.3 oz)
- Operating system: Android 4.4 "KitKat"
- System-on-chip: Qualcomm Snapdragon 400 MSM8930AA
- CPU: 1.4 GHz dual-core Krait 200
- GPU: Adreno 305
- Memory: 1 GB RAM
- Storage: 16 GB
- Removable storage: None
- Battery: 1,800 mAh Li-Po
- Rear camera: 4-megapixel, 2.0 μm camera with auto focus, UltraPixel BSI image sensor, smart LED flash, F2.0 aperture, 28 mm lens, dedicated imaging chip, continuous shooting 1080p HD video recording, video stabilization, slow motion video capture (768 × 432 pixels), HDR video recording
- Front camera: 1.6-megapixel front camera (720p for recording and video chat)
- Display: 4.3 in (110 mm) Super LCD 2 with RGB matrix 720×1280 pixels 16:9 Aspect ratio) (342 ppi); Corning Gorilla Glass 3.0
- Connectivity: Wi-Fi: 802.11 a/b/g/n (2.4/5 GHz); GPS & GLONASS; Bluetooth 4.0 with apt-X; DLNA; Wi-Fi Direct; Miracast; Wi-Fi Hotspot; USB 2.0 (Micro-B Port, USB charging); 3.5 millimetres (0.14 in) TRRS
- Codename: m4
- Other: Accelerometer, gyroscope, digital compass, proximity sensor, ambient light sensor

The HTC One Mini is an Android smartphone designed and manufactured by HTC. Alternatively known as the HTC M4, HTC 601e or HTC 601s, the One Mini is a mid-range variant of HTC's 2013 flagship high-end smartphone, the HTC One. As such, the One Mini was designed to provide an overall experience as similar to its high-end counterpart as possible, while still being competitively priced in comparison to other smartphones in its range. Officially unveiled on 18 July 2013, the One Mini was released in selected markets in August 2013 followed by a global release in September 2013.

== Development and release ==
With the successful launch of the HTC One, HTC made plans to extend its design and technology into a "family of devices". In particular, HTC North America's president Mike Woodward indicated that consumers had requested a smaller version of the HTC One since its launch. HTC designed the One Mini to provide "exactly the same experience" as the One with "no compromises", at a mid-range price.

In December 2013, the One Mini was banned from sale in the United Kingdom as the result of a patent infringement lawsuit by Nokia. While the HTC One was also affected by the ruling, its sales ban was stayed by the court pending an appeal; the judge indicated that banning HTC One sales would have a negative effect on the company in preparation for the release of its successor.

== Specifications ==
The HTC One Mini uses an almost identical unibody design to the HTC One, and incorporates hardware features first introduced with the HTC One, such as front-facing dual BoomSound stereo speakers and a 4-megapixel rear-facing camera with an UltraPixel image sensor. Internally, the One Mini features a 1.4 GHz dual-core Snapdragon 400 processor with 1 GB of RAM, a 4.3 inch 720p screen with a pixel density of 341 ppi, lacks an infra-red emitter and NFC, uses a smaller 1800 mAh battery, and contains 16 GB of non-expandable storage. The One Mini ships with a version of Android 4.2.2 (Jelly Bean) and HTC Sense 5.0 nearly identical to that of the HTC One. The One Mini can be updated to Android 4.4 (KitKat).

== Reception ==
Early reviews of the HTC One Mini were positive and praised HTC's adaptation of the HTC One's premium design to a smaller form factor, and also praised the One Mini's display and overall performance that was almost indistinguishable from that of its high-end counterpart. While PC Magazine experienced issues with image quality on the rear camera on a pre-production model, the One Mini was considered a good competitor to the similar Samsung Galaxy S4 Mini due to the One Mini's higher quality build and high-definition screen.

== See also ==
- HTC One series
