= HTC One X+ =

- Brand: HTC
- Manufacturer: HTC
- Type: Smartphone
- Series: HTC One series
- First released: November 13, 2012; 13 years ago
- Predecessor: HTC One X
- Successor: HTC One (M7)
- Compatible networks: GSM / HSPA / LTE
- Form factor: Slate
- Color: Stealth Black Polar White
- Dimensions: 134.4 mm (5.29 in) H 69.9 mm (2.75 in) W 8.9 mm (0.35 in) D
- Weight: 135 g (4.8 oz)
- Operating system: Android 4.1.1 (Jelly Bean) with HTC Sense UI 4
- System-on-chip: NVIDIA Tegra 3 AP37
- CPU: Quad-core 1.7 GHz
- GPU: ULP GeForce
- Memory: 1 GB RAM
- Storage: 32 GB / 64 GB
- Removable storage: No
- SIM: Micro-SIM
- Battery: Non-removable Li-Ion 2100 mAh
- Rear camera: 8 MP, AF, LED flash, 1080p video recording
- Front camera: 1.6 MP, 720p video recording
- Display: 4.7-inch Super LCD2, 720 x 1280 pixels, Corning Gorilla Glass
- References: "HTC One X+ - Full phone specifications". GSMArena.com.

The HTC One X+ is a touchscreen-based Android smartphone developed and manufacutred by HTC. Unveiled on October 2, 2012, the HTC One X+ is an upgraded variant of the original One X. The device will come with expanded storage, a larger battery, a more powerful processor, and Android 4.1 Jelly Bean.

== Specifications ==
The HTC One X+ is housed in a polycarbonate unibody measuring 134.4 x 69.9 x 8.9 mm and weighing 135 grams. The device features a 4.7-inch Super LCD2 display with a resolution of 720 x 1280 pixels, delivering a pixel density of approximately 312 ppi, protected by Corning Gorilla Glass.

The device is equipped by an Nvidia Tegra 3 AP37 system-on-chip accompanied by a 1.7 GHz quad-core CPU and a ULP GeForce GPU. It comes equipped with 1 GB of RAM and is offered in internal storage configurations of 32 GB or 64 GB, without support for external microSD expansion. The phone is powered by a non-removable 2,100 mAh Li-Ion battery.

The rear main camera employs an 8-megapixel sensor with autofocus and an LED flash, capable of recording video at 1080p resolution. The front-facing camera features a 1.6-megapixel sensor capable of 720p video recording.

The HTC One X+ shipped natively with Android 4.1.1 (Jelly Bean) overlaid with HTC's custom user interface, Sense 4. The last Android version to run on is Android 4.2.2.
