= HTC One (E8) =

Android smartphone released by HTC (2014)

The HTC One (E8) is a high-end Android smartphone released by HTC in 2014. It has been described as a cheaper version of the HTC One (M8), and the two devices share many similar features.

== Features ==
The design of the HTC One (E8) has been described as an HTC One (M8) with a plastic shell and lighter weight. The phone is available in colors Polar White, Electric Crimson, Maldives Blue, and Misty Gray. The dimensions of the phone are 146.6 by 70.6 by 9.4 mm (5.8 by 2.8 by 0.4 in) and the phone weighs 145 grams (5.1 oz). The display is a 5-inch Super LCD3 multitouch capacitive touchscreen with 1080p resolution and Corning Gorilla Glass 3 protection. The phone features a quad-core 2.5 GHz Qualcomm Snapdragon 801 processor with Adreno 330 graphics. It was originally preinstalled with Android 4.4.2 KitKat and could be upgraded up to Android 6.0.1 Marshmallow. Android 12 is unofficially available via LineageOS. The phone includes 2 GB of RAM and 16 GB of storage, which can be expanded with a microSD card slot supporting cards with a capacity of up to 128 GB. The rear camera is a 13 MP unit with autofocus and LED flash, and supports 1080p video recording at 30 fps. The front camera is a 5 MP unit. The phone supports dual-band Wi-Fi 802.11 a/b/g/n with Wi-Fi Direct, DLNA and hotspot functions, Bluetooth 4.0, GPS with A-GPS and GLONASS, and NFC. The battery is a non-removable 2600 mAh lithium polymer unit, supporting up to 504 hours of 3G standby time and up to 26 hours and 40 minutes of 3G talk time.

== Reception ==
The HTC One (E8) received generally positive reviews. The consensus among critics was that while it has similar performance and user interface as the M8, the E8 lacks any stand-out features from other 2014 Android flagships, most notably the rear camera. Aloysius Low of CNET gave the E8 a 7.3 out of 10. Good points noted in the review were that the phone included top-end hardware, a bright and vibrant display, and most of the features of the M8, and bad points were that the phone lacked the dual-camera system of the M8, and did not have any notable features compared to its competitors. Gareth Beavis of TechRadar gave the E8 a 4 out of 5, saying that the components were powerful and the user interface was impressive, but noted that the phone was slippery, the camera was too generic, and the phone was too light compared to the M8. Chris P. of PhoneArena gave the E8 an 8.7 out of 10, praising the "attractive" design, bright screen, the interface, and front-facing speakers, and criticizing the glossy finish of color versions, mediocre camera, call quality, and "blueish" screen.
