= HTC One Max =

Android phablet designed and manufactured by HTC

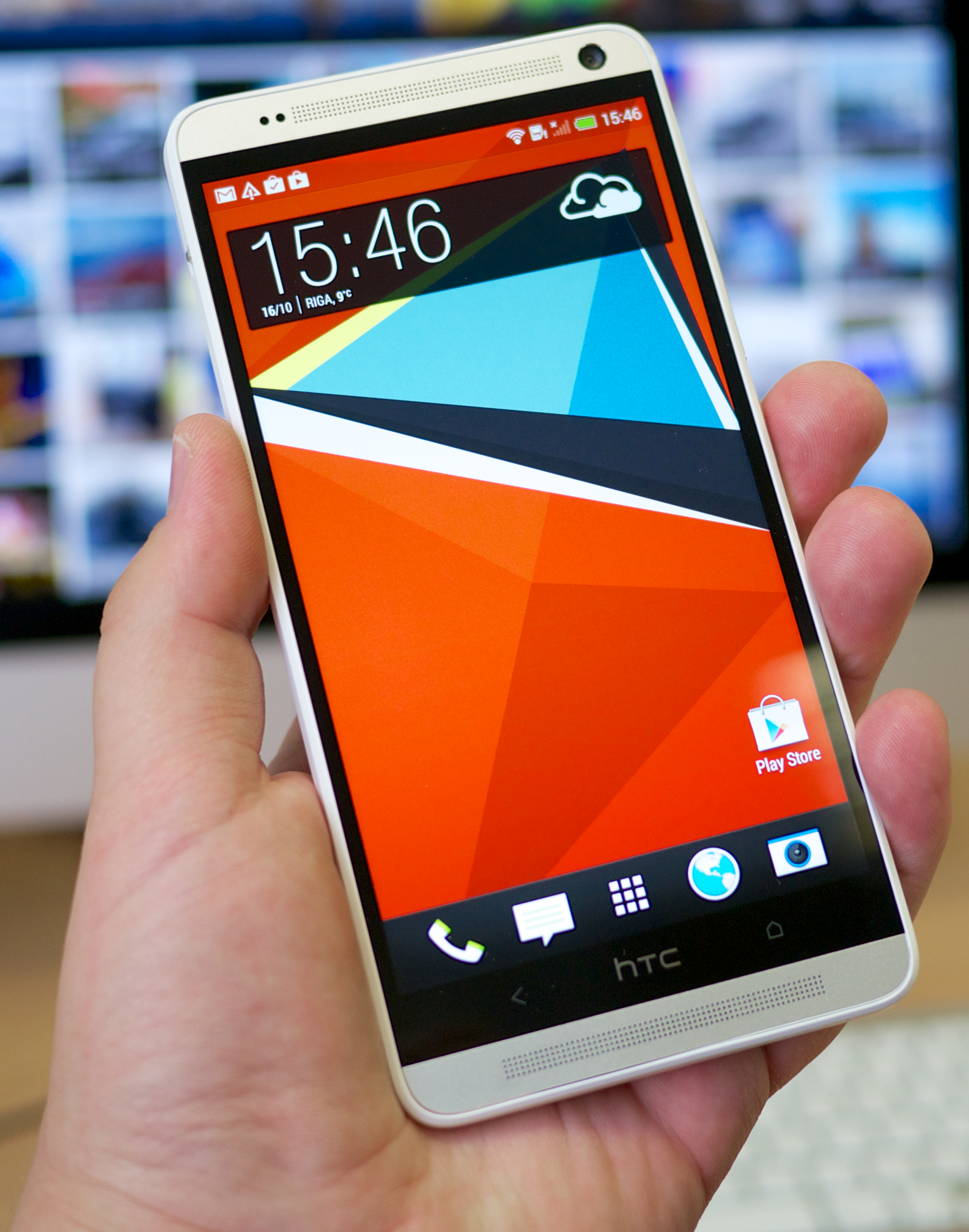
- Manufacturer: HTC
- Type: Smartphone ("phablet")
- Series: HTC One
- First released: October 2013
- Related: HTC One; HTC One Mini
- Form factor: Slate
- Dimensions: 164.5 mm (6.48 in) H 82.5 mm (3.25 in) W 10.29 mm (0.405 in) D
- Weight: 217 g (7.7 oz)
- Operating system: Original: Android 4.3 "Jelly Bean" with HTC Sense 5.5; Current: Android 5.0 "Lollipop"
- System-on-chip: Qualcomm Snapdragon 600 APQ8064
- CPU: 1.7 GHz quad-core Krait 300
- GPU: Adreno 320
- Memory: 2 GB RAM
- Storage: 16 or 32 GB
- Removable storage: up to 64 GB
- Battery: 3,300 mAh Li-Po
- Rear camera: 4-megapixel, 2688 x 1520 pixels, 2.0 μm camera with auto focus, UltraPixel BSI 1/3" image sensor, smart LED flash, F2.0 aperture, 28 mm lens, dedicated imaging chip, digital image stabilization, continuous shooting 1080p@30fps video recording, 720p@60fps video recording, video stabilization, slow motion video capture (768 × 432 pixels), HDR video recording
- Front camera: 2.1-megapixel front camera (1080p@30fps for recording and video chat), HDR video recording
- Display: 5.9 in (150 mm) Super LCD 3 with RGB matrix 1920×1080p pixels 16:9 Aspect ratio) (367 ppi); Corning Gorilla Glass 3.0
- Connectivity: Wi-Fi: 802.11 a/ac/b/g/n (2.4/5 GHz); GPS & GLONASS; Bluetooth 4.0 with apt-X; DLNA; Wi-Fi Direct; Miracast; Wi-Fi Hotspot; USB 2.0 (Micro-B Port, USB charging); 3.5 mm (0.14 in) TRRS
- Codename: T6
- Other: Accelerometer, gyroscope, digital compass, proximity sensor, ambient light sensor, fingerprint scanner

The HTC One Max is an Android-based phablet-sized smartphone designed and manufactured by HTC. The device is a larger variant of HTC's 2013 flagship high-end smartphone, the HTC One, notably incorporating a 5.9-inch display and fingerprint recognition features.

The release of the One Max was met with mixed critical reception; although the software updates introduced in Sense 5.5 were noted as positive improvements, the One Max was panned for using the same hardware as the One and for the operation of its fingerprint sensor.

== History ==
In June 2013, HTC North America's president disclosed plans to launch a "family of devices" around the design and technology of the then recently released HTC One. Shortly after the release of the HTC One in May 2013, leaked information revealed an upcoming HTC-produced phablet codenamed "T6", which was rumored to include a 5.9-inch 1080p display, stylus pen, and a fingerprint scanner. Leaked images revealed a device resembling a larger version of the HTC One alongside its standard and Mini counterparts, and competing devices. Other images showed the rumored fingerprint scanner on its rear, and a Verizon-branded model for the United States.

=== Release ===
The HTC One Max was officially unveiled on 14 October 2013 for an almost-immediate release in European and Asian markets. It was released in the United Kingdom exclusively by Vodafone (who indicated that its stock would begin arriving in-store later that week), while Sprint and Verizon Wireless confirmed plans to soon release the One Max in the United States. The One Max also includes 50 gigabytes of free Google Drive storage for 2 years.

A black version of the One Max was released in Hong Kong in mid-December 2013, and in late-December 2013, a red version and an amber gold version of the One Max were released in Taiwan.

== Specifications ==
The HTC One Max uses an almost identical design to the HTC One; however, the Max has a plastic bezel similar to the One Mini, uses a side-mounted power button, and also includes a removable back cover which exposes SIM card and microSD slots. The One Max inherits hardware features first introduced with the HTC One, such as front-facing dual BoomSound stereo speakers and a 4-megapixel rear-facing camera with an UltraPixel image sensor (however, the camera does not support optical image stabilization). Additionally, a fingerprint scanner is located directly below the camera. Internally, the One Max features a 1.7 GHz quad-core Snapdragon 600 processor with 2 GB of RAM, a 5.9 inch 1080p screen with a pixel density of 373 ppi, an infrared blaster and NFC, uses a larger (but still non-removable) 3300 mAh battery, and contains 16 or 32 GB of expandable storage.

The One Max ships with a version of Android 4.3 and HTC Sense 5.5; the update adds RSS and Google+ support to BlinkFeed, the option to disable BlinkFeed, a tool for making animated GIFs, and additional Highlights themes. The smartphone has recently been updated to Android 4.4. Users can unlock the phone by vertically swiping on the fingerprint scanner. Up to three fingers can be recognized by the system, and the One Max can also be configured to automatically launch a certain app when a specific finger is detected.

== Reception ==
Some early reviews criticized the One Max for its CPU specifications (specifically, using the older Snapdragon 600 processor instead of a newer 800 model), its use of the same camera as the HTC One, and the awkward placement of the fingerprint scanner. Vlad Savov of The Verge particularly felt that the sensor, which requires users to vertically swipe it when scanning, was positioned too close to the camera, and required an "uncomfortable" hand position to use properly because a user's fingers would naturally lay at an angle on the rear of the device in normal use. The 5.9" display, dual front-facing speakers, removable back cover with expandable storage, the power button placement, and the ability to customize or remove BlinkFeed were praised.

== See also ==
- HTC One Mini
- HTC U Ultra
