= Super LCD =

Type of display technology

Super LCD (SLCD) is a display technology used for mobile device displays produced by S-LCD Corporation, mostly used by HTC.

Super LCD differs from a regular LCD in that it does not have an air gap between the outer glass and the display element. This produces less glare and makes the user feel "closer" to the display itself. Super LCD's benefits also include lower power consumption and improved outdoor visibility. Super LCD has been succeeded by the newer Super LCD2 displays.

Some manufacturers had moved back to SLCD displays because of the expense and lack of production capacity of AMOLED displays. SLCD screens have remained popular as power consumption is comparably lower when displaying lighter colors such as the white background found on most internet pages. While AMOLED technology generally displays darker blacks and saturated colours making videos and images appear clearer and more vibrant, SLCD technology avoids the need for pentile subpixel formations (which use a larger shared blue subpixel to avoid fading over time) and thus creates sharper detail making text and videos appear clearer.

Also known as: "S-LCD", "S-LCD2", "SLCD", "SLCD2", "Super LCD2"
