= HTC One (M8) =

Smartphone manufactured by HTC

- Manufacturer: HTC
- Type: Touchscreen smartphone
- Series: HTC One
- First released: March 25, 2014
- Availability by region: March 25, 2014
- Predecessor: HTC One (M7)
- Successor: HTC One M9
- Related: HTC One Mini 2
- Form factor: Slate
- Dimensions: 146.4 mm (5.76 in) H 70.6 mm (2.78 in) W 9.4 mm (0.37 in) D
- Weight: 160 g (5.6 oz)
- Operating system: Original: Android 4.4.2 "KitKat"; Last official: Android 6.0 "Marshmallow"; Latest: Android 14 via LineageOS
- System-on-chip: Qualcomm Snapdragon 801
- CPU: 2.26 GHz quad-core (MSM8974ABv3); 2.45 GHz quad-core (MSM8974ACv3)
- GPU: Adreno 330 550/578 MHz
- Memory: 2 GB LPDDR3 RAM
- Storage: 16 or 32 GB flash
- Removable storage: microSD up to 128 GB
- SIM: MicroSIM
- Battery: 2,600 mAh Li-po battery
- Rear camera: 4.0-megapixel; 2.0 μm camera with autofocus, UltraPixel BSI image sensor, dual-LED dual tone flash, F2.0 aperture, 28 mm lens, continuous shooting, 2.0-megapixel depth of field sensor.
- Front camera: 5.0-megapixel, 2.0 μm camera, BSI image sensor
- Display: 5.0 in (130 mm) Super LCD 3 with RGB matrix 1920 x 1080 pixels (16:9 Aspect ratio) (441 ppi); Corning Gorilla Glass 3.0
- Connectivity: List: Wi-Fi; Wi-Fi Direct; Wi-Fi hotspot; Infrared; DLNA; GPS/GLONASS; NFC; Bluetooth; USB (Micro-B port, USB charging); MHL; USB OTG; 3.5 millimetres (0.14 in) headphone jack
- Data inputs: List: Accelerometer; Gyroscope
- Codename: M8
- Website: http://www.htc.com/www/smartphones/htc-one-m8/

The HTC One (M8) (also marketed as the all-new HTC One) is an Android or Windows smartphone manufactured and marketed by HTC. Following a number of leaks that occurred during the months prior, the device was officially unveiled in a press conference on March 25, 2014, and released the same day by Verizon Wireless at retail, and by other Canadian and United States carriers for online orders prior to its wider retail availability in mid-April.

The device retains a similar design to the HTC One (M7), its predecessor in the HTC One series, but features a larger, rounded chassis incorporating a 5-inch 1080p display, a quad-core Qualcomm Snapdragon 801 processor, a depth of field sensor which can be used to individually refocus and apply various effects to the foreground and background elements of photos taken with the device's camera, a higher resolution front camera, improvements to the device's front-facing stereo speakers, expandable storage, new gesture functionality, and a refreshed version of HTC's Sense software. In August 2014, HTC unveiled a software variant of the device running Windows Phone 8.1 instead of Android, aiming to adapt the operating system's experience to the device "[without] any compromises."

The device received mostly positive reviews, with particular praise devoted to the design improvements within its hardware and software, and its upgraded internals in comparison to the One (M7). However, some reviewers criticized certain aspects of the device, such as its large bezels, the lack of significant improvements to the main camera's image quality, removal of optical image stabilization, and the inconsistent quality of the effects enabled by the depth sensor.

== Development ==
Although it was once a leading manufacturer of smartphones in terms of market share, HTC has struggled in the wake of other vendors such as Samsung and Apple, due particularly to their wider marketing reach. As was common during the early years of Android, HTC manufactured a large number of exclusive devices customized for several major U.S. carriers, who took on the role of marketing them. In 2013, HTC chose to release a single flagship device, the HTC One, across multiple carriers, and handled much of its marketing and promotion. While it was critically acclaimed, the launch of the One (despite being deemed the best in the company's history by the president of its North American division) was hindered by supply chain issues and was ultimately deemed to be commercially unsuccessful. HTC continued to lose market share, and in October 2013, had its first-ever quarterly loss—which is attributed to poor marketing. As a result, HTC planned to "leverage the momentum" and critical success of the One to produce an updated version for 2014, expanding upon concepts introduced by the previous model. The company also planned to release a "much broader spectrum of products" in 2014, by placing an increased focus on the mid-range smartphone market with devices such as the Desire 816.

Details about a possible HTC One successor, codenamed "M8", first leaked in November 2013. Photos posted by a user of the Chinese forum Baidu Tieba revealed a unibody chassis part that also covered the edges of the device (removing the need for injection molding), and a second hole above the camera on the rear of the device—speculated to be either a fingerprint reader or a second camera. In December 2013, the HTC One Mini was banned from sale in the United Kingdom as the result of a patent infringement lawsuit by Nokia. While the then-current HTC One was also affected by the ruling, its sales ban was stayed by the court pending an appeal, since the judge indicated that banning HTC One sales would have a negative effect on the company as it prepared a new model, which was assumed to have not infringed the patents, for release in either February or March 2014.

In January 2014, Bloomberg News reported that the device would carry a similar design to the previous model, but with a larger screen of at least 5 inches in size, and that the phone would feature two cameras sensors to provide better focus, depth of field and image quality. In February 2014, a number of leaks occurred. The first, by a Russian website on Twitter, revealed the rear of the device and confirming early reports about its design and dual-camera layout, with a dual-tone flash. Another leak by evleaks revealed an updated version of HTC Sense, retaining the BlinkFeed home screen, and depicting on-screen software buttons. In March 2014, a major leak occurred with the release of a 12-minute-long hands-on video by a YouTube user, detailing the device's HTC Sense 6.0 software and its inclusion of a microSD card slot.

In February 2014, HTC began to release a series of teaser videos promoting a launch event for the new HTC One on March 25, 2014. Each video featured a highly technical explanation of a feature from the original One by an engineer, a simplified explanation by another person, followed by the engineer disclosing censored information about the new model

=== Unveiling and release ===
The new device, officially called HTC One (M8) or the new HTC One, was unveiled during a press conference on March 24, 2014, that was held simultaneously in London and New York City. Verizon Wireless began offering the device at selected retail outlets immediately after the event. The device was scheduled for broad retail availability in North America on April 10, and across 230 carriers in over 100 countries through the end of April.

It was available in grey, silver, and amber gold color options. In the United States, the gold model was carried exclusively by the retailer Best Buy.

== Android update history ==
Due to the HTC One M8's prevalence and status in the Android community, it has received community updates for several years after its discontinuation. This makes it one of the longest-updated Android devices, with uninterrupted version releases from Android 4.4 "KitKat" to Android 14. Users of Android 14 on the HTC One M8 report it to be relatively stable and usable, with a few bugs.

| Creator | Based on | Android version (major) |
|---|---|---|
| HTC | AOSP | 4.4 "KitKat" |
| HTC | AOSP | 5 "Lollipop" |
| HTC | AOSP | 6 "Marshmallow" |
| Lineage | LineageOS | 7 "Nougat" |
| Unofficial | LineageOS | 8 "Oreo" |
| Lineage | LineageOS | 9 "Pie" |
| Lineage | LineageOS | 10 |
| Unofficial | LineageOS | 11 |
| Unofficial | LineageOS | 12 |
| Unofficial | LineageOS | 13 |
| Unofficial | LineageOS | 14 |

== Specifications ==
=== Design ===
The overall design of the HTC One (M8) closely resembles the 2013 model, the HTC One (M7), with a unibody aluminum frame and dual front-facing speakers, and a brushed metal backing. Compared to its predecessor, the M8's aluminum casing makes up 90% of the frame, up from about 70% previously, as its frame elects for a full metal construction with a more curved shape (rather than a plastic bezel) and thus incorporates smaller amounts of polycarbonate. While it is the same thickness as the previous model, it is slightly heavier due to the differences in its construction. Located at the top of the device is the power button with an integrated IR blaster; the power button was moved to the right side, while some antennas are being housed behind a plastic band also located at the top. At the bottom of the device are a micro USB 2.0 port supporting Qualcomm's QuickCharge 2.0 technology and a headphone jack. Unlike the One (M7), the M8 uses nano-SIM cards to save internal space, and with the possibility of dual SIM models in mind. The device uses on-screen software buttons consisting of "Back", "Home", and "Recent apps" keys, instead of the pair of physical capacitive buttons used by the previous model. The previous design had been panned by critics for being irregular, and causing a black bar to occur on-screen if an app required the deprecated "Menu" key in violation of Android human interface guidelines.

=== Hardware ===
The hardware of the device was upgraded in comparison to its predecessor, using a 2.3 GHz quad-core Snapdragon 801 with 2 GB of RAM, and a 5.0-inch, 1080p Super LCD 3 touchscreen display with a pixel density of 441 ppi, protected by a layer of Gorilla Glass 3 with a scratch-resistance coating. The device came with either 16 or 32 GB of internal storage, and also included a MicroSD slot for up to 128 GB of additional storage. The BoomSound stereo speakers were also improved with deeper enclosures, a larger amplifier, and an updated DSP for improved sound quality. It also incorporates a sensor hub for discrete motion tracking.

==== Camera ====
The main/primary rear-mounted camera retains the "UltraPixel" image sensor (OmniVision OV4688) composed of pixels that are 2.0 μm in size. The UltraPixel sensor was updated to provide better color accuracy in lit photographs, and the device now includes a dual-tone flash.

Similar to the competing Galaxy S5, the M8's main rear camera has an image sensor with a wide aspect ratio of 16:9. Its resolution is 2688×1520 pixels, approximately four megapixels, and it uses an aperture of f/2.0.

The devices record 1080p footage at 60 frames per second, which is twice the framerate as the predecessor. However, unlike the competing Galaxy S5, Xperia Z2 and LG G3, the HTC One M8 lacks 2160p 4K video recording (~ 8.3 Megapixels per video frame) due to the insufficient resolution of the image sensor.

Although the resolution and processing performance would have sufficed for 1440p video, the One M8 lacks it too.

The main camera is accompanied by a second, 2-megapixel depth of field sensor (OmniVision OV2722) located directly above the main camera as a part of the device's "Duo Camera" system. The sensor analyzes the distance and position of elements within a photo and generates a depth map, which is embedded within each photo. The depth map, along with other information, can then be used to generate 3D parallax effects, to apply filters individually to different parts of the image, such as blurring the background to focus on an object in the foreground (branded "UFocus"), or to copy and paste an object from one photo into another, similar to those available with a Lytro camera. In mid-April, HTC released a software development kit that allows other apps to take advantage of the depth mapping system and stated that the SDK will be used by the camera app on the Google Play edition. HTC CEO Peter Chou said that the work on the Duo Camera took 18 months, in close collaboration with Qualcomm whose Snapdragon 801 ISPs were boosted to handle the device's imaging needs.

While 2013 phone's (M7) rear camera had optical image stabilization (OIS), it was not included in the device as developers deemed it to be "incompatible" with the new depth sensor system. It was replaced by "smart stabilization" features enabled by the depth sensor. The operating system's camera interface was also streamlined, with a new menu for switching between photo, video, Zoe, and Pan 360 modes, and a revised settings interface.

The secondary/front camera for selfies that is using a Samsung S5K5E2 image sensor has a higher megapixel count than the primary/rear camera.

=== Software ===
The device shipped with a customized version of Android 4.4.2 "KitKat", utilizing version 6.0 of the HTC Sense software suite. It built upon the design of Sense 5 with a more minimal design, color themes, and optimizations for larger screens and Android 4.4's transparency features. A new system called "Motion Launch" was added that allows users to turn on the display by double-tapping it while picking up the device, and allows unlocking directly to BlinkFeed, the home screen, or voice dialing mode by tapping the screen and dragging in specific directions. Pressing the volume button while holding the phone horizontally will launch the camera app. An "extreme power saving mode" was also added, which caps CPU usage and disables non-essential applications, services, and sensors to conserve battery life when running low; the mode only allows access to the phone, messaging, e-mail, calendar, and calculator apps, and disables multitasking.

BlinkFeed was updated with a revised design, which only now displays the weather clock if it's set as the default home screen, and will also now allow third-party developers to add content sources through an SDK; Fitbit (whose app, also pre-loaded on the device, can integrate with its sensor hub as a pedometer) and Foursquare were announced as the launch partners for the SDK. The HTC Share functionality has been replaced by a dedicated Zoe app, which allows users to collaborate on highlight reels. The TV app was updated to include live sports statistics and "Fan Talk", which allows users to track and join conversations relating to TV programs on Twitter.

HTC committed to providing firmware updates for at least two years following its release. The BlinkFeed, Gallery, TV, and Zoe apps, along with a "HTC Service Pack", are packaged as apps on Google Play Store, allowing them to be updated independently from the firmware itself. An update to Android 4.4.3 was released in July 2014. In October 2014, an update to 4.4.4 was released, adding a suite of enhanced camera features branded as "HTC Eye Experience"; this includes "Split Capture", "Photo Booth", and "Auto Selfie" modes, voice shutter, face tracking while recording video, and the "Live Makeup" filter. An update to Android 5.0 "Lollipop" was first released for unlocked models in January 2015. The Android 5 update introduces the issues of freezing, forced reboots, decrease in frame rates and lag when using the smartphone for heavy gaming. AT&T's HTC One M8 model received the Android 5.0 Lollipop OTA update in April 2015. Unlocked models were upgraded to Android 6.0 "Marshmallow" in December 2015.

=== Accessories ===
HTC unveiled a "Dot View Case" for the device during its press conference. The cover of this flip case contains a grid of holes, allowing a clock, weather forecast, and notifications of messages and calls on the screen below it to be displayed through the holes in a style resembling a dot matrix display.

== Variants ==
=== Google Play edition ===
A Google Play edition (GPE) of the device was also released. While it otherwise runs stock Android without HTC Sense, it still contains HTC software to support certain features, such as an "HTC Photo Edit" app for use with the Duo Camera, and Motion Launch, and selected HTC Sense apps can be downloaded through Google Play. Google discontinued its GPE devices in January 2015 when the Google Play Edition M8, the last remaining GPE device available on its online store, was removed from sale.

=== Harman Kardon Edition ===
HTC released a special Harman Kardon Edition model of the smartphone featuring an upgraded Harman Kardon audio system, a dark grey finish with gold accents, and a pair of Harman Kardon AE-S earbuds on April 29, 2014, exclusively via Sprint in the United States. Aside from these changes, it is otherwise identical to the base model.

=== One (M8) Dual SIM ===
On July 2, 2014, HTC Germany announced a Dual SIM variant via a press release. The phone was made available in Germany, Austria and Switzerland in calendar week 28 of that year for a price of €679 (799CHF) which at that time was slightly higher than the MSRP of €649 for the single SIM version but some €100 higher than typical retail prices which had already begun to drop for the regular model. Other selected markets followed. In Germany the release was limited with only METRO-owned electronics store chains Media Markt and Saturn carrying the phone in small quantities. The only color option was "Gunmetal Grey". The hardware is mostly identical to the regular model without the option to double the 16GB of on-device storage as is the case with the single SIM variant. Also, the radio supports less LTE-bands, most notably omitting band 20 which reduces LTE-usability in countries like Germany where providers prefer the 800 MHz frequency outside of downtown areas. Both SIM-slots are of nano-size and the device retains the additional microSD-slot. The software is also mostly identical with the addition of the Dual-SIM settings and related modifications in dialer and messaging apps. While being delivered with Android KitKat the device received an over-the-air-update to Lollipop (5.0.2) in May 2015, a considerable amount of time later than other variants.

=== One (M8) for Windows ===
HTC One (M8) for Windows
- Manufacturer: HTC
- Series: HTC One
- First released: August 20, 2014
- Weight: 160 g (5.6 oz)
- Operating system: Original: Windows Phone 8.1 Update 1 Beta: Windows 10 Mobile
- Website: http://www.htc.com/www/smartphones/htc-one-m8-windows/

On August 18, 2014, HTC and Verizon Wireless announced a new variant of the device known as the HTC One (M8) for Windows, which runs Windows Phone 8.1 Update 1 instead of Android, marking HTC's first Windows Phone device since 2013's HTC Windows Phone 8XT. Its hardware is nearly identical to the Android version, aside from minor differences such as colors (it was only available in dark grey) and branding. The device shipped with several HTC-developed apps to provide Sense features on top of Windows Phone, such as ports of BlinkFeed, Sense TV, and Video Highlights, an HTC Camera app for using the Duo Camera and its depth mapping effects, and support for the Dot View Case and double-tapping the screen to wake it up.

The development of the device for Windows was enabled by changes to the Windows Phone platform by Microsoft to allow for more flexibility and variance in hardware designs, such as support for on-screen buttons. These changes made it theoretically possible for OEMs to re-use hardware designs from Android devices for use as part of a Windows Phone device. HTC Americas president Jason Mackenzie argued that with the device for Windows, HTC was the first smartphone maker to "[launch] an iconic device on multiple operating systems without making any compromises."

The device is compatible with the Windows 10 Mobile Insider Preview but not with the final public release version of the OS.

=== One (M8) Eye ===
HTC unveiled the One (M8) Eye in October 2014. It is otherwise identical to the standard model, except the infrared and NFC connectivity is removed, and the rear UltraPixel camera is replaced by a 13 megapixel camera. The Eye was only released in China and India.

== Reception ==
The Android version of the HTC One (M8) received mostly positive reviews from critics. The industrial design of the device was considered to be more "premium" looking than the previous model due to the increase in metal and less plastic, and more comfortable to hold due to its more curved shape. David Pierce of The Verge described the design as "[a] wonderfully rare mix between the beauty of the old One and the unabashed utility of a phone like the Galaxy S4. It’s made to be looked at, to be ogled and admired, but it’s also made to be used." TechRadar suggested that the HTC One (M8)'s design aged well against upcoming metal smartphones, being sufficient to "survive the onslaught of the iPhone 6 and the Galaxy S6". However, some reviewers felt that its more rounded and polished chassis made the device feel more slippery to hold, and the curved edges made it harder to grip. Some reviewers panned the increased height of the device and thick bezels compared to the preceding HTC One (M7) and other competing smartphones; in particular Ars Technica criticized HTC for not using its shift towards software buttons to reduce the size of the device's bezel, noting that they did not remove the black strip below the screen where the previous, physical buttons were.

Similarly to the previous model, the device's rear-facing camera received mixed reviews. While it received praise for its low-light capabilities, faster autofocus, along with the updates to HTC's camera software, the camera was criticized for not showing any notable improvements in image quality over the previous model, producing soft-looking images that only looked acceptable at small sizes due to aggressive noise-reduction and inadequate software processing. In addition, the device's rear camera lacked optical image stabilization (OIS) which had been found in the proceeding M7. However, Engadget praised HTC's focus on "selfies" with its 5-megapixel front-facing camera, and The Verge quipped that even its "ultimate selfie machine" took better photos than the rear-facing camera in many situations. The Duo Camera functionality received similarly mixed reaction; while critics felt that the effects could be considered fun and useful by end-users, the effects themselves (particularly the refocus effect) were panned for not having any positive effect on overall image quality, and for having inconsistent quality themselves. Ars Technica specifically considered the Duo Camera to be "poorly executed gimmicks", noting that the effect could be replicated in software and that HTC should have instead focused on improving the hardware of the rear camera. Anand Lal Shimpi of AnandTech praised the look and feel of the device, Sense 6.0, and the better power efficiency with the Snapdragon 801. Anand also praised the camera app and UI, as well as the effects processing such as the zoom and blur features, stating that the device was "an extremely versatile shooter," but noted deficiencies, such as the inadequate image quality and lack of image stabilization. Ultimately, he stated that the new HTC One "is an upgrade in so many areas, but lacked a substantial step forward in primary camera quality."

== See also ==
- List of Windows Phone 8.1 devices

| Preceded by HTC One (2013) | HTC One series 2014 | Succeeded by HTC One M9 |
