= National Taipei University of Technology =

Public university in Taipei, Taiwan

- 國立臺北科技大學
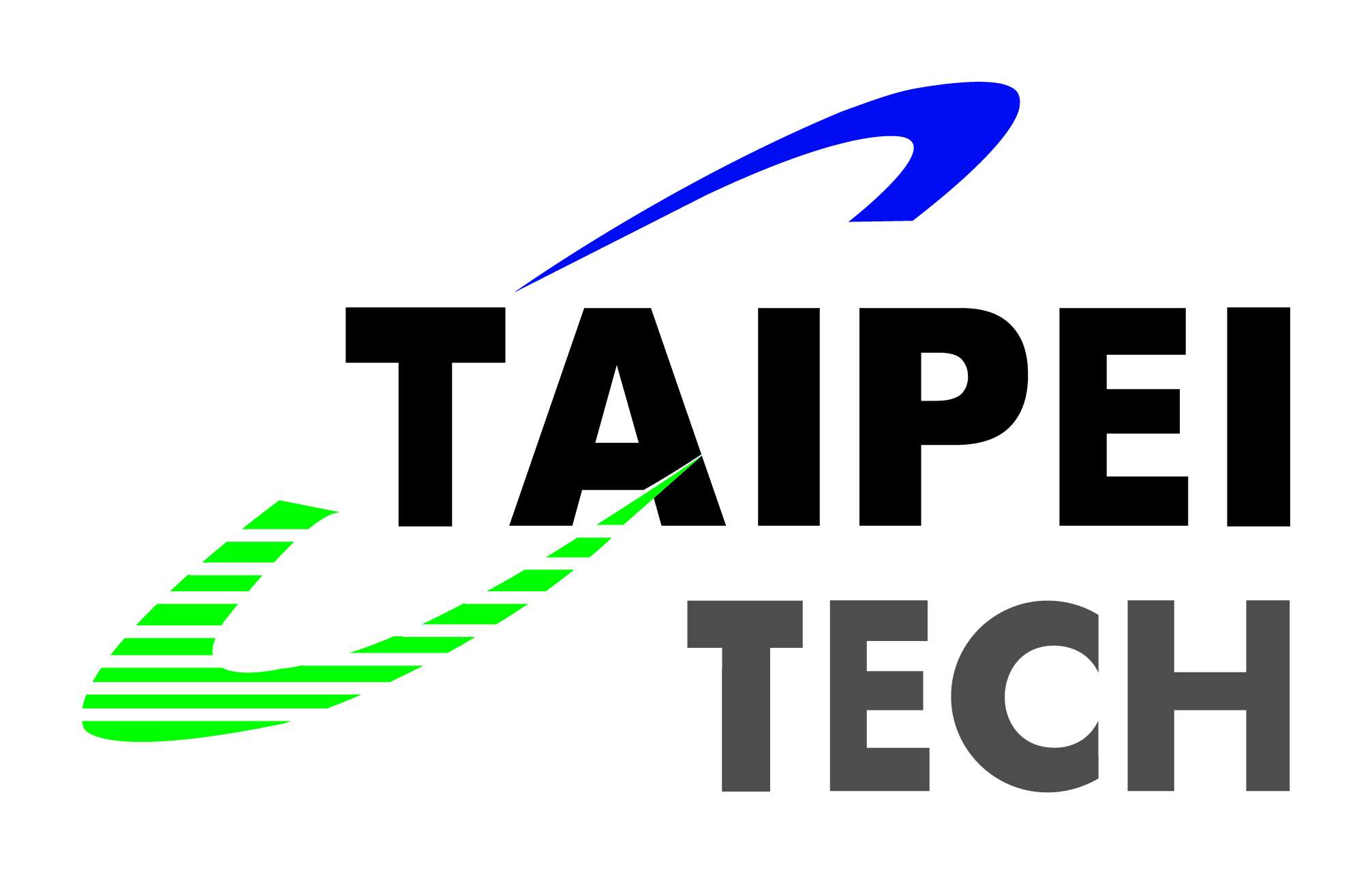
- Former names: National Taipei Institute of Technology (1994–1997)
- Motto: 誠、樸、精、勤 sêng, phok, cheng, khîn
- Motto in English: Integrity, Humility, Intellect, Fortitude
- Type: Public
- Established: 1912
- President: Yi-Jun Jen
- Academic staff: 488 (full-time); 355 (adjunct) (2025)
- Students: 13,276 (2025)
- Undergraduates: 7125 (2025)
- Postgraduates: 5991 (2025)
- Other students: 160 (2025) (junior college)
- Location: 1, Sec. 3, Zhongxiao E. Rd., Daan District, Taipei, 106344, Taiwan; 25.0438884°N 121.534399°E
- Colours
- Website: www-en.ntut.edu.tw

National Taipei University of Technology
- Traditional Chinese: 國立臺北科技大學
- Simplified Chinese: 国立台北科技大学
Transcriptions
Standard Mandarin
- Hanyu Pinyin: Guólì Táiběi Kējì Dàxué
Southern Min
- Hokkien POJ: Kok-li̍p Tâi-pak Kho-ki Tāi-ha̍k

National Taipei University of Technology (Taipei Tech; Chinese: 國立臺北科技大學; pinyin: Guólì Táiběi Kējì Dàxué) is a public university in Taipei, Taiwan. It is a member of the Global Research & Industry Alliance (Gloria) of the Ministry of Science and Technology and accredited by AACSB. Located in the Daan district of Taipei, the school was established in 1912 as the School of Industrial Instruction, one of the earliest intermediate-higher educational institutions in Taiwan.

The current president of the university is Yi-Jun Jen. The university is part of the University System of Taipei, along with National Taipei University, Taipei Medical University and National Taiwan Ocean University. Its comprehensive undergraduate and graduate programs offer degrees in the STEM fields as well as design, architecture, management, humanities, and social sciences. It is also a part of the University Academic Alliance in Taiwan or UAAT, composed of the Top 12 academic institutions in Taiwan chosen by the Ministry of Education (Taiwan) in 2023.

The 495-acre campus in downtown Taipei was divided into three sections during the city's development. The main campus (West, East, and South) in Taipei now only spans 22 acres, next to the affluent Huashan 1914 Creative Park and the Guang Hua neighborhood, an area known as the Electric Town of Taipei due to the computer goods and electronics stores.

== History ==
The university was established as the School of Industrial Instruction (工業講習所; Pe̍h-ōe-jī: Kang-gia̍p Káng-si̍p-só͘) in 1912. The institution underwent several name changes and reorganizations during the Japanese colonial period in Taiwan. After the (Nationalist) Republic of China central government settled in Taiwan as an outcome of the war against the Communist regime, the institution was renamed Provincial Taipei Institute of Technology (臺灣省立臺北工業專科學校) in 1948 and served as a vocational technical college. In 1981, it was renamed National Taipei Institute of Technology (國立臺北工業專科學校). In the 1990s its status was upgraded to that of a university, resulting in its name change to National Taipei University of Technology (國立臺北科技大學) in 1997.

In 2025 the National Taipei University of Technology partnered with the Taiwan Space Agency, Institute for Information Industry, and Industrial Technology Research Institute to offer a three year intensive program in satellite communications technology.

== Rankings ==
University rankings

Global – Overall
- QS World: =420 (2026)
- QS Employability: 301-500 (2023)
- RUR World: 557 (2024)
- THE World: 801-1000 (2024)
- USNWR Global: 1223 (2024)

Regional – Overall
- QS Asia: 82 (2024)

National – Overall
- QS National: 6 (2025)

Taipei Tech ranks 425th globally in QS 2025, making it the 6th best university in Taiwan. It is also ranked 801-1000th globally in Times Higher Education 2024, and 1223rd in U.S. News & World Report 2024. Taipei Tech is also reputable among employers in Taiwan—according to CHEERS Magazine in 2021, it is the 6th most preferred university overall for Taiwanese companies and the 1st among technical universities.

=== Rankings by Subject/Area ===
==== QS rankings by subject in 2024 ====
Subject	Taipei Tech's world rank
Engineering - Chemical	75
Engineering - Mechanical	101
Architecture & Built Environment	101-150
Materials Sciences	101-150
Engineering - Electrical and Electronic	130
Engineering & Technology	170
Engineering - Civil & Structural	201-240
Computer Science & Information Systems	251-300
Biological Sciences	251-300
Environmental Sciences	301-350
Business & Management Studies	301-350
Physics & Astronomy	501-550

==== National rankings by subject area in 2024 ====
Subject	Taipei Tech's National rank
Mechanical, Aeronautical & Manufacturing Engineering	2
Chemical Engineering	2
Materials Sciences	2
Electrical & Electronic Engineering	3
Architecture & Built Environment	3
Environmental Sciences	3
Business & Management Studies	4
Civil and Structural Engineering	4
Computer Science & Information Systems	6
Physics & Astronomy	9

== Academics ==
Taipei Tech includes seven colleges, two centers, and one office. The university currently has 488 full-time faculty members.

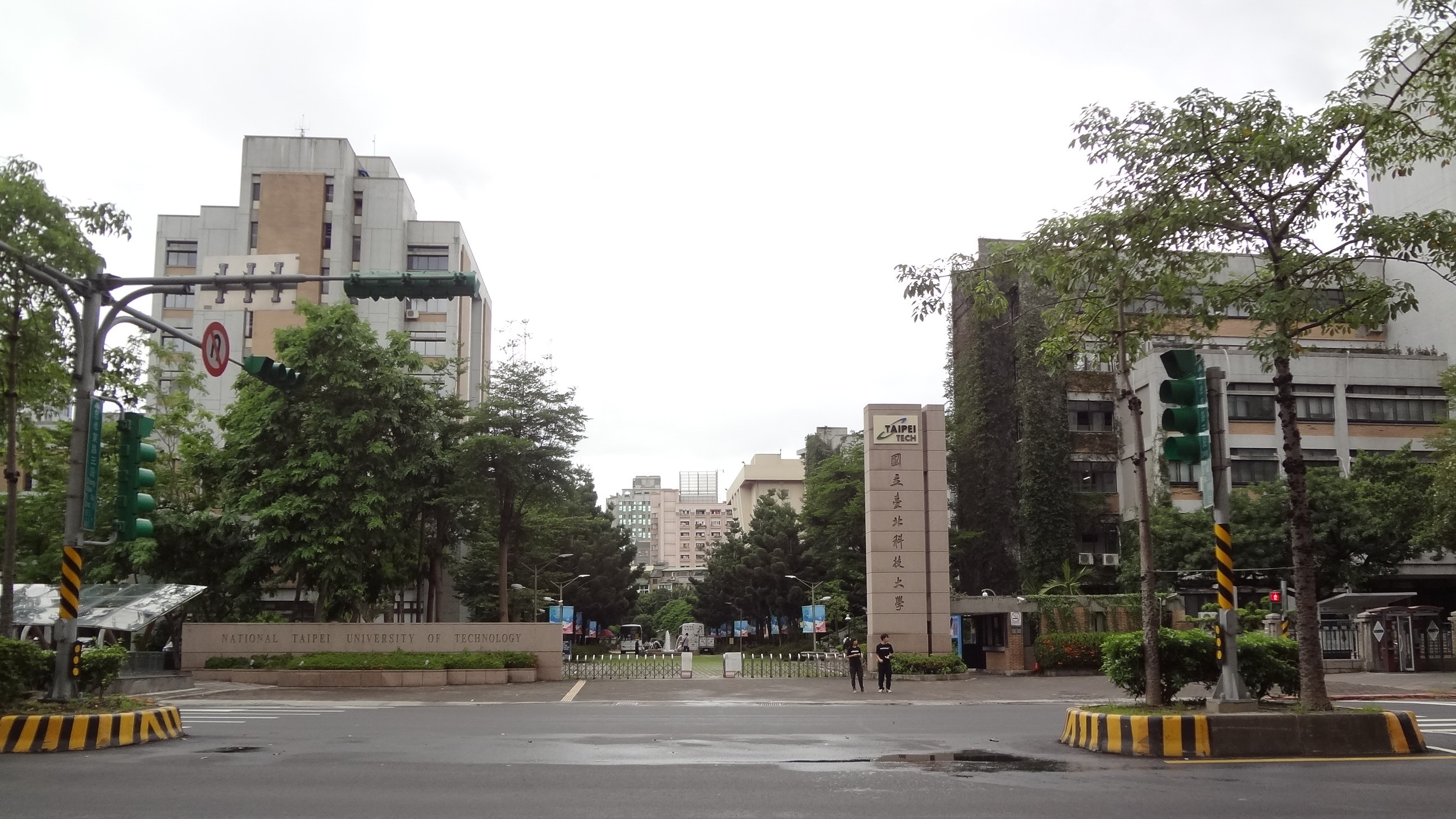
The main gate on Zhongxiao East Road

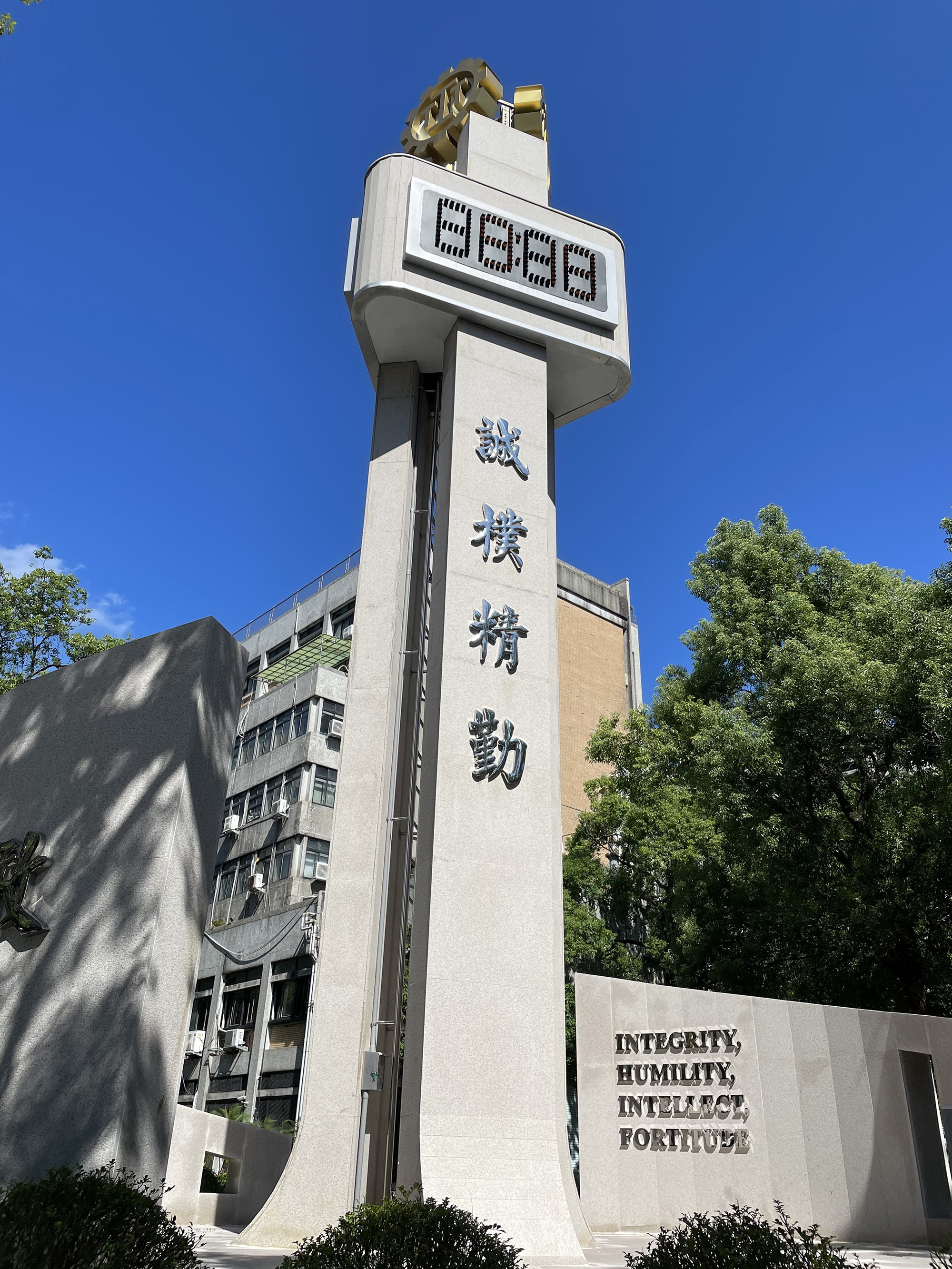
The 70th Anniversary Commemorative Bell Tower after its 2024 renovation. The building at the back houses the College of Mechanical and Electrical Engineering.

=== College of Electric Engineering and Computer Science ===
- Dept. of Computer Science and Information Engineering - Bachelor/ MS/ Ph.D. Program
- Dept. of Electrical Engineering - Bachelor/ MS/ Ph.D. Program
- Dept. of Electronic Engineering - Bachelor/ MS/ Ph.D. Program
- Dept. of Electro-Optical Engineering - Bachelor/ MS/ Ph.D. Program
- Institute of Computer and Communication Engineering - MS/ Ph.D. Program

=== College of Mechanical and Electrical Engineering ===
- Dept. of Mechanical Engineering - Bachelor Program
- Dept. of Vehicle Engineering - Bachelor/MS Program
- Dept. of Energy and Refrigerating Air-Conditioning Engineering - Bachelor/MS Program
- Institute of Mechatronic Engineering - MS Program
- Institute of Manufacturing Technology - MS Program/Ph.D. Program
- Institute of Automation Technology - MS Program
- Institute of Mechanical and Electrical Engineering - Ph.D. Program

=== College of Engineering ===
- Dept. of Chemical Engineering and Biotechnology - Bachelor Program
- Dept. of Civil Engineering - Bachelor Program
- Dept. of Materials and Mineral Resources Engineering - Bachelor Program
- Dept. of Molecular Science and Engineering - Bachelor Program
- Institute of Biotechnology - MS Program
- Institute of Chemical Engineering - MS/Ph.D Program
- Institute of Civil and Disaster Prevention Engineering - MS Program
- Institute of Environmental Engineering and Management - MS Program
- Institute of Materials Science and Engineering - MS/ Ph.D. Program
- Institute of Mineral Resources Engineering - MS/ Ph.D. Program
- Institute of Organic and Polymeric Materials - MS Program

=== College of Management ===
- Dept. of Business Management - Bachelor/ MBA Program
- Dept. of Industrial Engineering and Management - Bachelor/ MBA/ Ph.D. Program
- Institute of Information and Logistics Management - MBA Program
- Institute of Services Technology and Management - MBA Program
- Institute of Industrial and Business Management - Ph.D. Program
- EMBA - MBA Program
- International MBA - MBA Program
- International Master of Financial Technology & Innovative Entrepreneur (IMFI) - MBA Program

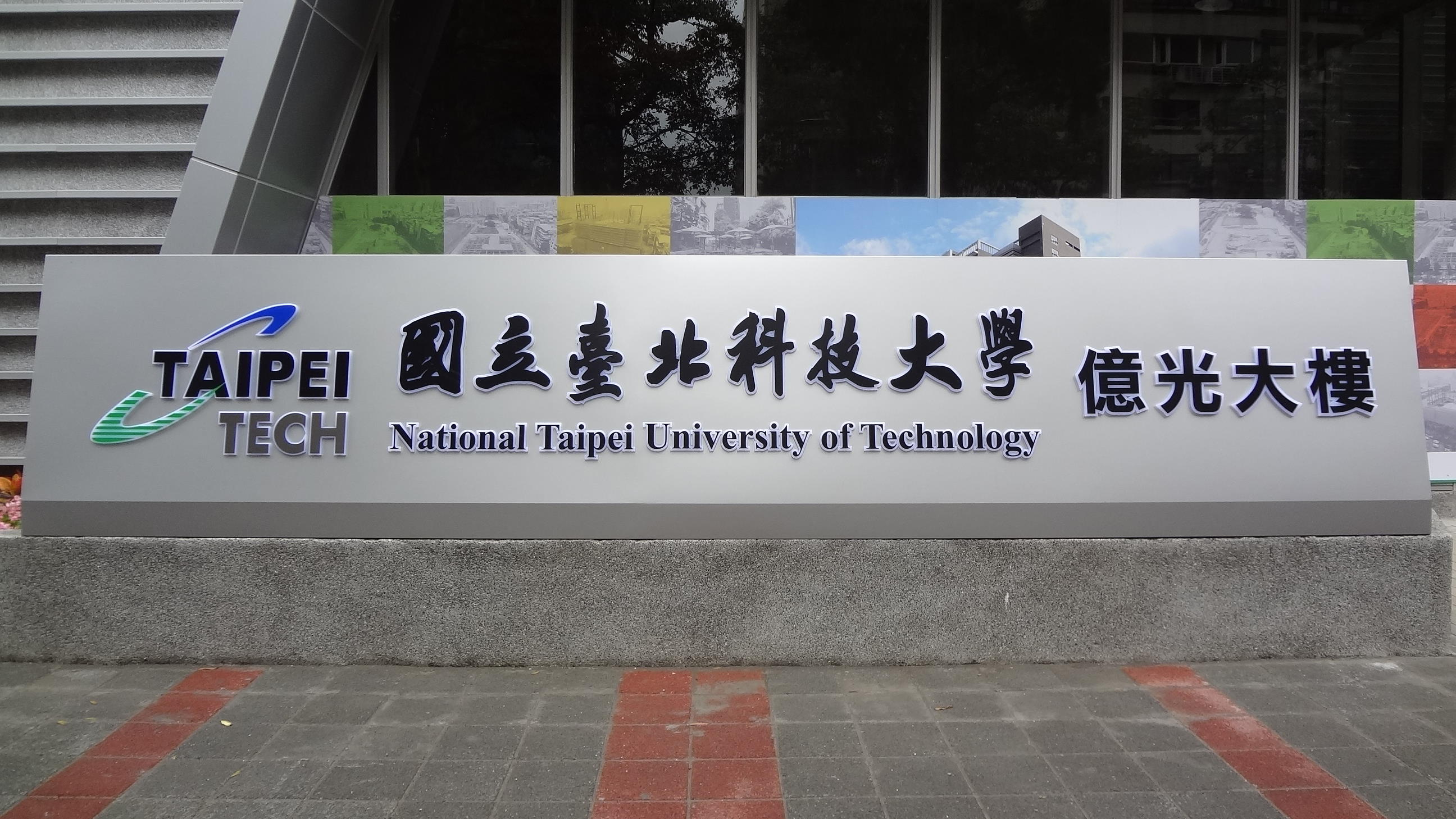
Taipei Tech's Everlight Building

=== College of Design ===
- Dept. of Architecture - Bachelor Program
- Dept. of Industrial Design - Bachelor Program
- Institute of Innovation and Design - MFA Program
- Institute of Design - Ph.D. Program
- Institute of Architecture and Urban Design - MFA Program
- Institute of Interactive Media Design - MFA Program
- International Program in Creative & Sustainable Architecture Studies - Master Program

=== College of Humanities and Social Sciences ===
- Dept. of Cultural Vocation Development - Bachelor Program
- Dept. of English - Bachelor/ MA Program in Applied Linguistics
- Institute of Technological and Vocational Education - MEd/ EdD Program
- Institute of Intellectual Property - MS Program

=== Innovation Frontier Institute of Research for Science and Technology (iFIRST) ===
- Artificial Intelligence Technology - MS/ Ph.D. Program
- Information Security - MS/ Ph.D. Program
- Semiconductor Technology - MS Program

== Architecture & Landscape ==
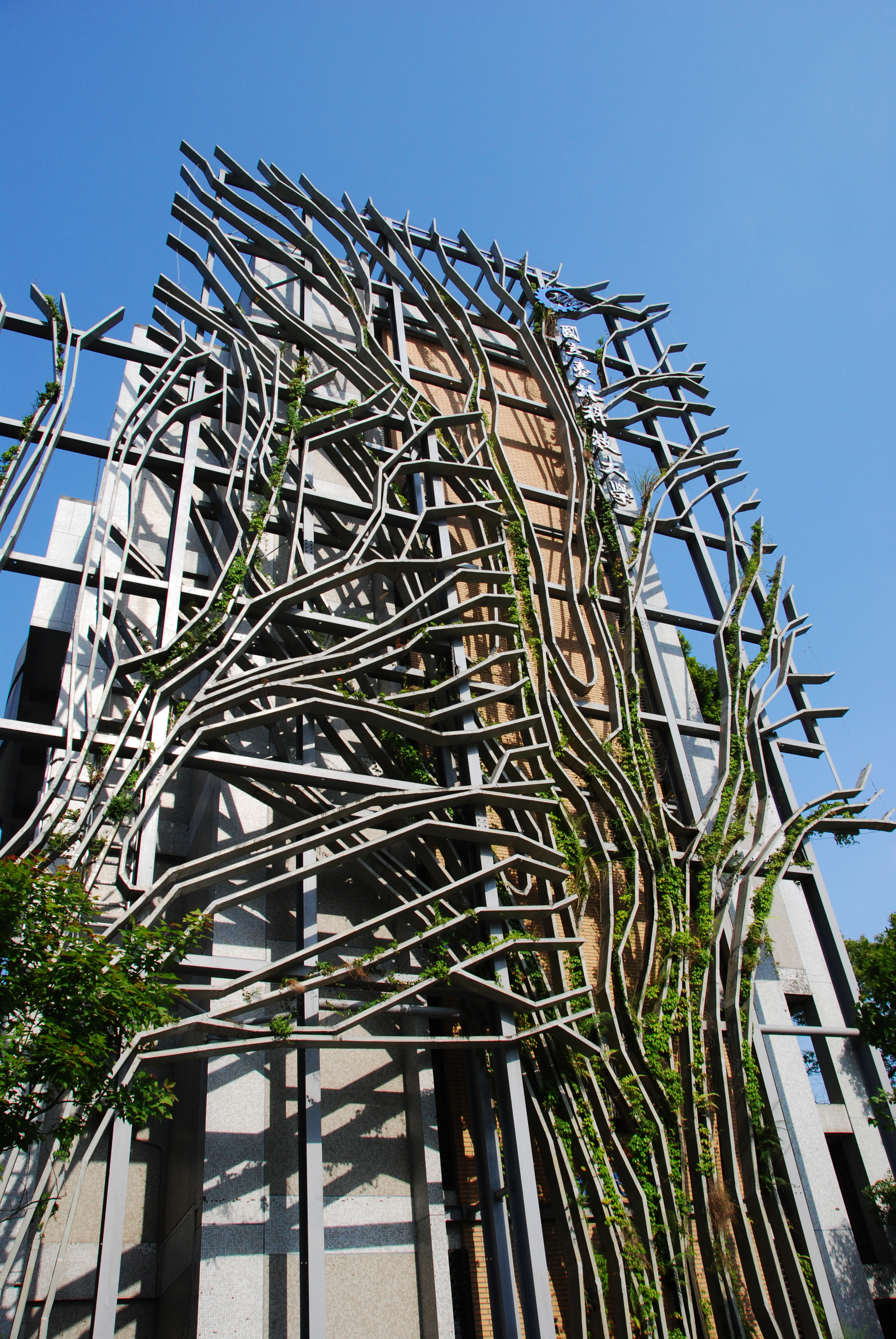
The Green Gate, a conspicuous structure at the intersection of Zhongxiao East Rd. and Xinsheng South Rd.

=== The Green Gate ===
The Green Gate was completed in 2010 to make the campus more eco-friendly. It won the Special Mention of Green Campus and Most Favorable Online in the 2010 Taipei Landscape Award.

== Notable alumni ==
- Charles Liang, Founder of Supermicro, co-founder of HTC
- Harlem Yu, Award-winning singer-songwriter and television host
- Lee Shih-chuan, Secretary-General of Executive Yuan (2014-2015), deputy mayor of Kaohsiung City
- Li Kuei-Hsien, Taiwanese author and poet, noted for writing extended verses with Taiwanese Hokkien, was a nominee for the Nobel Prize in Literature by the International Poets Academy of India
- Michio Mado, Japanese poet, received the international Hans Christian Andersen Medal in 1994 for his "lasting contribution to children's literature"
- Peter Chou, CEO of Supermicro
- Shen Jong-chin, Minister of Economic Affairs
- Chang Ching-chung, member of the Legislative Yuan (2005-2016)
- Suhon Lin, businessman and billionaire
- T.H. Tung, Taiwanese businessman and philanthropist, co-founder of Asus and its former vice chairman, and chairman of Pegatron
- Morin Kaku, Renowned Taiwanese-Japanese architect, lead designer of the Kasumigaseki Building, the first modern office skyscraper in Japan. He later founded the Kaku Morin Group architecture firm, had numerous projects both in Japan and Taiwan
- An-Pang Tsai (1958-2019), Academician of Academia Sinica (2018), 2015 distinguished professor of Tohoku University, receiver of 2014 Medal with Purple Ribbon awarded by the Government of Japan
- Robert C.Y Wu, founder of Eslite Bookstore, one of the largest bookstore chains in Taiwan and around Asia
- Peter Tsai, inventor of the N95 mask

== Transportation ==
The university is accessible from the Zhongxiao Xinsheng Station of Taipei Metro, a major transfer station for Bannan Line (Blue Line) and the Zhonghe–Xinlu Line (Orange Line). The station is also sub-named National Taipei University of Technology (臺北科大) in smaller text on station signage.

== See also ==
- List of universities in Taiwan
