= HTC U12+ =

Android smartphone manufactured by HTC

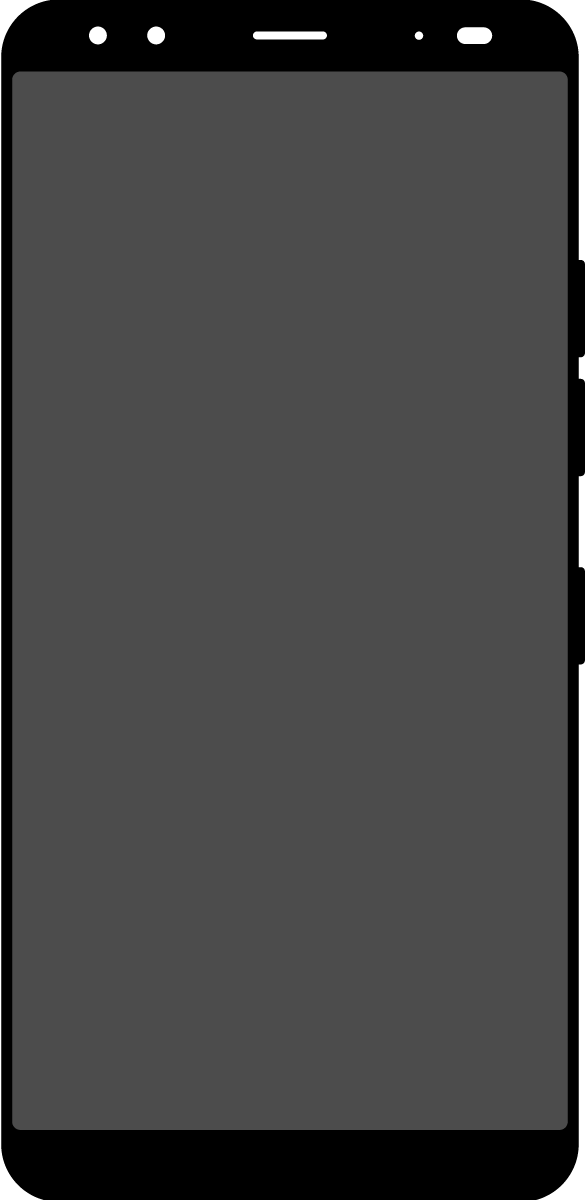
- Manufacturer: HTC
- Type: Smartphone
- Series: HTC U
- Predecessor: HTC U11; HTC U11+
- Successor: HTC U19e
- Dimensions: 156.6 mm (6.17 in) H; 73.9 mm (2.91 in) W; 8.7 mm (0.34 in) D
- Weight: 188 g (6.6 oz)
- Operating system: Original: Android 8.0 "Oreo" with HTC Sense 10 (with Treble); Current: Android 9.0 "Pie"
- System-on-chip: Qualcomm Snapdragon 845
- CPU: Octa-core (4×2.8 GHz & 4×1.7 GHz) Kryo
- GPU: Adreno 630
- Memory: 6 GB LPDDR4X RAM
- Storage: 64 or 128 GB
- Removable storage: microSD up to 2 TB
- Battery: 3,500 mAh Li-ion
- Display: 6 in (150 mm) Super LCD6 capacitive touchscreen with Corning Gorilla Glass 5, 2880×1440 resolution (~537 ppi pixel density)
- Data inputs: Capacitive touch screen Edge Sense 2
- Other: IP68 protection
- Website: Official website
- References: sources

The HTC U12+ is an Android smartphone manufactured and sold by HTC as part of the HTC U series. It was announced on 23 May 2018 and succeeds the HTC U11 and HTC U11+ smartphones.

== Specifications ==
=== Hardware ===
The HTC U12+ has 6 GB of RAM and runs on a 2.8 GHz Snapdragon 845 SoC, the latest and highest-end chip available from Qualcomm at the time. It comes with the option of 64 or 128 GB of internal UFS 2.1 storage, and a hybrid dual SIM system in which one slot can also be used for microSD storage of up to 2 TB. The screen is a 6-inch Super LCD 6 panel at Quad HD+ (2880×1440) resolution (573 ppi) with an 18:9 screen ration, covered with Gorilla Glass 5. The device is Quick Charge 4.0-compatible, and comes with a Quick Charge 3.0 charger.

HTC's BoomSound dual-speaker technology features on the device; it uses the earpiece as a tweeter and a bottom-firing speaker as a subwoofer. The phone uses four microphones that can isolate subjects in videos and automatically zoom up to 4×. As with the U11, a pair of USonic earbuds is included that connect via USB-C and incorporate a DAC and active noise cancellation. The U12+ can transmit 24-bit audio files via Bluetooth with aptX-HD.

The U12+ features Edge Sense pressure-sensitive sides, as on the U11 and Pixel 2, which allow it to perform various functions when squeezed. Edge Sense also features in pressure-sensitive technology in place of physical volume and other buttons, similar to Apple's Force Touch. When touched or tapped, the unmoving button-like protrusions give haptic feedback, and react in different ways to the level of pressure applied to them. There is a fingerprint scanner on the rear and facial recognition.

The U12+ continues the Liquid Surface design introduced by the U Ultra the previous year. The front and back are both glass, with an arched back and rounded corners. The lack of physical buttons helps the U12+ achieve a water- and dust-tight IP68 rating. Ceramic Black and Translucent Blue were the colours at launch; on the Translucent Blue version, internal parts such as the camera sensor are visible through the back. A Flame Red (or Solar Red) was announced for later in the year.

The smartphone has both rear- and front-facing dual cameras. The rear has a 12 MP main camera with a 1.4 μm HTC UltraPixel image sensor and an ƒ/1.75 aperture; a 1.0 μm 16 MP secondary camera accompanies it, with an ƒ/2.0 aperture. Features include a telephoto lens with 2× optical zoom and 10× digital zoom; OIS and EIS image stabilization; and HTC's UltraSpeed Autofocus 2 phase-detection and laser autofocus. The camera achieved a DxOMark score of 103, placing it second-highest amongst smartphone cameras at the time of its launch, behind the Huawei P20 Pro. (Note: The Huawei P20 Pro had a DxOMark score of 109.) Video can be shot at up to 4K resolution (3840×2160) at up to 60 fps in h.265 format, or slow motion at 240 fps at 1080p (1920×1080). When zooming, HTC's Sonic Zoom technology focuses the device's four microphones on the area zoomed in on. (Note: HTC called this technology Acoustic Focus on previous devices.) The front-facing cameras both have 1.12 μm 8MP sensors with ƒ/2.0 apertures and have an 84° wide-angle field of view (FOV). They have EIS but not OIS. Both sets of cameras enable altering the point of focus after the image has been shot to achieve a bokeh effect. HDR Boost 2 improves image quality under low-lighting conditions.

It has no 3.5 mm jack; earphones are connected to the USB-C port. It has no notch around the front-facing camera, and no wireless charging.

=== Software ===
The HTC U12+ ships with Android 8.0 with an overlay of HTC Sense UI. It features Project Treble, which enables faster updates after new versions of Android are released. Both the Amazon Alexa and Google Assistant virtual assistants come pre-installed. (Note: In China, both are replaced with Baidu Assistant.)

The device's Edge Sense 2 software controls its pressure-sensitive hardware features. It recognizes squeezes and taps of different pressures. The actions are configurable; the default action is to shrink the screen on a double-tap for one-handed operation. Smart Rotate suppresses auto-rotate when it detects the user's hand positions have not changed, such as when they lie down in bed. There are no gestures available for the fingerprint sensor.

== History ==
Most of the U12+'s specifications were leaked before its official launch on 23 May 2018. Though it bears a "+" in its name, suggesting it is a larger-size model as the U11+ was a larger version of the U11, HTC did not announce a "U12." The slogan for the U12+ is "Live on the Edge".
