= HTC Exodus =

Mobile phone

- Compatible networks: 4G LTE
- Operating system: Android O.
- CPU: Qualcomm® Snapdragon™ 845
- Memory: 6GB - DDR4x RAM
- Storage: 128GB - UFS2.1 Storage
- Water resistance: IP68

HTC Exodus 1 is an entry level 2019 HTC U series engineering based Android OS powered blockchain-secured "hardware cryptocurrency wallet" mobile phone developed by HTC Corporation. Its default web browser application is Brave and it runs DApps through a partnership with Opera.

Data such as keys to cryptocurrencies can be recovered via a social key recovery mechanism. To do this, the user names a few trustworthy people in advance, each of whom must download an app. The information is then pieced together using a secret release process and distributed to these contacts. If necessary, the user only has to query and compile the partial information to regain access to his deposits.
