= Trump Mobile =

American mobile virtual network operator

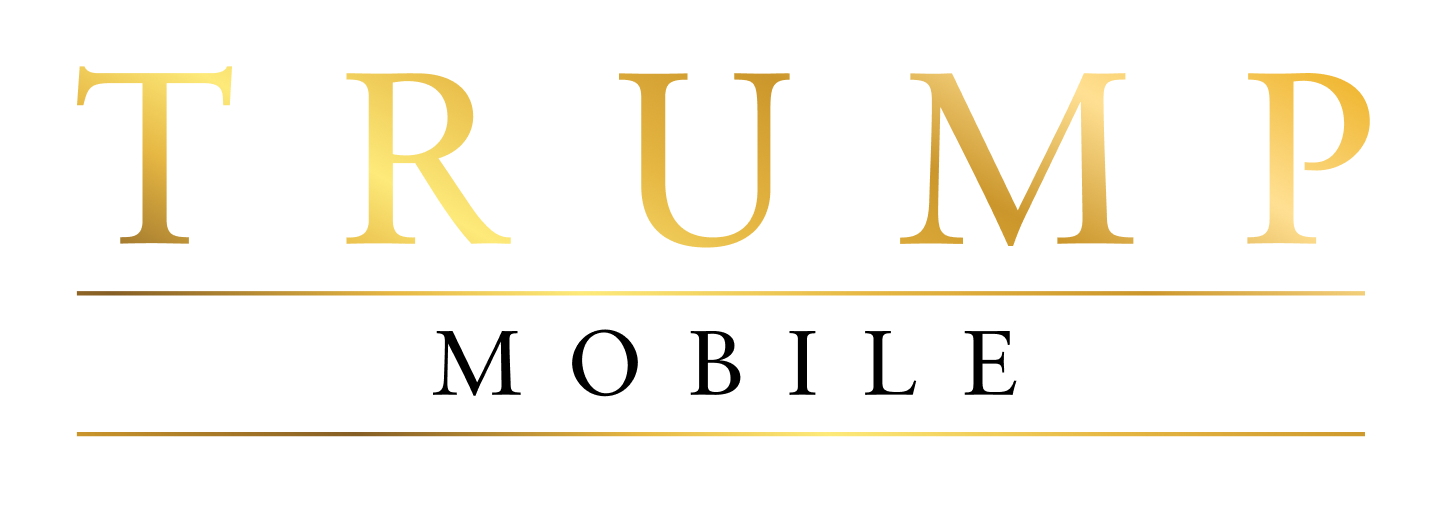
- Industry: Wireless telecommunications
- Founded: June 16, 2025; 17 months ago
- Founders: Donald Trump Jr.; Eric Trump
- Headquarters: Miami, Florida
- Products: T1 Phone; T1 Mobile Service
- Owner: T1 Mobile
- Website: trumpmobile.com

Trump Mobile is an American mobile virtual network operator (MVNO) owned by T1 Mobile that uses a licensed brand from the Trump Organization. (Note: Trump Mobile is not distributed or sold by the Trump Organization.) It was founded on June 16, 2025, by Donald Trump Jr. and Eric Trump.

== History ==
The brand's creation was announced on June 16, 2025, at Trump Tower in New York City by Donald Trump Jr. and Eric Trump, Donald Trump's sons. This date was chosen because it was the 10th anniversary of the announcement of Trump's 2016 presidential campaign. At launch, the company's website displayed a coverage map with the Gulf of Mexico. As this was contrary to Trump's executive order to call it the "Gulf of America;" the map was removed from the website. It was initially announced that the smartphones would be entirely manufactured within the United States, but about a week later, after analysts pointed to the lack of U.S. manufacturing facilities, that promise was also removed from the website.

The T1 Phone is arguably vaporware, as its launch has been significantly delayed. The initial launch date of September 2025 was changed to "later this year [2025];" but in December, customer service representatives cited the government shutdown as a reason for the delay of the launch, and they suggested it would be available in January 2026. In mid-January the website asserted that the phone would be released "later this year," a statement that had been present on the site since the previous year.

The company announced in June 2025 that the phone would be US-made. While the assertion of a US-built phone quickly disappeared after the announcement, Trump Mobile's website later announced that the phone was "designed with American values in mind" and "shaped by American innovation."

On a Google Meet interview on February 7, 2026, Trump Mobile executives Don Hendrickson and Eric Thomas showed Dominic Preston of The Verge a new prototype of the T1 Phone, which differs from the images on the Trump Mobile website. The showcased physical prototype moved away from initial iPhone-style renders to a boxier aesthetics reminiscent of a Samsung Galaxy flagship device. Hendrickson and Thomas stated that the T1 Phone would run on a Qualcomm Snapdragon 7 series chipset, have a 5,000 mAh battery and 512GB of storage, and be compatible with microSD cards of up to 1TB. The final pricing was yet to be determined, but expected to exceed the amount of $499 announced in June 2025, a point the managers admitted would likely be impossible to maintain. While they did not specify a launch date, both executives said that the T1 Phone is "coming soon." The device has reportedly passed FCC certification and was awaiting certification from T-Mobile, which was anticipated to be completed by mid-March.

The terms and conditions were updated on April 6, 2026, to state that the initial $100 payment did not guarantee delivery, only that customers would have the opportunity to buy the phone if it was manufactured. On April 20, 2026, the official website underwent a complete redesign, replacing the Samsung-influenced design with a third layout. Experts from Tech Advisor, iFixit and other technology media platforms observed that the newly updated specifications and appearance were identical to the HTC U24 Pro, a mid-range smartphone manufactured in Taiwan by HTC in 2024. The finalized hardware retained its distinctive golden color, and had a 6.78-inch AMOLED 120 Hz display and a 3.5mm headphone jack. The parent entity behind the hardware was identified as Smart Gadgets Global, a mostly vacant corporate entity overseen by Trump Mobile executive Eric Thomas, which secured FCC authorization for the device in January 2026.

=== May 2026 delivery ===
By mid-May 2026, initial promotional demo units were delivered to some technology websites. Media reviewers noted that the gold-colored rear panels featured an engraved American flag that erroneously had 11 horizontal stripes, instead of the actual 13.

Around this time, independent cybersecurity researcher "10N" identified a major security vulnerability within the Trump Mobile customer web portal, which left personal user profiles publicly accessible. After failing to get a response from corporate management, the researcher leaked the database details to prominent YouTube commentators, including Coffeezilla, who publicly exposed the breach. The security vulnerability was reportedly fixed afterwards. The final production hardware arrived with the social network application Truth Social pre-installed.

As of early May 2026, the phone had yet to be certified by T-Mobile, and no T1 phones had been delivered to customers. Press sources reported based on estimates that some 600,000 customers had put down the $100 deposit to secure the phone. While the company said that deposits would be refundable in full if customers would rather not wait, its terms and conditions stated that refunds would be made if it "cancels or discontinues the Device offering prior to sale." However, data exposed during the website security breach revealed that the platform had logged only about 10,000 unique customers who had placed a total of about 30,000 pre-orders, contradicting previous estimates. Later that month, Trump Mobile began shipping production units to waiting pre-order customers, ending the extensive launch delays. In an emailed statement on May 13, 2026, Trump Mobile CEO Pat O'Brien announced that shipping would commence that week, attributing the months-long delay to stringent quality assurance and components testing protocols. By the end of May, tech journalists from NBC and CNET had received their phones.

In September 2026 the company was hit with another data breach, with over 3,000 customers having their data stolen.

== Products ==
=== T1 Phone ===
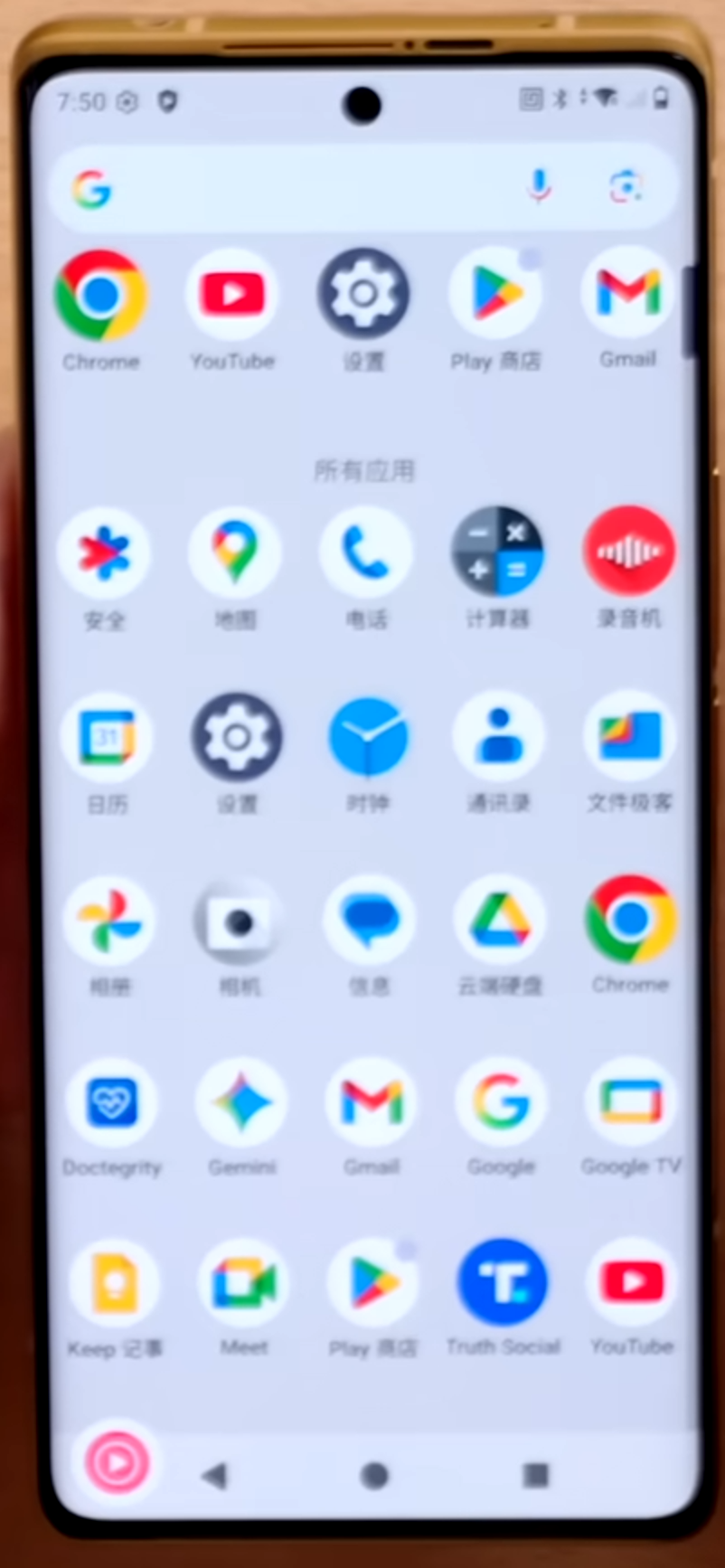
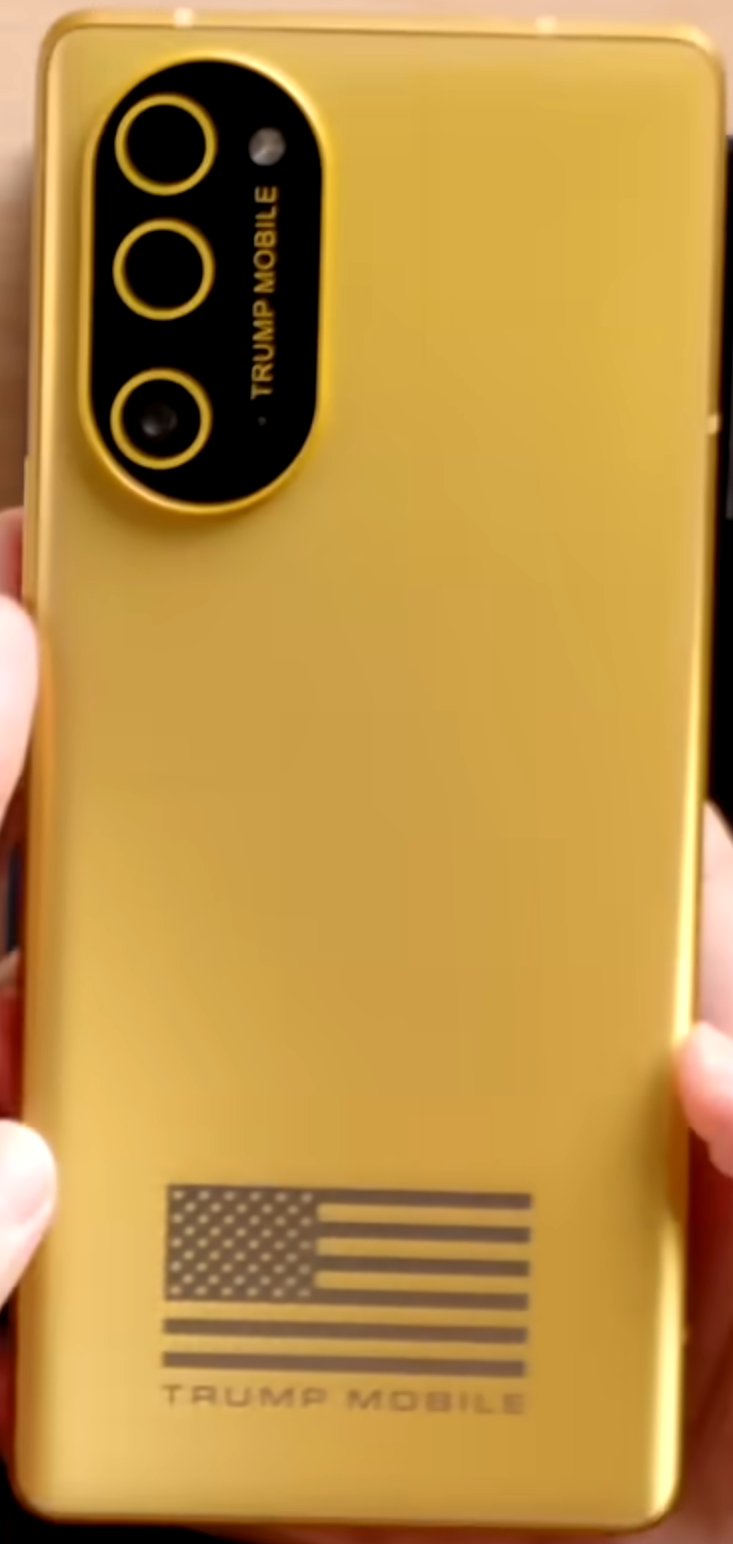
Front and back sides of T1 Phone

The T1 Phone is a gold-colored smartphone with the majority of its components shown to be made abroad. The initially released images showed it to be a reskinned version of the Chinese-made Wingtech Revvl 7 Pro 5G. An updated design from early 2026 closely resembles the U24 Pro, initially released in 2024. The final version of the phone that was released to tech journalists was a nearly identical, drop-in compatible reskin of the HTC U24 Pro, with fully interchangeable mainboards.

=== T1 Mobile ===
T1 Mobile is a mobile virtual network operator (MVNO) with free calls to over 100 countries and a cost of $47.45 a month, called "The 47 Plan.” The cost is a reference to Trump being counted as both the 45th and 47th president. T1 Mobile MVNO is managed by Florida-based Liberty Mobile Wireless, founded in 2018 by Matthew Lopatin, that uses the T-Mobile network.

== Reception ==
Wired noted that the phones displayed on the Trump Mobile website looked like renders rather than working prototypes, and noted a different section of the website appeared to show a render of an iPhone. In 404 Media, Joseph Cox reported technical and billing issues when pre-ordering the T1 Phone, including incorrect charge amounts and failure to obtain the shipping address. Cox subsequently reported that Trump Mobile had made unauthorized recurring charges, and had failed to provide customer service assistance. Macworld expressed concern that Trump Mobile's 'renewed' iPhones were very poor value.

Democrats, ethics groups, some members of Congress, and media critics largely reacted negatively with skepticism and concern to the launch of Trump Mobile, raising ethics, consumer-protection, and marketing-accuracy concerns. Critics and watchdogs said that the venture blurred Trump's private business and public roles, and represented a conflict of interest. Lawmakers worried about carrier partnerships and oversight. House Democrats publicly pressed questions about the role of major carriers (and T-Mobile specifically) in any Trump-branded service, and potential policy or contract implications. California Governor Gavin Newsom mocked the T1 Phone's failure to launch on its scheduled release date; he described the T1 Phone as a fraud.

== See also ==
- Trump Media & Technology Group, media company owned by Donald Trump
- Freedom Phone, cell phone targeted towards conservatives with access to "censored" apps
- Patriot Mobile, a conservative MVNO
