= HTC U11 =

Android-powered smartphone manufactured and sold by HTC

HTC U11 HTC U11+

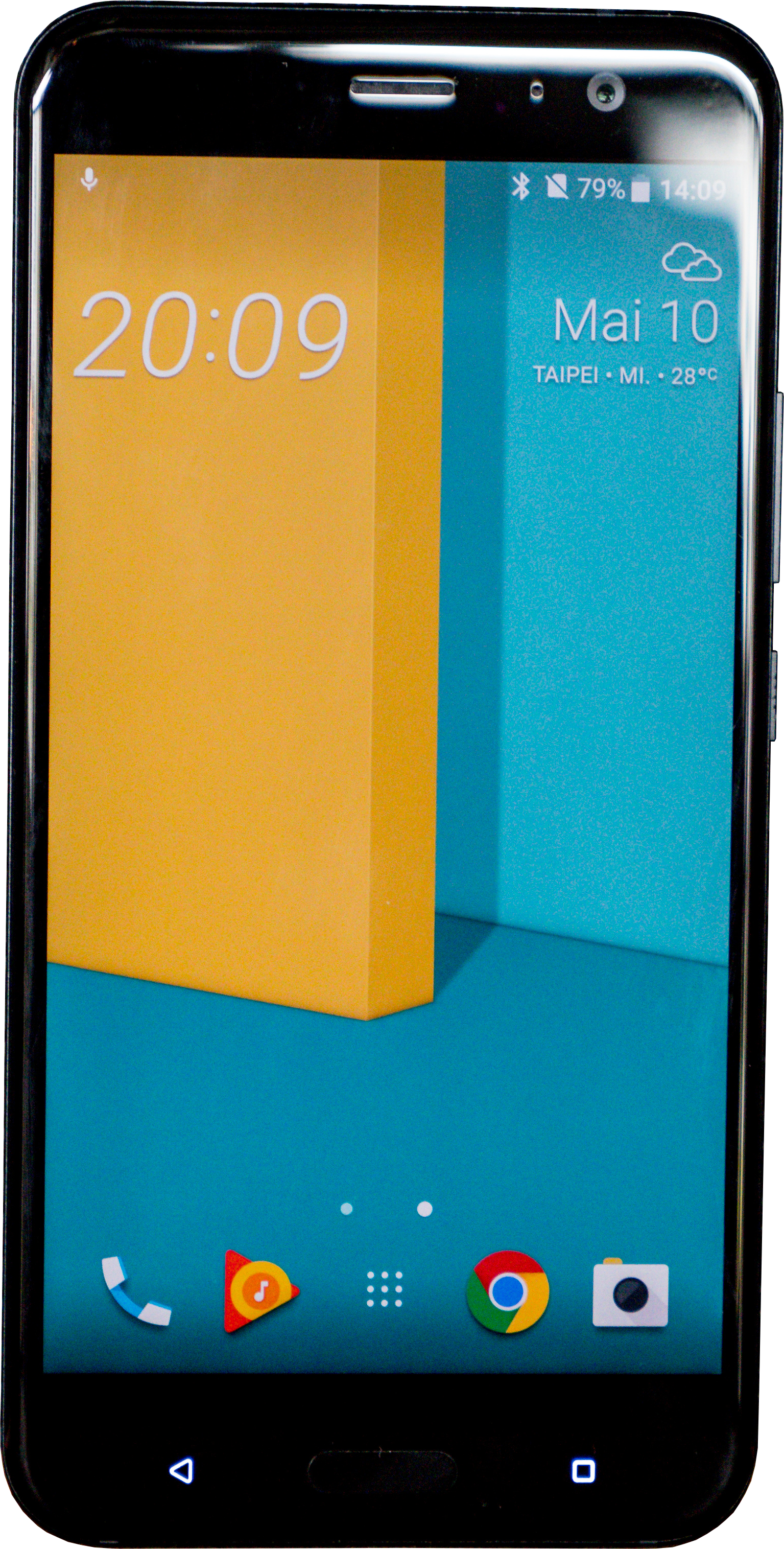
- HTC U11
- Manufacturer: HTC
- Type: Smartphone
- Series: HTC U
- First released: U11: June 2017; 9 years ago U11+: November 2017; 8 years ago
- Predecessor: HTC 10
- Successor: HTC U12+
- Related: HTC U Play, HTC U Ultra
- Dimensions: U11: 153.9 mm (6.06 in) H 75.9 mm (2.99 in) W 7.9 mm (0.31 in) D U11+: 158.5 mm (6.24 in) H 74.9 mm (2.95 in) W 8.5 mm (0.33 in) D
- Weight: U11: 169 g (6.0 oz); U11+: 188 g (6.6 oz)
- Operating system: U11: Android 7.1 "Nougat" with HTC Sense 9.0; Android 8.0 "Oreo" with HTC Sense 9.0 (without Treble); Android 9.0 "Pie"; U11+: Android 8.0 "Oreo" (with Treble); Android 9 "Pie"
- System-on-chip: Qualcomm Snapdragon 835
- CPU: Octa-core (4×2.45 GHz & 4×1.9 GHz) Kryo
- GPU: Adreno 540
- Memory: 4 or 6 GB LPDDR4X RAM
- Storage: 64 or 128 GB
- Removable storage: microSD up to 2 TB
- Battery: U11: 3,000 mAh Li-ion; U11+: 3,930 mAh Li-ion
- Rear camera: 12 MP (1.4 μm), f/1.7, OIS, UltraSpeed autofocus, dual-LED (dual tone) flash, geo-tagging, touch focus, face detection, auto-HDR, panorama
- Front camera: U11: 16 MP, 1080p, auto-HDR; U11+: 8 MP, 1080p, auto-HDR
- Display: U11: 5.5 in (140 mm) Super LCD5 capacitive touchscreen with Corning Gorilla Glass 5, 2560×1440 resolution (~534 ppi pixel density); U11+: 6 in (150 mm) Super LCD6 capacitive touchscreen with Corning Gorilla Glass 5, 2880×1440 resolution (~538 ppi pixel density)
- Sound: HTC BoomSound Hi-Fi edition speakers HTC USonic with Active Noise Cancellation; 3D Audio recording with 4 microphones Hi-Res audio stereo recording Hi-Res audio certified
- Connectivity: Wi-Fi: 802.11 a/b/g/n/ac, dual-band, Wi-Fi Direct, DLNA, hotspot Bluetooth: v4.2, A2DP, LE; GPS: Yes, with A-GPS, GLONASS, BDS; NFC: Yes; USB: v3.1, Type-C 1.0 reversible connector (supports DisplayPort)
- Data inputs: Capacitive touch screen Edge Sense
- Other: U11: IP67 protection U11+: IP68 protection
- Website: Official website
- References: sources

The HTC U11 is an Android-based smartphone manufactured and sold by HTC as part of the HTC U series. It was announced on 16 May 2017 and succeeds the HTC 10 smartphone. In the United States, the HTC U11's major carrier is Sprint; however, it is also compatible with unlocked carriers, such as AT&T, T-Mobile, and Verizon.

On May 23, 2018, HTC presented its successor, the HTC U12+.

== Specifications ==
=== Hardware ===
The HTC U11 has a glass unibody-like design with an aluminium frame that includes pressure-sensitive points for the implementation of HTC Edge Sense. This enables users to control or navigate several functions by pressing the edges of the metal frame. It is fitted with a 5.5-inch Super LCD 5 Quad HD (2560×1440 pixels) display. The front glass is made of Corning Gorilla Glass 5 while the rear glass uses Gorilla Glass 3. HTC U11 features a 3000 mAh battery with Quick Charge 3.0.

The rear camera is a 12 megapixels sensor with 1.4 μm pixels and an f/1.7 aperture; it also includes OIS and Ultraspeed Autofocus. The front camera is a 16 megapixels sensor with an f/2.0 aperture and includes EIS.

The HTC U11 has 4 microphones for 24-bit 360-degree audio recording. It also has HTC BoomSound Hi-Fi edition stereo speakers, with the headphone serving as the tweeter and the bottom-firing speaker as the woofer. Dust and water resistance are included with an IP67 certification.

The phone ships with the Qualcomm Snapdragon 835 chipset and includes either 4 GB RAM and 64 GB of storage or 6 GB RAM and 128 GB of storage.

=== Software ===
The HTC U11 ships with Android 7.1 Nougat with an overlay of HTC Sense UI. HTC is also currently rolling out Android 8.0 Oreo (without the Treble feature for device-independent system updates) updates for the phone via OTA. Google Assistant, Amazon Alexa and Baidu Duer (China only) are pre-installed. Alexa only became available on 17 July 2017. HTC Sense Companion is installed to make personalized suggestions by learning from daily routines and suggestions based on the user's location.

== Sales ==
On 15 June 2017, Chang Chia-lin, the president of HTC's smartphone and connected device division, stated that the HTC U11 had been selling better than its predecessors, the HTC One M9 and the HTC 10.

== HTC U11+ ==
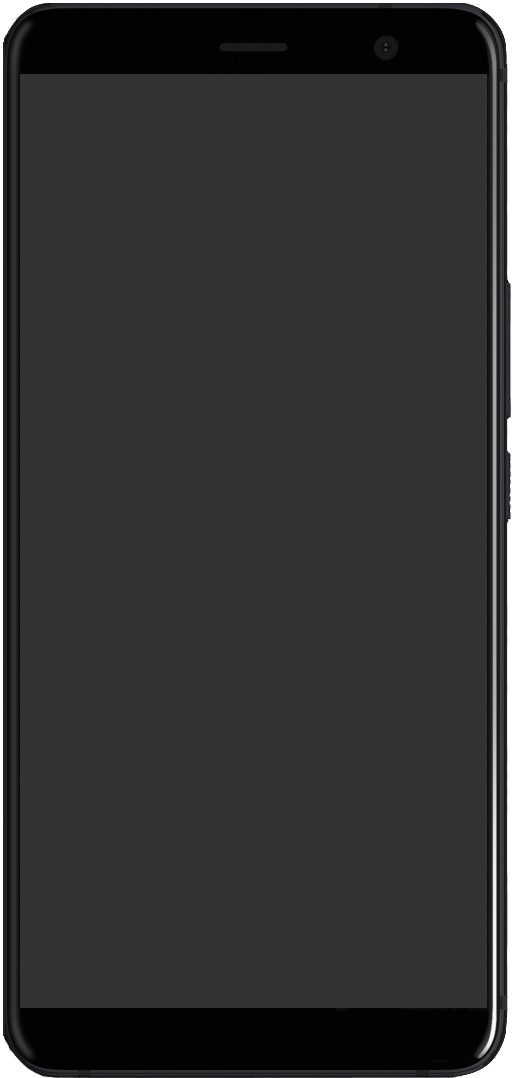
HTC U11+

HTC unveiled an upgraded version of the U11, the U11+, on November 2, 2017. It features a 6-inch 2:1 display (marketed as 18:9) with thinner bezels, a larger battery, a rear-mounted fingerprint reader, IP68 certification for dust and water resistance, and is pre-loaded with Android 8.0 Oreo. The Verge reported via internal sources that the U11+ had previously been developed as a successor to the original Pixel XL smartphone HTC had developed with Google, under the codename "Muskie", but that it had been shelved in favor of a version produced by LG instead, and was re-engineered into an update to the U11.

== HTC U11 Life ==
The U11 Life is a mid-range smartphone unveiled by HTC alongside the U11+ on the same day. It features a 5.2-inch display, IP67 certification for water and dust resistance, 73 hours of battery life, and ships with Android 8.0 Oreo. Unlike the U11+, the U11 Life has a smaller display and comes shipped with the 4th Generation Android One platform, which it joined on September 13, 2017. It is powered by the Qualcomm Snapdragon 630 SoC with 3 or 4 GB of RAM.
