= HTC U Play =

Android smartphone

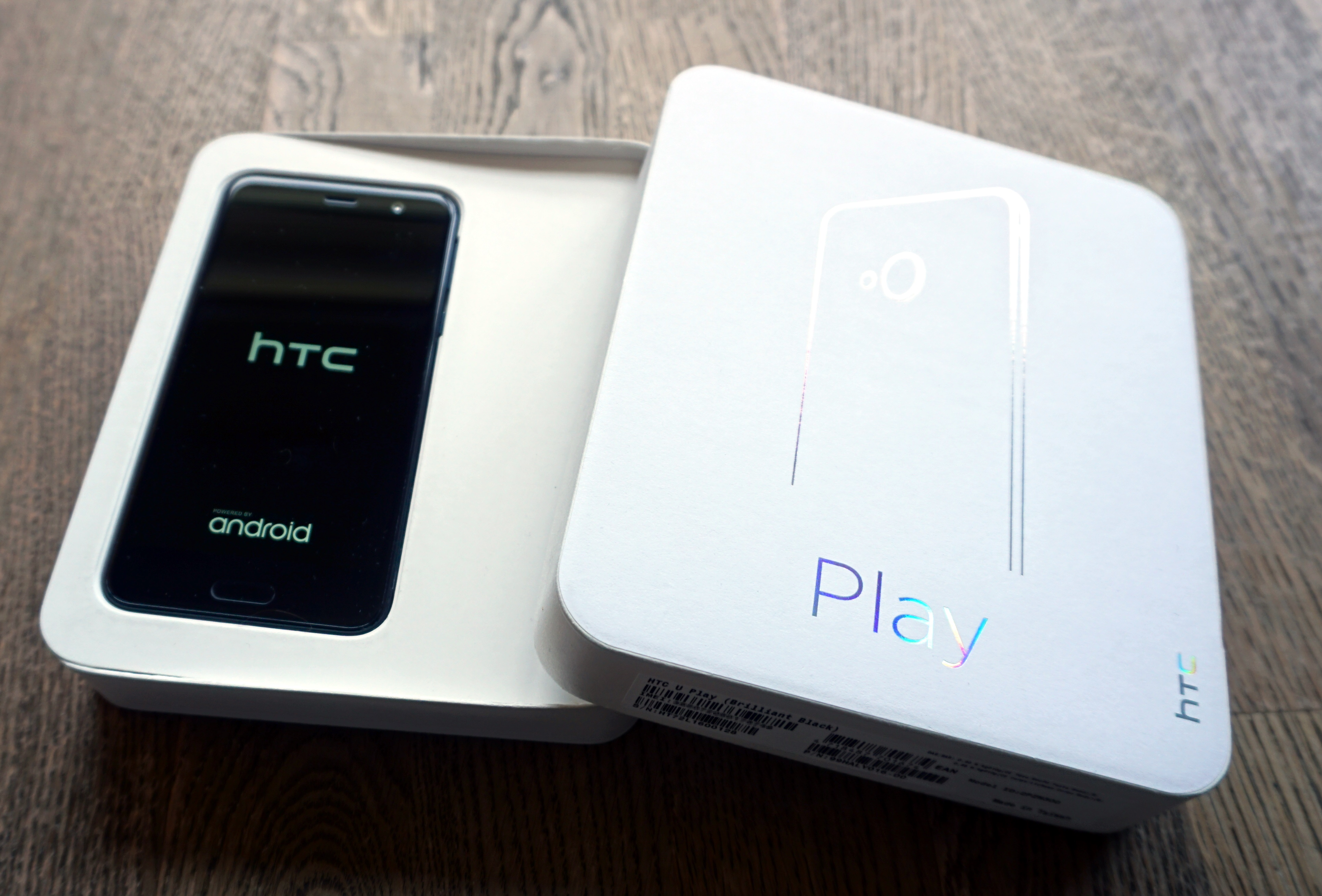
- Brand: HTC U
- Manufacturer: HTC
- Type: Smartphone
- Series: HTC U
- Related: HTC U Ultra; HTC U11
- Operating system: Android "Marshmallow" 6.0 with HTC Sense
- System-on-chip: Mediatek Helio P10
- GPU: Mali-T860MP2
- Memory: 3 or 4 GB
- Storage: 32 or 64 GB
- Removable storage: MicroSD up to 2TB
- Battery: Non-removable Li-Ion 2500 mAh battery
- References: source1source2

The HTC U Play is a mid-range Android smartphone manufactured and sold by HTC as part of the HTC U series. It was announced alongside the HTC U Ultra on January 12, 2017.

== Specifications ==
=== Hardware ===
The HTC U Play features a curved glass back with an aluminum frame. It includes a non-removable 2500 mAH battery and a 5.2-inch IPS LCD with Gorilla Glass. It comes with either 3 GB RAM and 32 GB of storage or 4 GB RAM and 64 GB of storage. The HTC U Play also supports a microSD card.

=== Software ===
The HTC U Play shipped with Android 6.0 Marshmallow with the HTC Sense UI.

== Release ==
The device was released on March 1, 2017 in the United Kingdom and on March 8, 2017 in Australia. The device was also released in some other countries around the globe.
