= IHTC =

iHTC mobile phones are shanzhai (counterfeit) clones of HTC mobile phones. The iHTC clones are frequently sold in China and Hong Kong and can be confused with genuine HTC phones.

iHTC's Windows Mobile phones have used the Huawei HiSilicon K3 chipset.
