= Suhon Lin =

Suhon Lin (Chinese: 林書鴻; pinyin: Lín Shūhóng; born 1 August 1928) is a Taiwanese billionaire and co-founder of the Chang Chun Group, a petrochemical company.

== Education ==
Lin graduated from what became the National Taipei University of Technology.

== Career ==
With M. K. Liao and Tseng Shin-yi, Lin founded the Chang Chun Group in 1949. The company's name means "long spring" in Chinese, and was chosen to describe the strong bond between the three business partners.

Lin placed twenty-third on "Taiwan's 40 Richest" published by Forbes in June 2008, with a net worth of US$1.15 billion. He ranked twenty-fourth in 2009, when his fortune was valued at US$800 million. By 2011, Lin was worth US$1.6 billion, and placed seventeenth on Forbes' list of Taiwanese billionaires. Lin earned the nickname "the Edison of petrochemicals" for his dedication to research and development.
