= Peter Chou =

Taiwanese businessman and electronics engineer

- 周永明
- Born: Win Than (ဝင်းသန်း); 24 November 1956 (age 69); Mandalay, Burma
- Education: National Taiwan Ocean University (BS); National Chengchi University (MBA)
- Occupations: Businessman, electronics engineer
- Employer(s): HTC; Digital Equipment Corporation
- Awards: National Taiwan Ocean University honorary engineering Ph.D. (2011); National Taiwan Ocean University Distinguished Alumni (2009)

Peter Chou (Chinese: 周永明) or Win Than (Burmese: ဝင်းသန်း) (born 24 November 1956) is a Taiwanese businessman and electronics engineer. He is co-founder of HTC and a former CEO of the company. Chou founded HTC with Cher Wang and H.T.Cho (卓火土) before being named CEO of HTC in 2004, succeeding H.T.Cho. Chou would later serve as head of HTC Future Development Lab starting early 2015, with Cher Wang succeeding as CEO.

== Early life and education ==
Chou was born in Mandalay, Burma (now Myanmar), in 1956 to an ethnic Chinese family. His father worked in Burma's jade industry.

After attending Mandalay Regional College, Chou went to Taiwan and continued to study part-time in the car audio company assembling electronic parts. He graduated from National Taiwan Ocean University in 1985 with a Bachelor of Science (B.S.) in electrical engineering. In 1987, Chou became a senior engineer at Digital Equipment Corporation; in 1997, HP merged with DEC.

In 1997, he founded HTC with Cher Wang and H.T.Cho (卓火土). Chou had received an Executive MBA from National Chengchi University in 2003 after co-founding HTC. He attended Harvard Business School's six-week Advanced Management Program.

In 2013, HTC launched one of the first smartphones to offer commercial off-the-shelf compatibility with Burmese language text.

== Career ==
Before HTC

Prior to joining HTC, Chou spent 10 years with Digital Equipment Corporation (DEC), eventually serving as director before DEC's later merger with HP Corporation.

HTC Corporation

Chou was asked to join the founding of HTC Corporation by former superior H.T. Cho in 1997, and was named CEO in 2004. During his term as CEO he created the first 4G-capable smartphone and one of the first smartphones to offer commercial off-the-shelf compatibility with Burmese language text.

Cher Wang succeeding the mantle as CEO of HTC Corporation in early 2015.

Chou has received various awards, including Laptop Magazine's fifth most influential mobile executive, the Wireless Week Leadership Award for extraordinary achievements in mobile communications, and T3 Magazine's thirteenth most influential technology executive.

== Personal life ==
In his spare time, Chou enjoys reading, appreciating all forms of art and listening to classical music.
