= HTC U Ultra =

2017 Android smartphone

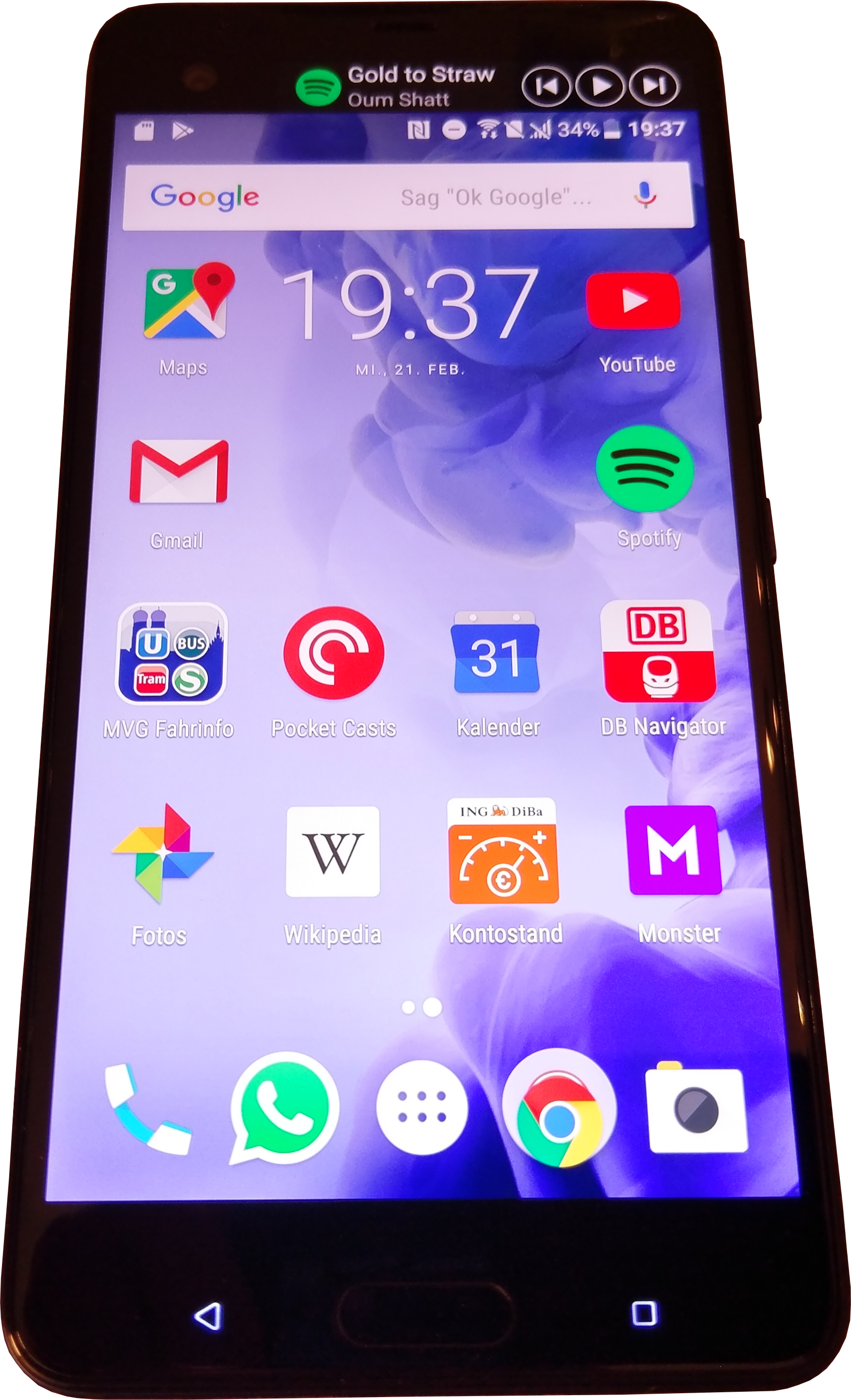
- Brand: HTC U
- Manufacturer: HTC
- Type: Smartphone
- Series: HTC U
- First released: February 2017; 9 years ago
- Related: HTC U Play; HTC U11
- Dimensions: 162.4 mm (6.39 in) H 79.8 mm (3.14 in) W 8 mm (0.31 in) D
- Weight: 170 g (6.0 oz)
- Operating system: Android "Nougat" 7.0; Android "Oreo" 8.0 with HTC Sense 8.0; Unofficial: Android 12 via LineageOS
- System-on-chip: Qualcomm Snapdragon 821
- CPU: Quad-core (2x2.15 GHz Kryo & 2x1.6 GHz Kryo)
- GPU: Adreno 530
- Memory: 4 GB RAM
- Storage: 64 or 128 GB
- Removable storage: MicroSD up to 2TB
- Battery: Non-removable Li-Ion 3000 mAh battery
- Rear camera: 12 MP, f/1.8, 26mm, OIS, laser & phase detection autofocus, dual-LED (dual tone) flash 1/2.3 in. sensor size, 1.55μm pixel size, geo-tagging, touch focus, face detection, Auto-HDR, panorama
- Front camera: 16 MP, 1080p, Auto-HDR
- Display: 5.7 inch Super LCD5 capacitive touchscreen with Corning Gorilla Glass 5 for the 64 GB model and Sapphire crystal glass for the 128 GB model. 1440 × 2560 pixels (~513 ppi pixel density)
- External display: 160 × 1040 pixels, 2.05 inches
- Sound: HTC USonic; HTC BoomSound™ Hi-Fi edition 3D Audio recording with 4 microphones Hi-Res audio stereo recording Hi-Res audio certified
- Connectivity: Wi-Fi: 802.11 a/b/g/n/ac, dual-band, Wi-Fi Direct, DLNA, hotspot Bluetooth: v4.2, A2DP, LE; GPS: Yes, with A-GPS, GLONASS, BDS; NFC: Yes; USB: v3.1, Type-C 1.0 reversible connector
- Codename: U1
- Website: Official website
- References: sources

The HTC U Ultra is an Android-based smartphone manufactured and sold by HTC. It was released in February 2017. It was one of the first two devices in the new HTC U series (the other being the HTC U Play).

== Specifications ==
=== Hardware ===
The HTC U Ultra has a glass body, a non-removable 3000 mAh battery, a 5.7-inch capacitive touchscreen, and a 2.05-inch secondary display, similar to the LG V20. The rear camera features a 12-megapixel sensor with optical image stabilization, a dual-LED flash, and an f/1.8 aperture, with support for HDR. The front camera has a 16-megapixel sensor that shoots 1080p video and supports auto-HDR. Internal storage is either 64 or 128 gigabytes with support for microSD cards up to 256 GB, and it weighs 170 grams.

=== Software ===
The HTC U Ultra ships with Android 7.0 Nougat overlaid with the HTC Sense UI. It is upgradable to Android 8.0 Oreo.

== Reception ==
The HTC U Ultra received mixed to negative reviews.

Android Police's David Ruddock liked the phone's large size and the high-gloss glass construction of the phone as well as the "lighter touch" of HTC's Sense skin that "includes some useful software tweaks", but lamented its lack of a headphone jack, its "poor battery life" which he attributed to the "awful" screen to battery ratio, its lack of carrier support and no ruggedization features and its $750 price, which he felt was "simply way too much".

Andrew Martonik of Android Central praised the phone's "fantastic" performance, the "great" screen, "stunning" hardware, lack of bloatware the fact that the phone came unlocked and that it "absolutely nails the basics" but derided its "2016-level camera performance", lack of a headphone jack, the lack of utility for the second screen, no water resistance and the phone being too big for most hands. In the quick take, he said, "HTC continues to get the basics right with flagships. The U Ultra has a great screen, amazing build quality, and stunning design. You get just about every spec you'd expect, and the day-to-day performance is fantastic, with a super-smooth software experience. Unfortunately, HTC's camera performance once again lags behind the pack, its secondary display is all but useless, and there's no headphone jack or water resistance — all in a phone that's charging a premium price of $749."

Writing for ZDNet, Matthew Miller singled out the gorilla glass on the front and back, the "high quality fit and finish", the "vibrant" BoomSound speakers and the "good" quality of the included earbuds as pros, but panned its large size, lack of a headphone jack, no water resistance and "average battery life and called the back a "fingerprint magnet". In the conclusion he stated "As it is, there are just too many compromises at the $749 price for me to commit to one now."

== Further information ==
- Android Authority Review
- The Verge — HTC’s sapphire U Ultra is more scratch resistant than any iPhone or Galaxy phone (Sapphire U Ultra)

Preceded by None	HTC U Ultra; 2017	Succeeded by None
