= Charles Liang =

Taiwanese-American business executive

- 梁見後
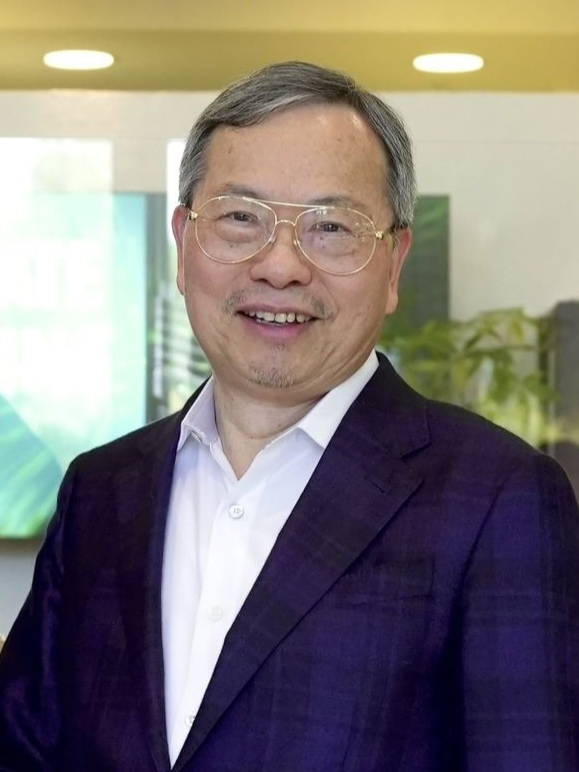
- Liang in 2025
- Born: Liang Chien-Hou; 1956 or 1957 (age 69–70); Chiayi, Taiwan
- Education: National Taiwan University of Science and Technology (BS); University of Texas at Arlington (MS)
- Title: Co-founder, chairman, president and CEO, Supermicro
- Spouse: Sara Liu
- Children: 5

Charles Liang Chien-Hou (Chinese: 梁見後; born 1956 or 1957) is a Taiwanese billionaire businessman and electrical engineer. He is the co-founder (with his wife Sara Liu), chairman, president and CEO of Supermicro, an information technology company based in San Jose, California.

== Early life and education ==
Liang was born in Chiayi, Taiwan. He graduated from the National Taiwan University of Science and Technology with a Bachelor of Science in electrical engineering and earned a Master of Science in electrical engineering from the University of Texas at Arlington in the United States. As a student, Liang was interested in medical technologies and worked on "developing computerized systems to help diagnose illnesses".

== Career ==
After graduating, Liang took on a job teaching at his alma mater, but left sometime in the 1980s to pursue his passions. He worked on a chip design for a healthcare company that utilized artificial intelligence, which he called an "AI Processor". From July 1991 to August 1993, Liang was the president and chief design engineer of Micro Center Computer, a motherboard design and manufacturing company. Among other roles, Liang worked for Chips and Technologies and Suntek Information International Group, serving as an engineer and project leader.

In 1993, Liang co-founded Supermicro alongside his wife and company treasurer, Chiu-Chu Liu, known as Sara. The business began as a five-person operation run by Liang. In 1996, Supermicro opened a manufacturing subsidiary, Ablecom, in Taiwan, which is run by Charles's brothers, Steve Liang and Bill Liang. Charles and his wife own close to 31 percent of Ablecom, while Steve Liang and other members of the family own close to 50 percent. Supermicro's shift towards green computing was in part influenced by Liang taking his family to watch the movie The Day After Tomorrow, where the film led to further conversations about energy consumption.

As of January 2024, Liang's stake in Supermicro is estimated at $3.3 billion. Liang holds several patents for server technology.

=== Green Earth Foundation ===
Liang is the founder of the Green Earth Foundation, a nonprofit organization focused on increasing forestation worldwide. In 2022, the Green Earth Foundation purchased nearly 200 acres of land in Milpitas, California, formerly known as Rancho Higuera. The foundation also seeks to plant drought-resistant trees in the Sahara Desert, supporting the Great Green Wall initiative.

== Personal life ==
Liang is married to Sara Liu and they have five children.

=== Net worth ===
| Year | Forbes Billionaire List | |
| Year | Rank | Net worth (US$) |
|---|---|---|
| 2024 | 477 | $6.1 billion |
| 2025 | 1,763 | $2 billion |
| 2026 | 2,100 | $1.1 billion |
