= Supermicro =

American supplier of servers and other information technology products

Super Micro Computer, Inc.

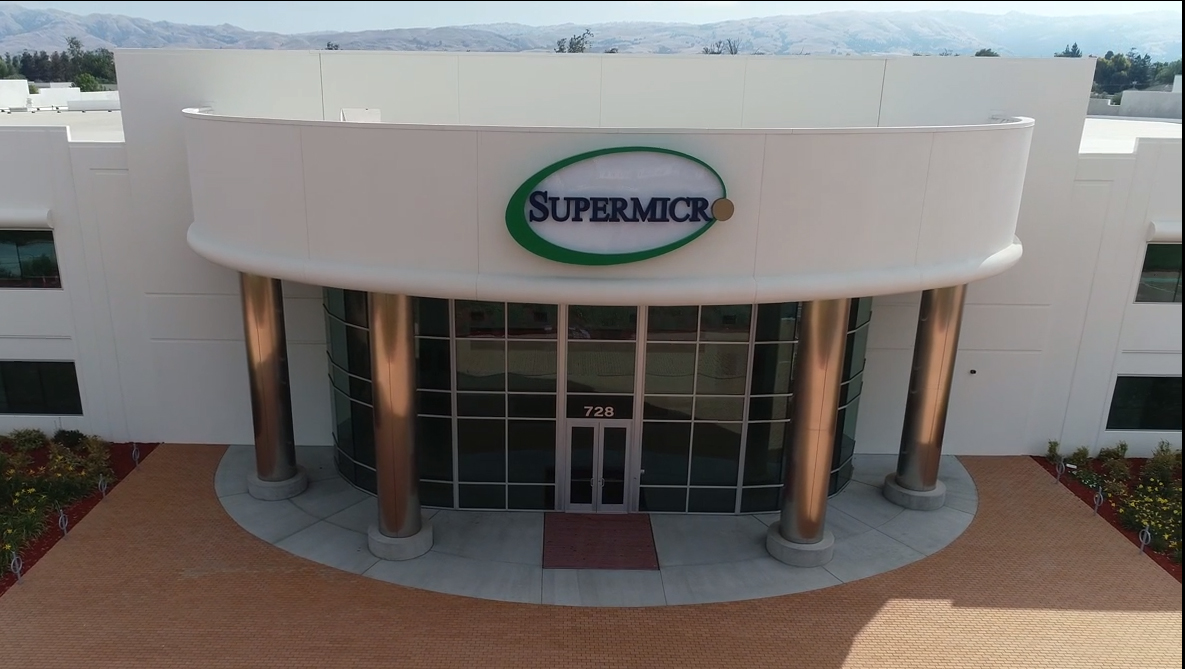
- Trade name: Supermicro
- Type: Public
- Traded as: Nasdaq: SMCI; S&P 500 component
- Industry: Information technology
- Founded: 1993; 33 years ago
- Founders: Charles Liang; Sara Liu; Wally Liaw
- Headquarters: San Jose, California, U.S.
- Number of locations: 11
- Key people: Charles Liang (chairman, president and CEO); Mark Long (CFO); Vik Malyala (CBO); Don Clegg (SVP of Worldwide Sales); Jin "Tom" Xiao (SVP of Operations)
- Products: BigTwin; Ultra; SuperBlade; Rack servers; GPU servers; 5G/Telco
- Revenue: ▲US$39.06 billion (2026)
- Operating income: ▲US$2.770 billion (2026)
- Net income: ▲US$2.23 billion (2026)
- Total assets: ▲US$29.95 billion (2026)
- Total equity: ▲US$14.479 billion (2026)
- Number of employees: ~7,000 (2026)
- Website: supermicro.com
- Footnotes; Financials as of June 30, 2026.

Super Micro Computer, Inc., doing business as Supermicro, is an American information technology company based in San Jose, California. The company is one of the largest producers of high-performance and high-efficiency servers, while also providing server management software, and storage systems for various markets, including enterprise data centers, cloud computing, artificial intelligence, 5G, and edge computing. Supermicro was founded in 1993, and has manufacturing operations in Silicon Valley, the Netherlands, and in Taiwan at its Science and Technology Park.

== History ==
=== 1993-2009: Founding, Ablecom, and the Hyperion project ===
In 1993, Supermicro began as a five-person business operation run by Charles Liang, a Taiwanese-American, alongside his wife and company treasurer, Chiu-Chu Liu, known as Sara. Prior to founding Supermicro, Liang earned a B.S. in electrical engineering from the National Taiwan University of Science and Technology and an M.S. in electrical engineering from the University of Texas at Arlington. Liang holds several patents for server technology and was previously the president and chief design engineer of Micro Center Computer, a motherboard design and manufacturing company, from July 1991 to August 1993. Liang stated that the company was able to turn a profit after six months of operation.

In 1995, Supermicro released a dual-CPU motherboard for servers, becoming one of the first companies to do so. The motherboard was followed up by a four-CPU server board. In 1996, the company opened a manufacturing subsidiary, Ablecom, in Taiwan, which is run by Charles's brothers, Steve Liang and Bill Liang. Charles Liang and his wife own close to 31 percent of Ablecom, while Steve Liang and other members of the family own close to 50 percent. In 1998, Supermicro opened a subsidiary in the Netherlands.

In 2004, Supermicro began to develop energy-saving servers, which was partially influenced by Liang watching the movie The Day After Tomorrow with his family. In 2004, Supermicro became aware of a federal investigation into its sales of computer systems to Iran and set up an export-control program that same year. In 2006 the company pleaded guilty to a felony charge of violating the US embargo against Iran and paid a $150,000 fine.

In 2008, Supermicro was among ten computing companies brought on to the Hyperion project by the National Nuclear Security Administration's Lawrence Livermore National Laboratory. The companies helped to develop a testbed for high-performance computing technologies for the purpose of maintaining the U.S. nuclear weapons stockpile while avoiding underground nuclear testing, and improving the industry's ability to make petaFLOP/s (quadrillion floating operations per second) computing and storage more accessible.

=== 2010-2019: Taiwan science park and San Jose headquarters ===
In May 2010, Supermicro further expanded into Europe with the opening of its system integration logistics center in the Netherlands. In 2012, Supermicro debuted its new 2U and 4U/Tower platforms. The same year, it opened its Taiwan Science and Technology Park, totaling $99 million in construction costs. The Taiwanese factory was expanded in 2019 and came online in 2021.

In September 2014, Supermicro moved its corporate headquarters to the former Mercury News headquarters in North San Jose, California, along Interstate 880, naming the campus Supermicro Green Computing Park. In 2017, the company completed a new 182,000 square-foot manufacturing building on the campus, which was designed to meet LEED gold certification.

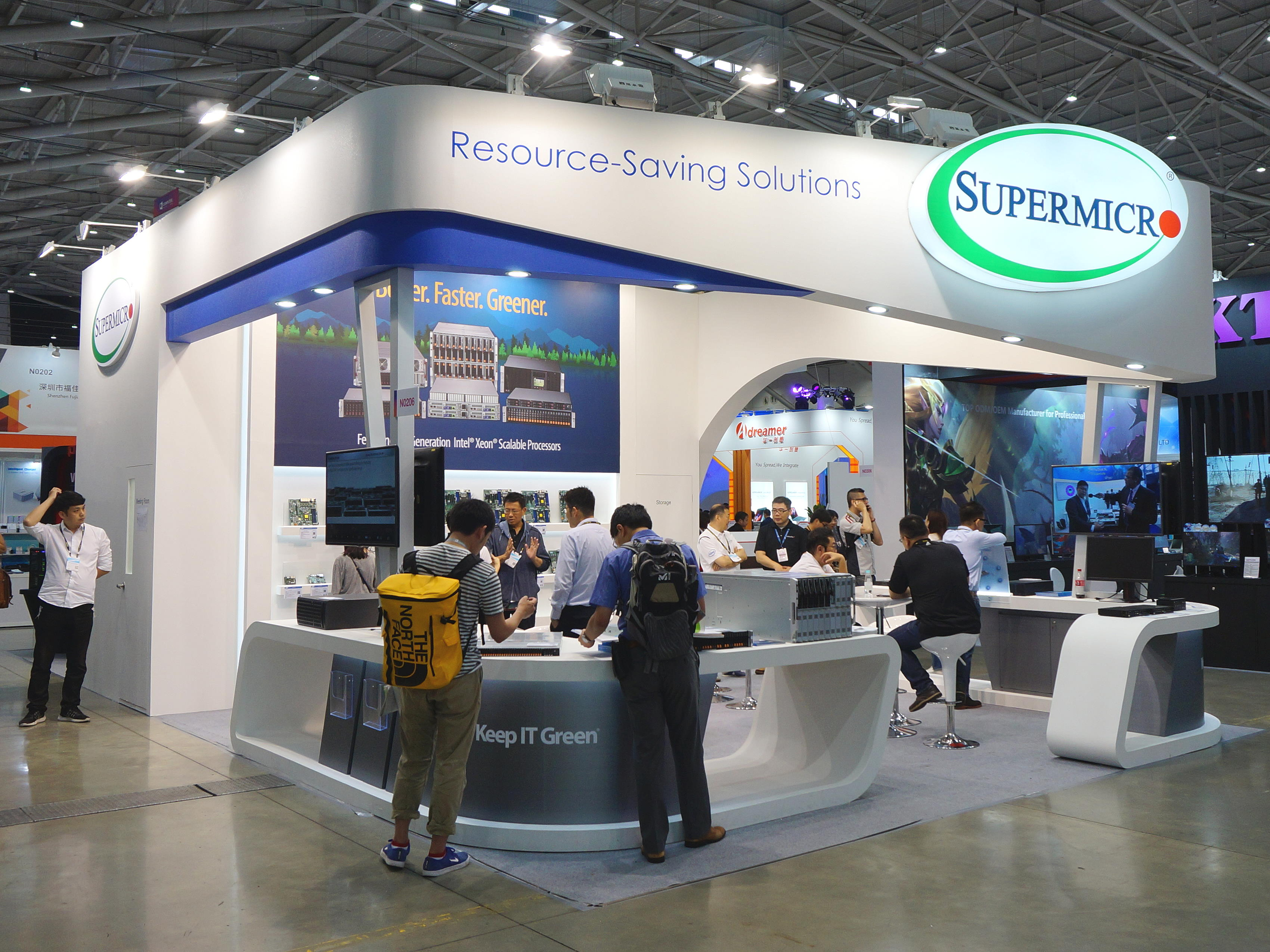
Supermicro booth at COMPUTEX Taipei in 2019

In 2016, Supermicro sent 30,000 MicroBlade servers to a Silicon Valley data center with a claimed power usage effectiveness (PUE) of 1.06. While Supermicro did not name the customer, it was likely Intel, who opened a similar data center in November 2015 with a PUE of 1.06. In 2018, the company was briefly delisted from the Nasdaq after delaying to file financial reports by nearly two years.

In October 2018, Bloomberg Businessweek reported, citing unnamed sources, that China's People's Liberation Army had forced Supermicro's Chinese subcontractors to add microchips with hardware backdoors to servers sold to U.S. government agencies and companies. Supermicro denied the report, as did sources and companies named in the report. A second Bloomberg report in October 2018 alleged a hardware implant in Supermicro servers at a U.S. telecom company. Supermicro reviewed its motherboards and told the Securities and Exchange Commission it was "confident" that "no malicious hardware chip had been implanted." In February 2021, Bloomberg Business reported that U.S. intelligence used the altered servers to gather intelligence about China, warning only a small number of potential targets, despite those servers allegedly having been compromised since 2011.

=== 2020-2023: Expansion, Rakuten partnership, and liquid-cooled servers ===
In April 2020, Supermicro announced the H12 A+ Superblade, a blade server based on the 2nd gen Epyc 1P family of CPUs. It was the first blade server platform to implement AMD's Epyc processors. The same year, it settled with the United States Securities and Exchange Commission over violations in accounting practices between 2014 and 2017, agreeing to pay $17.5 million in penalties.

In April 2021, Supermicro introduced over 100 application-optimized server product SKUs using (new at the time) 3rd Gen Intel Xeon Scalable processors, including Hyper, SuperBlade, the Twin Product Family (BigTwin, TwinPro, and FatTwin), Ultra, CloudDC, GPU, Telco/5Gand Edge servers. The company expanded its San Jose campus in September 2021 with a manufacturing facility for advanced storage and server equipment. Supermicro was reported to have 2,400 people working in San Jose. In November 2021, the joint venture of Super Micro Computer and Fiberhome Telecommunication Technologies won a contract for supplying servers to the Xinjiang Production and Construction Corps for public safety purposes.

In 2023, Supermicro partnered with Rakuten Symphony on high-performing Open RAN technologies and storage systems for operators of cloud-based mobile services. Later in the year, Supermicro debuted servers with liquid cooling, focusing on ESG policies. The servers save approximately 40% of the power expended on air-cooled data centers. In June 2023, Supermicro saw increased demand for its large language model optimized AI systems, featuring NVIDIA chips.

=== 2024-present: xAI Colossus, DataVolt agreement, and US manufacturing expansion ===
In July 2024, it was announced that Supermicro would be providing half the servers for Elon Musk's artificial intelligence start-up, xAI, with Dell providing the other half. The project was completed in 122 days resulting in the creation of a 750,000 square foot Memphis-based data center to host Colossus, a supercomputer. Supermicro also supplied servers for Tesla's Gigafactory Texas.

In August 2024, short seller Hindenburg Research published a report alleging accounting problems, undisclosed dealings with suppliers controlled by the CEO's brothers, and export violations involving Russia. Supermicro delayed its annual report, and the Justice Department and the Securities and Exchange Commission subpoenaed documents related to the allegations. In October 2024, the company's auditor, Ernst & Young, resigned, citing concerns about internal controls and governance. A special board committee later found no evidence of misconduct, and Supermicro hired BDO as its new auditor in November 2024. It filed its annual report in February 2025, disclosing material weaknesses in its financial controls.

In October 2024, Supermicro announced a partnership with Fujitsu, a Japanese IT services company, for developing energy-efficient servers and liquid-cooling systems for high-performance computing, generative artificial intelligence, and data centers. On December 25, 2024, Super Micro Computer announced a joint venture with Taiwanese development company Guo Rui to build an artificial intelligence data center powered solely by renewable energy in Taiwan.

In February 2025, Supermicro began building its third California-based manufacturing campus to increase production of liquid-cooled services for data centers. A few months later, in July 2025, Supermicro expressed its interest in expanding investment regarding manufacturing in Europe to meet artificial intelligence demand in the area. In May 2025, Supermicro announced a $20 billion partnership with DataVolt, a Saudi Arabian data center company. Under the agreement, Supermicro will supply GPU platforms and rack systems for DataVolt's AI campuses in both Saudi Arabia and the United States.

Supermicro announced an artificial intelligence-based partnership with Nokia integrated data center network products in September 2025. In the following month, Supermicro would partner with Hitachi Vantara, each allowing the other company to offer their products through the opposing companies, focusing on artificial intelligence applications and data lakehouses.

In October 2025, Supermicro created a subsidiary focusing on American federal agencies, which would provide cloud-services and data center materials manufactured from its facilities in Silicon Valley, California. In November 2025, Supermicro reported fiscal first-quarter 2026 results under expectations, stating that "design win upgrades" on server projects, where $1.5 billion in expected revenue shifted due to a high-volume customer requesting last minute updates, which extended integration, testing, and validation times for new GPU-based systems. From the last two years until then, Supermicro's revenue had grown from $7 billion to $22 billion. Additionally, the company received $13 billion in orders on systems based on the Nvidia Blackwell Ultra-based GB300 architecture. In the same month, Supermicro displayed new products at the 2025 Supercomputing Conference, including the Nvidia GB300 NVL72 rack, 8U and 6U SuperBlade multi-node systems, 2U FlexTwin, HGX B300 4U rack, GB200 NVL4 1U server, and GB300-based developer workstation. Updates to the modular and blade families such as BigTwin, MicroBlade, and MicroCloud were also shown at the conference.

In January 2026, Supermicro announced it had expanded manufacturing capacity surrounding it's liquid-cooling technology in support of Nvidia's Vera Rubin (including the Vera Rubin NVL72 SuperCluster and the HGX Rubin NVL8) and Rubin AI platforms. In addition to Supermicro's close ties to Nvidia, the company also has relationships with AMD, Broadcom, Intel, Samsung and Micron. Supermicro also works with MinIO on data storage for AI systems, including the use of MinIO's AIStor platform and its support for Apache Iceberg.

In May 2026, BNN Bloomberg reported that Supermicro and Nano Nuclear Energy signed a memorandum of understanding to provide power to AI data centers through the creation of on-site nuclear power. In June 2026, Supermicro demonstrated its VR200 NVL72 rack using Vera CPUs and Rubin GPUs, which featured liquid-cooling. The same month, it released a series of ARM-based rack-scale AI systems, featuring ARM AGI CPUs. The series consists of the 2U Hyper Server, 5U GPU Server, 2U4N Liquid-Cooled Server, 2U Hyper-E Server, and the 1U 4N in an OCP ORW rack.

From November 2025 to June 2026, Supermicro added eight additional production facilities in the United States, including its Data Center Building Block Solutions campus in San Jose, which was launched at the end of April 2026. As of June 2026, the company planned to open two additional facilities in Taiwan. Supermicro also expanded its Netherlands-based operations. In addition, it operates a Malaysian facility, catering towards Southeast Asia and parts of Europe.

In March 2026, U.S. prosecutors charged three people tied to Supermicro, including co-founder Yih-Shyan "Wally" Liaw, with conspiring to smuggle billions of dollars of servers containing AI chips to China. Supermicro itself was not charged. Liaw resigned from the company's board and pleaded not guilty, contractor Ting-Wei "Willy" Sun pleaded guilty in October 2026, and Taiwan office manager Ruei-Tsang "Steven" Chang remained at large. An internal investigation completed in August 2026 found that neither the company nor its current senior executives were involved, and several employees were fired for violating company policies. In May 2026, Supermicro assisted Taiwanese authorities in an investigation that led to the arrest of three people attempting to divert servers to China.

In August 2026, Cisco announced a partnership with Supermicro to offer Supermicro's liquid-cooled and air-cooled computer systems as part of the company's Secure AI Factory with Nvidia infrastructure. In September 2026, Supermicro released a workstation built around Nvidia's GB300 Grace Blackwell Ultra superchip, intended for "research labs and enterprises running large models locally". The company also announced an expanded partnership with Broadcom, integrating VMware AI Factory software with Supermicro's infrastructure management. In October 2026, Mark Long, previously chief financial officer of Western Digital, replaced David Weigand as CFO.

== Corporate affairs ==
=== Board of directors ===
As of October 2026, Supermicro's board of directors consists of co-founder Charles Liang, co-founder Sara Liu, Tally Liu, Sherman Tuan, Robert Blair, Susie Giordano, Scott Angel, and Shesha Krishnapura. Giordano joined the board in August 2024 and served as the only member of Supermicro's special committee to oversee an internal audit of concerns raised by EY. Krishnapura joined the board following the retirement of former member, Judy Lin.

In April 2025, the company's former senior vice president of corporate development, Yitai Hu, became its chief legal officer, serving as Supermicro's general counsel. In March 2026, DeAnna Luna was promoted to the role of chief compliance officer at the company.

=== Financials ===
On March 8, 2007, Supermicro raised $64 million in an initial public offering, selling 8 million shares at $8 a share. Supermicro's stock trades under the ticker symbol SMCI on the Nasdaq exchange. In 2009, Supermicro sold about $720 million worth of computer servers and related products and employed almost 1,100 people. By the end of 2023, the company had reported a fiscal year 2023 revenue of $7.1 billion and employed over 5,000 workers globally. Supermicro replaced Whirlpool in the S&P 500 after a large rally in the company's stock lifted its market cap from $4.5B at the end of 2022 to $60B in March 2024. In June 2024, Supermicro made its debut on the Fortune 500 list, reaching number 498. By 2025, the company had climbed 206 spots, earning the 292nd position on the list. On July 22, 2024, Supermicro became a Nasdaq-100 company, replacing Walgreens Boots Alliance in the index. Supermicro was removed from the index in December 2024.

In June 2026, Supermicro raised $7 billion "through a series of equity and equity-linked financing transactions" to fund the purchasing of components related to demand for its AI servers. The components used will fulfill orders worth $39 billion. Additionally, in Supermicro's fiscal third quarter of 2026, the company reported net sales of $10.2 billion, and forecasted revenue between $11 billion and $12.5 billion. Supermicro reported a gross margin of 10.1% in that quarter, topping analyst estimates of 6.75%, attributing the margin recovery and sales to its "combined hardware, software, and services offerings", referring to the company's Data Center Building Block Solutions (DCBBS).
