= HTC U =

Android smartphone series from HTC

- Developer: HTC
- Type: Smartphones
- Released: February 2017
- Operating system: Android
- Predecessor: HTC One series

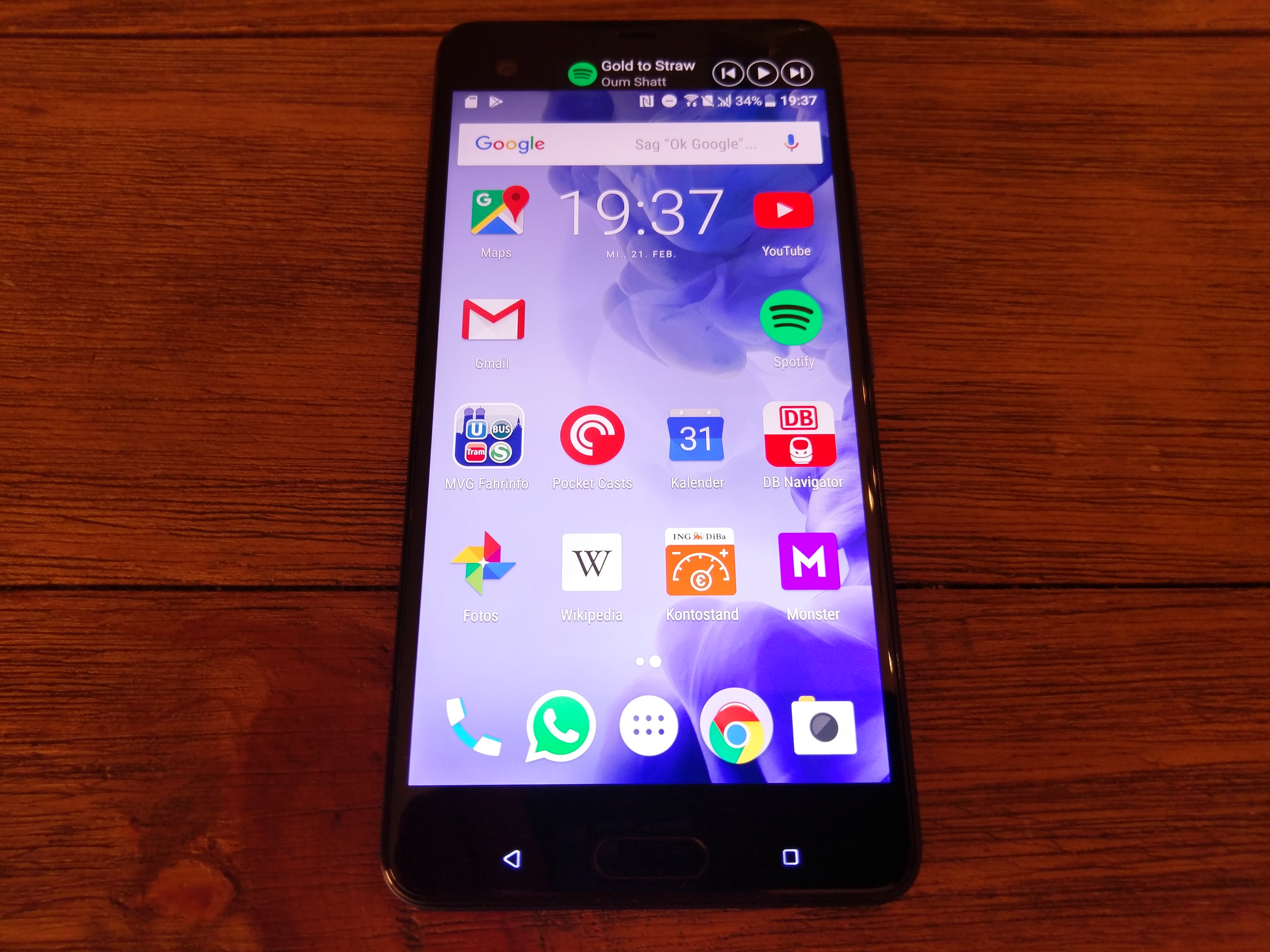
Front of the HTC U Ultra

The HTC U series is a line of upper mid-range and high-end flagship Android-based smartphones developed and produced by HTC. The first phones in the series, the HTC U Play and the HTC U Ultra, were announced in January 2017. The HTC U series is the successor of the HTC One series.

== Phones ==
=== 2017 lineup ===
==== HTC U Play ====
The HTC U Play, an upper mid-range phone, was announced along with the HTC U Ultra on January 12, 2017.

- Display: 5.2" IPS S-LCD with 1080x1920 pixel resolution
- Processor: Mediatek Helio P10
- Storage: 32 or 64 GB (expandable)
- RAM: 3 or 4 GB
- Battery: 2500 mAH

==== HTC U Ultra ====
The HTC U Ultra, a high-end phablet, was announced on January 12, 2017, on the same day as the HTC U Play. Like the LG V10 and LG V20, the HTC U Ultra features a secondary display above the main screen.

- Display: 5.7" IPS LCD with 1440x2560 pixel resolution (main); 2.0" IPS LCD with 160x1040 pixel resolution (secondary)
- Processor: Qualcomm Snapdragon 821
- Storage: 64 or 128 GB (expandable)
- RAM: 4 GB
- Battery: 3000 mAH

==== HTC U11 ====
The HTC U11 flagship smartphone was announced on May 16, 2017, as the successor to HTC's 2016 flagship phone, the HTC 10. It is the world's first smartphone with pressure sensitive frame called Edge Sense where user can control various functions by squeezing the phone's sides.

- Display: 5.5" Super LCD 5 display with 1440 x 2560 pixel resolution
- Processor: Qualcomm Snapdragon 835
- Storage: 64 or 128 GB (expandable)
- RAM: 4 or 6 GB
- Battery: 3000 mAH
- Edge Sense - pressure-sensitive squeeze frame technology

==== HTC U11+ ====
HTC announced the HTC U11+ alongside the HTC U11 Life on November 1, 2017. Unlike the HTC U11 from earlier in the year, the HTC U11+ features an upgraded 18:9 screen ratio, similar to many other 2017 flagship smartphones. According to HTC, the phone has an 82% screen-to-body ratio.

- Display: 6.0" Super LCD 6 display with 1440x2880 pixel resolution
- Processor: Qualcomm Snapdragon 835
- Storage: 64 or 128 GB (expandable)
- RAM: 4 or 6 GB
- Battery: 3930 mAH
- Edge Sense - pressure-sensitive squeeze frame technology

==== HTC U11 Life ====
HTC announced the HTC U11 Life alongside the HTC U11+ on November 1, 2017. There are two versions of the HTC U11 Life: a version running the HTC Sense UI, which was released in the United States, and a version running Android One, which was released in other countries.

- Display: 5.2" Super LCD with 1080x1920 pixel resolution
- Processor: Qualcomm Snapdragon 630
- Storage: 32 or 64 GB (expandable)
- RAM: 3 or 4 GB
- Battery: 2600 mAH
- Edge Sense - pressure-sensitive squeeze frame technology

=== 2018 lineup ===
==== HTC U11 EYEs ====
HTC announced the HTC U11 EYEs smartphone in January 2018.

- Display: 6.0" Super LCD3 display with 1080x2160 pixel resolution
- Processor: Qualcomm Snapdragon 652
- Storage: 64 GB (expandable)
- RAM: 4 GB
- Battery: 3930 mAH

==== HTC U12+ ====
HTC announced the HTC U12+ flagship smartphone in May 2018. The device succeeds the 2017 HTC U11 and HTC U11+.

- Display: 6.0" Super LCD 6 display with 1440x2880 pixel resolution
- Processor: Qualcomm Snapdragon 845
- Storage: 64 or 128 GB (expandable)
- RAM: 6 GB
- Battery: 3500 mAH
- Edge Sense - pressure-sensitive squeeze frame technology

==== HTC U12 Life ====
HTC announced the HTC U12 Life on August 30, 2018. The device succeeds the 2017 HTC U11 Life.

- Display: 6.0" display with 1080x2160 pixel resolution
- Processor: Qualcomm Snapdragon 636
- Battery: 3600 mAH

=== 2019 lineup ===
==== HTC U19e ====
HTC announced the HTC U19e Life on June 11, 2019, an upper mid-range smartphone. The device succeeds the 2018 HTC U12 Life.

- Display: 6.0" OLED display with 1080x2160 pixel resolution
- Processor: Qualcomm Snapdragon 710
- Storage: 128 GB (expandable)
- RAM: 6 GB
- Battery: 3930 mAH

=== 2020 lineup ===
==== HTC U20 5G ====
HTC announced the high-end device HTC U20 5G on June 16, 2020. The device succeeds the 2019 HTC U19e. It is the first 5G smartphone made in Taiwan.

- Display: 6.8" display with 1080x2400 pixel resolution
- Processor: Qualcomm Snapdragon 765G
- Storage: 256 GB (expandable)
- RAM: 8 GB
- Battery: 5000 mAH

=== 2023 lineup ===
==== HTC U23 Pro ====
HTC announced the upper mid-range device HTC U23 Pro on May 18, 2023.

- Display: 6.7" display with 1080x2400 pixel resolution
- Processor: Qualcomm Snapdragon 7 Gen 1
- Storage: 256 GB
- RAM: 8 GB / 12 GB
- Battery: 4600 mAH
- Camera: Quad rear camera unit 108MP primary sensor, 8MP ultra-wide camera, 5MP macro unit, and 2MP depth camera.
- Sound: 3.5mm jack

==== HTC U23 ====
HTC announced the upper mid-range device HTC U23 on July 17, 2023.

- Display: 6.7" display with 1080x2400 pixel resolution
- Processor: Qualcomm Snapdragon 7 Gen 1
- Storage: 128 GB
- RAM: 8 GB
- Battery: 4600 mAH
- Camera: Triple rear camera unit 64MP primary sensor, 8MP ultra-wide camera, and 2MP depth sensor.
- Sound: 3.5mm jack

=== 2024 lineup ===
==== HTC U24 Pro ====
HTC announced the upper mid-range device HTC U24 Pro on June 12, 2024.

- Display: 6.8" display with 1080x2436 pixel resolution
- Processor: Qualcomm Snapdragon 7 Gen 3
- Storage: 256 GB / 512 GB
- RAM: 12 GB
- Battery: 4600 mAH
- Camera: Triple rear camera unit 50MP (wide), 50MP (telephoto), and 8MP (ultrawide).
- Sound: 3.5mm jack

The Trump Mobile T1 Phone, released in May 2026, shares most of its components with the HTC U24 Pro, including fully interchangeable mainboards.

== See also ==
- HTC One series
