= HTC =

Taiwanese electronics company

HTC Corporation
- Type: Public
- Traded as: TWSE: 2498
- Industry: Telecommunications equipment
- Founded: 15 May 1997; 29 years ago
- Founder: Cher Wang; Peter Chou; HT Cho
- Headquarters: Taoyuan, Taoyuan, Taiwan
- Area served: Worldwide
- Key people: Cher Wang (chairperson & CEO); Yves Maitre (former CEO); Peter Chou (former CEO); HT Cho (former CEO); Fred Liu (president of Engineering and Operations)
- Products: Smartphones, VR headsets, Laptop
- Revenue: ▼TWD 23.7 billion (2018)
- Net income: ▲TWD 12 billion (2018)
- Total assets: ▼TWD 67.7 billion (2016)
- Number of employees: 1,946 (2024)
- Subsidiaries: S3 Graphics; Saffron Digital
- Website: www.htc.com

HTC Corporation (Chinese: 宏達國際電子股份有限公司; pinyin: Hóngdá Guójì Diànzǐ Gǔfèn Yǒuxiàn Gōngsī), or High Tech Computer Corporation (abbreviated and trading as HTC), is a Taiwanese consumer electronics corporation headquartered in Taoyuan District, Taoyuan, Taiwan. Founded in 1997, HTC began as an original design manufacturer and original equipment manufacturer that designed and manufactured laptop computers.

After initially making smartphones based mostly on Windows Mobile, HTC became one of 34 cofounding members of the Open Handset Alliance, a group of handset manufacturers and mobile network operators dedicated to the development of the Android operating system. The HTC Dream (marketed by T-Mobile in many countries as the T-Mobile G1) was the first phone on the market to run Android.

Although initially successful as a smartphone vendor as it became the largest smartphone vendor in the U.S. in Q3 2011, competition from Samsung and Apple, among others, diluted its market share, which dropped to just 7.2% by April 2015, and the company has experienced consecutive net losses. In 2016, HTC began to diversify its business beyond smartphones and has partnered with Valve to produce a virtual reality platform known as HTC Vive. After having collaborated with Google on its Google Pixel, HTC sold roughly half of its design and research talent, as well as non-exclusive rights to smartphone-related intellectual property, to Google in 2017 for US$1.1 billion.

== History ==
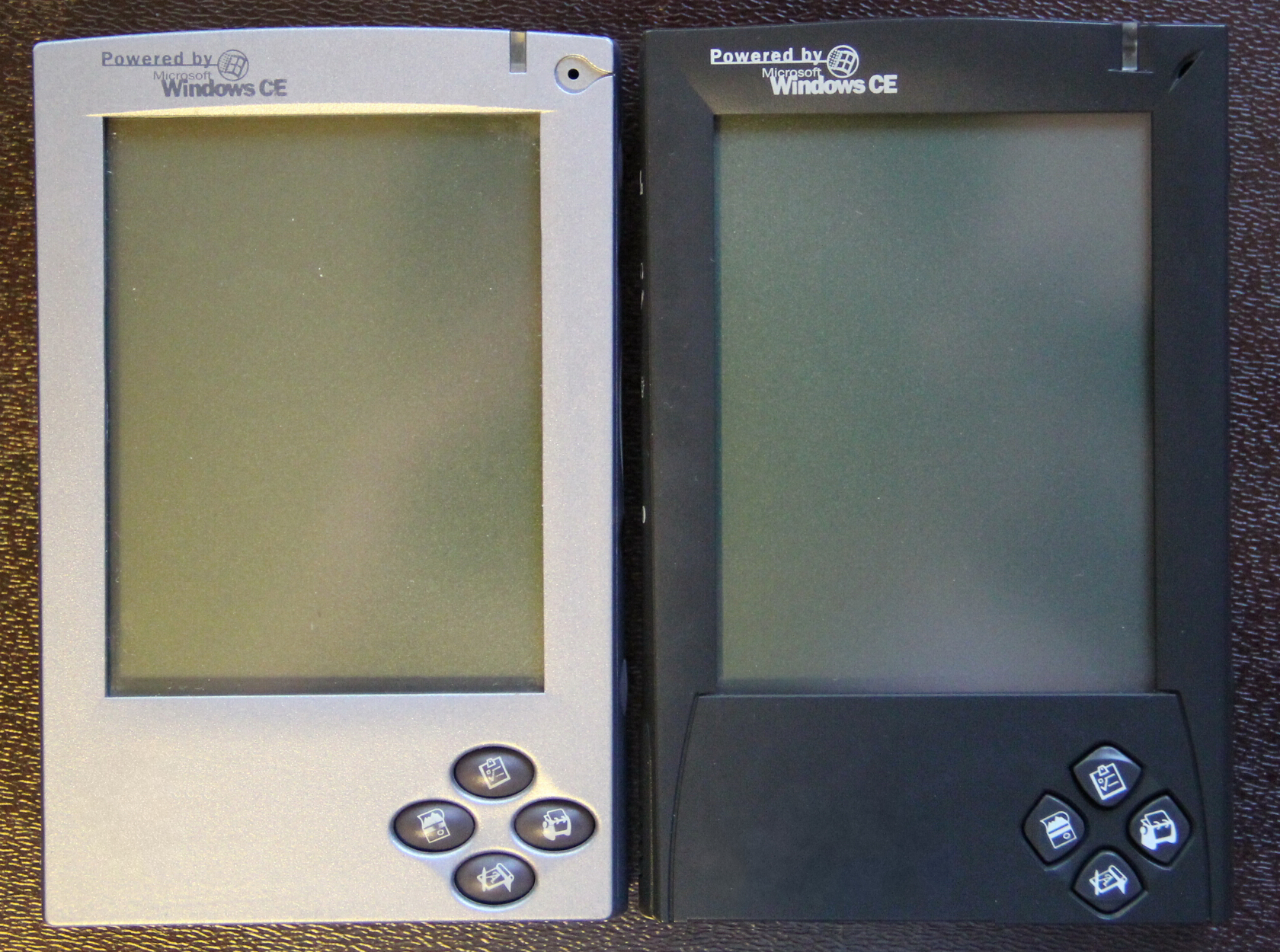
HTC Kangaroo PK10, the first Palm-size PC, released 1998

=== Foundation ===
Cher Wang (王雪紅) and H. T. Cho (卓火土) founded HTC in 1997. Initially a manufacturer of notebook computers, HTC began designing some of the world's first touch and wireless hand-held devices in 1998.

In early 2000s, HTC was one of the OEM manufacturer which produces Windows Mobile PDA devices such as iPAQ and Axim.

HTC started making Windows Mobile PDAs and smartphones starting from 2004 under the Qtek brand. In 2006 the range was rebranded as HTC with the launch of the HTC TyTN.

In 2002, HTC and China Electronics Corporation created the mobile device company Dopod International, and headquartered in Shanghai, which responsible the PDA and smartphone sales in mainland China, Hong Kong and Macau market.

In 2007, HTC acquired the mobile device company Dopod International. In 2010, the Dopod brand was ceased.

In 2008, HTC unveiled the HTC Max 4G, the first GSM mobile phone to support WiMAX networks.

=== Android ===
HTC joined Google's Open Handset Alliance and then developed and released the first device powered by Android in 2008, the HTC Dream.

On 15 October 2009, HTC launched the brand tagline "quietly brilliant"', and the "YOU" campaign, HTC's first global advertising campaign.

In November 2009, HTC released the HTC HD2, the first Windows Mobile device with a Touchscreen. The same year, HTC Sense debuted as a user interface which continues to be used as of 2018.

In July 2010, HTC announced it would begin selling HTC-branded smartphones in China in a partnership with China Mobile. In October 2010, the HTC HD7 was released as one of the launch models of Microsoft's revitalised Windows Phone. In 2010, HTC sold over 24.6 million handsets, up 111% over 2009.

At the Mobile World Congress in February 2011, the GSMA named HTC the "Device Manufacturer of the Year" in its Global Mobile Awards. In April 2011, HTC surpassed Nokia as the third-largest smartphone manufacturer by market share, behind Apple and Samsung.

On 6 July 2011, it was announced that HTC would buy VIA Technologies' stake in S3 Graphics. On 6 August 2011, HTC acquired Dashwire for $18.5M. In August 2011, HTC confirmed a plan for a strategic partnership with Beats Electronics involving acquiring 51 percent of the company.

The 2011 Best Global Brands rankings released by Interbrand, listed HTC at #98 and valued it at $3.6 billion. Based on researcher Canalys, in Q3 2011 HTC Corporation became the largest smartphone vendor in the U.S. with 24 percent market share, ahead of Samsung's 21 percent, Apple's 20 percent and BlackBerry's 9 percent. HTC Corporation made different models for each operator.

During early 2012, HTC lost much of this U.S. market share due to increased competition from Apple and Samsung. According to analyst firm ComScore, HTC only accounted for 9.3% of the United States smartphone market as of February 2013. In light of the company's decrease in prominence, Chief Executive Peter Chou had informed executives that he would step down if the company's newest flagship phone, the 2013 HTC One (M7), had failed to generate impressive sales results. HTC's first quarter results for 2013 showed its year-over-year profit drop by 98.1%, making it the smallest-ever profit for the company—the delay of the launch of the HTC One was cited as one of the factors. In June 2012, HTC moved its headquarters from Taoyuan City (now Taoyuan District) to Xindian District, New Taipei City. On 14 January 2013, HTC launched its smartphones in Burma.

=== Windows Phone ===
HTC is one of the earliest OEMs to produce Windows Phone devices. In June 2012, Microsoft released Windows Phone 8 (which changed the kernel to NT kernel) but without pre-notify OEMs (like Nokia and HTC), this further exhausted the R&D costs of HTC, as HTC must to do many re-adapt work for the new Windows Phone 8 in a short time. In 2012, it was rumored that "Microsoft wants to acquire HTC", but later Steve Ballmer replied that "Microsoft will not acquire HTC" in March 2013.

=== HTC Zoe/Video Highlights ===
HTC Zoe (also known as Video Highlights) is a video editing/slideshow app that allows users to create videos of pictures/videos with a slideshow with different themes. The app was launched in 2012 and shut down in 2020.

=== Litigation ===
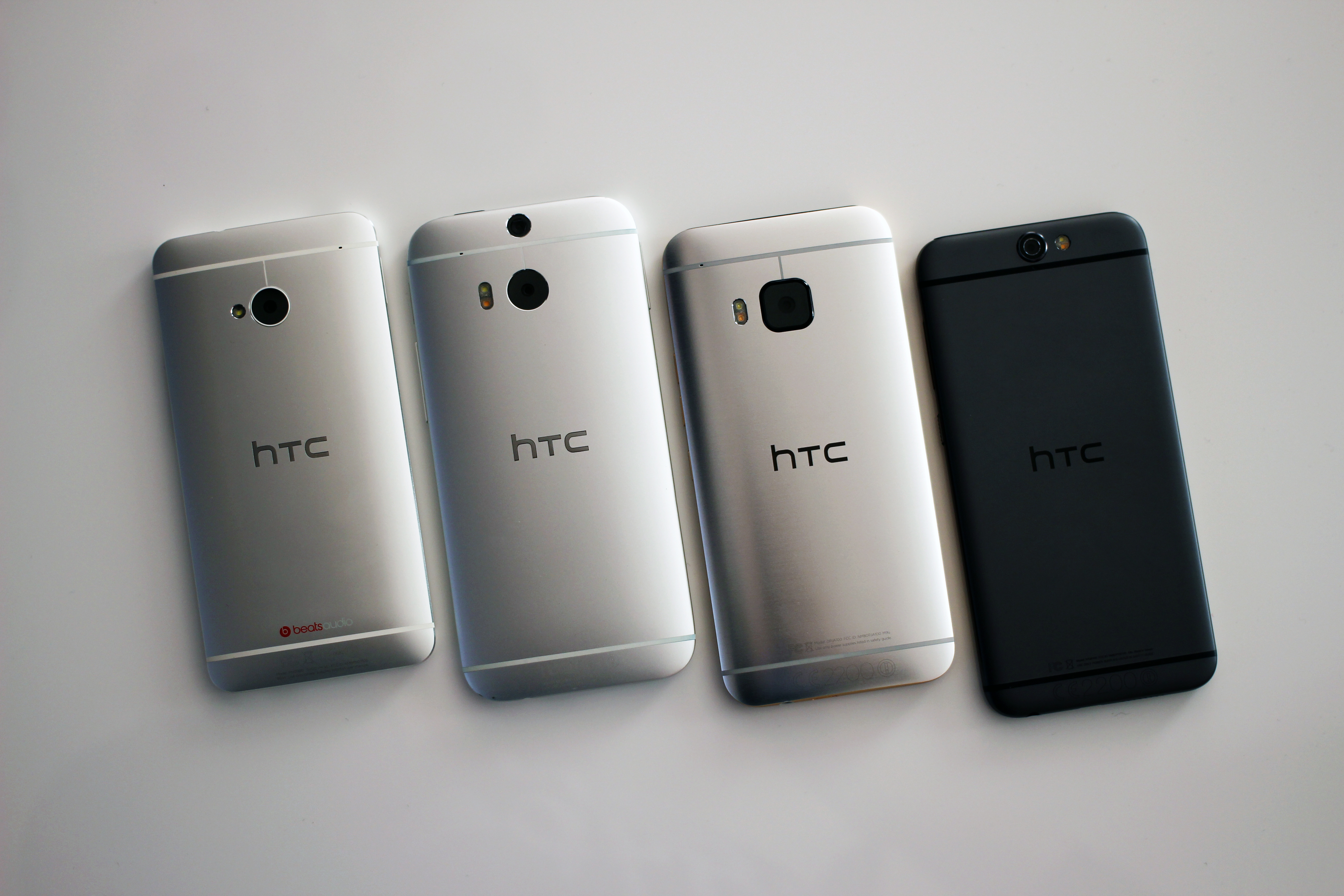
HTC One history

In Q1 2010, Steve Jobs said that "I want to destroy Android". In March 2010, Apple Inc. filed a complaint with the US International Trade Commission claiming infringement of 20 of its patents covering aspects of the iPhone user interface and hardware. HTC disagreed with Apple's actions and reiterated its commitment to creating innovative smartphones. HTC also filed a complaint against Apple for infringing on five of its patents and sought to ban the import of Apple products into the US from manufacturing facilities in Asia. Apple expanded its original complaint by adding two more patents.

On 10 November 2012, Apple and HTC reached a 10-year license-agreement covering current and future patents held by the two companies, shortly after the Google's acquisition of Motorola Mobility. The terms of the agreement remain confidential.

Previously, Apple ignored HTC's long held rights over the trade name Touch by calling its new iPod range the same.

In February 2013, HTC settled with the U.S. Federal Trade Commission concerning poor security on more than 18 million smartphones and tablets it had shipped to customers and agreed to security patches.

In December 2013, following a complaint by HTC, the company's vice president of product design, Thomas Chien, and five other employees were indicted for leaking trade secrets to Chinese businesses and for breach of trust, after an investigation found that Chien had passed the company's unreleased interface design to contacts in China and had been recruiting HTC staff for firms planned with the backing of the Chengdu city government. In April 2019 the Taipei District Court sentenced him to eight years and one month in prison and ordered the confiscation of about NT$6.83 million.

=== Post-settlement ===
The HTC One (M7) was released in mid-2013 and, subsequently won various industry awards in the best smartphone and best design categories, but global sales of the HTC One were lower than those for Samsung's Samsung Galaxy S4 flagship handset and HTC recorded its first ever quarterly loss in early October 2013: a deficit of just under NT$3 billion (about US$100m, £62m). Marketing problems were identified by HTC as the primary reason for its comparative performance, a factor that had been previously cited by the company.

During 2013, Microsoft was in negotiations to purchase HTC. This was revealed in 2018 by Risto Siilasmaa, chairman of Nokia, in an interview with the Helsingin Sanomat. Microsoft would eventually purchase Nokia's mobile phone business that year.

In August 2013, HTC debuted a new "Here's To Change" global marketing campaign featuring actor Robert Downey Jr., who signed a two-year contract to be HTC's new "Instigator of Change.". On 27 September 2013, HTC announced that it would sell back its stake in Beats Electronics

Following the release of the HTC One, two variants were released to form a trio for the 2013 HTC One lineup. A smaller variant named the HTC One Mini was released in August 2013, and a larger variant named the HTC One Max was released in October 2013. Similar in design and features to the HTC One, the upgraded aspects of the One Max include a display measuring 5.9 inches (15 cm), a fingerprint sensor and a removable back cover for expandable memory. The product was released into the European and Asian retail environment in October 2013, followed by a US launch in early November 2013.

In November 2013, the benchmarking company Futuremark delisted the HTC One and HTC One mini from its rankings on suspicion of cheating, saying the devices gave the 3DMark application bursts of performance designed to produce artificially high scores.

In March 2014, HTC released the HTC One (M8), the next version of the HTC One flagship, at press conferences in London and New York City. In a change from previous launches, the HTC One was made available for purchase on the company website and North American mobile carrier websites on the same day a few hours after the launch.

In April 2014, HTC reported sales climbing 12.7 percent to NT$22.1 billion, the company's fastest growth since October 2011. In September 2014, Google selected HTC to make its Nexus 9 tablet. In August 2014 HTC announced a Windows Phone-powered variant of the One (M8), their first using the operating system since 2012. HTC ended its long relationship with Microsoft afterwards due to Nokia's dominance in Windows Phone devices, and started focusing solely on Android.

=== Vive and Pixel ===
On 1 March 2015, HTC unveiled Vive, a virtual reality head-mounted display in collaboration with Valve. In June and October 2015, HTC reported net losses; the company has faced increased competition from other smartphone makers, including Apple, Samsung, and others, which had resulted in a decline in its smartphone sales, as well a major loss of market share. Its smartphone market share had risen back to 7.2 percent in April 2015 due to its strong sales of recent devices, but HTC's stock price had fallen by 90 percent since 2011.

In November 2016, HTC reported that it had sold at least 140,000 Vive units, and that each unit was being sold at a profit. In January 2017, HTC unveiled its new U series smartphone line, the U Play and U Ultra; the company described the U series as a "new direction" for its phones, emphasizing an integrated virtual assistant developed by the company. In February 2017, HTC reported that in the fourth quarter of 2016, its operating losses had decreased by 13% year-over-year, citing "robust sales performance" and sequential revenue increases throughout the year.

On 21 September 2017, Google announced that it would acquire roughly half of the 4,000 employees who worked in HTC's design and research staff, and non-exclusive licences to smartphone-related intellectual property held by HTC, for US$1.1 billion. The employees included the team involved with Google's Google Pixel, which was manufactured by HTC. Google stated that the purchase was part of its efforts to bolster its first-party hardware business. The transaction was completed on 30 January 2018; while HTC will continue to produce its own smartphones, the company has stated that it planned to increase its focus on Internet of Things and virtual reality going forward.

=== After 2017 ===
On 26 March 2018, HTC reported a quarterly net loss of US$337 million in the fourth quarter of 2017, citing "market competition, product mix, pricing, and recognized inventory write-downs". HTC stated that it would use the revenue to further its investments in "emerging technologies". The company had also cited its increasing VR investments, including its upcoming Vive Pro model, and Vive Focus—a standalone "all-in-one" VR headset unveiled in November 2017.

In July 2018, HTC entered into a partnership with games and apps developer and publisher Animoca Brands. This includes product development and joint collaboration in areas such as games, blockchain, artificial intelligence, machine learning, augmented reality and virtual reality. Animoca's games will be pre-installed on HTC devices in the future.

On 5 February 2019, HTC released its first "Cryptophone", focused on providing universal finance through Bitcoin and creating a portal towards realizing a truly decentralized web.

On 11 May 2019, HTC announced that its Cryptophone will be the first smartphone to support a bitcoin full node.

On 17 September 2019, HTC appointed Yves Maitre, former executive vice president of consumer equipment and partnerships of Orange, as CEO where Cher Wang will continue her role as chairwoman.

On 3 September 2020, HTC CEO Yves Maitre stepped down from the position citing personal reasons. Co-founder Cher Wang then stepped in and is now the current CEO of HTC.

== Corporate affairs ==
The key trends for HTC are (as of the financial year ending 31 December):

	Revenue (TWD bn)	Net profit (TWD bn)	Employees
2019	10.0	−9.3	3,500
2020	5.8	−5.9	2,331
2021	5.2	−3.0	2,178
2022	4.4	−3.4	2,173
2023	4.4	−3.3	2,079
2024	3.0	−3.4	

HTC's chairwoman and acting CEO is Cher Wang who is the daughter of the late Wang Yung-ching, founder of the plastics and petrochemicals conglomerate Formosa Plastics Group. Peter Chou serves as head of the HTC Future Development Lab, and HT Cho as Director of the Board and Chairman of HTC Foundation. HTC's CFO is Hui-Ming Cheng. In addition to being chair of HTC, Cher Wang is also acting chair of VIA Technologies. HTC's main divisions, including the IA (Information Appliance) engineering division and the WM (Wireless Mobile) engineering division, are ISO 9001/ISO 14001-qualified facilities.

HTC's sales revenue totalled $2.2 billion for 2005, a 102% increase from the prior year. In 2005 it was listed as the fastest-growing tech company in BusinessWeeks Info Tech 100.

In 2010 HTC worked with Google to build and produce mobile phones running Google's Android mobile OS such as the Google Nexus One.

In April 2010, HTC grew exponentially after it was chosen by Microsoft as a hardware platform development partner for the now defunct Windows Mobile operating system (based on Windows CE).

HTC invested strongly in research and development, which accounts for a quarter of its employees. The company's North American headquarters are located in Bellevue, Washington. HTC runs a software design office in Seattle (near its North American headquarters) where it designs its own interface for its phones. In 2011, HTC also opened a research and development office in Durham, North Carolina, a location the company chose over Seattle and Atlanta, to focus on multiple areas of Wireless technology.

On 17 February 2010, Fast Company ranked HTC as the 31st most innovative company in the world. On 27 May 2011, in response to customer feedback, HTC announced that they will no longer lock the bootloaders on their Android-based phones.

== Sponsorships ==
HTC sponsored the HTC-Highroad professional cycling team from 2009 to 2011.

In 2012, HTC became the official smartphone sponsor of the UEFA Champions League and UEFA Europa League. HTC also became the shirt sponsors for the Indian Super League franchise NorthEast United for the 2014, 2015 and 2016 season.

Ahead of the 2015 season, Indian Premier League franchise Kings XI Punjab signed a sponsorship deal with HTC. According to the agreement, HTC would be the team's official principal sponsor, and the company's logo would occupy the right chest position on the Kings XI Punjab playing jersey.

HTC sponsors professional eSports teams FaZe Clan, Team SoloMid, Cloud9, Team Liquid, and J Team, (formerly known as Taipei Assassins). HTC sponsored a Super Smash Bros. Melee tournament, HTC Throwdown, which was held on 19 September 2015, in San Francisco. At the end of 2015, the company also sponsored the creation of that year's SSBMRank, the annual rankings of the best Melee players in the world.

== Contract manufacturing ==
HTC manufactured various smartphones for other brands including Palm, Fujitsu-Siemens, Hewlett Packard, Google and Sony Ericsson.

== See also ==
- List of companies of Taiwan
- Comparison of HTC devices
- HTC Sense
- HTC Vive
- IHTC
- TouchFLO 3D
