= Xiaomi 13T =

Hign-end premium Android smartphone lineup manfuacted by Xiaomi

Xiaomi 13T Xiaomi 13T Pro Redmi K60 Ultra
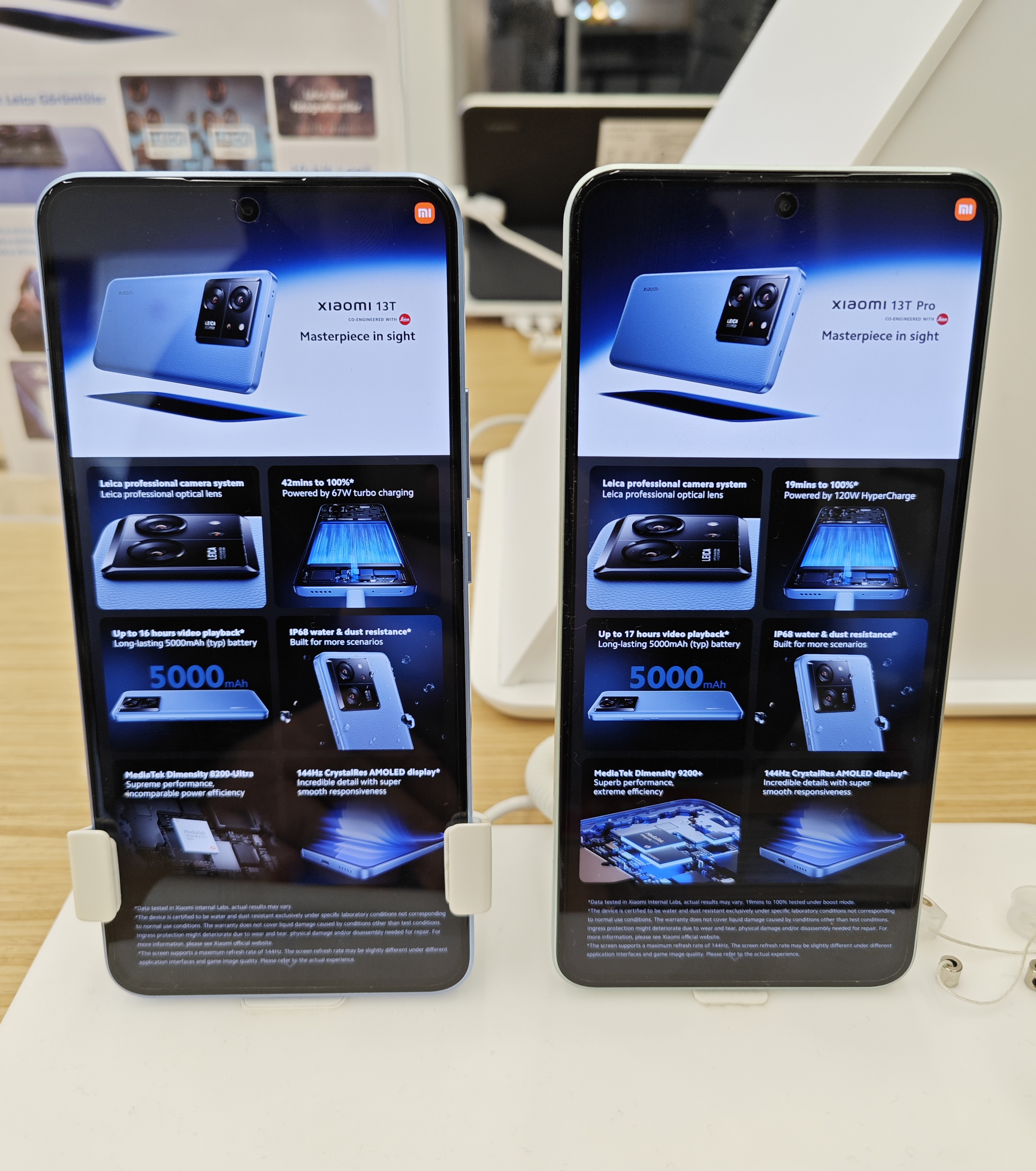
- Xiaomi 13T (left) and Xiaomi 13T Pro (right)
- Also sold as: Redmi K60 Ultra: Redmi K60 Extreme Edition
- Brand: Xiaomi, Redmi
- Manufacturer: Xiaomi
- Type: Phablet
- Series: Xiaomi T, Redmi K
- First released: 13T/Pro: September 26, 2023; 3 years ago Redmi K60 Ultra: August 14, 2023; 3 years ago
- Availability by region: 13T/Pro: September 26, 2023; 3 years ago Redmi K60 Ultra: China August 16, 2023; 3 years ago
- Predecessor: Xiaomi 12T
- Successor: Xiaomi 14T
- Related: Xiaomi 13; Redmi K60
- Compatible networks: GSM, 3G, 4G (LTE), 5G
- Form factor: Slate
- Colors: 13T/Pro: Black; Meadow Green; Alpine Blue; Redmi K60 Ultra: Ink Feather; Green; Clear Snow
- Dimensions: 13T/Pro: H: 162.2 mm W: 75.7 mm D: 8.49 mm (glass); 8.62 mm (silicone-polymer); Redmi K60 Ultra: H: 162.2 mm W: 75.7 mm D: 8.49 mm
- Weight: 13T: 197 g (glass); 193 g (silicone-polymer); 13T Pro: 206 g (glass); 200 g (silicone-polymer); Redmi K60 Ultra: 204 g
- Operating system: Initial: Android 13 + MIUI 14; Current: Android 15 + Xiaomi HyperOS 2
- System-on-chip: 13T: MediaTek Dimensity 8200 Ultra (4 nm); 13T Pro/Redmi K60 Ultra: MediaTek Dimensity 9200+ (4 nm)
- CPU: 13T: (1×3.1 GHz Cortex-A78 & 3×3 GHz Cortex-A78 & 4×2 GHz Cortex-A55); 13T Pro/Redmi K60 Ultra: 8 cores (1×3.35 GHz Cortex-X3 & 3×3 GHz Cortex-A715 & 4×2 GHz Cortex-A510)
- GPU: 13T: Mali-G610 MC6; 13T Pro/Redmi K60 Ultra: Immortalis-G715 MC11
- Memory: 13T: 8/12 GB LPDDR5; 13T Pro: 12/16 GB LPDDR5X; Redmi K60 Ultra: 12/16/24 GB LPDDR5X
- Storage: 13T: 256 GB UFS 3.1; 13T Pro/Redmi K60 Ultra: 256/512 GB, 1 TB UFS 4.0
- SIM: 13T/Pro Nano-SIM + eSIM or Dual SIM (Nano-SIM); Redmi K60 Ultra Dual SIM (Nano-SIM)
- Battery: Non-removable, Li-Po 5000 mAh
- Charging: 13T: 67W fast charging; 13T Pro/Redmi K60 Ultra: 120W fast charging; All models: Power Delivery 3.0, Quick Charge 4
- Rear camera: 13T/Pro: 50 MP, f/1.9, 24mm (wide), 1/1.28", 1.22 µm, PDAF, OIS + 50 MP, f/1.9, 50mm (telephoto), 1/2.88", 0.61 µm, PDAF, 2x optical zoom + 12 MP, f/2.2, 15mm (ultrawide), 1/3.06", 1.12 µm Leica optics (region dependent), color temperature sensor, LED flash, HDR, panorama; Redmi K60 Ultra: 50 MP Sony IMX800, f/1.7 (wide), 1/1.49", 1 µm, PDAF, OIS + 8 MP, 119° (ultrawide), 1/4", 1.12 µm + 2 MP, f/2.4 (macro) Color temperature sensor, LED flash, HDR, panorama; Video: 13T: 4K@30fps (HDR10+), 1080p@30 / 60 / 120fps, 720p@30 / 120 / 240 / 960fps; gyro-EIS; 13T Pro: 8K@24fps, 4K@24 / 30 (HDR10+) / 60fps, 1080p@30 (HDR10+) / 60 / 120 / 240fps, 720p@30 / 120 / 240 / 960fps; gyro-EIS, 10-bit LOG; Redmi K60 Ultra: 8K@24fps, 4K@30 (HDR10+) / 60fps, 1080p@30 (HDR10+) / 60 / 120 / 240fps, 720p@30 / 120 / 240 / 960fps; gyro-EIS, 10-bit LOG
- Front camera: 20 MP, f/2.2 (wide), 1/2", 0.8 µm HDR; Video: 1080p@30 / 120fps, 720p@30fps; HDR10+
- Display: AMOLED, 68B colors, 144 Hz, 6.67", 2712 × 1220, 446 ppi, Dolby Vision, HDR10+, 20:9 aspect ratio
- Sound: Stereo speakers 24-bit/192kHz Hi-Res audio
- Connectivity: USB-C 2.0 (OTG), Bluetooth 5.4 (A2DP, LE); NFC, IR blaster Wi-Fi 802.11 a/b/g/n/ac/6e/7 (dual-band, Wi-Fi Direct); GPS (A-GPS; L1 + L5), GLONASS (L1), BeiDou (B1I + B1c + B2a + B2b), Galileo (E1 + E1a), QZSS (L1 + L5), NavIC (L5)
- Data inputs: Touchscreen, 3 microphones, fingerprint scanner (under-display, optical), proximity sensor, ambient light sensor, accelerometer, gyroscope, compass
- Water resistance: IP68
- Model: 13T: 2306EPN60G, 2306EPN60R, XIG04 (KDDI); 13T Pro: 23078PND5G, 23088PND5R, 301XM (SoftBank); Redmi K60 Ultra: 23078RKD5C
- Codename: 13T: aristotle 13T Pro/Redmi K60 Ultra: corot
- Made in: China

The Xiaomi 13T and Xiaomi 13T Pro are high-end Android-based smartphones developed, manufactured, and marketed by Xiaomi. Positioned as camera phones, they were introduced on September 26, 2023. The primary differences between the models lie in the processor, charging power, configuration options, and memory type.

On August 14, 2023, the Redmi K60 Ultra was announced in China alongside the Xiaomi MIX Fold 3. It mainly differs from the Xiaomi 13T Pro in its available color variations, a simpler rear camera setup, and a higher maximum capacity of RAM.

== Design ==
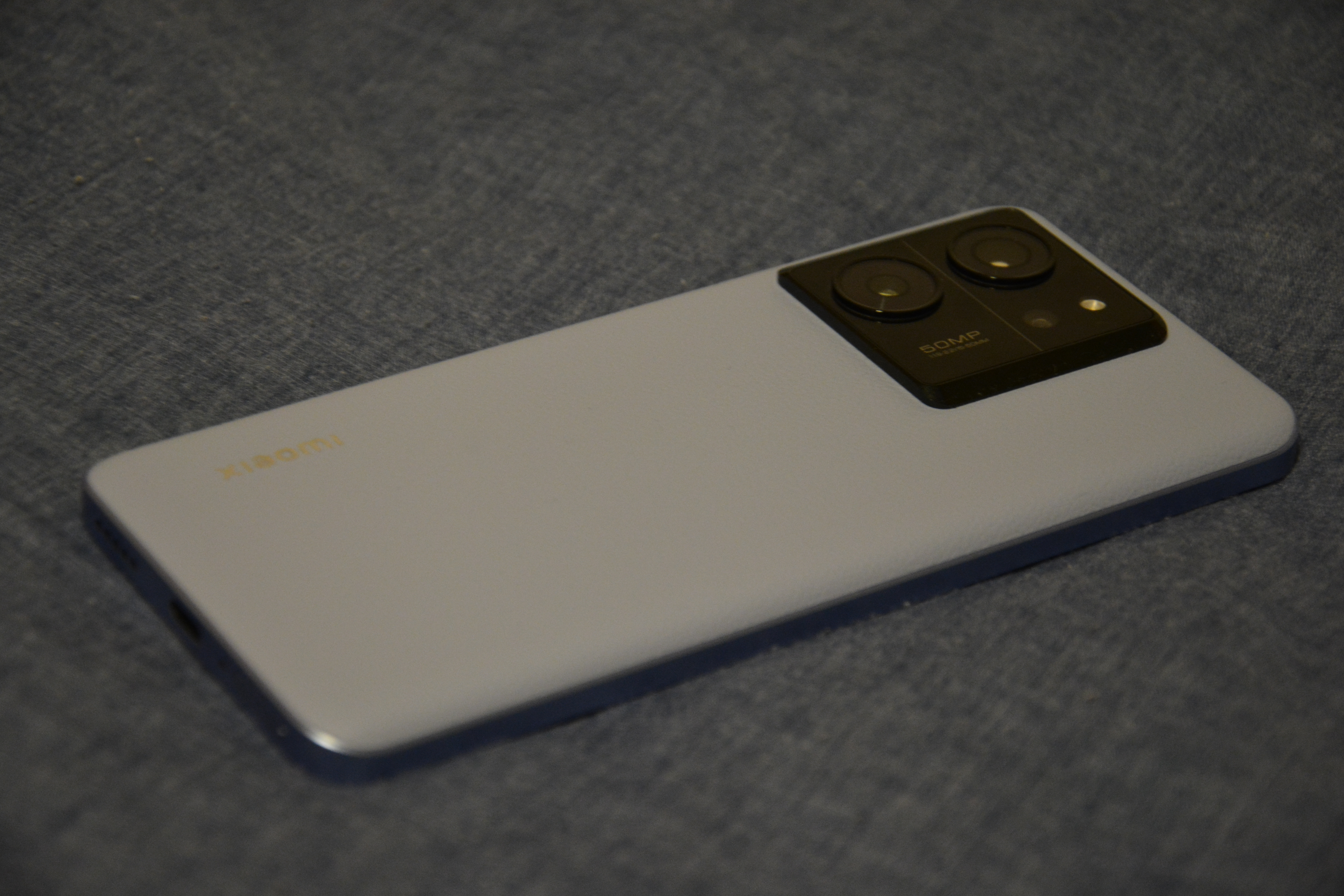
Rear panel of the Xiaomi 13T in Alpine Blue (without Leica branding)

The front panel is made of Corning Gorilla Glass 5. The rear panel is made of either glass or silicone-polymer on the Alpine Blue variant of the Xiaomi 13T and Xiaomi 13T Pro, while the Redmi K60 Ultra features only a glass back. The frame is constructed of plastic. Additionally, the smartphones feature water and dust protection under the IP68 standard.

The bottom houses a dual-SIM card slot, a microphone, a USB-C port, and a speaker. The top features a second speaker, an IR blaster, and two additional microphones, while the volume rocker and power button are located on the right side. On the back, there is a triple camera island whose shape is similar to other smartphones in the Redmi K60 lineup and includes a split design line reminiscent of the Xiaomi 13 series, accompanied by an LED flash, a color temperature sensor, and the branding logo.

The smartphones were available in the following colors:

Xiaomi 13T/Pro		Redmi K60 Ultra	
Color	Name	Color	Name
	Black		Ink Feather
	Meadow Green		Green
	Alpine Blue		Clear Snow

== Specifications ==
=== Hardware ===
==== Platform ====
The Xiaomi 13T features a MediaTek Dimensity 8200 Ultra system on a chip with a Mali-G610 MC6 GPU, while the Xiaomi 13T Pro and Redmi K60 Ultra utilize the Dimensity 9200+ with an Immortalis-G715 MC11 GPU.

==== Battery ====
The device comes with a 5000 mAh battery. The Xiaomi 13T supports fast charging up to 67W, while the Xiaomi 13T Pro and Redmi K60 Ultra support up to 120W.

==== Camera ====
The smartphones are equipped with a triple rear camera setup. On the Xiaomi 13T series, the system consists of a 50 MP wide-angle lens with an f/1.9 aperture, phase-detection autofocus (PDAF), and OIS, a 50 MP telephoto lens with an f/1.9 aperture, 2x optical zoom, and PDAF, and a 12 MP ultrawide lens with an f/2.2 aperture. The Redmi K60 Ultra features a 50 MP Sony IMX800 wide lens with an f/1.7 aperture, PDAF, and OIS, an 8 MP ultrawide lens with a 119° field of view, and a 2 MP macro lens with an f/2.4 aperture. The primary camera of the Xiaomi 13T can record video up to 4K@30fps, while the Xiaomi 13T Pro and Redmi K60 Ultra support up to 8K@24fps.

Additionally, depending on the region, the cameras on the Xiaomi 13T and Xiaomi 13T Pro may feature Leica Vario-Summicron 1:1.9-2.2/15-50 mm ASPH optics.

All three models feature a 20 MP wide-angle front-facing camera with an f/2.2 aperture, capable of recording video at 1080p@30fps.

==== Display ====
All three models are equipped with a 6.67-inch AMOLED display with a resolution of 2712 × 1220, a pixel density of 446 ppi, a 20:9 aspect ratio, and support for a 144 Hz refresh rate, Dolby Vision, and HDR10+. It has a centered punch-hole cutout for the front camera and an integrated optical under-display fingerprint scanner.

==== Audio ====
The smartphones feature stereo speakers located on the top and bottom edges. There is also support for Dolby Atmos.

==== Memory ====
The Xiaomi 13T was available in 8 GB/256 GB and 12 GB/256 GB configurations; the Xiaomi 13T Pro in 12 GB/256 GB, 12 GB/512 GB, and 16 GB/1 TB options; and the Redmi K60 Ultra in 12 GB/256 GB, 16 GB/256 GB, 16 GB/512 GB, 16 GB/1 TB, and 24 GB/1 TB configurations. The Xiaomi 13T utilizes LPDDR5 RAM and UFS 3.1 storage, while the Xiaomi 13T Pro and Redmi K60 Ultra feature LPDDR5X RAM and UFS 4.0 storage.

=== Software ===
The smartphones launched running MIUI 14 based on Android 13, and were later updated to Xiaomi HyperOS 2 based on Android 15. The devices are scheduled to receive 4 major Android updates and 5 years of security patches. It was also upgraded to Android 16 with HyperOS 3 user interface in December 2025.

	Pre-installed OS	OS Upgrades history			
	Pre-installed OS	1st	2nd	3rd	4th
13T	Android 13 (MIUI 14)	Android 14 (HyperOS 1); December 2023	Android 15 (HyperOS 2); November/December 2024	Android 16 (HyperOS 3); December 2025	—N/a
13T Pro	Android 13 (MIUI 14)	Android 14 (HyperOS 1); December 2023	Android 15 (HyperOS 2); November/December 2024	Android 16 (HyperOS 3); December 2025	

Preceded by Xiaomi 12T	Xiaomi 13T/Pro; 2023	Succeeded by Xiaomi 14T
Preceded by Redmi K50 Ultra	Redmi K60 Ultra; 2023	Succeeded by Redmi K70 Ultra
