= Xiaomi 14T =

2024 smartphone by Xiaomi

Xiaomi 14T Xiaomi 14T Pro Redmi K70 Ultra
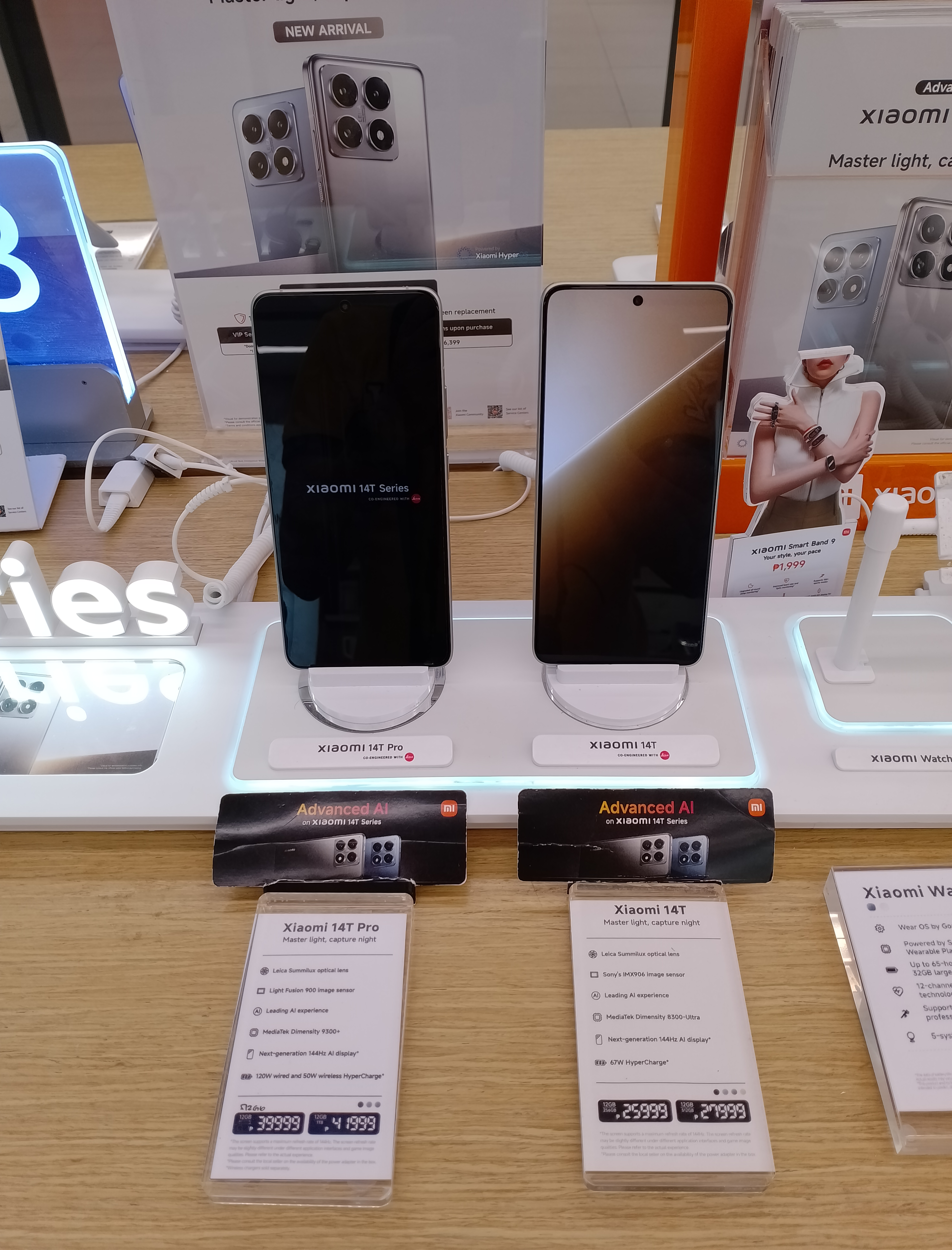
- The Xiaomi 14T Pro (L) and Xiaomi 14T (R)
- Also known as: Redmi K70 Ultra: Redmi K70 Extreme Edition
- Brand: Xiaomi, Redmi
- Manufacturer: Xiaomi
- Type: Phablet
- Series: Xiaomi T, Redmi K
- First released: 14T/Pro: 26 September 2024; 2 years ago Redmi K70 Ultra: 19 July 2024; 2 years ago
- Predecessor: Xiaomi 13T; Xiaomi 13T Pro
- Successor: Xiaomi 15T
- Related: Xiaomi 14; Redmi K70
- Compatible networks: GSM / HSPA / LTE / 5G
- Form factor: Slate
- Colors: 14T: Titan Black; Titan Gray; Titan Blue; Lemon Green; 14T Pro: Titan Black; Titan Gray; Titan Blue; Redmi K70 Ultra: Ink Feather; Clear Snow; Ceramic Glaze; Orange (Champion Edition); Green (Champion Edition)
- Dimensions: 14T: H: 160.38 mm (6.314 in); W: 75.14 mm (2.958 in); D: 7.8 mm (0.31 in) (glass) 7.85 mm (0.309 in) (PU); 14T Pro/Redmi K70 Ultra: H: 160.38 mm (6.314 in); W: 75.14 mm (2.958 in); D: 8.39 mm (0.330 in)
- Weight: 14T: 195 g (6.9 oz) (glass); 193 g (6.8 oz) (PU); 14T Pro: 209 g (7.4 oz); Redmi K70 Ultra: 211 g (7.4 oz); 212 g (7.5 oz) (Champion Edition)
- Operating system: Original: Android 14, Xiaomi HyperOS; Current: Android 16, Xiaomi HyperOS 3
- System-on-chip: 14T: MediaTek Dimensity 8300 Ultra (4 nm); 14T Pro/Redmi K70 Ultra: MediaTek Dimensity 9300+ (4 nm)
- CPU: Octa-core; 14T: 1x3.35 GHz Cortex-A715 & 3x3.2 GHz Cortex-A715 & 4x2.2 GHz Cortex-A510; 14T Pro/Redmi K70 Ultra: 1x3.25 GHz Cortex-X4 & 3x2.85 GHz Cortex-X4 & 4x2.0 GHz Cortex-A720
- GPU: 14T: Mali G615-MC6; 14T Pro/Redmi K70 Ultra: Immortalis-G720 MC12
- Memory: 14T/Pro: 12/16 GB; Redmi K70 Ultra: 12/16/24 GB; LPDDR5X
- Storage: 14T: 256/512 GB; 14T Pro/Redmi K70 Ultra: 256/512 GB, 1 TB; UFS 4.0
- SIM: 14T/Pro: Dual SIM (Nano-SIM + eSIM, eSIM + eSIM, Nano-SIM + Nano-SIM); Redmi K70 Ultra: Dual SIM (Nano-SIM)
- Battery: 5000 mAh; 120W wired, PD3.0, QC4, 100% in 19 min (advertised), 50W wireless, 100% in 45 min (advertised)
- Rear camera: Triple-Camera Setup; 14T: Primary: Sony IMX 906; 50 MP, f/1.7, 23mm (wide), 1/1.56", 1.0 µm, PDAF, OIS; Telephoto: Samsung ISOCELL (S5K)JN1; 50 MP, f/1.9, 50mm, 1/2.76", 0.64 µm, PDAF, 2x optical zoom; Ultrawide: OmniVision PureCel®Plus OV13B; 12 MP, f/2.2, 15mm, 1/3.06", 1.12 µm, FF; 14T Pro: Primary: LightFusion 900 (OmniVision PureCel®Plus‑S OV50H); 50 MP, f/1.62, 23mm (wide), 1/1.31", 1.2 µm, PDAF, OIS; Telephoto: Samsung ISOCELL (S5K)JN1; 50 MP, f/1.98, 60mm, 1/2.76", 0.64 µm, PDAF, 2.6x optical zoom; Ultrawide: OmniVision PureCel®Plus OV13B; 12 MP, f/2.2, 15mm, 1/3.06", 1.12 µm, FF; Redmi K70 Ultra: Primary: Sony IMX 906; 50 MP, f/1.68, 23mm (wide), 1/1.56", 1.0 µm, PDAF, OIS; Ultrawide: Sony IMX 355; 8 MP, f/2.2, 15mm, FoV 119°, 1/4.0", 1.12 µm, FF; Macro: GalaxyCore GC02M1; 2 MP, f/2.4, 24mm, 1/5.0", 1.12 µm, FF; Camera features: 14T/Pro: Leica lens, Ultra HDR, LED flash, HDR, Panorama; Redmi K70 Ultra: Color spectrum sensor, Dual-LED dual-tone flash, HDR, Panorama; Video recording: 14T: 4K@24/30/60fps, 1080p@30/60/120/240/960fps, gyro-EIS, 10-bit Rec. 2020, HDR10+; 14T Pro/Redmi K70 Ultra: 8K@24/30fps, 4K@24/30/60fps, 1080p@30/60/120/240/960fps, gyro-EIS, 10-bit Rec. 2020, HDR10+ (only for 14T Pro)
- Front camera: 14T/Pro: Samsung ISOCELL (S5K)KD1; 32 MP, f/2.0, 25mm (wide), FoV 80°, 1/3.44", 0.64 µm, FF; Redmi K70 Ultra: OmniVision OV20B; 20 MP, f/2.2, (wide), 1/3.96", 0.7 µm, FF; Camera features: All: HDR; Video recording: 14T/Pro: 4K@30fps, 1080p@30/60fps, 720p@30fps, HDR10+; Redmi K70 Ultra: 1080p@30fps, 720p@30fps
- Display: 6.67 inches (Next-generation 144 Hz AI display), 1220 x 2712 pixels (446 ppi), 20,01:9 ratio
- Connectivity: Wi-Fi 7; Bluetooth 5.4, LHDC; NFC; Infrared port
- Model: 14T: 2406APNFAG, XIG07 (KDDI); 14T Pro: 2407FPN8EG, 2407FPN8ER, A402XM (SoftBank), XIG06 (KDDI); Redmi K70 Ultra: 2407FRK8EC
- Codename: 14T: shennong 14T Pro/Redmi K70 Ultra: shennong
- Other: GPS: L1+L5Galileo: E1+E5a+E5b, GLONASS: G1, BeiDou, NavIC: L5A-GPS supplementary positioning, Electronic compass, Wireless network, Data network, MPE; Circle to Search
- Website: Official website

The Xiaomi 14T and Xiaomi 14T Pro are Android smartphones developed by Xiaomi Inc, a Chinese electronics company. They were announced in September 2024. It succeeds the Xiaomi 13T series and introduces upgrades in display technology, camera system, and performance.

On July 19, 2024, alongside the Xiaomi MIX Fold 4 and Xiaomi MIX Flip, the Redmi K70 Ultra was announced for the Chinese market. The smartphone features a different design, larger maximum memory capacity, simpler camera setup and lacks wireless charging support compared to the Xiaomi 14T Pro.

== Design ==
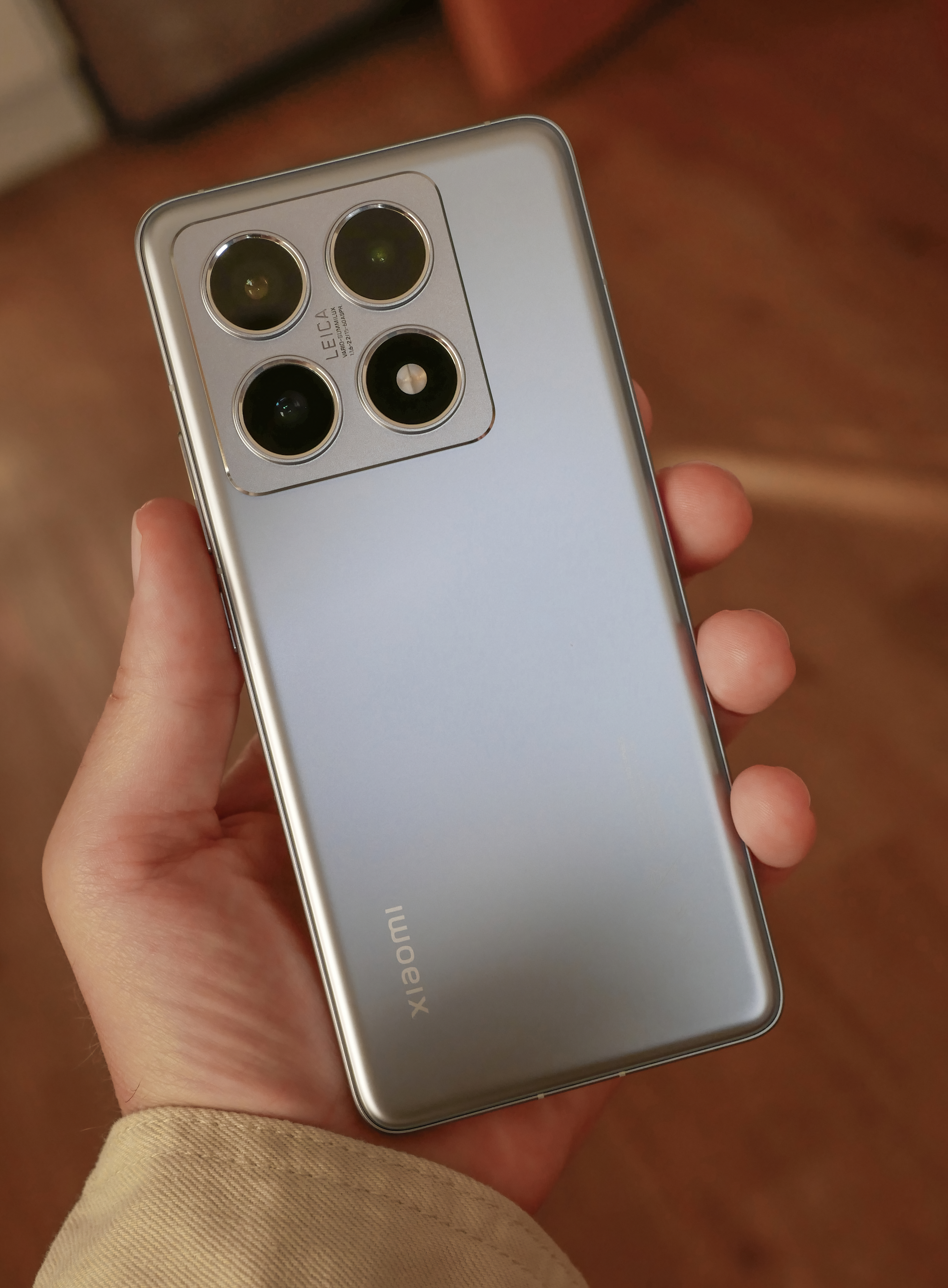
The back of the Xiaomi 14T Pro in Titan Blue

The front is made of Corning Gorilla Glass 5. The back is made of Panda X glass or polyurethane in Lemon Green color for the Xiaomi 14T. The frame of the Xiaomi 14T is made of plastic, while the frame of the Xiaomi 14T Pro and Redmi K70 Ultra is made of aluminum. Also, the smartphones feature an IP68 dust and water resistance rate.

The design of the camera island in the Xiaomi 14T series is similar in shape to the Xiaomi 14 camera island, but its color matches the color of the back panel, and the lenses themselves protrude above the island, similar to the Redmi K70. On the other hand, the Redmi K70 Ultra looks similar to the Redmi K70 series, but with square lenses.

On the bottom there, is a Dual SIM tray, a microphone, a USB-C port and a speaker. On the top, there is an Infrared blaster and two additional microphones. On the right there is the volume rocker and the power button with ribbed surface.

The smartphones were sold in the following colors:

Xiaomi 14T		Xiaomi 14T Pro		Redmi K70 Ultra	
Color	Name	Color	Name	Color	Name
	Titan Black		Titan Black		Ink Feather
	Titan Gray		Titan Gray		Clear Snow
	Titan Blue		Titan Blue		Ceramic Glaze
	Lemon Green				

== Specifications ==
=== Hardware ===
The Xiaomi 14T is equipped with a sub-flagship MediaTek Dimensity 8300 Ultra SoC, while the Xiaomi 14T Pro and Redmi K70 Ultra are equipped with a flagship Dimensity 9300+ SoC. The smartphones were sold in the following memory configurations:

Configuration		Smartphone model		
ROM	RAM	Xiaomi 14T	Xiaomi 14T Pro	Redmi K70 Ultra
256 GB	12 GB	Yes	Yes	Yes
512 GB	12 GB	Yes	Yes	Yes
512 GB	16 GB	Yes	Yes	Yes
1 TB	16 GB	No	Yes	Yes
1 TB	24 GB	No	No	Yes

All three smartphones feature an LPDDR5X type of RAM and a UFS 4.0 type of ROM.

The smartphones feature a 6.67-inch (Next-generation 144 Hz AI display), 1220 x 2712 pixels (446 ppi), with 20,01:9 ratio.

=== Camera ===
The camera is co-engineered with Leica, using Leica Summilux lens on three different focal lengths. Main camera boasts 13.5 EV, high dynamic range and a native 14-bit colour depth.

Wide camera (main): 50 MP LightFusion 900 (OmniVision OV50H, 1/1.31", 1.2-2.4 μm), f/1.6, 23 mm (@FF), multi-directional PDAF, OIS; 4K@60fps / 8K@30fps Ultrawide: 13 MP OmniVision OV13B (1/3", 1.12 μm), f/2.2, 15 mm (@FF), fixed focus, covering 120°; 4K@30fps / 1080@60fps Telephoto 2.6x: 50 MP Samsung ISOCELL JN1 (S5KJN1, 1/2.76", 0.64-1.28 μm), f/2.0, 60 mm (@FF), PDAF; 4K@60fps Front camera: 32 MP Samsung ISOCELL KD1 (S5KKD1, 1/3.44", 0.64-1.28 μm), f/2.0, 25 mm (@FF), fixed focus; 4K@30fps / 1080@60fps

Pictures can be taken in JPEG or RAW format. The camera application has an option of including watermarks in the picture with a Leica watermark too.

==== Battery ====
Phone has a 5000 mAh battery, 120 W wired, PD3.0, Quick Charge 4, and it is on 100% in 19 min (advertised), 50W wireless, 100% in 45 min (advertised).

=== Software ===
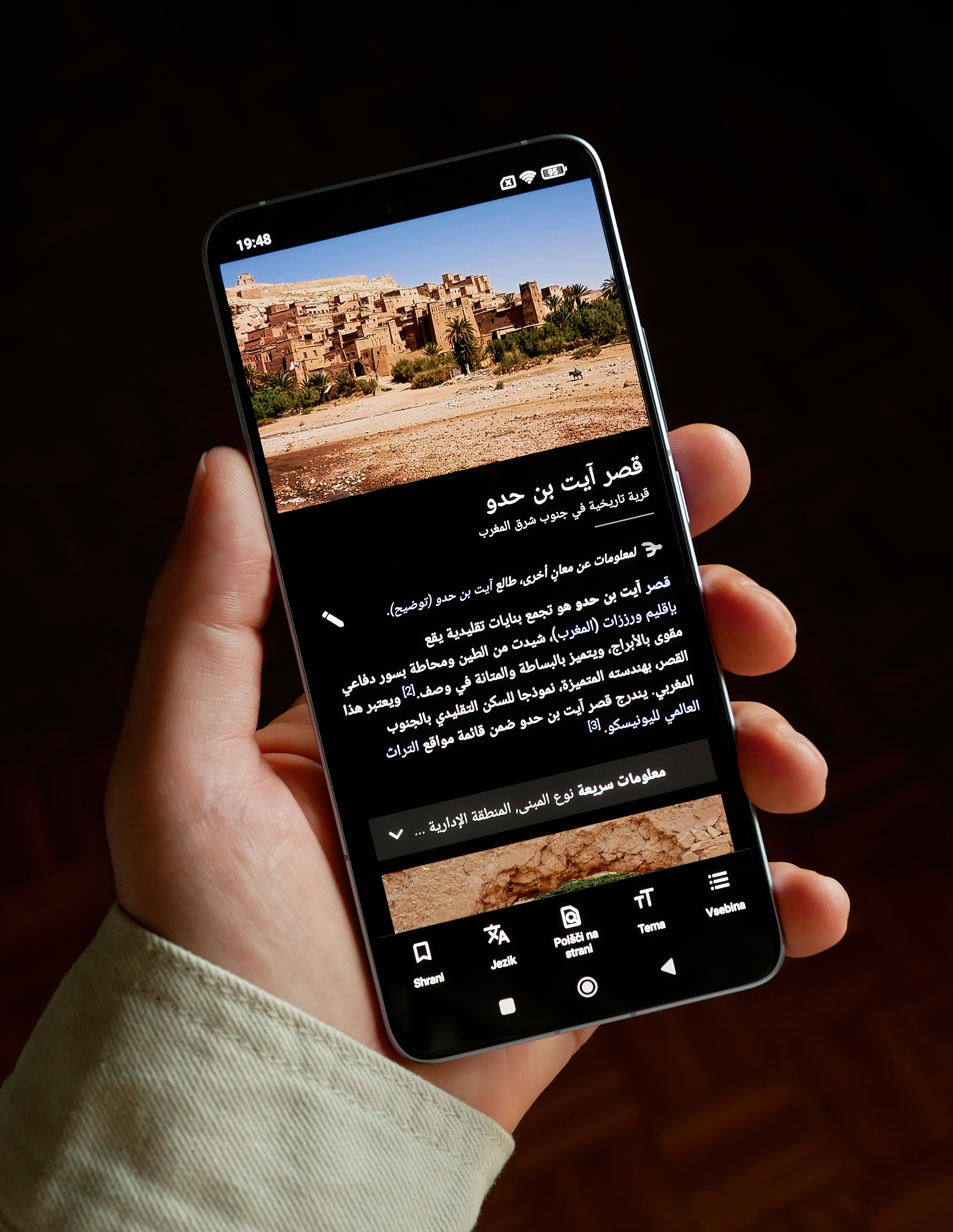
Xiaomi 14T Pro front

The smartphones were released with Xiaomi HyperOS based on Android 14 and later were updated to Xiaomi HyperOS 2 based on Android 15.
