= Xiaomi 11T =

Android smartphones manufactured by Xiaomi

Xiaomi 11T Xiaomi 11T Pro
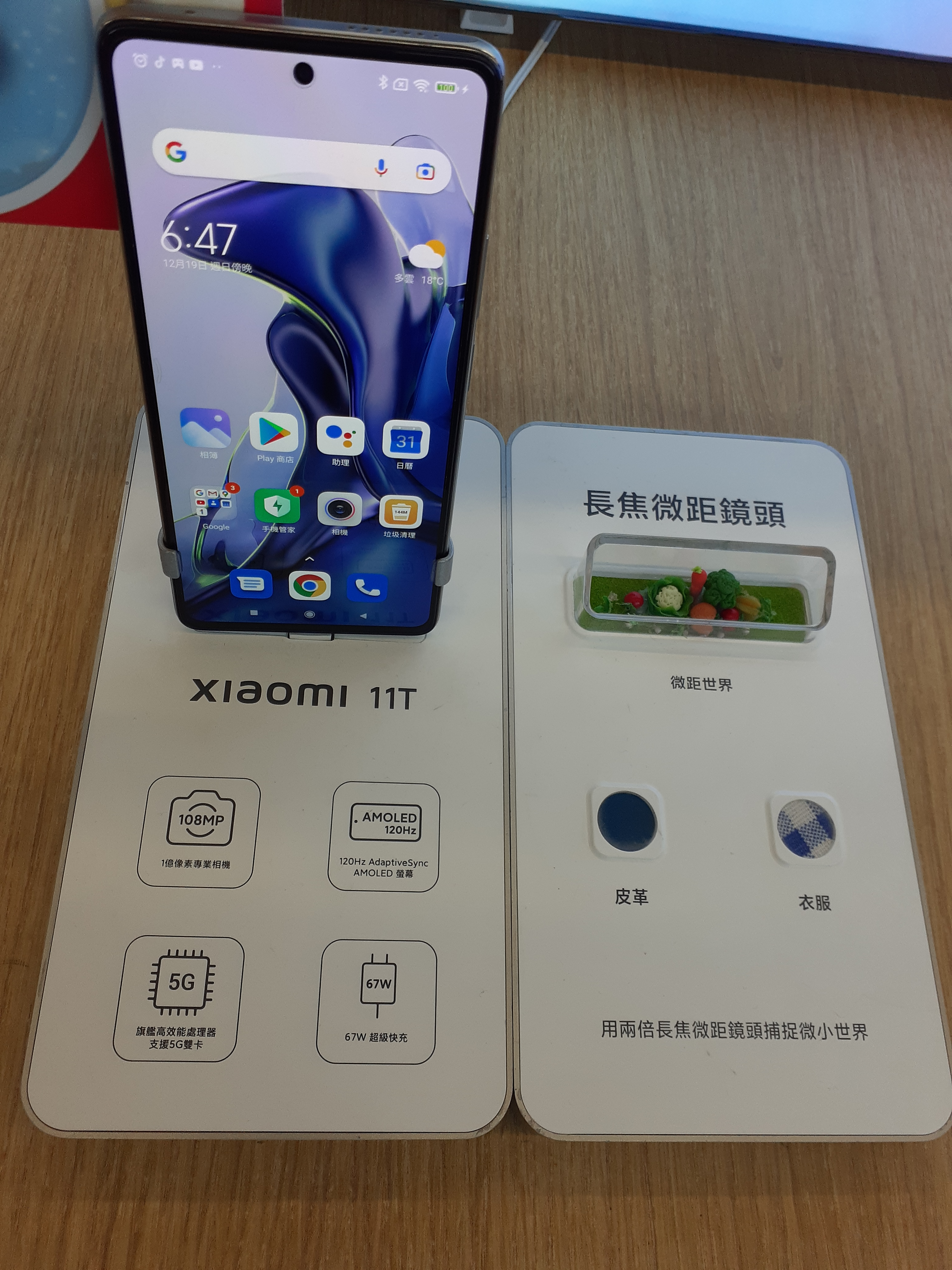
- Xiaomi 11T at Xiaomi Store
- Brand: Xiaomi
- Manufacturer: Xiaomi
- Type: Phablet
- Series: T
- First released: September 15, 2021; 4 years ago
- Predecessor: Xiaomi Mi 10T
- Successor: Xiaomi 12T
- Compatible networks: GSM / CDMA / HSPA / CDMA2000 / LTE / 5G
- Form factor: Slate
- Dimensions: 164.1 mm (6.46 in) H 76.9 mm (3.03 in) W 8.8 mm (0.35 in) D
- Weight: 11T: 203 g (7.2 oz); 11T Pro: 204 g (7.2 oz)
- Operating system: Original: Android 11 with MIUI 12.5; Current: Android 14 with Xiaomi HyperOS
- System-on-chip: 11T: MediaTek Dimensity 1200-Ultra (6 nm); 11T Pro: Qualcomm Snapdragon 888 (5 nm)
- CPU: 11T: Octa-core (1x3.00 GHz Cortex-A78 & 3x2.60 GHz Cortex-A78 & 4x2.00 GHz Cortex-A78); 11T Pro: Octa-core (1x2.84 GHz Kryo-680 & 3x2.42 GHz Kryo 680 & 4x1.80 GHz Kryo 680)
- GPU: 11T: Mali-G77; 11T Pro: Adreno 660
- Memory: 11T: 8 GB RAM; 11T Pro: 8 GB RAM or 12 GB RAM
- Storage: 128 GB, 256 GB
- Removable storage: None
- SIM: Dual SIM (Nano-SIM, dual stand-by)
- Battery: 5000 mAh
- Charging: 11T: 67W Mi Turbo Charging; 11T Pro: 120W Xiaomi HyperCharge
- Rear camera: Triple-Camera Setup; Primary: Samsung ISOCELL (S5K)HM2; 108 MP (7P lens), f/1.75, 26mm, 1/1.52", 0.7 µm, PDAF; Ultrawide: Sony IMX 355; 8 MP (5P lens), f/2.2, 16mm, FoV 120°, 1/4.0", 1.12 µm, FF; Telephoto Macro: Samsung ISOCELL S5K5E9; 5 MP (4P lens), f/2.4, 50mm, 1/5.0", 1.12 µm, AF (3–7 cm); Camera features: All: Dual-LED dual-tone flash, HDR, Panorama; Video recording: 11T: 4K@30fps, 1080p@30/60/120fps, 720p@960fps, gyro-EIS; 11T Pro: 8K@30fps, 4K@30/60fps, 1080p@30/60/120/240/960fps, HDR10+, gyro-EIS
- Front camera: All: OmniVision OV16A1; 16 MP (5P lens), f/2.45, 24mm (wide), 1/3.06", 1.0µm, FF; Video recording: 11T: 1080p@30fps; 11T Pro: 1080p@30/60fps
- Display: All: 6.67 in (169 mm); Corning Gorilla Glass Victus; OLED, 120Hz refresh rate, Dolby Vision, HDR10+, 1200 nits (peak); 11T Pro: Dolby Vision
- Sound: Stereo speakers
- Connectivity: USB Type-C 2.0; Wi-Fi 802.11 a/b/g/n/ac/6, dual-band, Wi-Fi Direct, hotspot Bluetooth 5.2, A2DP, LE; A-GPS. Up to tri-band: GLONASS, BDS, GALILEO, QZSS, NavIC
- Data inputs: Multi-touch screen
- Water resistance: IP53
- Model: 11T: 21081111RG; 11T Pro: 2107113SG, 2107113SI
- Codename: 11T: agate 11T Pro: vili

Xiaomi 11T and Xiaomi 11T Pro are Android-based smartphones manufactured by Xiaomi, introduced on September 15, 2021 and released on October 5, 2021, along with the Xiaomi 11 Lite 5G NE. The main feature of Xiaomi 11T Pro is 120W fast charging.

== Design ==
Front of both smartphones are made of Corning Gorilla Glass Victus. Back made of unknown glass. Frame made of aluminium and covered by plastic.

The design of Xiaomi 11T series is something average between Redmi K40 and Mi 11 Ultra.

On the bottom side, there are USB-C port, speaker, microphone and dual SIM tray. On the top side additional microphone, IR blaster and second speaker. On the right side there are volume rocker and power button with mounted fingerprint scanner.

The 11T and 11T pro phones are available at three color options: Meteorite Gray, Moonlight White, and Celestial Blue.

== Specifications ==
=== Platform ===
The Xiaomi 11T features a MediaTek Dimensity 1200-Ultra processor and a Mali-G77 MC9 GPU, while the Xiaomi 11T Pro is equipped with a Qualcomm Snapdragon 888 and Adreno 660, respectively.

=== Battery ===
Both phones have a 5000 mAh battery. The Xiaomi 11T supports 67 W fast charging, and the 11T Pro supports 120 W fast charging, which the company claims can charge the smartphone to 100% in 17 minutes.

=== Camera ===
Both smartphones feature a 108 MP triple main camera: f/1.75 (wide-angle) + 8 MP, f/2.2 (ultrawide) with a 120° field of view + 5 MP, f/2.4 (telemacro) with phase autofocus. They support video recording up to 4K@30fps on the 11T and 8K@30fps on the 11T Pro. The front camera has a 16 MP resolution, f/2.45 aperture (wide-angle), and supports video recording up to 1080p@30fps on the Xiaomi 11T and up to 1080p@60fps on the Xiaomi 11T Pro.

=== Display ===
The display is an AMOLED, 6.67" FullHD+ (2400 × 1080) with a pixel density of 395 ppi, a 20:9 aspect ratio, a 120 Hz refresh rate, HDR10+ support, and a punch-hole cutout for the camera located at the top center.

=== Audio ===
The smartphones feature stereo speakers located on the top and bottom edges. The Pro version's speakers were co-developed with Harman Kardon.

=== Storage ===
The Xiaomi 11T was sold in 12/128 and 8/256 GB configurations, while the Xiaomi 11T Pro was available in 12/128, 8/256, and 12/256 GB. In Ukraine, the Pro model was only available in 8/128 and 12/256 GB configurations.

=== Software ===
The smartphones were launched with MIUI 12.5 based on Android 11 and were updated to HyperOS 1 based on Android 14.
