= Redmi Pad SE =

Android Tablet

- Brand: Redmi
- Manufacturer: Xiaomi
- Type: Tablet computer
- Series: Redmi Pad
- First released: August 2023
- Related: Redmi Pad; Redmi Pad Pro
- Form factor: Slate
- Colors: Mint Green, Graphite Gray, Lavender Purple
- Dimensions: H: 255.53 mm (10.1 in); W: 167.08 mm (6.6 in); D: 7.36 mm (0.3 in)
- Weight: 478 g (17 oz) (1.1 lb)
- Operating system: Initial: Android 13, MIUI Pad 14; Current: Android 15, Xiaomi HyperOS 2
- System-on-chip: Qualcomm Snapdragon 680
- GPU: Adreno 610
- Memory: 4GB, 6GB, 8GB LPDDR4X RAM
- Storage: 128GB, 256GB eMMC 5.1
- Removable storage: microSDXC up to 1TB
- Battery: Non-removable 8000mAh
- Charging: 18W; Quick Charge 3.0
- Rear camera: 8MP
- Front camera: 5MP
- Display: 11-inch FHD+, 90Hz
- Sound: Quad speakers with Dolby Atmos support
- Website: www.mi.com/global/product/redmi-pad-se

The Redmi Pad SE is an Android-based tablet computer manufactured by Xiaomi, introduced in August 2023. It is part of the Redmi Pad product line, associated with budget devices.

== Specifications ==
The Redmi Pad SE features an 11-inch FHD+ display with a 90Hz refresh rate. It is powered by a Snapdragon 680 processor and comes in configurations with 4GB, 6GB, or 8GB of RAM and 128GB of internal storage, expandable up to 1TB. The device includes an 8000mAh battery supporting 18W fast charging (comes with a 10W charger) and runs on Android 13 with Xiaomi's MIUI Pad 14 interface.

=== Camera ===
The tablet is equipped with an 8MP rear camera and a 5MP front-facing camera.

=== Audio ===
The device includes quad speakers with Dolby Atmos support.

=== Design ===
The Redmi Pad SE features a metal unibody design.

== Availability ==
The Redmi Pad SE is available in China, India, Philippines, and various European countries including the United Kingdom. It is priced around €199-€229 in Europe and ₱8,999-₱9,999 in the Philippines and ₹12,999 in India. It starts at just CN¥999 (~$135) for 6GB + 128GB compared to a €229 price tag in Europe for the same variant. It is not available in the United States.

== Reception ==
Feedback suggests that the Redmi Pad SE is suitable for casual use, including media consumption and light productivity, but may not be ideal for heavy gaming or intensive productivity tasks due to its processor capabilities.
