= Xiaomi 12T =

2022 Android flagship smartphones

Xiaomi 12T Xiaomi 12T Pro Redmi K50 Ultra
- Brand: Xiaomi, Redmi
- Manufacturer: Xiaomi
- Type: Phablet
- Series: Xiaomi T Redmi K
- First released: Redmi K50 Ultra: 11 August 2022; 4 years ago 12T/Pro: 4 October 2022; 4 years ago
- Availability by region: China: K50 Ultra
- Predecessor: Xiaomi 11T; Redmi K40 Pro+
- Successor: Xiaomi 13T; Xiaomi 13T Pro
- Related: Xiaomi 12; Redmi K50
- Compatible networks: GSM, 3G, 4G (LTE), 5G
- Form factor: Slate
- Colors: 12T/Pro: Black, Silver, Blue; Redmi K50 Ultra: Elegant Black, Ice Blue, and Silver Traces
- Dimensions: 163.1×75.9×8.6 mm (6.42×2.99×0.34 in)
- Weight: 12T/Redmi K50 Ultra: 202 g 12T Pro: 205 g
- Operating system: Original: Android 12 + MIUI 13; Current: Android 15 + Xiaomi HyperOS 3
- System-on-chip: 12T: MediaTek MT6893 Dimensity 8100-Ultra (5 nm); 12T Pro/Redmi K50 Ultra: Qualcomm SM8475 Snapdragon 8+ Gen 1 (4 nm)
- CPU: 8 cores (4×2.85 GHz Cortex-A78 & 4×2 GHz Cortex-A55); 12T Pro/Redmi K50 Ultra: 8 cores (1×3.19 GHz Cortex-X2 & 3×2.75 GHz Cortex-A710 & 4×2 GHz Cortex-A510)
- GPU: 12T: Mali-G610 MC6; 12T Pro/Redmi K50 Ultra: Adreno 730
- Memory: 12T: 8 GB; 12T Pro/Redmi K50 Ultra: 8/12 GB; LPDDR5
- Storage: 12T/Pro: 128/256 GB; 12T Pro: 128/256/512 GB; UFS 3.1
- SIM: 12T/Redmi K50 Ultra: Dual SIM (Nano-SIM); 12T Pro: Dual SIM (Nano-SIM + eSIM and Nano-SIM + Nano-SIM)
- Battery: Non-removable, Li-Po 5000 mAh
- Charging: 120 W fast charging, 100% in 17 min (advertised); Power Delivery 3.0
- Rear camera: Wide: 12T: 108 MP Samsung S5KHM6, f/1.7, 26 mm (wide-angle), 1/1.52", 0.7 μm, PDAF, OIS; 12T Pro: 200 MP Samsung S5KHP1, f/1.69, 26 mm (wide-angle), 1/1.12", 0.64 μm, PDAF, OIS; Redmi K50 Ultra: 108 MP Samsung S5KHM6, f/1.6, 26 mm (wide-angle), 1/1.52", 0.7 μm, PDAF, OIS; Ultrawide: 8 MP, f/2.2, 120˚, 1/4", 1.12 μm Macro: 2 MP, f/2.4 Dual-LED dual-tone flash, HDR, panorama Video: 8K@30fps (12T Pro), 4K@30/60 (except 12T) fps, 1080p@30/60/120/240/960fps, HDR10+, gyro-EIS
- Front camera: 20 MP, f/2.24 (wide-angle), 1/3.47", 0.8 μm HDR; Video: 1080p@30/60fps, 720p@30/120fps
- Display: AMOLED, 6.67", 1220 × 2712 (1.5K), 20:9, 446 ppi, 120 Hz, HDR10+
- Sound: Stereo speakers
- Connectivity: USB-C 2.0, Bluetooth 5.2 (12T Pro/Redmi K50 Ultra)/5.3 (12T) (A2DP, LE, aptX HD, aptX Adaptive), NFC, IR port, Wi-Fi 802.11 a/b/g/n/ac/6 (dual-band, Wi-Fi Direct, hotspot), GPS (L1 + L5), GLONASS (L1), Galileo (E1 + E5a), BeiDou (B1l + B1c + B2a), QZSS (L1 + L5), NavIC (L5)
- Codename: 12T: plato 12T Pro/Redmi K50 Ultra: diting
- Other: Fingerprint scanner (under display, optical), virtual proximity sensor, accelerometer, gyroscope, compass, color temperature sensor.

Xiaomi 12T and Xiaomi 12T Pro are flagship series of Android smartphones from the Redmi T series developed and manufactured by Xiaomi. Both smartphones were unveiled on October 4, 2022.

A key feature of the Xiaomi 12T Pro is its 200 MP main camera module, making it the second smartphone after the Motorola Edge 30 Ultra to include such a camera. The Xiaomi 12T Pro also became Xiaomi's first smartphone for the global market to support eSIM. Among Ukrainian operators, Kyivstar and Lifecell are supported.

In China, the Redmi K50 Ultra model is sold, which is similar to the Xiaomi 12T Pro but lacks eSIM support entirely and features the same main camera module as the Xiaomi 12T.

== Design ==
The rear panel is made of glass. The screen is made of Corning Gorilla Glass 5. Similar to their predecessors, the side frame is made of plastic.

The rectangular camera design is similar to that of the Xiaomi MIX Fold 2, but unlike it, the camera island is positioned vertically.

At the bottom, there is a USB-C port, a speaker, a microphone, and a dual SIM-card slot on the Xiaomi 12T and Redmi K50 Ultra, and a single (if eSIM is supported) or dual SIM-card slot on the Xiaomi 12T Pro. The top features a second speaker, a second microphone, and an IR blaster. On the right side, there are volume buttons and the power button.

The Xiaomi 12T and 12T Pro are sold in 3 colors: Black, Silver, and Blue.

In China, the Redmi K50 Ultra is sold in three colors: Elegant Black, Ice Blue, and Silver Traces. Also, similar to the Redmi K50G, there is a Redmi K50 Ultra Mercedes-AMG Petronas Formula One Team Edition, dedicated to the Mercedes-AMG Petronas Formula One Team.

== Technical specifications ==
=== Processor ===
The Xiaomi 12T features a MediaTek Dimensity 8100-Ultra processor and a Mali-G610 MC6 GPU.

The Xiaomi 12T Pro and Redmi K50 Ultra are powered by a Qualcomm Snapdragon 8+ Gen 1 processor and an Adreno 730 GPU.

=== Battery ===
The 12T, 12T Pro and K50 Ultra's battery has a capacity of 5000 mAh and supports 120W fast charging.

=== Camera ===
The smartphones feature a triple main camera setup: a wide-angle lens with phase autofocus at 108 MP, f/1.7 for the Xiaomi 12T; 200 MP, f/1.69 for the Xiaomi 12T Pro; and 108 MP, f/1.6 for the Redmi K50 Ultra. They also include an 8 MP, f/2.2 ultrawide-angle lens with a 120° field of view, and a 2 MP, f/2.4 macro lens. The main camera of the Xiaomi 12T can record video at up to 4K@30fps, the Xiaomi 12T Pro at 8K@24fps, and the Redmi K50 Ultra at 4K@60fps. The front camera has a 20 MP resolution, f/2.24 aperture (wide-angle), and is capable of recording video at 1080p@60fps.

=== Display ===
The 12T, 12T Pro and K50 Ultra's display is an AMOLED, 6.67-inch, Full HD+ (2712 × 1220) with a pixel density of 446 PPI, a 20:9 aspect ratio, a 120 Hz refresh rate, HDR10+ support, and a circular cutout for the camera located at the top center.

=== Audio ===
The smartphones are equipped with stereo speakers, located on the top and bottom edges. The speakers in the Xiaomi 12T Pro were co-developed with Harman Kardon.

=== Storage ===
The Xiaomi 12T is available in 8/128 and 8/256 GB configurations.

The Xiaomi 12T Pro is available in 8/128, 8/256, and 12/256 GB configurations.

The Redmi K50 Ultra is available in 8/128, 8/256, 12/256, and 12/512 GB configurations.

=== Software ===
The smartphones were released with MIUI 13 based on Android 12. They have been updated to Xiaomi HyperOS 3 based on Android 15.
