= Xiaomi Mi 11 Ultra =

2021 Smartphones manufactured by Xiaomi

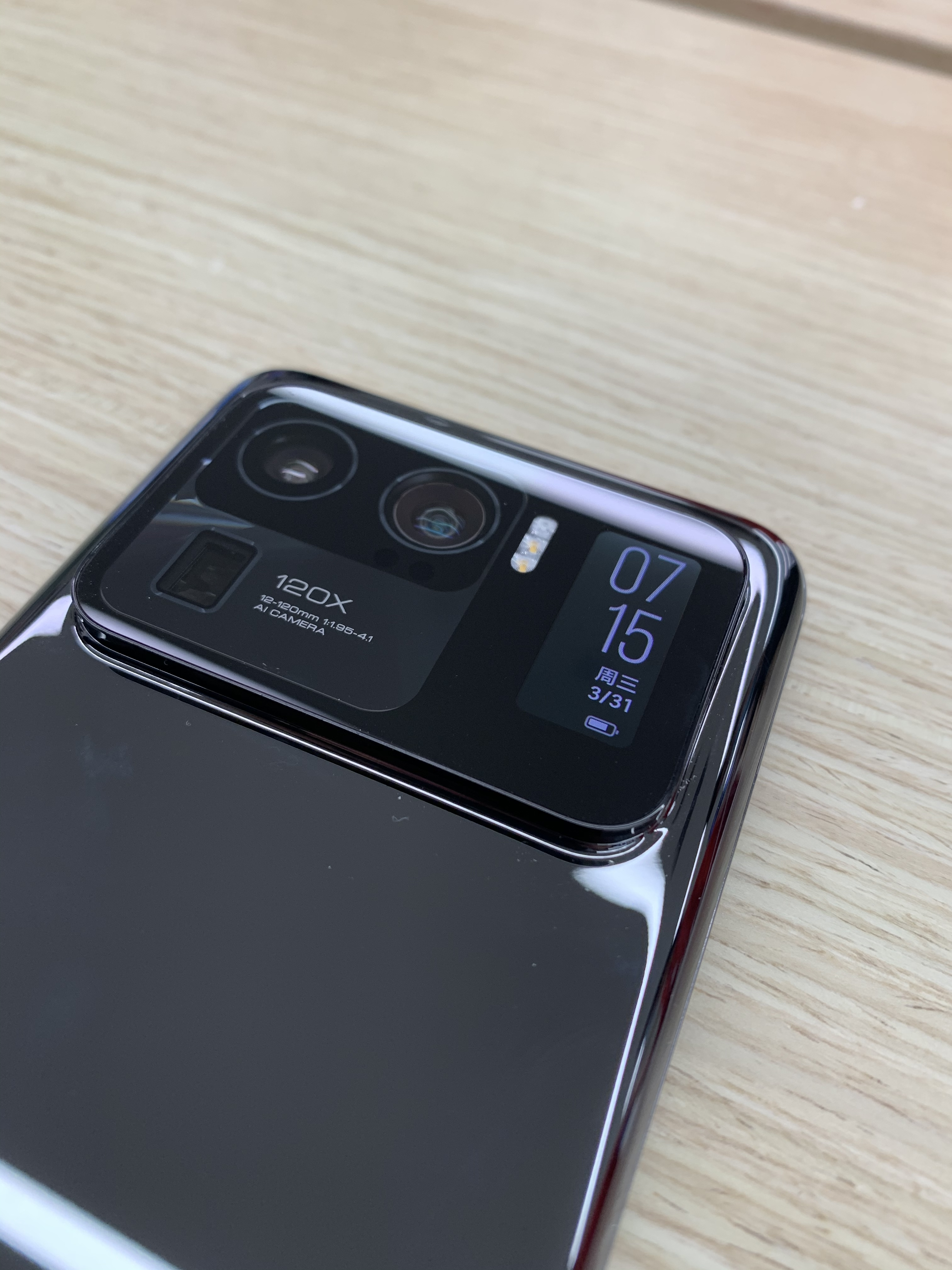
- Mi 11 Ultra secondary display
- Manufacturer: Xiaomi
- Type: Phablet
- Series: Mi
- First released: March 29, 2021; 5 years ago
- Availability by region: April 2, 2021; 5 years ago
- Predecessor: Xiaomi Mi 10 Ultra
- Successor: Xiaomi 12S Ultra
- Related: Xiaomi Mi 11; Xiaomi 11T
- Compatible networks: LTE-FDD; LTE-TDD; WCDMA; GSM; 5G NR
- Form factor: Slate
- Dimensions: 164.3 mm (6.47 in) H 74.6 mm (2.94 in) W 8.4 mm (0.33 in) D
- Operating system: Original: MIUI 12 based on Android 11; Current: Xiaomi HyperOS 2 based on Android 14
- System-on-chip: Qualcomm Snapdragon 888 (SM8350)
- CPU: Qualcomm Kryo 680; 1x 2.84GHz+3×2.42GHz+4x 1.80GHz
- GPU: Qualcomm Adreno 660 (840MHz)
- Memory: 8 GB or 12 GB LPDDR5-6400 RAM
- Storage: 128/256/512GB UFS 3.1
- Removable storage: None
- Battery: 5000 mAh, not removable
- Charging: QC 4+/QC3+/PD3.0 67 W wired fast charging, 67 W wireless fast charging, 10 W wireless reverse charging
- Rear camera: Triple-Camera Setup; Primary: Samsung ISOCELL GN2; 50 MP, f/1.95, 24mm, 1/1.12", 1.4μm, dual pixel PDAF, OIS; Periscope Telephoto: Sony Exmor IMX586; 48 MP, f/4.1, 120mm, 1/2.0", 0.8μm, PDAF, OIS, 5x optical zoom; Ultrawide: Sony Exmor IMX586; 48 MP, f/2.2, 12mm, 128˚, 1/2.0", 0.8μm, PDAF; Features: Laser AF, color spectrum sensor, Dual-LED flash, HDR, panorama, 1.1" AMOLED selfie display; Video: 8K@24fps, 4K@30/60fps, 1080p@30/60/120/240/960/1920fps, gyro-EIS, HDR10+ rec.
- Front camera: Samsung ISOCELL Slim S5K3T2; 20 MP, f/2.2, 27mm (wide), 1/3.4", 0.8μm; Features: HDR, panorama; Video: 1080p@30/60fps, 720p@120fps, gyro-EIS
- Display: 3200×1440 3K (4.6 MP) AMOLED curved screen; 6.81 inches; HDR10+; DCI-P3; 120 Hz refresh rate
- Sound: Stereo speakers tuned by Harman Kardon, lower main microphone, upper noise reduction microphone, back noise reduction microphone
- Connectivity: Wi-Fi 802.11a/b/g/n/ac/6e (2.4 & 5GHz), dual-band, WiFi Direct, hotspot Bluetooth V5.2, A2DP, Low-energy, aptX HD, aptX Adaptive
- Data inputs: Capacitive touch screen, volume button, power button, up and down microphones, distance sensor, ambient light sensor, acceleration sensor, gyroscope, electronic compass, X axis linear motor, holding position sensor, tri-frequency satellite GNSS
- Water resistance: IP67, dust and water protection
- Model: M2102K1G, M2102K1C
- Codename: star
- Other: Face recognition, screen fingerprint recognition
- Website: https://www.mi.com/global/product/mi-11-ultra

Xiaomi Mi 11 Ultra is an Android high-end smartphone developed by Xiaomi, released in April 2021. It serves as the successor to the Xiaomi Mi 10 Ultra. Unlike its China-only predecessor, the Mi 11 Ultra is available for retail in the global market.

The Mi 11 Ultra is heavily marketed around its camera capabilities. At the time of release, the Mi 11 Ultra featured the largest main camera sensor of any conventional smartphone, at 1/1.12 inch. Paired with the main camera are two auxiliary cameras, a 13mm equivalent ultra-wide angle camera and a 120mm equivalent periscope telephoto camera capable of 5x optical zoom. The Mi 11 Ultra features a 1.1-inch secondary display at the back of the phone, next to its camera module.

The Mi 11 Ultra employs a 6.81-inch WQHD+ curved OLED display with a 120 Hz refresh rate, capable of a touch sampling rate of 480 Hz and a peak brightness of 1700 nits. The Mi 11 Ultra is powered by a Snapdragon 888 chipset, the flagship Android processor at the time of release. The Mi 11 Ultra utilises a 5000 mAh battery, capable of 67W wired, 67W wireless, and 10W reverse charging. Upon release, the Mi 11 Ultra had a starting price of £1,199 in the UK, on par with the competition.

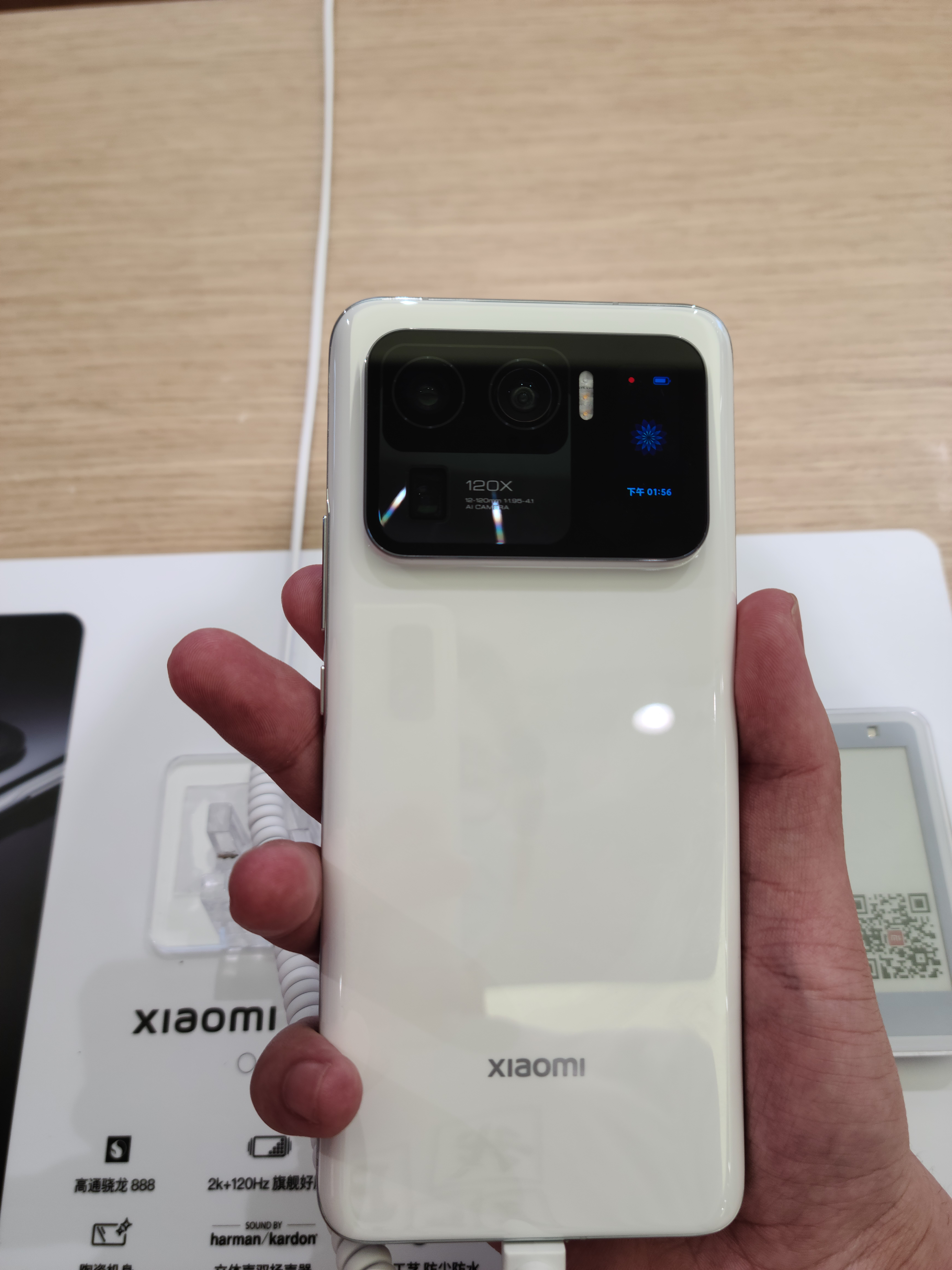
Mi 11 Ultra Ceramic White

== See also ==
- List of longest smartphone telephoto lenses
