= Redmi Pad Pro =

2024 tablet computer by Xiaomi

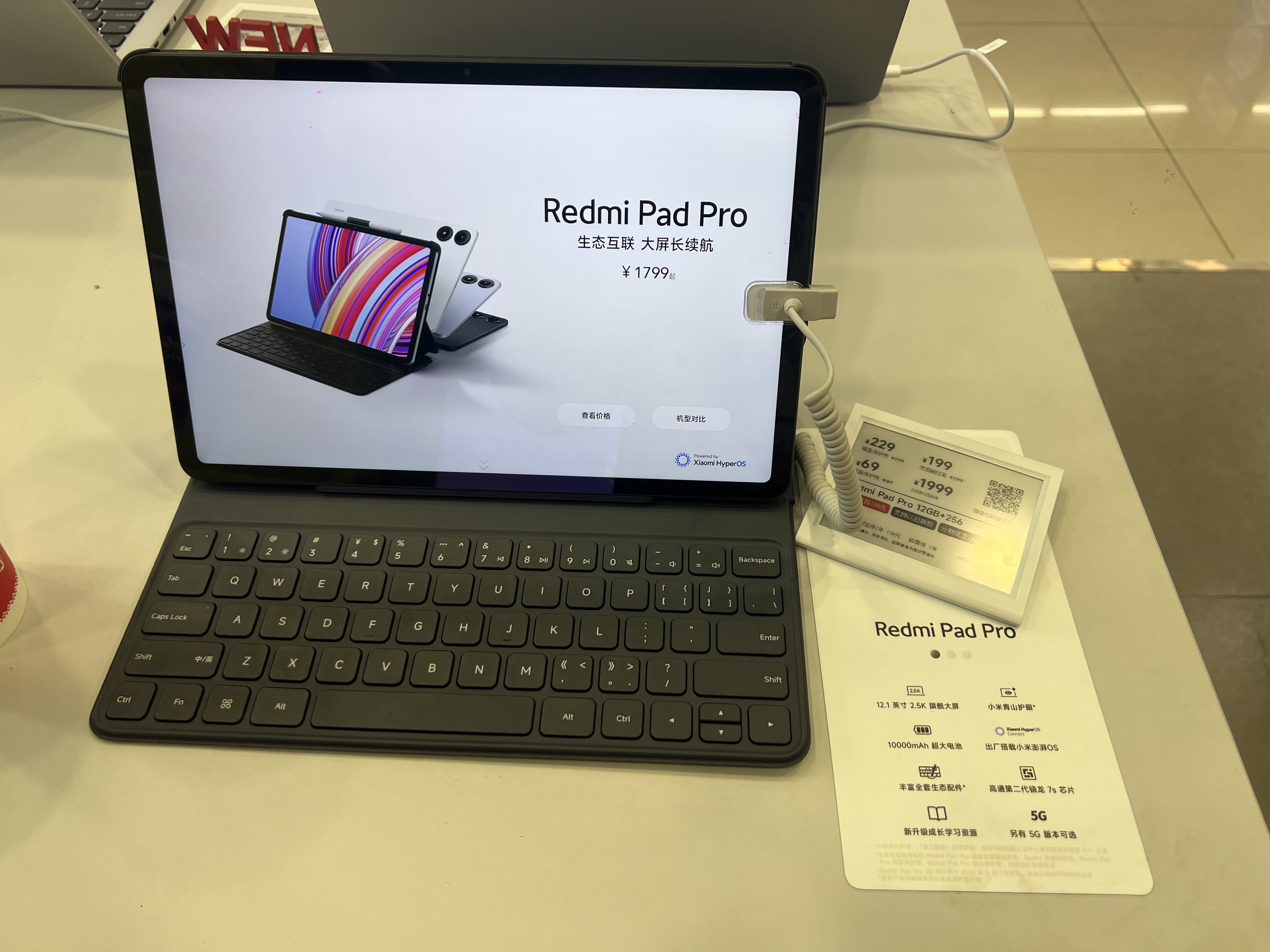
- Developer: Xiaomi
- Manufacturer: Xiaomi
- Product family: Redmi Pad
- Type: Tablet computer
- System on a chip: Qualcomm Snapdragon 7s Gen 2
- CPU: Octa-core (2.4 GHz Quad core, Cortex A78 + 1.95 GHz Quad core, Cortex A55)
- Memory: 6GB, 8GB LPDDR4X RAM
- Storage: 128GB, 256GB UFS 2.2
- Display: 12.1 in, 2560x1600 px (2.5K), 249 ppi, IPS LCD, 120Hz refresh rate
- Graphics: Adreno 710
- Sound: Quad speakers, Dolby Atmos, Hi-Res Audio
- Input: Touchscreen, Redmi Smart Pen (optional)
- Camera: 8MP rear camera, 8MP front camera
- Connectivity: Wi-Fi 6, Bluetooth 5.2, USB-C
- Power: 10,000mAh battery, 33W fast charging
- Dimensions: 280 × 181.85 × 7.52 mm
- Weight: 571 grams
- Related: Redmi Pad; Redmi Pad SE
- Website: www.mi.com/global/product/redmi-pad-pro/

The Redmi Pad Pro is a tablet computer developed by Xiaomi under its Redmi brand. Released in 2024, it features a 12.1-inch 2.5K resolution display, Qualcomm Snapdragon 7s Gen 2 chipset, and up to 256 GB of storage. Aimed at the mid-range market segment, it supports functionalities like a 120Hz refresh rate display and quad speakers with Dolby Atmos for enhanced audio-visual experiences.

== Specifications ==
The Redmi Pad Pro offers a blend of performance and multimedia capabilities. It includes:

- Display: 12.1-inch IPS LCD with a 2560 × 1600 resolution, 120Hz refresh rate.
- Processor: Snapdragon 7s Gen 2, providing adequate power for multitasking and media consumption.
- Memory and Storage: Options of 6 or 8 GB RAM and 128 or 256 GB storage, expandable via microSD.
- Cameras: An 8 MP rear and front camera setup.
- Battery: A 10,000 mAh battery with 33 W fast charging.

== Reception ==
The Redmi Pad Pro has been noted for its robust display and multimedia features, particularly its audio quality, making it a favorable option for entertainment-focused users.
