= Redmi K40 =

Smartphones manufactured by Xiaomi

Redmi K40 (Poco F3; Xiaomi Mi 11X in India) Redmi K40 Pro Redmi K40 Pro+ (Xiaomi Mi 11i; Xiaomi Mi 11X Pro in India) Redmi K40 Gaming (Poco F3 GT in India) Redmi K40S Poco F4
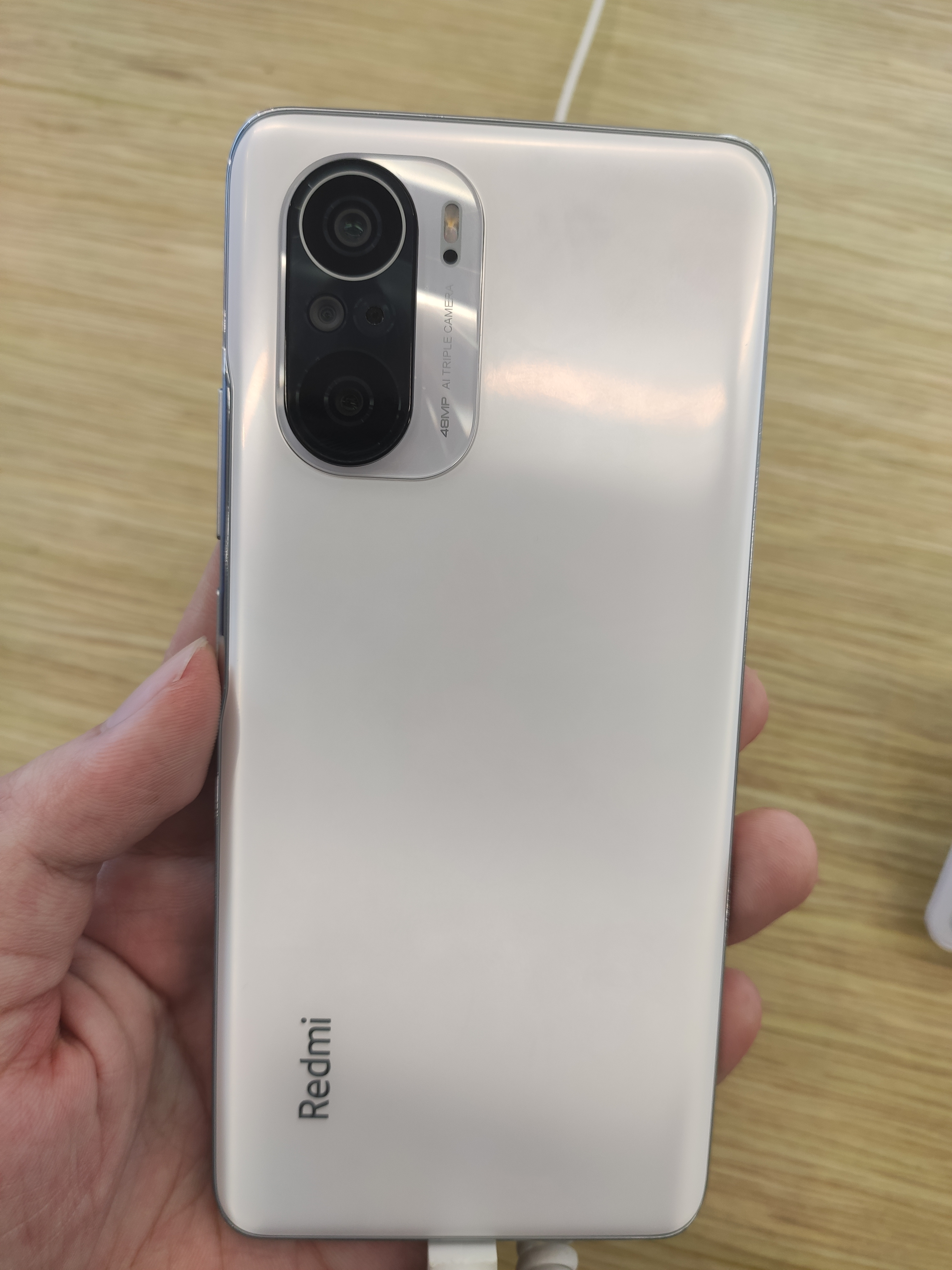
- Redmi K40 in color Sunny Snow
- Brand: Redmi; Poco; Xiaomi
- Manufacturer: Xiaomi
- Type: Phablet
- Series: Redmi K Poco F Mi
- First released: K40/Pro/Pro+: 4 March 2021; 5 years ago Poco F3: 27 March 2021; 5 years ago Mi 11i: April 2021; 5 years ago Mi 11X/Pro: 27 April 2021; 5 years ago K40 Gaming: 30 April 2021; 5 years ago Poco F3 GT: 23 July 2021; 4 years ago K40S: 17 March 2022; 4 years ago Poco F4: 23 June 2022; 4 years ago
- Predecessor: Redmi K30; Redmi K30 Pro; Redmi K30S Ultra
- Successor: Redmi K50; Xiaomi 12X
- Related: Poco F4 GT
- Compatible networks: 2G, 3G, 4G, 4G LTE, 5G
- Form factor: Slate
- Dimensions: K40/Pro/Pro+/Poco F3: 163.7 mm × 76.4 mm × 7.8 mm (6.44 in × 3.01 in × 0.31 in); K40 Gaming: 161.9 mm × 71.9 mm × 8.3 mm (6.37 in × 2.83 in × 0.33 in); K40S/Poco F4: 163.2 mm × 76 mm × 7.7 mm (6.43 in × 2.99 in × 0.30 in)
- Weight: K40/Pro/Pro+/Poco F3: 196 g (6.9 oz)* K40 Gaming: 205 g (7.2 oz)* K40S/Poco F4: 195 g (6.9 oz)
- Operating system: Original: K40/Pro/Pro+: MIUI 12 based on Android 11; Poco F3: MIUI 12 for Poco based on Android 11; K40 Gaming: MIUI 12.5 based on Android 11; Poco F3 GT: MIUI 12.5 for Poco based on Android 11; K40S: MIUI 13 based on Android 12; Poco F4: MIUI 13 for Poco based on Android 12; Current: K40/Gaming/Poco F3/GT: Xiaomi HyperOS based on Android 13; K40 Pro/Pro+/40S/Poco F4: Xiaomi HyperOS based on Android 14
- System-on-chip: K40/40S: Qualcomm SM8250-AC Snapdragon 870; K40 Pro/Pro+: Qualcomm SM8350 Snapdragon 888; K40 Gaming: MediaTek Dimensity 1200 5G
- CPU: Octa-core: K40/40S/Poco F3/F4: (1x 3.2 GHz Kryo 585 Prime – Cortex-A77 derivative + 3x 2.42 GHz Kryo 585 Gold – Cortex-A77 derivative + 4x 1.8 GHz Kryo 585 Silver – Cortex-A55 derivative); K40 Pro/Pro+: (1x 2.84 GHz Kryo 680 Prime – Cortex-X1 derivative + 3x 2.42 GHz Kryo 680 Gold – Cortex-A78 derivative + 4x 1.8 GHz Kryo 680 Silver – Cortex-A55 derivative); K40 Gaming: (1x 3.0 GHz Cortex-A78 + 3x 2.6 GHz Cortex-A78 + 4x 2.0 GHz Cortex-A55)
- GPU: K40/40S/Poco F3/F4: Adreno 650; K40 Pro/Pro+: Adreno 660; K40 Gaming: Mali-G77 MC9
- Memory: K40/Pro/Gaming/40S/Poco F3: 6, 8 or 12 GB RAM LPDDR5; Poco F3/Mi 11X/Poco F4: 6 or 8 GB RAM LPDDR5; K40 Pro+: 12 GB RAM LPDDR5; Mi 11i/11X Pro: 8 GB RAM LPDDR5; K40 Gaming: 6, 8 or 12 GB RAM LPDDR4X; Poco F3 GT: 6 or 8 GB RAM LPDDR4X
- Storage: 128 or 256 GB UFS 3.1
- Removable storage: None
- Battery: K40/Pro/Pro+/Poco F3: 4520 mAh; K40 Gaming: 5065 mAh; K40S/Poco F4: 4500 mAh
- Rear camera: Wide: K40/40S/Poco F3: 48 MP (f/1.8, 26 mm, 1/2", 0.8 μm); K40 Pro: 64 MP (f/1.9, 26 mm, 1/1.7", 0.8 μm); K40 Pro+: 108 MP (f/1.8, 26 mm, 1/1.52", 0.7 μm); K40 Gaming: 64 MP (f/1.7, 26 mm, 1/2.0", 0.7 μm); Poco F4: 64 MP (f/1.8, 26 mm, 0.7 μm); Ultrawide: K40/Pro/Pro+/40S/Poco F3/F4: 8 MP (f/2.2, 119°); K40 Gaming: 8 MP (f/2.2, 120°); Macro: K40/Pro/Pro+/Poco F3: 5 MP (f/2.4, 50mm, 1/5", 1.12 μm); K40 Gaming/40S/Poco F4: 2 MP (f/2.4); K40/Poco F3: 4K@30fps, 1080p@30/60/120/240/960fps, PDAF, gyro-EIS; K40 Pro/Pro+: 8K@30fps, 4K@30/60fps, 1080p@30/60/120/240/960fps, PDAF, gyro-EIS, HDR10+; K40 Gaming: 4K@30fps, 1080p@30/60/120fps, 720p@960fps, PDAF, gyro-EIS; K40S/Poco F4: 4K@30fps, 1080p@30/60/120fps, 720p@960fps, PDAF, OIS, gyro-EIS
- Front camera: 20 MP, (f/2.2, 27mm, 1/3.4", 0.8 μm); HDR, 1080p@30fps, 720p@120fps
- Display: 6.67 in (169 mm) AMOLED capacitive touchscreen, 1080p 1080 × 2400 pixels (2.5 MP), 20:9 aspect ratio (395 ppi), 120 Hz refresh rate, HDR10+
- Sound: Stereo loudspeakers
- Connectivity: Wi-Fi 802.11a/b/g/n/6/6e (2.4 & 5GHz), dual-band, WiFi Direct, DLNA, hotspot Bluetooth V5.1/5.2, A2DP, Low-energy, aptX-HD, NFC, USB 2.0 Type-C, Infrared Blaster, GNSS (A-GPS, GLONASS, GALILEO, BDS, QZSS, NAVIC)
- Data inputs: Fingerprint scanner (side-mounted); Accelerometer; Gyroscope; Proximity sensor; Barometer; Electronic compass; Color Spectrum
- Codename: K40/Poco F3: alioth Mi 11X: aliothin K40 Pro: haydn K40 Pro+/Mi 11i: haydn/haydnpro Mi 11X Pro: haydnin K40 Gaming/Poco F3 GT: ares K40S/Poco F4: munch

The Redmi K40 is a line of Android-based smartphones manufactured by Xiaomi and marketed under its Redmi sub-brand. There are several models, the K40, K40 Pro, K40 Pro+, K40 Gaming and K40S. In the global market the Redmi K40 was launched as Poco F3 and the Redmi K40 Pro+ was launched as Xiaomi Mi 11i. In April 2021 the Redmi K40 and K40 Pro+ were released in India as Xiaomi Mi 11X and Mi 11X Pro. In July 2021 the Redmi K40 Gaming was released globally as Poco F3 GT. The Redmi K40S was released globally as Poco F4 but with improved specs.

== Design ==
The front and back panels are made of Gorilla Glass 5, except in the Redmi K40S and Poco F4 where the back panel is made of plastic. The frame is made of aluminium and covered by polycarbonate.

The design of the Redmi K40, K40 Pro and K40 Pro+ is similar to the Mi 11. The design of the Redmi K40S is similar to the Redmi K50 and K50 Pro but with flat edges.

On the bottom side are a USB-C port, speaker, microphone and dual SIM tray. On the top side there are two additional microphones, IR blaster and second speaker. On the right side there are a volume rocker and a power button with an integrated fingerprint scanner.

The Redmi K40 Pro smartphone is fueled by a Non-removable Li-Po 4520 mAh battery. It comes with Fast charging 33W, 100% in 52 min (advertised), Power Delivery 3.0, and Quick Charge 3+.

=== Colours ===
- The Redmi K40 is available in 3 colours: Bright Black, Dreamland (silver) and Sunny Snow (white).
- The Redmi K40 Pro and K40 Pro+ are available in 3 colors: Ink Feather (black feather pattern), Dreamland (silver) and Sunny Snow (white).
- The Poco F3 is available in 3 colours: Night Black, Arctic White and Deep Ocean Blue. Also later was added Moonlight Silver variant which has the same design as Deep Ocean Blue but in silver colour.
- Xiaomi Mi 11 is available in 3 colours: Cosmic Black, Celestial Silver and Frosty White.
- Xiaomi Mi 11X and Mi 11X Pro are available in 3 colours: Cosmic Black, Celestial Silver and Lunar White.
- Redmi K40S is available in 4 colours: Bright Black, Silent Flower (green), Silver Traces and Magic Mirror (blue-purple gradient).
