= Redmi K60 =

2022 Android smartphones manufactured by Xiaomi

Redmi K60 (Poco F5 Pro) Redmi K60 Pro Redmi K60E
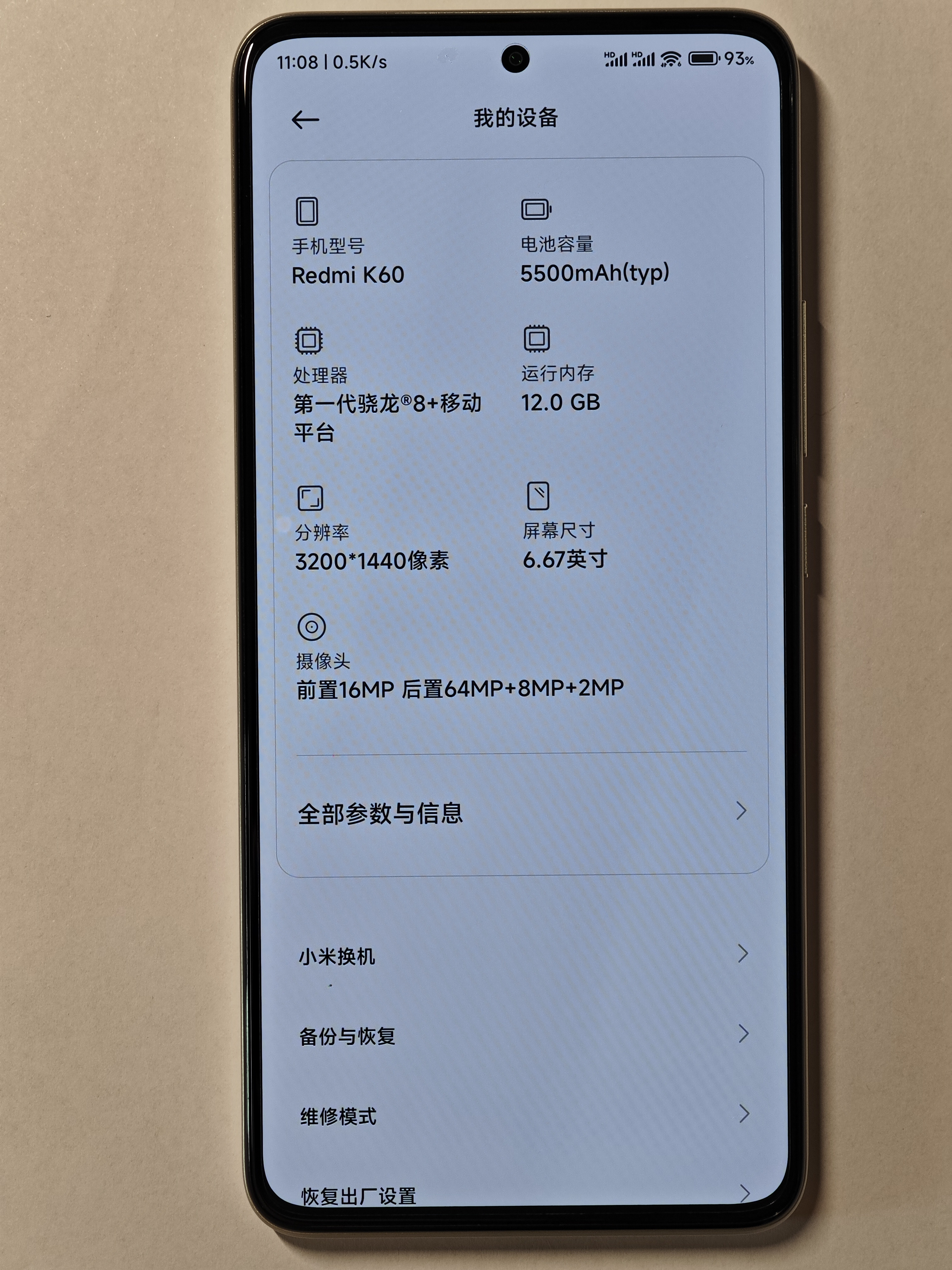
- The front of Redmi K60
- Brand: Redmi; Poco
- Manufacturer: Xiaomi
- Type: Phablet
- Series: Redmi K Poco F
- First released: K60/K60 Pro/K60E: January 1, 2023; 3 years ago Poco F5 Pro: May 9, 2023; 3 years ago
- Predecessor: Redmi K50
- Successor: Redmi K70
- Related: Poco F5
- Compatible networks: GSM / CDMA / HSPA / CDMA2000 / LTE / 5G
- Form factor: Slate
- Colors: K60: Quiet Mango, Clear Snow, Ink Feather, Plain Blue; K60 Pro: Quiet Mango, Clear Snow, Ink Feather, Redmi K60 Champion Performance Edition; K60E: Quiet Mango, Clear Snow, Ink Feather; Poco F5 Pro: white, black
- Dimensions: 162.8 mm (6.41 in) H 75.4 mm (2.97 in) W 8.6 mm (0.34 in) D
- Weight: 202 g (7.1 oz) (K60E) 204 g (7.2 oz) (K60/Poco F5 Pro) 205 g (7.2 oz) (K60 Pro)
- Operating system: Original: K60/K60 Pro: Android 13 with MIUI 14 K60E: Android 12 with MIUI 13 Poco F5 Pro: Android 13 with MIUI 14 for Poco; Current: K60/K60 Pro/Poco F5 Pro: Android 15 with Xiaomi HyperOS 3 K60E: Android 14 with Xiaomi HyperOS 2
- System-on-chip: K60/Poco F5 Pro: Qualcomm Snapdragon 8+ Gen 1 (4 nm); K60 Pro: Qualcomm Snapdragon 8 Gen 2 (4 nm); K60E: MediaTek Dimensity 8200 (4 nm)
- CPU: K60/Poco F5 Pro: Octa-core (1x3.0 GHz Cortex-X2 & 3x2.5 GHz Cortex-A710 & 4x1.80 GHz Cortex-A510); K60 Pro: Octa-core (1x3.2 GHz Cortex-X3 & 2x2.8 GHz Cortex-A715 & 2x2.8 GHz Cortex-A710 & 3x2.0 GHz Cortex-A510); K60E: Octa-core (1x3.1 GHz Cortex-A78 & 3x3.0 GHz Cortex-A78 & 4x2.0 GHz Cortex-A55)
- GPU: K60/Poco F5 Pro: Adreno 730; K60 Pro:Adreno 740; K60E: Mali-G610 MC6
- Memory: 8/12/16 GB RAM
- Storage: 128, 256, 512 GB
- Removable storage: None
- SIM: Dual SIM (Nano-SIM, dual stand-by)
- Battery: 5500 mAh (K60/K60E); 5000 mAh (K60 Pro); 5160 mAh (Poco F5 Pro)
- Charging: 67W Wired (K60/K60E/Poco F5 Pro), 120W Wired (K60 Pro); 30W Wireless (K60/K60 Pro/Poco F5 Pro); No Reverse Wireless Charging
- Rear camera: K60/Poco F5 Pro: 64 MP, f/1.8, (wide), 1/2", 0.7µm, PDAF, OIS (Omnivision OV64B); 8 MP, 120˚ (ultrawide); 2 MP, f/2.4, (macro); 8K@24fps, 4K@30/60fps, 1080p@30/60/120fps, 720p@960fps; gyro-EIS; K60 Pro: 50 MP, f/1.8, (wide), 1/1.56", 1.0µm, PDAF, OIS (Sony IMX800); 8 MP, 120˚ (ultrawide); 2 MP, f/2.4, (macro); 8K@24fps, 4K@30/60fps, 1080p@30/60/120fps, 720p@960fps; gyro-EIS; K60E: 48 MP, (wide), 1/2", 0.8µm, PDAF, OIS (Sony IMX582); 8 MP, 120˚ (ultrawide), 1/4", 1.12µm; 2 MP, f/2.4, (macro); 4K@30fps, 1080p@30/60/120fps, 720p@960fps, gyro-EIS; All: Dual-LED dual-tone flash, HDR, panorama
- Front camera: K60/K60 Pro/Poco F5 Pro: 16 MP, (wide), 1/3.06", 1.0µm; K60E: 20 MP, (wide), 1/2.0", 0.8µm; All: 1080p@30/60/120fps
- Display: 6.67 in (169 mm); OLED, 120Hz refresh rate, Dolby Vision, HDR10+, 1200 nits (peak); 1440 × 3200 px resolution, 20:9 ratio (~526 ppi density); 1920Hz low brightness dimming (K60/K60 Pro/Poco F5 Pro); Provided by Samsung Display(K60E); Provided by CSOT (K60/K60 Pro/Poco F5 Pro); Corning Gorilla Glass Victus (K60E); Corning Gorilla Glass 5 (K60/K60 Pro/Poco F5 Pro)
- Sound: Stereo speakers
- Connectivity: Wi-Fi 802.11 a/b/g/n/ac/6, dual-band, Wi-Fi Direct; Bluetooth 5.3, A2DP, LE. Wi-Fi 7 for K60 Pro
- Data inputs: Multi-touch screen; USB-C
- Water resistance: IP53, dust and splash resistant
- Codename: K60/Poco F5 Pro: mondrian; K60 Pro: socrates; K60E: rembrandt

The Redmi K60 is a series of Android-based smartphones manufactured by Xiaomi. These phones were announced on December 27, 2022. On the global market the Redmi K60 released as the Poco F5 Pro with a smaller battery.

== Design ==
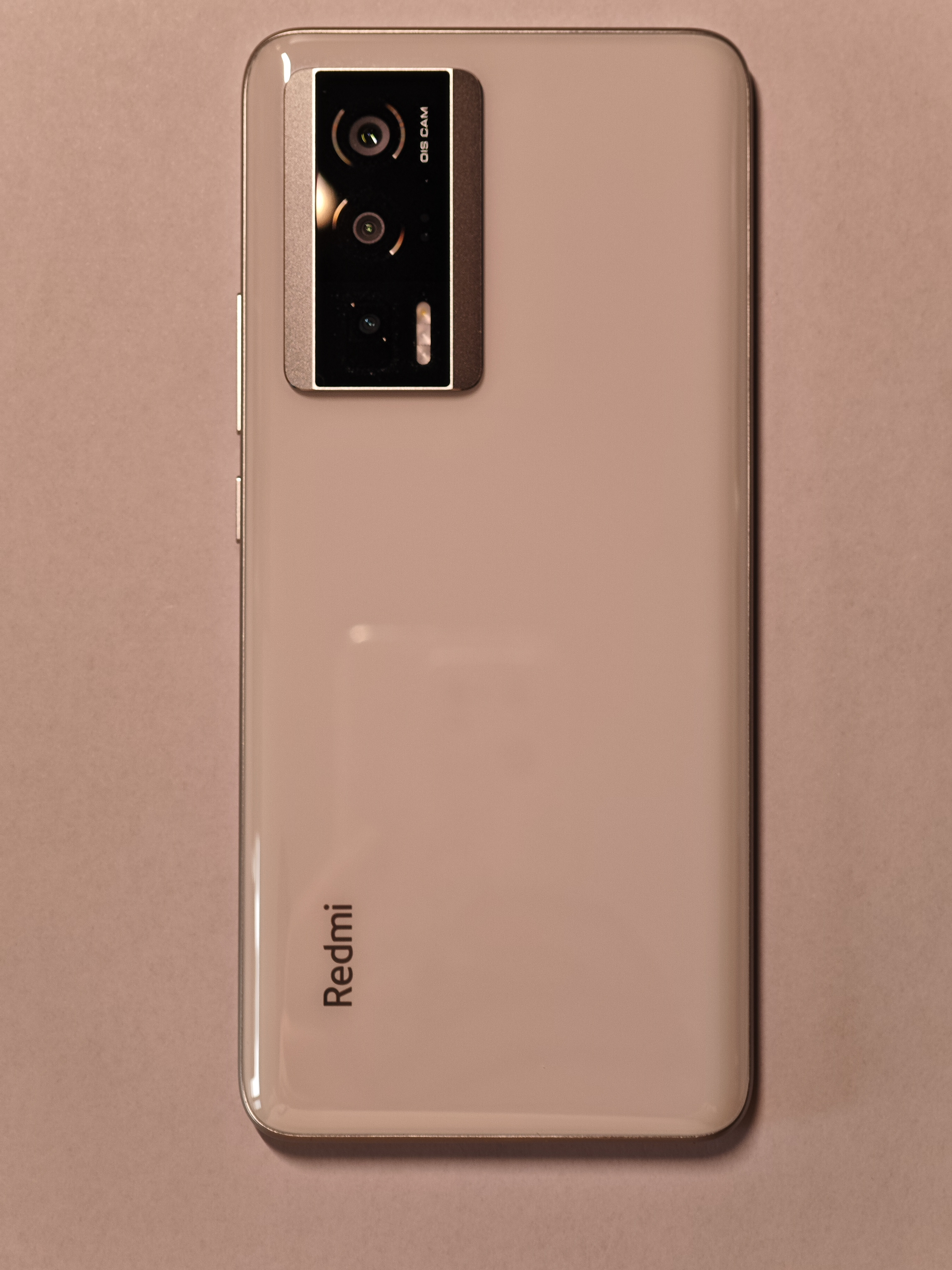
The back of the Redmi K60 in Clear Snow

The front of the Redmi K60, K60 Pro and Poco F5 Pro is made of Gorilla Glass 5, while the front of the Redmi K60E is made of Gorilla Glass Victus. The frame is made of polycarbonate. The back is made of glass, artificial leather on the Redmi K60 in Plain Blue, or artificial leather with glass strips on the Redmi K60 Pro Champion Performance Edition (the special edition of the Redmi K60 Pro).

On the bottom of smartphones, the user can find a USB-C port, a loudspeaker, a microphone and a dual SIM tray. On the top, there is an infrared blaster and an additional microphone. On the right, there is the volume rocker and the power button, which is also the fingerprint sensor on the Redmi K60E.

The Redmi K60, K60 Pro, and K60E came in 3 main colors: Quiet Mango (green; slightly darker on the K60E), Clear Snow (white), and Ink Feather (black with carbon-like patterns on the edges). Additionally, the Redmi K60 is available in a Plain Blue color with the back made of artificial leather and the Redmi K60 Pro features the Redmi K60 Champion Performance Edition, which succeeds Mercedes-AMG Petronas Formula One Team Edition from the Redmi K50 Pro, though without the partnership with Mercedes-AMG Petronas Formula One Team.

The Poco F5 Pro features only the black-colored option with carbon-like patterns on the edges and the white-colored option.

== Specifications ==
=== Hardware ===
The Redmi K60 features 8/12/16 GB of RAM and 128/256/512 GB of ROM depending on memory configuration. On the other hand, it has no dedicated slot for microSD cards.

The Redmi K60 has a non-removable 5500 mAh battery with 67 W fast charging. This device is powered by the Qualcomm SM8475 Snapdragon 8+ Gen 1 (4 nm) chipset.

The Redmi K60 phone has a triple-camera setup on the back. This formation consists of 48 MP+8 MP+2 MP. It has a 20 MP selfie camera inside the notch of the display. The video recording capability is 8K@24 fps, 4K@30/60 fps, 1080p@30/60/120/240/960 fps, 720p@1920 fps, gyro-EIS. That is to say, the Redmi K60 is 2G/3G/4G/5G supportable. The fingerprint sensor is under display.

Among the other features, there are WLAN, Bluetooth, GPS, face unlocking.

=== Software ===
The Redmi K60 and K60 Pro initially came with MIUI 14 skin based Android 13, the Redmi K60E came with MIUI 13 based on Android 12, and the Poco F5 Pro came with MIUI 14 for Poco based on Android 13. Later, all smartphones were updated to Xiaomi HyperOS 2 based on Android 14 on the Redmi K60E and based on Android 15 on the rest of models.
