= Redmi Pad =

Android tablet released in 2022

- Brand: Redmi
- Manufacturer: Xiaomi
- Type: Tablet computer
- Series: Redmi
- First released: October 5, 2022; 3 years ago
- Successor: None
- Compatible networks: No cellular connectivity
- Colors: Graphite Gray, Moonlight Silver, Mint Green
- Dimensions: 250.5 mm (9.86 in) H 158.1 mm (6.22 in) W 7.1 mm (0.28 in) D
- Weight: 465 g (16.4 oz)
- Operating system: Original: Android 12 with MIUI Pad 13.1; Upgradable: Android 14 with Xiaomi HyperOS
- System-on-chip: MediaTek MT8781 Helio G99 (6nm)
- CPU: Octa-core (2x2.2 GHz Cortex-A76 & 6x2.0 GHz Cortex-A55)
- GPU: Mali-G57 MC2
- Memory: 3, 4, and 6 GB RAM
- Storage: 64 and 128 GB
- Removable storage: microSDXC
- SIM: None
- Battery: Li-Po 8000 mAh
- Charging: Fast charging 18W
- Rear camera: 8 MP, f/2.0, (wide), AF; 1080p@30fps
- Front camera: 8 MP, f/2.3, 105° (ultrawide); 1080p@30fps
- Display: 10.61 in (269 mm); IPS LCD, 1B colors, 90Hz, 400 nits (typ); 1200 × 2000 px resolution, 5:3 ratio (~220 ppi density)
- Sound: Stereo speakers (4 speakers)
- Connectivity: Wi-Fi 802.11 a/b/g/n/ac, dual-band, Wi-Fi Direct, hotspot; Bluetooth 5.2, A2DP, LE
- Data inputs: Multi-touch screen; USB-C
- Website: www.mi.com/global/product/redmi-pad/

Redmi Pad is an Android tablet computer designed, marketed and manufactured by Xiaomi. This tablet computer was announced on October 4, 2022, it was released on October 5, 2022.

== Design ==
The tablet has glass front and aluminum unibody.

The design of the camera bump is similar to Redmi K50 and K50 Pro.

On the bottom side, there are USB-C and two speakers. On the top side, there are two speakers and a power button. On the right side there are a volume rocker, two microphones, and microSD tray.

Redmi Pad sold in 3 colours: Graphite Gray, Moonlight Silver, Mint Green.
