= Redmi K50 =

Smartphones manufactured by Xiaomi

Redmi K50 Redmi K50 Pro Redmi K50G (Poco F4 GT) Redmi K50i (Redmi Note 11T Pro in China; Poco X4 GT)
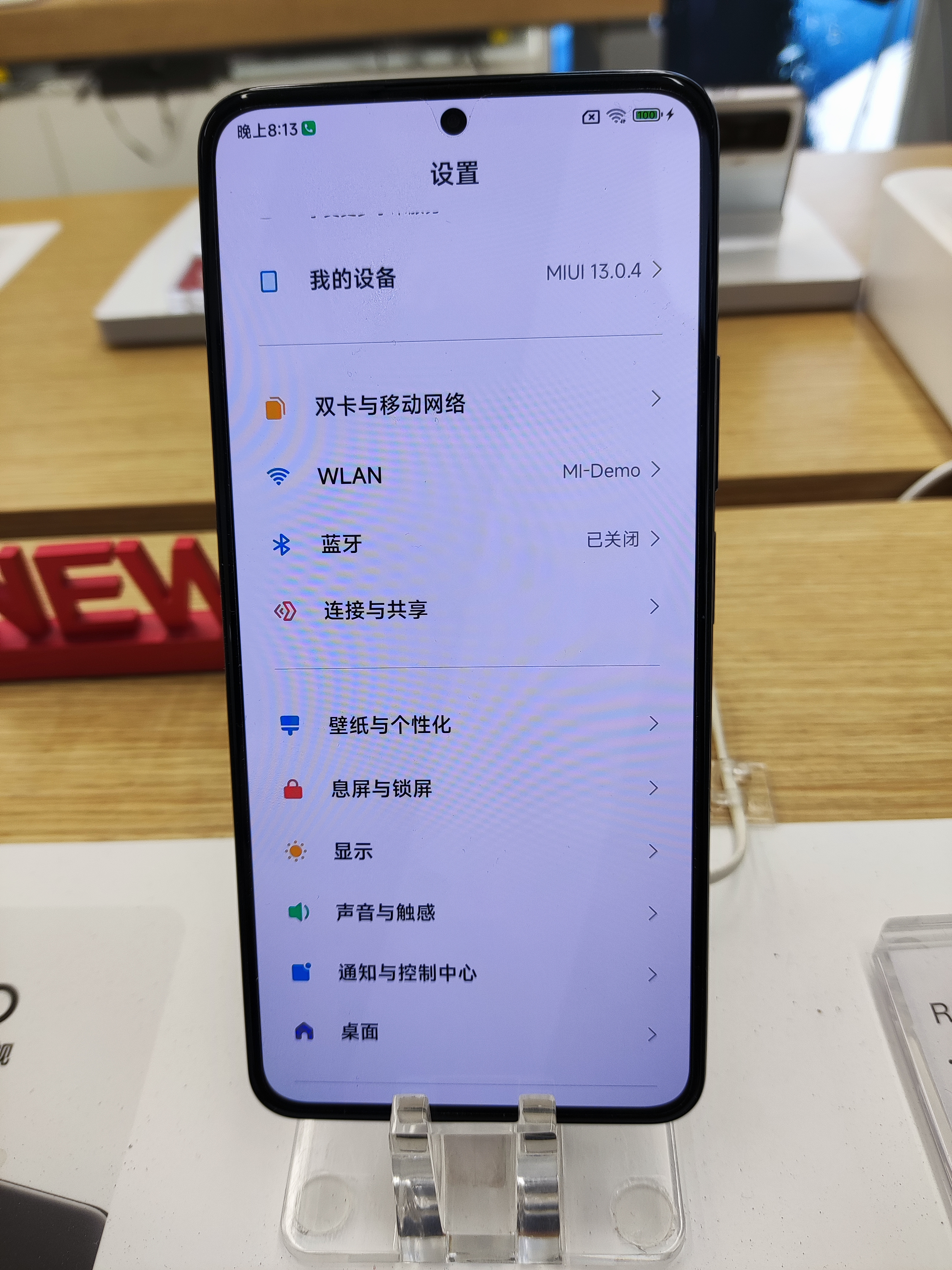
- Front of the Redmi K50
- Also known as: K50G: Redmi K50 Gaming
- Brand: Redmi
- Manufacturer: Xiaomi
- Type: Phablet
- Series: Redmi K Poco F
- First released: K50/Pro: March 17, 2022; 4 years ago K50G: February 16, 2022; 4 years ago Poco F4 GT: April 26, 2022; 4 years ago
- Predecessor: Redmi K40
- Successor: Redmi K60
- Related: Redmi K50 Ultra
- Compatible networks: GSM / CDMA / HSPA / CDMA2000 / LTE / 5G
- Form factor: Slate
- Dimensions: K50/K50 Pro: 163.1 mm (6.42 in) H 76.2 mm (3.00 in) W 8.5 mm (0.33 in) D; K50G/Poco F4 GT: 162.5 mm (6.40 in) H 76.7 mm (3.02 in) W 8.5 mm (0.33 in) D; K50i: 163.6 mm (6.44 in) H 74.3 mm (2.93 in) W 8.9 mm (0.35 in) D
- Weight: K50/Pro: 201 g (7.1 oz); K50G/Poco F4 GT: 210 g (7.4 oz); K50i: 200 g (7.1 oz)
- Operating system: Original: K50/Pro/50G/50i: Android 12 with MIUI 13; Poco F4 GT:Android 12 with MIUI 13 for Poco; Current: Android 14 with Xiaomi HyperOS 2
- System-on-chip: K50: MediaTek Dimensity 8100 (5 nm); K50G/Poco F4 GT: Snapdragon 8 Gen 1 (4 nm); K50 Pro: MediaTek Dimensity 9000 (4 nm); K50i: MediaTek Dimensity 8100 (5 nm)
- CPU: K50: Octa-core (4x2.85 GHz Cortex-A78 & 4x2.0 GHz Cortex-A55); K50G/Poco F4 GT: Octa-core (1x3.00 GHz Cortex-X2 & 3x2.50 GHz Cortex-A710 & 4x1.80 GHz Cortex-A510); K50 Pro: Octa-core (1x3.05 GHz Cortex-X2 & 3x2.85 GHz Cortex-A710 & 4x1.80 GHz Cortex-A510); K50i: Octa-core (4x2.85 GHz Cortex-A78 & 4x2.0 GHz Cortex-A55)
- GPU: K50: Mali-G610; K50G/Poco F4 GT: Adreno 730; K50 Pro: Mali-G710 MC10; K50i: Mali-G610 MC6
- Memory: 6 GB, 8 GB, 12 GB RAM
- Storage: K50/Pro: 128 GB, 256 GB, 512 GB; K50G/Poco F4 GT/K50i: 128 GB, 256 GB; UFS 3.1
- Removable storage: None
- SIM: Dual SIM (Nano-SIM, dual stand-by)
- Battery: K50: 5500 mAh; K50 Pro: 5000 mAh; K50G/Poco F4 GT: 4700 mAh; K50i: 5080 mAh
- Charging: K50/50G/Poco F4 GT/K50i: Fast charging 67W; K50 Pro: Fast charging 120W
- Rear camera: K50: 48 MP, (wide), 1/2", 0.8 μm, PDAF, OIS 8 MP, 119˚ (ultrawide) 2 MP, f/2.4, (macro); K50G/Poco F4 GT/K50i: 64 MP, f/1.7, 26mm (wide), 1/1.73", 0.8 μm, PDAF 8 MP, f/2.2, 120˚ (ultrawide) 2 MP, f/2.4, (macro); K50 Pro: 108 MP, (wide), 1/1.52", 0.7 μm, PDAF, OIS 8 MP, 119˚ (ultrawide) 2 MP, f/2.4, (macro); All: Dual-LED dual-tone flash, HDR, panorama 4K@30fps, 1080p@30/60/120fps, 720p@960fps; gyro-EIS
- Front camera: K50/K50G/K50 Pro: 20 MP, (wide); K50i: 16 MP f/2.5 (wide); 1080p@30/120fps
- Display: K50/K50G/K50 Pro: 6.67 in (169 mm); K50i: 6.6 in (170 mm); K50/Pro: 1440 x 3200 pixels, 20:9 ratio (~526 ppi density) K50G/Poco F4 GT: 1080 x 2400 pixels, 20:9 ratio (~395 ppi density); K50i: 1080 x 2460 pixels; All: Corning Gorilla Glass Victus OLED, 120Hz refresh rate, Dolby Vision, HDR10+, 1200 nits (peak)
- Sound: Stereo speakers
- Connectivity: Wi-Fi 802.11 a/b/g/n/ac/6, dual-band, Wi-Fi Direct, hotspot Bluetooth 5.3, A2DP, LE; A-GPS. Up to tri-band: GLONASS, BDS, GALILEO, QZSS, NavIC
- Data inputs: Multi-touch screen USB Type-C 2.0
- Water resistance: IP53

The Redmi K50 is a line of Android-based smartphones manufactured by Xiaomi and marketed under its Redmi sub-brand. The lineup includes the base Redmi K50 model, the more advanced Redmi K50 Pro, the gaming-focused Redmi K50G (also known as Redmi K50 Gaming), and the lite Redmi K50i model. The Redmi K50G was launched globally as the Poco F4 GT.

== Gallery ==
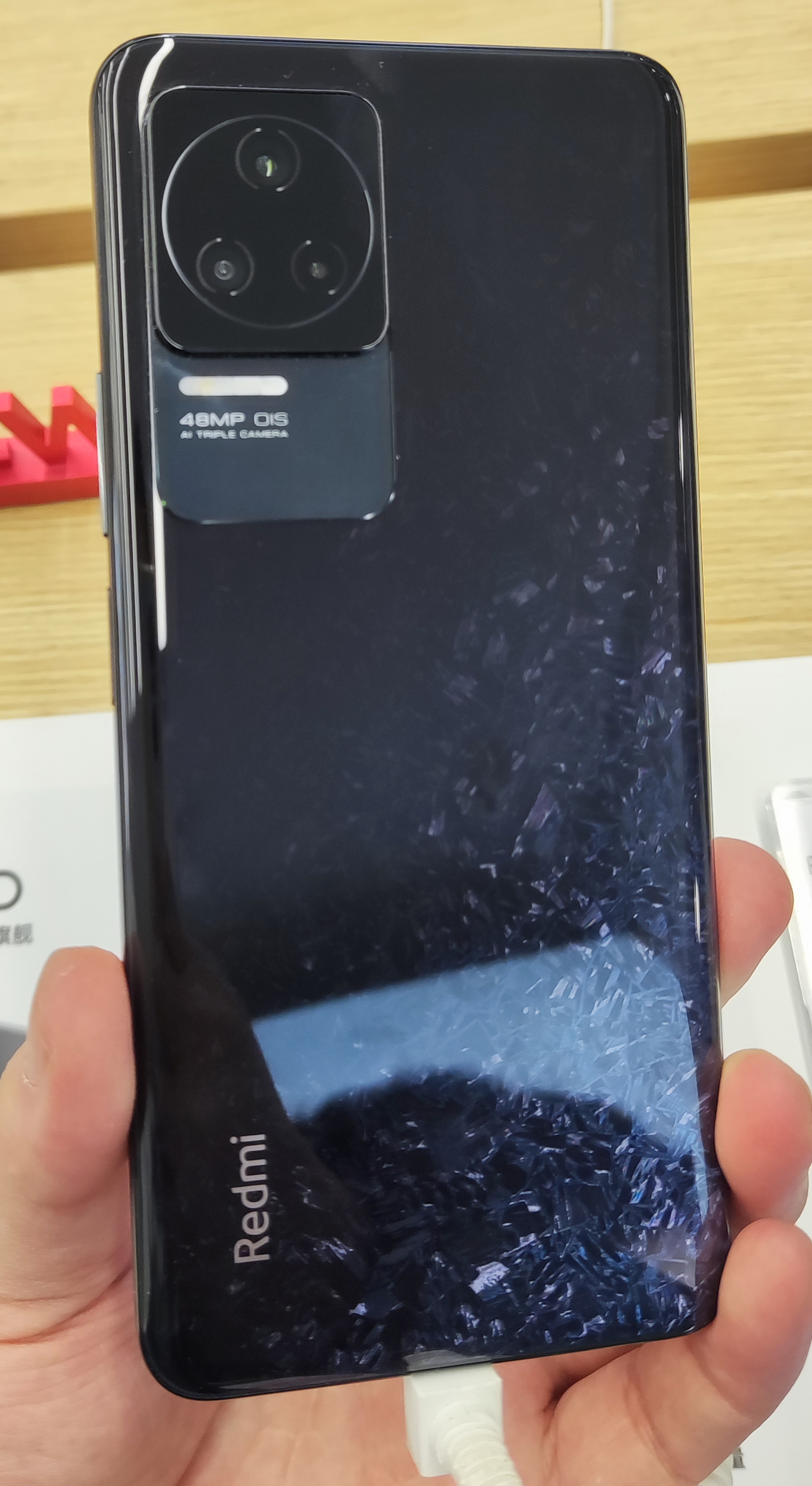
Back of the Redmi K50

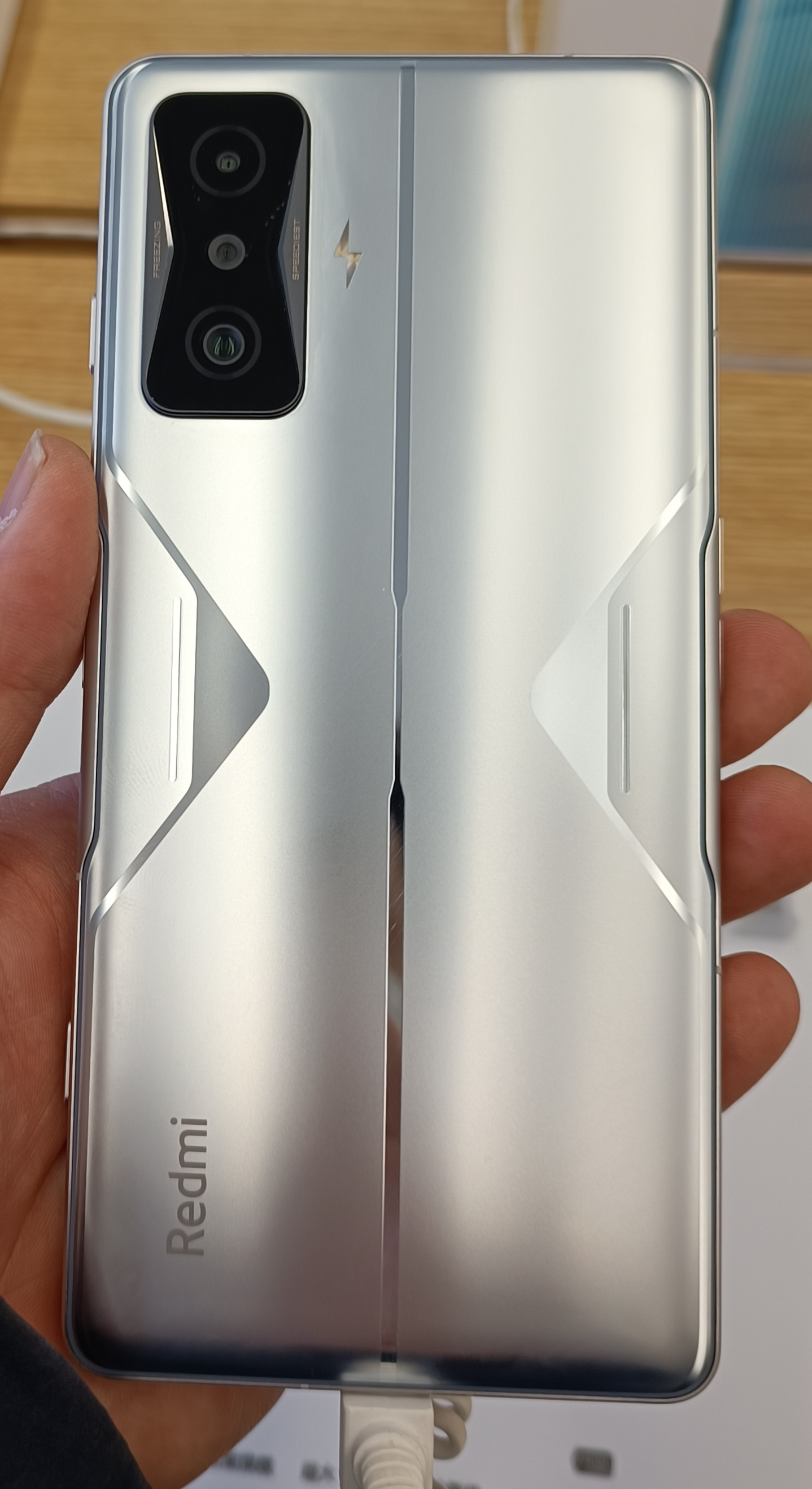
Back of the Redmi K50G
