= MPE =

MPE may refer to:

- Malignant pleural effusion
- Markov perfect equilibrium, in game theory
- Mass Production Evangelion, a series of biomechanical mecha that appear in The End of Evangelion
- Max Planck Institute for Extraterrestrial Physics, a German research institute
- Maximum permissible exposure, the highest power of a light source that is considered safe
- Mean percentage error, in statistics
- Media processing engine, short MPE, is an image/video processor
- Methidiumpropyl-EDTA, a chemical that can intercalate and cleave DNA
- MIDI Polyphonic Expression, a MIDI specification to provide more expressive qualities for performing music
- Minimum polynomial extrapolation, a sequence transformation algorithm used for convergence acceleration of vector sequences
- Miss Philippines Earth
- Molecular pathological epidemiology, an interdisciplinary integration of molecular pathology and epidemiologylect
- Mors Principium Est, a Finnish melodic death metal band
- HP Multi-Programming Executive, a business-oriented minicomputer operating system made by Hewlett-Packard
- Multiprotocol Encapsulation, a Data link layer protocol
- Mumbai–Pune Expressway, an Indian motorway
- Myxopapillary ependymoma, a tumor of the central nervous system
- Phaswane Mpe (1970–2004), South African author
- The IATA airport code for the defunct Griswold Airport in Madison, Connecticut
- The Federal Aviation Administration Location identifier for Philadelphia Municipal Airport, an airport located in Philadelphia, Mississippi
- .MPE, alternative file extension for .MPG files by Minolta depending on color space
