= Xiaomi 13T Pro =

2023 flagship smartphone by Xiaomi running HyperOS

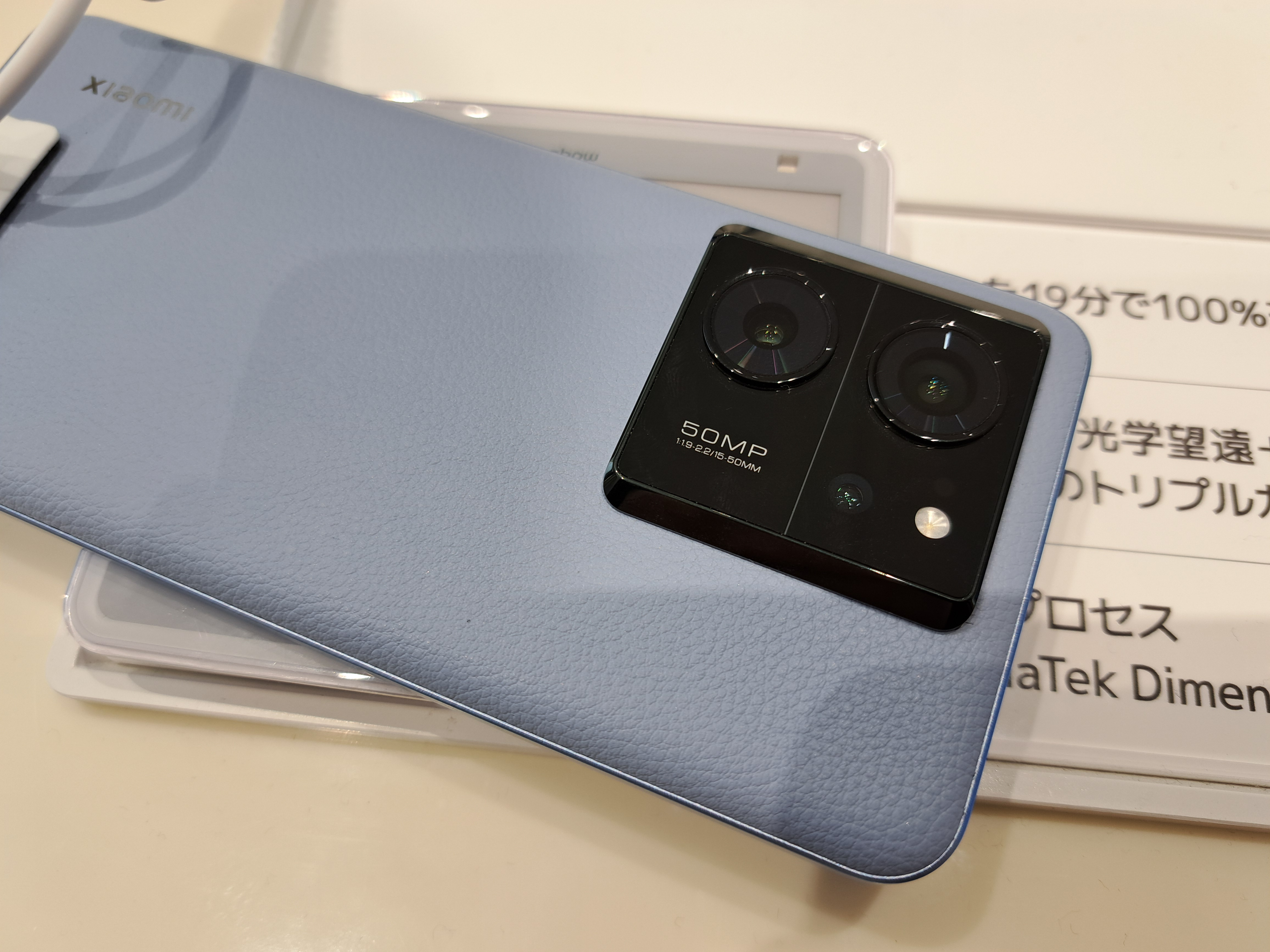
- Xiaomi 13T Pro in Alpine Blue
- Developer: Xiaomi
- Manufacturer: Xiaomi
- Type: Smartphone
- Series: Xiaomi T Series
- First released: September 26, 2023; 2 years ago
- Predecessor: Xiaomi 12T Pro
- Successor: Xiaomi 14T Pro
- Compatible networks: GSM / HSPA / LTE / 5G
- Form factor: Slate
- Colors: Alpine Blue; Meadow Green; Black
- Dimensions: 162.2 mm × 75.7 mm × 8.5 mm (6.39 in × 2.98 in × 0.33 in)
- Weight: 200 g (7.1 oz) or 206 g (7.3 oz) (depending on variant)
- Operating system: Android 13 with HyperOS; Up to 4 major Android upgrades
- System-on-chip: Mediatek Dimensity 9200+ (4 nm)
- CPU: Octa-core (1x3.35 GHz Cortex-X3 & 3x3.0 GHz Cortex-A715 & 4x2.0 GHz Cortex-A510)
- GPU: Immortalis-G715 MC11
- Memory: 12 GB or 16 GB LPDDR5X
- Storage: 256 GB, 512 GB or 1 TB UFS 4.0
- SIM: Nano-SIM + eSIM; Nano-SIM + Nano-SIM
- Battery: 5000 mAh Li-Po
- Charging: 120W wired (PD3.0, QC4) – 100% in 19 min
- Rear camera: Triple-Camera Setup; Primary: Sony IMX 707; 50 MP (7P lens), f/1.9, 24mm, 1/1.28", 1.22 µm, PDAF, OIS; Telephoto: OmniVision PureCel®Plus‑S OV50D; 50 MP (5P lens), f/1.9, 50mm, 1/2.88", 0.61 µm, PDAF, 2x optical zoom; Ultrawide: OmniVision PureCel®Plus OV13B; 12 MP (5P lens), f/2.2, 15mm, 1/3.06", 1.12 µm, FF; Camera features: Leica lens, color spectrum sensor, LED flash, HDR, Panorama; Video recording: 8K@24fps, 4K@24/30/60fps, 4K/1080p@30fps HDR10+, 1080p@30/60/120/240fps; 10-bit LOG, gyro-EIS
- Front camera: Sony IMX 596; 20 MP (5P lens), f/2.2, 26mm (wide), 1/3.47", 0.8 µm, FF; Camera features: HDR; Video recording: 1080p@30fps, HDR10+
- Display: 6.67 in (169 mm) AMOLED, 68B colors 1220 × 2712 px, 144Hz refresh rate Dolby Vision, HDR10+, 2600 nits peak brightness Corning Gorilla Glass 5
- Sound: Stereo speakers 24-bit/192kHz Hi-Res Audio
- Connectivity: Wi-Fi 802.11 a/b/g/n/ac/6e/7 (dual/tri-band by region); Bluetooth 5.4; NFC; Infrared port USB-C 2.0 OTG; GPS (L1+L5), GLONASS, BDS, Galileo, NavIC
- Water resistance: IP68 dust/water resistant (up to 1.5 m for 30 minutes)
- Other: Under-display fingerprint sensor, plastic frame, glass or silicone polymer back
- Website: mi.com/global/

Xiaomi 13T Pro is a premium Android smartphone developed by Xiaomi and part of the Xiaomi T Series. It was officially announced and released on September 26, 2023, and serves as the successor to the Xiaomi 12T Pro. The 13T Pro introduces several flagship-level upgrades including a high-refresh AMOLED display, Leica-tuned triple camera setup, and ultra-fast 120W charging.

Powered by the MediaTek Dimensity 9200+ chipset, the Xiaomi 13T Pro runs on Android 13 with HyperOS, Xiaomi's in-house custom skin. It is available in multiple memory configurations, with up to 1 TB of UFS 4.0 storage and 16 GB RAM.

The phone features a 6.67-inch AMOLED display with a resolution of 1220×2712 pixels and support for Dolby Vision and HDR10+. The rear camera system includes a 50 MP wide sensor, a 50 MP telephoto lens with 2x optical zoom, and a 12 MP ultrawide lens, all co-engineered with Leica. It can record up to 8K video.

The Xiaomi 13T Pro supports 120W wired charging, capable of charging its 5000 mAh battery to 100% in 19 minutes. Other features include stereo speakers, IP68 water resistance, and connectivity support for Wi-Fi 7, Bluetooth 5.4, and dual SIM including eSIM functionality.
