= Methidiumpropyl-EDTA =

Names
- IUPAC name 3,8-Diamino-6-[4-[13-carboxy-9,12-bis(carboxymethyl)-1,7-dioxo-2,6,9,12-tetraazatridec-1-yl]phenyl]-5-methylphenanthridinium
- Other names MPE

Identifiers
CAS Number	80082-09-3
3D model (JSmol)	Interactive image
ChemSpider	3620842
ECHA InfoCard	100.149.943
EC Number	621-055-2
PubChem CID	4420455
- InChI: InChI=1S/C34H39N7O8/c1-39-28-16-24(36)8-10-26(28)25-9-7-23(35)15-27(25)33(39)21-3-5-22(6-4-21)34(49)38-12-2-11-37-29(42)17-40(18-30(43)44)13-14-41(19-31(45)46)20-32(47)48/h3-10,15-16,36H,2,11-14,17-20H2,1H3,(H7,35,37,38,42,43,44,45,46,47,48,49)/p+1 Key: XONAOTJPKINJQH-UHFFFAOYSA-O
- SMILES: O=C(O)CN(CC(=O)O)CCN(CC(=O)O)CC(=O)NCCCNC(=O)C1=CC=C(C=C1)C=2C3=CC(N)=CC=C3C=4C=CC(N)=CC4[N+]2C

Properties
Chemical formula	C_{34}H_{40}N_{7}O_{8}^{+}
Molar mass	674.734 g·mol^{−1}
- Except where otherwise noted, data are given for materials in their standard state (at 25 °C [77 °F], 100 kPa). Infobox references

Methidiumpropyl-EDTA (MPE) is composed of the DNA intercalator methidium covalently attached to the metal chelator ethylenediaminetetraacetic acid (EDTA) by a short linker. MPE nonspecifically binds and cleaves DNA at multiple locations.

== See also ==
- Ethidium bromide
