= Infrared blaster =

IR LED used in universal remotes

IR blaster with standard 3.5 mm plug

IR blaster attached to a cable TV tuner

An infrared blaster (IR blaster) is a device that relays commands from a remote control to one or more devices that require infrared remote control. For instance, it may also allow radio-frequency-based (RF) remotes (including those using Bluetooth) to control infra-red-based components. It may also allow one device to control another: A recording device, such as a DVR or VCR, might change the channel on an external tuner (such as a cable box or satellite television receiver). This way, the receiving device can automatically be set to the correct channel before the recording process starts. An IR blaster can be used to implement remote control of components from a mobile phone, tablet, or computer.

== Description ==
The blaster itself is a combination of a receiving unit (which takes remote commands via wire or RF) and one or more infra-red-light emitters that relay those commands to the devices to be controlled. Often the receiver is a small unit that sits on or near those devices, which offers one or more jacks into which small IR emitter modules are plugged. Those emitters are then placed so that they can shine infra-red light on the IR sensors of the devices, either directly or bounced off a surface such as a cabinet door.

If the remote control to be used is also IR-based, there must be an IR sensor within its line of sight that will relay signals to the IR blaster over a wire or radio.

The output of an IR blaster (like that of any infra-red remote) is invisible to the human eye because its wavelength is beyond the range of visible light. The signal does not affect the human body and has no side effects for long exposure.

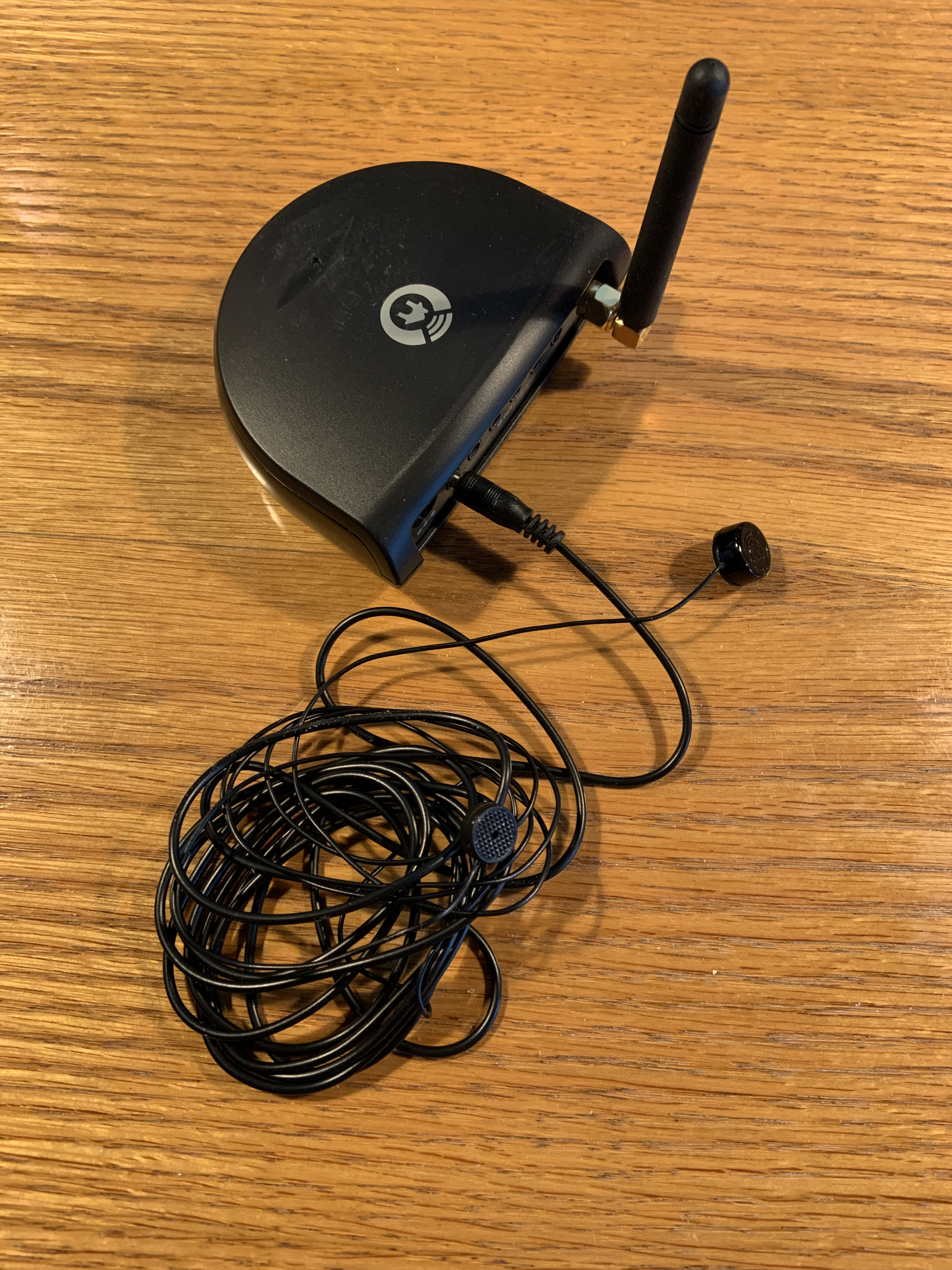
Nevo REX-433 IR blaster with one IR emitter plugged in, for use with Nevo C3 remote via RF

== Applications ==
IR blasters are deployed to control infra-red-only devices from a remote control that wouldn't normally be able to do so, either because it is out of the line of sight or because it does not communicate with infra-red signals. An IR blaster can be used to control devices such as television sets, DVD players, DVRs, air conditioners, or almost any IR-controlled appliance. One common use of an IR blaster is to control components that are secured in an equipment closet or another room.

Today, many new devices use RF-based remote control or control over HDMI via Consumer Electronics Control (CEC). Over time, RF blasters will likely find the most use controlling older, "legacy" equipment.

=== IR Blasters in Phones ===
Historically, IR blasters were included in flagship phones as a way to control televisions or speakers directly using the phone, bypassing the need of a remote. Gradually, this use case became obsolete as Bluetooth and network-based phone-to-television and phone-to-peripheral communication replaced it.
