= Xiaomi HyperOS =

Android-based operating system developed by Xiaomi

- Screenshot Screenshot of Xiaomi HyperOS 3 home screen
- Developer: Xiaomi Inc.
- OS family: Android (Linux)
- Working state: Current
- Source model: Open-source
- Initial release: 26 October 2023; 3 years ago
- Latest release: See Versions section for device and region dependent letter codes. 4.0.33.0 (HyperOS 4) 20 November 2026; 1 day ago (China); 4.0.11.0 (HyperOS 4) 21 November 2026; 0 days ago (Global); 3.0.335.0 (HyperOS 3.1) 12 October 2026; 40 days ago (India)
- Latest preview: OS4.0.261115.1.XOJMIXM.PRE (HyperOS 4.0) / 15 November 2026; 6 days ago
- Marketing target: Smartphones, tablet computers, automobiles, IoT devices, smart home products
- Available in: 82 languages (varies by country)
- Update method: Over-the-air
- Package manager: Android application package
- Supported platforms: ARM64
- Kernel type: Monolithic (Linux)
- Default user interface: Graphical
- License: Proprietary
- Preceded by: MIUI
- Official website: mi.com/global/hyperos (Global) hyperos.mi.com (Mainland China)

Xiaomi HyperOS
- Chinese: 小米澎湃OS
- Literal meaning: Xiaomi Surge OS
Transcriptions
Standard Mandarin
- Hanyu Pinyin: Xiǎomǐ Péngpài OS
- Bopomofo: ㄒㄧㄠˇㄇㄧˇㄆㄥˊㄆㄞˋ
- Tongyong Pinyin: Siaomi Pengpai OS

HyperOS
- Chinese: 澎湃OS
- Literal meaning: Surge OS
Transcriptions
Standard Mandarin
- Hanyu Pinyin: Péngpài OS
- Bopomofo: ㄆㄥㄆㄞ˙
- Tongyong Pinyin: Pengpai OS

Xiaomi HyperOS (Chinese: 小米澎湃OS; pinyin: Xiǎomǐ Péngpài OS), sometimes shortened to HyperOS (Chinese: 澎湃OS; pinyin: Péngpài OS; lit. 'Surge OS'), is an operating system developed by Xiaomi. It is based on Android and unifies MIUI, Vela OS, Mina OS and operating system software architectures including IoT devices and automobiles. It was announced on 17 October 2023, and debuted alongside Xiaomi 14 Series on 26 October 2023. It succeeded MIUI as Xiaomi's mobile operating system.

Different versions of HyperOS are developed for different regions: China, EEA (Europe), India, and a Global version. For each region, Xiaomi devices have different HyperOS implementations. The EEA version differs from the Global version in meeting specific EEA regulations for mobile phones regarding advertising and other issues.

== History ==
In 2017, Xiaomi began developing Vela OS, a unified software platform designed to be used with its own IoT devices. It is based on NuttX and was announced in 2020. In 2019, Xiaomi pre-developed Mina OS, a microkernel security system. In 2021, following its decision to make automobiles, Xiaomi was developing its own car-focused operating system.

In 2022, Xiaomi decided to unify the aforementioned operating systems' software architecture, and HyperOS has finished its research and development.

The new operating system was announced on X and Weibo on 17 October 2023, and debuted alongside Xiaomi 14 Series on 26 October 2023. HyperOS was then officially launched in Beijing, with the first batch of compatible models announced. HyperOS was launched globally at Mobile World Congress Barcelona in March 2024.

== Development ==
=== Technical white paper ===
On 7 December 2023, Xiaomi held a HyperOS experience communication meeting, explaining some details, underlying technical architecture, current and future functions and designs of HyperOS.

=== Alleged name change before release ===
In August 2023, during the promotional phase of the Redmi K60 Extreme Edition after its release, Xiaomi stated that this phone would be among the first to upgrade to MIUI 15, promising five years of OTA updates. However, Xiaomi ultimately did not release MIUI 15 but instead officially announced Xiaomi HyperOS. Some netizens believed that Xiaomi HyperOS was a temporary rebranding of MIUI 15 for promotional convenience. Additionally, on 4 November 2023, during a Bilibili live stream by the Chinese digital media Geekerwan, the host Yunfei revealed that the system version sent for media testing in September for the Snapdragon 8 Gen 3 was MIUI 15, not HyperOS.

Xiaomi has not explained the cancellation of MIUI 15, and the promotional material regarding the five-year system OTA updates for the Redmi K60 Extreme Edition has not been retracted. On 1 December 2023, the first official version of Xiaomi HyperOS was pushed to this model.

=== Alleged "Android shell" ===
Similar to old versions of Huawei's dual-framework HarmonyOS, Xiaomi HyperOS faced widespread netizen controversy over whether it was entirely self-developed and accusations of being an "Android shell" upon its unveiling. Addressing this controversy, Jin Fan, Vice President of Xiaomi Group's Mobile Department and head of the System Software Department, stated in an interview with Flypig that Xiaomi has the capability to use its own kernel or Linux to launch an operating system functionally and UI-wise identical to the released HyperOS. He suggested that the reason Xiaomi uses the Android kernel for phones and tablets is due to considerations of the existing software ecosystem.

== Versions ==
As for MIUI, there are HyperOS versions for different regions: China, India, EEA (Europe) and a Global version. EEA HyperOS, in particular, supports EEA phone regulations such as for GDPR and restricting advertising. HyperOS versions are specific to a region and to a particular device model. Xiaomi makes communication devices under three brands, which all support HyperOS: Xiaomi, Redmi, and Poco; Poco phones and tablets are global versions of devices sold as Redmi in China.

The version code consists of the release number followed by seven letters. The first letter identifies the Android version it is based on, the second and third letters specify the device model, the fourth and fifth letters the region, and the last two letters the mobile operator, or "XM" if not locked to any operator. For example, 3.0.303.0.WPQEUXM W - based on Android 16, PQ - Device Codename (Redmi Note 15 5G), EU - Region (Europe/EEA). XM - Unlocked (carrier free) A list of the latest releases for different models and regions is maintained.

=== Custom versions ===
An organization named Xiaomi Europe, using the domain xiaomi.eu and working officially with Xiaomi despite not being affiliated with the Chinese company, was set up in 2010 as a community for English-language Xiaomi users with phones running MIUI, and later HyperOS, associated with an Android version, with discussion forums. The website issues its own debloated and improved versions of Xiaomi ROM images based on China ROMs for devices using Qualcomm Snapdragon hardware. Weekly beta versions of MIUI and HyperOS were also issued, but Xiaomi later stopped making their HyperOS beta code available. Installing an unofficial ROM image on an Android phone is technically challenging, requiring the bootloader to be unlocked and the firmware flashed.

xiaomi.eu states that their ROMs were approved by the official EU distributor ABC Data to not void warranty for devices sold by them. According to a xiaomi.eu leader in 2021, the official ROM must be flashed and the bootloader locked before returning a device for warranty repair.

There are other customised versions of HyperOS for Xiaomi devices, and also other Synchronised custom Android ROMs can be installed on Xiaomi phones.

=== Version history ===
Version	Screenshot	Android version	Date of release	Latest release	Notable change
HyperOS 1		13–15	17 October 2023	1.1.4.0 (Global); 1.0.50.0 (China)	Initial release of HyperOS; Redesigned icons; New Control Center; Dropped devices running Android 12; DEV release is replaced by Beta release starting in 24.7.28
HyperOS 2		14–16	29 October 2024	2.0.227.0 (Global); 2.0.222.0 (China)	Redesigned several UI elements; Improved animations; Added status bar elements customization; Dropped devices running Android 13
HyperOS 3		15–16	29 August 2025	3.0.20.0 (Global); 3.0.15.0 (China)	Redesigned icons; Redesigned several UI elements; Introduced a new default lock screen style; Introduced Xiaomi HyperIsland, which offers capabilities similar Dynamic Island capabilities; Added a search button to the home screen; Added style setups; Added cross-device interconnectivity with Apple devices; Improved animations; Improved the Gallery app; Improved the split-screen experience for tablets; Dropped devices running Android 14
HyperOS 3.1		16-17	4 March 2026	3.0.337.0 (Global); 3.0.319.0 (China)	Based on Android 16; Android 17 and HyperOS 3.1 were released only on three devices: Xiaomi 15T Pro, 17 and 17 Ultra; Introduced native Android Live Updates API support for HyperIsland; Added a new system Password Manager app; Rewrote Gallery and Weather apps in Rust for improved performance; Added native Apple AirPods integration with pop-up connection support; Introduced cross-device calling with iPhone; Added stacked cards style for recent apps interface; Improved gesture navigation responsiveness; Added advanced permission controls for background access; Added Google search bar to the home screen; Dropped devices running Android 15 for some that does not support this version.
HyperOS 4		17	15 October 2026	4.0.11.0 (Global); 4.0.33.0 (China)	Introduced the Soft Light Glass effect across the system UI; Added a visual style toggle in settings between Soft light glass and frosted glass materials; Added interactive micro-animations and glow effects to home screen app icons; Redesigned lock screen management to stack notifications vertically beneath the clock; Upgraded Super XiaoAi 2.0 with a multi-step "Expert Mode" for advanced tasks; Added an "Inspiration Ball" contextual gesture tool to scan on-screen content; Enabled Dual-Phone Connectivity Sharing for unified call and OTP syncing between devices; Optimized system memory via an AI Preloading engine to boost overall launch speeds; Dropped devices running Android 16

== Region Settings and Updates ==
If the region is set to South Korea, updates become very slow or may not appear at all. You need to set your region to Hong Kong, Macau, Taiwan, the United Kingdom, or the United States to receive updates properly. If you set only the language you want, there is no problem even if you set it to a different region.

== Unlocking the bootloader ==
Bootloader unlocking of an Android device allows the firmware to be changed to a custom ROM different from the official Xiaomi firmware, and can permit privileged access by a process known as rooting. Rooting carries risk in case of a malicious exploit.

Xiaomi has procedures to allow users to unlock the bootloader of devices. To prevent users from using their devices how they want to, push advertisements and collect user location and device data, and to avoid some users attributing to Xiaomi bugs due to modifying the system, Xiaomi has gradually restricted the ability to unlock the bootloader since the release of HyperOS. Also, HyperOS updates, or upgrades from MIUI, are not available over-the-air (OTA) for unlocked phones, but can be downloaded.

The procedure for unlocking the bootloader changes from time to time, becoming more restrictive, particularly for devices sold in China. Significant changes were made in 2025. Only one device per year per account can have the bootloader unlocked. Procedures have to be completed within a specified time frame, and errors may result in becoming permanently unable to unlock the bootloader. Full details for 2025 are available. After a successful bootloader unlock, face and fingerprint unlock will become unavailable, the Xiaomi Find Device service will be disabled, and Google Pay and some other features may stop working.

XDA Developers has ongoing forum discussions on unlocking the Xiaomi bootloader without going through the company's procedure.

== See also ==
- List of custom Android distributions
- Comparison of mobile operating systems
- List of free and open-source Android applications
