= Redmi 10 5G =

2022 Android smartphone made by Xiaomi

Redmi 10 5G (Redmi Note 11E in China) Redmi 11 Prime 5G Poco M4 5G (Redmi Note 11R in China)
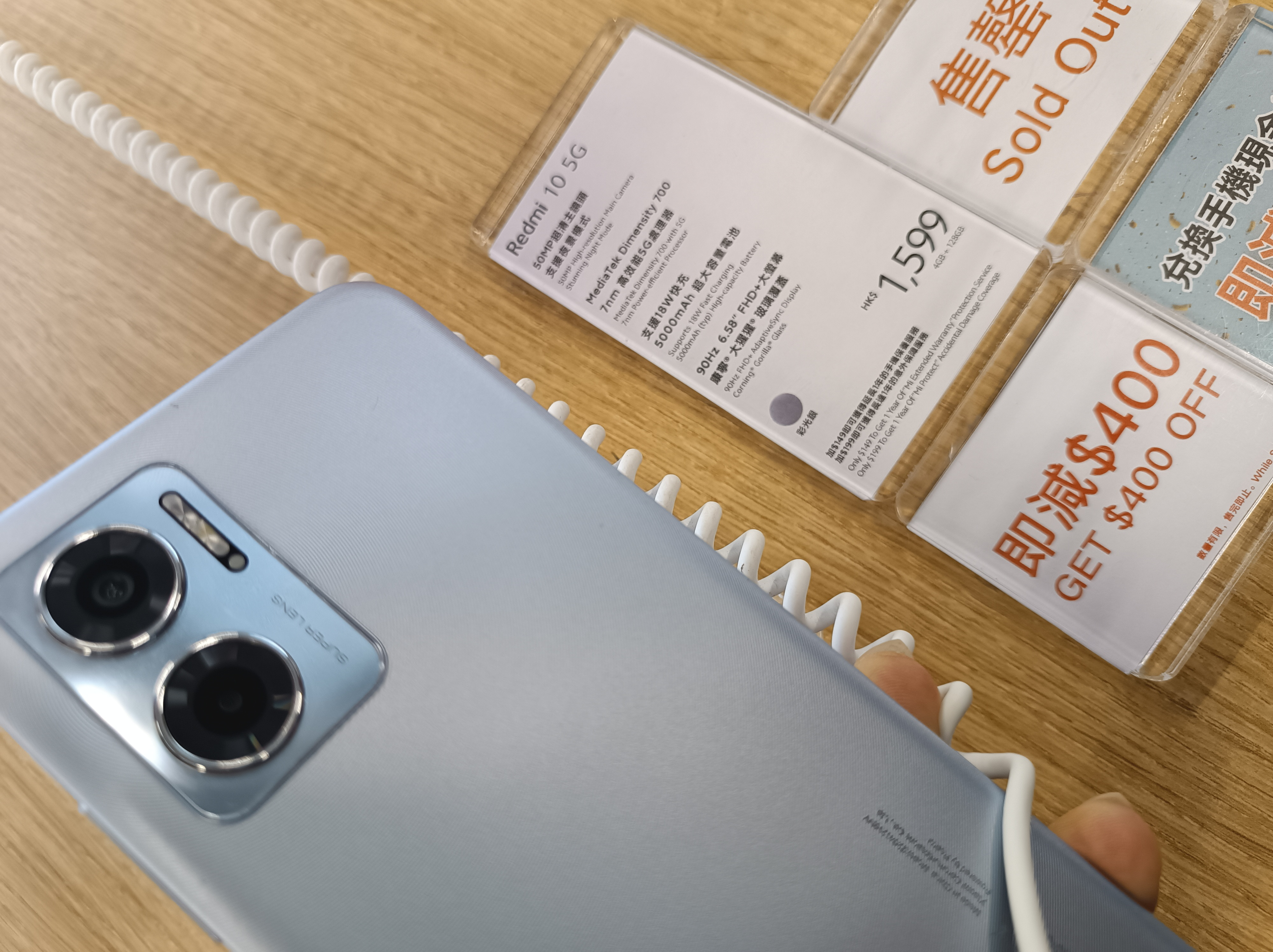
- The back of Redmi 10 5G in Chrome Silver
- Brand: Redmi/Poco
- Manufacturer: Xiaomi
- Type: Phablet
- Series: Redmi/Redmi Note; Poco M
- First released: Note 11E: March 2, 2022; 4 years ago 10 5G: March 29, 2022; 4 years ago Poco M4 5G: April 29, 2022; 4 years ago 11 Prime 5G: September 6, 2022; 3 years ago Note 11R: September 30, 2022; 3 years ago
- Availability by region: Note 11E: China March 18, 2022; Poco M4 5G: India May 5, 2022; Global August 2022; 10 5G: May 5, 2022; 11 Prime 5G: India September 9, 2022; Note 11R: China October 2022
- Predecessor: Redmi 9 Redmi 10 Prime; Poco M3
- Successor: Redmi 12 5G; Poco M5
- Related: Redmi 10; Redmi 10A; Redmi 10C; Redmi Note 10 5G; Redmi Note 11; Redmi 11 Prime
- Compatible networks: GSM / HSPA / LTE / 5G
- Form factor: Slate
- Colors: 10 5G: Graphite Gray, Chrome Silver, Aurora Green; Note 11E: Mysterious Darkness, Ice Crystal Galaxy, Microbrewed Mint; 11 Prime 5G: Thunder Black, Chrome Silver, Meadow Green; Poco M4 5G: Power Black, Cool Blue, Poco Yellow; Note 11R: Polar Blue Ocean, Mysterious Darkness, Ice Crystal Galaxy
- Dimensions: 164 mm (6.5 in) H 76.1 mm (3.00 in) W 8.9 mm (0.35 in) D
- Weight: 200 g (7.1 oz)
- Operating system: Original: 10 5G/11 Prime 5G/Note 11E/Note 11R: Android 12, MIUI 13; Poco M4 5G: Android 12, MIUI 13 for Poco; Current: Android 14, Xiaomi HyperOS
- System-on-chip: MediaTek MT6833 Dimensity 700 5G (7 nm)
- CPU: Octa-core (2x2.2 GHz Cortex-A76 & 6x2 GHz Cortex-A55)
- GPU: Mali-G57 MC2
- Memory: 10 5G/11 Prime 5G/Note 11E/Poco M4 5G: 4 GB, 6 GB; Note 11R: 4 GB, 6 GB, 8 GB; LPDDR4X RAM
- Storage: 10 5G/Poco M4 5G: 64 GB, 128 GB; Note 11E/Note 11R: 128 GB
- Removable storage: microSDXC; 10 5G/11 Prime 5G/Note 11E/Poco M4 5G (India): expandable up to 512 GB; Poco M4 5G/Note 11R: expandable up to 1 TB
- SIM: Dual nanoSIM
- Battery: Li-Po 5000 mAh
- Charging: Fast charging 18 W Power Delivery 3.0; Quick Charge 3+
- Rear camera: 10 5G/11 Prime 5G/Note 11E/Poco M4 5G (India): 50 MP, f/1.8, 26mm (wide), PDAF; 2 MP, f/2.4 (depth); Poco M4 5G/Note 11R: 13 MP, f/2.2 (wide), PDAF; 2 MP, f/2.4 (depth); Video: 1080p@30fps
- Front camera: 10 5G/Note 11E/Note 11R/Poco M4 5G: 5 MP, f/2.2 11 Prime 5G: 8 MP, f/2.2, (wide), 1.0 μm Poco M4 5G (India): 8 MP, f/2.4, (wide), 1.0 μm
- Display: IPS LCD, 6.58 in (167 mm), 104.3 cm2 (~83.6% screen-to-body ratio), 1080 x 2048 pixels, 20:9 ratio (~401 ppi density)
- Sound: Loudspeaker, 3.5mm jack
- Connectivity: USB Type-C 2.0; Wi-Fi 802.11 a/b/g/n/ac, dual-band, Wi-Fi Direct, hotspot Bluetooth 5.1, A2DP, LE; A-GPS, GLONASS, BDS, GALILEO (except Poco M4 5G)
- Data inputs: Sensors: Fingerprint scanner (side-mounted); Accelerometer; Gyroscope; Proximity sensor; Compass
- Water resistance: IP53, dust and splash protection
- Model: 10 5G: 22041219G; Note 11E: 22041219C; 11 Prime 5G: 22041219I; Poco M4 5G: MZB0BRZIN, 22041219PI; Note 11R: 22095RA98C
- Codename: 10 5G/11 Prime 5G/Note 11E/Poco M4 5G: light 10 5G/Poco M4 5G (NFC): thunder Note 11R: lightcm
- Website: www.mi.com/global/product/redmi-10-5g/; www.mi.com/redminote11e; www.poco.in/pocom4_5G

The Redmi 10 5G is a 5G Android-based smartphone developed by Redmi, a sub-brand of Xiaomi Inc, and was introduced March 29, 2022 alongside the Redmi Note 11S 5G and global version of Redmi Note 11 Pro+ 5G. Earlier in China, the Redmi 10 5G was released alongside Redmi Note 11E Pro as the Redmi Note 11E, and later it was released in India alongside the Redmi 11 Prime and Redmi A1 as the Redmi 11 Prime 5G with different front camera.

The Redmi 10 5G was launched under the Poco brand as the Poco M4 5G (stylized and marketed as the Poco M4 5G) with different designs and a primary camera. The Indian variant of the Poco M4 5G has more advanced cameras. In China, the global Poco M4 5G was sold as the Redmi Note 11R with an Ice Crystal Galaxy color option instead of Poco Yellow and a bigger memory configuration.

== Design ==
The front is made of Gorilla Glass 3, while the back is made of plastic with a wavy texture.

The design of the Redmi 10 5G/Note 11E and Redmi 11 Prime 5G back is similar to Oppo smartphones, when in the Poco M4 5G/Note 11R it is similar to the Pixel 6. Also, all models have IP53 dust and splash protection.

On the bottom of the smartphones, the user can find a USB-C port, a speaker, and a microphone. On the top side, there are an IR blaster and a 3.5mm audio jack. On the left side, there is a dual SIM tray with a microSD card slot. On the right side, there are the volume rocker and the power button with an integrated fingerprint scanner.

The phones were sold in the following color options:

Color	Redmi 10 5G	Redmi 11 Prime 5G	Redmi Note 11E	Color	Redmi Note 11R	Color	Poco M4 5G
Color	Name			Color	Name	Color	Name
	Graphite Gray	Thunder Black	Mysterious Darkness		Mysterious Darkness		Power Black
	Chrome Silver		Ice Crystal Galaxy		Polar Blue Ocean		Cool Blue
	Aurora Green	Meadow Green	Microbrewed Mint		Ice Crystal Galaxy		Poco Yellow

== Specifications ==
=== Hardware ===
==== Platform ====
The smartphones have, like Redmi Note 10 5G, the MediaTek Dimensity 700 with 5G support and the Mali-G57 MC2 GPU.

==== Battery ====
The devices feature a non-removable battery with 5000 mAh capacity and 18 W fast charging.

==== Camera ====
All models have dual rear camera with a 50 MP, f/1.8 wide camera on the Redmi 10 5G/Note 11E, Redmi 11 Prime 5G and Indian Poco M4 5G, and 13 MP f/2.2 wide camera on the global Poco M4 5G/Note 11R, and an additional 2 MP, f/2.4 depth sensor. The Redmi 10 5G/Note 11E and Poco M4 5G have a 5 MP, f/2.2 front camera, the Indian Poco M4 5G has an 8 MP, f/2.4 front camera and the Redmi 11 Prime 5G has an 8 MP, f/2.2 front camera. Both the rear and front camera can record video in 1080p@30fps.

==== Display ====
The phones feature a 6.58-inch display with IPS LCD technology at Full HD+ (2408 × 1080; ~401 ppi) image resolution, a 90 Hz refresh rate, and a waterdrop notch.

==== Memory ====
The Redmi 10 5G was sold in 4/64 GB, 4/128 GB and 6/128 GB memory configurations, the Redmi Note 11E ― 4/128 and 6/128 GB configurations, the Redmi 11 Prime 5G and Poco M4 5G ― 4/64 and 6/128 GB configurations, and the Redmi Note 11R ― 4/128, 6/128 and 8/128 GB configurations.

All models have LPDDR4X type RAM and UFS 2.2 type storage, which could be extended by microSD up to 1 TB in the global Poco M4 5G and Redmi Note 11R, and up to 512 GB in the other models.

=== Software ===
Initially, the Redmi 10 5G/Note 11E, Redmi 11 Prime 5G, and Redmi Note 11R were released with MIUI 13 custom skin, and the Poco M4 5G was released with MIUI 13 for Poco. Both interfaces are based on Android 12. Later all models were updated to Xiaomi HyperOS based on Android 14.

== See also ==
- Redmi 10
- Redmi Note 10
- Redmi Note 11

Preceded by Redmi 9T	Redmi 10 5G; 2022	Succeeded by Redmi 12 5G
Preceded by Redmi 10 Prime 2022	Redmi 11 Prime 5G; 2022	Succeeded by Redmi 12 5G
First	Redmi Note 11R; 2022	Succeeded by Redmi Note 12R
Preceded by Poco M3	Poco M4 5G; 2022	Succeeded by Poco M5
