= Redmi 10C =

2022 Android smartphone by Xiaomi

Redmi 10C Redmi 10 (India) Redmi 10 Power

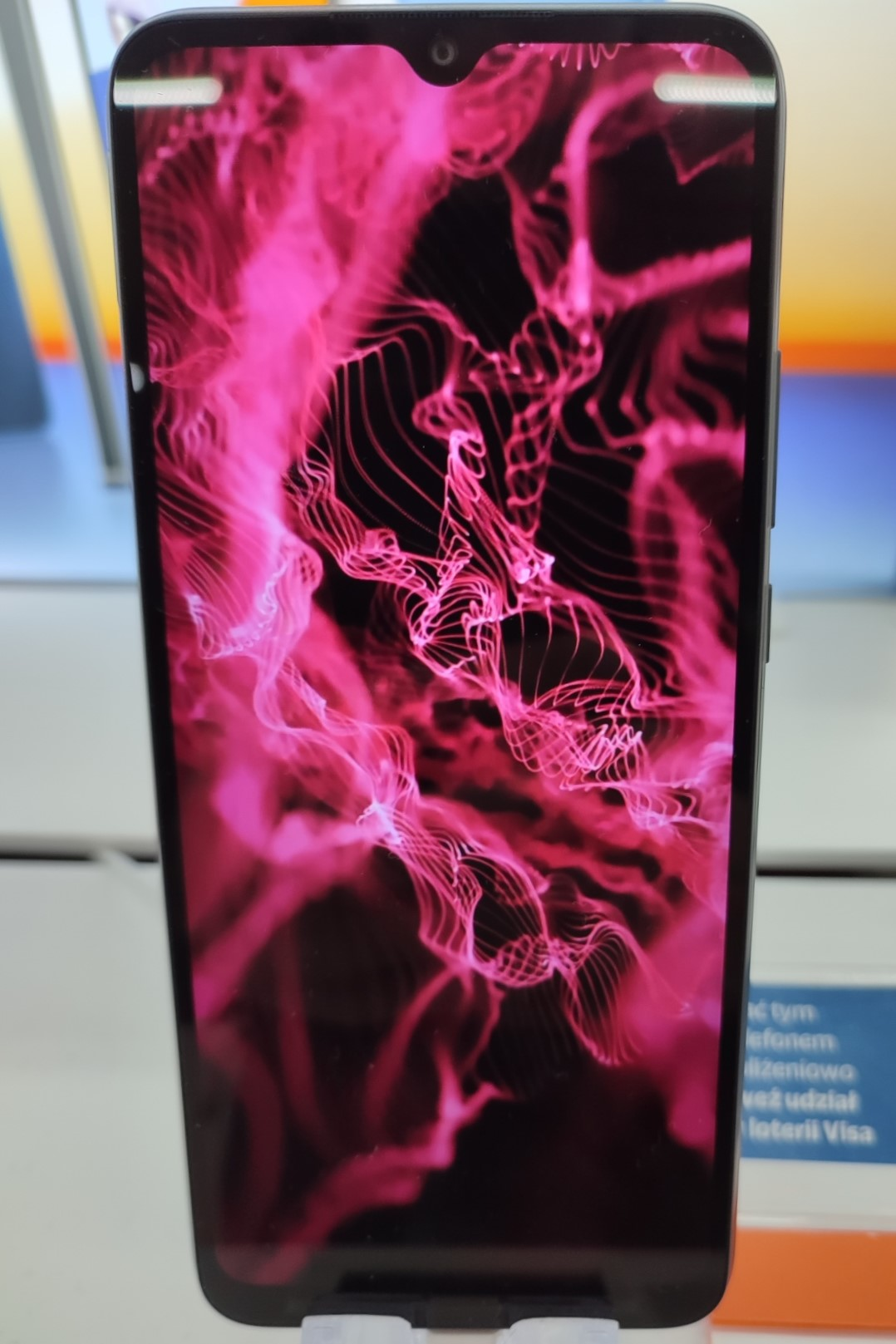
- The front of Redmi 10C
- Brand: Redmi
- Manufacturer: Xiaomi
- Type: Phablet
- Series: Redmi
- First released: 10: March 17, 2022; 4 years ago 10C: March 21, 2022; 4 years ago 10 Power: April 20, 2022; 4 years ago
- Availability by region: 10C: March 23, 2022; 10: India March 24, 2022; 10 Power: India April 30, 2022
- Predecessor: Redmi 9C; Redmi 9 Power
- Successor: Redmi 12C
- Related: Poco C40; Redmi 10; Redmi 10 5G; Redmi 10A
- Compatible networks: GSM / HSPA / LTE
- Form factor: Slate
- Colors: 10C: Graphite Gray; Ocean Blue; Mint Green; 10: Midnight Black; Pacific Blue; Caribbean Green; 10 Power: Power Black, Sporty Orange
- Dimensions: 169.6 mm (6.68 in) H 76.6 mm (3.02 in) W 10C: 8.3 mm (0.33 in) D 10/Power: 9.1 mm (0.36 in) D
- Weight: 10C: 190 g (6.7 oz); 10/Power: 203 g (7.2 oz)
- Operating system: Original: Android 11 with MIUI 13; Current: Android 13 with MIUI 14
- System-on-chip: Snapdragon 680 4G (6 nm)
- CPU: Octa-core (4x2.4 GHz Kryo 265 Gold & 4x1.9 GHz Kryo 265 Silver)
- GPU: Adreno 610 (1114 MHz)
- Memory: 10C: 3 or 4 GB RAM; 10: 4 or 6 GB RAM; 10 Power: 8 GB RAM
- Storage: 10C/10: 64 or 128 GB UFS 2.2; 10 Power: 128 GB UFS 2.2
- Removable storage: microSDXC
- SIM: Dual SIM (Nano-SIM, dual stand-by)
- Battery: Li-Po; 10C: 5000 mAh; 10/Power: 6000 mAh
- Charging: Fast charging 18W
- Rear camera: 50 MP, f/1.8, 26mm (wide), PDAF; 2 MP, f/2.4, (depth); LED flash, HDR, panorama 1080p@30fps
- Front camera: 5 MP, f/2.2 1080p@30fps
- Display: 6.71 in (170 mm); 720 x 1650 pixels (~268 ppi density); IPS LCD
- Sound: Loudspeaker
- Connectivity: Wi-Fi 802.11 a/b/g/n/ac, dual-band, Wi-Fi Direct, hotspot Bluetooth 5.0, A2DP, LEGPS; GPS, A-GPS, GLONASS, BDS, GALILEO
- Data inputs: Multi-touch screen; USB Type-C 2.0; Fingerprint scanner; Accelerometer; Proximity sensor
- Model: 10C: 220333QAG, 220333QNY, 220333QL; 10: 220333QBI; 10 Power: 220333QAI
- Codename: 10C/10/Power: fog 10C (NFC): rain 10C (Latin America): wind
- SAR: 0.96 W/kg (head); 1.02 W/kg (body)
- Website: www.mi.com/global/product/redmi-10c/ www.mi.com/in/product/redmi-10/ www.mi.com/in/product/redmi-10-power/

The Redmi 10C is an Android-based smartphone as part of the Redmi series, a sub-brand of Xiaomi Inc. The phone was announced on March 21, 2022, and is marketed as a lite version of Redmi 10 being at the same time better in some specifications.

In India, the Redmi 10C was introduced as the Redmi 10 (not to be confused with the global Redmi 10 which is sold in India as Redmi 10 Prime) with a bigger battery. It succeeds the Indian version of the Redmi 9 (Redmi 9C NFC without NFC chip), which was released in August 2020.

Also, exclusively for was released the Redmi 10 Power which has more memory capacity than the Indian Redmi 10 and a different back.

== Design ==
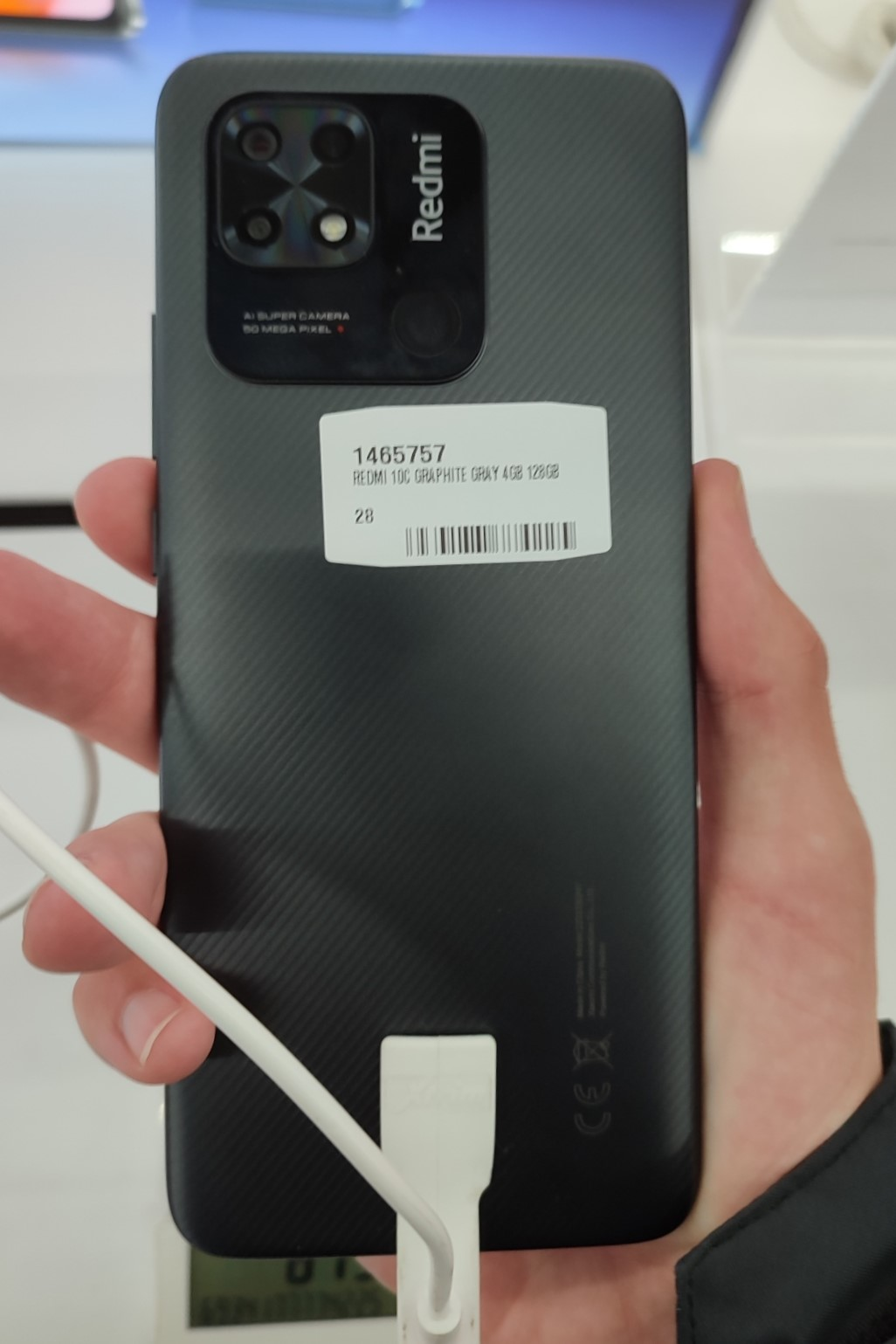
The back of Redmi 10C in Graphite Gray

The front of the smartphones is made of Gorilla Glass 3. The back is made of plastic with a wavy texture on the Redmi 10C and Indian Redmi 10 and with a leather-like texture on the Redmi 10 Power.

The design of smartphones is similar to the realme narzo 50A with a camera unit merged with a fingerprint sensor.

On the bottom of the smartphones, there is a USB-C port, a loudspeaker, and a microphone. On the top is a 3.5mm audio jack. On the left, there is a dual SIM tray with microSD slot. On the right, there is the volume rocker and the power button.

The phones were sold in the following color options:

Color	Redmi 10C	Redmi 10 (India)	Color	Redmi 10 Power
Color	Name		Color	Name
	Graphite Gray	Midnight Black		Power Black
	Ocean Blue	Pacific Blue		Sporty Orange
	Mint Green	Caribbean Green		

== Specifications ==
=== Hardware ===
==== Platform ====
The smartphones feature the Qualcomm Snapdragon 680 4G with the Adreno 610, like the Redmi Note 11.

==== Battery ====
The smartphones use non-removable batteries with a capacity of 5000 mAh in the Redmi 10C and with a capacity of 6000 mAh in the Indian Redmi 10 and Redmi 10 Power. All models have 18 W fast charging support but in-box charger has a power of 10 W.

==== Camera ====
The smartphones have a dual rear camera with a 50 MP, f/1.8 wide camera and a 2 MP, f/2.4 depth sensor, and a 5 MP, f/2.2 front camera. The rear and front cameras can record video in 1080p@30 fps.

==== Display ====
The phones feature a 6.71-inch IPS LCD with HD+ (1650 × 720; ~269 ppi) image resolution and a waterdrop notch.

==== Memory ====
The Redmi 10C was sold in 3/64, 4/64 or 4/128 GB configurations; the Indian Redmi 10 in 4/64 and 4/128 GB configurations; Redmi 10 Power in 8/128 GB configuration.

All models have LPDDR4X type RAM and UFS 2.2 type storage which could be extended by a microSD up to 1 TB.

=== Software ===
The smartphones were released with MIUI 13 custom skin based on Android 11 and later they were updated to MIUI 14 based on Android 13.
