= Redmi 10A =

2022 Android smartphone by Xiaomi

Redmi 10A/10A Sport
- Brand: Redmi
- Manufacturer: Xiaomi
- Type: Phablet
- Series: Redmi
- First released: 10A: March 29, 2022; 4 years ago 10A Sport: July 27, 2022; 3 years ago
- Availability by region: March 31, 2022
- Predecessor: Redmi 9A
- Successor: Redmi 12C
- Related: Redmi 10; Redmi 10C; Redmi 10 5G
- Form factor: Slate
- Dimensions: 164.9 mm (6.49 in) H 77 mm (3.0 in) W 9 mm (0.35 in) D
- Weight: 194 g (6.8 oz)
- Operating system: Android 11 with MIUI 12.5
- System-on-chip: MediaTek MT6762G Helio G25 (12 nm)
- CPU: Octa-core (4x2.0 GHz Cortex-A53 & 4x1.5 GHz Cortex-A53)
- GPU: PowerVR GE8320
- Memory: 10A: 2, 3, 4 or 6 GB RAM; 10A Sport: 6 GB RAM; LPDDR4X
- Storage: 10A: 32, 64 or 128 GB; 10A Sport: 128 GB eMMC 5.1
- Removable storage: microSDXC
- SIM: Dual SIM (Nano-SIM, dual stand-by)
- Battery: 5000mAh
- Charging: 10W
- Rear camera: Global 10A: 13 MP, f/2.2, (wide), 1.0 μm, AF + 2 MP, f/2.4 (depth); China and India 10A/Sport: 13 MP, f/2.2, (wide), 1.0 μm, AF; LED flash 1080p@30fps
- Front camera: 5 MP, f/2.2 1080p@30fps
- Display: 6.53 in (166 mm); 720 x 1600 pixels, 20:9 ratio (~269 ppi density)
- Sound: Loudspeaker
- Connectivity: Wi-Fi 802.11 a/b/g/n, Wi-Fi Direct, hotspot Bluetooth 5.0, A2DP, LE; GPS, A-GPS, GLONASS, BDS
- Data inputs: Multi-touch screen; microUSB 2.0; Accelerometer; Proximity sensor
- Model: 10A: 220233L2C, 220233L2G, 220233L2I; 10A Sport: 220233L2I
- Codename: dandelion
- Website: www.mi.com/global/product/redmi-10a

The Redmi 10A is a low-end Android-based smartphone as part of the Redmi series, a sub-brand of Xiaomi Inc. The phone was announced on March 29, 2022. Also, in India on July 27 Redmi announced the Redmi 10A Sport which was sold only in 6/128 GB memory configuration.

== Design ==
The front is made of glass and the back is made of textured plastic.

The Redmi 10A and 10A Sport use the same body as the Redmi 9C with a changed texture and a black area like on the Redmi 10C which merges the camera island and fingerprint sensor.

On the bottom of the smartphones, there is a microUSB port, loudspeaker, and microphone. On the top, there is only 3.5mm audio jack. On the left, is a Dual SIM tray with a place for microSD. On the right, side is the volume rocker and the power button.

The phones were available in the following color options:

Color	Redmi 10A	Redmi 10A (India)/10A Sport
Color	Name	
	Graphite Gray	Charcoal Black
	Chrome Silver	Slate Grey
	Sky Blue	Sea Blue

== Specifications ==
=== Hardware ===
The smartphones feature the same MediaTek Helio G25 SoC as their predecessors with the PowerVR GE8320 GPU. The Redmi 10A was available in 2/32 GB, 3/32 GB, 3/64 GB, 4/64 GB, 4/128 GB, and 6/128 GB memory configurations, while the Redmi 10A Sport was available only in 6/128 GB configuration.

Both models use a non-removable 5000 mAh battery and feature 10 W charging support.

The smartphones have a 13 MP, f/2.2 wide-angle lens with an autofocus. Additionally, the Redmi 10A for the global market (model number 220233L2G) features a 2 MP, f/2.4 depth sensor. The phones also feature a 5 MP, f/2.2 front camera. The rear and front cameras can record videos in 1080p @30 fps.

=== Software ===
The Redmi 10A and Redmi 10A Sport were released with MIUI 12.5 based on Android 11.
