= Redmi 9T =

Series of Android smartphones from Xiaomi

Redmi 9T (Redmi 9 Power in India) Redmi Note 9 4G Poco M3
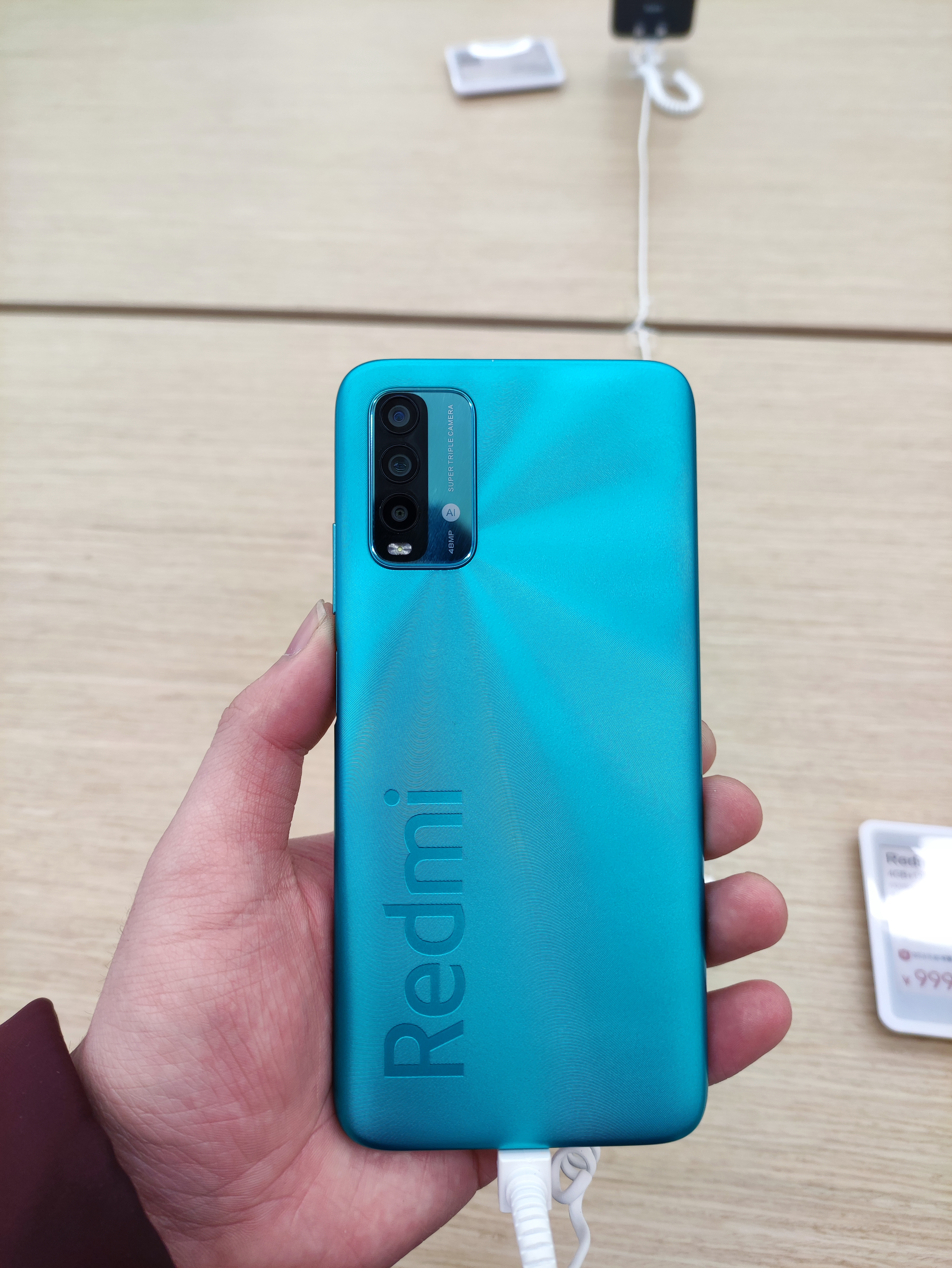
- Brand: Redmi
- Manufacturer: Xiaomi
- First released: Poco M3: 24 November 2020; 5 years ago Note 9 4G: 26 November 2020; 5 years ago 9 Power: 17 December 2020; 5 years ago 9T: 8 January 2021; 5 years ago
- Predecessor: Redmi Note 8 Poco M2
- Successor: Redmi 10 5G; Redmi Note 11 4G; Redmi 10 Power
- Related: Redmi 9 Redmi 9A; Redmi 9C; Redmi Note 9T; Redmi Note 9 Pro 5G; Poco M3 Pro
- Compatible networks: GSM / CDMA (Note 9 4G) / HSPA / LTE
- Colors: 9T: Carbon Gray, Twilight Blue, Sunrise Orange, Ocean Green; 9 Power: Mighty Black, Fiery Red, Electric Green, Blazing Blue; Note 9 4G: Gray, Green, Blue, Orange; Poco M3: Cool Blue, Poco Yellow, Power Black
- Dimensions: 162.3 x 77.3 x 9.6 mm (6.39 x 3.04 x 0.38 in)
- Weight: 198 g (6.98 oz)
- Operating system: 9T/9 Power/Note 9 4G: Initial: Android 10 + MIUI 12; Current: Android 12 + MIUI 14; Poco M3: Initial: Android 10 + MIUI 12 for POCO; Current: Android 12 + MIUI 14 for POCO
- CPU: Octa-core (4x2.0 GHz Kryo 260 Gold & 4x1.8 GHz Kryo 260 Silver)
- GPU: Adreno 610
- Storage: 9T/9 Power/Poco M3: 64GB/128GB storage, microSDXC; Note 9 4G: 128GB/256GB storage, microSDXC
- SIM: Nano-SIM + Nano-SIM
- Battery: Li-Po 6000 mAh
- Charging: 18W wired, 2.5W reverse wired
- Rear camera: Quad-Camera Setup; Redmi 9T / 9 Power / Note 9: Primary: Samsung ISOCELL (S5K)GM1st; 48 MP, f/1.79, 26mm (wide), 1/2.0", 0.8 µm, PDAF; Ultrawide: 8 MP, f/2.2, FoV 118° (Note 9), 120° (9T / 9 Power), 1/4.0", 1.12 µm, FF; Macro: Hynix Hi-259; 2 MP, f/2.4, 1/5.0", 1.75 µm, FF (9T / 9 Power), AF (Note 9); Depth: OmniVision OV02B1B; 2 MP, f/2.4, 1/5.0", 1.75 µm; Triple-Camera Setup; Poco M3: Primary: Samsung ISOCELL (S5K)GM1st; 48 MP, f/1.79, 26mm (wide), FoV 80.7°, 1/2.0", 0.8 µm, PDAF; Macro: Hynix Hi-259; 2 MP, f/2.4, 1/5.0", 1.75 µm, FF; Depth: OmniVision OV02B1B; 2 MP, f/2.4, 1/5.0", 1.75 µm; Camera features: LED flash, HDR, Panorama; Video recording: 1080p@30fps
- Front camera: 9T/9 Power/Note 9 8 MP, f/2.0 or 2.1, 27mm (wide), 1/4.0", 1.12μm Poco M3 8 MP, f/2.1, (wide), 1/4.0", 1.12μm

The Redmi 9T is an Android smartphone from Redmi. It was introduced on January 8, 2021, within the Redmi Note 9T. In India, the 9T was introduced on December 17, 2020, as the Redmi 9 Power. Also in China, on November 26, 2020, along with the Redmi Note 9 5G and Redmi Note 9 Pro 5G, the Redmi Note 9 4G was introduced, which is identical to the Redmi 9T and 9 Power except for the lack of a macro module.

Also, on November 24, 2020, the company Poco, whose global office had just separated from Xiaomi, introduced the Poco M3, which is similar to the Redmi 9T model but with a different design, the absence of NFC in all markets, and an ultrawide-angle module.

== Design ==
The front is made of Corning Gorilla Glass 3, while the body is made of plastic with a "wavy" texture on the Redmi 9T/9 Power and Redmi Note 9 4G and a leather-like texture on the Poco M3.

The only design difference between the Redmi 9T/9 Power and the Redmi Note 9 4G is that the Redmi Note 9 4G has the inscription "AI" instead of the fourth camera lens. The Poco M3 features a black glossy rectangle with the brand logo, which is placed on the upper part of the back.

At the bottom is a USB-C port, a speaker, a microphone, and a 3.5mm audio jack. At the top, there's a second microphone and an IR blaster. On the left side, you'll find a slot for two SIM cards and a microSD memory card of up to 512GB. On the right side, there are volume control buttons and the smartphone's power button, which also has a built-in fingerprint scanner.

There are several color options, depending on the model:

- 9T: Carbon Gray, Twilight Blue, Sunrise Orange, Ocean Green
- 9 Power (India): Mighty Black, Fiery Red, Electric Green, Blazing Blue
- Note 9 4G: Gray, Green, Blue, Orange
- Poco M3: Cool Blue, Poco Yellow, Power Black

== Technical specifications ==
=== Processor ===
All smartphones are equipped with the Qualcomm Snapdragon 662 SoC and the Adreno 610 GPU.

=== Battery ===
The battery has a capacity of 6000mAh, supports 18W fast charging, and 2.5W reverse wired charging. Additionally, a 22.5W charging block is included in the box.

=== Camera ===
The Redmi 9T and 9 Power feature a quad-camera setup with a 48MP wide-angle lens with phase detection autofocus and f/1.8 aperture, an 8MP ultrawide-angle lens with f/2.2 aperture, and 2MP macro lens and depth sensor with f/2.4. The Redmi Note 9 4G has the same cameras but lacks the macro lens, while the Poco M3 doesn't have an ultrawide-angle lens. All models feature a wide-angle 8MP front-facing camera with an f/2.05 aperture.

Both the main and front cameras can record video at up to a 1080p resolution at 30 frames per second.

==== Main camera modes ====
- Document
- Night Mode
- AI Scene Detection
- Google Lens
- AI Beautify
- Portrait Mode
- Cinematic Video
- Portrait Mode Background Blur
- Panorama
- RAW Mode

==== Front camera modes ====
- Selfie Timer
- Cinematic Video
- AI Beautify
- Built-in Filters
- Palm Shutter
- AI Portrait Mode
- Panorama Selfie

=== Display ===
The smartphones feature a 6.53-inch IPS LCD display with a Full HD+ (2340 x 1080 pixels) resolution, a 19.5:9 aspect ratio, and a waterdrop notch for the front camera.

=== Sound ===
Smartphones have received stereo speakers, located on the top and bottom of the smartphones.

=== Storage ===
The smartphones were sold in the following memory configurations:

Configuration		Smartphone model			
ROM	RAM	Redmi 9T	Redmi 9 Power	Redmi Note 9 4G	Poco M3
64 GB	4 GB	Yes	Yes	No	Yes
64 GB	6 GB	No	No	No	Yes
128 GB	4 GB	Yes	Yes	Yes	Yes
128 GB	6 GB	Yes	No	Yes	Yes
128 GB	8 GB	No	No	Yes	No
256 GB	8 GB	No	No	Yes	No

=== Software ===
The Redmi 9T, 9 Power, and Note 9 4G were initially launched with MIUI 12, while the POCO M3 came with MIUI 12 for POCO. Both interfaces were based on Android 10. Subsequently, the Redmi 9T, 9 Power, and Note 9 4G were updated to MIUI 14, and the POCO M3 received MIUI 14 for POCO. These updated interfaces are based on Android 12.
