= Redmi 8 =

Android smartphone made by Xiaomi

Redmi 8 Redmi 8A Redmi 8A Dual/8A Pro
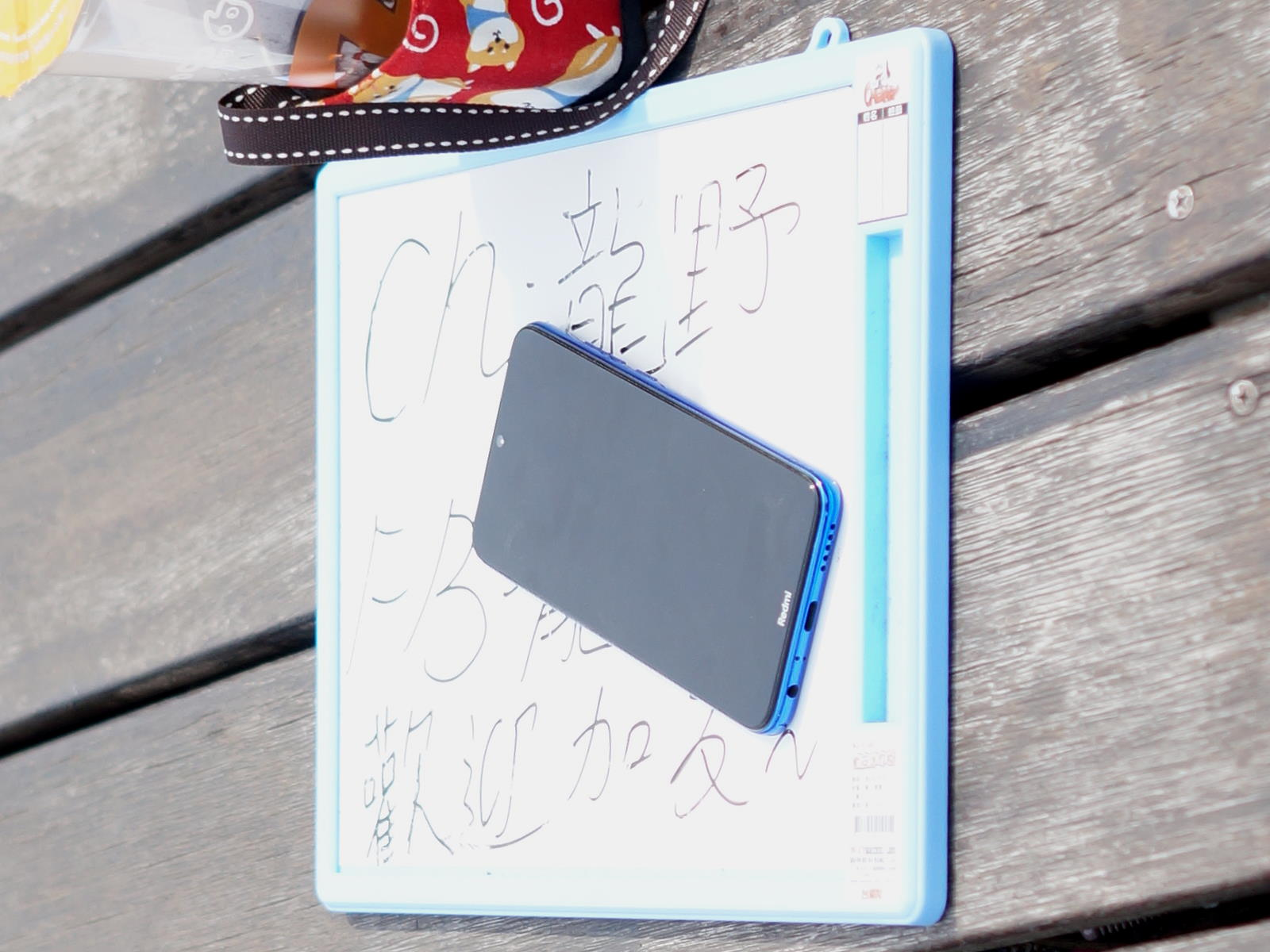
- Redmi 8 in Sapphire Blue
- Brand: Redmi
- Manufacturer: Xiaomi
- Type: Smartphone
- Series: Redmi
- First released: 8: September 25, 2019; 7 years ago 8A: October 12, 2019; 7 years ago 8A Dual: February 11, 2020; 6 years ago 8A Pro: April 2, 2020; 6 years ago
- Predecessor: Redmi 7 Redmi 7A
- Successor: Redmi 9 Redmi 9A; Redmi 9C
- Related: Redmi Note 8
- Compatible networks: GSM / HSPA / LTE
- Form factor: Slate
- Colors: 8: Onyx Black, Ruby Red, Sapphire Blue, Phantom Red; 8A: Midnight Black, Ocean Blue, Sunset Red; 8A Dual/8A Pro: Midnight Black, Sea Blue, Sky White
- Dimensions: 156.5 mm (6.16 in) H 75.4 mm (2.97 in) W 9.4 mm (0.37 in) D
- Weight: 188 g (6.6 oz)
- Operating system: Original: 8/8A: Android 9 Pie with MIUI 10.3; 8A Dual/8A Pro: Android 9 Pie with MIUI 11; Current: Android 10 with MIUI 12.5
- System-on-chip: Qualcomm Snapdragon 439 (12 nm)
- CPU: Octa-core (4x1.95 GHz Cortex-A53 & 4x1.45 GHz Cortex A53)
- GPU: Adreno 505
- Memory: 8: 3 and 4 GB; 8A: 2, 3 and 4 GB; 8A Dual/8A Pro: 2 and 3 GB; LPDDR3
- Storage: 8/8A Dual: 32 and 64 GB; 8: 16, 32 and 64 GB; 8A Pro: 32 GB eMMC 5.1
- Removable storage: microSDXC up to 256 GB
- SIM: Dual SIM (Nano-SIM, dual stand-by)
- Battery: Li-Po 5000 mAh
- Charging: Fast charging 18W
- Rear camera: 8: 12 MP, f/1.8, 1/2.55", 1.4 μm, Dual Pixel PDAF; 2 MP, (depth); 8A: 12 MP, f/1.8, 1/2.55", 1.4 μm, Dual Pixel PDAF; 8A Dual/8A Pro: 13 MP, f/2.2, 1/3.1", 1.12 μm, PDAF; 2 MP, f/2.4 (depth); All models: LED flash, HDR, panorama; 1080p@30fps
- Front camera: 8 MP, f/2.0, 1/4", 1.12 μm; 1080p@30fps
- Display: 6.22 in (158 mm); 720 x 1520 px resolution, 19:9 ratio (~270 ppi density); IPS LCD, 400 nits (typ); Corning Gorilla Glass 5
- Sound: Speakers
- Connectivity: Wi-Fi 802.11 b/g/n, Wi-Fi Direct; Bluetooth 4.2, A2DP, LE
- Data inputs: Multi-touch screen; USB Type-C 2.0; Fingerprint scanner (rear-mounted); Accelerometer; Proximity sensor; Compass
- Water resistance: Water-repellent coating
- Model: 8: M1908C3IC, M1908C3IE, M1908C3IG, M1908C3IH, M1908C3II, MZB8255IN; 8A: M1908C3KE, M1908C3KG, M1908C3KH, M1908C3KI, MZB8458IN; 8A Dual/Pro: M2003C3K3I
- Codename: 8: olive 8A: olivelite 8A Dual/8A Pro: olivewood
- SAR: 8: 0.34 W/kg (head); 1.00 W/kg (body); 8A: 0.48 W/kg (head); 1.07 W/kg (body)

The Redmi 8 is a line of Android-based smartphones as part of the Redmi series, a sub-brand of Xiaomi Inc. The main model Redmi 8 was announced on October 9, 2019, and released on October 12, 2019. On October 12, 2019 the Redmi 8A was announced and marketed as a lite model of Redmi 8. In India, on February 11, 2020, the Redmi 8A Dual was announced, which has a different camera setup compared to the Redmi 8A. On April 2, 2020 the Redmi 8A Dual was announced in Indonesia as the Redmi 8A Pro.

== Design ==
The front is made of Gorilla Glass 5 while the back is made of plastic.

On the bottom of smartphones, the user can find USB-C port, speaker, microphone and 3.5mm audio jack. On the top, there is an additional microphone and IR blaster. On the left, there is a dual SIM tray with microSD slot. On the right, are the volume rocker and the power button. Also, Redmi 8 has a fingerprint scanner on the back under the camera island.
