= Redmi 9A =

Series of smartphone models by Redmi

Redmi 9A Redmi 9AT Redmi 9A Sport Redmi 9i Redmi 9i Sport
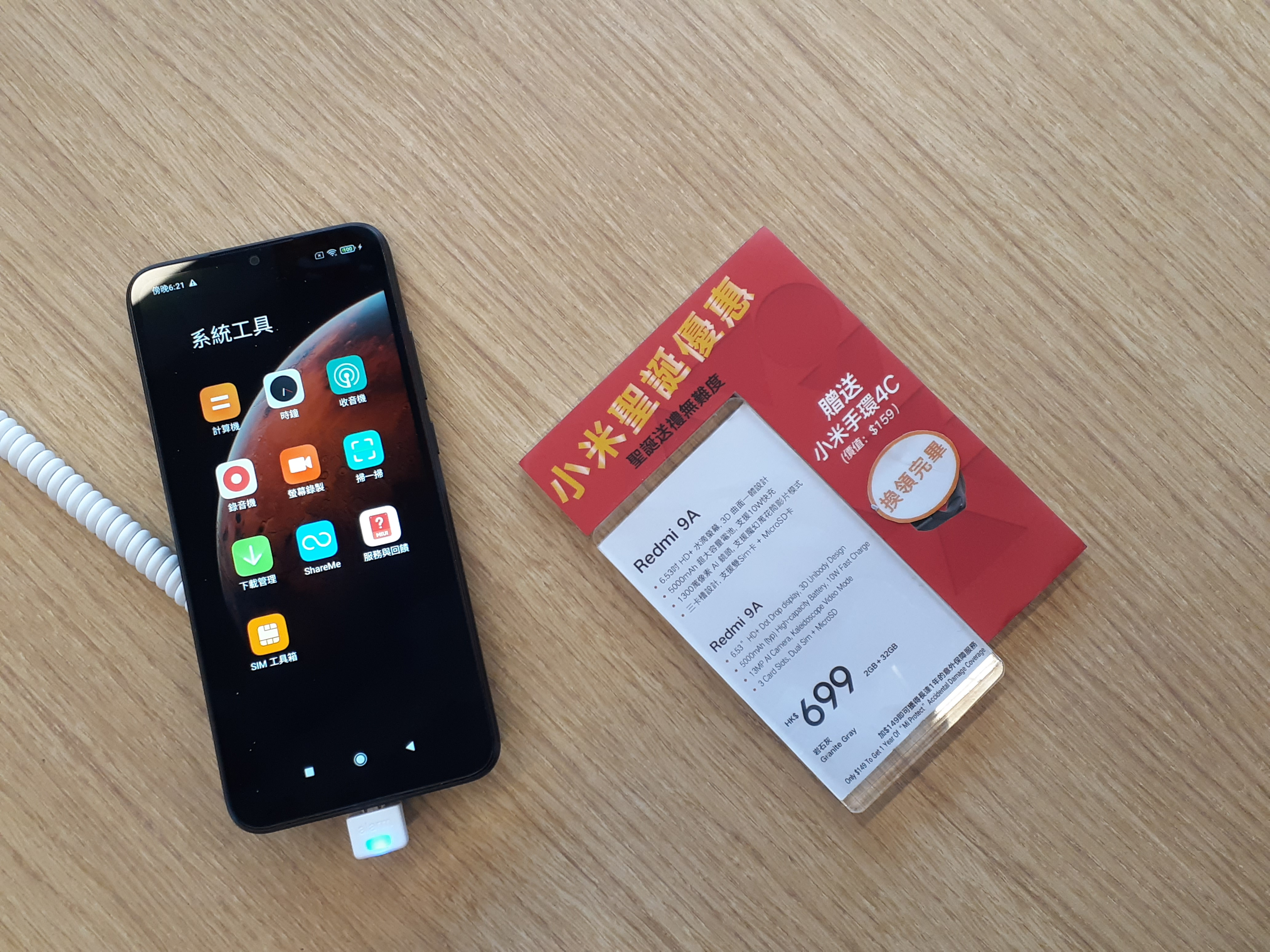
- Manufacturer: Redmi
- Type: Smartphone
- Series: Redmi
- First released: 9A: July 7, 2020; 9AT: September 9, 2020; 9A Sport: September 15, 2020; 9i/9i Sport: September 28, 2021
- Availability by region: 9A: Worldwide; 9AT: Spain; 9A Sport/9i/9i Sport: India
- Predecessor: Redmi 8A
- Successor: Redmi 10A
- Related: Redmi 9 Redmi 9C; Redmi 9T
- Colors: 9A/9AT: Carbon Gray (Midnight Black), Sky Blue (Sea Blue), Ocean Green (Nature Green); 9A Sport: 'Carbon Black, Coral Green, Metallic Blue; 9i: Black, Blue; 9i Sport: Carbon Black, Coral Green, Metallic Blue
- Dimensions: 164.9×77.1×9 mm (6.49×3.04×0.35 in)
- Weight: 194 g (7 oz)
- Operating system: Initial: Android 10 + MIUI 12; Current: 9A/Sport/9AT/9i/Sport: Android 10 + MIUI 12; 9A (China and Russia): Android 11 + MIUI 12.5
- CPU: 8 cores (4×2.0 GHz Cortex-A53 + 4×1.8 GHz Cortex-A53)
- GPU: PowerVR GE8320 (650 MHz)
- Memory: 9A: 2/3/4 GB; 9AT: 2GB; 9A Sport: 2/3 GB; 9i/9i Sport: 4 GB
- Storage: 9A: 32/64/128 GB; 9AT/9A Sport: 32 GB; 9i/9i Sport: 64/128 GB eMMC 5.1
- Removable storage: microSDXC up to 512 GB
- SIM: Dual SIM (Nano-SIM)
- Battery: Li-Po 5000 mAh (All smartphones)
- Charging: 10W wired charging
- Rear camera: 13 MP, f/2.2, 28 mm ( wide ), 1.0 μm, PDAF with LED flash, HDR Video: 1080p @30/60fps
- Front camera: 5 MP, f/2.2 (wide angle), 1.12 μm HDR Video: 1080p @30fps
- Display: 6.53-inch IPS LCD, 720 x 1600 pixels resolution

The Redmi 9A is a series of Android-based smartphones developed and manufactured by Xiaomi's sub-brand Redmi. It was unveiled on June 30, 2020, alongside the Redmi 9C, and was released on July 7, 2020.

On September 9, the Redmi 9AT was announced in Spain, which differs from the standard model by the addition of a second microphone for improved noise cancellation. Additionally, on September 15, 2020, the Redmi 9i was introduced in India as a version of the Redmi 9A with increased memory. Further, on September 28, 2021, the Redmi 9A Sport and Redmi 9i Sport were launched in India, primarily distinguished from the regular models by their new color options.

== Specifications ==
=== Design ===
The screen is made of glass and the smartphone's body is made of plastic.

On the bottom, there is a microUSB port, a speaker, and a microphone. On the top, there is a 3.5mm audio jack, and a second microphone in the Redmi 9AT. On the left side, there is a slot for 2 SIM cards and a microSD memory card. Under the main camera and flash, there is a line with the Redmi logo.

The phone is available with multiple colors, depending on the variant:

- The Redmi 9A and 9AT (in Spain) and was sold in 3 colors: Carbon Gray (Midnight Black), Sky Blue (Sea Blue), Ocean Green and (Nature Green).
- In India, the Redmi 9i was sold in 3 colors: Midnight Black, Sea Blue, and Nature Green.
- In India, the Redmi 9A Sport and 9i Sport were sold in 3 colors: Carbon Black (black), Metallic Blue (silver-blue), and Coral Green (green-blue).

=== Processor and GPU ===
All models (9A, 9AT, 9A Sport, 9i Sport) except the Redmi 9i featured with a MediaTek Helio G25 processor and a PowerVR GE8320 graphics processor.

The Redmi 9i featured with an Octa-core 4x2.0 GHz Cortex-A53 & 4x1.5 GHz Cortex-A53 processor.

=== Battery ===
The battery has a capacity of 5000 mAh.

=== Camera ===
The smartphones received a 13 MP main camera with f/2.2 aperture, phase-detection autofocus, and the ability to record video in 1080p@60fps resolution. The front camera received a 5 MP resolution, f/2.2 aperture, and the ability to record video in 1080p@30fps resolution.

=== Display ===
All phone has as IPS LCD screen, sizing about 6.53 inches, an HD+ resolution (1600 x 720 pixels) with a 20:9 aspect ratio with 269 pixels per inch, and a waterdrop notch for the front camera.

=== Storage ===
The phone's storages has a 32, 64, or 128 GB configuration with a 2/3/4 GB RAM, depending on the variant:

- The Redmi 9A was sold in configurations of 2/32GB, 3/32GB, 4/64GB, 4/128GB, and 6/128GB. In Ukraine, the smartphone was only available in the 2/32GB configuration.
- The Redmi 9AT was sold in the 2/32GB configuration.
- The Redmi 9A Sport was sold in configurations of 2/32GB and 3/32GB.
- The Redmi 9i and 9i Sport were sold in configurations of 4/64GB and 4/128GB.

=== Software ===
Smartphones were released with MIUI 12 based on Android 10. Later, Chinese and Russian versions of the Redmi 9A with MIUI were updated to MIUI 12.5 based on Android 11.

== See also ==
- Redmi 9C
- Redmi 9T
- Redmi Note 9
