= Redmi Note 11 =

2022 Android-based smartphones made by Xiaomi

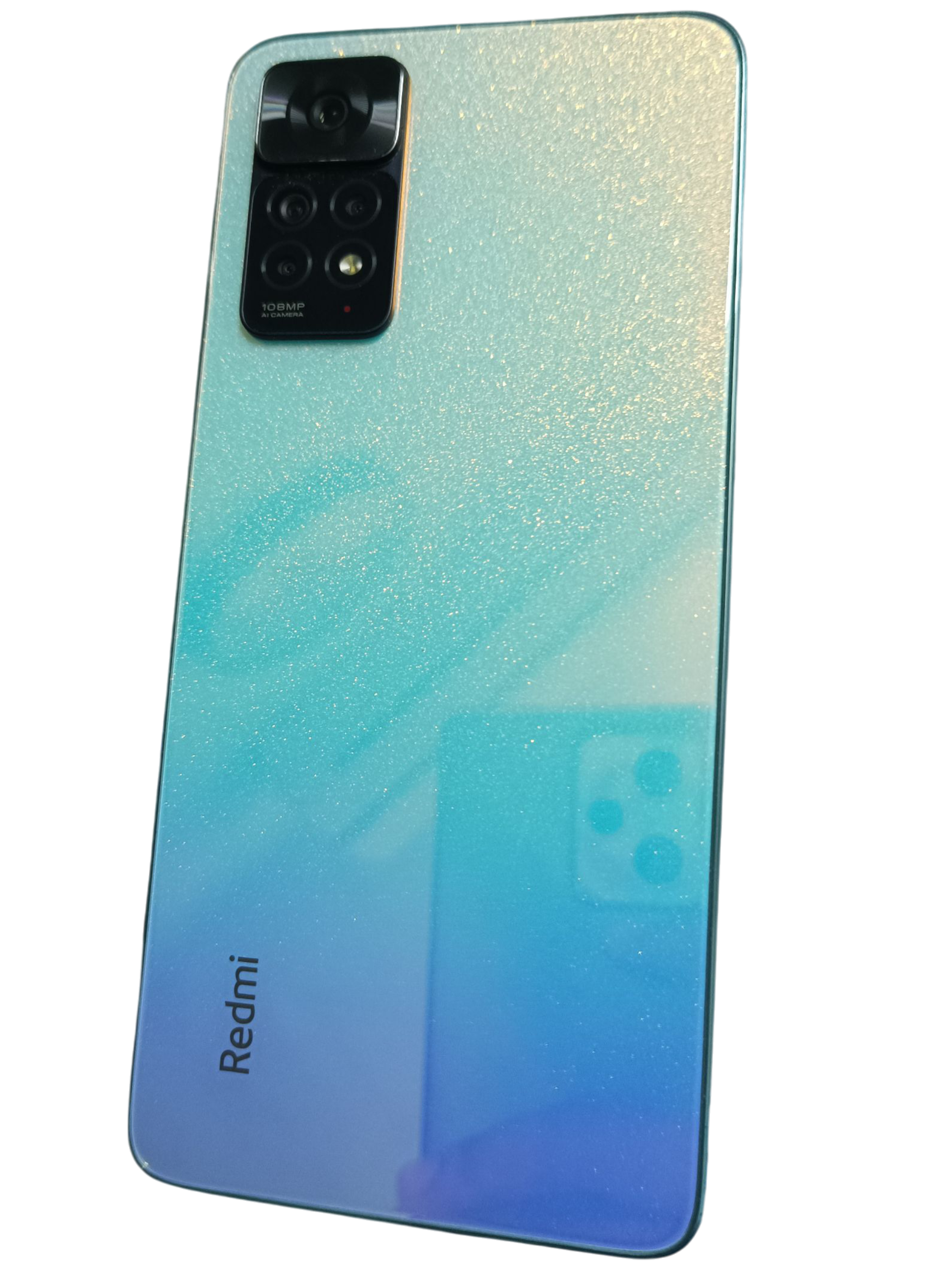
- Redmi Note 11 Pro in Star Blue colour variant
- Brand: Redmi/Poco/Xiaomi
- Manufacturer: Xiaomi
- Type: Smartphone
- Series: Redmi Note; Poco M/X; Xiaomi
- First released: Note 11/11S/Pro/Pro 5G: January 26, 2022; 4 years ago 11E Pro: March 2, 2022; 4 years ago Poco X4 Pro 5G/M4 Pro: February 28, 2022; 4 years ago 11 Pro+ (India): March 9, 2022; 4 years ago Note 11S 5G: March 29, 2022; 4 years ago
- Availability by region: February 9, 2022
- Predecessor: Redmi Note 10; Poco M3 Pro; Poco X3 Pro; Xiaomi Mi 10i
- Successor: Redmi Note 12; Poco M6 Pro; Poco M6 Pro 5G
- Related: Redmi Note 11 4G; Redmi Note 11E; Redmi Note 11SE; Redmi Note 11 SE
- Compatible networks: Note 11/11S/Pro/Poco M4 Pro: GSM / HSPA / LTE; Note 11 5G/11S 5G/Pro 5G/Pro (China)/Pro+/Poco M4 Pro 5G/X4 Pro 5G: GSM / HSPA / LTE / 5G
- Form factor: Slate
- Dimensions: Note 11/11S/Poco M4 Pro: 159.9 mm (6.30 in) H 73.9 mm (2.91 in) W 8.1 mm (0.32 in) D; Note 11 5G/11S 5G/Poco M4 Pro 5G: 163.6 mm (6.44 in) H 75.8 mm (2.98 in) W 8.8 mm (0.35 in) D; Note 11 Pro/Pro 5G/11E Pro/Pro+ (India)/Poco X4 Pro 5G: 164.2 mm (6.46 in) H 76.1 mm (3.00 in) W 8.1 mm (0.32 in) D; Note 11 Pro (China)/Pro+/Xiaomi 11i/HyperCharge: 163.7 mm (6.44 in) H 76.2 mm (3.00 in) W 8.3 mm (0.33 in) D
- Weight: Note 11/11S: 179 g (6.3 oz); Note 11 5G/11S 5G/Poco M4 Pro 5G: 195 g (6.9 oz); Note 11 Pro/Pro 5G/11E Pro/Pro+ (India): 202 g (7.1 oz); Note 11 Pro (China)/Xiaomi 11i: 207 g (7.3 oz); Note 11 Pro+/Xiaomi 11i HyperCharge: 204 g (7.2 oz); Poco X4 Pro 5G: 205 g (7.2 oz); Poco M4 Pro: 179.5 g (6.33 oz)
- Operating system: Original: Note 11 5G/Pro (China)/Pro+/Xiaomi 11i/HyperCharge: Android 11 MIUI 12.5; Note 11/11S/11S 5G/Pro/Pro 5G/11E Pro/Pro+ (India): Android 11, MIUI 13; Poco X4 Pro 5G/M4 Pro: Android 11, MIUI 13 for Poco; Poco M4 Pro 5G: Android 11, MIUI 12.5 for Poco; Current: Android 13, Xiaomi HyperOS
- System-on-chip: Note 11: Qualcomm Snapdragon 680 4G (6 nm); Note 11S/Pro/Poco M4 Pro: MediaTek Helio G96 (12 nm); 11 Pro 5G/11E Pro/Pro+ (India)/Poco X4 Pro 5G: Qualcomm Snapdragon 695 5G (6 nm); 11 5G/11S 5G/Poco M4 Pro 5G: MediaTek Dimensity 810 (6 nm); 11 Pro (China)/Pro+/Xiaomi 11i/HyperCharge: MediaTek Dimensity 920 5G (6 nm)
- CPU: Note 11: Octa-core (4x2.4 GHz Kryo 265 Gold & 4x1.9 GHz Kryo 265 Silver); Note 11S/Pro/Poco M4 Pro: Octa-core (2x2.05 GHz Cortex-A76 & 6x2.0 GHz Cortex-A55); Note 11 5G/11S 5G/Poco M4 Pro 5G: Octa-core (2x2.4 GHz Cortex-A76 & 6x2.0 GHz Cortex-A55); Note 11 Pro 5G/11E Pro/Pro+ (India)/Poco X4 Pro 5G: Octa-core (2x2.2 GHz Kryo 660 Gold & 6x1.7 GHz Kryo 660 Silver); Note 11 Pro (China)/Pro+/Xiaomi 11i/HyperCharge: Octa-core (2x2.5 GHz Cortex-A78 & 6x2.0 GHz Cortex-A55)
- GPU: Note 11: Adreno 610; Note 11 5G/11S/11S 5G/Pro/Poco M4 Pro/Pro 5G: Mali-G57 MC2; Note 11 Pro 5G/11E Pro/Pro+ (India)/Poco X4 Pro 5G: Adreno 619; Note 11 Pro (China)/Pro+/Xiaomi 11i/HyperCharge: Mali-G68 MC4
- Memory: Note 11: 4 or 6 GB; Note 11S/11E Pro/Pro (China)/Pro+/Xiaomi 11i/HyperCharge/Poco X4 Pro 5G/M4 Pro: 6 or 8 GB; Note 11S 5G/Pro/Pro 5G/Poco M4 Pro 5G: 4, 6 or 8 GB; LPDDR4X
- Storage: Note 11/11S/11T/11S 5G/Pro: 64 or 128 GB; Note 11 5G/Pro (China)/Pro+/Xiaomi 11i/HyperCharge: 128 or 256 GB; Note 11 Pro 5G/Pro+ (India)/11E Pro/Poco M4 Pro/Pro 5G/X4 Pro 5G: 64, 128 or 256 GB
- Removable storage: Note 11/11S/11S 5G/Pro/Pro 5G/Pro+/Xiaomi 11i/HyperCharge/Poco X4 Pro 5G/M4 Pro/Pro 5G: microSDXC, expandable up to 1 TB; Note 11 5G/11T/Pro (China)/Pro+ (China): none
- SIM: Note 11/11S/5G/11T/Pro (China)/Pro+ (China)/Poco M4 Pro/Pro 5G: Dual SIM (Nano-SIM); Note 11S 5G/Pro/Pro 5G/Pro+/Xiaomi 11i/HyperCharge/Poco M4 Pro 5G/X4 Pro 5G: Hybrid Dual SIM (Nano-SIM)
- Battery: Note 11/11S/5G/11S 5G/Pro/Pro 5G/11E Pro/Pro+ (India)/Poco X4 Pro 5G/M4 Pro/Pro 5G: Li-Po 5000 mAh; Note 11 Pro (China)/Xiaomi 11i: Li-Po 5160 mAh; Note 11 Pro+/Xiaomi 11i HyperCharge: Li-Po 4500 mAh
- Charging: Note 11/11S/5G/11S 5G/Poco M4 Pro/M4 Pro 5G: Fast charging 33W; Note 11 Pro/Pro 5G/11E Pro/Pro+ (India)/Pro (China)/Xiaomi 11i/Poco X4 Pro 5G: Fast charging 67W; Note 11 Pro+/Xiaomi 11i HyperCharge: Fast charging 120W; All models: Power Delivery 3.0; Quick Charge 3+
- Rear camera: Wide: Note 11/11 5G/11T/11S 5G/Poco M4 Pro 5G: 50 MP Samsung ISOCELL JN1, f/1.8, 26 mm, PDAF; Note 11S/Pro/Pro 5G/11E Pro/11 Pro+/Poco X4 Pro 5G: 108 MP Samsung ISOCELL HM2, f/1.9, 26 mm, 1/1.52", 0.7 μm, PDAF; Poco M4 Pro/X4 Pro 5G (India): 64 MP, f/1.8, 26 mm, 0.7 μm, PDAF; Ultrawide: All models: 8 MP, f/2.2; Note 11/11S/Pro/Pro 5G/11E Pro/Pro+ (India)/Poco M4 Pro/X4 Pro 5G: 118˚; Note 11 5G/11T/11S 5G/Poco M4 Pro 5G: 119˚; Note 11 Pro (China)/Pro+: 120˚; Macro: Note 11/11S/Pro/Pro 5G/11E Pro/Pro+/Poco M4 Pro/X4 Pro 5G: 2 MP GalaxyCore GC02M1XA, f/2.4, 1/5", 1.15 μm; Note 11 5G/11T/11S 5G/Poco M4 Pro 5G: no; Depth: Note 11/11S/Pro: 2 MP, f/2.4, 1/5", 1.75 μm; 11 5G/11T/11S 5G/Pro 5G/11E Pro/Pro+/Pro (China)/Poco M4 Pro/Pro 5G/X4 Pro 5G: no; Video: Note 11/11S/Pro/Pro 5G/11E Pro/Pro+ (India)/Poco M4 Pro/X4 Pro 5G: 1080p@30fps; Note 11 5G/11T/11S 5G/Poco M4 Pro 5G: 1080p@30/60fps; Note 11 Pro (China)/Pro+: 4K@30fps, 1080p@30/60fps; Other: LED flash, HDR, panorama
- Front camera: 11/11S 5G: 13 MP, f/2.4, wide 11S/Poco M4 Pro/11 Pro/11 Pro 5G/11E Pro/11 5G/11 Pro (China)/11 Pro+/11 Pro+ (India)/Poco M4 Pro 5G/X4 Pro 5G/Xiaomi 11i/11i HyperCharge: 16MP f/2.4, wide
- Display: Note 11/11S: 6.43 in (163 mm), 99.8 cm2 (~84.5% screen-to-body ratio); Note 11 5G/11T/11S 5G/Poco M4 Pro 5G: 6.6 in (170 mm), 105.5 cm2 (~84.8% screen-to-body ratio); Note 11 Pro/Pro 5G/11E Pro/Pro+/Xiaomi 11i/HyperCharge/Poco X4 Pro 5G: 6.67 in (169 mm), 107.4 cm2 (~86.0% screen-to-body ratio); All: 1080 x 2400 pixels, 20:9 ratio (~409 ppi density)
- Sound: Loudspeaker, 3.5mm jack
- Connectivity: Wi-Fi 802.11 a/b/g/n/ac, dual-band, Wi-Fi Direct, hotspot Bluetooth 5.0, A2DP, LE; A-GPS, GLONASS, BDS, GALILEO
- Data inputs: USB Type-C 2.0; Sensors: Fingerprint scanner (side-mounted); Accelerometer; Gyroscope; Proximity sensor; Compass
- Water resistance: IP53, dust and splash protection
- Codename: Note 11: spes; Note 11 NFC: spesn; Note 11 5G/11T: evergo; Poco M4 Pro 5G: evergreen; Note 11S/Poco M4 Pro: miel; Note 11S/Poco M4 Pro (NFC): fleur; Note 11S 5G: opal; Note 11 Pro: viva; Note 11 Pro (India): vida; Note 11 Pro 5G/11E Pro: veux; Note 11 Pro+ (India): peux; Poco X4 Pro 5G: veux_p; Poco X4 Pro 5G (India): peux_p; Note 11 Pro (China)/Xiaomi 11i: pissaro; Note 11 Pro+/Xiaomi 11i HyperCharge: pissaropro
- Website: www.mi.com/global/product/redmi-note-11/; www.po.co/global/product/poco-x4-pro-5g/; mobile.mi.com/in/xiaomi-11i-5g/; www.mi.com/sg/product/poco-m4-pro-5g/specs; www.po.co/global/product/poco-m4-pro/

The Redmi Note 11 is a line of Android-based smartphones as part of the Redmi Note series by Redmi, a sub-brand of Xiaomi Inc. It was released on 26 January 2022. It succeeds the Redmi Note 10 series of smartphones, which were introduced in 2021.

In India, the Chinese version of the Redmi Note 11 Pro and the global version of the Redmi Note 11 Pro+ were sold as the Xiaomi 11i (not to be confused with Mi 11i) and Xiaomi 11i HyperCharge respectively. Also, the Redmi Note 11 5G and Redmi Note 11 Pro 5G were released under Poco brand as the Poco M4 Pro 5G and Poco X4 Pro 5G with a different back design. Also, the Poco X4 Pro 5G for the Indian market features a main camera with a smaller resolution. Alongside the Poco X4 Pro 5G, Poco introduced the Poco M4 Pro, which has similar specifications to the Redmi Note 11S but with different back design and rear camera setup.

== List ==
As of February 2025, there are 18 variants of Redmi Note 11 phones, and Following list:

- Redmi Note 11
- Redmi Note 11 5G
- Redmi Note 11 4G (Redmi 10 on the global market)
- Redmi Note 11S
- Redmi Note 11S 5G
- Redmi Note 11 Pro
- Redmi Note 11 Pro (China)
- Redmi Note 11 Pro 5G
- Redmi Note 11 Pro+ 5G
- Redmi Note 11 Pro+ 5G (India)
- Redmi Note 11 SE
- Redmi Note 11E (Redmi 10 5G on the global market)
- Redmi Note 11E Pro
- Redmi Note 11R (Poco M4 5G on the global market)
- Redmi Note 11SE
- Redmi Note 11T 5G
- Redmi Note 11T Pro (Poco X4 GT on the global market and Redmi K50i in India)
- Redmi Note 11T Pro+

== Design ==
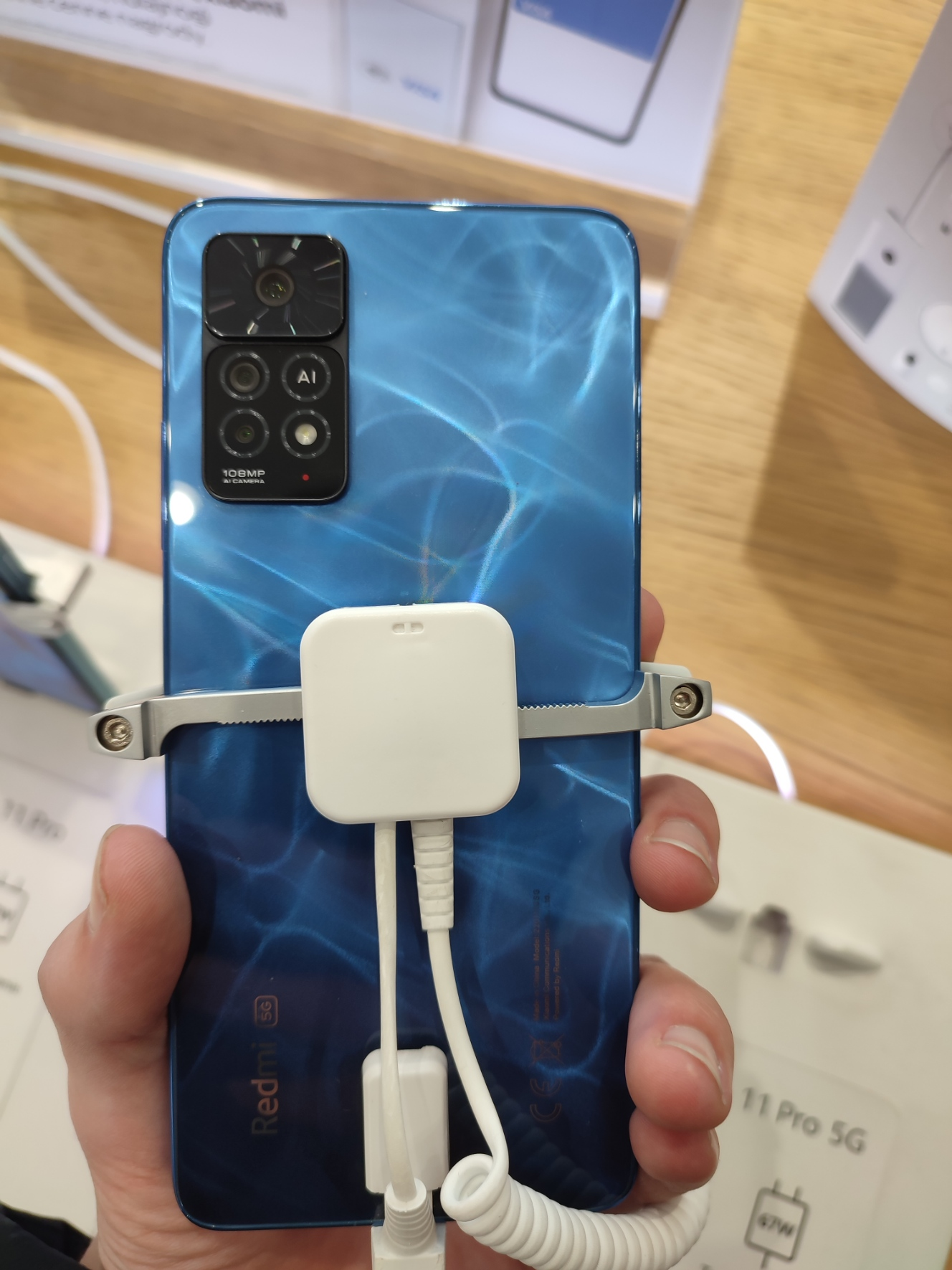
Redmi Note 11 Pro 5G in Atlantic Blue

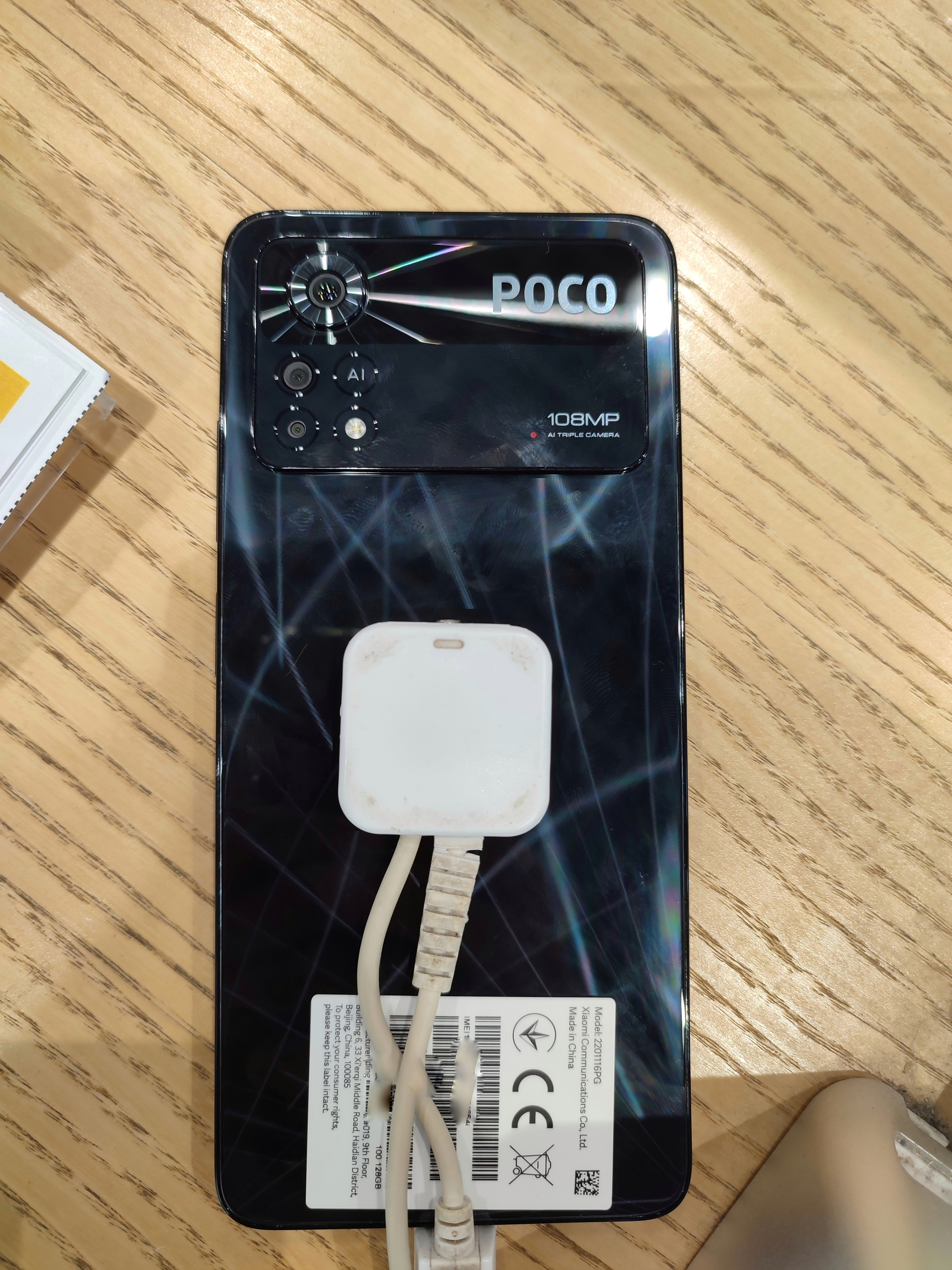
Poco X4 Pro 5G in Laser Black

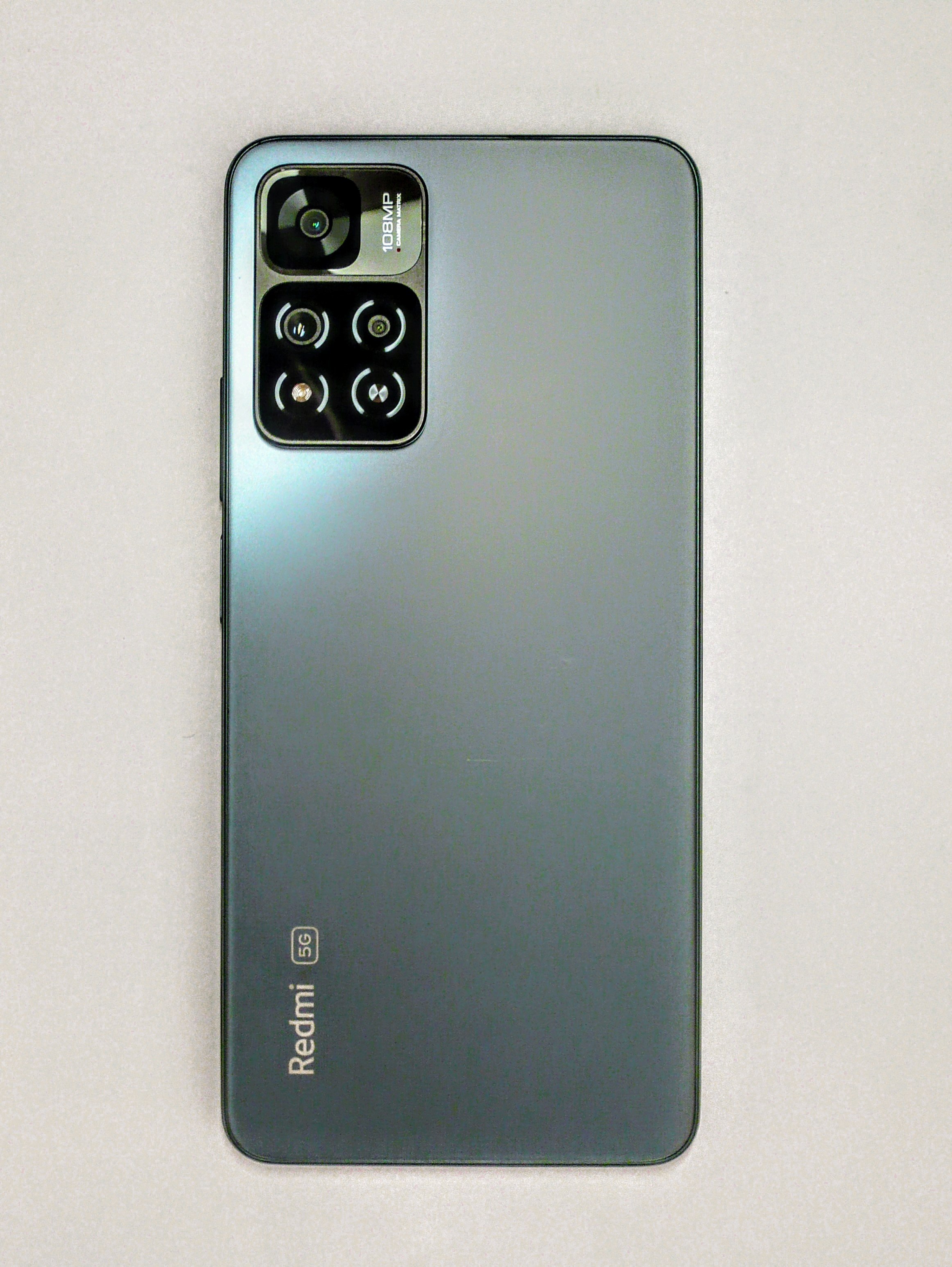
Redmi Note 11 Pro (China) in Forest Green

The Redmi Note 11, Note 11S, Note 11 5G/11T 5G, Note 11S 5G, and both versions of the Poco M4 Pro feature a flat front made of Gorilla Glass 3 and a curved plastic back, while other models feature a front and a back made of Gorilla Glass 5, which both are flat. The smartphones feature a plastic frame, which is flat on all models except the Redmi Note 11 5G/11T 5G, Note 11S 5G, and Poco M4 Pro 5G.

The design of most smartphones in the global Redmi Note 11 series is somewhere between that of the Redmi Note 10 series and the Mi 10T, while in the Chinese Redmi Note 11 series it is similar to that of the Redmi Note 10 Pro 5G. The Poco M4 Pro and X4 Pro 5G feature a design reminiscent of the Poco M3 and Mi 11 Ultra, with a camera island spanning the entire width of the back panel.

On the bottom side of the Redmi Note 11, Note 11S and Poco M4 Pro, there are a USB-C ports, a loudspeaker, a microphone, and a 3.5 mm audio jack. On the top side, there are an additional microphone, an IR blaster, and a second speaker. On the left side, there is a dual SIM tray with a microSD slot. On the right side, there are the volume rocker and the power button with an integrated fingerprint sensor.

== Specifications ==
=== Hardware ===
The Redmi Note 11 has a Qualcomm Snapdragon 680 4G, with an octa-core CPU and Adreno 610 GPU. The Redmi Note 11 and Note 11S have 6.43-inch FHD+ display and 5000 mAh Li-Po battery.

==== Memory ====
The smartphones were sold in the following memory configurations:

Configuration		Smartphone model												
ROM	RAM	Redmi Note 11	Redmi Note 11S	Redmi Note 11 5G	Redmi Note 11T	Redmi Note 11S 5G	Redmi Note 11 Pro	Redmi Note 11 Pro 5G	Redmi Note 11E Pro Redmi Note 11 Pro+ (India)	Redmi Note 11 Pro (China) Xiaomi 11i	Redmi Note 11 Pro+ Xiaomi 11i HyperCharge	Poco M4 Pro	Poco M4 Pro 5G	Poco X4 Pro 5G
64 GB	4 GB	Yes	No	No	Yes	Yes	No	No	No	No	No	No	Yes	No
64 GB	6 GB	Yes	Yes	No	Yes	No	Yes	Yes	Yes	No	No	Yes	Yes	Yes
128 GB	4 GB	Yes	No	Yes	No	Yes	Yes	Yes	No	No	No	No	Yes	No
128 GB	6 GB	Yes	Yes	Yes	Yes	Yes	Yes	Yes	Yes	Yes	Yes	Yes	Yes	Yes
128 GB	8 GB	No	Yes	Yes	Yes	Yes	Yes	Yes	Yes	Yes	Yes	Yes	Yes	Yes
256 GB	6 GB	No	No	No	No	No	No	No	No	No	No	No	No	Yes
256 GB	8 GB	No	No	Yes	No	No	No	Yes	Yes	Yes	Yes	Yes	Yes	Yes

All smartphones feature UFS 2.2 storage and LPDDR4X RAM. On all models except the Redmi Note 11 5G/11T 5G and the Chinese versions of the Note 11 Pro and Note 11 Pro+, the storage can be expanded via a microSD card by up to 1 TB.

==== Camera ====
The Redmi Note 11, Note 11S, and Note 11 Pro feature a quad camera setup, Redmi Note 11 5G/11T 5G and Poco M4 Pro 5G feature a dual camera setup, and other models feature a triple camera setup.

The Redmi Note 11, Note 11 5G/11T 5G, Note 11S 5G, and Poco M4 Pro 5G have a 50 MP wide-angle lens with an f/1.8 aperture, the Poco M4 Pro and Indian version of the Poco X4 Pro 5G have a 64 MP wide-angle lens with an f/1.8 aperture, and the rest of smartphones has a 108 MP wide-angle lens with an f/1.9 aperture. In all models the wide-angles lens has a phase detection autofocus. All models feature an 8 MP ultrawide-angle lens (120° field of view in the Redmi Note 11 Pro+ and Chinese Note 11 Pro, 119° Redmi Note 11 5G/11T 5G, Note 11S 5G and Poco M4 Pro 5G, or 118° in the rest of models) with an f/2.2 aperture. All models except Redmi Note 11 5G/11T 5G and Poco M4 Pro 5G feature a 2 MP macro lens with an f/2.4 aperture. Additionally, The Redmi Note 11, Note 11S, and Note 11 Pro feature a 2 MP depth sensor with an f/2.4 aperture. Redmi Note 11 Pro+ and Chinese Redmi Note 11 Pro can record video on a main camera at up to 4K at 30 fps, while other models can record video on a main camera at up to 1080p resolution and at up to 60 fps on the Redmi Note 11 5G/11T 5G, Note 11S 5G, and Poco M4 Pro 5G or up to 30 fps on the rest of models.

All models feature a wide-angle front camera. On the Redmi Note 11 and Note 11S 5G it has a 13 MP resolution and an f/2.4 aperture, on the Redmi Note 11 5G/11T 5G and Poco M4 Pro 5G it has a 16 MP resolution and an f/2.5 aperture, and on other models it has 16 MP resolution and an f/2.4 aperture. All models can record video on a front camera at up to 1080p@30fps.

==== Sound ====
The smartphones feature stereo speakers located at the top and bottom. The speakers on the Redmi Note 11 Pro+ and the Chinese version of the Redmi Note 11 Pro are tuned by JBL.

=== Software ===
The Redmi Note 11, 11S, 11S 5G, 11 Pro, and 11 Pro 5G/11E Pro/11 Pro+ (India) were released with MIUI 13, while the Redmi Note 11 5G, 11 Pro (China), and 11 Pro+ were released with MIUI 12.5. Also, the Poco M4 Pro 5G was released with MIUI 12.5 for Poco and the Poco M4 Pro and Poco X4 Pro 5G were released with MIUI 13 for Poco. On all smartphones it is based on Android 11. Later, the smartphones were updated to Xiaomi HyperOS based on Android 13.
