= Redmi 10 =

Android smartphone series made by Xiaomi

Redmi 10 Redmi 10 Prime Redmi Note 11 4G Redmi 10 2022 Redmi 10 Prime 2022

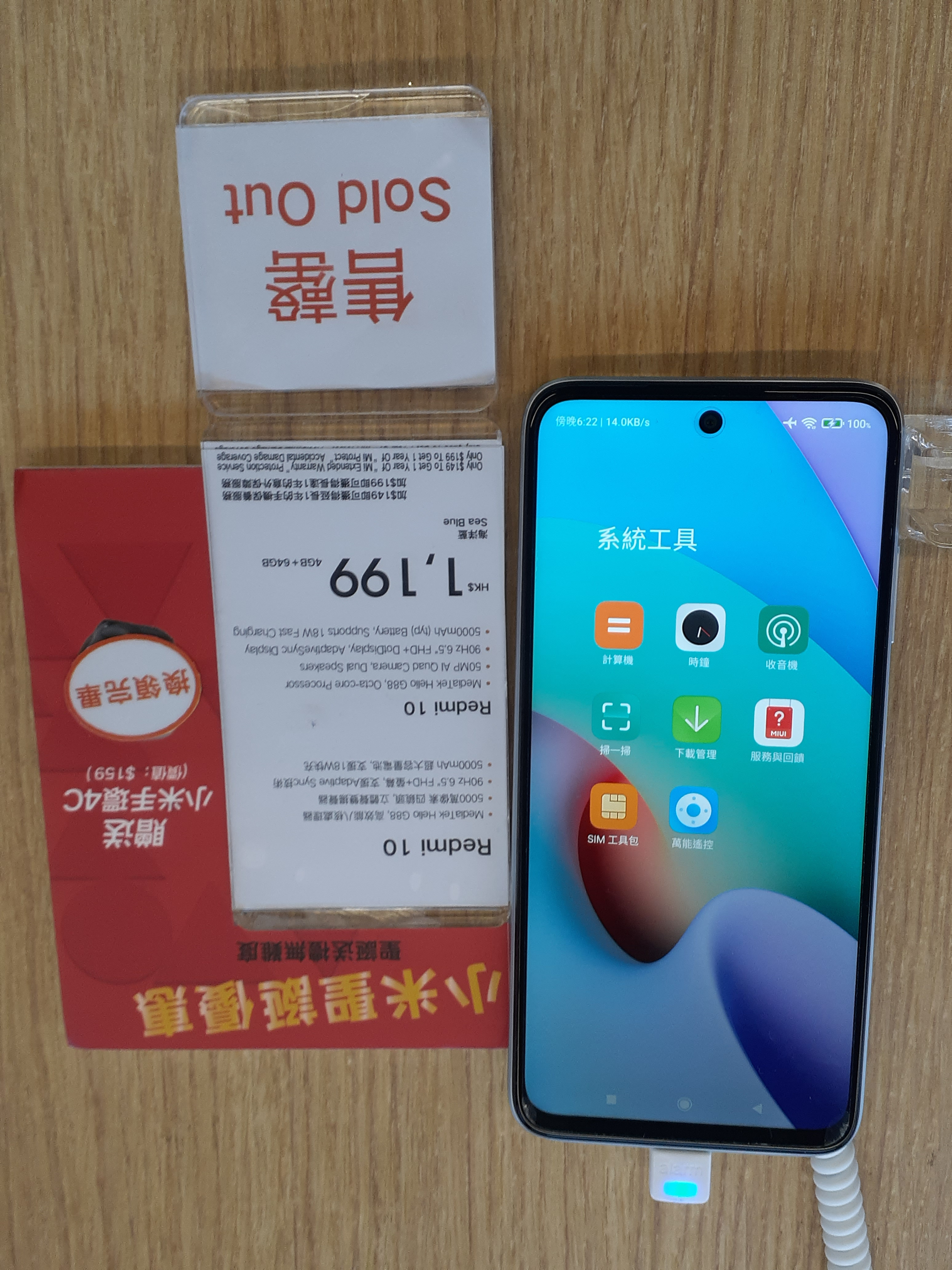
- Redmi 10 in Pebble White
- Brand: Redmi
- Manufacturer: Xiaomi
- Type: Phablet
- Series: Redmi/Redmi Note
- First released: 10: August 18, 2021; 4 years ago 10 Prime: September 3, 2021; 4 years ago Note 11 4G: November 25, 2021; 4 years ago 10 2022: February 15, 2022; 4 years ago 10 Prime 2022: May 9, 2022; 4 years ago
- Availability by region: 10: August 20, 2021; 10 Prime: September 7, 2021; 4 years ago Note 11 4G: December 1, 2021; 4 years ago 10 2022: May 11, 2022; 4 years ago
- Predecessor: Redmi 9 Redmi Note 9 4G
- Successor: Redmi 12; Redmi 11 Prime; Redmi 11 Prime 5G
- Related: Redmi 10A; Redmi 10C; Redmi 10 5G; Redmi Note 10; Redmi Note 11
- Compatible networks: GSM / HSPA / LTE
- Form factor: Slate
- Colors: 10/2022: Carbon Gray; Pebble White; Sea Blue; 10 Prime/Prime 2022: Phantom Black; Astral White; Bifrost Blu; Note 11 4G: Mysterious Black Realm; Time Monologue; Dream Clear Sky
- Dimensions: 162 mm (6.4 in) H 75.9 mm (2.99 in) W 10/10 2022/Note 11 4G: 8.9 mm (0.35 in) D 10 Prime: 9.6 mm (0.38 in) D
- Weight: 10/10 2022/Note 11 4G: 181 g (6.4 oz); 10 Prime/10 Prime 2022: 192 g (6.8 oz)
- Operating system: Original: Android 11, MIUI 12.5; Current: Android 13, MIUI 14
- System-on-chip: MediaTek Helio G88 (12nm)
- CPU: Octa-core (2x2.0 GHz Cortex-A75 & 6x1.8 GHz Cortex-A55)
- GPU: Mali-G52 MC2
- Memory: 4 GB, 6 GB; LPDDR4X RAM
- Storage: 10/10 Prime/10 2022/10 Prime 2022: 64 GB, 128 GB; Note 11 4G: 128 GB eMMC 5.1
- Removable storage: microSDXC up to 512 GB
- SIM: 10/10 Prime/Note 11 4G: Dual SIM (Nano-SIM, dual stand-by); 10 2022/10 Prime 2022: hybrid Dual SIM (Nano-SIM, dual stand-by)
- Battery: 10/10 2022/Note 11 4G: 5000 mAh; 10 Prime/10 Prime 2022: 6000 mAh
- Charging: Fast charging 18W; Reverse charging 9W
- Rear camera: 10/10 Prime/10 2022/10 Prime 2022: 50 MP, f/1.8, (wide), PDAF; 8 MP, f/2.2, 120˚ (ultrawide); 2 MP, f/2.4, (macro); 2 MP, f/2.4 (depth); Note 11 4G: 50 MP, f/1.8, (wide), PDAF; 8 MP, f/2.2, 120˚ (ultrawide); 2 MP, f/2.4, (macro); LED flash, HDR, panorama 1080p@30fps
- Front camera: 8 MP, f/2.0, (wide), 1/4.0”, 1.12 μm HDR, panorama 1080p@30fps
- Display: 6.5 in (170 mm); 102.0 cm2 (~83.4% screen-to-body ratio); 1080 x 2400 pixels, 20:9 aspect ratio (~405 ppi density); LCD, 90Hz refresh rate Corning Gorilla Glass 3
- Sound: Stereo speakers
- Connectivity: Wi-Fi 802.11 a/b/g/n/ac, dual-band, Wi-Fi Direct, hotspot Bluetooth 5.1, A2DP, LE; A-GPS, GLONASS, GALILEO, BDS; NFC (10/10 2022; market/region dependent), FM Radio
- Data inputs: USB Type-C 2.0; Sensors: Fingerprint scanner (side-mounted); Accelerometer; Proximity sensor; Compass
- Water resistance: Dust & splash proof
- Model: 10: 21061119AG, 21061119DG, 21061119AL; 10 Prime: 21061119BI; Note 11 4G: 21121119SC; 10 2022: 21121119VL; 10 Prime 2022: 22011119TI
- Codename: 10/10 Prime: selene Note 11 4G/10 2022/10 Prime 2022: selenes
- SAR: 10 Prime: Head: 1.10 W/kg; Body: 0.78 W/kg
- Website: www.mi.com/global/product/redmi-10/

The Redmi 10 is an Android-based smartphone as part of the Redmi series, a sub-brand of Xiaomi Inc. This device was announced on August 18, 2021.

The Redmi 10 also has some variants:

- The Redmi 10 Prime which is the Indian variant of the Redmi 10 with a bigger battery.
- The Redmi Note 11 4G which is the Chinese variant of the Redmi 10 without a depth sensor.
- The Redmi 10 2022 which has a hybrid Dual SIM tray instead of a full-fledged SIM tray which is present in the Redmi 10.
- The Redmi 10 Prime 2022 which is the Indian variant of the Redmi 10 2022 with a bigger battery.

== Design ==
Front made of Gorilla Glass 3. The back and frame are made of plastic. The design is similar to the Chinese Redmi Note 11 series.

On the bottom of smartphones, there is a USB-C port, speaker, and microphone. On the top, there is 3.5mm audio jack, an additional microphone, IR blaster, and a second speaker. On the left, there is a dual SIM tray (SIM1 + SIM 2 or SIM1 + microSD) in 2022 models or dual SIM tray with microSD(Up to 512GB) slot in other models. On the right, there is the volume rocker and the power button with a mounted fingerprint scanner.

The phones were sold in the next colors:

Color	Name		
Color	Redmi 10/10 2022	Redmi 10 Prime/10 Prime 2022	Redmi Note 11 4G
	Carbon Gray	Phantom Black	Mysterious Black Realm
	Pebble White	Astral White	Time Monologue
	Sea Blue	Bifrost Blue	Dream Clear Sky

== Specifications ==
=== Hardware ===
==== Chipset ====
The smartphones are equipped withe the octa-core MediaTek Helio G88 containing two 2.2 GHz Cortex-A75 cores, six 1.8 GHz Cortex-A55 cores, and a 1 GHz Mali-G52 MC2 GPU, which is a small revision of the MediaTek Helio G85 with 90 Hz @ 1080p+ refresh rate and up to 64 MP camera resolution support.

==== Display ====
The smartphones have a 6.5 in (165,1 mm) IPS LCD with FHD+ (2400x1080) resolution (395 ppi with 20:9 aspect ratio), 16M colors, 90 Hz refresh rate and punch hole in upper center.

==== Battery ====
The Redmi 10, 10 2022 and Note 11 4G have non-removable 5000 mAh Li-Po battery when the Redmi 10 Prime and 10 Prime 2022 have 6000 mAh. All models support 18W fast charging and 9W reverse charging. The in-box charger has 22.5W power.

=== Software ===
The smartphones were released with MIUI 12.5 based on Android 11 and were updated to MIUI 14 based on Android 13. The Redmi 10 is the first Xiaomi smartphone with the built-in memory extension feature which extends 1GB to RAM with 64GB and 2GB with 128GB storage.

Preceded by Redmi 9/Prime	Redmi 10/Prime; 2021	Succeeded by Redmi 10 2022/Prime 2022
Preceded by Redmi 10	Redmi 10 2022; 2022	Succeeded by Redmi 12
Preceded by Redmi 10 Prime	Redmi 10 Prime 2022; 2022	Succeeded by Redmi 11 Prime
Preceded by Redmi 10 Prime	Redmi 10 Prime 2022; 2022	Succeeded by Redmi 11 Prime 5G
Preceded by Redmi Note 9 4G	Redmi Note 11 4G; 2021	Most recent
