= Redmi 9C =

Series of smartphone models by Xiaomi

Redmi 9C (POCO C31 in India) Redmi 9C NFC (Redmi 9 and Redmi 9 Activ in India) POCO C3
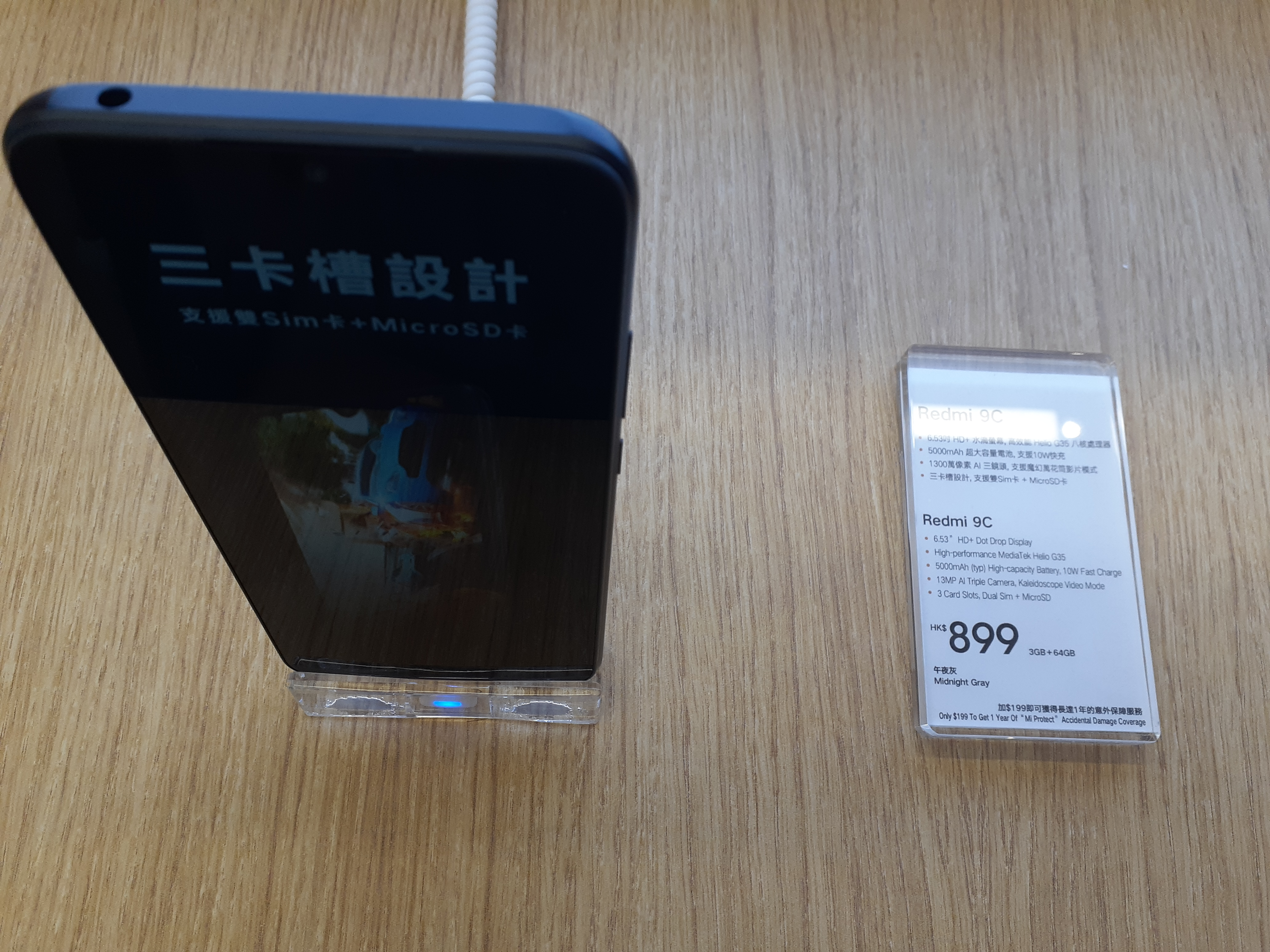
- Brand: Redmi
- Developer: Xiaomi
- Manufacturer: Xiaomi
- First released: 9C: August 12, 2020; 9C NFC: August 27, 2020; POCO C3: October 6, 2020; 9 Activ: September 25, 2021; POCO C31: September 30, 2021
- Predecessor: Redmi 8A Pro; Redmi 8
- Successor: Redmi 10C; Redmi 10 (India); Poco C40
- Related: Redmi 9 Redmi 9A; Redmi 9T
- Colors: 9C/9C NFC: Midnight Gray, Sunrise Orange, Twilight Blue; Redmi 9: Carbon Gray, Sunset Purple, Ocean Green, Pink/Blue; POCO C3: Arctic Blue, Lime Green, Matte Black; POCO C31: Royal Blue, Shadow Gray
- Operating system: 9C/9C NFC/9/Activ: Initial: Android 10 + MIUI 12; Current: Android 11 + MIUI 12.5; POCO C3/C31: Initial: Android 10 + MIUI 12 for POCO; Current: POCO C3: Android 10 + MIUI 12 for POCO; POCO C3: Android 11 + MIUI 12.5 for POCO
- System-on-chip: MediaTek MT6765G Helio G35 (12 nm)
- CPU: 8 cores (4×2.3 GHz Cortex-A53 & 4×1.8 GHz Cortex-A53)
- GPU: PowerVR GE8320 (680 MHz)
- Memory: 9C/9C NFC: 2/3 GB; POCO C3/C31: 3/4 GB; 9: 4 GB; 9 Activ: 4/6 GB LPDDR4X
- Storage: 9C, 9C NFC, POCO C3 & C31: 32/64 GB; 9 & 9 Activ: 64/128 GB eMMC 5.1
- Battery: Non-revomable Li-po 5,000 mAh
- Charging: 10 W
- Rear camera: 9C/POCO C3/C31: 13 MP, f/2.2, 28 mm (wide), 1.0 μm, PDAF + 2 MP, f/2.4, (macro) + 2 MP, f/2.4 (depth sensor); 9/Activ/9C NFC: 13 MP, f/2.2 (wide), 1.0 μm, PDAF + 2 MP, f/2.4 (depth sensor) LED flash, HDR; Video: 1080p @30fps
- Front camera: 5 MP, f/2.2 (wide), 1.12 μm HDR; Video: 1080p @30fps
- Display: IPS LCD, 6.53", 1600 × 720 (HD+), 20:9, 269 ppi
- Website: https://www.mi.com/global/redmi-9c/

The Redmi 9C and Redmi 9C NFC are entry-level Android smartphones developed by Xiaomi's sub-brand Redmi. The Redmi 9C NFC differs by having an NFC module and only two rear camera lenses, unlike the Redmi 9C, which has a triple rear camera setup. The Redmi 9C was introduced on June 30, 2020, along with the Redmi 9A. The Redmi 9C NFC was introduced on August 27, 2020.

Also on August 27, the Redmi 9 was introduced in India, which is an Indian version of the Redmi 9C NFC and differs by having more memory and no NFC module.

== History ==
On October 6, 2020, the POCO C3 was introduced, which is an Indian version of the Redmi 9C and differs slightly in the design of the back panel and lacks a fingerprint scanner.

On September 23, 2021, the Redmi 9 Activ was introduced in India, which differs from the Indian Redmi 9 with two new colors and more RAM.

On September 30, 2021, the POCO C31 was introduced in India, which generally differs from the POCO C3 in colors and has a fingerprint scanner.

== Specifications ==
=== Design ===
The front is made of glass and the case is made of plastic.

At the bottom is a microUSB port, a speaker, and a microphone. At the top, there's a 3.5mm audio jack. On the left side of the smartphone, there's a slot for 2 SIM cards and a microSD memory card up to 512 GB. On the right side, there are volume control buttons and a power button. The fingerprint scanner is located at the center on the back panel.

The phone is available with multiple colors, depending on the model:

- The Redmi 9C and Redmi 9C NFC were sold in 3 colors: Midnight Gray, Sunrise Orange, and Twilight Blue.
- In India, the Redmi 9 was sold in 3 colors: Midnight Gray, Sunshine Yellow, and Twilight Blue and Carbon Black, Coral Green, and Metallic Purple for the Redmi 9 Activ.
- The POCO C3 was sold in 3 colors: Arctic Blue, Lime Green, and Matte Black.
- The POCO C31 was sold in 2 colors: Royal Blue and Shadow Gray.

=== Processor and GPU ===
The smartphones feature a MediaTek Helio G35 SoC with PowerVR GE8320 GPU.

=== Battery ===
All smartphones received a battery capacity of 5000 mAh.

=== Camera ===
The Redmi 9C, POCO C3, and POCO C31 feature a triple rear camera setup consisting of a 13MP, f/2.2 wide-angle lens with phase-detection autofocus and a 2MP, f/2.4 macro lens and depth sensor. The Redmi 9C NFC, Indian Redmi 9, and Redmi 9 Activ lack the macro lens.

All smartphones in this series have a 5MP, f/2.2 wide-angle front-facing camera.

Both the rear and front cameras on all models can record video at 1080p resolution at 30 fps.

=== Display ===
The devices have a 6.53" IPS LCD screen with an HD+ (1600 × 720 pixels) resolution, a 20:9 aspect ratio, 269 ppi pixel density, and a teardrop notch for the front camera.

=== Storage ===
- The Redmi 9C and Redmi 9C NFC were available in 2GB/32GB, 3GB/64GB and 4/128 storage configurations.
- The POCO C3 and C31 were available in 3GB/32GB and 4GB/64GB storage configurations.
- The Redmi 9 was available in 4GB/64GB and 4GB/128GB storage configurations.
- The Redmi 9 Activ was available in 4GB/64GB and 6GB/128GB storage configurations.

=== Software ===
Both versions of the Redmi 9C, the Indian Redmi 9, and the Redmi 9 Activ were released with MIUI 12. The POCO C3 and C31 came with MIUI 12 for POCO. Both interfaces are based on Android 10. Both versions of the Redmi 9C, the Indian Redmi 9, and the Redmi 9 Activ have been updated to MIUI 12.5 based on Android 11, while the POCO C31 has been updated to MIUI 12.5 for POCO based on Android 11.
