= Redmi 9 =

Smartphone model by Redmi

Redmi 9 (Redmi 9 Prime in India) Poco M2
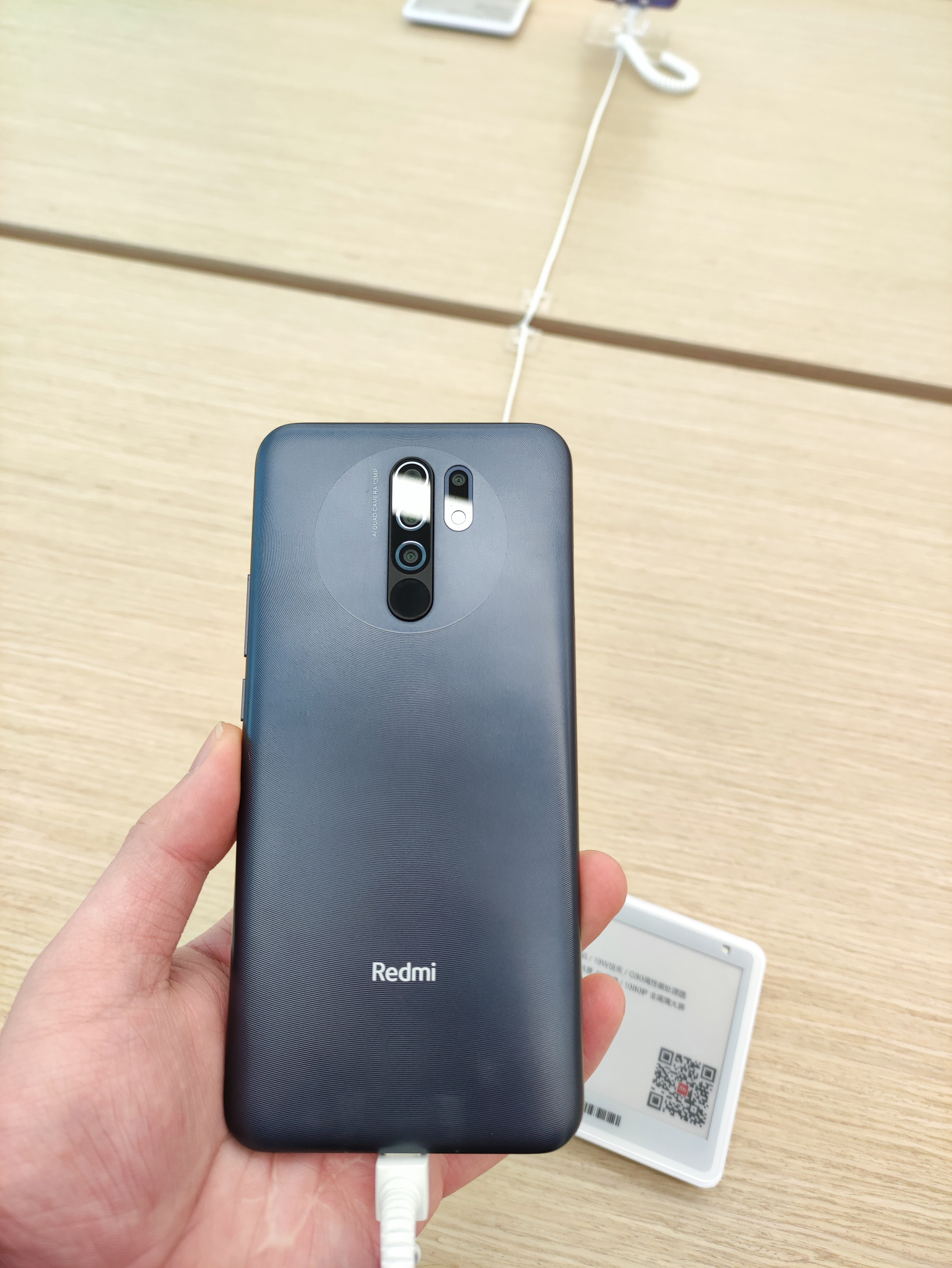
- Type: Smartphone
- Series: Redmi
- First released: June 10, 2020; 6 years ago
- Predecessor: Redmi 8
- Successor: Redmi 10; Poco M3
- Related: Redmi 9A; Redmi 9C; Redmi 9T
- Form factor: Slate
- Dimensions: 163.3 mm × 77 mm × 9.1 mm (6.43 in × 3.03 in × 0.36 in)
- Weight: 198 g (7.0 oz)
- Operating system: Android 10 based on MIUI 11, upgradeable to Android 12 based on MIUI 13
- CPU: Mediatek MT6769V/CU Helio G80 (12 nm)
- GPU: Mali-G52 MC2
- Memory: 3 GB, 4 GB or 6 GB LPDDR4X
- Storage: 32 GB, 64 GB, or 128 GB eMMC 5.1
- Removable storage: Dedicated Slot, microSDXC, upto 256 GB
- SIM: Dual Nano-SIM, DSDS
- Battery: Li-Po 5020 mAh, non-removable
- Charging: 18 W Fast Charging (9V@2A)
- Rear camera: Quad-Camera Setup; Primary: OmniVision PureCel®Plus OV13B10; 13 MP, f/2.2, 27mm (wide), FoV 75°, 1/3.1", 1.12 µm, PDAF; Ultrawide: Samsung ISOCELL S5K4H7; 8 MP, f/2.2, 15mm, FoV 118°, 1/4.0", 1.12 µm, FF; Macro: OmniVision PureCel® OV5675; 5 MP, f/2.4, 23mm, 1/5.0", 1.12 µm, FF; Depth: OmniVision OV02B1B; 2 MP, f/2.4, 1/5.0", 1.75 µm, FF; Camera features: LED flash, HDR, Panorama; Video recording: 1080p@30fps
- Front camera: OmniVision PureCel® OV8856; 8 MP, f/2.05, 26mm (wide), FoV 78°, 1/4.0", 1.12 µm, FF; Camera features: HDR; Video recording: 1080p@30fps
- Display: 6.53 inches, 1080 × 2340 pixels, 19.5:9 ratio (~395 ppi density), Corning Gorilla Glass 3
- Connectivity: 802.11 a/b/g/n/ac, dual-band, Wi-Fi Direct Bluetooth 5.0; GPS, GLONASS, BDS; NFC (Global Only); Infrared Blaster; Wireless FM radio (no wired headphones required) USB Type-C 2.0, OTG
- Model: 9: M2004J19G, M2004J19C; 9 Prime: M2004J19PI; Poco M2: M2004J19PI, MZB9919IN
- Codename: 9/Prime: lancelot 9 (NFC): galahad Poco M2: shiva
- Development status: Discontinued
- Website: https://www.mi.com/in/redmi-9-prime/
- References: https://www.mi.com/uk/redmi-9/

Redmi 9 was released in June 2020 globally and offers a 6.5-inch FHD+ display (2340x1080p resolution) with 89% screen-to-body ratio. The handset is powered by MediaTek Helio G80 coupled with up to 6 GB RAM and 128 GB internal storage.

For imaging duties, the Redmi 9 has a quad-camera setup of 13 MP+8 MP+5 MP+2 MP. On the front, there is an 8 MP sensor with f/2.0 aperture. Backed by a 5020 mAh battery, the handset offers 18 W fast charge support.

The same phone was released in India as Redmi 9 Prime in August 2020. This was first time since Redmi 3s Prime that the Prime moniker was used in Redmi series. The phone is identical to Global Redmi 9 except it lacks an NFC chip.

The phone was released with MIUI 11 based on Android 10 and was upgraded to Android 11 (MIUI 12) and finally to MIUI 13 based on Android 12.
