= Redmi Note 10 =

2021/2022 Android-based smartphone made by Xiaomi

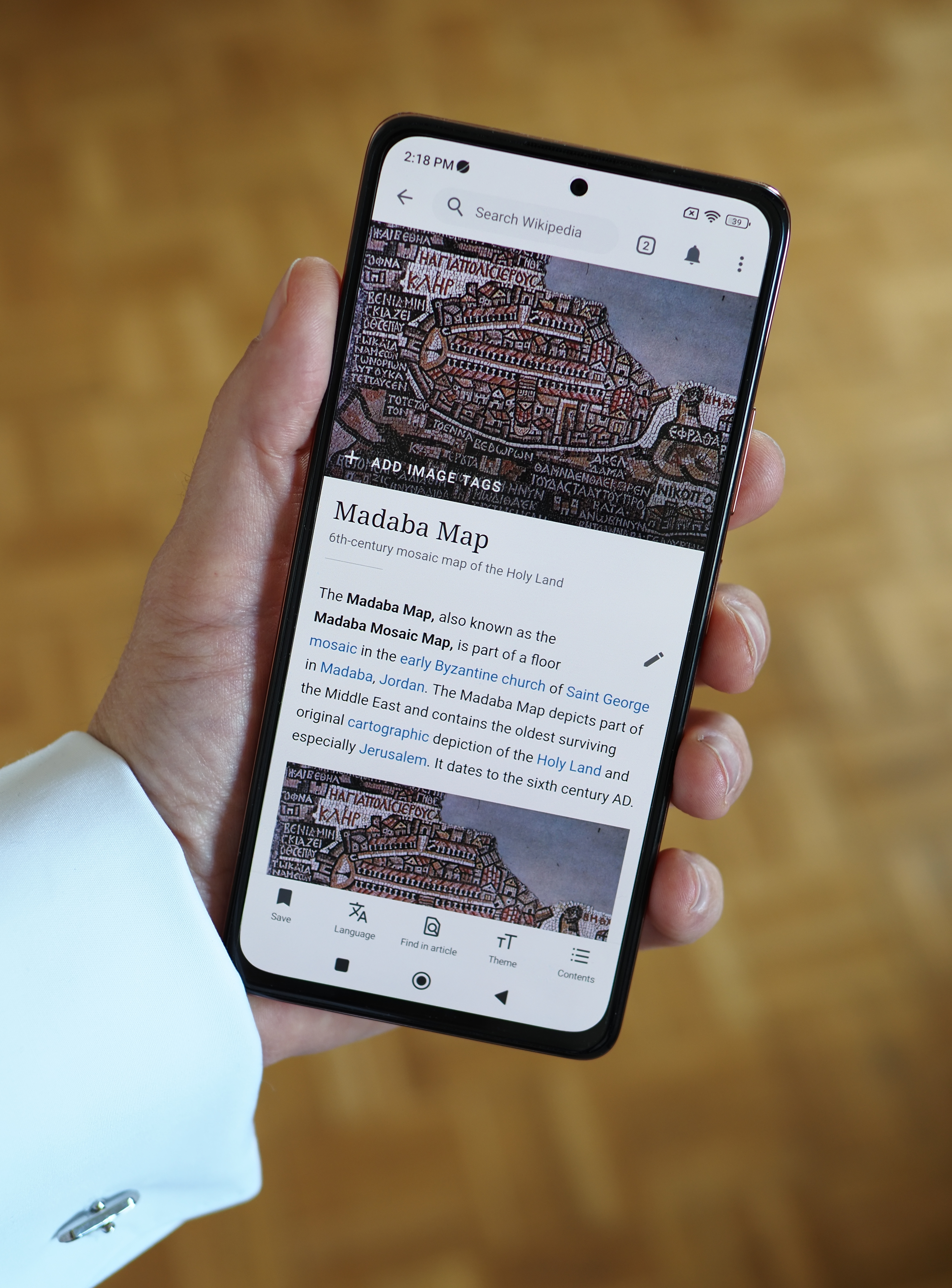
- Redmi Note 10 Pro (Global)
- Brand: Redmi, Poco
- Manufacturer: Xiaomi
- Type: Phablet
- Series: Redmi Note; Poco M/X
- First released: Note 10/ 10S/ 5G/ Pro/ Pro Max: 4 March 2021; 5 years ago Poco M3 Pro 5G (Global): 19 May 2021; 5 years ago Note 10 5G (China)/Note 10 Pro 5G: 26 May 2021; 5 years ago Poco M3 Pro 5G (India): 8 June 2021; 5 years ago Poco X3 GT: 19 July 2021; 5 years ago Note 10 JE: 2 August 2021; 5 years ago Note 10T (Japan): 15 April 2022; 4 years ago Note 11SE: 24 April 2022; 4 years ago Note 11 SE: 24 August 2022; 4 years ago Poco M5s: 5 September 2022; 4 years ago
- Predecessor: Redmi Note 9 Poco M2 Pro
- Successor: Redmi Note 11; Redmi Note 14 SE 5G; Poco M8s
- Related: Redmi 10; Poco M3; Poco X3; Poco M5; Redmi Note 12 Pro
- Compatible networks: 2G, 3G, 4G (LTE), 5G (only 5G models)
- Form factor: Slate
- Dimensions: Note 10/10S/11 SE/Poco M5s: 160.5 mm × 74.5 mm × 8.3 mm (6.32 in × 2.93 in × 0.33 in); Note 10 5G/ JE/11SE/Poco M3 Pro: 161.8 mm × 75.3 mm × 8.9 mm (6.37 in × 2.96 in × 0.35 in); Note 10 Pro/ Pro Max: 164 mm × 76.5 mm × 8.1 mm (6.46 in × 3.01 in × 0.32 in); Note 10 Pro 5G/Poco X3 GT: 163.3 mm × 75.9 mm × 8.9 mm (6.43 in × 2.99 in × 0.35 in)
- Weight: Note 10/10S/11 SE/Poco M5s: 178.8 g (6.31 oz); Note 10 5G/11SE/Poco M3 Pro: 190 g (6.7 oz); Note 10 JE: 200 g (7.1 oz); Note 10 Pro/ Pro Max/ Pro 5G/Poco X3 GT: 193 g (6.8 oz)
- Operating system: Original: Note 10/ 5G/ Pro/ Pro Max/11SE/Poco M3 Pro: MIUI 12 based on Android 11; Note 10S/ Pro 5G/ JE/ 11 SE: MIUI 12.5 based on Android 11; Note 10T (Japan): MIUI 13 based on Android 11; Poco M5s: MIUI 13 For Poco based on Android 12; Current: Note 10: MIUI 14 based on Android 12; Note 10 Pro (India)/ Pro Max: MIUI 13 based on Android 12; Note 10S / 5G/ 10T/ Pro/ Pro 5G / JE/ 11SE/ 11 SE: MIUI 14 based on Android 13; Poco M3 Pro/M5s/X3 GT: MIUI 14 For Poco based on Android 13
- System-on-chip: Note 10: Qualcomm Snapdragon 678; Note 10S/11 SE/Poco M5s: MediaTek Helio G95; Note 10 5G/11SE/Poco M3 Pro: MediaTek Dimensity 700; Note 10 JE: Qualcomm Snapdragon 480; Note 10 Pro/ Pro Max: Qualcomm Snapdragon 732G; Note 10 Pro 5G/Poco X3 GT: MediaTek Dimensity 1100
- CPU: Note 10: Octa-core (2x 2.2 GHz Kryo 460 Gold + 6x 1.7 GHz Kryo 460 Silver); Note 10S/11 SE/Poco M5s: Octa-core (2x 2.05 GHz Cortex-A76 + 6x 2.0 GHz Cortex-A55); Note 10 5G/11SE/Poco M3 Pro: Octa-core (2x 2.2 GHz Cortex-A76 + 6x 2.0 GHz Cortex-A55); Note 10 JE: Octa-core (2x 2.0 GHz Kryo 460 Gold + 6x 1.8 GHz Kryo 460 Silver); Note 10 Pro / Pro Max: Octa-core (2x 2.3 GHz Kryo 470 Gold + 6x 1.8 GHz Kryo 470 Silver); Note 10 Pro 5G/Poco X3 GT: Octa-core (4x 2.6 GHz Cortex-A78 + 4x 2.0 GHz Cortex-A55)
- GPU: Note 10: Adreno 612; Note 10S/11 SE/Poco M5s: Mali-G76 MC4; Note 10 5G/11SE/Poco M3 Pro: Mali-G57 MC2; Note 10 JE: Adreno 619; Note 10 Pro/ Pro Max: Adreno 618; Note 10 Pro 5G/Poco X3 GT: Mali-G77 MC9
- Memory: LPDDR4X RAM Note 10/5G/Poco M3 Pro/M5s: 4/6 GB; Note 10S: 4/6/8 GB; Note 10 Pro/ Pro Max/ Pro 5G: 6/8 GB; Note 11SE: 4/8 GB; Note 10 JE: 4 GB
- Storage: Note 10/ 10S/ 5G/ Pro/ Pro Max/ 11 SE/Poco M3 Pro/M5s: 64/128 GB; UFS 2.2; Note 11SE: 128 GB; UFS 2.2; Note 10 Pro 5G/Poco X3 GT: 128/256 GB; UFS 3.1; Note 10 JE: 64 GB; UFS 2.2
- Removable storage: Note 10/10S/10 5G/10 Pro/11SE/Poco M3 Pro/Note 10 Pro Max: microSDXC, expandable up to 512 GB; Note 10 Pro 5G/Poco X3 GT: none
- SIM: Nano-SIM, 2 Dedicated Slots, DSDS
- Battery: Note 10/10S/5G/Pro 5G/11SE/11 SE/Poco M3 Pro/M5s/X3 GT: 5000 mAh Li-Po; Note 10 JE: 4800 mAh Li-Po; Note 10 Pro/ Pro Max: 5020 mAh Li-Po
- Charging: Note 10/10S/Pro/Pro Max/11 SE/Poco M5s: Fast charging 33W; Note 10 5G/JE/11SE/Poco M3 Pro: Fast charging 18W; Note 10 Pro 5G/Poco X3 GT: Fast charging 67W
- Rear camera: Note 10: 48 MP Sony IMX582, f/1.8, 26mm (wide), 1/2.0", 0.8 μm, PDAF + 8 MP, f/2.2, 118˚ (ultrawide), 1/4.0", 1.12 μm + 2 MP, f/2.4, (macro) + 2 MP, f/2.4, (depth) LED flash, HDR, panorama, 4K@30 fps, 1080p@30/60 fps Note 10S/11 SE/Poco M5s: 64 MP Samsung GW3, 0.7 μm, f/1.9, 4 in 1 Super Pixel, 6P + 8 MP, f/2.2, 118˚ (ultrawide), 1/4.0", 1.12 μm + 2 MP, f/2.4, (macro) + 2 MP, f/2.4, (depth) LED flash, HDR, panorama, 4K@30 fps, 1080p@30/60/120 fps, 720p@960 fps Note 10 5G/Note 11 SE/Poco M3 Pro: 48 MP Omnivision OV48B, f/1.8, 26mm (wide), 1/2.0", 0.8 μm, PDAF + 2 MP, f/2.4, (macro) + 2 MP, f/2.4, (depth) LED flash, HDR, panorama 1080p@30fps Note 10 JE: 48 MP Samsung S5KGM1st, f/1.8, 26mm (wide), 1/2.0", 0.8 μm, PDAF + 2 MP, f/2.4, (macro) + 2 MP, f/2.4, (depth) LED flash, HDR, panorama, 1080p@30 fps Note 10 Pro: 108 MP Samsung GW3, 0.7 μm, f/1.9, 4 in 1 Super Pixel, 6P + 8 MP, f/2.2, 118˚ (ultrawide), 1/4.0", 1.12 μm + 5 MP, f/2.4, (macro), AF + 2 MP, f/2.4, (depth) LED flash, HDR, panorama, 4K@30fps, 1080p@30/60/120 fps, 720p@960 fps Redmi Note 10 Pro Max: 108 MP Samsung HM2, f/1.9, 26mm (wide),9 in 1 Super Pixel, 6P, 1/1.52", 0.7 μm, PDAF + 8 MP, f/2.2, 118˚ (ultrawide), 1/4.0", 1.12 μm + 5 MP, f/2.4, (macro), AF + 2 MP, f/2.4, (depth) LED flash, HDR, panorama, 4K@30 fps, 1080p@30/60/120 fps, 720p@960 fps Note 10 Pro 5G/Poco X3 GT: 64 MP OmniVision OV64B, 0.7 μm, f/1.8, 4 in 1 Super Pixel, 6P + 8 MP, f/2.2, 120˚ (ultrawide), 1/4.0", 1.12 μm + 2 MP, f/2.4, (macro), AF Dual-LED dual-tone flash, HDR, panorama, 4K@30 fps, 1080p@30/60/120 fps, 720p@960 fps, HDR
- Front camera: Note 10/10S/11 SE/Poco M5s: 13 MP OmniVision OV13B10, f/2.5, (wide); Note 10 5G /JE/11SE/Poco M3 Pro: 8 MP, f/2.0, (wide); Note 10 Pro/Pro Max/Pro 5G/Poco X3 GT: 16MP Exmor IMX471, f/2.45, 1.0 μm Video: 1080p@30 fps
- Display: Note 10/10S/11 SE/ Poco M5s: Super AMOLED capacitive touchscreen 6.43 in (163 mm) 1080 x 2400 pixels, 20:9 aspect ratio) (~409 ppi density), 60 Hz refresh rate, 450nits(typ), 700nits(HBM), 1100nits(Peak); Note 10 5G/ JE/11SE/Poco M3 Pro: IPS LCD capacitive touchscreen 6.5 in (165 mm) 1080 x 2400 pixels, 20:9 aspect ratio) (~405 ppi density), 90 Hz refresh rate, 400nits(typ), 500nits(HBM); Note 10 Pro/ Pro Max: Super AMOLED capacitive touchscreen 6.67 in (169 mm) 1080 x 2400 pixels, 20:9 aspect ratio) (~395 ppi density), HDR10, HLG, 120 Hz refresh rate, 450nits (typ), 700nits(HBM), 1200nits(peak); Note 10 Pro 5G/Poco X3 GT: IPS LCD capacitive touchscreen 6.6 in (168 mm) 1080 x 2400 pixels, 20:9 aspect ratio) (~399 ppi density), HDR10, 120 Hz refresh rate, 450nits(typ), 500nits(HBM)
- Connectivity: Bluetooth 5.0 (Note 10)/5.1/5.2 (Note 10 Pro 5G/Poco X3 GT); Wi-Fi 802.11a/b/g/n/ac/6 (Note 10 Pro 5G/Poco X3 GT) (2.4 & 5 GHz), dual-band, WiFi Direct, hotspot A2DP, LE, IR Blaster
- Data inputs: Sensors: Fingerprint scanner (capacitive); Accelerometer; Gyroscope; Proximity sensor Hall-effect sensor Magnetometer
- Water resistance: IP53
- Model: Note 10: M2101K7AG, M2101K7AI; Note 10S: M2101K7BG, M2101K7BI, M2101K7BL, M2101K7BNY; Note 11 SE: 22087RA4DI; Poco M5s: 2207117BPG; Note 10 5G: M2103K19G, M2103K19C; Note 10T 5G: M2103K19I; Note 10 Pro: M2101K6G, M2101K6P, M2101K6R; Note 10 Pro Max: M2101K6I; Note 10 Pro 5G: 2104K10AC; Poco X3 GT: 21061110AG
- Codename: Note 10: mojito Note 10 (India): sunny Note 10S/11 SE: secret Note 10S (Latin America): maltose Note 10S (NFC): rosemary Poco M5s: rosemary_p Note 10 5G/10T/Poco M3 Pro 5G: camellian Note 10 5G (China)/10T 5G/11SE: camellia Note 10 Pro: sweet Note 10 Pro (India)/Max: sweetin Note 10 Pro 5G/Poco X3 GT: chopin Note 10 JE (Japan): iris Note 10T (Japan): lilac
- Development status: Discontinued

The Redmi Note 10 is a line of Android-based smartphones as part of the Redmi Note series by Redmi, a sub-brand of Xiaomi Inc. This series were introduced in March 2021 in most regions including India and May 2021 in China. It succeeds the Redmi Note 9 series of smartphones, which were introduced in 2020.

In some markets, Redmi Note 10 5G is marketed as the Poco M3 Pro and Redmi Note 10T 5G. In Russia, the Redmi Note 10 5G was sold as the Redmi Note 10T without 5G support. The Redmi Note 10 JE (Japan Edition) was introduced for the Japanese market and it has similar specifications to the Redmi Note 10 5G but with a different processor, battery and the addition of IP68 water resistance. The Japanese Redmi Note 10T has mostly the same specifications as the Redmi Note 10 JE but with different camera setup, design, battery capacity as Note 10 5G and eSIM support. On May 24, 2022, Xiaomi introduced the Redmi Note 11SE which have same specifications as the Chinese Redmi Note 10 5G, but with the design similar to the Poco M3 Pro.

The Redmi Note 10 Pro 5G is marketed as the Poco X3 GT for the global market.

In 2022 the Redmi Note 10S was reintroduced in India as the Redmi Note 11 SE (not to be confused with the Chinese Redmi Note 11SE) and as the Poco M5s for the global market. The Redmi Note 11 SE does not have an in-box charger and Poco M5s has a slightly different design.

== Specifications ==
=== Design and build ===
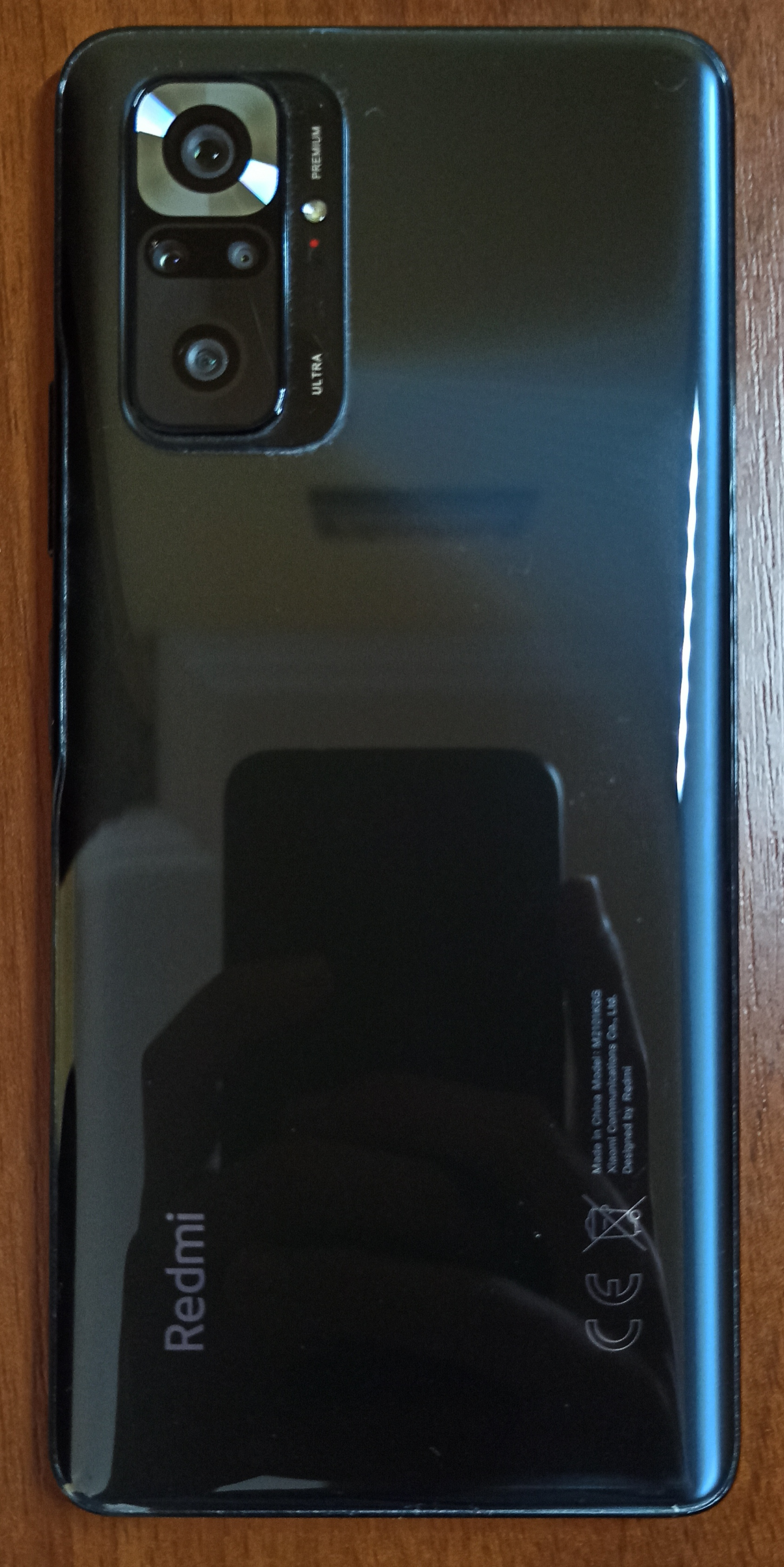
The back of the Redmi Note 10 Pro in Onyx Gray

Redmi Note 10 is available in three colors; Shadow Black (Onyx Gray), Frost White (Pebble White) and Aqua Green (Lake Green). It has a plastic back and Corning Gorilla Glass 3-protected front with rounded edges and a curved body.

Talking about the phone’s dimensions, its height is 160.46 mm, width is 74.5 mm, and thickness is 8.29 mm. As mentioned earlier, its overall weight is 188.8 grams. We can easily find that its dimensions are at better parity with other competitors in the market.

=== Display ===
Standard models of the phone are fitted with a 6.43' display, while pro variants come with a 6.67' display. The screen brightness of the phone is 700 nits, with peak brightness up to 1100 nits (1200 nits for Pro Models). Furthermore, it has a Pixel Density of 409 PPI, while the contrast ratio is about 4,500,000:1. Additionally, The screen-to-body ratio is around 83.5%.

The phone has 16 million 8-bit display colors and an HD+ (1080 by 2000 pixel) resolution. Moreover, the refresh rate is fixed at 60 Hz. The Samsung's E2 Pro Super AMOLED Panel covers the DCI-P3 color gamut.

=== Performance ===
Variations of the Redmi note 10 are offered with 4 GB and 6 GB Of LPDDR4X RAM.

Coming towards the phone’s hardware, it has Qualcomm Snapdragon 678 chipset, coupled with Qualcomm Adreno 612 GPU. Moreover, it has a 64-bit architecture and an AnTuTu score of 238,519. This AnTuTu score is very good compared to other phones of the same category.

=== Camera ===
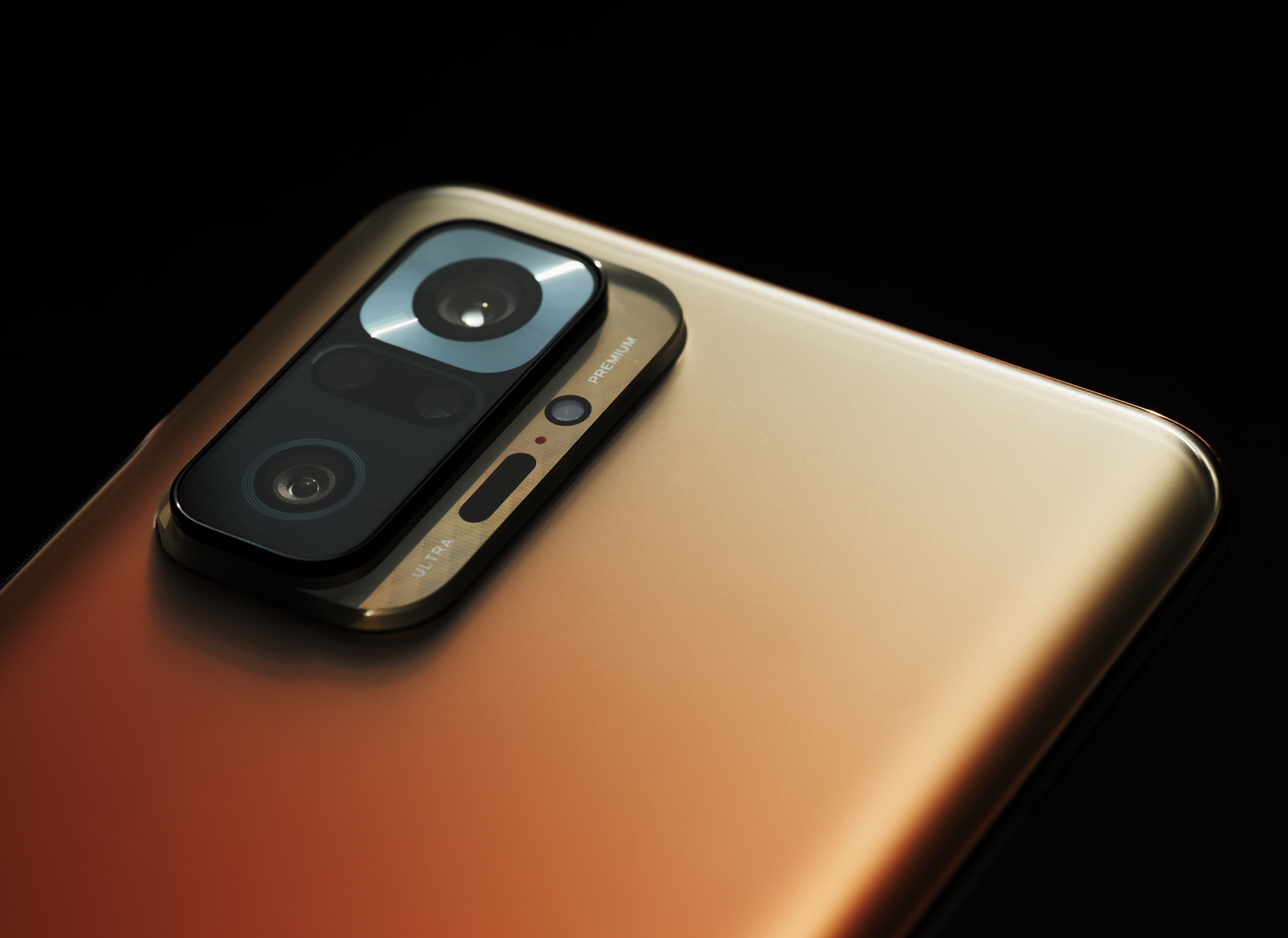
The camera of the Redmi Note 10 Pro in Gradient Bronze

==== Rear camera ====
Redmi Note 10 equipped with a rear quad camera setup. The quad camera consists of a 48 MP wide-angle camera, 8 MP ultra-wide camera, 2 MP macro sensor and a 2 MP depth sensor. The rear camera provides an image resolution of 8000×6000 pixels. Moreover, it can record 4k videos as well.

==== Front camera ====
Xiaomi has provided a single 13 MP front camera in the Redmi Note 10. It provides an image resolution of 4128×3096 pixels and has an aperture of f/2.45, covering a large area. Some notable photography features of this camera include Timed burst, AI Beautify, AI portrait mode with bokeh and depth control, Face detection and HDR. Moreover, the front camera can record HD videos as well.

=== Comparison table ===
Variants	Redmi Note 10	Redmi Note 10S Redmi Note 11 SE Poco M5s	Redmi Note 10 5G Redmi Note 10T Poco M3 Pro Redmi Note 11SE	Redmi Note 10 JE	Redmi Note 10T (Japan)	Redmi Note 10 Pro (India)	Redmi Note 10 Pro (Global) Redmi Note 10 Pro Max	Redmi Note 10 Pro 5G Poco X3 GT
Processor	Qualcomm Snapdragon 678	MediaTek Helio G95	MediaTek Dimensity 700	Qualcomm Snapdragon 480		Qualcomm Snapdragon 732G		MediaTek Dimensity 1100
Battery	5000 mAh			4800 mAh	5000 mAh	5020 mAh		5000 mAh
Rear camera	48 MP	64 MP	48 MP		50 MP	64 MP	108 MP	64 MP
Ultra-wide angle camera	8 MP		None			8 MP		
Depth sensor camera	2 MP							None
Macro camera	2 MP		2 MP (Global and India)	2 MP	None	5 MP		2 MP
Front camera	13 MP		8 MP			16 MP		
NFC	No	Yes (Global)		Yes		No	Yes (Global)	Yes

== Critical response ==
Notebookcheck gave the Redmi Note 10 Pro 84 out of 100 and termed it a midrange game changer. Its display, in particular, was praised while the lack of 5G support was considered a weak point. GSMArena praised its display and main camera. TechRadar gave it 4.5 out of 5 and praised its display, camera, battery life and low price. Giving it 4 out 5, the Android Authority writes, "Redmi Note 10 Pro scores well thanks to its user-friendly design, responsive display, and solid battery performance."
