= Redmi 12C =

Android smartphone made by Xiaomi

Redmi 12C Poco C55
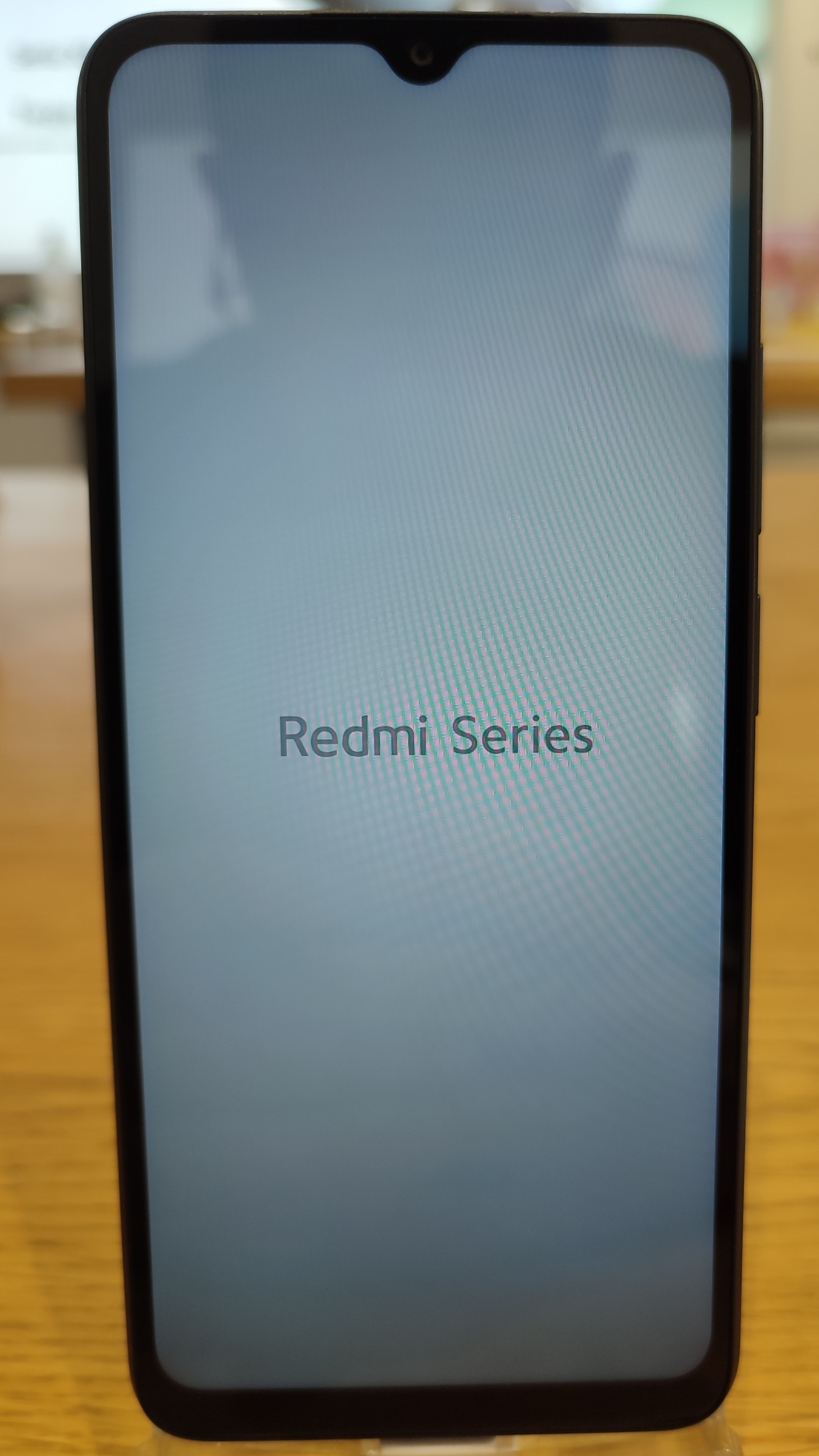
- The front of the Redmi 12C
- Brand: Redmi/Poco
- Manufacturer: Xiaomi
- Type: Phablet
- Series: Redmi/Poco C
- First released: 12C: 31 December 2022; 3 years ago Poco C55: 21 February 2023; 3 years ago
- Predecessor: Redmi 10C; Redmi 10A
- Successor: Redmi 13C
- Related: Redmi 12; Poco C50; Poco C51
- Compatible networks: GSM / CDMA / HSPA / EVDO / LTE
- Form factor: Slate
- Colors: 12C: Graphite Gray/Shadow Black, Ocean Blue/Dark Blue, Mint Green, Lavender Purple; Poco C55: Power Black, Cool Blue, Forest Green
- Dimensions: 168.76 mm (6.644 in) H 76.41 mm (3.008 in) W 8.77 mm (0.345 in) D
- Weight: 192 g (6.8 oz)
- Operating system: Initial: 12C: Android 12 + MIUI 13; Poco C55: Android 12 + MIUI 13 for Poco; Current: Android 14 + Xiaomi HyperOS
- System-on-chip: MediaTek Helio G85 (12nm)
- CPU: Octa-core (2x2.0 GHz Cortex-A75 & 6x1.8 GHz Cortex-A55)
- GPU: Mali-G52 MC2
- Memory: 3 and 4 and 6 GB RAM
- Storage: 32, 64, 128 GB eMMC 5.1
- Removable storage: MicroSDXC up to 512 GB
- SIM: Dual SIM (Nano-SIM, dual stand-by)
- Battery: Non-removable, Li-Po 5000 mAh
- Charging: 10W
- Rear camera: 50 MP, f/1.8, (wide), 1/2.76", PDAF; 0.08 MP (depth); LED flash, HDR; 1080p@30fps
- Front camera: 5 MP, f/2.2, (wide); 1080p@30fps
- Display: 6.71 in (170 mm); 720 × 1650 px resolution (~268 ppi density)
- Sound: Loudspeakers, speakerphone, 3.5 mm Audio
- Connectivity: MicroUSB 2.0, Bluetooth 5.0 (Poco C55)/5.1 (Redmi 12C) (A2DP, LE), FM radio, Wi-Fi 802.11 a/b/g/n/ac (dual-band, Wi-Fi Direct, hotspot), GPS, A-GPS, GLONASS, Galileo, Beidou, QZSS (Poco C55)
- Data inputs: Multi-touch screen; USB Type-C 2.0; Fingerprint scanner; Accelerometer; Proximity sensor
- Model: 12C: 22120RN86C, 22120RN86G, 2212ARNC4L, 22120RN86H, 22126RN91Y; Poco C55: 22127PC95I
- Codename: 12C/Poco C55: earth 12C (NFC): aether
- Other: Fingerprint scanner (on the back), accelerometer, virtual proximity sensor
- Website: https://www.mi.com/global/product/redmi-12c/

The Redmi 12C is an Android-based smartphone as part of the Redmi series, a sub-brand that was manufactued and designed by Xiaomi Inc. with the same name. It was announced on December 31, 2022 and served as a predecessor of the Redmi 13C.

On February 21, 2023, the Poco C55 was introduced in India, which differs from the Redmi 12C in the design of the back panel.

== Design ==
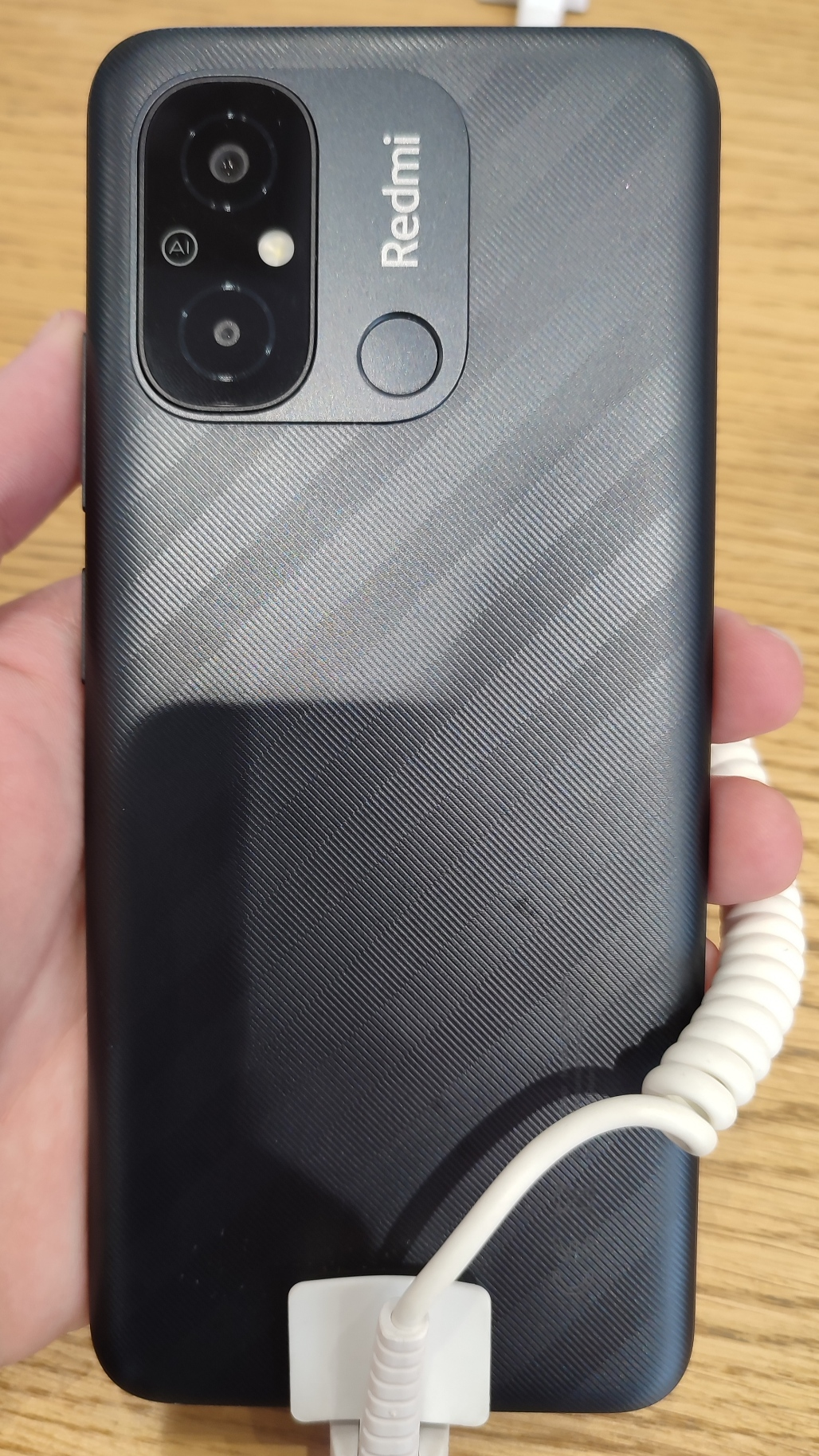
Rear panel of Redmi 12C in Graphite Gray color

The screen is made of glass, while the body is made of plastic with a ribbed texture that forms striped patterns on the Redmi 12C and with a leather-like texture on the Poco C55.

The fingerprint sensor of the Redmi 12C, like its predecessor's, is located in the camera island, but this time the area has the same color as the body and the area with the cameras resembles that of the Redmi 11 Prime.

The Poco C55 has a signature black area for almost the entire width of the back with a logo and a fingerprint sensor.

The microUSB port, unlike the USB-C of its predecessor, speaker and microphone are located below. On top is a 3.5 mm audio jack. On the left side, there is a tray for 2 SIM cards and a microSD format memory card up to 512 GB. On the right side, there is the volume rocker and power button. The fingerprint scanner is located on the back panel.

The smartphones were sold in the following color options:

| Redmi 12C | | Poco C55 | |
| Color | Name | Color | Name |
|---|---|---|---|
| | Graphite Grey/Shadow Black | | Power Black |
| | Ocean Blue/Dark Blue | | Cool Blue |
| | Mint Green | | Forest Green |
| | Lavender Purple | | |

== Specifications ==
=== Platform ===
The devices were equipped by a MediaTek processor Helio G85 and a Mali-G52 MC2 GPU.

=== Battery ===
The battery received a capacity of 5000 mAh.

=== Camera ===
Smartphones have a rear dual camera with a 50 MP, f/1.8 wide-angle lens with PDAF and a VGA auxiliary sensor, and a front 5 MP, f/2.2 wide-angle camera. The main and front cameras can record in resolution 1080p resolution at 30fps.

=== Screen ===
The Redmi 12C and Poco C55 feature a 6.71-inch with IPS LCD technology at HD+ (1650 × 720) resolution, a pixel density of 268 ppi, an aspect ratio of 20.6:9, and a waterdrop notch.

=== Memory ===
The Redmi 12C was sold in 3/64, 4/64, 4/128 and 6/128 GB configurations, while the Poco C55 was sold in 4/64 and 6/128 GB configurations.

=== Software ===
The Redmi 12C was released with MIUI 13 and the Poco C55 was released with MIUI 13 for Poco. Both user interfaces are based on Android 12. The phones later were updated to Xiaomi HyperOS based on Android 14.
