= Redmi 15C =

Android smartphone manufactured by Redmi

Redmi 15C / POCO C85 Redmi 15C 5G / POCO C85 5G Redmi 15R
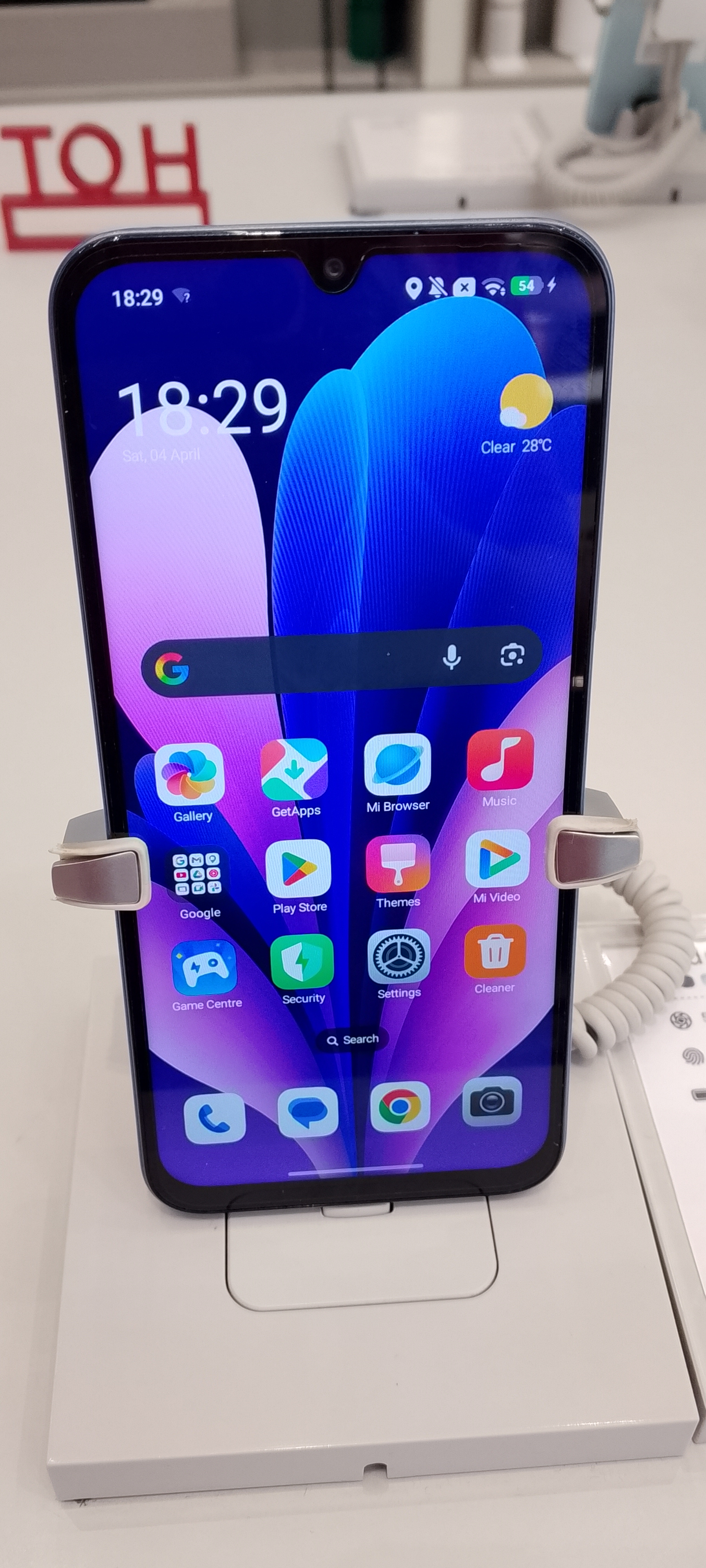
- Front panel of Redmi 15C in Moonlight Blue
- Brand: Redmi / POCO
- Manufacturer: Xiaomi
- Type: Phablet
- Series: Redmi / POCO C series
- First released: 15C: August 1, 2025; 13 months ago 15C 5G: September 18, 2025; 12 months ago 15R: September 17, 2025; 12 months ago POCO C85: September 1, 2025; 12 months ago POCO C85 5G: December 9, 2025; 9 months ago
- Availability by region: Redmi 15C: Philippines: September 11, 2025; Poco C85 5G: India: December 9, 2025
- Predecessor: Redmi 14C
- Related: Redmi 15; Redmi 15A
- Compatible networks: 15C / POCO C85: GSM, 3G, 4G (LTE); 15C 5G / 15R / POCO C85 5G: GSM, 3G, 4G (LTE), 5G
- Form factor: Slate
- Colors: 15C: Midnight Black; Mint Green; Twilight Orange; Moonlight Blue; 15C 5G: Midnight Black; Mint Green; Dusk Purple; Moonlight Blue; 15R: Star Rock Black; Lime Green; Dusk Purple; Misty White; POCO C85: Black; Purple; Green; POCO C85 5G: Power Black; Mystic Purple; Spring Green
- Dimensions: 15C / 15R / POCO C85: H: 171.56 mm; W: 79.47 mm; D: 7.99 mm; 15C 5G / POCO C85 5G: H: 173.16 mm; W: 81.07 mm; D: 8.2 mm
- Weight: 15C / 15R / POCO C85: 204 g 15C 5G / POCO C85 5G: 211 g
- Operating system: Initial: Android 15 + HyperOS 2.2; Current: Android 16 + HyperOS 3.1
- System-on-chip: 15C / POCO C85: MediaTek Helio G81 Ultra (12 nm); 15C 5G / 15R / POCO C85 5G: MediaTek Dimensity 6300 (6 nm)
- CPU: 15C / POCO C85: Octa-core (2×2 GHz Cortex-A75 & 6×1.8 GHz Cortex-A55); 15C 5G / 15R / POCO C85 5G: Octa-core (2×2.4 GHz Cortex-A76 & 6×2 GHz Cortex-A55)
- GPU: 15C / POCO C85: Mali-G52 MC2; 15C 5G / 15R / POCO C85 5G: Mali-G57 MC2
- Memory: 15C / 15C 5G / POCO C85 5G: 4 / 6 / 8 GB; 15R: 4 / 6 / 8 / 12 GB; POCO C85: 6 / 8 GB; LPDDR4X
- Storage: 128 / 256 GB; 15C / POCO C85: eMMC 5.1; 15C 5G / POCO C85 5G: UFS 2.2
- Removable storage: MicroSDXC up to 1 TB
- SIM: Dual SIM (Nano-SIM)
- Battery: Non-removable, 6000 mAh
- Charging: 33 W fast charging, Power Delivery; 10 W reverse wired charging
- Rear camera: 15C / 15C 5G / POCO C85 / C85 5G: 50 MP, f/1.8, 26 mm (wide), 1/2.76", 0.64 µm, PDAF + auxiliary lens 15R: 13 MP (wide), PDAF + auxiliary lens LED flash, HDR; Video: 1080p@30fps
- Front camera: 15C / 15C 5G / POCO C85 / C85 5G: 8 MP, f/2.0 (wide), 1/4", 1.12 µm 15R: 5 MP; HDR; Video: 1080p@30fps
- Display: IPS LCD, 120 Hz, 6.9", 1600 × 720 (HD+), 20:9 ratio, 254 ppi
- Sound: Mono sound
- Connectivity: USB-C 2.0 (OTG), 3.5 mm audio jack, Bluetooth 5.4 (A2DP, LE), FM radio, NFC (except 15R / POCO C85 5G; market/region dependent for 15C / 15C 5G / POCO C85); Wi-Fi 802.11 a/b/g/n/ac (dual-band); Satellite navigation: GPS (A-GPS), GLONASS, Galileo, BeiDou
- Data inputs: Touchscreen (Multi-touch), microphone, side-mounted fingerprint scanner (integrated into power button), accelerometer, compass
- Water resistance: IP64
- Model: 15C: 25078RA3EA, 25078RA3EL, 25078RA3EY; 15C 5G: 2508CRN2BE, 2508CRN2BC, 2508CRN2BG; 15R: 25082RNC1C; POCO C85: 25078PC3EG, 25078PC3EE; POCO C85 5G: 2508CPC2BI
- Codename: 15C / POCO C85: dew 15C 5G / 15R / POCO C85 5G: tornado

The Redmi 15C and Redmi 15C 5G (stylized as REDMI 15C and REDMI 15C 5G respectively) are entry-level Android smartphones developed, marketed, and design by Redmi under its Xiaomi brand. They were introduced on August 1 and September 18, 2025, respectively. The main differences between the models are the processor, storage technology, and physical dimensions. On September 17, 2025, the Redmi 15R was announced in China, sharing very similar features to the Redmi 15C 5G with the primary difference being a downgraded camera system.

In several markets, the POCO C85 and POCO C85 5G are available alongside the Redmi models, featuring a unique rear panel design style while sharing identical technical specifications.

== Design ==
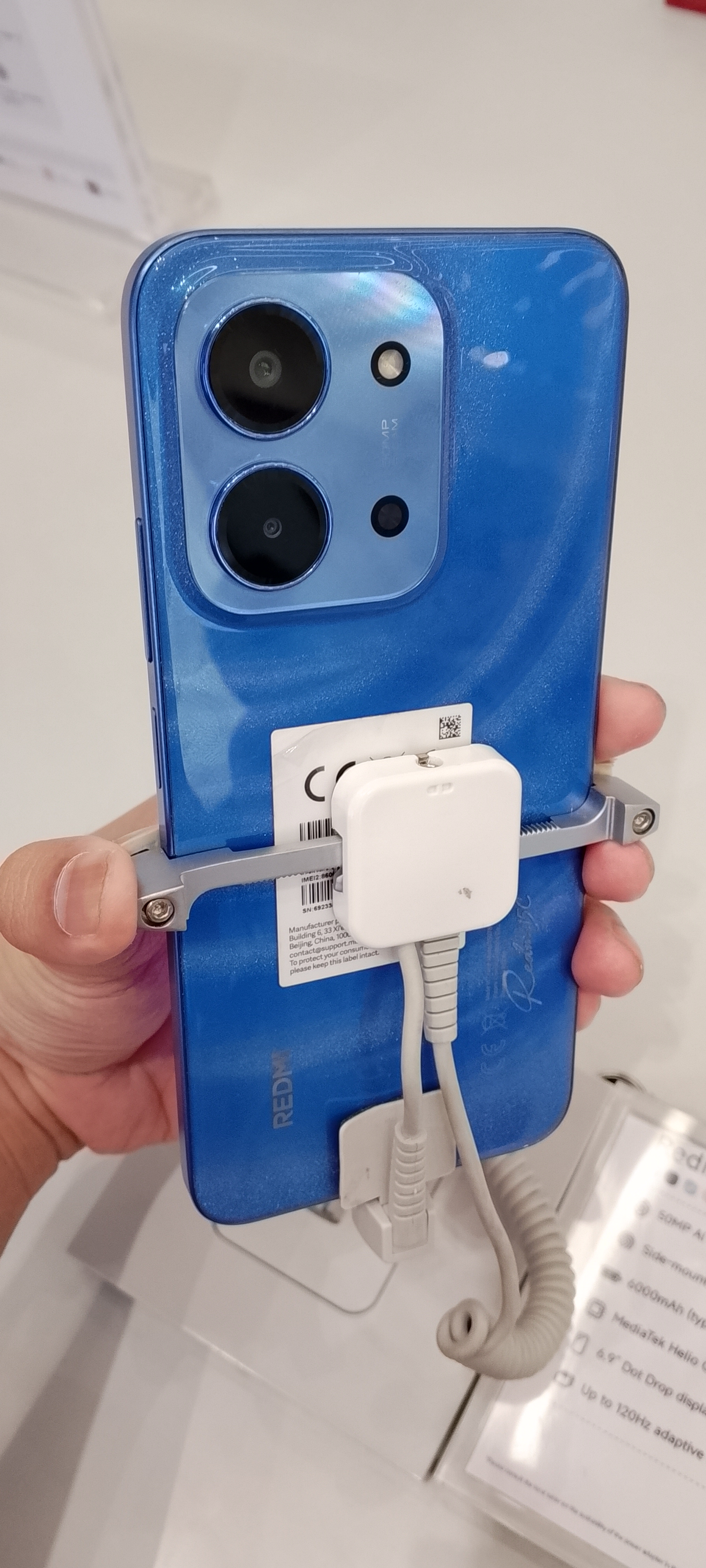
Rear panel of the Redmi 15C in Moonlight Blue

The front panel is made of Corning Gorilla Glass 3, while the back panel and chassis frame are constructed out of plastic. The devices feature ingress protection rated at IP64.

Externally, the Redmi 15C series primarily differs from the POCO C85 series by the camera island configuration (matching the body color with protruding camera rings on the Redmi 15C variants, versus a completely flat black module accent on the POCO C85 variants).

The bottom houses a 3.5 mm audio jack, microphone, USB-C interface, and a speaker. The left side contains a card tray slot for 2 SIM cards and a MicroSD expansion card supporting up to 1 TB. The right side contains the volume rocker and the power standby button, which integrates a capacitive fingerprint sensor.

The smartphones are available in the following color options:

Redmi 15C		Redmi 15C 5G		Redmi 15R		POCO C85		POCO C85 5G	
Color	Name	Color	Name	Color	Name	Color	Name	Color	Name
	Midnight Black		Midnight Black		Star Rock Black		Black		Power Black
	Mint Green		Mint Green		Lime Green		Green		Spring Green
	Twilight Orange		Dusk Purple		Dusk Purple		Purple		Mystic Purple
	Moonlight Blue		Moonlight Blue		Misty White				

== Specifications ==
=== Hardware ===
The Redmi 15C and POCO C85 are powered by the MediaTek Helio G81 Ultra system on a chip, carried over from older generations. Conversely, the Redmi 15C 5G, Redmi 15R, and POCO C85 5G incorporate the 6 nm MediaTek Dimensity 6300 platform.

=== Battery ===
The models carry a 6000 mAh internal cell capacity. They support up to 33 W fast charging speeds and up to 10 W reverse wired charging.

=== Camera ===
The Redmi 15R features a 13 MP primary wide-angle lens utilizing phase-detection autofocus (PDAF). All other models are equipped with a 50 MP main sensor featuring an aperture of f/1.8 alongside PDAF. The secondary rear optics array includes an auxiliary depth lens used for creating a Bokeh background effect. Additionally, the Redmi 15R uses a 5 MP front camera, whereas all other variants feature an 8 MP selfie lens with an aperture of f/2.0.

Both front and rear setups support video recording up to 1080p resolution at 30 frames per second.

=== Display ===
The display configuration is a 6.9-inch IPS LCD panel featuring an HD+ resolution (1600 × 720) with a 20:9 native aspect ratio, a pixel density of 254 ppi, a refresh rate of 120 Hz, and a waterdrop notch hosting the front camera.

=== Storage and memory ===
The smartphones are offered in the following configuration setups:

Configuration		Model				
Storage	RAM	Redmi 15C	Redmi 15C 5G	Redmi 15R	POCO C85	POCO C85 5G
128 GB	4 GB	Yes	Yes	Yes	No	Yes
128 GB	6 GB	Yes	Yes	Yes	Yes	Yes
128 GB	8 GB	Yes	Yes	Yes	No	Yes
256 GB	4 GB	Yes	Yes	No	No	No
256 GB	8 GB	Yes	Yes	Yes	Yes	Yes
256 GB	12 GB	No	No	Yes	No	No

The base Redmi 15C and POCO C85 feature eMMC 5.1 flash storage technology, while all 5G variants and the 15R use faster UFS 2.2 storage modules.

=== Software ===
The devices launched with the pre-installed HyperOS 2 based on Android 15 operating system and were subsequently upgraded to HyperOS 3 running on Android 16.

== Reception ==
UnboxPH reviewer Duey Guison noticed camera similarity from the 14C with overexposure in indoor lighting situations. It was also criticized for its low graphic gaming like Genshin Impact due to low frame rate.

Preceded by Redmi 14C	Redmi 15C / 15C 5G; 2025	Succeeded by —
Preceded by POCO C75 / C75 5G	POCO C85 / C85 5G; 2025	Succeeded by —
