= Poco (smartphone) =

Chinese smartphone brand by Xiaomi

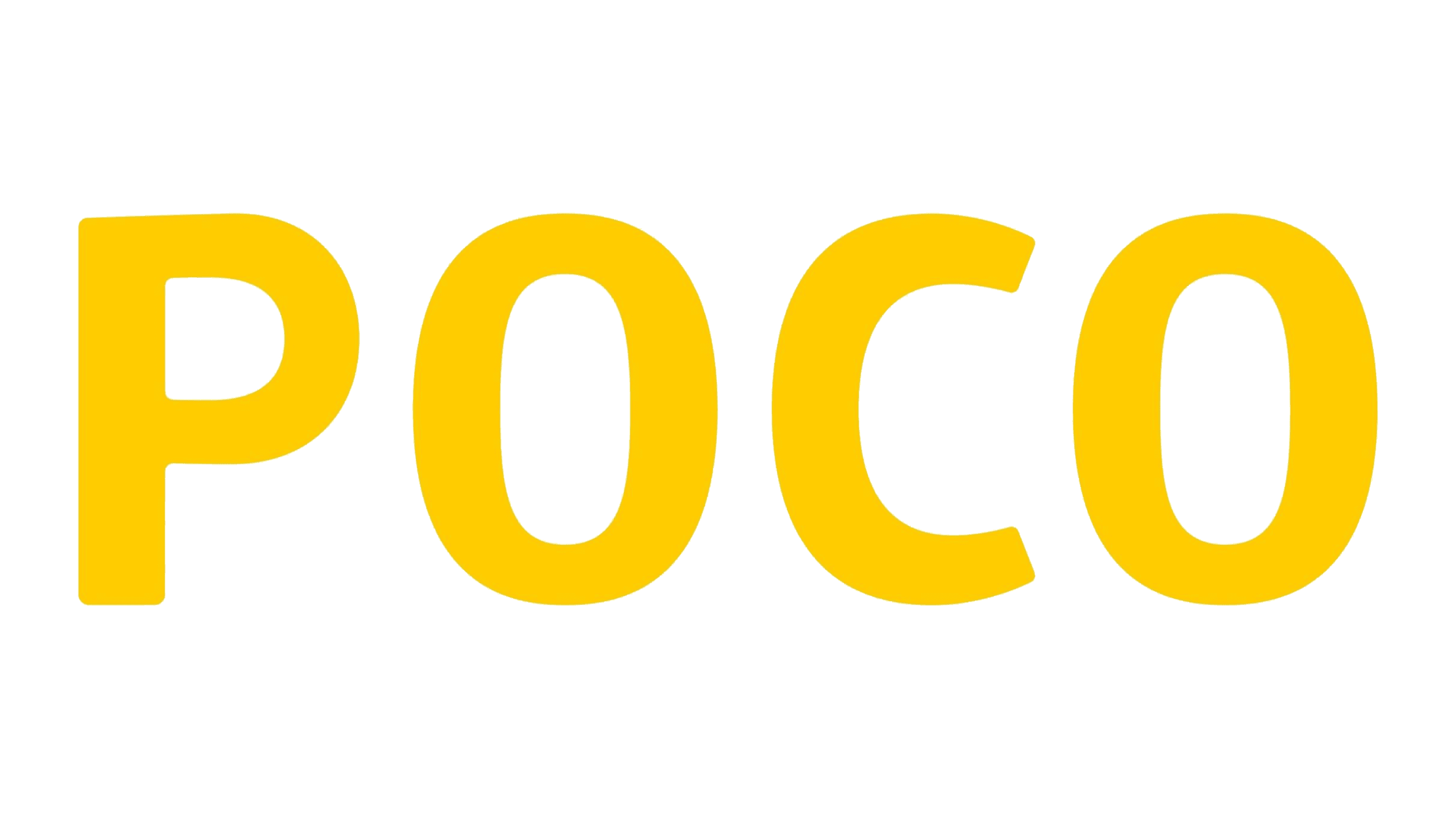
- Type: Division
- Industry: Consumer electronics
- Founded: August 2018; 8 years ago (as a sub-brand of Xiaomi); As an independent brand 17 January 2020; 6 years ago (India); 24 November 2020; 5 years ago (Global)
- Area served: Worldwide
- Products: Smartphones; Headphones; Smartwatches
- Parent: Xiaomi
- Website: po.co/global (Global) poco.in (India)

Poco (stylized in all caps as POCO), formerly known as Poco by Xiaomi or Pocophone by Xiaomi is a Chinese brand owned by Xiaomi that specialises in smartphones. The Poco brand was first announced in August 2018 as a mid-range smartphone line under Xiaomi. Poco India became an independent brand on 17 January 2020, followed by its global counterpart on 24 November 2020. Poco released its first smartphone, the Pocophone F1 in August 2018.

== History ==
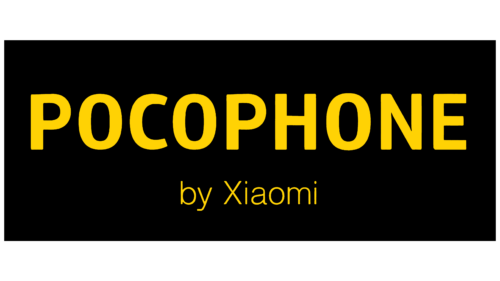
The first POCO logo, that was used until 25 February 2021.

The Poco brand was launched as a Xiaomi sub-brand in August 2018. The Poco sub-brand had a small team within Xiaomi, and chose the name Poco as it represented the team since "poco" means "a little" in Spanish and Italian. Xiaomi introduced the Pocophone F1 under the Poco branding which became a success. Poco India became an independent brand before the launch of its second device in January 2020. During the span of 3 years, the brand launched 11 devices, most of them are rebranded Redmi smartphones.

In January 2021, Poco India introduced its new mascot and slogan Made of Mad.

== Smartphones ==
=== Poco F Series ===
Model	Codename	Model number	Release date	Display type	Display size	Display resolution	5G support	SoC	GPU	RAM	Internal Storage	Camera		Battery	Operating system		Colours
Model	Codename	Model number	Release date	Display type	Display size	Display resolution	5G support	SoC	GPU	RAM	Internal Storage	Rear	Front	Battery	Initial	Latest	Colours
Pocophone F1 India: Poco F1	beryllium	M1805E10A; Poco F1	August 2018	IPS LCD Corning Gorilla Glass 4	6.18"	1080 x 2246 px (Full HD+, ~403 ppi)	No	Qualcomm Snapdragon 845 4x 2.8 GHz + 4x 1.8 GHz	Adreno 630 @710 MHz	6 GB; 8 GB (LPDDR4X)	64 GB; 128 GB; 256 GB (UFS 2.1)	12 MP, f/1.9 + 5 MP, f/2.0 (depth)	20 MP, f/2.0	4000 mAh (Li-Po)	Android 8.1 (MIUI 9 for Poco)	Android 10 (MIUI 12 for Poco)	Graphite Black, Steel Blue, Rosso Red, Armored Edition
Poco F2 Pro China: Redmi K30 Pro	lmi	M2004J11G	May 2020	Super AMOLED Corning Gorilla Glass 5	6.67"	1080 x 2400 px (Full HD+, ~395 ppi)	Yes	Qualcomm Snapdragon 865 1x 2.84 GHz + 3x 2.42 GHz + 4x 1.80 GHz	Adreno 650 @587 MHz	6 GB (LPDDR4X) 8 GB (LPDDR5)	128 GB (UFS 3.0) 256 GB (UFS 3.1)	64 MP, f/1.9 + 5 MP, f/2.2 (telephoto macro) + 13 MP, f/2.4 (ultrawide) + 2 MP, f/2.4 (depth)	20 MP, f/2.2 (Pop-Up)	4700 mAh (Li-Po)	Android 10 (MIUI 11 for Poco)	Android 12 (MIUI 14 for Poco)	Neon Blue, Phantom White, Electric Purple, Cyber Gray
Poco F3 China: Redmi K40	alioth	M2012K11AG	March 2021	AMOLED, 120 Hz Corning Gorilla Glass 5	6.67"	1080 x 2400 px (Full HD+, ~395 ppi)	Yes	Qualcomm Snapdragon 870 1x 3.2 GHz + 3x 2.42 GHz + 4x 1.80 GHz	Adreno 650 @670 MHz	6 GB; 8 GB (LPDDR5)	128 GB; 256 GB (UFS 3.1)	48 MP, f/1.8 + 8 MP, f/2.2 (ultrawide) + 5 MP, f/2.4 (macro)	20 MP, f/2.5	4520 mAh (Li-Po)	Android 11 (MIUI 12 for Poco)	Android 13 (Xiaomi HyperOS)	Arctic White, Night Black, Deep Ocean Blue, Moonlight Silver
Poco F3 GT China: Redmi K40 Gaming	ares	MZB09C6IN; M2104K10I	July 2021	AMOLED, 120 Hz Corning Gorilla Glass 5	6.67"	1080 x 2400 px (Full HD+, ~395 ppi)	Yes	MediaTek Dimensity 1200 1x 3.0 GHz Cortex-A78 + 3x 2.6 GHz Cortex-A78 + 4x 2.0 GHz Cortex-A55	Mali-G77 MC9 @886 MHz	6 GB; 8 GB (LPDDR4X)	128 GB; 256 GB (UFS 3.1)	64 MP, f/1.7 + 8 MP, f/2.2 (ultrawide) + 2 MP, f/2.4 (macro)	16 MP	5065 mAh (Li-Po)	Android 11 (MIUI 12.5 for Poco)	Android 13 (Xiaomi HyperOS)	Predator Black, Gunmetal Silver
Poco F4 GT China: Redmi K50G	ingres	21121210G	April 2022	AMOLED, 120 Hz Corning Gorilla Glass Victus	6.67"	1080 x 2400 px (Full HD+, ~395 ppi)	Yes	Qualcomm Snapdragon 8 Gen 1 1x 3.0 GHz Cortex-X2 + 3x 2.5 GHz Cortex-A710 + 4x 1.80 GHz Cortex-A510	Adreno 730 @818 MHz	8 GB; 12 GB (LPDDR5)	128 GB; 256 GB (UFS 3.1)	64 MP, f/1.9 + 8 MP, f/2.2 (ultrawide) + 2 MP, f/2.4 (macro)	20 MP, f/2.4	4700 mAh (Li-Po)	Android 12 (MIUI 13 for Poco)	Android 14 (Xiaomi HyperOS 2)	Stealth Black, Knight Silver, Cyper Yellow
Poco F4 China: Redmi K40S	munch	22021211RG; 22021211RI	June 2022	AMOLED, 120 Hz Corning Gorilla Glass 5, Dolby Vision, HDR 10+	6.67"	1080 x 2400 px (Full HD+, ~395 ppi)	Yes	Qualcomm Snapdragon 870 1x 3.2 GHz + 3x 2.42 GHz + 4x 1.80 GHz	Adreno 650 @670 MHz	6 GB; 8 GB; 12 GB (LPDDR5)	128 GB; 256 GB (UFS 3.1)	64 MP, f/1.8 + 8 MP, f/2.2 (ultrawide) + 2 MP, f/2.4 (macro)	20 MP, f/2.5	4500 mAh (Li-Po)	Android 12 (MIUI 13 for Poco)	Android 14 (Xiaomi HyperOS)	Moonlight Silver, Night Black, Nebula Green
Poco F5 China: Redmi Note 12 Turbo	marble	23049PCD8G	May 2023	AMOLED, 120 Hz Corning Gorilla Glass 5, Dolby Vision, HDR 10+	6.67"	1080 x 2400 px (Full HD+, ~395 ppi)	Yes	Qualcomm Snapdragon 7+ Gen 2 1x 2.91 GHz Cortex-A710 + 3x 2.49 GHz Cortex-A710 + 4x 1.8 GHz Cortex-A510	Adreno 725 @950 MHz	8 GB 12 GB (LPDDR5)	256 GB (UFS 3.1)	64 MP, f/1.8 + 8 MP, f/2.2 (ultrawide) + 2 MP, f/2.4 (macro)	16 MP, f/2.5	5000 mAh (Li-Po)	Android 13 (MIUI 14 for Poco)	Android 15 (Xiaomi HyperOS 3)	Black, Blue, White
Poco F5 China: Redmi Note 12 Turbo	marblein	23049PCD8I	May 2023	AMOLED, 120 Hz Corning Gorilla Glass 5, Dolby Vision, HDR 10+	6.67"	1080 x 2400 px (Full HD+, ~395 ppi)	Yes	Qualcomm Snapdragon 7+ Gen 2 1x 2.91 GHz Cortex-A710 + 3x 2.49 GHz Cortex-A710 + 4x 1.8 GHz Cortex-A510	Adreno 725 @950 MHz	8 GB 12 GB (LPDDR5)	256 GB (UFS 3.1)	64 MP, f/1.8 + 8 MP, f/2.2 (ultrawide) + 2 MP, f/2.4 (macro)	16 MP, f/2.5	5000 mAh (Li-Po)	Android 13 (MIUI 14 for Poco)	Android 15 (Xiaomi HyperOS 3)	Carbon Black, Electric Blue, Snowstorm White
Poco F5 Pro China: Redmi K60	mondrian	23013PC75G	May 2023	AMOLED, 120 Hz Corning Gorilla Glass 5, Dolby Vision, HDR 10+	6.67"	1440 x 3200 px (QHD+, ~526 ppi)	Yes	Qualcomm Snapdragon 8+ Gen 1 1x 3 GHz Cortex-X2 + 3x 2.5 GHz Cortex-A710 + 4x 1.8 GHz Cortex-A510	Adreno 730 @900 MHz	8 GB 12 GB (LPDDR5)	256 GB 512 GB (UFS 3.1)	64 MP, f/1.8 + 8 MP, f/2.2 (ultrawide) + 2 MP, f/2.4 (macro)	16 MP, f/2.5	5160 mAh (Li-Po)	Android 13 (MIUI 14 for Poco)	Android 15 (Xiaomi HyperOS 3)	White, Black
Poco F6 China: Redmi Turbo 3	peridot	24069PC21G 24069PC21I	May 2024	AMOLED, 120 Hz Corning Gorilla Glass Victus, Dolby Vision, HDR 10+	6.67"	2712 x 1220 px (~446 ppi)	Yes	Qualcomm Snapdragon 8s Gen 3 1x 3.0 GHz Cortex-X4 + 4x 2.8 GHz Cortex-A720 + 3x 2.0 GHz Cortex-A520	Adreno 735 @1170 MHz	8 GB 12 GB (LPDDR5X)	256 GB 512 GB (UFS 4.0)	50 MP Sony, f/1.59, OIS + 8 MP Sony, f/2.2 (ultrawide)	20 MP, f/2.2	5000 mAh (Li-Po)	Android 14 (Xiaomi HyperOS)	Android 16 (Xiaomi HyperOS 3.1)	Titanium, Black
Poco F6 Pro China: Redmi K70	vermeer	23113RKC6G	May 2024	AMOLED, 120 Hz Corning Gorilla Glass 5, Dolby Vision, HDR 10+	6.67"	1440 x 3200 px (QHD+, ~526 ppi)	Yes	Qualcomm Snapdragon 8 Gen 2 1x 3.2 GHz Cortex-X3 + 3x 2.5 GHz Cortex-A710 + 3x 2.5 GHz Cortex-A710 + 4x 1.8 GHz Cortex-A510	Adreno 740 @680 MHz	12 GB 16 GB (LPDDR5X)	256 GB 512 GB 1 TB (UFS 4.0)	50 MP, f/1.6 + 8 MP, f/2.2 (ultrawide) + 2 MP, f/2.4 (macro)	16 MP	5000 mAh (Li-Po)	Android 14 (Xiaomi HyperOS)	Android 16 (Xiaomi HyperOS 3.1)	Black, White
Poco F7 China: Redmi Turbo 4 Pro	onyx	25053PC47G; 25053PC47I	June 2025	AMOLED, 120 Hz Corning Gorilla Glass 7i, Dolby Vision, HDR 10+	6.83"	2800 x 1280 px (1.5K, ~447 ppi)	Yes	Qualcomm Snapdragon 8s Gen 4 1x 3.21 GHz Cortex-X4 + 3x 3.01 GHz Cortex-A720 + 2x 2.8 GHz Cortex-A720 + 2x 2.01 GHz Cortex-A520	Adreno 825	12 GB (LPDDR5X)	256 GB; 512 GB (UFS 4.1)	50 MP, f/1.5 (Sony IMX882, OIS) + 8 MP, f/2.2 (ultrawide, OmniVision OV08F)	20 MP, f/2.2 (OmniVision OV20B)	6500 mAh (Li-Po)	Android 15 (Xiaomi HyperOS 2)	Android 16 (Xiaomi HyperOS 3.1)	Phantom Black, Frost White, Cyber Silver Edition
Poco F7 Pro China: Redmi K80	zorn	24117RK2CG	March 2025	AMOLED, 120 Hz Corning Gorilla Glass 5, Dolby Vision, HDR 10+	6.67"	1440 x 3200 px (QHD+, ~526 ppi)	Yes	Qualcomm Snapdragon 8 Gen 3 1x 3.3 GHz + 3x 3.2 GHz + 2x 2.3 GHz + 2x 2.3 GHz	Adreno 750	12 GB 16 GB (LPDDR5X)	256 GB 512 GB (UFS 4.0)	50 MP, f/1.6, OIS + 8 MP, f/2.2 (ultrawide) + 2 MP, f/2.4 (macro)	20 MP, f/2.2	6000 mAh (Li-Po)	Android 15 (Xiaomi HyperOS 2)	Android 16 (Xiaomi HyperOS 3.1)	Black, Blue, Silver
Poco F7 Ultra China: Redmi K80 Pro	miro	24122RKC7G	March 2025	AMOLED, 120 Hz Poco Shield Glass, Dolby Vision, HDR 10+	6.67"	1440 x 3200 px (QHD+, ~526 ppi)	Yes	Qualcomm Snapdragon 8 Elite 1x 4.32 GHz + 3x 3.53 GHz + 4x 1.8 GHz	Adreno 830	16 GB (LPDDR5X)	512 GB 1 TB (UFS 4.0)	50 MP, f/1.6, OIS + 32 MP, f/2.2 (ultrawide) + 50 MP, f/2.4 (telephoto)	32 MP, f/2.0	5300 mAh (Li-Po)	Android 15 (Xiaomi HyperOS 2)	Android 16 (Xiaomi HyperOS 3.1)	Black, White, Violet, Green Championship Edition, Orange Championship Edition
Poco F8 Pro China: Redmi K90	annibale	2510DPC44G	November 2025	AMOLED, 120 Hz Corning Gorilla Glass 7i, Dolby Vision, HDR 10+	6.59"	2510 x 1156 px (1.5K, ~418 ppi)	Yes	Qualcomm Snapdragon 8 Elite 2x 4.32 GHz Oryon + 6x 3.53 GHz Oryon	Adreno 830	12 GB (LPDDR5X)	256 GB 512 GB (UFS 4.0)	50 MP, f/1.6 (Light Fusion 800), OIS + 50 MP, f/2.0 (telephoto 2.5x) + 8 MP, f/2.2 (ultrawide)	20 MP, f/2.2	6210 mAh (Si/C Li-Po)	Android 16 (Xiaomi HyperOS 3)	Android 17 (Xiaomi HyperOS 4)	Black, Blue, White
Poco F8 Ultra China: Redmi K90 Pro Max	myron	25102PCBEG	November 2025	AMOLED LTPO, 120 Hz Poco Shield Glass, Dolby Vision, HDR 10+	6.9"	2608 x 1200 px (1.5K, ~416 ppi)	Yes	Qualcomm Snapdragon 8 Elite Gen 5 2x 4.6 GHz Oryon V3 + 6x 3.62 GHz Oryon V3	Adreno 840	12 GB 16 GB (LPDDR5X)	256 GB 512 GB (UFS 4.1)	50 MP, f/1.7 (Light Fusion 950), OIS + 50 MP, f/2.4 (ultrawide) + 50 MP, f/3.0 (periscope telephoto 5x)	32 MP, f/2.2	6500 mAh (Si/C Li-Po)	Android 16 (Xiaomi HyperOS 3)	Android 17 (Xiaomi HyperOS 4)	Black, Denim Blue
Poco F9 Pro China: Redmi K100 Pro	athens	2607APCA5G	September 2026	AMOLED, 185 Hz Corning Gorilla Glass 7i, Dolby Vision, HDR 10+	6.59"	2510 x 1156 px (1.5K, ~419 ppi)	Yes	Qualcomm Snapdragon 8 Elite Gen 5 V Series 2x 4.6 GHz Oryon V3 + 6x 3.62 GHz Oryon V3	Adreno 840	12 GB (LPDDR5X)	256 GB 512 GB (UFS 4.1)	200 MP, f/1.7, OIS + 50 MP, f/2.0 (telephoto 2.5x, OIS) + 8 MP, f/2.3 (ultrawide)	32 MP, f/2.2	6330 mAh (Si/C Li-Ion)	Android 16 (Xiaomi HyperOS 3.1)	Android 16 (Xiaomi HyperOS 3.1)	Black, White, Aurora Green
Poco F9 Ultra China: Redmi K100 Pro Max	songyuan	26077PC53G	September 2026	AMOLED, 185 Hz Corning Gorilla Glass 7i, Dolby Vision, HDR 10+	6.9"	2608 x 1200 px (1.5K, ~416 ppi)	Yes	Qualcomm Snapdragon 8 Elite Gen 5 2x 4.6 GHz Oryon V3 + 6x 3.62 GHz Oryon V3	Adreno 840	12 GB 16 GB (LPDDR5X)	256 GB 512 GB 1 TB (UFS 4.1)	200 MP, f/1.7, OIS + 50 MP, f/3.0 (periscope telephoto 5x, OIS) + 50 MP, f/2.4 (ultrawide)	32 MP, f/2.2	8050 mAh (Si/C Li-Ion)	Android 16 (Xiaomi HyperOS 3.1)	Android 16 (Xiaomi HyperOS 3.1)	Black, Dark Cherry

=== Poco X Series ===
Model	Codename	Model number	Release date	Display type	Display size	Display resolution	5G support	SoC	GPU	RAM	Internal Storage	Camera		Battery	Operating system		Colours
Model	Codename	Model number	Release date	Display type	Display size	Display resolution	5G support	SoC	GPU	RAM	Internal Storage	Rear	Front	Battery	Initial	Latest	Colours
Poco X2; China: Redmi K30	phoenixin	MZB9011IN; MZB9012IN; MZB9013IN; MZB8741IN; MZB8742IN; MZB8743IN; MZB8744IN; MZB8745IN; MZB8746IN	February 2020	IPS LCD, 120 Hz; Corning Gorilla Glass 5	6.67"	1080 x 2400 px (Full HD+, ~395 ppi)	No	Qualcomm Snapdragon 730G; 2x 2.2 GHz Cortex-A76 + 6x 1.8 GHz Cortex-A55	Adreno 618 @825 MHz	6 GB; 8 GB (LPDDR4X)	64 GB; 128 GB; 256 GB (UFS 2.1)	64 MP, f/1.9 + 8 MP, f/2.2 (ultrawide) + 2 MP, f/2.4 (macro) + 2 MP, f/2.4 (depth)	20 MP, f/2.2 + 2 MP, f/2.4 (depth)	4500 mAh (Li-Po)	Android 10 (MIUI 11 for Poco)	Android 11 (MIUI 12.5 for Poco)	Atlantis Blue, Matrix Purple, Phoenix Red
Poco X3 (India)	karna	MZB07Z0IN; MZB07Z1IN; MZB07Z2IN; MZB07Z3IN; MZB07Z4IN; MZB9965IN; M2007J20CI	September 2020	IPS LCD, 120 Hz; Corning Gorilla Glass 5	6.67"	1080 x 2400 px (Full HD+, ~395 ppi)	No	Qualcomm Snapdragon 732G; 2x 2.3 GHz Cortex-A76 + 6x 1.8 GHz Cortex-A55	Adreno 618 @825 MHz	6 GB; 8 GB (LPDDR4X)	64 GB; 128 GB (UFS 2.1)	64 MP, f/1.9 + 13 MP, f/2.2 (ultrawide) + 2 MP, f/2.4 (macro) + 2 MP, f/2.4 (depth)	20 MP, f/2.2	6000 mAh (Li-Po)	Android 10 (MIUI 12 for Poco)	Android 12 (MIUI 13 for Poco)	Cobalt Blue, Shadow Gray
Poco X3 NFC	surya	M2007J20CG; M2007J20CT	September 2020	IPS LCD, 120 Hz; Corning Gorilla Glass 5	6.67"	1080 x 2400 px (Full HD+, ~395 ppi)	No	Qualcomm Snapdragon 732G; 2x 2.3 GHz Cortex-A76 + 6x 1.8 GHz Cortex-A55	Adreno 618 @825 MHz	6 GB; 8 GB (LPDDR4X)	64 GB; 128 GB (UFS 2.1)	64 MP, f/1.9 + 13 MP, f/2.2 (ultrawide) + 2 MP, f/2.4 (macro) + 2 MP, f/2.4 (depth)	20 MP, f/2.2	5160 mAh (Li-Po)	Android 10 (MIUI 12 for Poco)	Android 12 (MIUI 14 for Poco)	Cobalt Blue, Shadow Gray
Poco X3 Pro	vayu (Global)	M2102J20SG	March 2021	IPS LCD, 120 Hz; Corning Gorilla Glass 6	6.67"	1080 x 2400 px (Full HD+, ~395 ppi)	No	Qualcomm Snapdragon 860; 1x 2.96 GHz + 3x 2.42 GHz + 4x 1.80 GHz	Adreno 640 @675 MHz	6 GB; 8 GB (LPDDR4X)	128 GB; 256 GB (UFS 3.1)	48 MP, f/1.8 + 8 MP, f/2.2 (ultrawide) + 2 MP, f/2.4 (macro) + 2 MP, f/2.4 (depth)	20 MP, f/2.2	5160 mAh (Li-Po)	Android 11 (MIUI 12 for Poco)	Android 13 (MIUI 14 for Poco)	Phantom Black, Frost Blue, Metal Bronze
Poco X3 Pro	bhima (India)	M2102J20SI	March 2021	IPS LCD, 120 Hz; Corning Gorilla Glass 6	6.67"	1080 x 2400 px (Full HD+, ~395 ppi)	No	Qualcomm Snapdragon 860; 1x 2.96 GHz + 3x 2.42 GHz + 4x 1.80 GHz	Adreno 640 @675 MHz	6 GB; 8 GB (LPDDR4X)	128 GB; 256 GB (UFS 3.1)	48 MP, f/1.8 + 8 MP, f/2.2 (ultrawide) + 2 MP, f/2.4 (macro) + 2 MP, f/2.4 (depth)	20 MP, f/2.2	5160 mAh (Li-Po)	Android 11 (MIUI 12 for Poco)	Android 13 (MIUI 14 for Poco)	Phantom Black, Frost Blue, Metal Bronze
Poco X3 GT; China: Redmi Note 10 Pro 5G	chopin	21061110AG	July 2021	IPS LCD, 120 Hz; Corning Gorilla Glass Victus	6.6"	1080 x 2400 px (Full HD+, ~399 ppi)	Yes	MediaTek Dimensity 1100; 4x 2.6 GHz Cortex-A78 + 4x 2.0 GHz Cortex-A55	Mali-G77 MC9 @850 MHz	8 GB (LPDDR4X)	128 GB; 256 GB (UFS 3.1)	64 MP, f/1.8 + 8 MP, f/2.2 (ultrawide) + 2 MP, f/2.4 (macro)	16 MP, f/2.5	5000 mAh (Li-Po)	Android 11 (MIUI 12.5 for Poco)	Android 13 (MIUI 14 for Poco)	Stargaze Black, Wave Blue, Cloud White
Poco X4 Pro; Global: Redmi Note 11 Pro 5G India: Redmi Note 11 Pro+ China: Redmi Note 11E Pro	veux_p	2201116PG	March 2022	AMOLED, 120 Hz; Corning Gorilla Glass 5	6.67"	1080 x 2400 px (Full HD+, ~395 ppi)	Yes	Qualcomm Snapdragon 695; 2x 2.2 GHz Cortex-A78 + 6x 1.7 GHz Cortex-A55	Adreno 619 @950 MHz	6 GB; 8 GB (LPDDR4X)	64 GB; 128 GB; 256 GB (UFS 2.2)	108 MP, f/1.9 + 8 MP, f/2.2 (ultrawide) + 2 MP, f/2.4 (telephoto macro)	16 MP, f/2.4	5000 mAh (Li-Po)	Android 11 (MIUI 13 for Poco)	Android 13 (Xiaomi HyperOS)	Poco Yellow, Laser Black, Laser Blue
Poco X4 Pro (India)	peux_p	2201116PI	March 2022	AMOLED, 120 Hz; Corning Gorilla Glass 5	6.67"	1080 x 2400 px (Full HD+, ~395 ppi)	Yes	Qualcomm Snapdragon 695; 2x 2.2 GHz Cortex-A78 + 6x 1.7 GHz Cortex-A55	Adreno 619 @950 MHz	6 GB; 8 GB (LPDDR4X)	64 GB; 128 GB (UFS 2.2)	64 MP, f/1.8 + 8 MP, f/2.2 (ultrawide) + 2 MP, f/2.4 (telephoto macro)	16 MP, f/2.4	5000 mAh (Li-Po)	Android 11 (MIUI 13 for Poco)	Android 13 (Xiaomi HyperOS)	Poco Yellow, Laser Black, Laser Blue
Poco X4 GT; China: Redmi Note 11T Pro; India: Redmi K50i	xaga	22041216G	June 2022	IPS LCD, 144 Hz; Corning Gorilla Glass 5	6.6"	1080 x 2460 px (Full HD+, ~407 ppi)	Yes	MediaTek Dimensity 8100; 4x 2.85 GHz Cortex-A78 + 4x 2.0 GHz Cortex-A55	Mali-G610 MC6	8 GB (LPDDR5)	128 GB; 256 GB (UFS 3.1)	64 MP, f/1.9 + 8 MP, f/2.2 (ultrawide) + 2 MP, f/2.4 (macro)	16 MP, f/2.5	5080 mAh (Li-Po)	Android 12 (MIUI 13 for Poco)	Android 14 (Xiaomi HyperOS 2)	Blue, Black, Silver
Poco X5 5G	moonstone	22101320G; 22101320I	February 2023	AMOLED, 120 Hz; Corning Gorilla Glass 3	6.67"	1080 x 2400 px (Full HD+, ~395 ppi)	Yes	Qualcomm Snapdragon 695; 2x 2.2 GHz Cortex-A78 + 6x 1.7 GHz Cortex-A55	Adreno 619 @950 MHz	6 GB; 8 GB (LPDDR4X)	128 GB; 256 GB (UFS 2.2)	48 MP, f/1.8 + 8 MP, f/2.2 (ultrawide) + 2 MP, f/2.4 (macro)	13 MP, f/2.5	5000 mAh (Li-Po)	Android 12 (MIUI 13 for Poco)	Android 14 (Xiaomi HyperOS)	Blue, Black, Green
Poco X5 Pro; China: Redmi Note 12 Pro Speed	redwood	22101320G	February 2023	AMOLED, 120 Hz; Corning Gorilla Glass 5	6.67"	1080 x 2400 px (Full HD+, ~395 ppi)	Yes	Qualcomm Snapdragon 778G; 1x 2.4 GHz Cortex-A78 + 4x 2.2 GHz Cortex-A78 + 4x 1.9 GHz Cortex-A55	Adreno 642L	6 GB; 8 GB (LPDDR4X)	128 GB; 256 GB (UFS 2.2)	108 MP, f/1.9 + 8 MP, f/2.2 (ultrawide) + 2 MP, f/2.4 (macro)	16 MP, f/2.4	5000 mAh (Li-Po)	Android 12 (MIUI 14 for Poco)	Android 14 (Xiaomi HyperOS 2)	Blue, Black, Yellow
Poco X5 Pro; China: Redmi Note 12 Pro Speed	redwoodin	22101320I	February 2023	AMOLED, 120 Hz; Corning Gorilla Glass 5	6.67"	1080 x 2400 px (Full HD+, ~395 ppi)	Yes	Qualcomm Snapdragon 778G; 1x 2.4 GHz Cortex-A78 + 4x 2.2 GHz Cortex-A78 + 4x 1.9 GHz Cortex-A55	Adreno 642L	6 GB; 8 GB (LPDDR4X)	128 GB; 256 GB (UFS 2.2)	108 MP, f/1.9 + 8 MP, f/2.2 (ultrawide) + 2 MP, f/2.4 (macro)	16 MP, f/2.4	5000 mAh (Li-Po)	Android 12 (MIUI 14 for Poco)	Android 14 (Xiaomi HyperOS 2)	Horizon Blue, Astral Black, POCO Yellow
Poco X6 5G; Redmi Note 13 Pro 5G	garnet	23122PCD1G; 23122PCD1I	January 2024	AMOLED, 120 Hz; Corning Gorilla Glass Victus	6.67"	1220 x 2712 px (1.5K, ~446 ppi)	Yes	Qualcomm Snapdragon 7s Gen 2; 4x 2.4 GHz Cortex-A78 + 4x 1.95 GHz Cortex-A55	Adreno 710	8 GB; 12 GB (LPDDR4X)	256 GB; 512 GB (UFS 2.2)	64 MP, f/1.8 + 8 MP, f/2.2 (ultrawide) + 2 MP, f/2.4 (macro)	16 MP, f/2.5	5000 mAh (Li-Po)	Android 13 (MIUI 14 for Poco)	Android 16 (Xiaomi HyperOS 3.1)	Mirror Black (Black), Snowstorm White (White), Blue
Poco X6 Pro; China: Redmi K70E	duchamp	2311DRK48G; 2311DRK48I	January 2024	AMOLED, 120 Hz; Corning Gorilla Glass 5	6.67"	1220 x 2712 px (1.5K, ~446 ppi)	Yes	MediaTek Dimensity 8300 Ultra; 1x 3.35 GHz Cortex-A715 + 3x 3.2 GHz Cortex-A715 + 4x 2.2 GHz Cortex-A510	Mali-G615 MC6	8 GB; 12 GB (LPDDR5X)	256 GB; 512 GB (UFS 4.0)	64 MP, f/1.7 + 8 MP, f/2.2 (ultrawide) + 2 MP, f/2.4 (macro)	16 MP, f/2.4	5000 mAh (Li-Po)	Android 14 (Xiaomi HyperOS)	Android 16 (Xiaomi HyperOS 3.1)	Spectre Black (Black), POCO Yellow (Yellow), Racing Grey (Grey)
Poco X6 Neo; China: Redmi Note 13R Pro	gold	MZB0GGWIN	March 2024	AMOLED, 120 Hz; Corning Gorilla Glass 5	6.67"	1080 x 2400 px (Full HD+, ~395 ppi)	Yes	MediaTek Dimensity 6080; 2x 2.4 GHz Cortex-A76 + 6x 2.0 GHz Cortex-A55	Mali-G57 MC2	8 GB; 12 GB (LPDDR4X)	128 GB; 256 GB (UFS 2.2)	108 MP, f/1.75 + 2 MP, f/2.4 (depth)	16 MP, f/2.45	5000 mAh (Li-Po)	Android 13 (MIUI 14 for Poco)	Android 15 (Xiaomi HyperOS 3)	Astral Black, Horizon Blue, Martian Orange
Poco X7^{Redmi} ^{Note 14} ^{Pro 5G}	malachite	24095PCADG (Global)	January 2025	AMOLED, 120 Hz; Corning Gorilla Glass 7i, Dolby Vision, HDR 10+	6.67"	1220 x 2712 px (Full HD+, ~446 ppi)	Yes	MediaTek Dimensity 7300 Ultra; 4x 2.5 GHz Cortex-A78 + 4x 2.0 GHz Cortex-A55	Mali-G615 MC2	8GB; 12GB (LPDDR4X)	256 GB; 512 GB^{(UFS 2.2)}	50MP, f/1.5 (wide) + 8MP, f/2.2 (ultrawide) + 2MP, f/2.4 (macro)	20MP, f/2.2	5110 mAh	Android 14 (Xiaomi HyperOS)	Android 16 (Xiaomi HyperOS 3.1)	Black, Green, Silver
Poco X7^{Redmi} ^{Note 14} ^{Pro 5G}	malachite	24095PCADI (India)	January 2025	AMOLED, 120 Hz; Corning Gorilla Glass 7i, Dolby Vision, HDR 10+	6.67"	1220 x 2712 px (Full HD+, ~446 ppi)	Yes	MediaTek Dimensity 7300 Ultra; 4x 2.5 GHz Cortex-A78 + 4x 2.0 GHz Cortex-A55	Mali-G615 MC2	8GB (LPDDR4X)	128 GB; 256 GB^{(UFS 2.2)}	50MP, f/1.5 (wide) + 8MP, f/2.2 (ultrawide) + 2MP, f/2.4 (macro)	20MP, f/2.2	5500 mAh	Android 14 (Xiaomi HyperOS)	Android 16 (Xiaomi HyperOS 3.1)	POCO Yellow, Glacier Green, Cosmic Silver
Poco X7 Pro; China: Redmi Turbo 4	rodin	2412DPC0AG (Global)	January 2025	AMOLED, 120 Hz; Corning Gorilla Glass 7i, Dolby Vision, HDR 10+	6.67"	1220 x 2712 px (Full HD+, ~446 ppi)	Yes	MediaTek Dimensity 8400 Ultra; 1x 3.25 GHz Cortex A-725 + 3× 3.0 GHz Cortex A-725 + 4x 2.1 GHz Cortex A-725	Mali-G720 MC7	8GB; 12GB (LPDDR5X)	256 GB; 512 GB (UFS 4.0)	50MP, f/1.5 (wide) + 8MP f/2.2, (ulrawide)	20MP, f/2.2	6000 mAh (Si/C Li-Ion)	Android 15 (Xiaomi HyperOS 2)	Android 16 (Xiaomi HyperOS 3.1)	Black, Yellow, Green, Iron Man Edition
Poco X7 Pro; China: Redmi Turbo 4	rodin	2412DPC0AI (India)	January 2025	AMOLED, 120 Hz; Corning Gorilla Glass 7i, Dolby Vision, HDR 10+	6.67"	1220 x 2712 px (Full HD+, ~446 ppi)	Yes	MediaTek Dimensity 8400 Ultra; 1x 3.25 GHz Cortex A-725 + 3× 3.0 GHz Cortex A-725 + 4x 2.1 GHz Cortex A-725	Mali-G720 MC7	8GB; 12GB (LPDDR5X)	256GB (UFS 4.0)	50MP, f/1.5 (wide) + 8MP f/2.2, (ulrawide)	20MP, f/2.2	6550 mAh (Si/C Li-Ion)	Android 15 (Xiaomi HyperOS 2)	Android 16 (Xiaomi HyperOS 3.1)	Obsidian Black, POCO Yellow, Nebula Green
Poco X8 Pro; China: Redmi Turbo 5	klee	2604DPC0AG (Global)	March 2026	AMOLED, 120 Hz; Corning Gorilla Glass 7i	6.59"	1268 x 2756 px (1.5K, ~460 ppi)	Yes	MediaTek Dimensity 8500 Ultra; 1x 3.4 GHz Cortex-A725 + 3x 3.2 GHz Cortex-A725 + 4x 2.2 GHz Cortex-A725	Mali-G720 MC8	8 GB; 12 GB (LPDDR5X)	256 GB; 512 GB (UFS 4.1)	50 MP, f/1.5 (wide, OIS) + 8 MP, f/2.2 (ultrawide)	20 MP, f/2.2	6500 mAh (Si/C Li-Ion)	Android 16 (Xiaomi HyperOS 3)	Android 16 (Xiaomi HyperOS 3.1)	Black, Mint Green, White, Yellow, Iron Man Edition Gold
Poco X8 Pro; China: Redmi Turbo 5	klee	2604DPC0AI (India)	March 2026	AMOLED, 120 Hz; Corning Gorilla Glass 7i	6.59"	1268 x 2756 px (1.5K, ~460 ppi)	Yes	MediaTek Dimensity 8500 Ultra; 1x 3.4 GHz Cortex-A725 + 3x 3.2 GHz Cortex-A725 + 4x 2.2 GHz Cortex-A725	Mali-G720 MC8	8 GB; 12 GB (LPDDR5X)	256 GB; 512 GB (UFS 4.1)	50 MP, f/1.5 (wide, OIS) + 8 MP, f/2.2 (ultrawide)	20 MP, f/2.2	6500 mAh (Si/C Li-Ion)	Android 16 (Xiaomi HyperOS 3)	Android 16 (Xiaomi HyperOS 3.1)	Black, Mint Green, White
Poco X8 Pro Max; China: Redmi Turbo 5 Max	dash	2602BPC18G (Global)	March 2026	AMOLED, 120 Hz; Corning Gorilla Glass 7i	6.83"	1280 x 2772 px (1.5K, ~447 ppi)	Yes	MediaTek Dimensity 9500s 1x 3.73 GHz Cortex-X925 + 3x 3.3 GHz Cortex-X4 + 4x 2.4 GHz Cortex-A720	Immortalis-G925 MC11	12 GB (LPDDR5X)	256 GB; 512 GB (UFS 4.1)	50 MP, f/1.5 (wide, OIS) + 8 MP, f/2.2 (ultrawide)	20 MP, f/2.2	8500 mAh (Si/C Li-Ion)9000 mAh (Si/C Li-Ion)	Android 16 (Xiaomi HyperOS 3)	Android 16 (Xiaomi HyperOS 3.1)	Black, White, Blue
Poco X8 Pro Max; China: Redmi Turbo 5 Max	dash	2602BPC18I (India)	March 2026	AMOLED, 120 Hz; Corning Gorilla Glass 7i	6.83"	1280 x 2772 px (1.5K, ~447 ppi)	Yes	MediaTek Dimensity 9500s 1x 3.73 GHz Cortex-X925 + 3x 3.3 GHz Cortex-X4 + 4x 2.4 GHz Cortex-A720	Immortalis-G925 MC11	12 GB (LPDDR5X)	256 GB; 512 GB (UFS 4.1)	50 MP, f/1.5 (wide, OIS) + 8 MP, f/2.2 (ultrawide)	20 MP, f/2.2	9000 mAh (Si/C Li-Ion)	Android 16 (Xiaomi HyperOS 3)	Android 16 (Xiaomi HyperOS 3.1)	Black, White, Blue
Poco X8 Redmi Note 17 Pro	iolite/moscow	2607DPC18G (Global)	September 2026	AMOLED, 120 Hz; Corning Gorilla Glass Victus 2	6.83"	1280 x 2772 px (1.5K, ~447 ppi)	Yes	Qualcomm Snapdragon 6s Gen 4; 4x 2.4 GHz Cortex-A78 + 4x 1.8 GHz Cortex-A55	Adreno 710	6 GB; 8 GB 12 GB (LPDDR4X)	128 GB (UFS 2.2); 256 GB (UFS 3.1)	50MP, f/1.8 (wide, OIS) + 2MP, f/2.4 (depth)	16 MP, f/2.4	8340 mAh (Si/C Li-Ion)9000 mAh (Si/C Li-Ion)	Android 16 (Xiaomi HyperOS 3.1)	Android 16 (Xiaomi HyperOS 3.1)	Black, White, Orange
Poco X8 Redmi Note 17 Pro	iolite/moscow	2607DPC18I (India)	September 2026	AMOLED, 120 Hz; Corning Gorilla Glass Victus 2	6.83"	1280 x 2772 px (1.5K, ~447 ppi)	Yes	Qualcomm Snapdragon 6s Gen 4; 4x 2.4 GHz Cortex-A78 + 4x 1.8 GHz Cortex-A55	Adreno 710	6 GB; 8 GB (LPDDR4X)	128 GB (UFS 2.2); 256 GB (UFS 3.1)	50MP, f/1.8 (wide, OIS) + 2MP, f/2.4 (depth)	16 MP, f/2.4	9000 mAh (Si/C Li-Ion)	Android 16 (Xiaomi HyperOS 3.1)	Android 16 (Xiaomi HyperOS 3.1)	Black, Frost White, Fiery Orange
Poco X8 Power Redmi Note 17 Pro Max	brussels	2609FPC74I	September 2026	AMOLED, 120 Hz; Corning Gorilla Glass Victus 2	6.83"	1280 x 2772 px (1.5K, ~447 ppi)	Yes	Qualcomm Snapdragon 6 Gen 5; 4x 2.6 GHz Cortex-A78 + 4x 2.0 GHz Cortex-A55	Adreno 812	8 GB (LPDDR5X)	128 GB (UFS 2.2); 256 GB (UFS 4.1)	50 MP, f/1.5 (wide, OIS) + 8 MP, f/2.2 (ultrawide)	32 MP, f/2.2	10000 mAh (Si/C Li-Ion)	Android 16 (Xiaomi HyperOS 3.1)	Android 16 (Xiaomi HyperOS 3.1)	Black, Yellow
Poco X8s	darwin	2609CPC5FG	October 2026	LTPO AMOLED, 120 Hz; Corning Gorilla Glass Victus 2	6.35"	1220 x 2656 px (1.5K, ~460 ppi)	Yes	Qualcomm Snapdragon 7 Gen 4; 1x 2.8 GHz Cortex-A720 + 4x 2.4 GHz Cortex-A720 + 3x 1.8 GHz Cortex-A520	Adreno 722	8GB; 12GB (LPDDR4X)	256 GB; 512 GB^{(UFS 2.2)}	50 MP, f/1.8 (Light Fusion 800) (wide, OIS) + 50 MP, f/2.2 (telephoto 2.5x) + 8 MP, f/2.2 (ultrawide)	20 MP	6330 mAh (Si/C Li-Ion)	Android 16 (Xiaomi HyperOS 3.1)	Android 16 (Xiaomi HyperOS 3.1)	Black, White, Blue

=== Poco M Series ===
Model	Codename	Model number	Release date	Display type	Display size	Display resolution	5G support	SoC	GPU	RAM	Internal Storage	Camera		Battery	Operating system		Colours
Model	Codename	Model number	Release date	Display type	Display size	Display resolution	5G support	SoC	GPU	RAM	Internal Storage	Rear	Front	Battery	Initial	Latest	Colours
Poco M2 Pro Global: Redmi Note 9S	gram	MZB9623IN	July 2020	IPS LCD Corning Gorilla Glass 5	6.67"	1080 x 2400 px (Full HD+, ~395 ppi)	No	Qualcomm Snapdragon 720G 2x 2.3 GHz Cortex-A76 + 6x 1.8 GHz Cortex-A55	Adreno 618 @700 MHz	4 GB; 6 GB (LPDDR4X)	64 GB; 128 GB (UFS 2.1)	48 MP, f/1.8 + 8 MP, f/2.2 (ultrawide) + 5 MP, f/2.4 (macro) + 2 MP, f/2.4 (depth)	16 MP, f/2.5	5000 mAh (Li-Po)	Android 10 (MIUI 11 for Poco)	Android 12 (MIUI 14 for Poco)	Out Of The Blue, Green and Greener, Two Shades of Black
Poco M2 Redmi 9 Prime Global: Redmi 9	shiva	MZB9919IN; M2004J19PI	September 2020	IPS LCD Corning Gorilla Glass 3	6.53"	1080 x 2340 px (Full HD+, ~395 ppi)	No	MediaTek Helio G80 2x 2.0 GHz Cortex-A75 + 6x 1.8 GHz Cortex-A55	Mali-G52 MC2 @950 MHz	6 GB (LPDDR4X)	64 GB; 128 GB (eMMC 5.1)	13 MP, f/2.2 + 8 MP, f/2.2 (ultrawide) + 5 MP, f/2.4 (macro) + 2 MP, f/2.4 (depth)	8 MP, f/2.0	5000 mAh (Li-Po)	Android 10 (MIUI 11 for Poco)	Android 12 (MIUI 13 for Poco)	Brick Red, Pitch Black, Slate Blue
Poco M2 Reloaded Redmi 9 Prime Global: Redmi 9	shiva	MZB0957IN	April 2021	IPS LCD Corning Gorilla Glass 3	6.53"	1080 x 2340 px (Full HD+, ~395 ppi)	No	MediaTek Helio G80 2x 2.0 GHz Cortex-A75 + 6x 1.8 GHz Cortex-A55	Mali-G52 MC2 @950 MHz	4 GB (LPDDR4X)	64 GB (eMMC 5.1)	13 MP, f/2.2 + 8 MP, f/2.2 (ultrawide) + 5 MP, f/2.4 (macro) + 2 MP, f/2.4 (depth)	8 MP, f/2.0	5000 mAh (Li-Po)	Android 10 (MIUI 12 for Poco)	Android 12 (MIUI 13 for Poco)	Pitch Black, Slate Blue
Poco M3	citrus	M2010J19CG; M2010J19CI	November 2020	IPS LCD Corning Gorilla Glass 3	6.53"	1080 x 2340 px (Full HD+, ~395 ppi)	No	Qualcomm Snapdragon 662 4x 2.0 GHz Cortex-A73 + 4x 1.8 GHz Cortex-A53	Adreno 610 @750 MHz	4 GB; 6 GB (LPDDR4X)	64 GB (UFS 2.1) 128 GB (UFS 2.2)	48 MP, f/1.8 + 2 MP, f/2.4 (macro) + 2 MP, f/2.4 (depth)	8 MP, f/2.1	6000 mAh (Li-Po)	Android 10 (MIUI 12 for Poco)	Android 12 (MIUI 14 for Poco)	Poco Yellow, Power Black, Cool Blue
Poco M3 Pro 5G Redmi Note 10 5G, Redmi Note 10T, Redmi Note 10T 5G; China: Redmi Note 10 5G, Redmi Note 11SE	camellia	M2103K19PG; M2103K19PI	May 2021	IPS LCD, 90 Hz Corning Gorilla Glass 3	6.5"	1080 x 2400 px (Full HD+, ~405 ppi)	Yes	MediaTek Dimensity 700 2x 2.2 GHz Cortex-A76 + 6x 2.0 GHz Cortex-A55	Mali-G57 MC2 @950 MHz	4 GB; 6 GB (LPDDR4X)	64 GB; 128 GB (UFS 2.2)	48 MP, f/1.8 + 2 MP, f/2.4 (macro) + 2 MP, f/2.4 (depth)	8 MP, f/2.0	5000 mAh (Li-Po)	Android 11 (MIUI 12 for Poco)	Android 13 (MIUI 14 for Poco)	Poco Yellow, Power Black, Cool Blue
Poco M3 Pro 5G Redmi Note 10 5G, Redmi Note 10T, Redmi Note 10T 5G; China: Redmi Note 10 5G, Redmi Note 11SE	camellian (NFC)	M2103K19PY	May 2021	IPS LCD, 90 Hz Corning Gorilla Glass 3	6.5"	1080 x 2400 px (Full HD+, ~405 ppi)	Yes	MediaTek Dimensity 700 2x 2.2 GHz Cortex-A76 + 6x 2.0 GHz Cortex-A55	Mali-G57 MC2 @950 MHz	4 GB; 6 GB (LPDDR4X)	64 GB; 128 GB (UFS 2.2)	48 MP, f/1.8 + 2 MP, f/2.4 (macro) + 2 MP, f/2.4 (depth)	8 MP, f/2.0	5000 mAh (Li-Po)	Android 11 (MIUI 12 for Poco)	Android 13 (MIUI 14 for Poco)	Poco Yellow, Power Black, Cool Blue
Poco M4 Pro 5G Redmi Note 11T China: Redmi Note 11 5G	evergreen	21091116AG; MZB0BGVIN	November 2021	IPS LCD, 90 Hz Corning Gorilla Glass 3	6.6"	1080 x 2400 px (Full HD+, ~399 ppi)	Yes	MediaTek Dimensity 810 2x 2.4 GHz Cortex-A76 + 6x 2.0 GHz Cortex-A55	Mali-G57 MC2 @950 MHz	4 GB; 6 GB; 8 GB (LPDDR4X)	64 GB; 128 GB; 256 GB (UFS 2.2)	50 MP + 8 MP, f/2.2 (ultrawide)	16 MP, f/2.5	5000 mAh (Li-Po)	Android 11 (MIUI 12.5 for Poco)	Android 13 (Xiaomi HyperOS)	Poco Yellow, Power Black, Cool Blue
Poco M4 Pro	miel	MZB0B5VIN; 2201117PI	February 2022	AMOLED, 90 Hz Corning Gorilla Glass 3	6.43"	1080 x 2400 px (Full HD+, ~409 ppi)	No	MediaTek Helio G96 2x 2.05 GHz Cortex-A76 + 6x 2.0 GHz Cortex-A55	Mali-G57 MC2 @850 MHz	6 GB; 8 GB (LPDDR4X)	64 GB; 128 GB; 256 GB (UFS 2.2)	64 MP, f/1.8 + 8 MP, f/2.2 (ultrawide) + 2 MP, f/2.4 (macro)	16 MP, f/2.5	5000 mAh (Li-Po)	Android 11 (MIUI 13 for Poco)	Android 13 (Xiaomi HyperOS)	Poco Yellow, Power Black, Cool Blue
Poco M4 Pro	fleur	2201117PG	February 2022	AMOLED, 90 Hz Corning Gorilla Glass 3	6.43"	1080 x 2400 px (Full HD+, ~409 ppi)	No	MediaTek Helio G96 2x 2.05 GHz Cortex-A76 + 6x 2.0 GHz Cortex-A55	Mali-G57 MC2 @850 MHz	6 GB; 8 GB (LPDDR4X)	64 GB; 128 GB; 256 GB (UFS 2.2)	64 MP, f/1.8 + 8 MP, f/2.2 (ultrawide) + 2 MP, f/2.4 (macro)	16 MP, f/2.5	5000 mAh (Li-Po)	Android 11 (MIUI 13 for Poco)	Android 13 (Xiaomi HyperOS)	Poco Yellow, Power Black, Cool Blue
Poco M4 5G (India) Redmi 11 Prime 5G	light	22041219PI	May 2022	IPS LCD, 90 Hz Corning Gorilla Glass 3	6.58"	1080 x 2400 px (Full HD+, ~400 ppi)	Yes	MediaTek Dimensity 700 2x 2.2 GHz Cortex-A76 + 6x 2.0 GHz Cortex-A55	Mali-G57 MC2 @950 MHz	4 GB; 6 GB (LPDDR4X)	64 GB; 128 GB (UFS 2.2)	50 MP, f/1.8 + 2 MP, f/2.4 (depth)	8 MP, f/2.4 (India)	5000 mAh (Li-Po)	Android 12 (MIUI 13 for Poco)	Android 14 (Xiaomi HyperOS)	Poco Yellow, Power Black, Cool Blue
Poco M4 5G China: Redmi Note 11R	light	22041219PG	August 2022	IPS LCD, 90 Hz Corning Gorilla Glass 3	6.58"	1080 x 2400 px (Full HD+, ~400 ppi)	Yes	MediaTek Dimensity 700 2x 2.2 GHz Cortex-A76 + 6x 2.0 GHz Cortex-A55	Mali-G57 MC2 @950 MHz	4 GB; 6 GB (LPDDR4X)	64 GB; 128 GB (UFS 2.2)	13 MP, f/2.2 + 2 MP, f/2.4 (depth)	5 MP, f/2.2 (Global)	5000 mAh (Li-Po)	Android 12 (MIUI 13 for Poco)	Android 14 (Xiaomi HyperOS)	Poco Yellow, Power Black, Cool Blue
Poco M5 (India) Redmi 11 Prime	rock	22071219CI	September 2022	IPS LCD, 90 Hz Corning Gorilla Glass 3	6.58"	1080 x 2400 px (Full HD+, ~400 ppi)	No	MediaTek Helio G99 2x 2.2 GHz Cortex-A76 + 6x 2.0 GHz Cortex-A55	Mali-G57 MC2 @1 GHz	4 GB; 6 GB (LPDDR4X)	64 GB; 128 GB (UFS 2.2)	50 MP, f/1.8 + 2 MP, f/2.4 (macro) + 2 MP, f/2.4 (depth)	8 MP, f/2.0	5000 mAh (Li-Po)	Android 12 (MIUI 13 for Poco)	Android 14 (Xiaomi HyperOS)	Poco Yellow, Icy Blue, Power Black
Poco M5	rock	22071219CG	September 2022	IPS LCD, 90 Hz Corning Gorilla Glass 3	6.58"	1080 x 2408 px (Full HD+, ~401 ppi)	No	MediaTek Helio G99 2x 2.2 GHz Cortex-A76 + 6x 2.0 GHz Cortex-A55	Mali-G57 MC2 @1 GHz	4 GB; 6 GB (LPDDR4X)	64 GB; 128 GB (UFS 2.2)	50 MP, f/1.8 + 2 MP, f/2.4 (macro) + 2 MP, f/2.4 (depth)	5 MP, f/2.2	5000 mAh (Li-Po)	Android 12 (MIUI 13 for Poco)	Android 14 (Xiaomi HyperOS)	Black, Green, Yellow
Poco M5s Redmi Note 10S	rosemary_p	2207117GCG	September 2022	AMOLED Corning Gorilla Glass 3	6.43"	1080 x 2400 px (Full HD+, ~409 ppi)	No	MediaTek Helio G95 2x 2.05 GHz Cortex-A76 + 6x 2.0 GHz Cortex-A55	Mali-G76 MC4 @900 MHz	4 GB; 6 GB (LPDDR4X)	64 GB; 128 GB (UFS 2.2)	64 MP, f/1.8 + 8 MP, f/2.2 (ultrawide) + 2 MP, f/2.4 (macro) + 2 MP, f/2.4 (depth)	13 MP, f/2.4	5000 mAh (Li-Po)	Android 12 (MIUI 13 for Poco)	Android 13 (MIUI 14 for Poco)	Gray, White, Blue, Yellow
Poco M6 Pro 5G China: Redmi 12R	sky	23076PC4BI	August 2023	IPS LCD, 90 Hz Corning Gorilla Glass	6.79"	1080 x 2460 px (Full HD+, ~396 ppi)	Yes	Qualcomm Snapdragon 4 Gen 2 2x 2.2 GHz Cortex-A78 + 6x 2 GHz Cortex-A55	Adreno 613	4 GB; 6 GB (LPDDR4X)	64 GB; 128 GB (UFS 2.2)	50 MP, f/1.8 + 2 MP, f/2.4 (depth)	8 MP, f/2.0	5000 mAh (Li-Po)	Android 13 (MIUI 14 for Poco)	Android 15 (Xiaomi HyperOS 2.2)	Power Black, Forest Green
Poco M6 5G China: Redmi 13R	air	23128PC33I	December 2023	IPS LCD, 90 Hz Corning Gorilla Glass	6.74"	720 x 1600 px (HD+, ~260 ppi)	Yes	Mediatek Dimensity 6100+ 2x 2.2 GHz Cortex-A76 + 6x 2 GHz Cortex-A55	Mali-G57 MC2 @962 MHz	4 GB; 6 GB; 8 GB (LPDDR4X)	128 GB; 256 GB (UFS 2.2)	50 MP, f/1.8 + VGA (auxiliary lens)	5 MP	5000 mAh (Li-Po)	Android 13 (MIUI 14 for Poco)	Android 15 (Xiaomi HyperOS 2.2)	Orion Blue, Galactic Black
Poco M6 Pro	emerald	2312FPCA6G	January 2024	AMOLED, 120 Hz Corning Gorilla Glass 5	6.67"	1080 x 2400 px (Full HD+, ~395 ppi)	No	MediaTek Helio G99 Ultra 2x 2.2 GHz Cortex-A76 + 6x 2.0 GHz Cortex-A55	Mali-G57 MC2 @1 GHz	8 GB 12 GB (LPDDR4X)	256 GB 512 GB (UFS 2.2)	64 MP, f/1.8 + 8 MP, f/2.2 (ultrawide) + 2 MP, f/2.4 (macro)	16 MP, f/2.5	5000 mAh (Li-Po)	Android 13 (MIUI 14 for Poco)	Android 16 (Xiaomi HyperOS 3.1)	Black, Blue, Purple
Poco M6 Redmi 13/13x	moon	2404APC5FG	June 2024	IPS LCD, 90 Hz Corning Gorilla Glass	6.79"	1080 x 2460 px (Full HD+, ~396 ppi)	No	MediaTek Helio G91 Ultra 2x 2.0 GHz Cortex-A75 + 6x 1.8 GHz Cortex-A55	Mali-G52 MC2	6 GB 8 GB (LPDDR4X)	128 GB; 256 GB (eMMC 5.1)	108 MP, f/1.8 + 2 MP, f/2.4 (macro)	13 MP, f/2.5	5030 mAh (Li-Po)	Android 14 (Xiaomi HyperOS)	Android 16 (Xiaomi HyperOS 3.1)	Black, Silver, Purple
Poco M6 Plus Redmi 13 5G	breeze	24066PC95I	June 2024	IPS LCD, 120 Hz Corning Gorilla Glass	6.79"	1080 x 2460 px (Full HD+, ~396 ppi)	Yes	Qualcomm Snapdragon 4 Gen 2 AE 2x 2.3 GHz Cortex-A78 + 6x 2 GHz Cortex-A55	Adreno 613	6 GB 8 GB (LPDDR4X)	128 GB (UFS 2.2)	108 MP, f/1.8 + 2 MP, f/2.4 (macro)	13 MP, f/2.5	5030 mAh (Li-Po)	Android 14 (Xiaomi HyperOS)	Android 16 (Xiaomi HyperOS 3.1)	Black, Silver, Purple
Poco M7 Pro 5G	beryl	2409FPCC4G	December 2024	AMOLED, 120 Hz Corning Gorilla Glass 5	6.67"	1080 x 2400 px (Full HD+, ~395 ppi)	Yes	Mediatek Dimensity 7025 2x 2.5 GHz Cortex-A78 + 6x 2 GHz Cortex-A55	IMG BXM-8-256	6 GB 8 GB (LPDDR4X)	128 GB; 256 GB (UFS 2.2)	50 MP, f/1.5 + 2 MP, f/2.4 (depth)	20 MP, f/2.2	5110 mAh (Li-Po)	Android 14 (Xiaomi HyperOS)	Android 16 (Xiaomi HyperOS 3.1)	Lavender Frost, Lunar Dust, Olive Twilight
Poco M7 5G Redmi 14C 5G	flame	MZB0KE0IN; 24108PCE2I	March 2025	IPS LCD, 120 Hz	6.88"	720 x 1640 px (HD+, ~255 ppi)	Yes	Qualcomm Snapdragon 4 Gen 2 2x 2.2 GHz Cortex-A78 + 6x 2.0 GHz Cortex-A55	Adreno 613	6 GB; 8 GB (LPDDR4X)	128 GB (UFS 2.2)	50 MP, f/1.8 + auxiliary lens	8 MP, f/2.2	5160 mAh (Li-Po)	Android 14 (Xiaomi HyperOS)	Android 16 (Xiaomi HyperOS 3.1)	Ocean Blue, Mint Green, Satin Black
Poco M8 5G Redmi Note 15 SE/Note 15 5G	kunzite(_p)	25118PC98G (Global)	January 2026	AMOLED, 120 Hz	6.77"	1080 x 2392 px (Full HD+, ~388 ppi)	Yes	Qualcomm Snapdragon 6 Gen 3 4x 2.4 GHz Cortex-A78 + 4x 1.8 GHz Cortex-A55	Adreno 710	6 GB; 8 GB (LPDDR4X)	128 GB; 256 GB 512 GB (UFS 2.2)	50 MP, f/1.8 + auxiliary lens	20 MP, f/2.2	5520 mAh (Li-Po)	Android 15 (Xiaomi HyperOS 2.2)	Android 16 (Xiaomi HyperOS 3.1)	Black, Green, Silver
Poco M8 5G Redmi Note 15 SE/Note 15 5G	kunzite(_p)	25118PC98I (India)	January 2026	AMOLED, 120 Hz	6.77"	1080 x 2392 px (Full HD+, ~388 ppi)	Yes	Qualcomm Snapdragon 6 Gen 3 4x 2.4 GHz Cortex-A78 + 4x 1.8 GHz Cortex-A55	Adreno 710	6 GB; 8 GB (LPDDR4X)	128 GB; 256 GB (UFS 2.2)	50 MP, f/1.8 + auxiliary lens	20 MP, f/2.2	5520 mAh (Li-Po)	Android 15 (Xiaomi HyperOS 2.2)	Android 16 (Xiaomi HyperOS 3.1)	Carbon Black, Glacier Blue, Frost Silver
Poco M8 Pro 5G Redmi Note 15 Pro+ (but without esim)	flourite(_p)	2510EPC8BG	January 2026	AMOLED, 120 Hz	6.83"	1280 x 2772 px (1.5K, ~447 ppi)	Yes	Qualcomm Snapdragon7s Gen 4 1x2.7 GHz Cortex-A720 + 3x2.4 GHz Cortex-A720 + 4x1.8 GHz Cortex-A520	Adreno 810	8 GB; 12 GB (LPDDR4X)	256 GB 512 GB^{(UFS 2.2)}	50 MP, f/1.6 + 8 MP, f/2.2 (ultrawide)	32 MP, f/2.2	6500 mAh (Li-Po)	Android 15 (Xiaomi HyperOS 2.2)	Android 16 (Xiaomi HyperOS 3.1)	Black, Green, Silver

=== Poco C Series ===
Model	Codename	Model number	Release date	Display type	Display size	Display resolution	5G support	SoC	GPU	RAM	Internal Storage	Camera		Battery	Operating system		Colours
Model	Codename	Model number	Release date	Display type	Display size	Display resolution	5G support	SoC	GPU	RAM	Internal Storage	Rear	Front	Battery	Initial	Latest	Colours
Poco C3	angelicain	M2006C3MII; MZB07RIIN; MZB07RJIN; MZB07QAIN; MZB07RLIN; MZB07RKIN; MZB07RHIN	October 2020	IPS LCD Panda Glass	6.43"	720 x 1600 px (HD+, ~270 ppi)	No	MediaTek Helio G35 4x 2.3 GHz Cortex-A53 + 4x 1.8 GHz Cortex-A53	PowerVR GE8320 @680 MHz	3 GB; 4 GB (LPDDR4X)	32 GB; 64 GB (eMMC 5.1)	13 MP, f/2.2 + 2 MP, f/2.4 (macro) + 2 MP, f/2.4 (depth)	5 MP, f/2.2	5000 mAh (Li-Po)	Android 10 (MIUI 12 for Poco)	Android 10 (MIUI 12 for Poco)	Arctic Blue, Lime Green, Matte Black
Poco C31 Global: Redmi 9C	angelicain	MZB0A0MIN; MZB0A0KIN; 211033MI	October 2021	IPS LCD Panda Glass	6.53"	720 x 1600 px (HD+, ~269 ppi)	No	MediaTek Helio G35 4x 2.3 GHz Cortex-A53 + 4x 1.8 GHz Cortex-A53	PowerVR GE8320 @680 MHz	3 GB; 4 GB (LPDDR4X)	32 GB; 64 GB (eMMC 5.1)	13 MP, f/2.2 + 2 MP, f/2.4 (macro) + 2 MP, f/2.4 (depth)	5 MP, f/2.2	5000 mAh (Li-Po)	Android 10 (MIUI 12 for Poco)	Android 11 (MIUI 12.5 for Poco)	Royal Blue, Shadow Gray
Poco C40	frost	220333QPG (Global); 220333QPI (India)	June 2022	IPS LCD Corning Gorilla Glass 3	6.71"	720 x 1650 px (HD+, ~269 ppi)	No	JLQ JR510 4x 2.0 GHz Cortex-A55 + 4x 1.5 GHz Cortex-A55	Mali-G57 MC1	3 GB; 4 GB (LPDDR4X)	32 GB; 64 GB (eMMC 5.1)	13 MP, f/2.2 + 2 MP, f/2.4 (depth)	5 MP, f/2.2	6000 mAh (Li-Po)	Android 11 (MIUI 13 for Poco)		Power Black, Coral Green, Poco Yellow
Poco C50 Global: Redmi A1+	snow	MZB0D3DIN	February 2023	IPS LCD	6.52"	720 x 1600 px (HD+, ~269 ppi)	No	MediaTek Helio A22 4x 2 GHz Cortex-A53	PowerVR GE8320 @650 MHz	2 GB; 3 GB (LPDDR4X)	32 GB (eMMC 5.1)	8 MP, f/2.0 + QVGA (depth)	5 MP, f/2.0	5000 mAh (Li-Po)	Android 12 (Go Edition)		Country Green, Royal Blue
Poco C55 Redmi 12C	earth	22127PC95I	March 2023	IPS LCD Corning Gorilla Glass 3	6.71"	720 x 1650 px (HD+, ~269 ppi)	No	MediaTek Helio G85 2x 2 GHz Cortex-A75 + 6x 1.8 GHz Cortex-A55	Mali-G52 MC2 @1 GHz	4 GB; 6 GB (LPDDR4X)	64 GB; 128 GB (eMMC 5.1)	50 MP, f/1.8 + QVGA (depth)	5 MP	5000 mAh (Li-Po)	Android 12 (MIUI 13 for Poco)	Android 14 (Xiaomi HyperOS)	Forest Green, Power Black, Cool Blue
Poco C51 Redmi A2+	water	23028RN4DI	April 2023	IPS LCD	6.52"	720 x 1600 px (HD+, ~269 ppi)	No	MediaTek Helio G36 4x 2.2 GHz Cortex-A53 + 4x 1.7 GHz Cortex-A53	PowerVR GE8320 @680 MHz	4 GB (LPDDR4X)	64 GB (eMMC 5.1)	8 MP, f/2.0 + QVGA (depth)	5 MP, f/2.0	5000 mAh (Li-Po)	Android 13 (Go Edition)		Country Green, Royal Blue
Poco C65 Redmi 13C	gale	2310FPCA4I	November 2023	IPS LCD, 90 Hz Corning Gorilla Glass	6.74"	720 x 1600 px (HD+, ~260 ppi)	No	MediaTek Helio G85 2x 2 GHz Cortex-A75 + 6x 1.8 GHz Cortex-A55	Mali-G52 MC2 @1 GHz	6 GB 8 GB (LPDDR4X)	128 GB; 256 GB (eMMC 5.1)	50 MP, f/1.8 + 2 MP, f/2.4 (macro) + QVGA (depth)	8 MP, f/2.0	5000 mAh (Li-Po)	Android 13 (MIUI 14 for Poco)	Android 15 (Xiaomi HyperOS 2)	Matte Black, Pastel Blue
Poco C65 Redmi 13C	gust	2310FPCA4G	November 2023	IPS LCD, 90 Hz Corning Gorilla Glass	6.74"	720 x 1600 px (HD+, ~260 ppi)	No	MediaTek Helio G85 2x 2 GHz Cortex-A75 + 6x 1.8 GHz Cortex-A55	Mali-G52 MC2 @1 GHz	6 GB 8 GB (LPDDR4X)	128 GB; 256 GB (eMMC 5.1)	50 MP, f/1.8 + 2 MP, f/2.4 (macro) + QVGA (depth)	8 MP, f/2.0	5000 mAh (Li-Po)	Android 13 (MIUI 14 for Poco)	Android 15 (Xiaomi HyperOS 2)	Black, Blue, Purple
Poco C61 Redmi A3	klein	2312BPC51H	March 2024	IPS LCD, 90 Hz Corning Gorilla Glass 3	6.71"	720 x 1650 px (HD+, ~269 ppi)	No	MediaTek Helio G36 4x 2.2 GHz Cortex-A53 + 4x 1.7 GHz Cortex-A53	PowerVR GE8320 @680 MHz	4 GB 6 GB (LPDDR4X)	64 GB; 128 GB (eMMC 5.1)	8 MP, f/2.0 + QVGA (depth)	5 MP, f/2.0	5000 mAh (Li-Po)	Android 14	Android 15	Ethereal Blue, Diamond Dust Black, Mystical Green
Poco C75 Redmi 14C	lake	2410FPCC5G	October 2024	IPS LCD, 120 Hz	6.88"	720 x 1640 px (HD+, ~260 ppi)	No	MediaTek Helio G81 Ultra 2x 2 GHz Cortex-A75 + 6x 1.8 GHz Cortex-A55	Mali-G52 MC2	6 GB 8 GB (LPDDR4X)	128 GB; 256 GB (eMMC 5.1)	50 MP, f/1.8 + QVGA (depth)	13 MP, f/2.0	5160 mAh (Li-Po)	Android 14 (Xiaomi HyperOS)	Android 16 (Xiaomi HyperOS 3.1)	Black, Green, Gold
Poco C75 5G Redmi A4 5G	warm	24116PCC1I	December 2024	IPS LCD, 120 Hz	6.88"	720 x 1640 px (HD+, ~260 ppi)	Yes	Qualcomm Snapdragon 4s Gen 2 2x 2.0 GHz Cortex-A78 + 6x 1.8 GHz Cortex-A55	Adreno 611	4 GB (LPDDR4X)	64 GB (UFS 2.2)	50 MP, f/1.8 + QVGA (depth)	5 MP, f/2.2	5160 mAh (Li-Po)	Android 14 (Xiaomi HyperOS)	Android 16 (Xiaomi HyperOS 3.1)	Aqua Bliss, Enchanted Green, Silver Stardust
Poco C71^{Redmi A5}	serenity	25028PC03G (Global) 25028PC03I (India)	April 2025	IPS LCD, 120 Hz	6.88"	720 x 1640 px (HD+, ~260 ppi)	No	Unisoc T7250 2x 1.8 GHz Cortex-A75 + 6x 1.6 GHz Cortex-A55	Mali-G57 MP1	4 GB 6 GB (LPDDR4X)	64GB 128GB^{(eMMC 5.1)}	32MP, f/1.8 + Auxiliary lens	8MP, f/2.0	5200 mAh	Android 15 (Go Edition)		Power Black, Cool Blue, Desert Gold
Poco C85 Redmi 15C	dew	25078PC3EG (Global) 25078PC3EE (Europe)	September 2025	IPS LCD, 120 Hz	6.9"	720 x 1600 px (HD+, ~254 ppi)	No	MediaTek Helio G81 Ultra 2x 2 GHz Cortex-A75 + 6x 1.8 GHz Cortex-A55	Mali-G52 MC2	6 GB 8 GB (LPDDR4X)	128 GB; 256 GB (eMMC 5.1)	50 MP, f/1.8 + Auxiliary lens	8MP, f/2.0	6000 mAh	Android 15 (Xiaomi HyperOS2.2)	Android 16 (Xiaomi HyperOS 3.1)	Black, Purple, Green
Poco C85 5G Redmi 15C 5G	tornado	2508CPC2BI	December 2025	IPS LCD, 120 Hz	6.9"	720 x 1600 px (HD+, ~254 ppi)	Yes	Mediatek Dimensity 6100+ 2x 2.2 GHz Cortex-A76 + 6x 2 GHz Cortex-A55	Mali-G57 MC2 @962 MHz	4 GB 6 GB 8 GB (LPDDR4X)	128 GB; 256 GB (UFS 2.2)	50 MP, f/1.8 + Auxiliary lens	8MP, f/2.0	6000 mAh	Android 15 (Xiaomi HyperOS2.2)	Android 16 (Xiaomi HyperOS 3.1)	Power Black, Mystic Purple, Spring Green
Poco C85x Redmi 15A / A7 Pro 5G	somalia	26020PC1AI	March 2026	IPS LCD, 120 Hz	6.9"	720 x 1600 px (HD+, ~254 ppi)	Yes	Unisoc T8300 2x 2.2 GHz Cortex-A78 + 6x 2.0 GHz Cortex-A55	Mali-G57 MC2	4 GB (LPDDR4X)	64 GB 128 GB^{(eMMC 5.1)}	32MP, f/1.8 + Auxiliary lens	8MP, f/2.0	6300 mAh	Android 16 (Xiaomi HyperOS 3)	Android 16 (Xiaomi HyperOS 3.1)	Elite Black, Emerald Green, Sunset Gold
Poco C81x Redmi A7	serenity	26020PCB4I	April 2026	IPS LCD, 120 Hz	6.88"	720 x 1600 px (HD+, ~260 ppi)	No	Unisoc T7250 2x 1.8 GHz Cortex-A75 + 6x 1.6 GHz Cortex-A55	Mali-G57 MP1	3 GB (LPDDR4X)	64 GB^{(eMMC 5.1)}	13MP, f/2.2	8MP, f/2.0	6300 mAh	Android 15 (Go Edition)		Crystal Black, Ice Blue
Poco C81 Redmi A7 Pro Global: Poco C81 Pro	arctic	25128PC17I	April 2026	IPS LCD, 120 Hz	6.9"	720 x 1600 px (HD+, ~254 ppi)	No	Unisoc T7250 2x 1.8 GHz Cortex-A75 + 6x 1.6 GHz Cortex-A55	Mali-G57 MP1	4 GB (LPDDR4X)	64 GB^{(UFS 2.2)}	13MP, f/2.2 + Auxiliary lens	8MP, f/2.0	6000 mAh	Android 16 (Xiaomi HyperOS 3)	Android 16 (Xiaomi HyperOS 3.1)	Elite Black, Sky Blue, Sunset Gold
Poco C81 Pro Redmi A7 Pro India: Poco C81	arctic	25128PC17G (Global) 25128PC17Y (NFC) Латинська Америка: 25128PC17L	April 2026	IPS LCD, 120 Hz	6.9"	720 x 1600 px (HD+, ~254 ppi)	No	Unisoc T7250 2x 1.8 GHz Cortex-A75 + 6x 1.6 GHz Cortex-A55	Mali-G57 MP1	4 GB (LPDDR4X)	64 GB 128 GB 256 GB^{(UFS 2.2)}	13MP, f/2.2 + Auxiliary lens	8MP, f/2.0	5200 mAh	Android 16 (Xiaomi HyperOS 3)	Android 16 (Xiaomi HyperOS 3.1)	Black, Green, Gold
Poco C95 Pro Redmi 17	leedsa	2606FPC72L (Latin America) 2606FPC72Y (Global)	September 2026	IPS LCD, 120 Hz	6.9"	720 x 1600 px (HD+, ~254 ppi)	No	MediaTek Helio G91 Ultra 2x 2 GHz Cortex-A75 + 6x 1.8 GHz Cortex-A55	Mali-G52 MC2	6 GB 8 GB (LPDDR4X)	128 GB; 256 GB (eMMC 5.1)	50 MP, f/1.8 + Auxiliary lens	8MP, f/2.1	7500 mAh	Android 16 (Xiaomi HyperOS 3.1)	Android 16 (Xiaomi HyperOS 3.1)	Black, Blue, Green

== Smartwatch ==
Model	Release date	Display type	Display size	Display resolution	Sensors	GPS	Ingress Protection rating	Battery	Colours
Poco Watch China: Redmi Watch 2	April 2022	AMOLED	1.6"	360 x 320 (~301 ppi density)	Accelerometer; Heart rate Compass; SpO2; Gyroscope	GLONASS Galileo; BDS	IP67	225 mAh	Black, Blue, Ivory

== Software update policy ==
The Android and MIUI/Xiaomi HyperOS update support may vary depending on the series model.

Series	Models	Android	MIUI/Xiaomi HyperOS	Security updates
F	F4	+2 major versions	+2 major versions	+3 years
F	F1	+2 major versions	+3 major versions	+2 years
F	F3 GT, F4 GT, F5 series	+2 major versions	+3 major versions	+3 years
F	F2 Pro, F3	+2 major versions	+4 major versions	+3 years
F	F6 series	+3 major versions	+4 major versions	+4 years
F	F7 series, F8 series, F9 series	+4 major versions	+5 major versions	+6 years
X	X2, X3 Pro	+1 major version	+2 major versions	+2 years
X	X3 GT, X4 Pro 5G	+2 major versions	+2 major versions	+3 years
X	X3	+2 major versions	+3 major versions	+2 years
X	X3 NFC, X4 GT, X5 series, X6 Neo	+2 major versions	+3 major versions	+3 years
X	X6	+3 major versions	+3 major versions	+4 years
X	X6 Pro	+3 major versions	+4 major versions	+4 years
X	X7 series, X8 series	+4 major versions	+4 or 5 major versions	+6 years
M	M5s	+1 major version	+1 major version	+2 years
M	M2 Reloaded	+2 major versions	+2 major versions	+1 year
M	M4 series, M5	+2 major versions	+2 major versions	+3 years
M	M2	+2 major versions	+3 major versions	+2 years
M	M3 series	+2 major versions	+3 major versions	+3 years
M	M6 series, M7 series	+2 major versions	+2 major versions	+4 years
M	M2 Pro	+2 major versions	+4 major versions	+3 years
M	M8 series	+4 major versions	+4 or 5 major versions	+6 years
C	C50, C51	0 major versions	-	+2 years
C	C61, C71	+1 major version	-	+2 years
C	C3, C40	0 major versions	0 major versions	+2 years
C	C31	+1 major version	+1 major version	+1 year
C	C55, C65, C75, C75 5G	+2 major version	+2 major version	+4 years
C	C81/C81 Pro, C85, C85 5G, C95 Pro	+4 major versions	+4 major versions	+6 years
