= Poco X3 =

Android-based midrange smartphones by Xiaomi

Poco X3/X3 NFC/X3 Pro
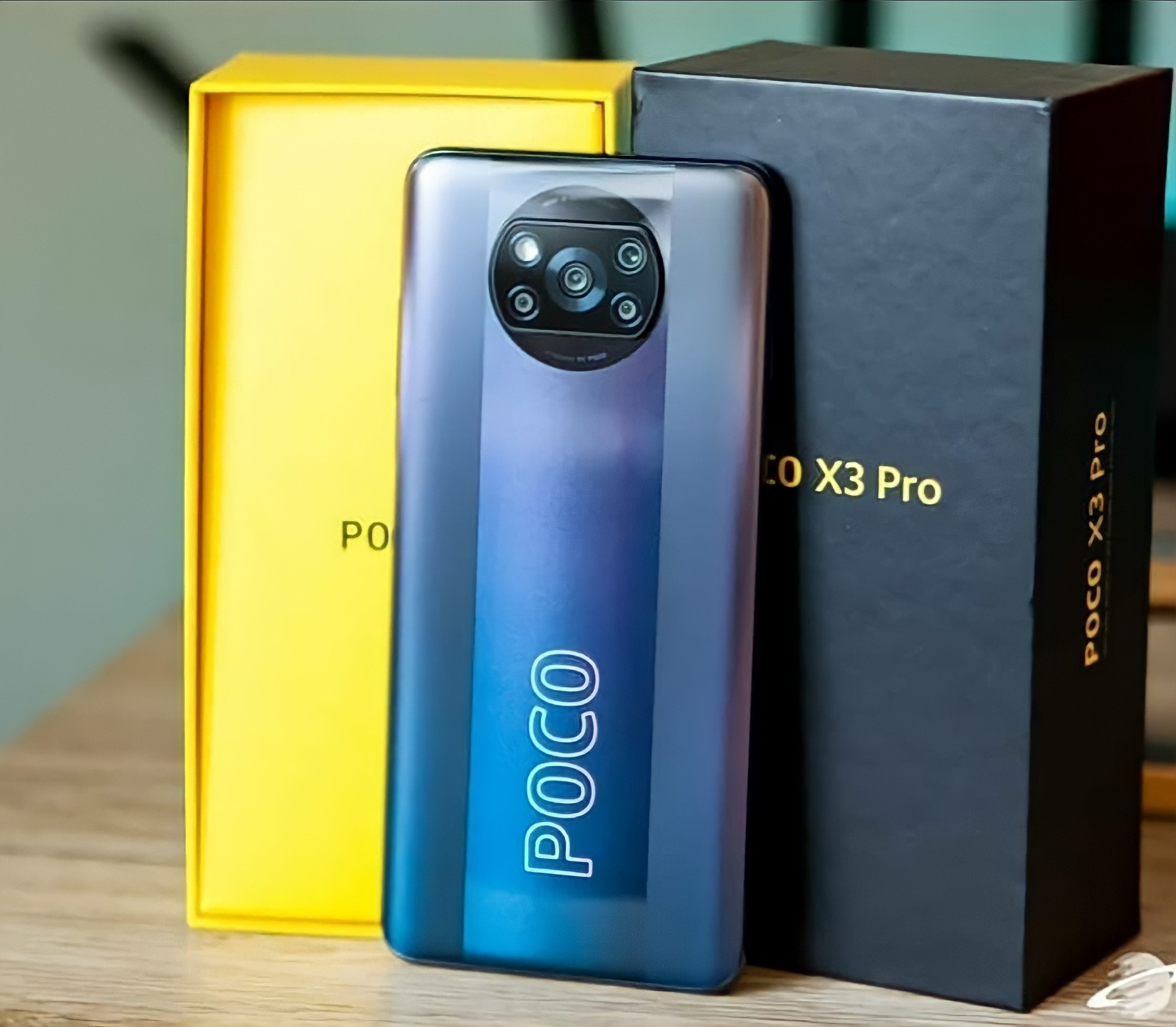
- A Phantom Black Poco X3 Pro
- Brand: Poco
- Manufacturer: Xiaomi
- Type: Phablet
- Series: Poco X
- First released: Poco X3: 29 September 2020; 5 years ago; Poco X3 NFC: 15 October 2020; 5 years ago; Poco X3 Pro: 24 March 2021; 5 years ago
- Predecessor: Poco X2
- Successor: Poco X5 5G; Poco X4 Pro 5G
- Related: Poco X3 GT
- Compatible networks: List: Technology: GSM / HSPA / LTE; 2G bands: GSM 850 / 900 / 1800 / 1900; 3G bands: Poco X3: HSDPA 850 / 900 / 1900 / 2100; Poco X3 NFC/Poco X3 Pro: HSDPA 850 / 900 / 1700(AWS) / 1900 / 2100; 4G bands (LTE): Poco X3: 1, 3, 5, 8, 40, 41; Poco X3 NFC: 1, 2, 3, 4, 5, 7, 8, 20, 28, 38, 40, 41; Poco X3 Pro: 1, 2, 3, 4, 5, 7, 8, 20, 28, 38, 40, 41 - International; 1, 2, 3, 5, 8, 38, 40, 41 - India; Speed: HSPA, LTE
- Form factor: Slate
- Dimensions: H: 165.3 mm (6.51 in); W: 76.8 mm (3.02 in); D: 9.4–10.1 mm (0.37–0.40 in)
- Weight: Poco X3 NFC & Poco X3 Pro: 215 g (7.6 oz); Poco X3: 225 g (7.9 oz)
- Operating system: Original: Poco X3/NFC: MIUI 12 for Poco based on Android 10; Poco X3 Pro: MIUI 12 for Poco based on Android 11; Current: Poco X3/Pro: MIUI 13 for Poco based on Android 12; Poco X3 NFC: MIUI 14 for Poco based on Android 12; Poco X3 Pro: MIUI 14 for Poco based on Android 13
- System-on-chip: Poco X3 and Poco X3 NFC: Qualcomm Snapdragon 732G; Poco X3 Pro: Qualcomm Snapdragon 860
- CPU: 2×2.3 GHz Kryo 470 Gold + 6×1.8 GHz Kryo 470 Silver
- GPU: Poco X3 and Poco X3 NFC: Adreno 618 Poco X3 Pro: Adreno 640
- Memory: 6 GB RAM LPDDR4X; 8 GB LPDDR4X
- Storage: Poco X3 and Poco X3 NFC: 64 or 128 GB UFS 2.1; Poco X3 Pro: 128 or 256 GB UFS 3.1
- Removable storage: microSDXC, shared SIM slot
- Battery: Non-removable Li-ion battery (33-watt fast-charging, USB Type-C): Poco X3 NFC and Poco X3 Pro: 5160 mAh; Poco X3: 6000 mAh
- Rear camera: 64 MP main camera, 1.6 μm 4-in-1 super pixel, 1/1.73" sensor size, PDAF, f/1.89, dual-LED flash 13 MP ultrawide, 119° angle of view, f/2.2 2 MP macro, f/2.4 2 MP depth, f/2.4 LED flash, panorama, HDR 4K@30fps 1080p@30/120fps 720p@960fps gyro-EIS
- Front camera: 20 MP, 1.6 μm 4-in-1 super pixel, f/2.2, HDR, panorama, 1080p@30fps
- Display: 6.67" 1080 × 2400 pixels IPS LCD; 395 pixels per inch; 120 Hz refresh rate; 240 Hz touch sampling rate; HDR10
- Sound: Dual stereo speaker; 4cc-equivalent 1012 upper speaker, open cavity; 1cc-equivalent 1216 lower speaker; Maximum speaker vibration amplitude: 0.5 mm; Hi-Res audio certification; 3.5mm audio jack
- Connectivity: Wi-Fi 802.11 a/b/g/n/ac, dual-band, Wi-Fi Direct, hotspot; Bluetooth v5.1, A2DP, LE; FM radio
- Data inputs: Capacitive touchscreen; Fingerprint sensor (side-mounted); Accelerometer; Gyroscope; Proximity sensor; Magnetometer
- Model: Global/NFC version: M2007J20CG, India version: M2007J20CI
- Codename: xiaomi‑surya NFC version: surya
- Other: A-GPS, BDS, GLONASS, NFC (not available on Indian variant), fingerprint (side-mounted), accelerometer, gyroscope, proximity sensor, compass, 3.5mm headphone jack, IR blaster

The Poco X3, Poco X3 NFC and Poco X3 Pro are Android-based smartphones developed, designed, and marketed by Xiaomi under Poco subbrand, announced on 7 and 22 September 2020 (X3/NFC on 7–22 September, and X3 Pro in March 2021). All three feature a 6.67 in (169 mm) FHD+ IPS LCD with 120 Hz refresh rate, a side-mounted fingerprint sensor, and quad‑camera setups: the original X3 includes a 64 MP main and 13 MP ultra‑wide, whereas the X3 NFC and X3 Pro use a 48 MP main and 8 MP ultra‑wide sensor, alongside 2 MP macro and depth sensors. They all house a 5160 mAh battery (the X3 non‑NFC variant had 6000 mAh), up to 8 GB RAM, and run on Snapdragon 732 G (X3 and X3 NFC) or 860 (X3 Pro) chipsets.

At launch, the X3/X3 NFC ran MIUI 12 based on Android 10, and the X3 Pro shipped with MIUI 12 on Android 11. Over time, updates brought them to MIUI 13 on Android 12 for X3/X3 Pro, and MIUI 14 on Android 12 for X3 NFC; the X3 Pro has since received MIUI 14 on Android 13.

These devices received criticism over PMIC (power management IC) reliability issues—faulty PMICs could lead to bricking due to charging failure or memory corruption, and Xiaomi acknowledged the issue, offering extended warranty support in some regions. Many users resolved it by rebooting into fastboot to recalibrate the PMIC

== Specifications ==
=== Design & display ===
The phone measures at 165.3 mm of width, 76.8 mm of height, and 9.4 mm of thickness; and weights around 215 g for NFC version (225 g for non‑NFC India model). The frame and back were made of plastic with Corning Gorilla Glass 5 front and in IP53 splash‑proof rating.

Both models utilize a 6.67 in (169 mm) IPS LCD FHD+ (2400 × 1080 px, ~395 ppi) with a refresh rate of 120 Hz, 240 Hz touch sampling rate, HDR10, TÜV Rheinland Low Blue Light certified, and ~1500 : 1 contrast ratio.

=== Hardware ===
- Processor: Qualcomm Snapdragon 732G (SM7150‑AC), octa‑core (2× Kryo 470 Gold @2.3 GHz + 6× Kryo 470 Silver @1.8 GHz), 8‑nm process; GPU: Adreno 618 up to ~800 MHz.
- Memory & Storage: 6 GB LPDDR4X; 64 GB or 128 GB UFS 2.1; microSDXC slot (hybrid SIM slot) supporting up to 512 GB (up to 1 TB in some regions).
- Battery & Charging:
  - NFC version: 5160 mAh (typical)
  - Non‑NFC India version: 6000 mAh
  - Supports 33 W fast charging via USB‑C; full charge in ~66 minutes in lab conditions.
- Rear Camera: Quad setup —
  - 64 MP main (Sony IMX682, 1/1.73″, f/1.89, 1.6 μm 4‑in‑1 super pixels, PDAF)
  - 13 MP ultrawide (119 °FOV, f/2.2, ~1.0 μm)
  - 2 MP macro (FF, ~1.75 μm, f/2.4)
  - 2 MP depth sensor (~1.75 μm, f/2.4); dual‑LED flash; shooting modes include panorama, HDR, video modes up to 4K@30fps, 720p@960fps slow motion, gyro‑EIS stabilization.
- Front Camera: 20 MP Samsung Isocell S5K3T2 (HDR, panorama, ~1.6 μm super pixels, f/2.2; up to 1080p@30fps video).
- Connectivity:
  - Wi‑Fi 802.11 a/b/g/n/ac (dual‑band, Wi‑Fi Direct, hotspot)
  - Bluetooth 5.1
  - NFC (depending on market/variant)
  - USB 2.0 Type‑C
  - IR blaster, FM radio
- Sensors: Side‑mounted fingerprint, accelerometer, gyroscope, ambient light, proximity sensor, compass (magnetometer).
- Sound & Haptics: Dual stereo speakers (upper ~1 cc cavity + lower ~4 cc), Hi‑Res Audio certified, 3.5 mm headphone jack, precision Z‑axis linear motor ("4D" vibration feedback)

=== Software ===
==== Poco X3 ====
The device runs on Xiaomi's MIUI 12 user interface based on Android 10 with Poco Launcher 2.0 at launch in 2020. It was updated MIUI 13 based on Android 12 (current global stable).

- Custom ROM support:
  - LineageOS: Official support up to LineageOS 22.2 based on Android 15 (current official build).

==== Poco X3 NFC ====
The device runs on Xiaomi's MIUI 12 user interface based on Android 10 with Poco Launcher 2.0. It was updated to MIUI 14 for Poco based on Android 12 (current global stable builds include V14.0.2.0.SJGMIXM for Global and V14.0.5.0.SJGEUXM for EEA regions).

==== Software update history ====
In August 2022, the Poco X3 NFC received official Android 12 update and "unofficial" Android 13 updates.

In March 2022, the X3 Pro was updated to MIUI 13 along with the Mi 11 Ultra. It was update to MIUI in the second quarter in 2023.

- Security updates: Community reports suggest that official Android or security support has largely ended by early 2025 for these devices

=== Price ===
In the European market, Poco X3 Pro was launched at €249 for 6 GB RAM/128 GB storage variant and €299 for 8 GB RAM/256 GB storage variant

== Criticism ==
The Poco X3 Pro and maybe the Poco X3 NFC had a faulty PMIC, which eventually caused the phone to not charge and the memory chip to corrupt, rendering the phone bricked, as you need an authorized Mi account to flash using EDL. Contrary to popular belief it affected both the Indian and the EEA variants. A temporary fix was rebooting the phone into fastboot, which caused a "recalibration" of the PMIC. Xiaomi confirmed the issue and gave another 6 months of warranty to the Indian version.

Lot of screens were defect, which caused ghost touch issues and random wake-ups. Sometimes it corresponded with a PMIC failure which caused some to believe that the PMIC caused these issues, although Xiaomi has not acknowledged it.

The phone case ended up damaging from blasting, 5 minutes after unpluging the charger. The user was from Aman Bhardwaj, a Twitter user who posted images to Twitter. The LCM itself is crushed and the case was bent, stating from spokesperson from POCO India "the device (POCO X3 Pro) appeared bent and the LCM (liquid crystal module) was in a crushed condition which indicates the application of external force. This is thus classified under 'customer induced damage" and was a case of "customer induced damage".

== See also ==
- Redmi Note 10 Pro 5G — marketed as the Poco X3 GT on global market.
