= Redmi 13C =

Android budget smartphones manufactured by Redmi

Redmi 13C Redmi 13C 5G
- Brand: Redmi
- Manufacturer: Xiaomi
- Type: Phablet
- Series: Redmi
- First released: 13C: November 9, 2023; 3 years ago 13C 5G: December 6, 2023; 2 years ago
- Predecessor: Redmi 12C
- Successor: Redmi 14C
- Related: Redmi 13; Redmi Note 13; Redmi 12; Redmi A3
- Compatible networks: 13C: GSM, 3G, 4G (LTE); 13C 5G: GSM, 3G, 4G (LTE), 5G
- Form factor: Slate
- Colors: 13C: Midnight/Stardust Black; Navy Blue; Glacier White; Clover/Stardust Green; 13C 5G: Starry/Starlight Black; Twilight Blue; Glacier White; Startrail Green
- Dimensions: H: 168 mm W: 78 mm D: 8.09 mm
- Weight: 6.77 oz (192 g)
- Operating system: Initial: Android 13 with MIUI 14; Current: Android 15 with Xiaomi HyperOS 3
- System-on-chip: 13C: MediaTek Helio G85 (12 nm); 13C 5G: MediaTek Dimensity 6100+ (6 nm)
- CPU: 13C: Octa-core (2×2 GHz Cortex-A75 & 6×1.8 GHz Cortex-A55); 13C 5G: Octa-core (2×2.2 GHz Cortex-A76 & 6×2 GHz Cortex-A55)
- GPU: 13C: Mali-G52 MC2; 13C 5G: Mali-G57 MC2
- Memory: 4/6/8 GB LPDDR4X
- Storage: 13C: 128/256 GB eMMC 5.1; 13C 5G: 128/256 GB UFS 2.2
- Removable storage: microSDXC up to 1 TB
- SIM: Dual SIM (Nano-SIM)
- Battery: Non-removable, Li-Po 5000 mAh
- Charging: 18W, Power Delivery
- Rear camera: 13C: 50 MP, f/1.8, 28mm (wide), PDAF + 2 MP, f/2.4 (macro) + VGA (auxiliary lens); 13C 5G: 50 MP, f/1.8, 28mm (wide), PDAF + VGA (auxiliary lens); LED flash, HDR; Video: 1080p@30fps
- Front camera: 13C: 8 MP, f/2.0 13C 5G: 5 MP; HDR; Video: 1080p@30fps
- Display: IPS LCD, 90Hz, 6.74", 1600 × 720 (HD+), 20:9, 260 ppi
- Sound: Mono speaker, 3.5 mm jack
- Connectivity: USB-C 2.0, Bluetooth 5.3 (A2DP, LE), FM radio, Wi-Fi 802.11 a/b/g/n/ac (dual-band), GPS, GLONASS, Galileo, BeiDou
- Data inputs: Fingerprint scanner (side-mounted); Accelerometer; Virtual proximity sensor; Compass
- Model: 13C: 23100RN82L, 23108RN04Y; 13C 5G: 23124RN87C, 23124RN87G, 23124RN87I
- Codename: 13C: gale 13C (NFC): gust 13C 5G: air 13C 5G (NFC): atmos
- Made in: China, India
- Website: Redmi 13C Official Website; Redmi 13C 5G Official Website

The Redmi 13C and Redmi 13C 5G are entry-level Android-based budget smartphones developed and manufactured by Redmi as part of the "Redmi" series. They were unveiled on November 9, 2023 for the 13C and on December 6, 2023, for the 5G, respectively, and it also serves as a successor of the Redmi 12C and a predecessor of the Redmi 14C.

The availability of the Redmi 13C was initially launched on November 10, 2023. Philippine markets will be available on December 1 along with Pakistan. The 5G model was released in India on December 6, 2023, along with the 4G LTE version of the 13C.

== Design & build ==
Besides other certain Redmi phones, the front is made of Corning Gorilla Glass and the back panel and frame are made of plastic with a polycarbonate texture. The bottom features a USB-C port, a speaker, and a microphone. The top houses a 3.5 mm audio jack. On the left side, there is a tray with slots for 2 SIM cards and a microSD memory card up to 1 TB. On the right side, there is the volume rocker and the power button, which includes a built-in fingerprint scanner.

The smartphones were available in the following colors:

| Redmi 13C | | Redmi 13C 5G | |
| Color | Name | Color | Name |
|---|---|---|---|
| | Midnight/Stardust Black | | Starry/Starlight Black |
| | Navy Blue | | Twilight Blue |
| | Glacier White | | Starry/Startrail Silver |
| | Clover/Starshine Green | | Startrail Green |

== Specifications ==
=== Hardware ===
The Redmi 13C, like its predecessor, the Redmi 12C, is powered by the MediaTek Helio G85 system-on-a-chip processor with a Mali-G52 MC2 GPU. On the other hand, the Redmi 13C 5G features the MediaTek Dimensity 6100+ with 5G support and a Mali-G57 MC2 GPU. Both models share the octa-core with different chip setup. The 13C consists of 2× Cortex-A75 clocking at 2.0 GHz & 6× Cortex-A55 clocking at 1.8 GHz, while the 5G model has a slightly higher performance, which consists of 2× Cortex-A76 clocking at 2.2 GHz & 6× Cortex-A55 clocking at 2.0 GHz.

=== Battery ===
The models are equipped with a non-removable 5000 mAh lithium-polymer battery with 57 hours of battery life per charge. They also support 18W fast charging.

=== Cameras ===
The Redmi 13C features a triple AI main camera setup consisting of a 50 MP wide-angle lens with an f/1.8 aperture and PDAF, a 2 MP macro lens with an f/2.4 aperture, and a VGA auxiliary lens. It also has an 8 MP front camera with an f/2.0 aperture. On the other hand, the Redmi 13C 5G features a dual main camera setup consisting of a 50 MP wide-angle lens with an f/1.8 aperture and PDAF, and a VGA auxiliary lens. This model has a 5 MP front camera. The main and front cameras of both models can record video at 1080p@30fps.

=== Display ===
With dimensions at 168 × 78 × 8.09 mm, the 13C and 13C 5G models feature a 6.74" IPS LCD, with HD+ resolution (1600 × 720), a 20:9 aspect ratio, a 260 ppi pixel density, a 90 Hz refresh rate, and a waterdrop notch for the front camera.

=== Memory configurations ===
The models were sold in 4/128, 6/128, and 8/256 GB configurations. The Redmi 13C uses eMMC 5.1 internal storage, while the 5G model uses UFS 2.2.

=== Software ===
Redmi 13C and Redmi 13C 5G were released with the pre-installed MIUI 14 UI with Android 13 mobile operating system. Later, both models were updated to Xiaomi HyperOS 3 with Android 15.

== Reception ==
In terms of photography, the smartphone's rear camera takes sufficient with lightning, but it struggles in low-light conditions with high contrasts due to overexposed light areas and darkness in darker areas.

In terms of battery life, Tech Advisor reviewer Mattias Inghe notices that the Redmi 13C and its previous Redmi budget phones is normal, stating "Battery life is acceptable, but not as good as most of the best budget phones." With low resolution and brightness, it should by able to save battery life, while moderate performance should consume more. The battery life is approximately 8 to 13 hours depending on the energy consumption.

| Preceded by Redmi 12C | Redmi 13C/13C 5G; 2023 | Succeeded by Redmi 14C/14C 5G |
| Preceded by Redmi 12R | Redmi 13R; 2023 | Succeeded by Redmi 14R |
| Preceded by POCO C55 | POCO C65; 2023 | Succeeded by POCO C75/C75 5G |
| Preceded by POCO M5 | POCO M6 5G; 2023 | Succeeded by POCO M7 5G |
