= Poco M5 =

2022 Android smartphone made by Xiaomi

Poco M5 Redmi 11 Prime
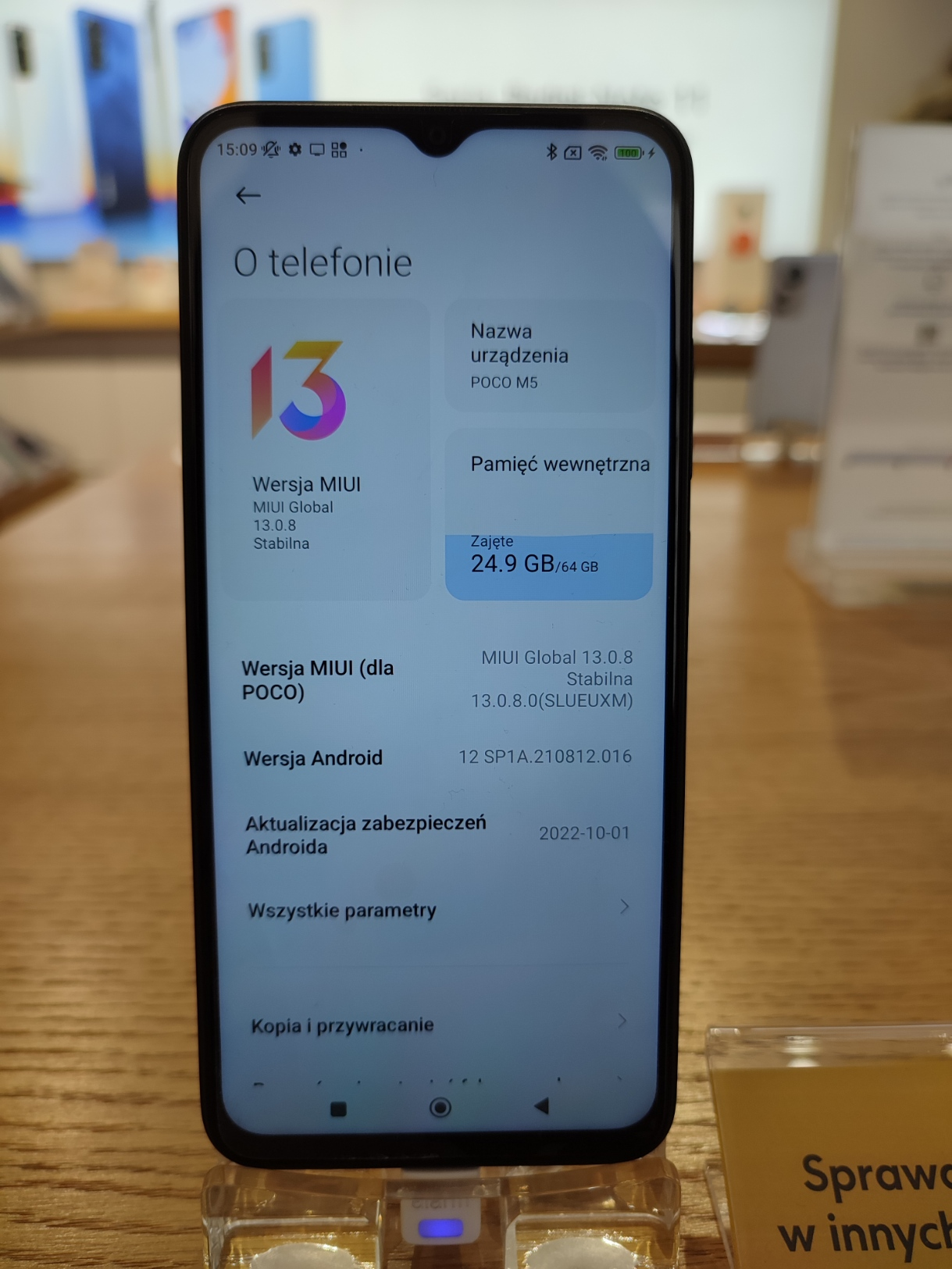
- The front of the Poco M5
- Brand: Poco/Redmi
- Manufacturer: Xiaomi
- Type: Phablet
- Series: Poco M/Redmi
- First released: M5: September 5, 2022; 3 years ago Redmi 11 Prime: September 6, 2022; 3 years ago
- Availability by region: M5: September 13, 2022; 11 Prime: India September 23, 2022
- Predecessor: Poco M4 5G; Redmi 10 Prime
- Successor: Poco M6; Poco M6 5G; Redmi 12
- Related: Poco M5s; Redmi 11 Prime 5G
- Compatible networks: GSM / HSPA / LTE
- Form factor: Slate
- Colors: M5: Power Black (Black), Icy Blue (Green), Poco Yellow (Yellow); Redmi 11 Prime: Flashy Black, Playful Green, Peppy Purple
- Dimensions: 164 mm (6.5 in) H 76.1 mm (3.00 in) W 8.9 mm (0.35 in) D
- Weight: 201 g (7.1 oz)
- Operating system: Original: M5: Android 12, MIUI 13 for Poco; Redmi 11 Prime: Android 12, MIUI 13; Current: Android 14, Xiaomi HyperOS
- System-on-chip: MediaTek MT8781 Helio G99 (7 nm)
- CPU: Octa-core (2x2.2 GHz Cortex-A76 & 6x2 GHz Cortex-A55)
- GPU: Mali-G57 MC2
- Memory: 4 GB, 6 GB LPDDR4X RAM
- Storage: 64 GB, 128 GB UFS 2.2
- Removable storage: microSDXC expandable up to 1 TB
- SIM: Dual nano-SIM
- Battery: Li-Po 5000 mAh
- Charging: Fast charging 18 W
- Rear camera: 50 MP, f/1.8, 26mm (wide), PDAF; 2 MP, f/2.4 (macro); 2 MP, f/2.4 (depth); Video: 1080p@30fps
- Front camera: M5: 5 MP, f/2.2 (wide), 1/5.0", 1.12 μm M5 (India): 8 MP, f/2.0 (wide), 1/4.0", 1.12 μm Redmi 11 Prime: 8 MP, f/2.2 (wide); Video: 1080p@30fps
- Display: IPS LCD, 6.58 in (167 mm), 104.3 cm2 (~83.6% screen-to-body ratio), 1080 x 2408 pixels, 20:9 ratio (~401 ppi density)
- Sound: Loudspeaker, 3.5mm jack
- Connectivity: USB Type-C 2.0; Wi-Fi 802.11 a/b/g/n/ac, dual-band, Wi-Fi Direct; Bluetooth 5.3 (M5)/5.1 (Redmi 11 Prime), A2DP, LE; A-GPS, GLONASS, BDS, GALILEO
- Data inputs: Sensors: Fingerprint scanner (side-mounted); Accelerometer; Gyroscope; Proximity sensor; Compass
- Model: M5: 22071219CG, 22071219CI; Redmi 11 Prime: 22071219AI
- Codename: rock
- Website: www.po.co/global/product/poco-m5; www.poco.in/m5; www.mi.com/in/product/redmi-11-prime-4g/

The Poco M5 is a mid-budget Android-based smartphone developed by Poco as a part of the M series, and was introduced on September 5, 2022, alongside the Poco M5s.

Also, a day later in India Xiaomi launched a similar model under Redmi brand called Redmi 11 Prime with main difference in design.

== Design ==
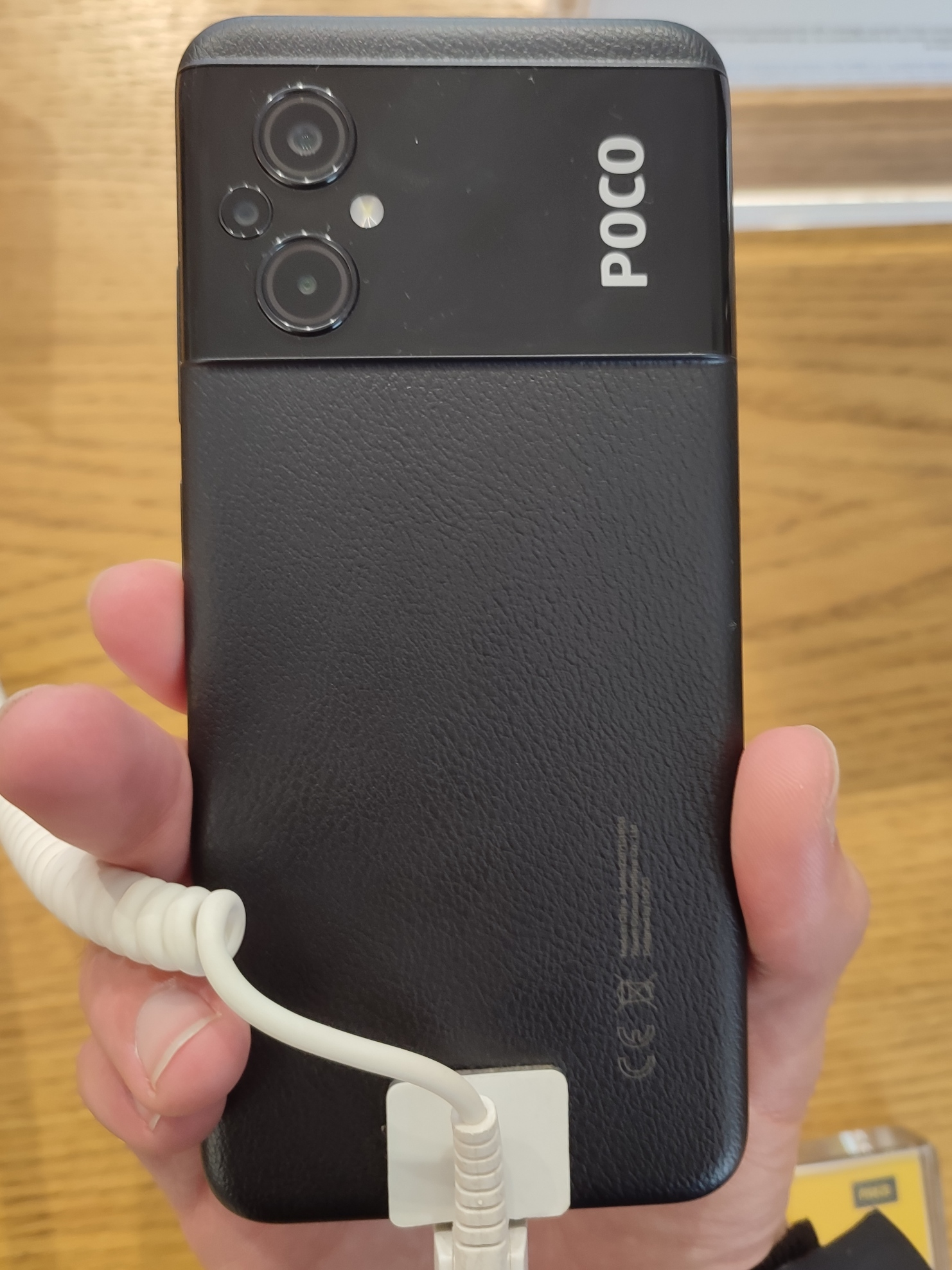
The back of Poco M5 in Black

The front is made of Gorilla Glass 3, while the back is made of plastic with a leather-like texture on the Poco M5, and a triangular texture on the Redmi 11 Prime.

The design of the Poco M5, like the design of the Poco M4 5G, is similar to that of the Pixel 6, with a slightly curved on the sides camera island, expanded across the entire back width. On the other hand, the Redmi 11 Prime has a rectangular vertical camera island.

On the bottom of smartphones, the user can find a USB-C port, a speaker, and a microphone. On the top side, there are an infrared blaster and a 3,5mm audio jack. On the left side, there is dual SIM tray with a microSD card slot. On the right side, there are the volume rocker and the power button with an integrated fingerprint scanner.

The Poco M5 and Redmi 11 Prime were sold in the following color options:

Poco M5		Redmi 11 Prime	
Color	Name	Color	Name
	Power Black (Black)		Flashy Black
	Icy Blue (Green)		Playful Green
	Poco Yellow (Yellow)		Peppy Purple

== Specifications ==
=== Hardware ===
The smartphones feature the MediaTek Helio G99 SoC, that is more productive in CPU performance and slightly less productive in GPU performance compared to the Helio G95, which is used in the Poco M5s. The Poco M5 was sold in 4/64 GB, 4/128 GB and 6/128 GB memory configurations, while the Redmi 11 Prime was sold in 4/64 GB and 6/128 GB. All models have a LPDDR4X type RAM and UFS 2.2 type storage, which can be expanded via a microSD card by up to 1 TB.

The phones feature a non-removable lithium polymer battery with 5000 mAh capacity and 18 W fast charging support.

Both models have a triple rear camera with a 50 MP, f/1.8 wide-angle lens with PDAF, a 2 MP, f/2.4 macro lens and a 2 MP, f/2.4 depth sensor. Additionally, the global Poco M5 has a front camera with a resolution of 5 MP and f/2.2 aperture, while the Poco M5 for the Indian market has 8 MP and f/2.0, and the Redmi 11 Prime has 8 MP and f/2.2 respectively. Both rear and front cameras can record video at up to 1080p@30fps.

The phones feature a 6.58-inch display with IPS LCD technology at Full HD+ (2408 × 1080; ~401 ppi) image resolution, a 90 Hz refresh rate, and a waterdrop notch.

=== Software ===
Initially, the Poco M5 was released with MIUI 13 for Poco and the Redmi 11 Prime was released with MIUI 13 custom skin. Both interfaces are based on Android 12. Later both models were updated to Xiaomi HyperOS based on Android 14.
