= POCO M4 Pro 5G =

Android-based smartphone

POCO M4 Pro 5G Redmi Note 11 5G (Redmi Note 11T in India)
- Brand: POCO, Redmi
- Manufacturer: Xiaomi
- Type: Phablet
- Series: POCO M series / Redmi Note series
- First released: Redmi Note 11 5G: 28 October 2021; 4 years ago POCO M4 Pro 5G: 9 November 2021; 4 years ago Redmi Note 11T: 30 November 2021; 4 years ago
- Availability by region: M4 Pro 5G: Worldwide; Redmi Note 11 5G: China; Redmi Note 11T: India
- Predecessor: POCO M3 Pro 5G
- Successor: POCO M6 Pro; Redmi Note 12 5G
- Related: POCO M4 Pro; Redmi Note 11; POCO M4 5G
- Compatible networks: GSM, 3G, LTE, 5G
- Form factor: Slate
- Dimensions: 163.6 mm × 75.8 mm × 8.8 mm (6.44 in × 2.98 in × 0.35 in)
- Weight: 195 g (6.88 oz)
- Operating system: Original: M4 Pro 5G: Android 11 with MIUI 12.5 for POCO; Redmi Note 11 5G/11T: Android 11 with MIUI 12.5; Current: Android 13 with HyperOS 1
- System-on-chip: MediaTek MT6833 Dimensity 810 5G (7 nm)
- CPU: Octa-core (2×2.4 GHz Cortex-A76 & 6×2.0 GHz Cortex-A55)
- GPU: Mali-G57 MC2
- Memory: 4 GB, 6 GB, 8 GB LPDDR4X
- Storage: M4 Pro 5G/Redmi Note 11T: 64 GB, 128 GB; Redmi Note 11 5G: 128 GB, 256 GB; UFS 2.2
- Removable storage: MicroSDXC up to 1 TB
- Battery: Non-removable Li-Po 5000 mAh
- Charging: 33W fast charging, 100% in 59 min
- Rear camera: 50 MP, f/1.8, 26mm (wide), PDAF + 8 MP, f/2.2 (ultrawide); LED flash, HDR, panorama Video: 1080p@30/60fps
- Front camera: 16 MP, f/2.5 (wide), 1/3.06", 1.0 µm HDR, panorama Video: 1080p@30fps
- Display: IPS LCD, 6.6 inches, 2400 × 1080 pixels (Full HD+), 20:9 ratio, 399 ppi, 90 Hz
- Connectivity: USB-C 2.0, 3.5 mm audio jack, Bluetooth 5.1 (A2DP, LE), NFC (market dependent), Infrared port, FM radio, Wi-Fi 802.11 a/b/g/n/ac (dual-band, Wi-Fi Direct, hotspot), GPS, A-GPS, GLONASS, GALILEO, BeiDou
- Data inputs: Side-mounted fingerprint scanner, accelerometer, gyroscope, proximity sensor, compass

The POCO M4 Pro 5G is an Android-based smartphone developed by POCO, a sub-brand of Xiaomi. It belongs to the POCO M series and was announced on November 9, 2021. A nearly identical model, the Redmi Note 11 5G, is sold in China with a slightly redesigned back panel. In India, the Redmi Note 11 5G is marketed under the name Redmi Note 11T.

== Release and pricing ==
The POCO M4 Pro was unveiled in November and launched in select Asian markets. The base model—featuring 4GB of RAM and 64GB of storage—was priced at £239 in the United Kingdom and €269 across continental Europe. A higher-tier variant with 6GB of RAM and 128GB of storage was also made available. Although POCO does not officially distribute its products in North America, the device became accessible in the region via third-party resellers on platforms like Amazon.

== Design ==
The front display is protected by Corning Gorilla Glass 3. The chassis is constructed of matte plastic, with glossy finishes used for the Milky Way Blue option on the Redmi Note 11 5G and Stardust White on the Note 11T.

The layout of the camera module resembles the Redmi 10 and the Chinese variants of the Redmi Note 11 Pro. Additionally, the POCO M4 Pro features a design language reminiscent of the POCO M3, incorporating a large black horizontal accent strip across the upper rear panel displaying the POCO branding.

The bottom edge houses a USB-C port, a 3.5 mm audio jack, a loudspeaker, and a primary microphone. The top edge includes a secondary microphone, an infrared port, and a secondary loudspeaker for stereo audio. The left side holds a hybrid dual-SIM card slot which supports microSD expansion up to 1 TB. The right side features the volume rocker and a power button that integrates a side-mounted fingerprint scanner.

The smartphones were produced in the following color configurations:

- POCO M4 Pro 5G: Power Black, POCO Yellow, and Cool Blue.
- Redmi Note 11 5G: Mysterious Black, Milky Way Blue, and Mint Green.
- Redmi Note 11T: Matte Black, Stardust White, and Aquamarine Blue.

== Specifications ==
=== Hardware ===
The devices are powered by a MediaTek Dimensity 810 system-on-chip and a Mali-G57 MC2 graphics processor. It features a 5000 mAh non-removable battery with support for 33W Pro fast charging.

=== Display ===
The phone features a 6.6-inch IPS LCD display with a Full HD+ resolution (2400 × 1080 pixels). It has a 20:9 aspect ratio, a pixel density of 399 ppi, and a 90 Hz refresh rate. The display includes a centered punch-hole cutout for the front-facing camera. Unlike its predecessor, the M3 Pro 5G, the M4 Pro 5G includes support for the wider DCI-P3 color gamut. The panel incorporates a dynamic 90 Hz refresh rate that automatically adjusts between 50 Hz, 60 Hz, and 90 Hz depending on the on-screen content.

Poco advertised that the M4 Pro 5G would provide an optimal gaming and video playback experience, supported by its 240 Hz maximum touch sampling rate.

=== Camera ===
The rear camera system consists of a dual setup: a 50 MP wide-angle main camera with an aperture of f/1.8 and phase-detection autofocus (PDAF), accompanied by an 8 MP ultrawide camera with an aperture of f/2.2. The rear camera configuration supports video recording up to 1080p at 30 or 60 frames per second. The front-facing camera features a 16 MP sensor with an aperture of f/2.5 and is capable of capturing 1080p video at 30 frames per second.

=== Storage and Memory ===
The devices were sold in varying configurations:

- POCO M4 Pro 5G: 4 GB/64 GB, 4 GB/128 GB, 6 GB/128 GB, and 8 GB/128 GB.
- Redmi Note 11 5G: 4 GB/128 GB, 6 GB/128 GB, 8 GB/128 GB, and 8 GB/256 GB.
- Redmi Note 11T: 4 GB/64 GB, 6 GB/64 GB, 6 GB/128 GB, and 8 GB/128 GB.

=== Software ===
The smartphones shipped originally with MIUI 12.5 based on Android 11. They received subsequent updates up to HyperOS 1 based on Android 13.

== Reception ==
Tech Advisor reviewer Thomas Newton noted that the Poco M4 Pro 5G's camera system delivered mixed results. Newton found that the autofocus frequently struggled at various distances and required a steady hand to avoid blur, a limitation he attributed partly to the phone's basic camera software. However, he praised the device's natural color reproduction, though he noted that the images could appear slightly desaturated on the phone's LCD display.
