= Redmi 15 =

Budget smartphone series by Xiaomi

Redmi 15 Redmi 15 5G (Redmi Note 15R in China) Poco M7 Poco M7 Plus
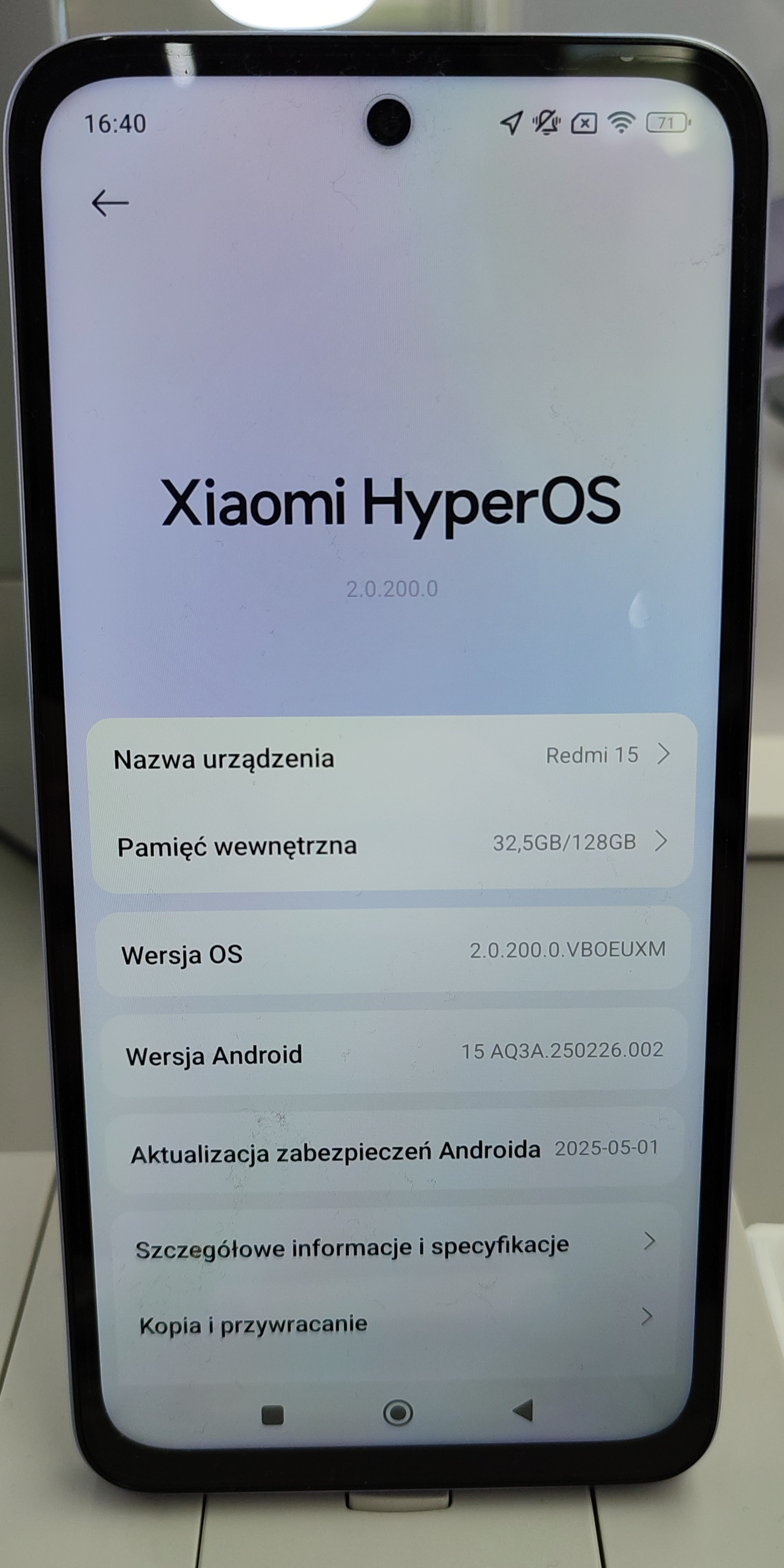
- The front of the Redmi 15
- Brand: Redmi/Poco
- Manufacturer: Xiaomi
- Type: Smartphone
- Series: Redmi/Redmi Note/Poco M
- First released: Redmi 15/5G: 1 August 2025; 15 months ago Redmi Note 15R: 23 August 2025; 14 months ago Poco M7/Plus: 13 August 2025; 15 months ago
- Predecessor: Redmi 13
- Successor: Redmi 17; Poco M8
- Related: Redmi 15C; Redmi Note 15; Poco M7 5G; Poco M7 Pro 5G
- Compatible networks: Redmi 15/Poco M7: GSM / HSPA / LTE; Redmi 15 5G/Note 15R/Poco M7 Plus: GSM / HSPA / LTE / 5G
- Form factor: Slate
- Operating system: Original: Xiaomi HyperOS 2.2 based on Android 15; Current: Xiaomi HyperOS 3.1 based on Android 16
- System-on-chip: Redmi 15/Poco M7: Qualcomm Snapdragon 685; Redmi 15 5G/Poco M7 Plus: Qualcomm Snapdragon 6s Gen 3
- Memory: Redmi 15/Poco M7: 6/8 GB; Redmi 15 5G/Poco M7 Plus: 4/6/8 GB; UFS 2.2
- Storage: Redmi 15/Poco M7: 6/8 GB; Redmi 15 5G/Poco M7 Plus: 4/6/8 GB
- Removable storage: Redmi 15/Redmi 15 5G/Poco M7: microSD up to 2 TB; Redmi 15 5G (India)/Note 15R/Poco M7 Plus: none
- SIM: Nano-SIM; Redmi 15/Redmi 15 5G/Poco M7: hybrid dual SIM; Redmi 15 5G (India)/Note 15R/Poco M7 Plus: dual SIM
- Battery: Si/C Li-ion 7000 mAh, non-removable
- Charging: Up to 100W wired, up to 12W reverse wired
- Rear camera: Dual-Camera Setup; Primary: OmniVision PureCel®Plus‑S OV50D40; 50 MP (5P lens), f/1.8, 29mm (standard), FoV 75.6°, 1/2.88", 0.612 µm, PDAF; Auxiliary lens; Camera features: LED flash, HDR; Video recording: 1080p@30fps
- Front camera: GalaxyCore GC08A8; 8 MP (4P lens), f/2.0, 26mm (wide), 1/4.0", 1.12 µm, FF; Camera features: HDR; Video recording: 1080p@30fps
- Display: 6.9 in IPS LCD, 144 Hz, Full HD+
- Connectivity: Wi-Fi, Bluetooth, USB-C 2.0, GPS
- Water resistance: IP64 (dust and splash resistant)
- Model: Redmi 15: 25062RN2DA, 25062RN2DE, 25062RN2DL, 25062RN2DY; Redmi 15 5G: 25057RN09G, 25057RN09E, 25057RN09I; Redmi Note 15R: 25062RN2DA, 25062RN2DE, 25062RN2DL, 25062RN2DY; Poco M7: 25062PC34G, 25062PC34E; Poco M7 Plus: 25057PC09I
- Codename: Redmi 15/Poco M7: creek Redmi 15 5G/Note 15R/Poco M7 Plus: spring
- Made in: Redmi 15/Note 15R/Poco M7: China; Redmi 15 5G: China, India; Poco M7 Plus: India

The Redmi 15 and Redmi 15 5G (stylized and marketed as the REDMI 15 and REDMI 15 5G) are budget Android smartphones manufactured by Xiaomi under its Redmi sub-brand. The smartphones are positioned between entry-level and mid-range segment and were launched globally on August 1, 2025.

On August 13, 2025 the Redmi 15 and Redmi 15 5G were introduced under Poco brand as the Poco M7 (not to be confused with the Poco M7 5G) and Poco M7 Plus respectively with the difference in design. Also, on August 23, 2025 Redmi 15 5G was introduced for the Chinese market as the Redmi Note 15R.

== Design ==
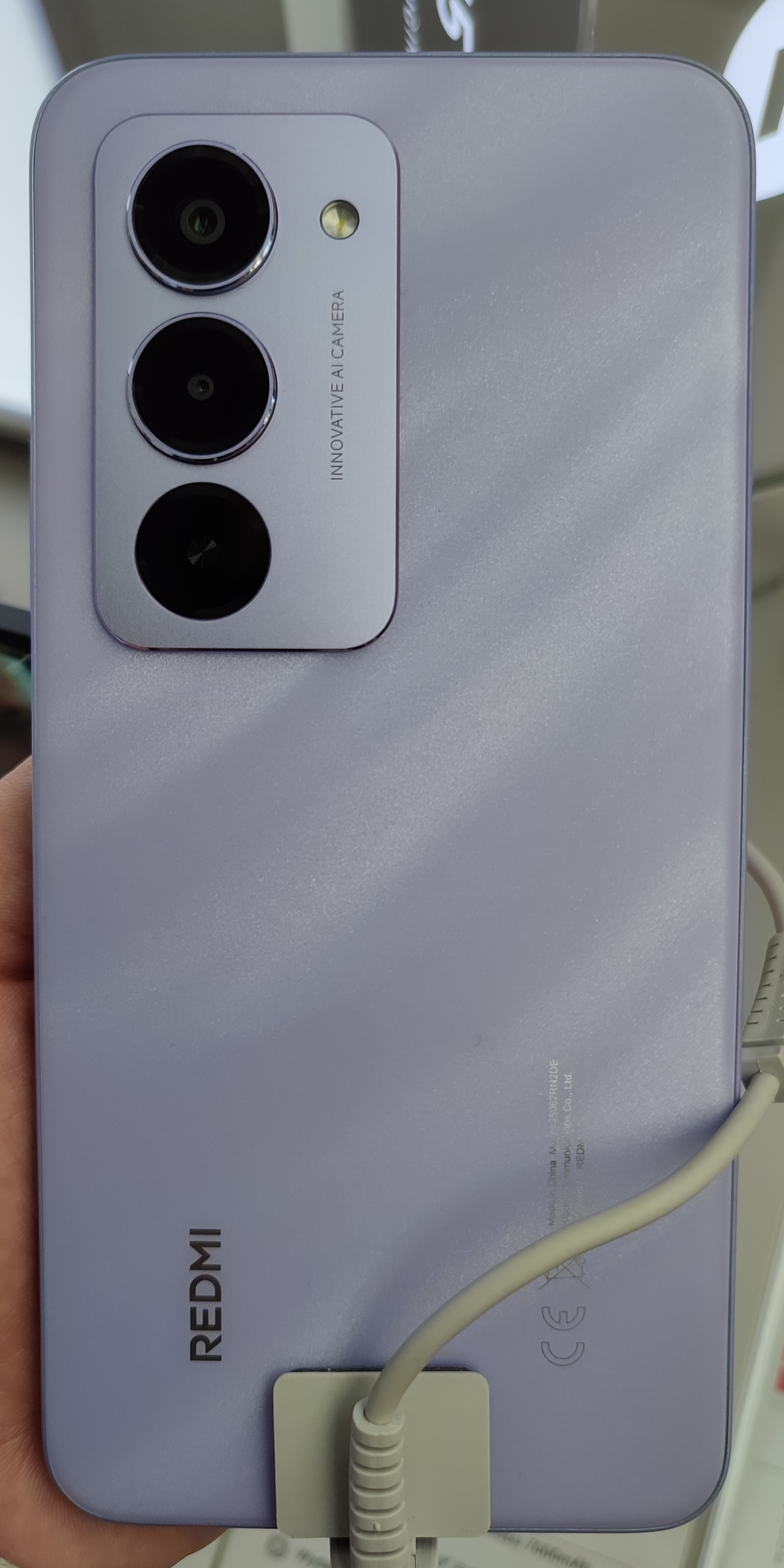
The back of the Redmi 15

The front is made of Corning Gorilla Glass 3, while the back and frame are made of matte plastic. The design incorporates an IP64 rating for dust and splash resistance.

The Redmi 15 and Redmi 15 5G include a rectangular aluminium camera island with an LED flash and three rings, two of which are camera lenses and one of which is ornamental. On the other hand, Poco M7 and Poco M7 Plus feature an ellipsoidal camera island with two lenses.

On the bottom of smartphones, there is a USB-C port, speaker, and microphone. On the top, there is an infrared blaster. On the left, there is a hybrid Dual SIM tray (SIM1 + SIM 2 or SIM1 + microSD) on the Redmi 15, global version of the Redmi 15 5G and Poco M7 or a normal Dual SIM tray on the Indian Redmi 15 5G, Note 15R and Poco M7 Plus. On the right, there is the volume rocker and the power button with a mounted fingerprint scanner. Unlike previous models, the smartphones do not feature a 3.5 mm audio jack.

The smartphones are offered in the following colour variants:

Redmi 15		Redmi 15 5G		Redmi Note 15R		Poco M7		Poco M7 Plus	
Color	Name	Color	Name	Color	Name	Color	Name	Color	Name
	Midnight Black		Midnight Black		Shadow Black		Black		Carbon Black
	Sandy Purple		Sandy Purple		Sandy Purple		Blue		Aqua Blue
	Titan Gray		Titan Gray		Glacier White		Silver		Chrome Silver
			Frosted White						
			Ripple Green						

== Specifications ==
=== Hardware ===
The Redmi 15 and Poco M7 are equipped with the Qualcomm Snapdragon 685 system on a chip, which was previously used in the Redmi Note 12 and Redmi Note 13, while the Redmi 15 5G/Note 15R and Poco M7 Plus are powered by the Qualcomm Snapdragon 6s Gen 3. RAM and storage options range from 4 GB / 128 GB to 8 GB / 256 GB configurations.

The smartphones feature a 6.9-inch IPS LCD with Full HD+ resolution and a 144 Hz refresh rate.

The devices come with a 7000 mAh battery that supports 33 W wired charging and 18 W reverse wired charging, enabling the smartphone to act as a powerbank.

The smartphones include a dual rear-camera setup, with a 50 MP primary sensor and a secondary sensor, likely for depth capabilities. The front-facing camera features an 8 MP resolution. The camera software includes standard photography features for the segment.

=== Software ===
All models run Xiaomi HyperOS 2.2, a custom Android-based operating system, built on Android 15. The OS includes system-level Google service integration and selected artificial intelligence features, depending on the variant and market. Later, the smartphones were updated to Xiaomi HyperOS 3.1 based on Android 16.

=== Additional features ===
The device supports USB-C connectivity, side-mounted fingerprint sensors, and standard audio output through headphones or Bluetooth.

== See also ==
- Redmi Note 13
- List of Xiaomi products
- Android version history
