= Redmi 12 =

Android smartphone made by Xiaomi

Redmi 12 Redmi 12 5G/Note 12R Poco M6 Pro 5G (Redmi 12R in China)
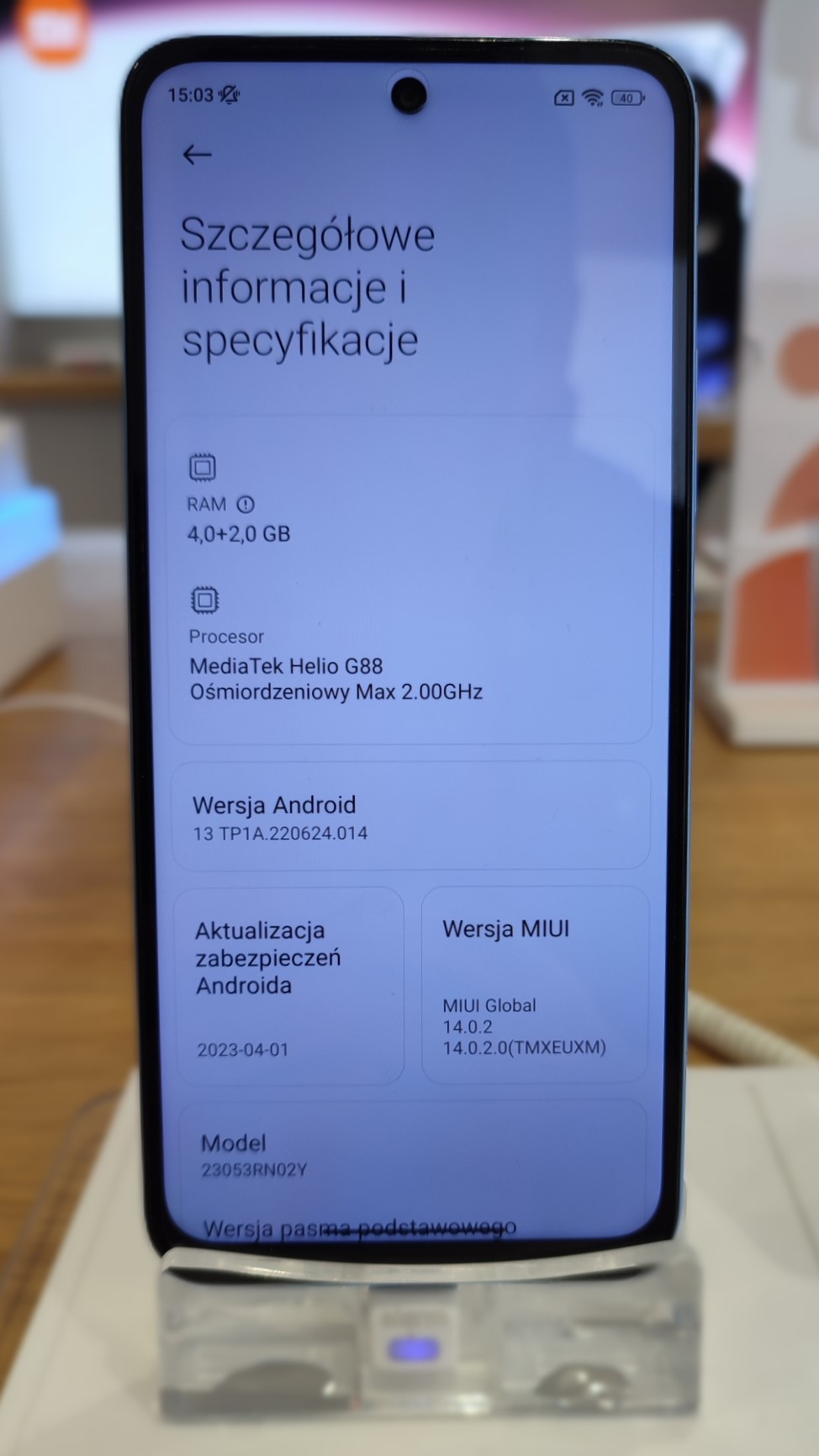
- The front of Redmi 12
- Brand: Redmi, Poco
- Manufacturer: Xiaomi
- Type: Phablet
- Series: Redmi
- Predecessor: Redmi 10; Redmi 10 5G; Poco M4 Pro 5G
- Successor: Redmi 13; Redmi 13R; Poco M7 Pro 5G
- Related: Redmi 12C; Redmi Note 12; Poco M6; Poco M6 Pro
- Compatible networks: 12: 2G / 3G / 4G LTE; 12 5G/Note 12R/Poco M6 Pro 5G: 2G / 3G / 4G LTE / 5G
- Form factor: Slate
- Colors: 12/5G: Midnight Black, Sky Blue, Moonstone Silver; 12/5G (India): Jade Black, Pastel Blue, Polar Silver; 12 5G (China): Star Rock Gray, Ice Porcelain White; Note 12R: Midnight Black, Time Blue, Sky Fantasy; 12R: Obsidian Black, Smoke Green; Poco M6 Pro 5G: Power Black, Forest Green
- Dimensions: 168.6 mm (6.64 in) H 76.3 mm (3.00 in) W 8.2 mm (0.32 in) D
- Weight: 12: 198.5 g (7.00 oz); 12 5G/12R/Note 12R/Poco M6 Pro 5G: 199 g (7.0 oz)
- Operating system: Initial: 12/5G/12R/Note 12R: Android 13 with MIUI 14; Poco M6 Pro 5G: Android 13 with MIUI 14 for Poco; Current: Android 15 with Xiaomi HyperOS 2
- System-on-chip: 12: MediaTek Helio G88 (12nm); 12 5G/12R/Note 12R/Poco M6 Pro 5G: Qualcomm Snapdragon 4 Gen 2 (4nm)
- CPU: 12: Octa-core (2x2.0 GHz Cortex-A75 & 6x1.8 GHz Cortex-A55); 12 5G/12R/Note 12R/Poco M6 Pro 5G: Octa-core (2x2.2 GHz Cortex-A78 & 6x2.0 GHz Cortex-A55)
- GPU: 12: Mali-G52 MC2; 12 5G/12R/Note 12R/Poco M6 Pro 5G: Adreno 613
- Memory: 12/5G/Note 12R: 4, 6 and 8 GB RAM; 12R: 4 GB RAM; Poco M6 Pro 5G: 4 and 6 GB RAM; LPDDR4X
- Storage: 12: 128 and 256 GB eMMC 5.1; 12 5G/Note 12R: 128 and 256 GB UFS 2.2; 12R: 128 GB UFS 2.2; Poco M6 Pro 5G: 64 and 128 GB UFS 2.2
- Removable storage: microSDXC (up to 1 TB)
- SIM: Hybrid Dual SIM (Nano-SIM, dual stand-by)
- Battery: Li-Ion 5000 mAh
- Charging: Fast charging 18W
- Rear camera: 12: 50 MP, f/1.8 (wide), PDAF; 8 MP, f/2.2 120˚ (ultrawide); 2 MP, f/2.4 (depth); 12 5G/12R/Note 12R/Poco M6 Pro 5G: 50 MP, f/1.8 (wide), PDAF; 2 MP, f/2.4 (depth); LED flash, HDR; 1080p@30fps
- Front camera: 12: 8 MP, f/2.1 (wide); 12 5G (India)/Poco M6 Pro 5G: 8 MP, f/2.0 (wide); 12 5G/12R/Note 12R: 5 MP, f/2.2 (wide), 1/5", 1.12µm; 1080p@30fps
- Display: 6.79 in (172 mm); 1080 x 2460 px resolution (~396 ppi density); IPS LCD, 90Hz, 550 nits (peak)
- Sound: Speaker
- Connectivity: Wi-Fi 802.11 a/b/g/n/ac, dual-band Bluetooth 5.3, A2DP, LE
- Data inputs: Multi-touch screen; USB Type-C 2.0; Fingerprint scanner (side-mounted); Accelerometer; Proximity sensor; Compass
- Water resistance: IP53
- Model: 12: 3053RN02A, 23053RN02I, 23053RN02L, 23053RN02Y; 12 5G: 23076RN4BI, 23076RN8DY, 23077RABDC, 23076RA4BR, XIG03, A401XM; Note 12R: 23076RA4BC; Poco M6 Pro 5G: 23076PC4BI
- Codename: 12: fire; 12 (NFC): heat; 12 5G: river; 12 5G (India)/12R/Note 12R/Poco M6 Pro 5G: sky
- Website: www.mi.com/global/product/redmi-12/ www.mi.com/in/product/redmi-12-5g/ www.mi.com/redmi-12r

The Redmi 12 and Redmi 12 5G are Android-based smartphones marketed as part of the Redmi series by a sub-brand of Xiaomi Inc with the same name. The 4G model was announced on June 15, 2023 and the 5G model was announced on August 1, 2023.

In China, the Redmi 12 5G is also sold as the Redmi Note 12R. Later, the Redmi 12 5G was released under the Poco brand as the Poco M6 Pro 5G with different back designs and colors. Also, several months later the Poco M6 Pro 5G was released in China as the Redmi 12R.

== Design ==
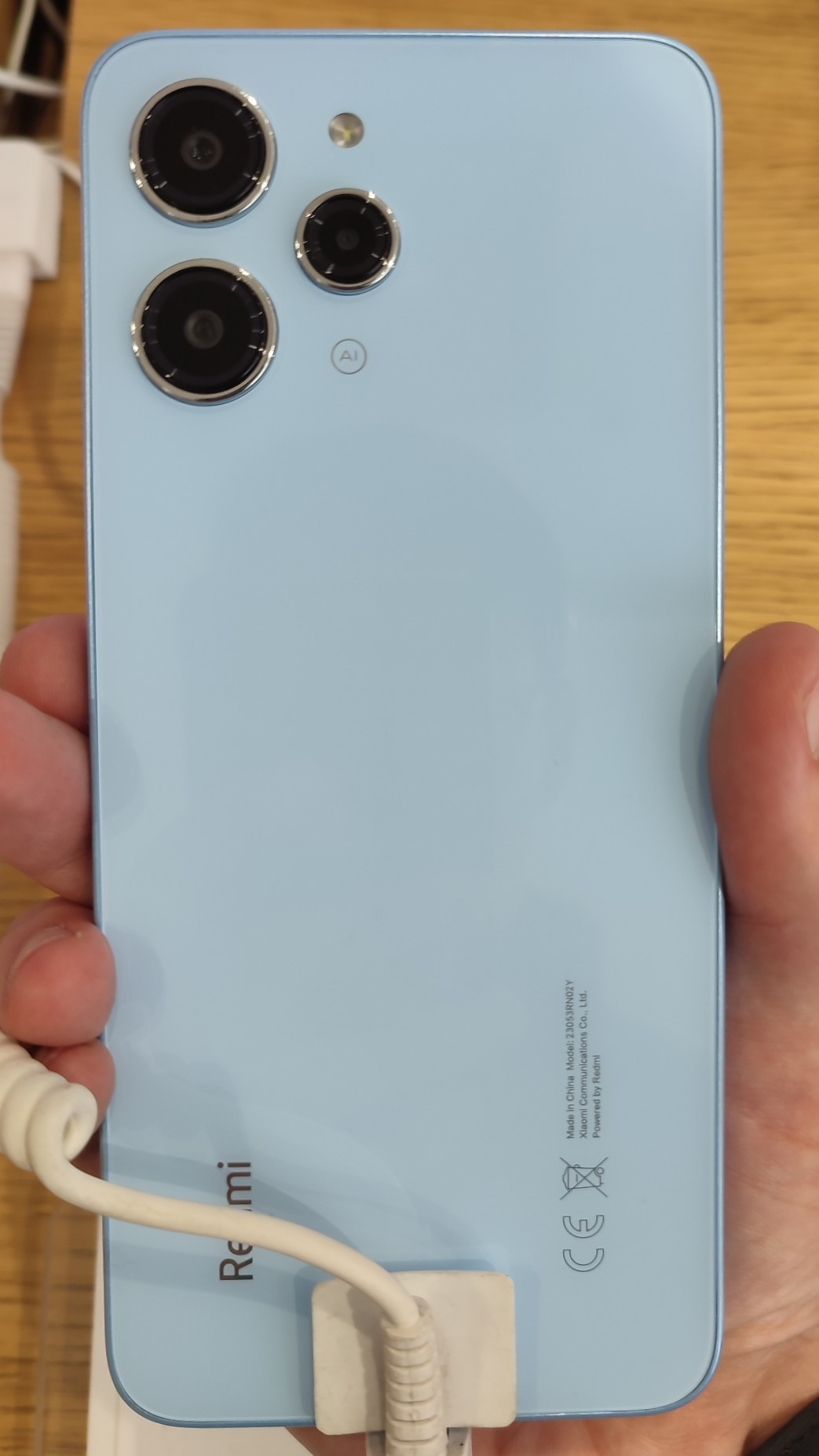
The back of Redmi 12 in Sky Blue

The front and back are made of Gorilla Glass, while the frame is made of plastic.

On the bottom of smartphones, there is a USB-C port, speaker, and microphone. On the top, there is 3.5mm audio jack and infrared blaster. On the left, there is a hybrid Dual SIM tray (SIM1 + SIM 2 or SIM1 + microSD). On the right, there is the volume rocker and the power button with a mounted fingerprint scanner.

The Redmi 12 and Redmi 12 5G on the global market are available in 3 colors: Midnight Black, Sky Blue, and Polar Silver. On the Indian market, these models are available in the same colors under other names: Jade Black, Pastel Blue, and Polar Silver respectively.

The Redmi 12 5G on the Chinese market is available in Star Rock Gray and Ice Porcelain White.

The Redmi Note 12R is available in 3 colors: Midnight Black, Time Blue, and Sky Fantasy (Silver).

The Redmi 12R is available in Obsidian Black and Smoke Green. Also, the Poco M6 Pro 5G has the same colors but under other names: Power Black and Forest Green respectively.

== Specifications ==
=== Hardware ===
==== Chipset ====
The Redmi 12 is equipped with the same octa-core MediaTek Helio G88 SoC as the Redmi 10. On the other hand, the Redmi 12 5G/Note 12R and Redmi 12R/Poco M6 Pro 5G are the first smartphones that feature the Qualcomm Snapdragon 4 Gen 2 with 5G support.

==== Camera ====
The Redmi 12 features a triple rear camera setup with a 50 MP, f/1.8 wide-angle lens, an 8 MP, f/2.2 ultrawide-angles lens, and a 2 MP, f/2.4 macro camera. Also, the smartphone has an 8 MP front-facing camera.

Other models feature dual rear camera setup with a 50 MP, f/1.8 wide-angle lens a 2 MP, f/2.4 depth sensor. Additionally, the global version of the Redmi 12 5G, Redmi 12R, and Redmi Note 12R have 5 MP, f/2.2 front camera while the Indian version of Redmi 12 5G and Poco M6 Pro 5G have 8 MP, f/2.0 front camera.

All models' rear and front cameras can record video at up to 1080p@30fps.

==== Display ====
The smartphones have a 6.79-inch (172 mm) IPS LCD display at FHD+ (2460 × 1080 px, ~396 ppi) resolution, 90 Hz refresh rate and a centered circular cutout for the front-facing camera.

==== Battery ====
The models feature a non-removable battery with 5000 mAh capacity and 18W fast charging support.

==== Memory ====
The Redmi 12, 12 5G, and Note 12R are sold in 4/128, 6/128, 8/128, and 8/256 GB, the Redmi 12R is sold in 4/128 GB, and the Poco M6 Pro 5G is sold in 4/64, 4/128 and 6/128 GB.

The Redmi 12 has an eMMC 5.1 storage type, while the other models feature a UFS 2.2 storage type. Also, all models have LPDDR4X RAM type and microSD support up to 1 TB.

=== Software ===
The Redmi models were released with MIUI 14, while the Poco M6 Pro 5G was released with MIUI 14 for Poco. Both ROMs are based on Android 13. Later, all models were updated to Xiaomi HyperOS 2, which is based on Android 15.
