= Redmi 13 =

Android smartphone made by Xiaomi

Redmi 13 Redmi 13x Redmi 13 5G Redmi Note 13R POCO M6 POCO M6 Plus
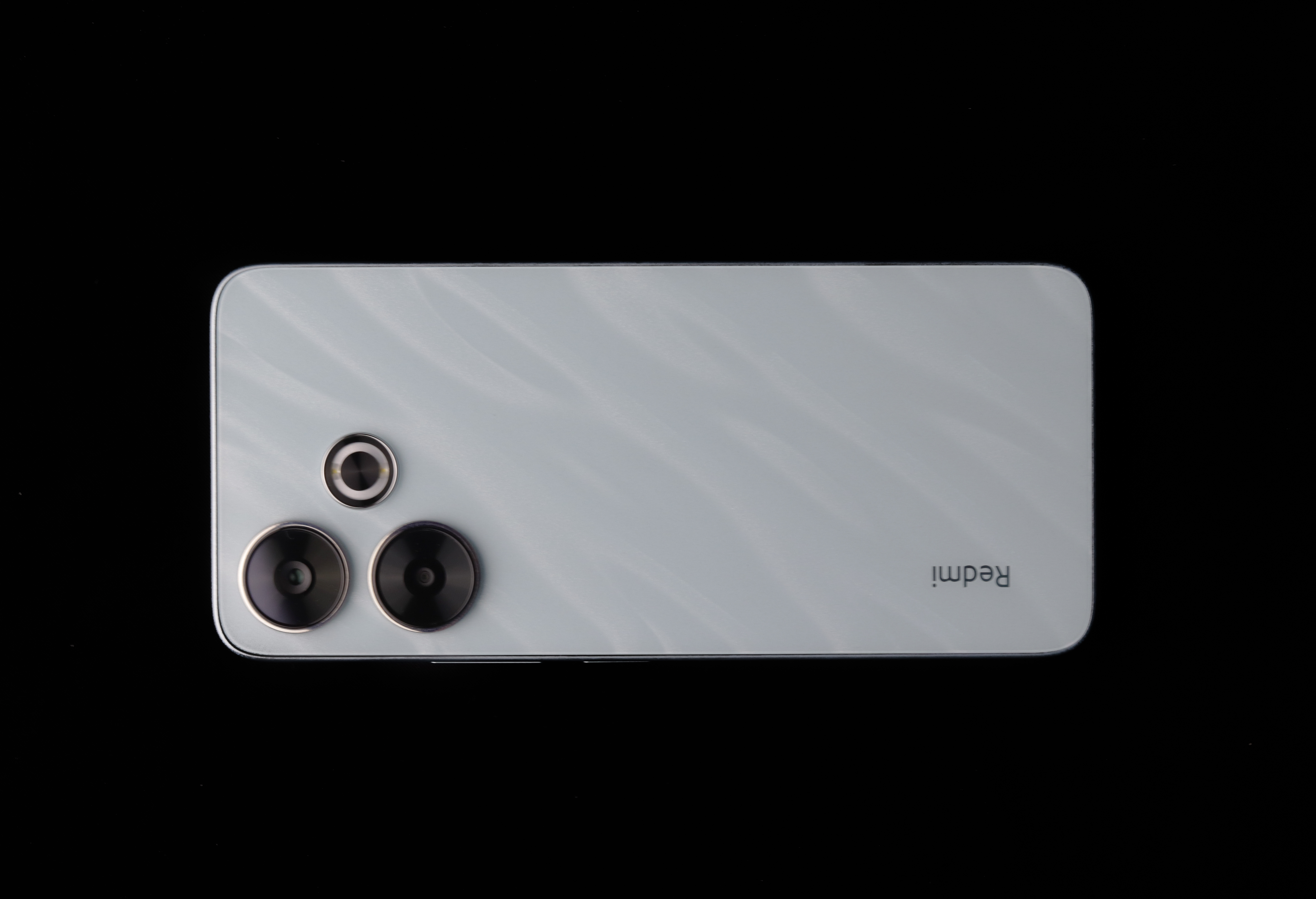
- Rear panel of the Redmi 13 in Ocean Blue
- Brand: Redmi, POCO
- Manufacturer: Xiaomi
- Type: Smartphone
- Series: Redmi / Redmi Note / POCO M series
- Predecessor: Redmi 12 / POCO M5
- Successor: Redmi 15
- Related: Redmi 13C, Redmi Note 13, POCO M6 Pro
- Form factor: Slate
- Operating system: Original: Android 14 with HyperOS; Current: Android 16 with HyperOS 3
- System-on-chip: 4G models: MediaTek Helio G91 (12 nm); 5G models: Qualcomm Snapdragon 4 Gen 2 AE (4 nm)
- CPU: Octa-core
- GPU: Mali-G52 MC2 (4G); Adreno 613 (5G)
- Memory: 4–12 GB LPDDR4X
- Storage: 128–512 GB (eMMC 5.1 / UFS 2.2)
- Removable storage: microSDXC (up to 1 TB)
- Battery: 5030 mAh Li-Po
- Charging: 33W wired
- Rear camera: 108 MP (HM6) or 50 MP (Note 13R) + 2 MP macro
- Front camera: 13 MP (8 MP on Note 13R)
- Display: 6.79 in IPS LCD, 2460 × 1080 (FHD+), 90Hz / 120Hz
- Sound: Mono speaker, 3.5 mm audio jack
- Connectivity: USB-C 2.0, Wi-Fi ac, Bluetooth 5.x, GPS, NFC (market dependent), IR blaster
- Water resistance: IP53

Redmi 13 and Redmi 13 5G are budget smartphones developed by Xiaomi under its Redmi sub-brand. The Redmi 13 was announced on 3 June 2024, while the Redmi 13 5G was introduced on 9 July 2024. The primary differences between the 4G and 5G variants include the processor, storage type, and display refresh rate.

On 28 March 2025, the Redmi 13x was introduced, featuring largely identical specifications to the 4G Redmi 13 but with a redesigned rear panel.

In China, the Redmi 13 5G is marketed as the Redmi Note 13R, featuring a different primary camera sensor. Under Xiaomi's Poco (smartphone) brand, the devices were also released as the POCO M6 (not to be confused with the POCO M6 5G) and POCO M6 Plus, corresponding to the Redmi 13 and Redmi 13 5G respectively, with minor cosmetic differences.

== Design ==
The display is protected by Corning Gorilla Glass 3. The rear panel is made of glass, while the frame is constructed from matte plastic. All models are rated IP53 for dust and splash resistance.

The Redmi 13x adopts a rear design similar to the Redmi Note 14, while the other variants resemble the POCO F6.

== Specifications ==
=== Hardware ===
The Redmi 13, 13x and POCO M6 are powered by the MediaTek Helio G91 with a Mali-G52 MC2 GPU. Compared to the Helio G88, the G91 features an improved ISP supporting 108 MP sensors.

The Redmi 13 5G, Note 13R and POCO M6 Plus use the Qualcomm Snapdragon 4 Gen 2 AE (Accelerated Edition), paired with an Adreno 613 GPU.

=== Battery ===
All models feature a 5030 mAh battery with 33W fast charging support.

=== Camera ===
The Redmi 13, 13x, 13 5G, POCO M6 and M6 Plus feature a dual rear camera system consisting of a 108 MP Samsung ISOCELL HM6 (f/1.8, PDAF) and a 2 MP macro lens (f/2.4). The front camera is 13 MP (f/2.5).

The Redmi Note 13R instead uses a 50 MP main camera (f/1.8, PDAF) with a 2 MP macro sensor and an 8 MP front camera.

All models support 1080p video recording at 30fps.

=== Display ===
The devices feature a 6.79-inch IPS LCD with a resolution of 2460 × 1080 (FHD+), 20.5:9 aspect ratio, and 396 ppi pixel density. The Redmi 13, 13x and POCO M6 support a 90 Hz refresh rate, while the Redmi 13 5G, Note 13R and POCO M6 Plus support 120 Hz.

=== Software ===
All models shipped with HyperOS based on Android 14 and were later updated to HyperOS 3 based on Android 16.

Preceded by Redmi 12 / 12 5G	Redmi 13 / 13 5G; 2024	Succeeded by Redmi 15 / 15 5G
Preceded by Redmi Note 12R	Redmi Note 13R; 2024	Succeeded by Redmi Note 15R
Preceded by POCO M5	POCO M6; 2024	Succeeded by POCO M7
New title	POCO M6 Plus; 2024	Succeeded by POCO M7 Plus
