= POCO M6 Pro 5G =

Android smartphone

Xiaomi Poco M6 Pro
- Brand: Poco
- Manufacturer: Xiaomi
- Type: Smartphone
- Series: Poco M series
- First released: August 5, 2023
- Availability by region: August 5, 2023
- Predecessor: Poco M5 Pro (implied)
- Related: Redmi Note 12R Poco M6; Poco M6 Pro (Global)
- Compatible networks: GSM, HSPA, LTE, 5G
- Form factor: Slate
- Colors: Power Black, Forest Green
- Dimensions: 168.6 mm (6.64 in) H 76.3 mm (3.00 in) W 8.2 mm (0.32 in) D
- Weight: 199 g (7.0 oz)
- Operating system: Android 13 with MIUI 14
- System-on-chip: Qualcomm Snapdragon 4 Gen 2 (4 nm)
- CPU: Octa-core (2x2.2 GHz Cortex-A78 & 6x1.95 GHz Cortex-A55)
- GPU: Adreno 613
- Memory: 4 GB, 6 GB, or 8 GB LPDDR4X
- Storage: 64 GB, 128 GB, or 256 GB UFS 2.2
- Removable storage: microSDXC (uses shared SIM slot)
- Battery: 5,000 mAh Li-Po (non-removable)
- Charging: 18W wired, Power Delivery fast-charging
- Rear camera: 50 MP, f/1.8 (wide), PDAF; 2 MP, f/2.4 (depth)
- Front camera: 8 MP, f/2.0 (wide), 1.12µm
- Display: 6.79 in (172 mm) IPS LCD, 90Hz, 550 nits 2460 × 1080 pixels (~396 ppi)
- Sound: Loudspeaker, 3.5 mm jack, 24-bit/192kHz Hi-Res audio
- Connectivity: Wi-Fi 802.11 a/b/g/n/ac, dual-band Bluetooth 5.3, A2DP, LE; GPS, GLONASS, GALILEO, BDS; Infrared port USB-C
- Data inputs: List: Fingerprint scanner (side-mounted); Accelerometer; Compass; virtual proximity sensing
- Water resistance: IP53 (dust and splash resistant)
- Model: 23076PC4BI
- Codename: sky

The POCO M6 Pro is a budget Android smartphone designed and manufactued by Xiaomi under the sub-brand POCO. It was released in August 2023 in the Indian market followed by the exclusive Flipkart on August 9, before the global release of the 4G variant in January 2024.

== Specifications ==
=== Design ===
The front and back sides are made of glass and was protected by Corning Gorilla Glass and a plastic frame. The M6 Pro measures 168.6 x 76.3 x 8.2 mm and weighs 199 grams and housed with an IP53 screen protector. It was available at Power Black and Forest Green color options.

=== Hardware ===
The device is powered by the Qualcomm Snapdragon 4 Gen 2 chipset, built on a 4nm process. The octa-core processor consists of two 2.2 GHz Cortex-A78 cores and six 1.95 GHz Cortex-A55 cores, paired with an Adreno 613 GPU.

The Poco M6 Pro is housed with a 6.79-inch IPS LCD panel with a 90Hz refresh rate and a peak brightness of 550 nits. It has a resolution of 1080 x 2460 pixels, resulting in a pixel density of approximately 396 ppi.

The hardware is supported by a 5000 mAh non-removable Li-Po battery, which supports 18W wired charging via Power Delivery (PD). Additional hardware features include a side-mounted fingerprint sensor, a 3.5mm headphone jack with 24-bit/192kHz Hi-Res audio support, and an infrared port.

=== Storage ===
Storage and memory configurations include a 64GB, a 128GB or a 256GB UFS 2.2 internal storage, a 4GB, 6GB, or an 8GB RAM and microSDXC for expandable storage up to 1 terabyte via shared SIM slot.

=== Cameras ===
The M6 Pro features a dual camera setup consisting of a 50 MP wide lens with an f/1.8 aperture and Phase Detection Auto Focus (PDAF), supported by an auxiliary lens and a 2MP depth sensor. It includes features such as an LED flash and HDR, and is capable of recording 1080p video at 30fps.

In the front it featured an 8 MP wide-angle lens with an f/2.0 aperture and 1.12µm pixel size. It supports HDR and 1080p video recording at 30fps.

=== Software ===
The Poco M6 Pro shipped with Android 13 as its base operating system, running Xiaomi's proprietary MIUI 14 interface.
