= Poco M7 Pro 5G =

Android-based smartphones manufactured by Xiaomi Inc.

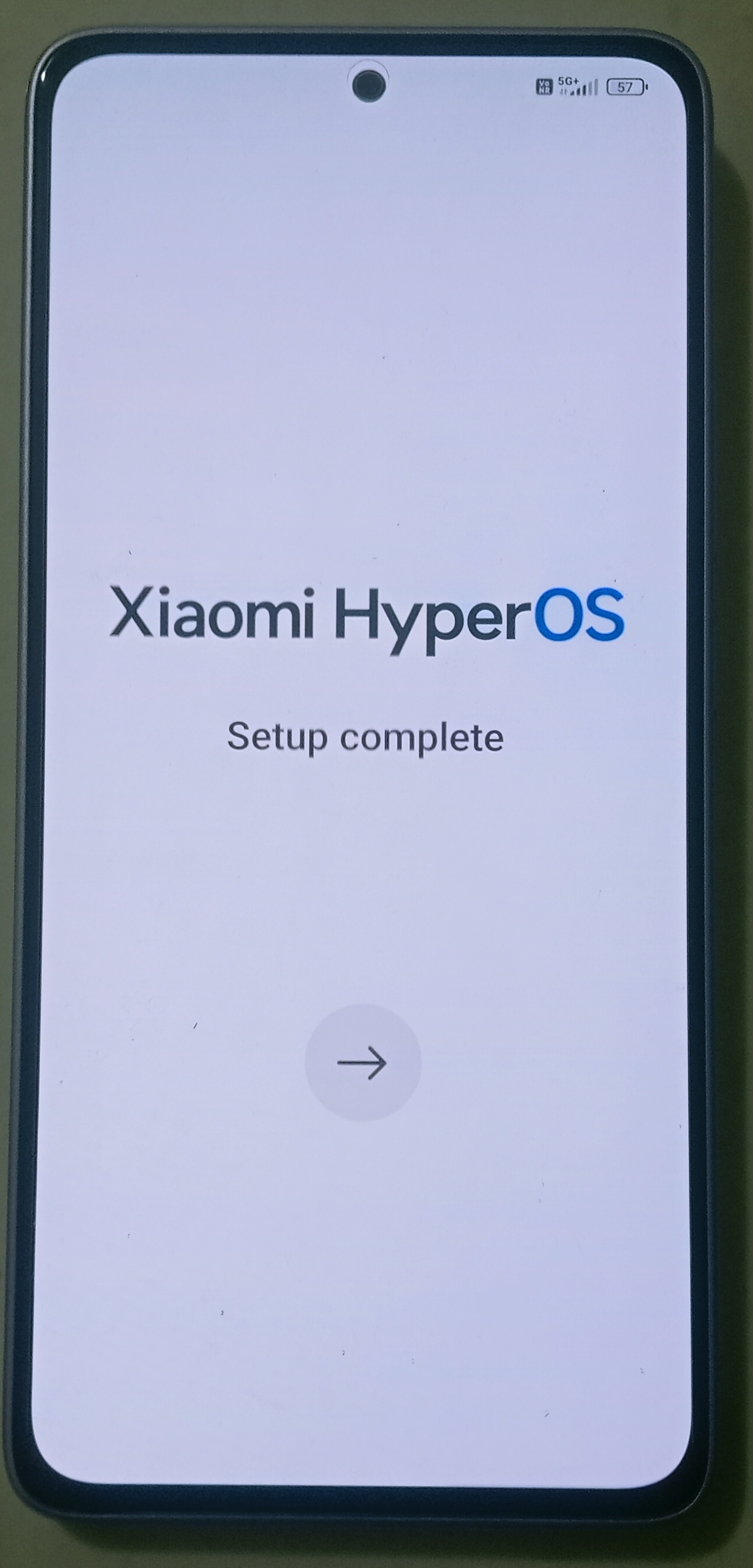
- Front view of Poco M7 Pro 5G
- Brand: POCO
- Developer: Xiaomi Inc.
- Manufacturer: XIAOMI
- Type: Smartphone
- Series: Poco M-Series
- Predecessor: Poco M6 Pro 5G
- Related: Redmi Note 14 5G; Poco M7; Poco M7 5G
- Compatible networks: GSM / HSPA / LTE / 5G (NR)
- Form factor: Slate
- Colors: Green, Silver
- Dimensions: 162.4 millimetres (6.39 in) H 75.7 millimetres (2.98 in) W 8 millimetres (0.31 in) D
- Weight: 190 g (6.7 oz)
- Operating system: Original: Xiaomi HyperOS 1 based on Android 14; 2 update: Xiaomi HyperOS 2 based on Android 15; Current: Xiaomi HyperOS 3 based on Android 16
- System-on-chip: MediaTek Dimensity 7025 Ultra
- Memory: 8/12 GB
- Storage: 256/512 GB UFS 2.0
- Removable storage: Yes
- SIM: Dual nanoSIM slots
- Battery: 5110 mAh
- Charging: 45 W
- Rear camera: 50 MP f/1.5 Optical Image Stabilization
- Front camera: 20 MP
- Display: 6.67-inch AMOLED 120 Hz
- Water resistance: IP64

Poco M7 Pro 5G is an Android smartphone developed by the Chinese manufacturer Xiaomi sub-brand Poco, and it was announced on 17 December 2024 and released on 20 December 2024. Xiaomi introduced the device to European markets in April 2025, following global launch of the POCO F7 Pro and POCO F7 Ultra. This expansion came after its mid-December debut in India, where it gained significant attention for its strong value proposition.

== Specifications ==
=== Hardware ===
The Poco M7 Pro 5G uses the MediaTek Dimensity 7025 Ultra chipset, built on a 6 nm process. The phone is powered by a 5110 mAh battery that supports 45 W wired charging. It measures 162.4 x 75.7 x 8 mm and weighs 190 grams. The device features a 6.67-inch AMOLED display with a 120 Hz refresh rate, Dolby Vision, and HDR10+ support, capable of achieving up to 2100 nits peak brightness.

=== Camera ===
The Poco M7 Pro 5G comes with a dual rear camera setup:

- 50 MP wide camera that use sony LYT-600(Rebrand of imx882) sensor with f/1.5 aperture, PDAF, OIS, and a 1/1.95" sensor.
- 2 MP depth sensor with f/2.4 aperture.

The rear cameras support 1080p video recording at 30fps. On the front, there is a 20 MP selfie camera with an f/2.5 aperture, capable of recording 1080p video at 30fps. The selfie camera features HDR and panorama modes.

=== Software ===
It runs on Android 14 with HyperOS and is expected to receive up to 2 major Android upgrades (for INT models) or 4 major Android upgrades (for EU models).

=== Connectivity ===
- Network Technology - GSM / HSPA / LTE / 5G
- SIM - Dual Nano-SIM slots with support for IP64 water resistance (splash proof).
- Bluetooth - 5.3, A2DP, LE
- Wi-Fi - 802.11 a/b/g/n/ac, dual-band
- Positioning - GPS, GLONASS, Galileo, BDS
- USB - USB-C
- Radio - FM radio (market/region dependent)
- Infrared port - Yes
- NFC - Depends on region. China version - none; Global version - yes

=== Audio ===
- Stereo speakers with 24-bit/192kHz Hi-Res audio support.
- 3.5mm headphone jack is available for wired audio.

=== Battery ===
The Poco M7 Pro 5G is equipped with a 5110 mAh Li-Po battery and supports 45W wired charging for quick recharges.

== Critical reception ==
Haider Ali Khan of The Hindu praised the Poco M7 Pro 5G for its strong features at a low price. Key highlights include its 50 MP OIS camera, smooth AMOLED display with a 120 Hz refresh rate, and solid performance with the Dimensity 7025 Ultra processor. However, he notes that for those prioritizing performance in heavy gaming or durability, alternatives like the Moto G85 or Nothing CMF Phone 1 might be better choices.

Amit Rahi of Hindustan Times praised the POCO M7 Pro 5G for its exceptional value, with a sleek design and vibrant 6.67-inch AMOLED display featuring a 120Hz refresh rate. Rahi noted its strong performance from the MediaTek Dimensity 7025 Ultra chipset and admired the long-lasting 5110mAh battery with fast charging. The camera was highlighted for sharp daylight photos, although it struggled in low light. The robust 5G connectivity and additional features like an IR blaster were seen as significant advantages.
