= Poco M6 Pro =

LTE smartphone

Xiaomi Poco M6 Pro
- Brand: Poco
- Manufacturer: Xiaomi
- Type: Smartphone
- Series: Poco M series
- First released: January 12, 2024
- Availability by region: January 12, 2024: Philippines
- Predecessor: Poco M5 Pro
- Related: Redmi Note 13 Pro 4G
- Compatible networks: GSM, HSPA, LTE (4G)
- Form factor: Slate
- Colors: Black, Blue and Purple
- Dimensions: 161.1×75×8 mm (6.34×2.95×0.31 in)
- Weight: 179 g (6.3 oz)
- Operating system: Android 13 with MIUI 14 (upgradable to Android 14 with HyperOS)
- System-on-chip: MediaTek Helio G99 Ultra
- CPU: Octa-core (2x2.2 GHz Cortex-A76 & 6x2.0 GHz Cortex-A55)
- GPU: Mali-G57 MC2
- Memory: 8 GB or 12 GB LPDDR4X
- Storage: 256 GB or 512 GB UFS 2.2
- Removable storage: microSDXC (uses shared SIM slot)
- Battery: 5,000 mAh Li-Po (non-removable)
- Charging: 67W wired (100% in 44 min)
- Rear camera: Triple: • 64 MP, f/1.8, 25mm (wide), 1/2.0", 0.7µm, PDAF, OIS • 8 MP, f/2.2 (ultrawide) • 2 MP, f/2.4 (macro); Features: LED flash, HDR, panorama Video: 1080p@30/60fps, gyro-EIS
- Front camera: 16 MP, f/2.5 (wide); Video: 1080p@30/60fps
- Display: 6.67 in (169 mm) AMOLED, 120Hz, 1000 nits (HBM), 1300 nits (peak); 1080 × 2400 pixels, 20:9 ratio (~395 ppi density); Protection: (Gorilla Glass 5)
- Sound: Stereo speakers, 3.5mm jack, 24-bit/192kHz Hi-Res audio
- Connectivity: Wi-Fi 802.11 a/b/g/n/ac, dual-band Bluetooth 5.2, A2DP, LE; GPS, GALILEO, GLONASS, BDS; NFC (market dependent); Infrared port FM radio USB Type-C 2.0, OTG
- Data inputs: Fingerprint scanner (under display, optical), accelerometer, gyroscope, compass, virtual proximity sensing
- Water resistance: IP54 dust and splash resistant
- Model: 2312FPCA6G
- Development status: Announced on January 11, 2024; Available

The POCO M6 Pro (4G) is a budget Android smartphone manufactured and designed by Xiaomi under its sub-brand POCO. It was launched on January 12, 2024 in the Philippines, along with the X6 and X6 Pro.

== Specifications ==
=== Design & hardware ===
At the back (including the frame), the M6 Pro is made of plastic that weights about 182 grams. It has an IP rating of 54 for splash and dust resistance. It was available at Black, Blue and Purple color options.

The M6 Pro is powered by a Helio G99 Ultra chipset under its octa-core CPU composed of 2 Cortex-A76 cores clocking at 2.2 GHz and 6 Cortex-A55 cores clocking at 2.0 GHz. It was also powered by a Mali-G57 MC2 GPU. It has an internal storage of 256GB or 512GB with UFS 2.2 and memory capacity of 8GB or 12GB with LPDDR4X.

The M6 Pro was housed by a 5,000 mAh non-removable battery with fast charging support up to 67 watts.

In the front, the M6 pro has a AMOLED display with a 120Hz refresh rate, a resolution of 1080 × 2400 pixels, a 20:9 ratio, and a maximum brightness of 1300 nits. It also support 1920Hz PWM dimming at low brightness levels.

=== Camera ===
The M6 Pro consists of 3 rear cameras - a 50MP main camera with optical impage stabilization (OIS) (including electronic image stabilization (EIS)), an aperture of f/1.8 and a sensor size of one and a half inches, an 8MP ultra-wide camera with viewing angle up to 118 degrees, and a 2MP macro camera. In the front, the M6 Pro has a 16MP camera with an aperture of f/2.5.

=== Software ===
The M6 Pro runs on MIUI 14 running on Android 13 with the HyperOS interface. It was updated to HyperOS 3.
