= Redmi Note 13 =

Android smartphone developed by Xiaomi

Redmi Note 13 Redmi Note 13 5G (marketed as POCO X6 Neo in India) Redmi Note 13 Pro Redmi Note 13 Pro 5G Redmi Note 13 Pro+ Redmi Note 13R Pro POCO M6 Pro POCO X6
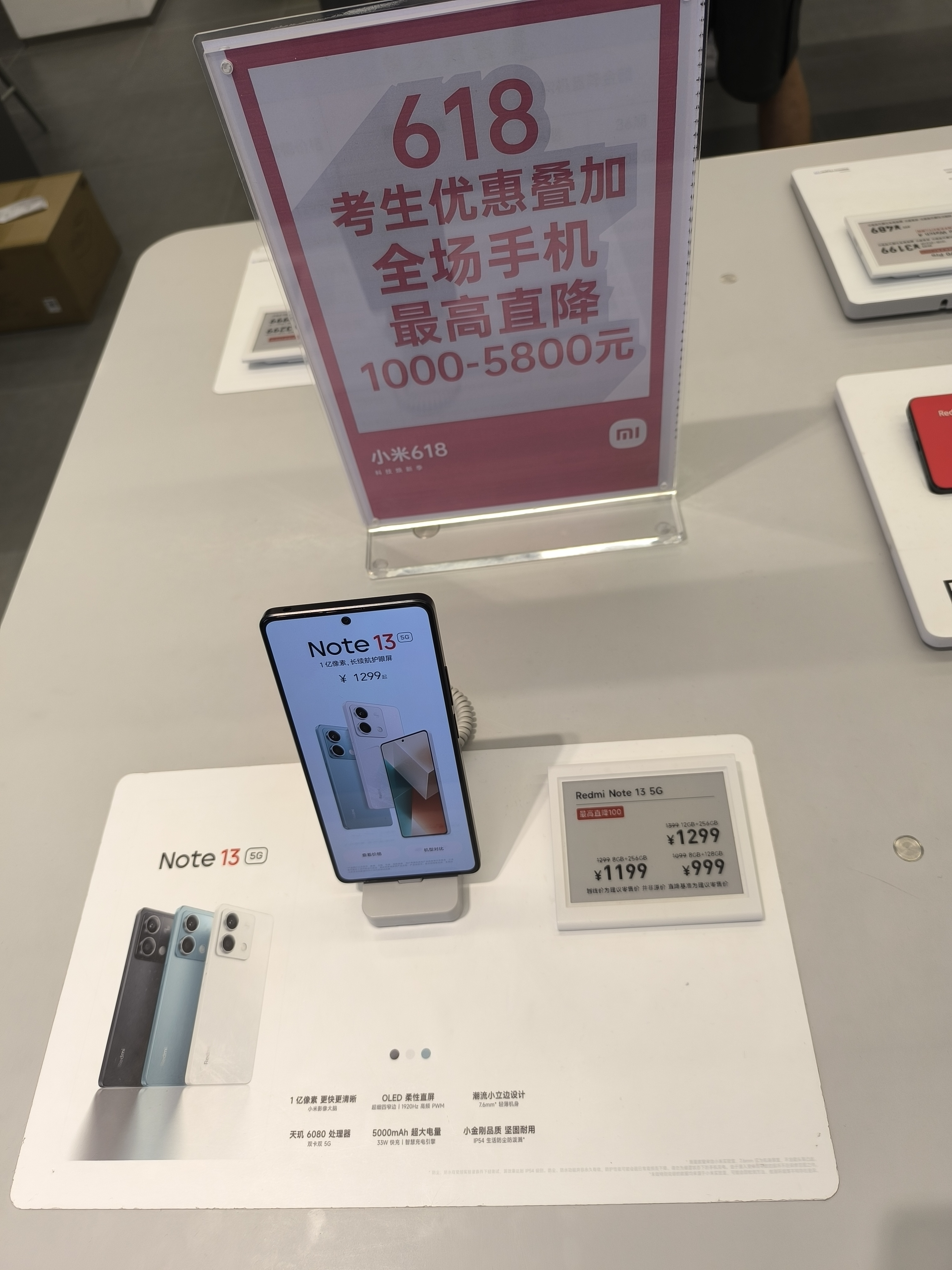
- Redmi Note 13 5G in a Xiaomi Store in China
- Brand: Redmi, POCO
- Manufacturer: Xiaomi
- Type: Smartphone
- Series: Redmi Note; POCO M series POCO X series
- First released: Redmi Note 13 5G (China) / Pro 5G / Pro+: September 21, 2023; 2 years ago; Redmi Note 13R Pro: November 20, 2023; 2 years ago; Redmi Note 13 5G (Global): January 4, 2024; 2 years ago; POCO M6 Pro / X6: January 11, 2024; 2 years ago; Redmi Note 13 / Pro: January 15, 2024; 2 years ago; POCO X6 Neo: March 13, 2024; 2 years ago
- Predecessor: Redmi Note 12; POCO X5 5G; POCO M4 Pro
- Successor: Redmi Note 14; POCO M7 Pro; POCO X7
- Related: Redmi Note 13R; POCO M6; POCO M6 5G; POCO M6 Pro 5G; POCO X6 Pro; Redmi Turbo 3
- Compatible networks: Redmi Note 13 / Pro / POCO M6 Pro: GSM / CDMA / HSPA / EVDO / LTE; Redmi Note 13 5G / Pro 5G / Pro+ / 13R Pro / POCO X6 / X6 Neo: GSM / CDMA / HSPA / EVDO / LTE / 5G
- Form factor: Slate
- Dimensions: Redmi Note 13: 162.3 mm (6.39 in) H 75.6 mm (2.98 in) W 8.0 mm (0.31 in) D; Redmi Note 13 5G (Global / China): 161.1 mm (6.34 in) H 75.0 mm (2.95 in) W 7.6 mm (0.30 in) D; Redmi Note 13 Pro / POCO M6 Pro: 161.1 mm (6.34 in) H 75.0 mm (2.95 in) W 8.0 mm (0.31 in) D; Redmi Note 13 Pro 5G: 161.2 mm (6.35 in) H 74.2 mm (2.92 in) W 8.0 mm (0.31 in) D; Redmi Note 13 Pro+: 161.4 mm (6.35 in) H 74.2 mm (2.92 in) W 8.9 mm (0.35 in) D; Redmi Note 13R Pro / POCO X6 Neo: 161.1 mm (6.34 in) H 75.0 mm (2.95 in) W 7.7 mm (0.30 in) D; POCO X6: 161.2 mm (6.35 in) H 74.3 mm (2.93 in) W 8.0 mm (0.31 in) D
- Weight: Redmi Note 13: 188.5 g (6.65 oz); Redmi Note 13 5G (Global): 174.5 g (6.16 oz); Redmi Note 13 5G (China): 173.5 g (6.12 oz); Redmi Note 13 Pro: 188 g (6.6 oz); Redmi Note 13 Pro 5G: 187 g (6.6 oz); Redmi Note 13 Pro+: 199 g (7.0 oz) or 204.5 g (7.21 oz); Redmi Note 13R Pro / POCO X6 Neo: 175 g (6.2 oz); POCO M6 Pro: 179 g (6.3 oz); POCO X6: 181 g (6.4 oz)
- Operating system: Initial: Android 13 + MIUI 14 (POCO models with MIUI for POCO); Current: Android 15 + Xiaomi HyperOS 2.2
- System-on-chip: Redmi Note 13: Qualcomm Snapdragon 685 (6 nm); Redmi Note 13 5G / 13R Pro / POCO X6 Neo: MediaTek Dimensity 6080 (6 nm); Redmi Note 13 Pro / POCO M6 Pro: MediaTek Helio G99 Ultra (6 nm); Redmi Note 13 Pro 5G / POCO X6: Qualcomm Snapdragon 7s Gen 2 (4 nm); Redmi Note 13 Pro+: MediaTek Dimensity 7200 Ultra (4 nm)
- CPU: Redmi Note 13: Octa-core (4x2.8 GHz Cortex-A73 & 4x1.9 GHz Cortex-A53); Redmi Note 13 5G / 13R Pro / POCO X6 Neo: Octa-core (2x2.4 GHz Cortex-A76 & 6x2.0 GHz Cortex-A55); Redmi Note 13 Pro / POCO M6 Pro: Octa-core (2x2.2 GHz Cortex-A76 & 6x2.0 GHz Cortex-A55); Redmi Note 13 Pro 5G / POCO X6: Octa-core (4x2.40 GHz Cortex-A78 & 4x1.95 GHz Cortex-A55); Redmi Note 13 Pro+: Octa-core (2x2.8 GHz Cortex-A715 & 6x2.0 GHz Cortex-A510)
- GPU: Redmi Note 13: Adreno 610; Redmi Note 13 5G / 13R Pro / 13 Pro / POCO M6 Pro / POCO X6 Neo: Mali-G57 MC2; Redmi Note 13 Pro 5G / POCO X6: Adreno 710; Redmi Note 13 Pro+: Mali-G610 MC4
- Memory: Redmi Note 13: 6/8 GB RAM (LPDDR4X); Redmi Note 13 5G (Global / China): 6/8/12 GB RAM (LPDDR4X); Redmi Note 13 Pro / POCO X6 Neo / M6 Pro / X6: 8/12 GB RAM (LPDDR4X); Redmi Note 13 Pro 5G: 8/12/16 GB RAM (LPDDR4X); Redmi Note 13 Pro+: 8/12/16 GB RAM (LPDDR5); Redmi Note 13R Pro: 12GB RAM (LPDDR4X)
- Storage: Redmi Note 13 / 13 5G (Global) / 13 Pro / 13 Pro 5G: 128/256/512 GB (UFS 2.2); Redmi Note 13 5G (China) / POCO X6 Neo: 128/256 GB (UFS 2.2); Redmi Note 13 Pro+: 256/512 GB (UFS 3.1); Redmi Note 13R Pro: 256 GB (UFS 2.2); POCO M6 Pro / X6: 256/512 GB (UFS 2.2)
- Removable storage: Redmi Note 13 / 13 5G (Global) / 13 Pro / POCO X6 Neo / M6 Pro: microSDXC (uses shared SIM slot), expandable up to 1TB; Redmi Note 13 5G (China) / 13 Pro 5G / 13 Pro+ / 13R Pro / POCO X6: N/A
- SIM: Redmi Note 13 / 13 5G (Global / China) / 13 Pro / 13R Pro / POCO M6 Pro / X6 / X6 Neo: Dual nano-SIM; Redmi Note 13 Pro 5G / 13 Pro+: nano-SIM + eSIM, Dual nano-SIM
- Battery: Redmi Note 13 / 13 5G (Global / China) / 13 Pro / 13 Pro+ / 13R Pro / POCO M6 Pro / X6 Neo: 5000 mAh lithium-polymer; Redmi Note 13 Pro 5G / POCO X6: 5100 mAh lithium-polymer
- Charging: Redmi Note 13 / 13 5G (Global) / 13 5G (China) / 13R Pro / POCO X6 Neo: 33W Mi Turbo Charging; Redmi Note 13 Pro / 13 Pro 5G / POCO M6 Pro / X6: 67W Mi Turbo Charging, Power Delivery 3.0; Redmi Note 13 Pro+: 120W Xiaomi HyperCharge, Power Delivery 3.0
- Rear camera: Triple-Camera Setup; Redmi Note 13: Primary: Samsung ISOCELL (S5K)HM6; 108 MP, f/1.75, 24mm (wide), 1/1.67", 0.64 µm, PDAF; Ultrawide: Samsung ISOCELL (S5K)4H7; 8 MP, f/2.2, 15mm, FoV 120°, 1/4.0", 1.12 µm, FF; Macro: SmartSens SC202CS; 2 MP, f/2.4, 24mm, 1/5.1", 1.75 µm, FF; Redmi Note 13 5G (Global): Primary: Samsung ISOCELL (S5K)HM6; 108 MP, f/1.75, 24mm (wide), 1/1.67", 0.64 µm, PDAF; Ultrawide: OmniVision OV08D10; 8 MP, f/2.2, 16mm, FoV 120°, 1/4.4", 1.0 µm, FF; Depth: SmartSens SC202CS; 2 MP, f/2.4, 1/5.1", 1.75 µm; Redmi Note 13 Pro / 13 Pro 5G / 13 Pro+: Primary: Samsung ISOCELL (S5K)HP3; 200 MP, f/1.65, 23mm (wide), 1/1.4", 0.56 µm, Super QPD (multi-directional PDAF), OIS; Ultrawide: OmniVision OV08D10 (Note 13 Pro), Sony IMX 355 (Note 13 Pro 5G), Sony IMX 336 (Note 13 Pro+); 8 MP, f/2.2, 15mm (Note 13 Pro), 16mm (Note 13 Pro 5G/13 Pro+), FoV 118° (Note 13 Pro 5G), 120° (Note 13 Pro/13 Pro+), 1/4.0" (Note 13 Pro 5G/13 Pro+), 1/4.4" (Note 13 Pro), 1.12 µm (Note 13 Pro 5G/13 Pro+), 1.0 µm (Note 13 Pro), FF; Macro: SmartSens SC202CS (Note 13 Pro), OmniVision OV02B (Note 13 Pro 5G/13 Pro+); 2 MP, f/2.4, 24mm (Note 13 Pro), 25mm (Note 13 Pro 5G/13 Pro+), 1/5.0" (Note 13 Pro 5G/13 Pro+), 1/5.1" (Note 13 Pro), 1.75 µm, FF; Dual-Camera Setup; Redmi Note 13R Pro / 13 5G (China) / POCO X6 Neo: Primary: Samsung ISOCELL (S5K)HM6; 108 MP, f/1.8, 24mm (wide), 1/1.67", 0.64 µm, PDAF; Depth: SmartSens SC202CS; 2 MP, f/2.4, 1/5.1", 1.75 µm; Triple-Camera Setup; POCO M6 Pro / X6: Primary: OmniVision PureCel®Plus‑S OV64B; 64 MP, f/1.8, 25mm (wide), 1/2.0", 0.7 µm, PDAF, OIS; Ultrawide: OmniVision OV08D (M6 Pro), Sony IMX 355 (X6); 8 MP, f/2.2, 16mm, FoV 118° (X6), 120° (M6 Pro), 1/4.0", 1.12 µm, FF; Macro: OmniVision OV02B; 2 MP, f/2.4, 24mm (M6 Pro), 25mm (X6), 1/5.0", 1.75 µm, FF; Camera features: Redmi Note 13 / 13 5G (Global / China) / 13 Pro / 13R Pro / POCO M6 Pro / X6 / X6 Neo: LED flash, HDR, panorama; Redmi Note 13 Pro 5G / 13 Pro+: Dual-LED dual-tone flash, HDR, panorama; Video recording: Redmi Note 13 / 13 5G / 13R Pro / POCO X6 Neo: 1080p@30fps; Redmi Note 13 Pro / POCO M6 Pro: 1080p@30/60fps, gyro-EIS; Redmi Note 13 Pro 5G: 4K@30fps, 1080p@30/60/120fps, gyro-EIS; Redmi Note 13 Pro+: 4K@24/30fps, 1080p@30/60/120fps, gyro-EIS; POCO X6: 4K@30fps, 1080p@30/60fps, gyro-EIS
- Front camera: GalaxyCore GC16B3 or OmniVision OV16A1Q (Redmi Note 13 / 13 5G (Global / China)), OmniVision PureCel®Plus‑S OV16A (Redmi Note 13 Pro / 13 Pro 5G / POCO M6 Pro / X6 Neo), OmniVision OV16A1Q (Redmi Note 13 Pro+ / POCO X6); 16 MP, f/2.4 (Redmi Note 13 / 13 5G (Global / China) / 13 Pro / 13 Pro 5G / 13 Pro+ / 13R Pro / POCO M6 Pro / X6 Neo), f/2.45 (POCO X6), 24mm (wide), 1/3.06", 1.0 µm, FF; Camera features: Redmi Note 13 5G (Global / China) / 13 Pro 5G / 13 Pro+ / POCO X6: HDR, panorama; Redmi Note 13 / 13 Pro / 13R Pro / POCO M6 Pro / X6 Neo: HDR; Video recording: Redmi Note 13 / 13 5G (Global / China) / 13 Pro / 13R Pro / POCO X6 Neo: 1080p@30fps; Redmi Note 13 Pro 5G / 13 Pro+ / POCO M6 Pro / X6: 1080p@30/60fps
- Display: 6.67 in AMOLED, 120 Hz, 20:9 aspect ratio (resolution varies by model)
- Water resistance: IP54 (most models); IP68 (Redmi Note 13 Pro+)
- Model: Redmi Note 13: 23129RAA4G, 23124RA7EO (NFC), 23129RA5FL; Redmi Note 13 5G (Global): 2312DRAABG, 2312DRAABI; Redmi Note 13 5G (China): 2312DRAABC; Redmi Note 13 Pro: 23117RA68G, 2312FPCA6G; Redmi Note 13 Pro 5G: 2312DRA50C, 2312CRAD3C, 2312DRA50G, 2312DRA50I; Redmi Note 13 Pro+: 23090RA98C, 23090RA98G, 23090RA98I; Redmi Note 13R Pro: 2311FRAFDC; POCO M6 Pro: 2312FPCA6G; POCO X6: 23122PCD1G, 23122PCD1I; POCO X6 Neo: MZB0GGWIN, 2312FRAFDI
- Codename: Redmi Note 13: sapphire, sapphiren (NFC); Redmi Note 13 5G (Global) / 13 5G (China) / 13R Pro / POCO X6 Neo: gold; Redmi Note 13 Pro / POCO M6 Pro: emerald; Redmi Note 13 Pro 5G / POCO X6: garnet; Redmi Note 13 Pro+: zircon
- SAR: Redmi Note 13: 0.98 W/kg (head) 0.49 W/kg (body) SAR EU 0.77 W/kg (head) 0.98 W/kg (body); Redmi Note 13 5G: 1.07 W/kg (head) 0.99 W/kg (body) SAR EU 0.94 W/kg (head) 1.00 W/kg (body); Redmi Note 13 Pro / POCO M6 Pro: 1.09 W/kg (head) 1.09 W/kg (body) SAR EU 0.99 W/kg (head) 0.99 W/kg (body); Redmi Note 13 Pro 5G / POCO X6: 1.09 W/kg (head) 1.03 W/kg (body) SAR EU 1.00 W/kg (head) 1.00 W/kg (body); Redmi Note 13 Pro+: 1.09 W/kg (head) 0.85 W/kg (body) SAR EU 0.98 W/kg (head) 1.00 W/kg (body); Redmi Note 13R Pro / POCO X6 Neo: 0.85 W/kg (head) 0.71 W/kg (body)
- Website: Redmi Note 13: https://www.mi.com/global/product/redmi-note-13/; Redmi Note 13 5G: https://www.mi.com/global/product/redmi-note-13-5g/; Redmi Note 13 Pro: https://www.mi.com/global/product/redmi-note-13-pro/; Redmi Note 13 Pro 5G: https://www.mi.com/global/product/redmi-note-13-pro-5g/; Redmi Note 13 Pro+: https://www.mi.com/global/product/redmi-note-13-pro-plus-5g/; POCO M6 Pro: https://www.po.co/global/product/poco-m6-pro/; POCO X6: https://www.po.co/global/product/poco-x6/

The Redmi Note 13 is a line of Android-based smartphones developed by Xiaomi under its sub-brand Redmi, forming part of the Redmi Note series. The global lineup consists of the Redmi Note 13, Note 13 5G, Note 13 Pro, Note 13 Pro 5G, and Note 13 Pro+.

In China, additional models include the Redmi Note 13R Pro, which differs from the Chinese Note 13 5G primarily in camera module design, and the Redmi Note 13R.

The global version of the Redmi Note 13 5G differs from the Chinese variant by offering a more advanced camera setup and support for expandable storage.

On 11 January 2024, POCO introduced the POCO M6 Pro (not to be confused with the POCO M6 Pro 5G) and the POCO X6 alongside the POCO X6 Pro. The POCO M6 Pro is essentially a Redmi Note 13 Pro featuring a 64 MP main wide camera, while the POCO X6 is a Redmi Note 13 Pro 5G with a 64 MP main camera and a plastic back panel.

On 13 March 2024, the POCO X6 Neo was launched in India as a local version of the Redmi Note 13R Pro with support for memory cards.

== Design ==
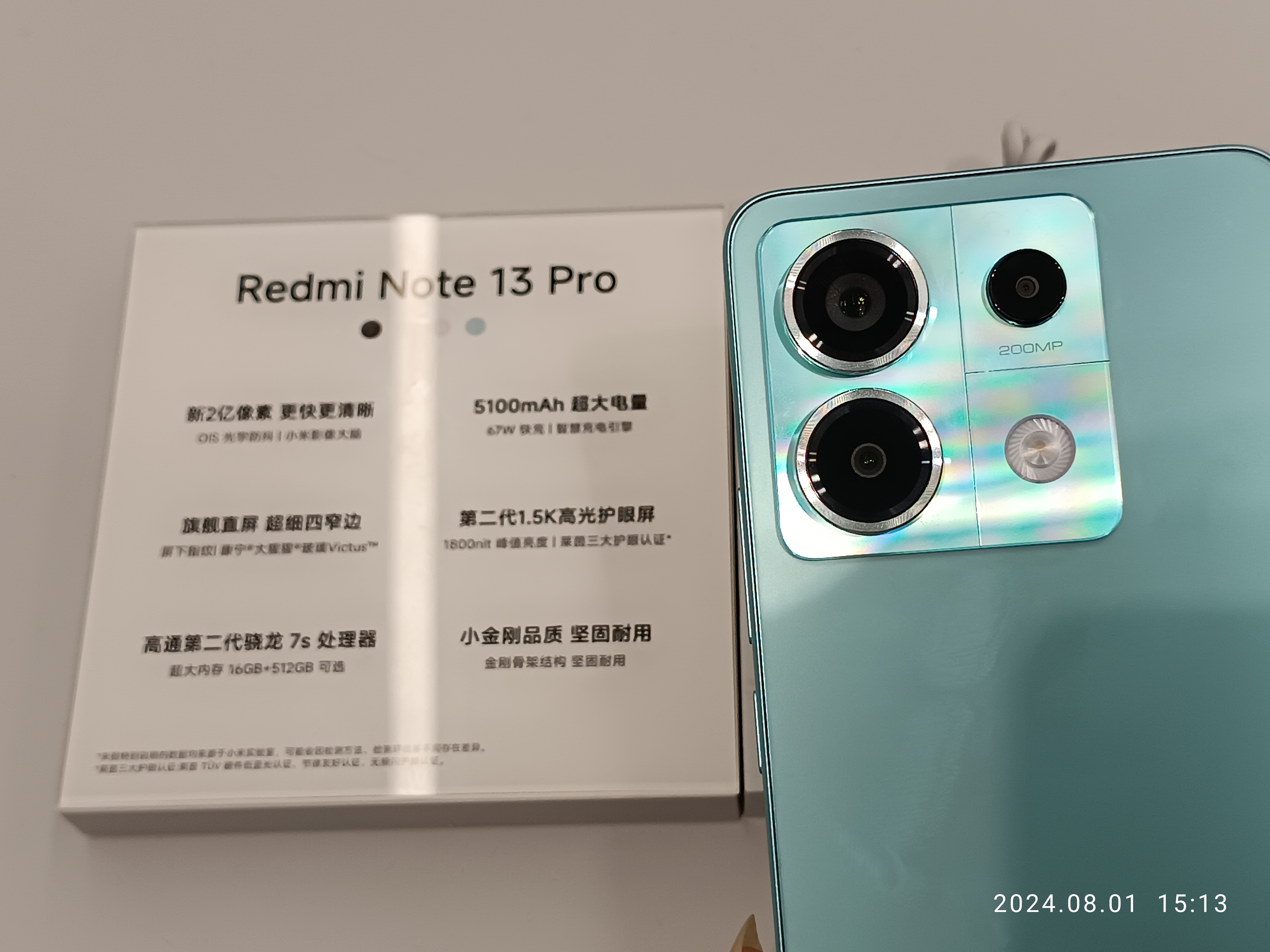
Redmi Note 13 Pro 5G in the Time Blue color

The front panel of the Redmi Note 13 is protected by Corning Gorilla Glass 3, while the Redmi Note 13 5G, Note 13 Pro, Note 13R Pro, POCO M6 Pro and POCO X6 Neo use Gorilla Glass 5. The Note 13 Pro 5G, Note 13 Pro+ and POCO X6 feature Gorilla Glass Victus.

The rear panel of the Redmi Note 13, Note 13 5G, Redmi Note 13 Pro, Note 13R Pro and the POCO models is made of plastic, while the Redmi Note 13 Pro 5G and Note 13 Pro+ have a glass back. The Redmi Note 13 Pro+ also has an eco-leather color variant available in India and China.

On the Redmi Note 13 Pro+, both the front and rear panels are curved on the sides, while on the other models they are flat. The frame on all models is made of plastic. The Redmi Note 13 Pro+ is also water- and dust-resistant with an IP68 rating, while the other models are rated IP54.

Below is a table showing the layout of elements on the models. The order is described from left to right for the top and bottom sides, and from top to bottom for the right side:

	Model				
Frame side	Redmi Note 13	Redmi Note 13 5G Redmi Note 13R Pro / POCO X6 Neo	Redmi Note 13 Pro POCO M6 Pro	Redmi Note 13 Pro 5G POCO X6	Redmi Note 13 Pro+
Bottom	Hybrid slot (Nano-SIM + Nano-SIM or Nano-SIM + microSD), USB-C, microphone, speaker	Microphone, USB-C, speaker		Nano-SIM + Nano-SIM slot, microphone, USB-C, speaker	
Top	3.5 mm audio jack, speaker, infrared port, microphone	3.5 mm audio jack, infrared port, microphone	3.5 mm audio jack, speaker, infrared port, microphone	3.5 mm audio jack, speaker, microphone, infrared port	Microphone, speaker, microphone, infrared port
Left	None	Hybrid slot (Nano-SIM + Nano-SIM or Nano-SIM + microSD)		None	
Right	Volume buttons, power button	Volume buttons, power button (with fingerprint scanner)	Volume buttons, power button		

Redmi Note 13 is sold in four colors: Midnight Black (black), Mint Green (green), Ice Blue (blue) and Ocean Sunset (gold).

Redmi Note 13 5G on the global market is available in three colors: Graphite Black (black), Arctic White (white) and Ocean Teal (blue). In China, it is sold in the same colors under the names Midnight Black, Star Sand White and Time Blue respectively. In India, the Redmi Note 13 5G is available in four colors: Stealth Black (black), Arctic White (white), Prism Gold (gold) and Chromatic Purple (purple).

Redmi Note 13 Pro is sold in three colors: Midnight Black (black), Forest Green (green) and Lavender Purple (purple).

Redmi Note 13 Pro 5G on the global market is available in four colors: Midnight Black (black), Ocean Teal (blue), Aurora Purple (purple rear panel with a blue-pink-green camera island) and Olive Green (olive). In China, it is available in the following four colors: Midnight Black (black), Star Sand White (white), Time Blue (blue) and Light Dream Space (purple rear panel with a blue-pink-green camera island). In India, the Redmi Note 13 Pro 5G is available in four colors: Midnight Black (black), Arctic White (white), Coral Purple (purple rear panel with a blue-pink-green camera island) and Scarlet Red (red rear panel with a black frame and camera island).

On the global market, Redmi Note 13 Pro+ is sold in three colors: Midnight Black (black), Moonlight White (white) and Aurora Purple (mostly purple with a blue-cyan-green upper section of the rear panel). During Xiaomi Fan Festival 2024, the Redmi Note 13 Pro+ was also available in a Mystic Silver color (silver with the Xiaomi Fan Festival logo). In China, the smartphone is available in the following three colors: Midnight Black (black), Mirror White (white) and Light Dream Space (mostly purple with a blue-white-green upper section; eco-leather back). In India, the Redmi Note 13 Pro+ is available in the same colors as in China but under different names: Fusion Black, Fusion White and Fusion Purple respectively.

POCO M6 Pro is sold in three colors: black, blue and purple.

On the global market, POCO X6 is available in three colors: black, white and blue. In India, the smartphone is available in Mirror Black (black) and Snowstorm White (white).

Redmi Note 13R Pro is sold in three colors: Midnight Black (black), Time Blue (blue) and Morning Light Gold (gold). POCO X6 Neo is available in the same colors under different names: Astral Black, Horizon Blue and Martian Orange respectively.

== Specifications ==
=== Hardware ===
==== Platform ====
Redmi Note 13, like its predecessor, is powered by a Snapdragon 685 processor with an Adreno 610 GPU. Meanwhile, Redmi Note 13 5G, Redmi Note 13R Pro and POCO X6 Neo feature the MediaTek Dimensity 6080 processor with a Mali-G57 MC2 GPU.

Redmi Note 13 Pro and POCO M6 Pro use the MediaTek Helio G99 Ultra processor with a Mali-G57 MC2 GPU, the main difference from the regular Helio G99 being support for cameras up to 200 MP. Redmi Note 13 Pro 5G and POCO X6 use the Qualcomm Snapdragon 7s Gen 2 with an Adreno 710 GPU, while Redmi Note 13 Pro+ features the MediaTek Dimensity 7200 Ultra with a Mali-G610 MC4 GPU.

==== Battery ====
Redmi Note 13 Pro 5G and POCO X6 are equipped with a 5100 mAh battery, while all other models have a 5000 mAh battery.

Redmi Note 13, Note 13 5G and Note 13R Pro/POCO X6 Neo support 33 W fast charging, Note 13 Pro, Note 13 Pro 5G and POCO X6 support 67 W, and Note 13 Pro+ supports 120 W.

==== Camera ====
The Chinese versions of Redmi Note 13 5G, Note 13R Pro and POCO X6 Neo feature a dual rear camera setup, while all other models have a triple rear camera system.

Redmi Note 13 and Note 13 5G feature a 108 MP wide-angle lens with an aperture of f/1.75 and phase-detection autofocus, an 8 MP ultrawide lens with an aperture of f/2.2, and a 2 MP macro lens with an aperture of f/2.4. In the Chinese version of Redmi Note 13 5G, Note 13R Pro and POCO X6 Neo, the ultrawide and macro lenses are replaced by a 2 MP depth sensor with an aperture of f/2.4.

Redmi Note 13 Pro, Note 13 Pro 5G and Note 13 Pro+ feature a 200 MP Samsung ISOCELL HP3 wide-angle camera with an aperture of f/1.65, multi-directional phase-detection autofocus and optical image stabilization, an 8 MP ultrawide lens with an aperture of f/2.2 and a 120° field of view in Redmi Note 13 Pro and Note 13 Pro+, and 118° in Redmi Note 13 Pro 5G, as well as a 2 MP macro lens with an aperture of f/2.4.

POCO M6 Pro and POCO X6 feature a 64 MP wide-angle camera with an aperture of f/1.8, phase-detection autofocus and optical image stabilization, an 8 MP ultrawide lens with an aperture of f/2.2 and a 120° field of view in POCO M6 Pro and 118° in POCO X6, and a 2 MP macro lens with an aperture of f/2.4.

The main camera on Redmi Note 13, Note 13 5G, Note 13R Pro and POCO X6 Neo records video at 1080p@30fps, Redmi Note 13 Pro and POCO M6 Pro at 1080p@60fps, and Redmi Note 13 Pro 5G, Note 13 Pro+ and POCO X6 at 4K@30fps.

All models feature a 16 MP front camera with an aperture of f/2.4 on Redmi models and POCO X6 Neo, and f/2.5 on POCO M6 Pro and POCO X6. The front camera on Redmi Note 13, Note 13 5G, Note 13R Pro and POCO X6 Neo records video at 1080p@30fps, while the other models support 1080p@60fps.

==== Display ====
All models feature a 6.67-inch AMOLED display with a 20:9 aspect ratio, a 120 Hz refresh rate, and a centered punch-hole cutout for the front camera. The display on Redmi Note 13, Note 13 5G, Note 13 Pro, Note 13R Pro, POCO M6 Pro and POCO X6 Neo has a Full HD+ resolution (2400 × 1080) with a pixel density of 395 ppi, while Redmi Note 13 Pro 5G, Note 13 Pro+ and POCO X6 feature a so-called 1.5K resolution (2712 × 1220) with a pixel density of 446 ppi. Redmi Note 13 Pro 5G, Note 13 Pro+ and POCO X6 also support Dolby Vision and HDR10+. Additionally, all models except Redmi Note 13 5G, Note 13R Pro and POCO X6 Neo feature an under-display fingerprint scanner.

==== Sound ====
Redmi Note 13 5G, Note 13R Pro and POCO X6 Neo have a single bottom-firing loudspeaker, while the other models include an additional top speaker forming a stereo pair.

==== Memory ====
Redmi Note 13 is available in 6/128, 8/128 and 8/256 GB configurations; Note 13 5G in 6/128, 8/256, 12/256 and 12/512 GB; Note 13 Pro in 8/128, 8/256, 8/512 and 12/512 GB; Note 13 Pro 5G in 8/128, 8/256, 12/256, 12/512 and 16/512 GB; Note 13 Pro+ in 8/256, 12/256, 8/512, 12/512 and 16/512 GB; Note 13R Pro in 12/256 GB; POCO M6 Pro in 8/256 and 12/512 GB; POCO X6 in 8/256, 12/256 and 12/512 GB; and POCO X6 Neo in 8/128 and 12/256 GB.

Redmi Note 13 Pro+ uses LPDDR5 RAM and UFS 3.1 storage, while all other models use LPDDR4X RAM and UFS 2.2 storage. In addition, Redmi Note 13, the global Note 13 5G, Note 13 Pro, POCO M6 Pro and POCO X6 Neo support expandable storage via microSD cards up to 1 TB.

=== Software ===
Redmi Note 13, Note 13 5G, Note 13 Pro, Note 13 Pro 5G and Note 13 Pro+ were released with MIUI 14, while POCO M6 Pro, X6 and X6 Neo launched with MIUI 14 for POCO. Both interfaces are based on Android 13. All models were later updated to Xiaomi HyperOS 2 based on Android 15.

	Pre-installed OS	OS Upgrades history		
	Pre-installed OS	1st	2nd	3rd
Note 13 4G	Android 13 (MIUI 14)	Android 14 (HyperOS 1); March 2024	Android 15 (HyperOS 2); November 2024	—N/a
Note 13 5G	Android 13 (MIUI 14)	Android 14 (HyperOS 1); March 2024	Android 15 (HyperOS 2); November 2024	Android 16 (HyperOS 3); March 2026
Note 13 Pro 4G; POCO M6 Pro	Android 13 (MIUI 14)	Android 14 (HyperOS 1); March 2024	Android 15 (HyperOS 2); November 2024	Android 16 (HyperOS 3); March 2026
Note 13 Pro 5G; POCO X6	Android 13 (MIUI 14)	Android 14 (HyperOS 1); March 2024	Android 15 (HyperOS 2); November 2024	Android 16 (HyperOS 3); March 2026
Note 13 Pro+ 5G	Android 13 (MIUI 14)	Android 14 (HyperOS 1); March 2024	Android 15 (HyperOS 2); November 2024	Android 16 (HyperOS 3); March 2026

== Special editions ==
=== Redmi Note 13 Pro 2024 New Year Special Edition ===
Redmi Note 13 Pro 2024 New Year Special Edition is a special edition of the Redmi Note 13 Pro 5G dedicated to the Chinese New Year. The distinctive features of this edition are its color scheme, with a red rear panel and a black frame and camera island, as well as a specially designed retail box. This edition was available in mainland China in the same configurations as the standard model. In India, this edition became available in June 2024 as one of the color variants of the Redmi Note 13 Pro 5G under the name Scarlet Red.

=== Redmi Note 13 Pro+ Aape Trend Limited Edition ===
Redmi Note 13 Pro+ Aape Trend Limited Edition is a special edition of the Redmi Note 13 Pro+ developed in collaboration with Aape. Compared to the standard model, this edition features a camouflage-pattern rear panel with a glossy green upper section. It also includes a stylized retail box, case, charger, cable and a customized interface theme. This edition was officially sold only in mainland China in the 12/512 GB configuration.

=== Redmi Note 13 Pro+ World Champions Edition ===
Redmi Note 13 Pro+ World Champions Edition is a special version of the Redmi Note 13 Pro+ developed in collaboration with the Argentine Football Association and dedicated to the 10th anniversary of Xiaomi in the Indian market. The rear panel features a blue-and-white design inspired by the Argentina national football team that won the 2022 FIFA World Cup, with gold elements such as the number 10 symbolizing both 10 years on the Indian market and the jersey number of Lionel Messi, as well as the AFA and Redmi logos and gold accents around the camera modules. The package includes a stylized box, a SIM ejector tool, charger and cable. The smartphone also features a special interface theme. It is sold in the 12/512 GB configuration and is officially available only in India.

Preceded by Redmi Note 12/Pro	Redmi Note 13/Pro; 2024	Succeeded by Redmi Note 14/Pro
Preceded by Redmi Note 12 5G/Pro 5G/Pro+	Redmi Note 13 5G/Pro 5G/Pro+ 2023	Succeeded by Redmi Note 14 5G/Pro 5G/Pro+
Preceded by Redmi Note 12R Pro	Redmi Note 13R Pro; 2023	Succeeded by ---
Preceded by POCO M4 Pro	POCO M6 Pro; 2024	Succeeded by POCO M7 Pro
Preceded by POCO X5 5G	POCO X6; 2024	Succeeded by POCO X7
