= Redmi Note 12 =

2022/2023 Android smartphone made by Xiaomi

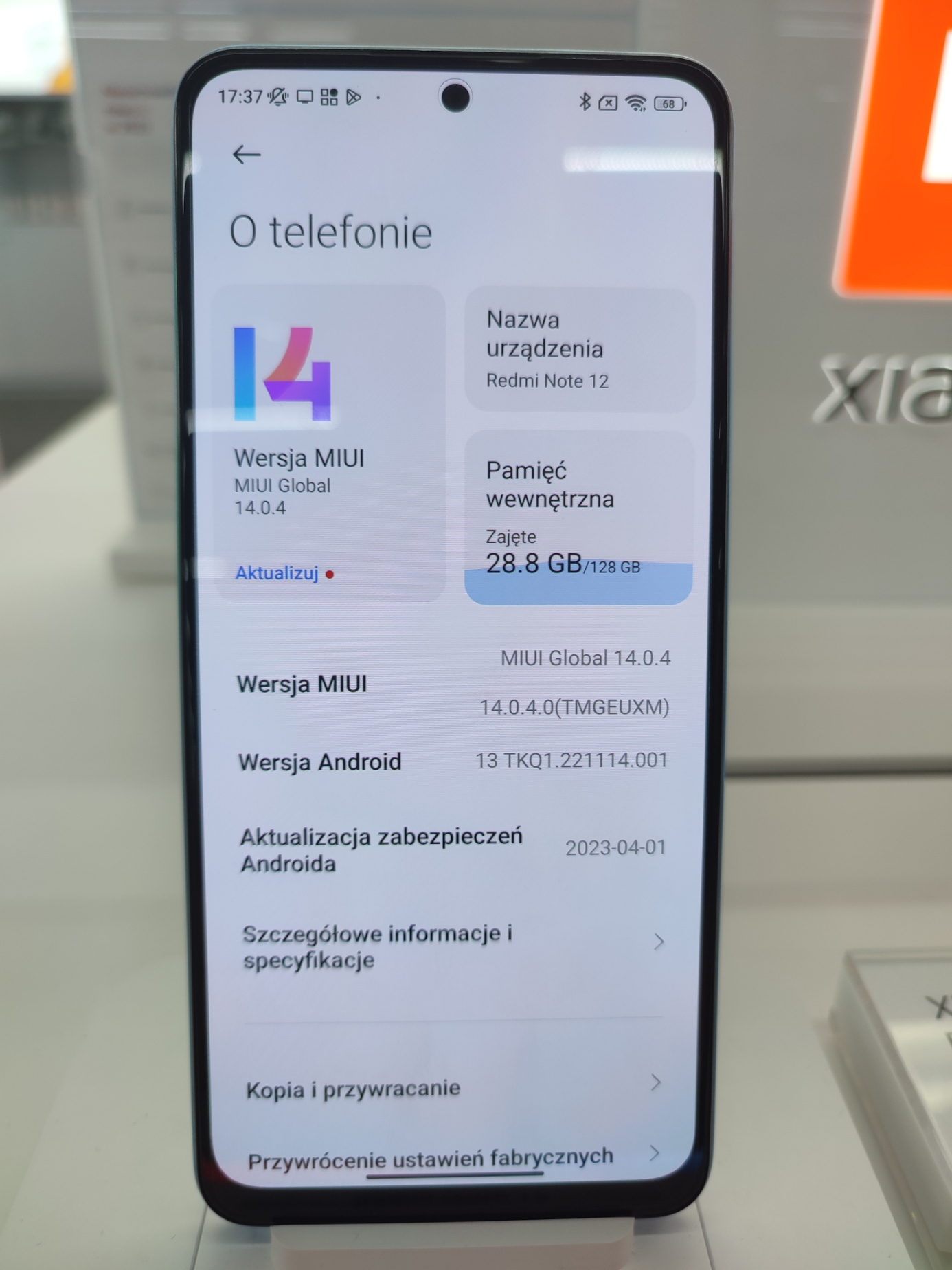
- The front of Redmi Note 12
- Brand: Redmi, Poco
- Manufacturer: Xiaomi
- Type: Phablet
- Series: Redmi Note, Poco X/F
- First released: Note 12 5G/Pro 5G/Pro+/Discovery: November 1, 2022; 3 years ago Note 12 Pro Speed: December 27, 2022; 3 years ago} Poco X5/Pro: February 6, 2023; 3 years ago Note 12 Pro 4G: March 3, 2023; 3 years ago Note 12S: March 6, 2023; 3 years ago Note 12: March 15, 2023; 3 years ago Note 12 Turbo: March 28, 2023; 3 years ago Note 12R Pro: April 29, 2023; 3 years ago Poco F5: May 9, 2023; 3 years ago Note 12T Pro: May 29, 2023; 3 years ago
- Predecessor: Redmi Note 11; Poco X3; Poco F4
- Successor: Redmi Note 13; Poco X6; Poco X6 Pro; Redmi Turbo 3 Poco F6
- Related: Redmi 12; Poco F5 Pro; Redmi Note 10 Pro
- Compatible networks: Note 12/12S/Pro 4G: GSM / CDMA / HSPA / EVDO / LTE; Note 12 5G/Pro 5G/Pro+/Discovery/Speed/Turbo/12R Pro/12T Pro/Poco X5/Pro/F5: GSM / CDMA / HSPA / EVDO / LTE / 5G
- Form factor: Slate
- Dimensions: Note 12: 165.7 mm (6.52 in) H 76 mm (3.0 in) W 7.9 mm (0.31 in) D; Note 12 5G/12R Pro/Poco X5: 165.9 mm (6.53 in) H 76.2 mm (3.00 in) W 8 mm (0.31 in) D; Note 12S: 159.9 mm (6.30 in) H 73.9 mm (2.91 in) W 8.1 mm (0.32 in) D; Note 12 Pro: 164.2 mm (6.46 in) H 76.1 mm (3.00 in) W 8.1 mm (0.32 in) D; Note 12 Pro 5G/Pro Speed/Poco X5 Pro: 162.9 mm (6.41 in) H 76 mm (3.0 in) W 7.9 mm (0.31 in) D; Note 12 Pro+/Discovery: 162.9 mm (6.41 in) H 76 mm (3.0 in) W 9 mm (0.35 in) D; Note 12 Turbo/Poco F5: 161.1 mm (6.34 in) H 75 mm (3.0 in) W 7.9 mm (0.31 in) D; Note 12T Pro: 163.6 mm (6.44 in) H 74.3 mm (2.93 in) W 8.9 mm (0.35 in) D
- Weight: Note 12: 183.5 g (6.47 oz); Note 12 5G/12R Pro: 188 g (6.6 oz); Note 12S: 176 g (6.2 oz); Note 12 Pro: 201.8 g (7.12 oz); Note 12 Pro 5G: 187 g (6.6 oz); Note 12 Pro+: 208.4 g (7.35 oz); Note 12 Discovery: 207.5 g (7.32 oz); Note 12 Pro Speed/Poco X5 Pro: 181 g (6.4 oz); Note 12 Turbo/Poco F5: 181 g (6.4 oz); Note 12T Pro: 200 g (7.1 oz); Poco X5: 189 g (6.7 oz)
- Operating system: Original: Note 12/12S/Turbo/12T Pro: Android 13 with MIUI 14; Note 12 5G/Pro 5G/Pro+/Discovery/12R Pro: Android 12 with MIUI 13; Note 12 Pro: Android 11 with MIUI 13; Note 12 Pro Speed: Android 12 with MIUI 14; Poco X5: Android 12 with MIUI 13 for POCO; Poco X5 Pro: Android 12 with MIUI 14 for POCO; Poco F5: Android 13 with MIUI 14 for POCO; Current: Note 12/12S: Android 15 with Xiaomi HyperOS 2.2; Note 12 5G/Pro 5G/Pro Speed/Pro+/Discovery/12R Pro/Poco X5 Pro: Android 14 with Xiaomi HyperOS 2.2; Note 12 Pro: Android 13 with Xiaomi HyperOS; Note 12T Pro/Turbo/Poco F5: Android 15 with Xiaomi HyperOS 3; Poco X5: Android 14 with Xiaomi HyperOS
- System-on-chip: Note 12: Qualcomm Snapdragon 685 (6 nm); Note 12 5G/12R Pro: Qualcomm Snapdragon 4 Gen 1 (6 nm); Note 12S: MediaTek Helio G96 (12 nm); Note 12 Pro 4G: Qualcomm Snapdragon 732G; Note 12 Pro 5G/Pro+/Explorer: MediaTek Dimensity 1080 (6 nm); Poco X5: Qualcomm Snapdragon 695 (6 nm); Note 12 Pro Speed/Poco X5 Pro: Qualcomm Snapdragon 778G (6 nm); Note 12 Turbo/Poco F5: Qualcomm Snapdragon 7+ Gen 2 (4 nm); Note 12T Pro: MediaTek Dimensity 8200 Ultra (4 nm)
- CPU: Note 12: Octa-core (4x2.8 GHz Kryo 265 Gold & 4x1.9 GHz Kryo 265 Silver); Note 12 5G/12R Pro: Octa-core (2x2.0 GHz Cortex-A78 & 6x1.8 GHz Cortex-A55); Note 12S: Octa-core (2x2.05 GHz Cortex-A76 & 6x2.0 GHz Cortex-A55); Note 12 Pro 4G: Octa-core (2x 2.3 GHz Kryo 470 Gold + 6x 1.8 GHz Kryo 470 Silver); Note 12 Pro 5G/Pro+/Discovery: Octa-core (2x2.6 GHz Cortex-A78 & 6x2.0 GHz Cortex-A55); Poco X5: Octa-core (2x2.2 GHz Kryo 660 Gold & 6x1.7 GHz Kryo 660 Silver); Note 12 Pro Speed/Poco X5 Pro: Octa-core (1x2.4 GHz Cortex-A78 & 3x2.2 GHz Cortex-A78 & 4x1.9 GHz Cortex-A55); Note 12 Turbo/Poco F5: Octa-core (1x2.91 GHz Cortex-X2 & 3x2.49 GHz Cortex-A710 & 4x1.8 GHz Cortex-A510); Note 12T Pro: Octa-core (1x3.1 GHz Cortex-A78 & 3x3.0 GHz Cortex-A78 & 4x2.0 GHz Cortex-A55)
- GPU: Note 12: Adreno 610; Note 12 5G/12R Pro/Poco X5: Adreno 619; Note 12S: Mali-G57 MC2; Note 12 Pro 4G: Adreno 618; Note 12 Pro 5G/Pro+/Discovery: Mali-G68 MC4; Note 12 Pro Speed/Poco X5 Pro: Adreno 642L; Note 12 Turbo/Poco F5: Adreno 725; Note 12T Pro: Mali-G610 MC6
- Memory: Note 12/5G: 4, 6 and 8 GB; Note 12R Pro: 12 GB; Note 12 Pro 5G/Pro Speed: 6, 8 and 12 GB; Note 12 Pro+: 8 and 12 GB; Note 12 Discovery: 8 GB; Note 12 Turbo: 8, 12 and 16 GB; Note 12S/Pro 4G/Poco X5/Pro: 6 and 8 GB; Poco F5: 8 and 12 GB
- Storage: Note 12/12S: 64, 128 and 256 GB; Note 12 5G/Pro 4G/Pro 5G/Pro Speed/Poco X5/Pro: 128 and 256 GB; Note 12 Pro+/Discovery/12R Pro/Poco F5: 256 GB; Note 12 Turbo: 256 and 512 GB; Note 12T Pro: 128, 256 and 512 GB
- Removable storage: Note 12/5G/12S/Pro 4G/Poco X5: micro SD to 1 TB; Note 12 5G (China)/Pro 5G/Pro Speed/Pro+/Discovery/Turbo/12R Pro/12T Pro/Poco X5 Pro/F5: none
- SIM: Dual SIM (Nano-SIM, dual stand-by)
- Battery: Note 12/5G/12S/Pro 4G/Pro 5G/Pro Speed/Pro+/Discovery/Turbo/12R Pro/Poco X5/Pro/F5: Li-Po 5000 mAh; Note 12T Pro: Li-Po 5080 mAh
- Charging: Note 12/5G/12R Pro/12S/Poco X5: Fast charging 33W; Note 12 Pro/Pro 5G/Pro Speed/Turbo/12T Pro/Poco X5 Pro/F5: Fast charging 67W; Note 12 Pro+: Fast charging 120W; Note 12 Explorer: Fast charging 210W
- Rear camera: Note 12: 50 MP, (wide), f/1.8, 0.64µm, PDAF; 8 MP, f/2.2, 119° (ultrawide), 1/4", 1.12µm; 2 MP, f/2.4, (macro); Note 12 5G/12R Pro/Poco X5: 48 MP, (wide), 0.8µm, PDAF; 8 MP, f/2.2, 119° (ultrawide), 1/4", 1.12µm; 2 MP, f/2.4, (macro); Dual-LED dual-tone flash, HDR, panorama; 1080p@30fps; Note 12 5G (China): 48 MP, (wide), 0.8µm, PDAF; 2 MP, f/2.4, (depth); Dual-LED dual-tone flash, HDR, panorama; 1080p@30/60fps; Note 12S: 108 MP, f/1.9, 24mm (wide), 1/1.52", 0.7µm, PDAF; 8 MP, f/1.9, 118° (ultrawide), 1/4", 1.12µm; 2 MP, f/2.4, (macro); Dual-LED dual-tone flash, HDR, panorama; 1080p@30fps; Note 12 Pro 4G: 108 MP, f/1.9, 24mm (wide), 1/1.52", 0.7µm, PDAF; 8 MP, f/1.9, 119° (ultrawide), 1/4", 1.12µm; 2 MP, f/2.4, (macro); 2 MP, f/2.4, (depth); Dual-LED dual-tone flash, HDR, panorama; 4K@30fps, 1080p@30/60/120fps, 720p@960fps; Note 12 Pro 5G: 50 MP, f/1.9, 24mm (wide), 1/1.56", 1.0µm, PDAF, OIS; 8 MP, f/1.9, 119° (ultrawide), 1/4", 1.12µm; 2 MP, f/2.4, (macro); Dual-LED dual-tone flash, HDR, panorama; 4K@30fps, 1080p@30/60/120fps, 720p@960fps; Note 12 Pro+/Explorer: 200 MP, f/1.7, 24mm (wide), 1/1.4", 0.56µm, PDAF, OIS; 8 MP, f/1.9, 119° (ultrawide), 1/4", 1.12µm; 2 MP, f/2.4, (macro); Dual-LED dual-tone flash, HDR, panorama; 4K@30fps, 1080p@30/60/120fps, 720p@960fps; Note 12 Pro Speed/Poco X5 Pro: 108 MP, f/1.9, 24mm (wide), 1/1.52", 0.7µm, PDAF; 8 MP, f/1.9, 119° (ultrawide), 1/4", 1.12µm; 2 MP, f/2.4, (macro); Dual-LED dual-tone flash, HDR, panorama; 4K@30fps, 1080p@30/60/120fps, 720p@960fps; Note 12 Turbo/12T Pro/Poco F5: 64 MP, f/1.79 (wide), 1/2", 0.7µm, PDAF, OIS; 8 MP, f/2.2, 119° (ultrawide), 1/4", 1.12µm; 2 MP, f/2.4, (macro); Dual-LED dual-tone flash, HDR, panorama; 4K@30fps, 1080p@30/60/120fps, 720p@960fps
- Front camera: Note 12/5G/12R Pro/Poco X5: 13 MP, f/2.45, (wide); 1080p@30fps; Note 12 5G (China): 8 MP, f/2.0, (wide), 1/4", 1.12µm; 1080p@30fps; Note 12S/Pro 4G: 16 MP, f/2.4, (wide); 1080p@30fps; Note 12 Pro 5G/Pro+/Explorer/Pro Speed/Poco X5 Pro: 16 MP, f/2.45, (wide), 1/3.06", 1.0µm; 1080p@30/60fps; Note 12 Turbo/Poco F5: 16 MP, f/2.45, (wide); 1080p@30/60fps; Note 12T Pro: 16 MP, (wide); 1080p@30/60fps
- Display: 6.67 in (169 mm); 1080 x 2400 px resolution, 20:9 ratio (~395 ppi density); OLED, 1B colors, 120 Hz, Dolby Vision, HDR10+, 500 nits (typ), 900 nits (HBM)
- Sound: Note 12/5G/12R Pro: speaker; Note 12S/Pro 4G/Pro 5G/Pro+/Explorer/Pro Speed/Turbo/12T Pro/Poco X5/Pro/F5: stereo speakers; All models: 3.5.mm audio jack
- Connectivity: Wi-Fi 802.11 a/b/g/n/ac/6 (except Note 12/5G/12R Pro/Poco X5), dual-band, Wi-Fi Direct, hotspot Bluetooth 5.0 (Note 12/Pro), 5.1 (Note 12 5G/12R Pro/Poco X5), 5.2, 5.3 (Note 12 Turbo/12T Pro/Poco F5), A2DP, LE
- Data inputs: Multi-touch screen; USB Type-C 2.0; Fingerprint scanner (side-mounted); Accelerometer; Gyroscope; Proximity sensor (virtual); Compass
- Water resistance: IP53
- Model: Note 12: 23021RAAEG, 23028RA60L; Note 12 (NFC): 23021RAA2Y; Note 12 5G: 22101317C, 22111317G, 22111317I; Note 12R Pro: 22101317C; Note 12S: 2303CRA44A, 2303ERA42L, 23030RC7Y; Note 12 Pro 4G: 2209116AG; Note 12 Pro 5G: 22101316C, 22101316G, 22101316I; Note 12 Pro+: 22101316UCP, 22101316UG, 22101316UP; Note 12 Discovery: 22101316UC; Note 12 Pro Speed: 22101320C; Note 12 Turbo: 23049RAD8C; Note 12T Pro: 23054RA19C; Poco X5: 22111317PG, 22111317PI; Poco X5 Pro: 22101320G, 22101320I; Poco F5: 23049PCD8G, 23049PCD8I
- Codename: Note 12: tapas; Note 12 (NFC): topaz; Note 12 5G/12R Pro: sunstone; Poco X5: moonstone; Note 12S: ocean; Note 12S (NFC): sea; Note 12 Pro 4G: sweet_k6a; Note 12 Pro 5G: ruby; Note 12 Pro+: rubyplus; Note 12 Discovery: rubypro; Note 12 Pro Speed/Poco X5 Pro: redwood; Poco X5 Pro (India): redwoodin; Note 12 Turbo/Poco F5: marble; Poco F5 (India): marblein; Note 12T Pro: pearl
- Website: www.mi.com/global/product/redmi-note-12/; www.mi.com/global/product/redmi-note-12-5g/; www.mi.com/global/product/redmi-note-12s/; www.mi.com/global/product/redmi-note-12-pro/; www.mi.com/global/product/redmi-note-12-pro-5g/; www.mi.com/global/product/redmi-note-12-pro-plus-5g/; www.po.co/global/product/poco-x5-5g; www.po.co/global/product/poco-x5-pro-5g; www.po.co/global/product/poco-f5

The Redmi Note 12 is a line of Android-based smartphones as part of the Redmi Note series by Redmi, a sub-brand of Xiaomi Inc.

The Redmi Note 12 5G, 12 Pro 5G, 12 Pro+, and 12 Discovery were announced on October 27, 2022. The Redmi Note 12 Pro Speed was announced later on December 27, 2022.

In India, the Redmi Note 12 5G, 12 Pro 5G, and 12 Pro+ were announced on January 5, 2023. The Global Redmi Note 12 5G, compared to the Chinese version, features a better camera setup, fewer memory variations, support for microSD and a green color option replacing white.

On February 2, 2023 Poco announced the Poco X5 and the Xiaomi Poco X5 Pro, where Xiaomi Poco X5 is the Redmi Note 12 5G with a slightly changed design, more powerful CPU, and stereo speakers, and the Poco X5 Pro is a global version of the Redmi Note 12 Pro Speed with a yellow color option instead of green.

On March 3, 2023, the Redmi Note 12 Pro (4G) was announced, which has combined specifications from the Redmi Note 10 Pro and Redmi Note 11 Pro. Also, on March 6, Redmi announced the Redmi Note 12S with minor differences comparing to its predecessor such as back design, absence of a depth sensor and newer software.

On March 28, 2023, the Redmi Note 12 Turbo, which is the first smartphone with Qualcomm Snapdragon 7+ Gen 2, was announced. It was released on the global market as the Poco F5.

On May 29, 2023, the Redmi Note 12T Pro, which has a more powerful CPU and slightly changed camera bump design compared to its predecessor, was announced.

The Redmi Note 12 Pro+ features a 200 MP Samsung HPX sensor, a 120 Watt charging speed and a Mediatek Dimensity 1080. It also has a 4980 mAh battery (LiPo). Other features include IP 53 Dust and Water resistance, headphone jack, IR Blaster, Dolby Vision and Atmos Support and dual stereo speakers.

== Design ==
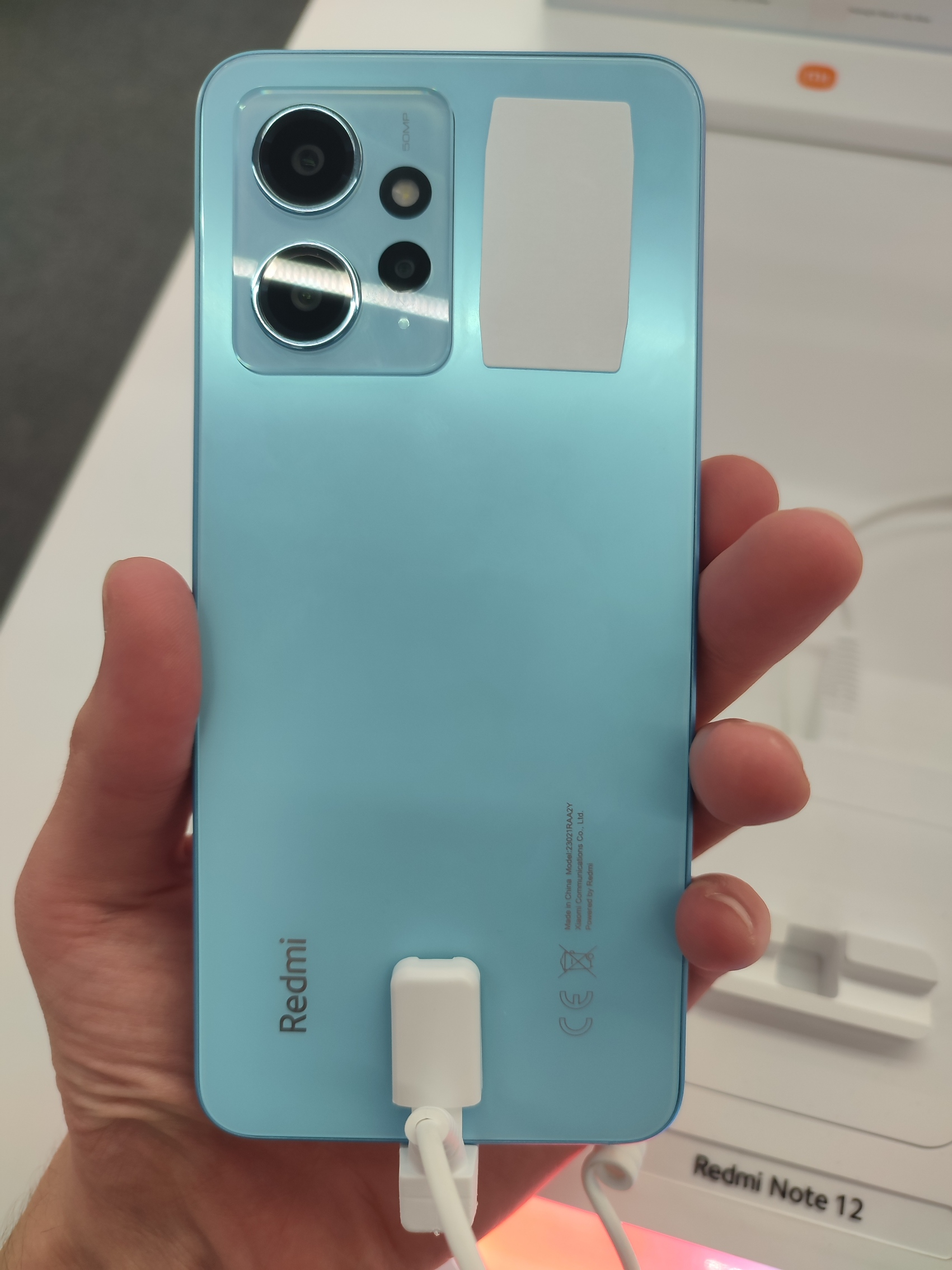
The back of the Redmi Note 12 in Ice Blue

The Redmi Note 12, Note 12 5G/12R Pro, and Poco X5 have a front of Gorilla Glass 3, while the other models have a front of Gorilla Glass 5. The backs of the Redmi Note 12, Note 12 5G, Note 12 Speed/ Poco X5 Pro, Note 12 Turbo/ Poco F5 are made of polycarbonate, while the Redmi for the Note 12 Pro, Note 12 Pro 5G, Note 12 Pro+, and Note 12 Discovery have their back made of glass. The flat frame on all models is made of polycarbonate.

The camera island design of most of the Redmi Note 12 series models and the Poco X5 Pro is similar to that of the Redmi Note 11T Pro. On the other hand, the camera island design on Redmi Note 12 is more similar to Motorola Edge 40 Pro.

On the bottom side of the Redmi Note 12, Note 12 5G/12R Pro, and Poco X5 is a USB-C port, a speaker, and a microphone. On the top side there is an additional microphone, IR blaster and 3.5mm audio jack. On the left is a dual SIM tray in the Chinese version of the Note 12 5G and Note 12R Pro and a hybrid dual SIM tray in the Redmi Note 12 and in the global version of Note 12 5G. A volume rocker and a power button with a mounted fingerprint scanner are on the right side.

In the other models, on the bottom side, there are USB-C port, a speaker, a microphone, and a dual SIM tray. On the top side, there is a 3.5 mm audio jack, an additional microphone, an IR blaster, and a second speaker. The volume rocker and a power button with a mounted fingerprint scanner are on the right side.

Models	Redmi Note 12	Redmi Note 12 5G Redmi Note 12R Pro	Poco X5	Redmi Note 12S	Redmi Note 12 Pro	Redmi Note 12 Pro 5G	Redmi Note 12 Pro Speed Poco X5 Pro	Redmi Note 12 Pro+ Redmi Note 12 Pro Discovery	Redmi Note 12 Turbo Poco F5	Redmi Note 12T Pro
Dimensions	165.7 x 76 x 7.9 m	165.9 x 76.2 x 7.9 m		159.9 x 73.9 x 8.1 m	164.2 x 76.1 x 8.1 m	162.9 x 76 x 7.9 m		162.9 x 76 x 9 m	161.1 x 75 x 7.9 m	163.6 x 74.3 x 8.9 m
Front material	Gorilla Glass 3				Gorilla Glass 5					
Back material	Polycarbonate				Glass		Polycarbonate	Glass	Polycarbonate	
Frame material	Polycarbonate									
Shape of the back	Flat	Curved			Flat			Curved		

== Specifications ==
=== Hardware ===
==== Platform ====
The base version of the Redmi Note 12 uses the Qualcomm Snapdragon 685, while the Redmi Note 12 5G/12R Pro features the Snapdragon 4 Gen 1 processor with support for 5G. The Redmi Note 12 Pro provides the Qualcomm Snapdragon 732G processor on its 4G variant and the MediaTek Dimensity 1080 on its 5G and Pro+ variants.

Models	Redmi Note 12	Redmi Note 12 5G Redmi Note 12R Pro	Poco X5	Redmi Note 12S	Redmi Note 12 Pro	Redmi Note 12 Pro 5G	Redmi Note 12 Pro Speed Poco X5 Pro	Redmi Note 12 Pro+ Redmi Note 12 Pro Discovery	Redmi Note 12 Turbo Poco F5	Redmi Note 12T Pro
SoC	Qualcomm Snapdragon 685	Qualcomm Snapdragon 4 Gen 1	Qualcomm Snapdragon 695	MediaTek Helio G96	Qualcomm Snapdragon 732G	MediaTek Dimensity 1080	Qualcomm Snapdragon 778G	MediaTek Dimensity 1080	Qualcomm Snapdragon 7+ Gen 2	MediaTek Dimensity 8200 Ultra
Fab	6 nm			12 nm	8 nm	6 nm			4 nm	
CPU	4×2.8 GHz Cortex-A73 + 6×1.9 GHz Cortex-A53	2×2.0 GHz Cortex-A78 + 6×1.8 GHz Cortex-A55	2×2.2 GHz Kryo 660 Gold + 6×1.7 GHz Kryo 660 Silver	2×2.05 GHz Cortex-A76 + 6×2.0 GHz Cortex-A55	2×2.2 GHz Kryo 470 Gold + 6×1.8 GHz Kryo 470 Silver	2×2.6 GHz Cortex-A78 + 6×2.0 GHz Cortex-A55	1×2.4 GHz Cortex-A78 + 3×2.2 GHz Cortex-A78 + 4×1.9 GHz Cortex-A55	2×2.6 GHz Cortex-A78 + 6×2.0 GHz Cortex-A55	1×2.91 GHz Cortex-X2 +3×2.49 GHz Cortex-A710 + 4×1.8 GHz Cortex-A510	1×3.1 GHz Cortex-A78 + 3×3.0 GHz Cortex-A78 + 4×2.0 GHz Cortex-A55
GPU	Adreno 610	Adreno 619		Mali-G57 MC2	Adreno 618	Mali-G68 MC4	Adreno 642L	Mali-G68 MC4	Adreno 725	Mali-G610 MC6

==== Battery ====
Most of the Redmi Note 12 series smartphones, Poco X5 series, and Poco F5 feature non-removable batteries with a capacity of 5000 mAh. Only the Redmi Note 12T Pro has a battery with a capacity of 5080 mAh.

The Redmi Note 12, Note 12 5G/12R Pro, Note 12S and Poco X5 feature a 33 W fast charging support, the Redmi Note 12 Pro, Note 12 Pro 5G, Note 12 Pro Speed/Poco X5 Pro, Note 12 Turbo/Poco F5, and Note 12T Pro feature a 67 W fast charging support, the Note 12 Pro+ features a 120 W fast charging support, and the Note 12 Discovery features 210 W fast charging support.

==== Display ====
The Redmi Note 12 Pro 5G, Note 12 Pro+ and Note 12 Discovery feature a 6.67-inch OLED display with a 120 Hz refresh rate and support of Dolby Vision and HDR10+. It has a peak brightness of 900 nits.

==== Sound ====
The Redmi Note 12 and Note 12 5G/12R Pro feature a single speaker on the bottom. Other models have stereo speakers: on the Poco X5, the earpiece speaker serves as the second speaker, while the rest include a dedicated top speaker outlet.

==== Memory ====
The smartphones were sold in the following memory configurations:

Configuration		Smartphone model													
ROM	RAM	Redmi Note 12	Redmi Note 12 5G	Redmi Note 12R Pro	Redmi Note 12S	Redmi Note 12 Pro	Redmi Note 12 Pro 5G	Redmi Note 12 Pro Speed	Redmi Note 12 Pro+	Redmi Note 12 Discovery	Redmi Note 12T Pro	Redmi Note 12 Turbo	Poco F5	Poco X5	Poco X5 Pro
64 GB	4 GB	Yes	No	No	No	No	No	No	No	No	No	No	No	No	No
64 GB	6 GB	Yes	No	No	Yes	No	No	No	No	No	No	No	No	No	No
128 GB	4 GB	Yes	Yes	No	No	No	No	No	No	No	No	No	No	No	No
128 GB	6 GB	Yes	Yes	No	Yes	Yes	Yes	Yes	No	No	No	No	No	Yes	Yes
128 GB	8 GB	Yes	Yes	No	No	Yes	Yes	Yes	No	No	Yes	No	No	No	No
256 GB	8 GB	Yes	Yes	No	Yes	Yes	Yes	Yes	Yes	Yes	Yes	Yes	Yes	Yes	Yes
256 GB	12 GB	No	No	Yes	No	No	Yes	Yes	Yes	No	Yes	Yes	Yes	No	No
256 GB	16 GB	No	No	No	No	No	No	No	No	No	No	Yes	No	No	No
512 GB	12 GB	No	No	No	No	No	No	No	No	No	Yes	Yes	No	No	No
1 TB	16 GB	No	No	No	No	No	No	No	No	No	No	Yes	No	No	No

Preceded by Redmi Note 11/Pro	Redmi Note 12/Pro; 2023	Succeeded by Redmi Note 13/Pro
Preceded by Redmi Note 11S	Redmi Note 12S; 2023	Succeeded by Redmi Note 14S
Preceded by Redmi Note 11 5G	Redmi Note 12 5G; 2022	Succeeded by Redmi Note 13 5G
Preceded by Redmi Note 11 Pro 5G	Redmi Note 12 Pro 5G; 2022	Succeeded by Redmi Note 13 Pro 5G
Preceded by Redmi Note 11 Pro (China)/Xiaomi 11i	Redmi Note 12 Pro 5G; 2022	Succeeded by Redmi Note 13 Pro 5G
Preceded by Redmi Note 11 Pro+/Xiaomi 11i HyperCharge	Redmi Note 12 Pro+ 2022	Succeeded by Redmi Note 13 Pro+
Preceded by Redmi Note 11 Pro+ (India)	Redmi Note 12 Pro+ 2022	Succeeded by Redmi Note 13 Pro+
Preceded by ---	Redmi Note 12R Pro; 2023	Succeeded by Redmi Note 13R Pro
Preceded by Redmi Note 11T Pro	Redmi Note 12 Turbo; 2023	Succeeded by Redmi Turbo 3
Preceded by Redmi Note 11T Pro	Redmi Note 12T Pro; 2023	Succeeded by ---
Preceded by Poco F4	Poco F5; 2023	Succeeded by Poco F6
Preceded by Poco X3/NFC	Poco X5 5G; 2023	Succeeded by Poco X6
Preceded by Poco X4 Pro 5G	Poco X5 Pro 5G; 2023	Succeeded by Poco X6 Pro
