= Xiaomi Mi 4S =

2016 smartphone model

- Manufacturer: Xiaomi
- Type: Smartphone
- Series: Mi
- First released: February 24, 2016; 10 years ago
- Availability by region: China
- Successor: Xiaomi Mi 5s
- Related: Xiaomi Mi 4 Xiaomi Mi 4i Xiaomi Mi 4c
- Compatible networks: GSM, 3G, 4G (LTE)
- Form factor: Slate
- Colors: Black, White, Gold, Pink
- Dimensions: 139.26×70.76×7.8 mm (5.483×2.786×0.307 in)
- Weight: 133 g (5 oz)
- Operating system: Original: Android 5.1.1 Lollipop + MIUI 7 Current: Android 7.0 Nougat + MIUI 10
- System-on-chip: Qualcomm Snapdragon 808 (20 nm)
- CPU: Hexa-core (4×1.4 GHz Cortex-A53 & 2×1.8 GHz Cortex-A57)
- GPU: Adreno 418
- Memory: 2/3 GB LPDDR3
- Storage: 16/64 GB eMMC 5.0
- SIM: Dual SIM (Nano-SIM)
- Battery: Non-removable, Li-Ion 3260 mAh, 18W fast charging, Quick Charge 2.0
- Rear camera: 13 MP Sony IMX258, f/2.0, 24 mm (wide), 1/3", 1.12 µm, PDAF; Dual-LED flash, HDR, panorama Video: 1080p@30fps, 720p@30fps
- Front camera: 5 MP, f/2.0, 85° (wide); Video: 1080p@30fps, 720p@30fps
- Display: IPS LCD, 5", 1920 × 1080 (FHD), 16:9, 441 ppi
- Sound: Mono
- Connectivity: USB-C 2.0, 3.5 mm jack, Bluetooth 4.1 (A2DP), IrDA, Wi-Fi 802.11 a/b/g/n/ac (dual-band, Wi-Fi Direct), GPS (A-GPS), GLONASS, BeiDou
- Model: 2015911
- Codename: aqua
- Made in: China
- Other: Fingerprint sensor (rear-mounted), Proximity sensor, ambient light sensor, accelerometer, gyroscope, compass, notification LED, Hall effect sensor

The Xiaomi Mi 4S is a smartphone developed by Xiaomi as a high end version of the Xiaomi Mi 4c. It was announced on February 24, 2016, at MWC 2016 along with the Xiaomi Mi 5. Also it was initially launched on March 1, 2016 and skyrocketed to 200,000 units in China.

== Specifications ==
=== Design ===
The back panel and screen are made of glass, and the frame is made of aluminium.

On the bottom are the USB-C port and the speaker and microphone grilles; on top are the 3.5 mm audio jack, a second microphone, and an IR port; on the left is the tray for 2 SIM cards, and on the right are the volume rocker and power button. The fingerprint scanner is located on the back panel.

The Mi 4S was sold in 4 colors: Black, White, Gold, and Pink.

=== Hardware ===
The Mi 4S features a Qualcomm Snapdragon 808 processor with an Adreno 418 GPU. It also has a hexa-core CPU consisting of 4x 1.4 GHz Cortex-A53 cores & 2x 1.8 GHz Cortex-A57 cores respectively. The device was sold in 2/16 GB, 3/16 GB, and 3/64 GB configurations.

The battery has a capacity of 3260 mAh. It also supports 18-watt Quick Charge 2.0 fast charging.

The Mi 4S features an IPS LCD sizing at 5 inches, with an FHD resolution (1920 × 1080), a 16:9 aspect ratio and a pixel density of 441 ppi.

=== Camera ===
The Mi 4S has a main camera with a resolution of 13 MP, an aperture of f/2.0, and phase-detection autofocus, and a front camera with a resolution of 5 MP and an aperture of f/2.0. Both cameras can record video at up to 1080p resolution at 30 frames per second.

=== Software ===
The Mi 4S was released running MIUI 7 based on Android 5.1.1 Lollipop and was updated to MIUI 10 based on Android 7.0 Nougat.

== See also ==
- Xiaomi Mi 4
- Xiaomi Mi 5
