= Hugo Barra =

Brazilian computer scientist

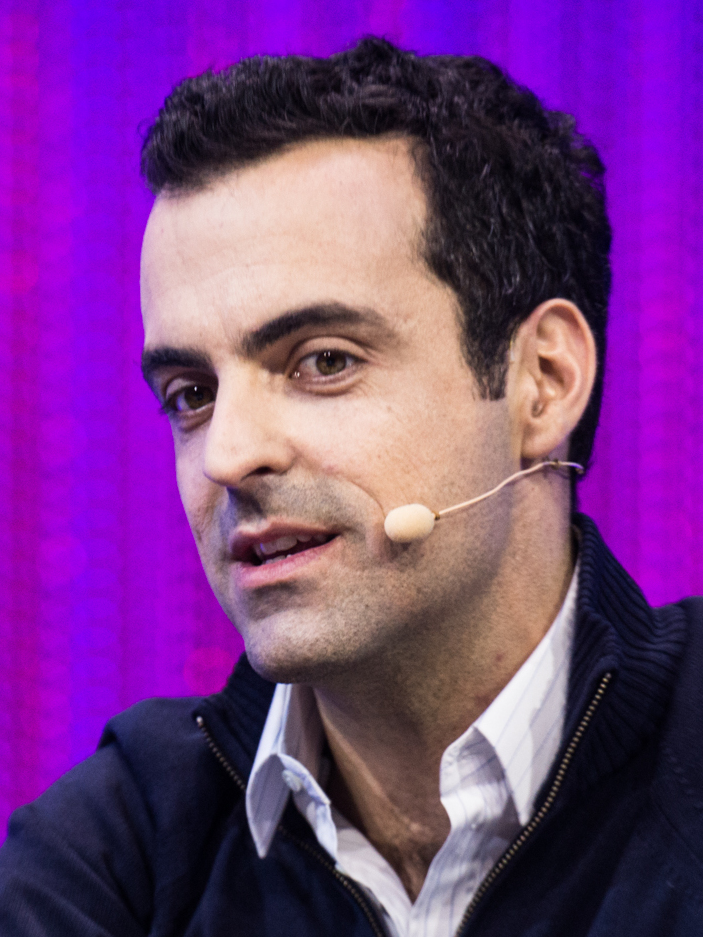
- Barra in 2013
- Born: 28 October 1976 (age 50); Belo Horizonte, Brazil
- Other name: Chinese: 虎哥 ("Tiger Brother")
- Education: MIT (M.Eng.) (B.S.); UFMG
- Occupations: Detect, CEO
- Years active: 1999–present
- Known for: Vice President Android, Google; Vice President, Xiaomi; Vice President VR, Meta; Head of Oculus, Meta
- Awards: Fortune 40-Under-40; Wired 100

Hugo Barra (born 28 October 1976) is a Brazilian computer scientist, technology executive and entrepreneur. From 2008 to 2013, he worked in a number of product management roles at Google, including vice president and product spokesperson of its Android division. From 2013 to 2017, he worked at Xiaomi as vice president of global operations. From 2017 to 2021, he worked as vice president of Virtual Reality and head of the Oculus division at Meta Platforms (formerly Facebook). In May 2021, he left Meta to join health technology startup Detect as CEO.

== Early life and education ==
Barra attended primary and secondary schools at local Colégio Pitágoras in Belo Horizonte, Brazil, and in 1995 enrolled at the Federal University of Minas Gerais, majoring in Electrical Engineering.

In 1996, Barra transferred to the Massachusetts Institute of Technology (MIT), graduating with bachelor's degrees in electrical engineering & computer science (EECS), and management science, as well as a master's degree in electrical engineering & computer science. He was class president of the Class of 2000 and student keynote speaker at MIT Commencement 2000.

== Career ==
In 1999, Barra co-founded mobile software startup Lobby7 with other MIT classmates with investment from SoftBank Group. In 2003, the company was acquired by speech recognition technology company ScanSoft, which subsequently became Nuance Communications. While at Nuance from 2003 to 2007, Barra led a multi-year project alongside CTO Vlad Sejnoha to incorporate the company's flagship Dragon NaturallySpeaking speech-to-text dictation technology into Lobby7's cloud-based platform, which is rumored to have been the foundation to Apple Inc.'s Siri voice assistant.

=== Google ===
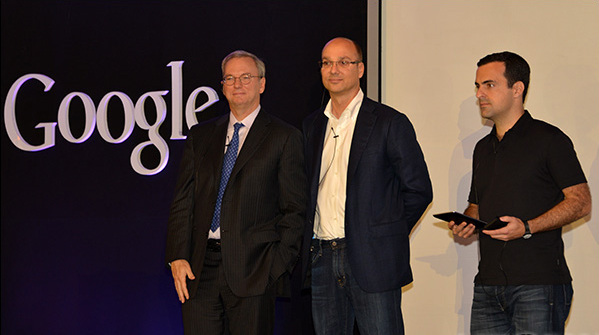
Barra with Eric Schmidt and Andy Rubin at the launch of the Nexus 7

Barra joined American technology company Google in London in March 2008 as Group Product Manager for the Google Mobile team. In the Google Mobile team, Barra led the development of several early versions of Google's flagship mobile applications, such as Google Voice Search, which became the technological foundation for the Google Assistant, as well as Google Maps Navigation with vector-based graphics, Google Translate with "conversation mode", the Google Goggles visual recognition app, and several others.

In 2010 Barra joined the Android team as Director of Product Management. From 2010 to 2013, Barra's role expanded to include product spokesperson for the Android team, speaking at press events and Google I/O, Google's annual developer-focused conference. Barra headlined the main keynote presentation at Google IO 2011, Google IO 2012, and Google IO 2013. Barra's product leadership included the entire Android ecosystem of software and hardware, including Honeycomb, Ice Cream Sandwich, Jelly Bean and KitKat operating system launches, the Nexus 4 and Nexus 5 smartphones, the Nexus 7 and Nexus 10 tablets, and other related products such as Google Now, selected in 2013 as Popular Science's Innovation of the Year. He was promoted to Vice President of Android Product Management in 2012. By September 2013, one billion Android devices had been activated globally.

=== Xiaomi ===
In September 2013, Barra left Google for Chinese electronics company Xiaomi, serving as Vice President of Global Operations based in Beijing, China. The move was considered a ‘significant hire’ for Xiaomi, one of the fastest growing manufacturers in China, enhancing international legitimacy to the company by adding a key former Google Android executive to its senior management.

In December 2013, Barra spoke at LeWeb tech conference in Paris, France about his impressions of the Chinese economy and the opportunity it represented for tech companies such as Xiaomi, citing China's 600 million internet users, high market caps of recent Chinese IPOs, the massive scale of the top Chinese apps' monthly active users, and the size of companies such as Alibaba's Taobao, a shopping site more than double the size of eBay and Amazon combined.

In February 2014, Barra announced the launch of the new Redmi and Mi 3 smartphones in Singapore. Global expansion outside of China into surrounding emerging markets was a key initiative for Xiaomi, given the company's business model to release high-performance smartphone products at an affordable consumer price, generating revenue not only from the hardware itself, but the software and internet services provided to the consumer. According to Xiaomi co-founder and CEO Lei Jun, it is "entirely Barra’s job to figure out which region that we should enter next and how." Barra stated his intention to expand next into various countries.

In March 2014, Barra visited Terry Gou at Foxconn in Shenzhen, a Taiwan-based global company with plants in Asia, Brazil and Mexico responsible for assembling products for various tech brands, indicating plans for Xiaomi to further expand into India, Indonesia and Latin America. The partnership began to bear fruit in August 2015 when Barra, Foxconn and chief minister N. Chandrababu Naidu jointly announced the launch of a manufacturing facility in the state of Andhra Pradesh in India, with support from the central government's Make in India program.

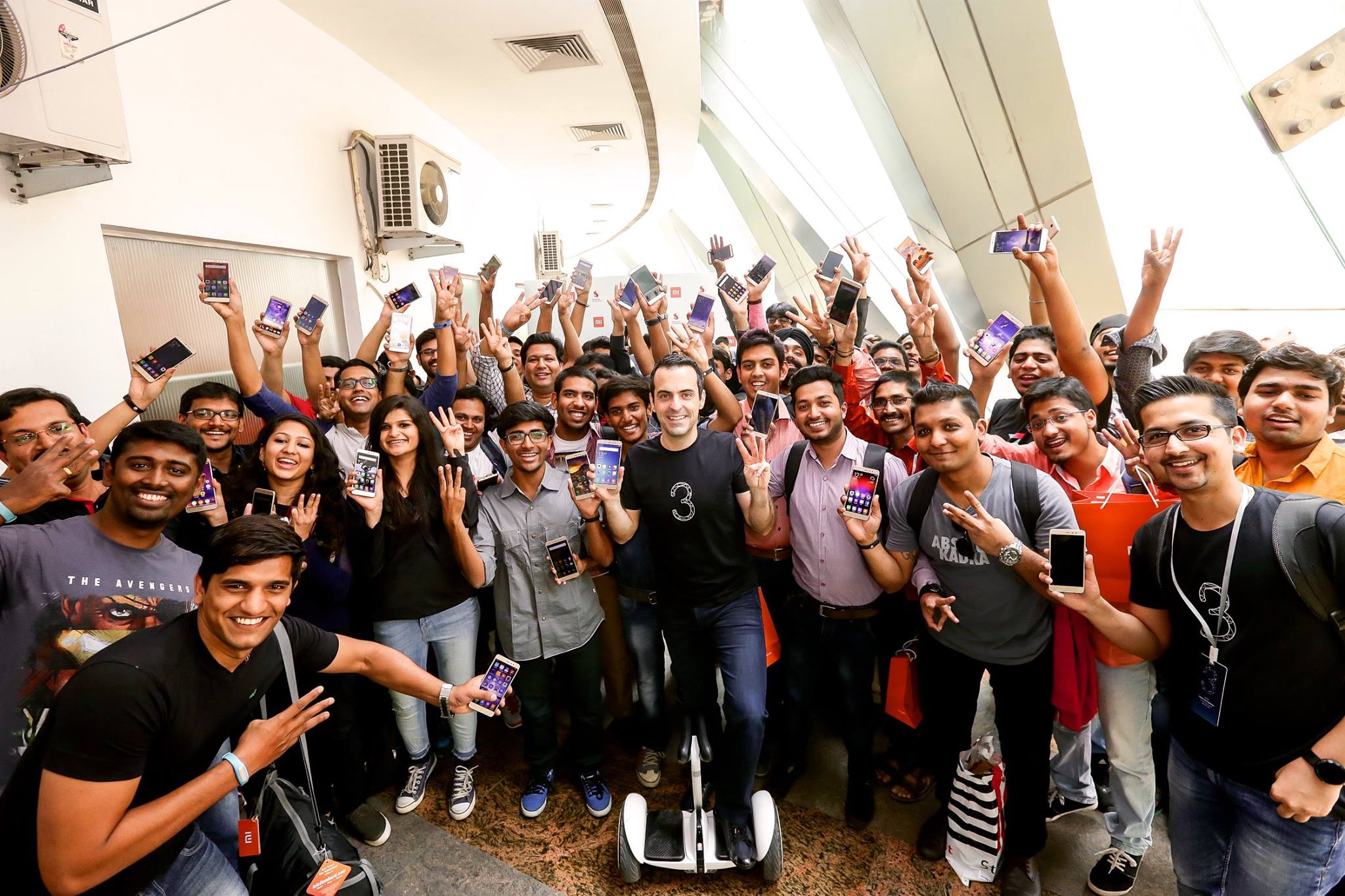
Xiaomi fans gathering with Barra prior to the Redmi Note 3 launch event in New Delhi (February 2016)

In February 2016, Barra launched the Redmi Note 3 smartphone in India at a major press event in New Delhi's Talkatora Stadium with 8,000 fans in attendance where the company announced the world's first smartphone to use the Qualcomm Snapdragon 650 chipset. Industry analysts and reviewers considered this product Xiaomi's biggest hit in the Indian market due to its unique combination of performance, high-quality display, large-capacity battery and affordable price. Redmi Note 3 became India's best online selling phone with 2.3 million units sold through September 2016, propelling Xiaomi to become the second largest smartphone brand in India by Q4 2016.

Barra also led the expansion of Xiaomi into several other markets such as Southeast Asia (starting with Malaysia, Indonesia, Philippines), Latin America (starting with his home country Brazil), Western Europe (starting with Spain), Russia, and even led a modest early entry into the U.S., developing and promoting not only Xiaomi smartphones but also products from its Mi Ecosystem of smart connected products, including wearables, TVs, home appliances, toys, and many others.

In January 2017, Barra announced his departure from Xiaomi. There are reports that quoted Barra saying that his resignation was prompted by family or health reasons and some analysts noted that the departure came amid Xiaomi's declining sales in China. Around the time of his resignation, Xiaomi announced that it had exceeded US$1 billion in revenue from India alone and went on to become the largest smartphone brand in India in Q3 2017, months after Barra left the company. In Q1 2018, Xiaomi became the 4th largest smartphone brand in the world.

In July 2018, Xiaomi launched its initial public offering in the Hong Kong Stock Exchange, raising US$4.72 billion in capital, and valuing the company at US$54 billion, in the world's largest technology IPO since Alibaba went public in 2014. Barra's stake in Xiaomi was rumored to have been worth over US$200 million at the time of the IPO.

=== Facebook ===
On 25 January 2017 Facebook CEO Mark Zuckerberg announced on his Facebook page that Barra would be joining Facebook as Vice President of Virtual Reality and Head of the Oculus division, including a photo of the two of them posing as avatars in a virtual scene.

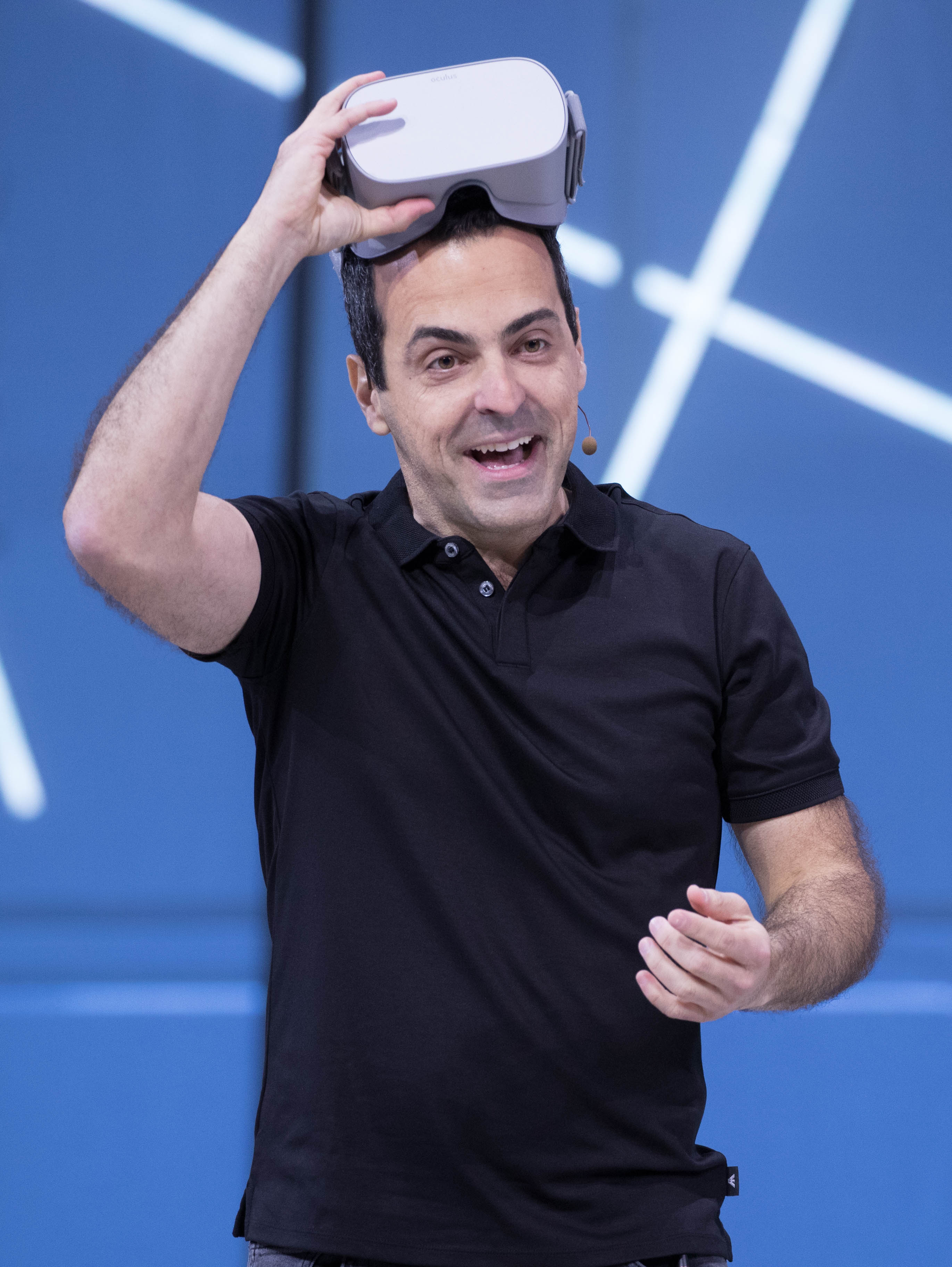
Barra demonstrating the Oculus Go at 2018's Facebook F8 conference

Barra's initial focus at Oculus was on the development of standalone VR headsets as well as social VR applications. On 11 October 2017, during the Oculus Connect 4 developer conference, Zuckerberg and Barra unveiled Oculus Go, the industry's first mass-market standalone VR headset, priced at $199. This device was co-developed with Barra's former employer Xiaomi in partnership with Qualcomm, which Barra and Qualcomm President and fellow Brazilian Cristiano Amon jointly announced at the 2018 Consumer Electronics Show (CES).

On 26 September 2018, Zuckerberg and Barra were back on stage at Oculus Connect 5 to announce Oculus Quest, the next major development in standalone VR technology. The headset was well received by industry experts due to the high-quality spatial experience it was capable of delivering. Oculus Quest supported positional tracking with six degrees of freedom using internal sensors and an array of cameras in the front of the headset rather than external sensors like in the original Oculus Rift PC-connected headset. The cameras could also be used in "Passthrough" mode to enhance safety if the user exits their designated boundary area. The headset earned multiple industry awards and accolades.

In September 2020, Barra announced on Twitter that Facebook and Ray-Ban were working on a partnership to co-develop smartglasses, which officially launched on 9 September 2021 as Ray-Ban Stories just a few months after Barra had left the company.

In May 2021, Barra left Meta and immediately joined Detect, a health technology startup he was involved in co-founding.

=== Detect ===
Since March 2020, Barra has been involved in various roles with Detect, a health technology startup he co-founded with scientist and entrepreneur Jonathan Rothberg to develop consumer-grade molecular diagnostics products. The company's first product is an FDA-cleared Covid-19 molecular at-home test.

=== Dreamer ===
In 2024, Barra co-founded the artificial intelligence startup Dreamer with David Singleton and Nicholas Jitkoff. The company launched a beta version of its platform, described as an operating system for AI agents and agentic applications, in February 2026. In March 2026, Dreamer's team joined Meta Superintelligence Labs under a technology licensing arrangement with Meta.

== Personal ==
Barra is married, has three children and lives in the San Francisco Bay Area.

== Lists ==
In 2011, Barra was ranked #23 in Wired Magazine's Wired 100. In 2013, Business Insider's Silicon Valley 100 included Barra at #92. Brazil's Época magazine ranked Barra among the most influential Brazilians in both 2011 and 2013. In 2015, Barra was ranked #14 in the 40-Under-40 list by Fortune Magazine. Barra is a member of the World Economic Forum Young Global Leaders (YGL) Class of 2015.
