= Xiaomi Mi 5s Plus =

Android smartphone model

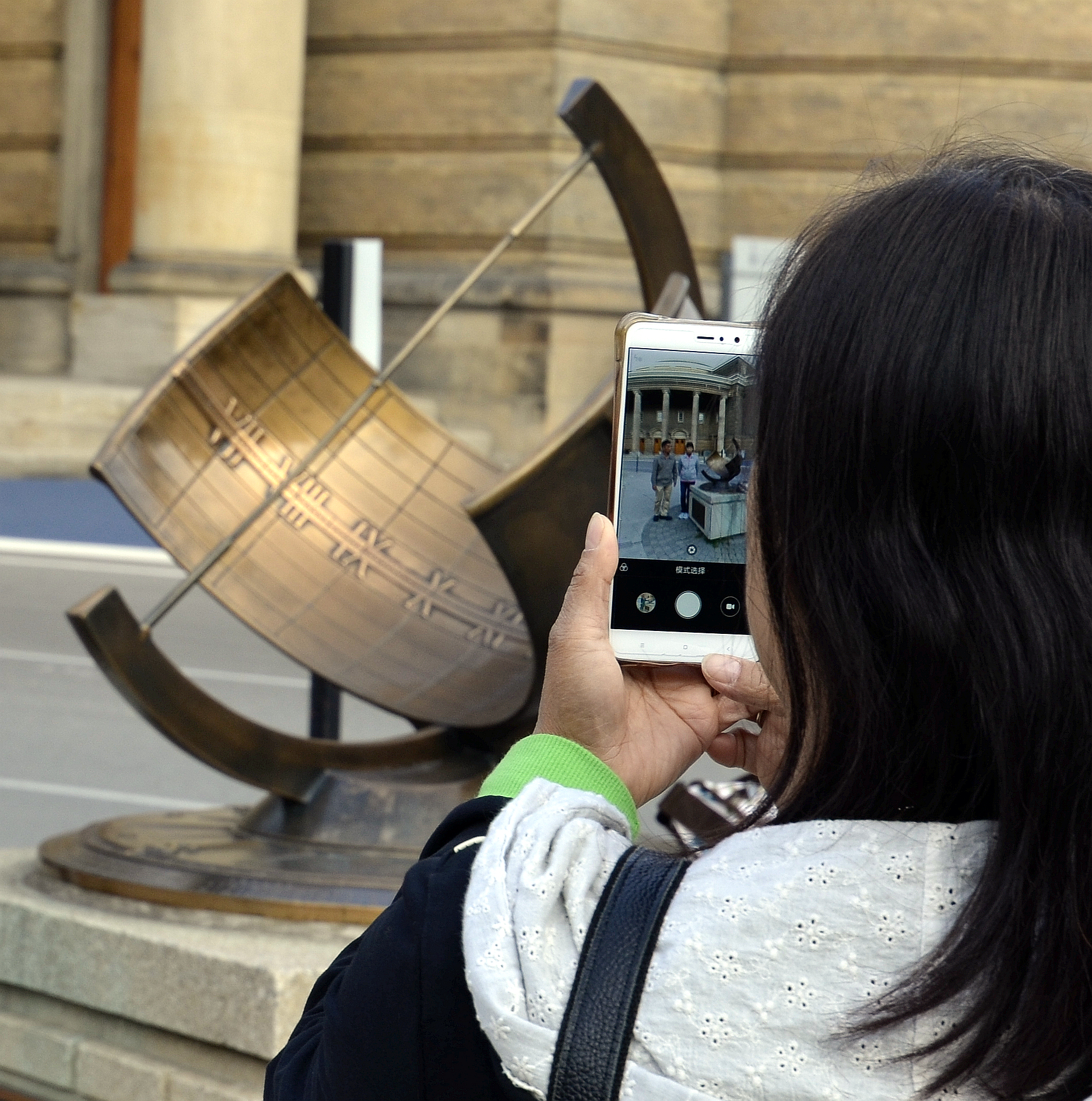
- A woman takes a photo on the Mi 5s Plus
- Manufacturer: Xiaomi
- Type: Phablet
- Series: Mi
- First released: 27 September 2016; 9 years ago
- Predecessor: Xiaomi Mi 5
- Successor: Xiaomi Mi 6
- Related: Xiaomi Mi 5s Xiaomi Mi 5c
- Compatible networks: GSM, 3G, 4G (LTE)
- Form factor: Slate
- Dimensions: 154.6×77.7×8 mm (6.09×3.06×0.31 in)
- Weight: 168 g (6 oz)
- Operating system: Initial: Android 6.0 Marshmallow + MIUI 8 Current: Global: Android 8.0 Oreo + MIUI 10; Chinese: Android 8.0 Oreo + MIUI 11
- CPU: Qualcomm MSM8996 Snapdragon 821 (14 nm), 4 cores (2×2.35 GHz Kryo & 2×2.2 GHz Kryo)
- GPU: Adreno 530
- Memory: 4/6 GB, LPDDR4
- Storage: 64/128 GB, UFS 2.0
- Battery: Non-removable, Li-Ion 3800 mAh
- Charging: 18W Quick Charge; Quick Charge 3.0
- Rear camera: 13 MP, f/2.0, 1/3.1", 1.12 μm, PDAF + 13 MP (B/W), f/2.0, 1/3.1", 1.12 μm 2- LED dual-tone flash, HDR, panorama Video: 4K@30fps, 1080p@30fps
- Front camera: 4 Mp, f/2.0, 1/3", 2 μm 1080p@30fps
- Display: IPS, 5.7", 1920 × 1080 (FullHD), 16:9, 386 ppi
- Connectivity: USB-C 2.0, 3.5 mm audio jack, Bluetooth 4.2 (A2DP, LE), IR-port, NFC, Wi-Fi 802.11 a/b/g/n/ac ( dual-band, Wi-Fi Direct, DLNA, hotspot), GPS, A-GPS, GLONASS, BDS
- Model: 2016070
- Codename: natrium
- Other: Fingerprint scanner (rear), proximity sensor, accelerometer, gyroscope, compass, barometer

The Xiaomi Mi 5s Plus is a flagship Android smartphone from the Chinese company Xiaomi, which is a modification of the Xiaomi Mi 5. It was presented on September 27, 2016, with Xiaomi Mi 5s. This is the first smartphone of the Mi series to receive a rear dual-camera setup.

== Design ==
The front is made of glass, while the body of the smartphone is made of polished aluminum.

At the bottom there is a USB-C connector, a speaker and a microphone stylized as a speaker. On top are 3.5 mm audio jack, a second microphone and IR port. On the left side of the smartphone, there is a slot for 2 SIM cards. On the right side are the volume buttons and the smartphone lock button. The fingerprint scanner is located on the back panel.

The Mi 5s Plus was sold in 4 colors: gray, silver, gold and Rose Gold.

== Specifications ==
=== Platform ===
The Mi 5s Plus is equipped with the Qualcomm Qualcomm Snapdragon 821 SoC with an overclocked CPU (2×2.35 GHz Kryo & 2×2.2 GHz Kryo), which works with Adreno 530 GPU.

=== Battery ===
The battery received a 3800 mAh capacity and support for 18-watt Quick Charge 3.0 fast charging.

=== Camera ===
The smartphone features a dual main camera with 13 Mp, f/2.0 main lens and B/W lens. The main lens features a phase detection autofocus and the ability to record video at up to 4K@30fps. The front camera received a resolution of 4 MP, an aperture of f/2.0 and the ability to record video at up to 1080p@30fps.

=== Screen ===
Screen IPS, 5.7", FullHD (1920 × 1080) with an aspect ratio of 16:9 and a pixel density of 386 ppi.

=== Memory ===
The smartphone was sold in configurations of 4/64 and 6/128 GB.

=== Software ===
The Mi 5s Plus was launched on MIUI 8 based on Android 6.0 Marshmallow. The global version of the firmware has been updated to MIUI 10 and the Chinese version was updated to MIUI 11. Both are based on Android 8.0 Oreo.

The Mi 5s Plus allows bootloader unlocking and custom ROMs installs, and as a result the phone can be updated to Android 15 with the degoogled lineageOS or LineageOS with microG.

== Controversy ==
- The rear fingerprint sensor and non-metal integrated design of Mi 5s Plus have been criticized by many netizens. Some technology media even said, "When we simply compare Mi 5s and Mi 5s Plus, it is difficult for us to believe that they are a series of models." Named Mi 5s The Plus version has almost no similarities in appearance and design, which is the most controversial aspect of Mi 5s Plus.
- The dual-camera imaging quality of Mi 5s Plus has dropped significantly compared to Mi 5 and Mi 5s. DxOMark, a well-known French image evaluation media, gave Mi 5s Plus a score of 78 points, including 80 points for static images and 80 points for video. 74 points.
- Mi 5s Plus did not activate the NFC-based bus card simulation service when it was launched, causing netizens to complain. and due to system scheduling reasons, the lag is more obvious in high-load scenarios such as games.
