= Xiaomi Mi 5c =

Smartphones manufactured by Xiaomi

- Manufacturer: Xiaomi
- Type: Smartphone
- Series: Mi
- First released: March 2017
- Predecessor: Xiaomi Mi 4c
- Related: Xiaomi Mi 5 Xiaomi Mi 5s Xiaomi Mi 5s Plus; Xiaomi Mi 5X
- Form factor: Slate phone
- Dimensions: 144.38×69.68×7.09 mm (5.684×2.743×0.279 in)
- Weight: 135 g (5 oz)
- Operating system: MIUI 8 (Android 7.1)
- System-on-chip: Xiaomi pinecone S1
- CPU: 2x Dual-core 2.2GHz + 2x Dual-core 1.4GHz
- GPU: Mali-T860 4x Quad-core
- Memory: 3 GB RAM
- Storage: 64 GB EMMC 5.0
- Battery: Non-removable Li-Po 2860mAh（typ）/ 2810mAh（min）battery
- Rear camera: 12 MP
- Front camera: 8 MP
- Display: 5.15" 1920*1080 pixels, 16M colors
- Connectivity: Wi-Fi 802.11 a/b/g/n/ac, dual-band, Wi-Fi Direct, WiFi Display, hotspot 2G: GSM 2/ 3/ 8/ 3G: TD-SCDMA 34/ 39/ 4G: TD-LTE 38/ 39/ 40/ 41/ Bluetooth 4.1, Bluetooth HD, FM
- Codename: meri
- Other: The baseband algorithm can be upgraded with OTA
- Website: www.mi.com/mi5c/

The Xiaomi Mi 5c (Chinese: 小米手机 5c) is a smartphone developed by Xiaomi Inc. It is part of Xiaomi's high-end smartphone line, and was released in March 2017. It was the first smartphone to launch with Surge S1, Xiaomi's first SoC chipset and its bid to reduce its reliance on industry suppliers like Qualcomm.
