= Xiaomi Mi 4 =

Smartphone by Xiaomi

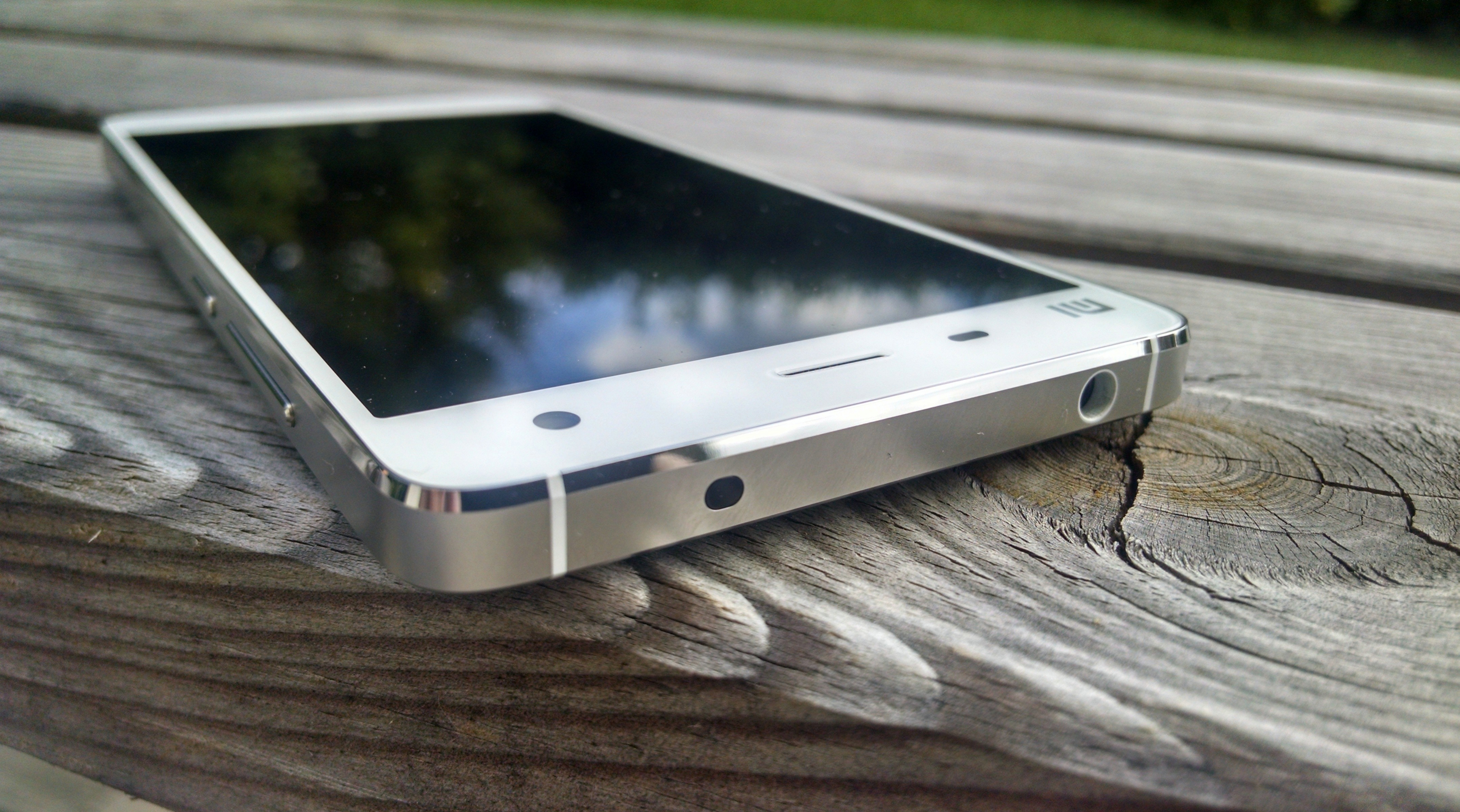
- Manufacturer: Xiaomi Inc.
- Type: Smartphone
- Series: Mi
- First released: August 2014; 11 years ago
- Availability by region: August 2014, January 2015 (India)
- Predecessor: Xiaomi Mi 3
- Successor: Xiaomi Mi 4S; Xiaomi Mi 5
- Related: Xiaomi Mi 4i Xiaomi Mi 4c
- Compatible networks: GSM, CDMA, WCDMA, 3G, EVDO, HSDPA and optionally LTE
- Form factor: Slate
- Dimensions: 139.2 mm (5.48 in) H 68.5 mm (2.70 in) W 8.9 mm (0.35 in) D
- Weight: 149 g (5.26 oz)
- Operating system: Original: MIUI v5 (Android 4.4 Kitkat); Current: MIUI 9 (Android 6.0 Marshmallow); Windows 10 Mobile (up to version 1607) released 3 December 2015
- CPU: 2.5 GHz Qualcomm Snapdragon 801 MSM8974AC Quad-Core Krait 400
- GPU: Adreno 330 578MHz
- Memory: 2 or 3 GB LPDDR3 RAM
- Storage: 16 or 64 GB eMMC 5.0
- Battery: 3080 mAh
- Rear camera: 13 MP back-side illuminated sensor, HD video (2160p) at 30 frame/s, IR filter, dual warm/cool LED flashes, aperture f/1.8, facial recognition, image stabilization burst mode
- Front camera: 8 MP, HD video (1080p)
- Display: 5 in (130 mm) diagonal (16:9 aspect ratio), multi-touch display, LED backlit IPS TFT LCD, 1080x1920 pixels at 441 ppi
- Data inputs: Multi-touch touchscreen display, microphone, gyroscope, accelerometer, digital compass, proximity sensor, ambient light sensor
- SAR: 1.36 W/kg (head)
- Website: www.mi.com/en/mi4

The Xiaomi Mi 4 (Chinese: 小米手机4) is a smartphone developed by the Chinese electronics manufacturer Xiaomi for its high-end smartphone line, and was released in August 2014. Xiaomi held an event to formally introduce the high-end phone, and its complementary smart-accessory, the Xiaomi MiBand, during the Xiaomi New Product Launch Event 2014 on 22 July 2014.

Similar to the principle of the Xiaomi Mi2, the Mi 4 is a highly revamped version of its predecessor, the Xiaomi Mi3. The phone is of a different design to its predecessor. It was also released slightly before the new MIUI 6, which was introduced in August 2014.

Reception towards the device was generally positive, though there were still a high amount of negative feedback from users of Apple's iPhone due to its similar design and quality. Some media companies hailed it to be one of the best smartphones available in the market due to its high-end hardware which is sold at a lower price compared to competitor smartphones. However, others criticized it for being too similar to Apple's iPhone 5S.

== History ==
Before its official unveiling, media speculation primarily focused on leaks; including photos of the early prototypes of the device and screenshots of MIUI 6, these leaks were later proven to be fake.

Xiaomi announced the Mi 4 and MiBand during a media event at the CNCC on 22 July 2014. While the device was announced in July 2014, it didn't become available until August 2014, shortly before unveiling MIUI 6.

In August 2014, the Mi 4 was released in China and then to other countries. Xiaomi operated in a limited, however expanding, list of countries and consumers outside of the countries it operates in have to buy it online.

== Features ==
=== Operating system and software ===
The Xiaomi Mi 4 ships with MIUI V5 (upgradable to MIUI V10), Xiaomi's variant of the Android operating system. The user interface of MIUI is based on the concept of direct manipulation, using multi-touch gestures. Interface control elements consist of sliders, switches, and buttons. Interaction with the OS includes gestures such as swipe, tap, pinch and reverse pinch, all of which have specific definitions within the context of the Android operating system and its multi-touch interface. Internal accelerometers are used by some applications to respond to the movement of the device such as rotating it vertically (one common result is switching from portrait to landscape mode). The device includes an updater application that allows it to update its OS to the latest version of MIUI available to it.

==== Windows 10 Mobile ROM Port ====
In March 2015, it was announced that selected registered users of Mi 4 devices in China would receive a ROM port of the Windows 10 Mobile operating system as a trial partnership between Xiaomi and Microsoft. The ROM flash download was released for these users in June 2015, who could then test the software on their devices and provide feedback to both Microsoft and Xiaomi.

=== Design ===
The device has a 5-inch (12.7 cm) Sharp/JDI OGS fully laminated touchscreen, with a screen resolution of 1080x1920 at a pixel density of 441 ppi. Its home button is similar to its predecessor and is mainly touch-based with adjustable haptic feedback. The phone itself weighs 149 grams (5.26 oz) and uses a stainless steel frame. The device is currently available in three color finishes, black, white and rose gold.

=== Hardware ===
The Xiaomi Mi 4 is powered by a Qualcomm Snapdragon 801 (MSM8974-AC) chipset, which, at one point made it the fastest Android smartphone to date according to the AnTuTu benchmark application. Its processor is a quad-core 2.5 GHz Krait 400 and its graphics card is an Adreno 330. The phone includes a 3080 mAh battery, which provides 280 hours of standby time. It comes with a 13 megapixel primary camera and an 8 megapixel secondary camera. Xiaomi also released another model of Mi 4 with 64 GB of internal memory.

=== Accessories ===
The Xiaomi Mi 4 was announced with a complementary US$12 smart accessory known as the Xiaomi Mi Band which is a waterproof sleep-cycle smart alarm, fitness monitor, sleep tracker and remote smartphone unlocker. It comes in various exchangeable bands and has a 30-day battery capacity.

== Compatibility with CyanogenMod and dual-boot ==
The phone is compatible with CM13, CM14.1 and supports true dual-boot.
