= Xiaomi Mi 3 =

Smartphone by Xiaomi

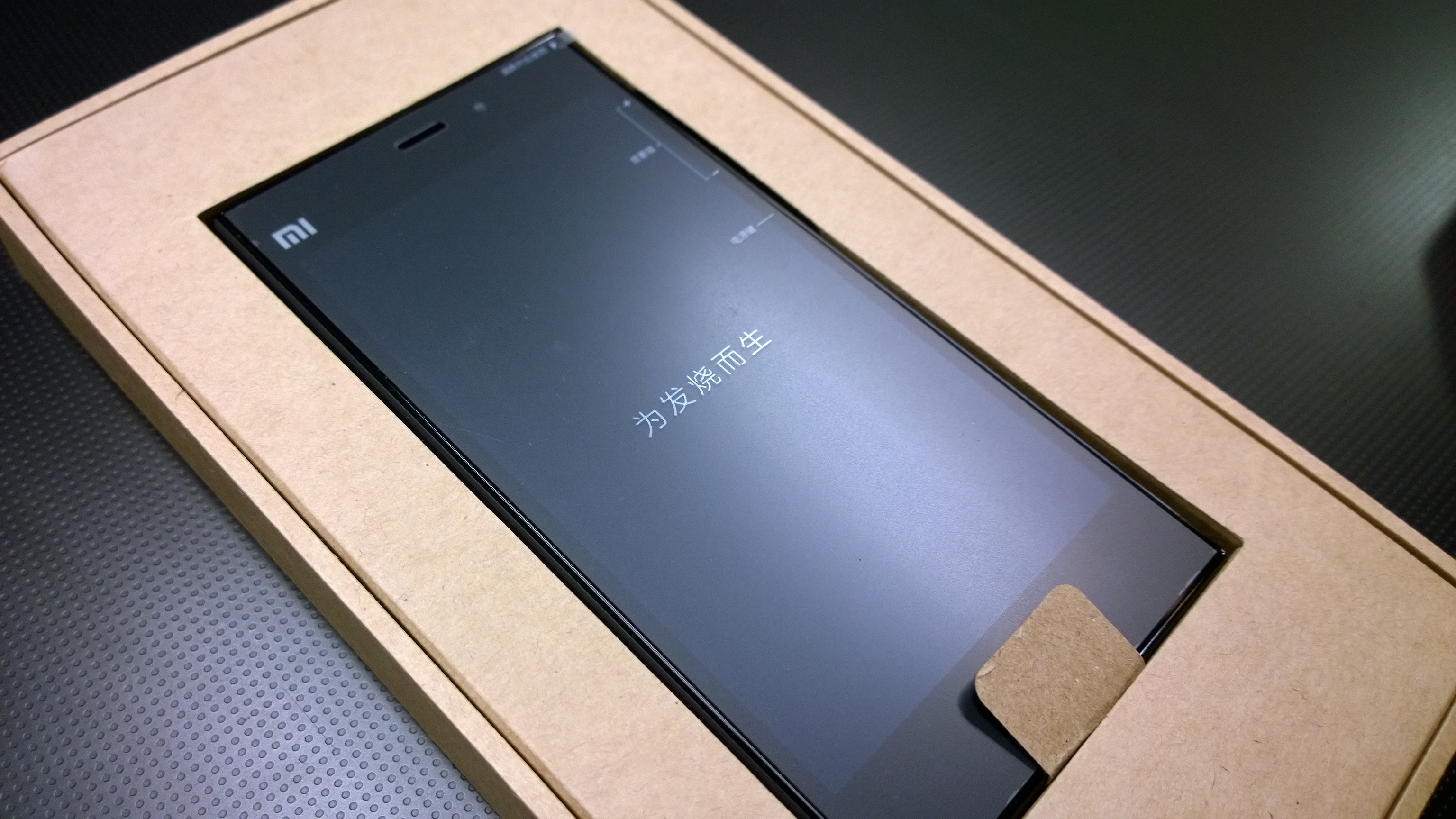
- Manufacturer: Xiaomi
- Type: Smartphone
- Series: Mi
- Availability by region: China November 2013; Hong Kong November 2013; Taiwan November 2013; Singapore March 2014; Malaysia May 2014; Philippines June 2014; India July 2014
- Predecessor: Xiaomi Mi2, Xiaomi Mi2S
- Successor: Xiaomi Mi4
- Related: Xiaomi Mi1, Xiaomi Mi2A
- Compatible networks: GSM 850, 900, 1800, and 1900MHz & WCDMA 850, 900, 1900 and 2100MHz
- Form factor: Slate
- Dimensions: 144 mm (5.7 in) H 73.6 mm (2.90 in) W 8.1 mm (0.32 in)
- Weight: 145 g (5.1 oz)
- Operating system: Original: MIUI V5 (Android 4.3 Jelly Bean) Current: MIUI 9 (Android 4.4 Kitkat for TD-LTE Version) (Android 6.0 Marshmallow for WCDMA/CDMA Version)
- CPU: 2.3 GHz Qualcomm Snapdragon 800 MSM8274AB/8674AB Quad-Core Krait 400 (WCDMA/CDMA) 1.8 GHz Nvidia Tegra 4 4+1 Core Cortex-A15 (TD-LTE)
- GPU: Adreno 330 (WCDMA/CDMA) Geforce 72-cores (TD-LTE)
- Memory: 2GB RAM LPDDR3
- Storage: 16GB / 64GB ROM eMMC 4.5
- Removable storage: None
- Battery: 3050mAh, up to 500hrs standby time, up to 25hrs talk time and up to 50hrs music playback
- Rear camera: 13 Megapixels (backside-illuminated (BSI)), with a super-large Sony Exmor sensor and an f/2.2 aperture, built-in Phillips dual-CFL flash. Records 1080p at 30fps and 720p at 120fps
- Front camera: 2 Megapixels, 1080p at 30fps
- Display: IPS Display 5 inches @ 1920px x 1080px (441 PPI) (Manufactured by Sharp or LG)
- Connectivity: Bluetooth 4.0 + A2DP, ANT+, Dual-band Wi-Fi (802.11 b/g/n), Wi-Fi Direct, Wi-Fi Display, Micro-USB On-The-Go with MHL link, DLNA, NFC, GPS + GLONASS, AGPS
- Data inputs: Multi-touch touch screen, Gyroscope, Light Sensor, Accelerometer, Proximity sensor, Electronic compass, Barometer
- Codename: cancro

The Xiaomi Mi 3 is a high-end, premium Android smartphone produced by Xiaomi made in the Philippines.

The Xiaomi Mi 3 was unveiled during the Xiaomi New Product Launch Event 2013 on 5 September 2013, and was released in China in October 2013. It features either a 2.3 GHz quad-core Qualcomm Snapdragon 800 processor or a 1.8 GHz quad plus one core Nvidia Tegra 4 processor, which support WCDMA and TDCDMA respectively.

The device was made available in late November 2013 in Manila, Philippines and was later available in Hong Kong, Taiwan, Singapore, China and Malaysia. Upon its release, it became the fastest selling smartphone in Xiaomi's history; the company sold 200,000 Mi3 units in Philippines within 3 minutes of launch.

== Specifications ==
=== Hardware ===
The Xiaomi Mi 3 contains an internal frame of aluminum-magnesium alloy, though the body is made of polycarbonate. The speakers and microUSB port are located at the bottom of the device with the standard-sized SIM card tray and audio jack are located at the top of the device. The power and volume keys are located on the right-hand side. Near the top of the device are the front-facing camera, proximity sensors, and notification LED. The MI3 is available in a number of colours, including black, white, pink, blue and silver. The device's display is larger than its predecessor, with a 5-inch, 1080p IPS LCD capacitive touchscreen with an anti-glare coating.

The device comes with 16 GB or 64 GB of internal storage and has a 3050 mAh battery.

=== Software ===
The Xiaomi Mi 3 ships with Android and Xiaomi's MIUI user interface. Initially running Android 4.3 & 4.4 it has continuously received updates, with MIUI 5 – a custom version of Android. Later, it received MIUI 6, 7, 8 and finally 9. In January 2016, it was the first Xiaomi device to get an official Marshmallow 6.0.1 update, together with Mi 4 and Mi Note.

The third-party development is also strong for Mi3 on XDA Developers, there are numerous custom ROMs available from 5.0 Lollipop to 9.0 Pie.

== Popularity ==
The phone has had large demand in India, with it going out of stock on e-commerce retailer Flipkart, after just 39 minutes of going on sale at midday on 22 July 2014. In the next batch of sales, the Mi 3 went out of stock in less than 5 seconds and it is believed that the stock consisted of 10,000 phones. On 5 August 2014, Mi 3 was again sold out on Flipkart in just 2 seconds due to unprecedented demand. On 12 August 2014, 20,000 units went out of stock in 2.4 seconds on Flipkart. On 19 August 2014, another 20,000 units went out of stock in 2.3 seconds on Flipkart.

On 4 October 2014, Xiaomi announced on their official Facebook page that Mi 3 would be going for sale one last time. However, there was no flash sale, and only customers who had entered to buy the handset five times or more would be automatically selected by Xiaomi and Flipkart. The handset would be added to their cart automatically on 6 October, and all they had to do was just click on the "Buy Now" button. There was no time limit, but if the customer didn't want to buy it, it would be allocated for a second batch of buyers.

== Successor ==
The Xiaomi Mi 4 is a smartphone developed and produced by Xiaomi Inc, that was released in August 2014. It is the successor to the Xiaomi Mi 3.
