= Xiaomi Mi Note 3 =

Android-based smartphone manufactured by Xiaomi Inc.

- Brand: Xiaomi
- Manufacturer: Xiaomi
- Type: Phablet
- Series: Mi Note
- First released: 11 September 2017; 8 years ago
- Predecessor: Xiaomi Mi Note 2
- Successor: Xiaomi Mi Note 10
- Related: Redmi 12; POCO C50
- Compatible networks: GSM, 3G, 4G (LTE)
- Form factor: Monoblock
- Dimensions: 152.6×74×7.6 mm (6.01×2.91×0.30 in)
- Weight: 163 g (5.7 oz)
- Operating system: Initial: Chinese: Android 7.1.2 Nougat + MIUI 8 Global: Android 7.1.2 Nougat + MIUI 9 Current: Android 9 Pie + MIUI 12
- CPU: Qualcomm SDM660 Snapdragon 660, 8 cores (4×2.2 GHz Kryo 260 Gold & 4×1.8 GHz Kryo 260 Silver)
- GPU: Adreno 512
- Memory: 6 GB, LPDDR4X
- Storage: 64/128 GB eMMC 5.1
- Battery: Non-removable, Li-Ion 3500 mAh
- Charging: Fast charging at 18 W Quick Charge 3.0
- Rear camera: 12 Mp Sony IMX386, f/1.8, 27 mm (wide-angle), 1.23 μm, PDAF, ISO 100 - 3200 + 12 Mp Samsung S5K3M3, f/2.6, 52 mm (telephoto), 1/3.4", 1.0 μm, 2x optical zoom 2-LED flash, panorama, HDR; Video: 4K@30fps, 1080p@30fps, 720p@30fps, 720p120fps
- Front camera: 16 Mp Samsung S5K3P3, f/2.0, 26 mm (wide-angle), 1.00 μm, AF; Video: 1080p@ 30fps, 720p@30fps
- Display: 6.71 in (170 mm); 720 × 1650 px resolution (~268 ppi density)
- Connectivity: USB-C 2.0, Bluetooth 5.0 (A2DP, LE), NFC, IR port, Wi-Fi 802.11 a/b/g/n/ac (dual-band, Wi-Fi Direct, hotspot), GPS, A -GPS, GLONASS, BDS
- SAR: Head 0.50 W/kg; Body 1.54 W/kg
- Other: Fingerprint scanner (embedded in the home button), proximity sensor, accelerometer, gyroscope, compass, Hall sensor, barometer

Xiaomi Mi Note 3 is a smartphone of the company Xiaomi, which is part of the Mi Note series. It was presented on September 11, 2017, together with the smartphone Xiaomi Mi MIX 2. Starting with this smartphone, the Mi Note series has become a sub-flagship.

== Design ==
The back panel is made of glass. The screen is made of Corning glass Gorilla Glass 4. The side part of the smartphone is made of aluminum 7000 series.

From the outside, the smartphone is very similar to the Xiaomi Mi 6.

The smartphone, unlike its predecessor, got rid of the 3.5 mm audio jack.

At the bottom there is a USB-C connector, a speaker and a microphone stylized as a speaker. On top are the second microphone and IR port. On the left side there is a slot for 2 SIM-cards. On the right side are the volume buttons and the smartphone lock button. The fingerprint scanner is built into the home button.

In Ukraine, Xiaomi Mi Note 3 was sold in black and blue colors.

== Specifications ==
=== Platform ===
The smartphone received a Qualcomm Snapdragon 660 processor and an Adreno 540 graphics processor.

=== Battery ===
The battery received a volume of 3500 mAh and support for fast 18-watt Quick Charge 3.0 charging.

=== Camera ===
The smartphone received a main dual camera of 12 Mp, f/1.8 + 12 Mp, f2.6 with phase autofocus, 4-axis optical stabilization and the ability to record video in 4K@30fps resolution. The front camera received a resolution of 16 MP, aperture f/2.2 and the ability to record video in 1080p@30fps resolution. It is also the first Xiaomi smartphone to receive the face unlock function using the front camera.

=== Screen ===
Screen IPS LCD, 5.5", FullHD (1920 × 1080) with an aspect ratio of 16:9 and a pixel density of 403 ppi.

=== Memory ===
It was sold in 6/64 and 6/128 GB configurations.

=== Software ===
The Chinese version was released on MIUI 8, and the global version was released on MIUI 9, based on Android 7.1.2 Nougat. Was updated to MIUI 12 based on Android 9 Pie.

== Reviews ==
The reviewer from the Internet portal ITC.ua gave the smartphone 4 points out of 5. Among the negatives, he attributed the slippery case, the rawness of the software that can be seen in the camera application, and the high price tag at the start of sales. The reviewer considered the build quality, display, performance, autonomy and operation of the fingerprint scanner to be positive. In conclusion, he said that the smartphone was very similar to the Xiaomi Mi 6 and at the same time managed to keep most of the advantages of the older model and got a cheaper price.
