= Xiaomi Mi 1S =

2012 Android smartphone by Xiaomi

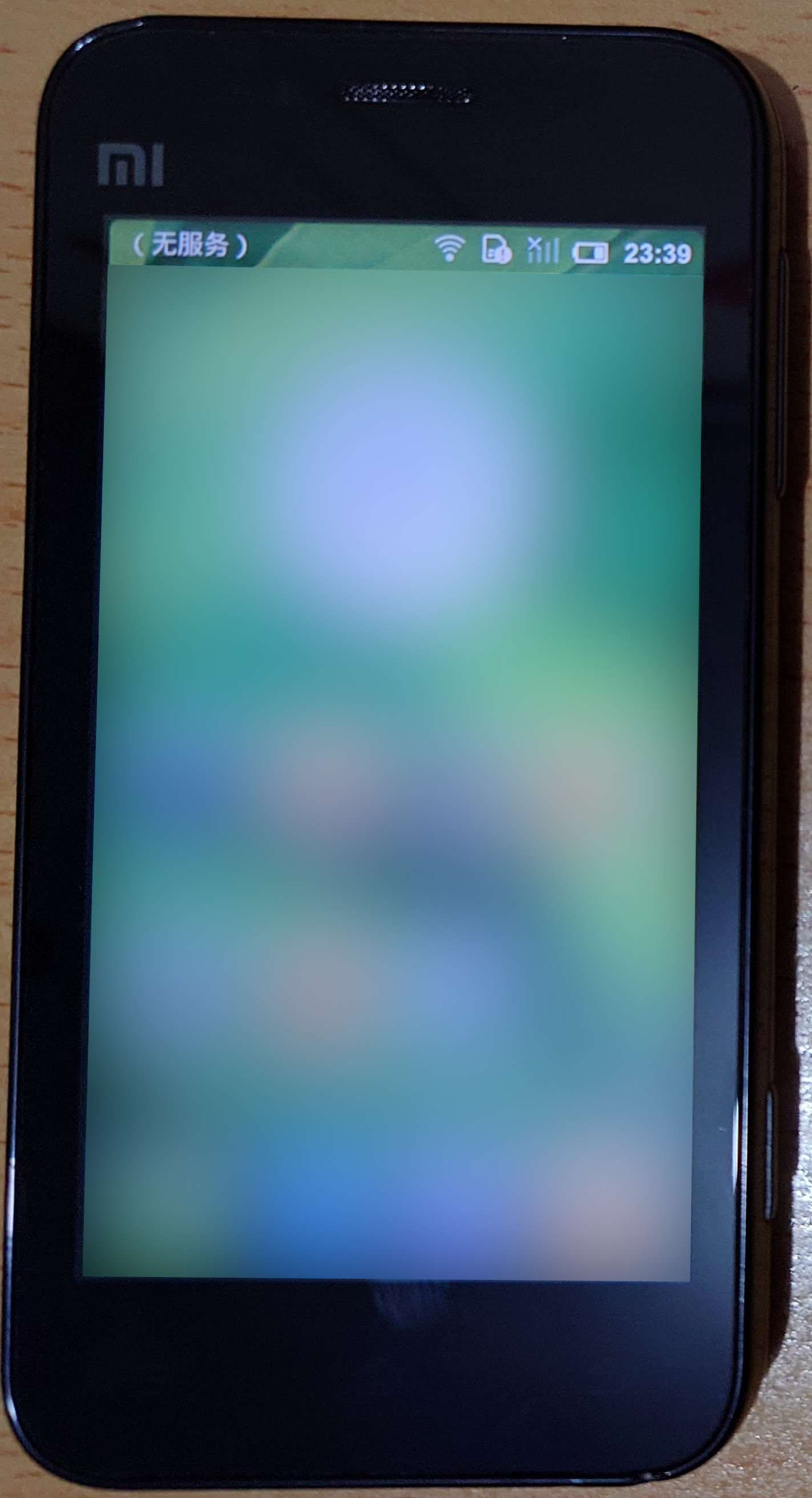
- Also known as: Xiaomi Mi1S, Xiaomi Mi 1 Plus, Xiaomi Mi One Plus
- Manufacturer: Xiaomi
- Type: Smartphone
- Series: Mi
- First released: August 2012; 13 years ago
- Successor: Xiaomi Mi 2S
- Related: Xiaomi Mi 1 Xiaomi Mi 1 Youth Edition; Xiaomi Mi 1S Youth Edition
- Compatible networks: GSM 850 / 900 / 1800 / 1900; HSDPA 850 / 1900 / 2100
- Form factor: Slate
- Dimensions: 125.0×63.0×11.9 mm (4.92×2.48×0.47 in)
- Weight: 149 g (5 oz)
- Operating system: Original: Android 2.3.6 Gingerbread with MIUI V2; Current: Android 4.1.2 Jelly Bean with MIUI V5
- CPU: Qualcomm MSM8660 Snapdragon S3 (45 nm), 2×1.7 GHz Scorpion
- GPU: Adreno 220
- Memory: 1 GB LPDDR2
- Storage: 4 GB eMMC 2.0
- Removable storage: microSDHC up to 32 GB
- Battery: Removable, Li-Ion 1930 mAh
- Charging: 5 W
- Rear camera: 8 MP f/2.2, 28 mm (wide-angle), AF; 1-LED flash, HDR; Video: 1080p@30fps, 720p@30fps
- Front camera: 2 MP (wide-angle); Video: 720p@30fps
- Display: TFT LCD, 4.0", 854 × 480, 16:9, 245 ppi
- Connectivity: microUSB 2.0, 3.5 mm Audio, Bluetooth 2.1 (A2DP), Wi-Fi 802.11 b/g/n (hotspot), GPS, A-GPS
- Codename: mioneplus
- Other: Proximity sensor, accelerometer, compass

The Xiaomi Mi 1S is an Android smartphone developed by Xiaomi, which is an improved version of the Xiaomi Mi 1 smartphone. It was introduced in August 2012.

== Design ==
The screen is made of glass, and the body is made of plastic.

Externally, the smartphone is similar to Xiaomi Mi 1.

At the bottom there is a microUSB connector and a microphone. At the top there is a 3.5 mm audio jack and a smartphone lock button. On the right side there are volume buttons and a camera launch button. The speaker and the second microphone are located on the back panel, which can be removed. Slots for SIM cards and a MicroSD memory card up to 32 GB are located under the body.

The Xiaomi Mi 1S was sold in seven colors: Gray, White, Red, Blue, Green, Purple and Orange. Also, the back panel could be changed to a panel of a different color.

== Technical specifications ==
=== Processor ===
The smartphone received a Qualcomm MSM8660 Snapdragon S3 processor (2 × 1.7 GHz Scorpion) and a Adreno 220 graphics processor.

=== Battery ===
The battery received a capacity of 1930 mAh. It is also possible to replace it.

=== Camera ===
The smartphone received an 8 MP main camera, f/2.2 with autofocus and the ability to record video with a resolution of 1080p@30fps. The front camera received a resolution of 2 MP and the ability to record video in 720p@30fps.

=== Display ===
The display has a TFT LCD screen, 4.0", 854 × 480, with an aspect ratio of 16:9 and a pixel density of 245 ppi.

=== Storage ===
The smartphone was sold in a 1/4 GB configuration.

=== Software ===
Mi 1S was released on MIUI V2, which was based on Android 2.3.6 Gingerbread. It was updated to MIUI V5 based on Android 4.1.2 Jelly Bean.

== See also ==
- Xiaomi
- MIUI
