= Xiaomi Mi 2A =

Smartphones manufactured by Xiaomi

- Manufacturer: Xiaomi
- Type: Smartphone
- Series: Mi
- Availability by region: China 9 April 2013
- Predecessor: Xiaomi Mi 1 Youth
- Successor: Xiaomi Mi 4i
- Related: Xiaomi Mi 2 Xiaomi Mi 2S
- Compatible networks: GSM 850, 900, 1800, and 1900 MHz & WCDMA 850, 1900 and 2100MHz
- Form factor: Slate
- Dimensions: 133 mm (5.2 in) H 66.5 mm (2.62 in) W 9.5 mm (0.37 in) D
- Operating system: MIUI v5 (Android 4.1 Jelly Bean)
- CPU: Qualcomm Snapdragon S4 MSM8960T (without LTE) Dual-Core Krait 300 @ 1.70GHz
- GPU: Adreno 320
- Memory: 1 GB RAM
- Storage: 16 GB
- Removable storage: None
- Battery: 2030mAh
- Rear camera: 8 Megapixels (backside-illuminated (BSI)), Records 1080p at 30fps and 720p at 90fps, Raw image output (with external Mi2raw app)
- Front camera: 2 Megapixels, 1080p at 30fps
- Display: IPS Display 4.5inches @ 1280px x 720px (326 PPI) (Manufactured by Sharp Inc.)
- Connectivity: List: Bluetooth 4.0 + A2DP; Wi-Fi (802.11 b/g/n); Wi-Fi Direct; Micro-USB On-The-Go with MHL link; DLNA
- Data inputs: Capacitive touch screen
- Website: mi.com/mi2a

Xiaomi Mi 2A (often referred to as Xiaomi Phone 2A, Chinese: 小米手机2A), is a high-end, Android smartphone produced by Xiaomi. The device features a dual-core 1.7 GHz Qualcomm Snapdragon S4 Pro as its CPU. The device was initially sold in China for ¥1499.

== Specifications ==
=== Hardware ===
The casing of the Xiaomi Mi 2A is mostly made from plastic, with SIM card slots located inside. The microUSB port is located at the bottom of the device with the audio jack located at the top of the device. The power and volume keys were located on the right side of device. Near the top of the device are a front-facing camera, proximity sensors, and a notification LED. In particular, the proximity sensors are mostly used to detect whether the device is in a pocket or not. The device is widely available in white, green, yellow, blue, red and pink color finishes. The device's display is larger than its predecessor, with a 4.5-inch, 720p IPS LCD capacitive touchscreen with a resolution of 326ppi, and Dragontrail glass.

The model is one of two variations of the Xiaomi Mi 2 Xiaomi created before creating the Xiaomi Mi 3. The device comes with 16GB of internal storage and a 2030mAh, NFC-enabled battery.

=== Software ===
The Xiaomi Mi2A ships with Android and Xiaomi's MIUI user experience.

==== Updates ====
Updates for the Xiaomi Mi 2A is available in three channels: stable, developer and daily. New stable builds are usually available every month with major changes between each update, new developer builds are usually available every week with small but sometimes significant features added between each update and new beta builds are usually available every Wednesdays and usually only contain small fixes and optimizations. Beta builds are only available to some beta testers selected on MIUI's community forums. To update between versions, users usually use an over-the-air updater application.

== See also ==
- Xiaomi
- MIUI

Preceded by Xiaomi Mi 2	Xiaomi Mi 2A; 2013	Succeeded by Xiaomi Mi 2S
