= Xiaomi Mi Note 2 =

Smartphone

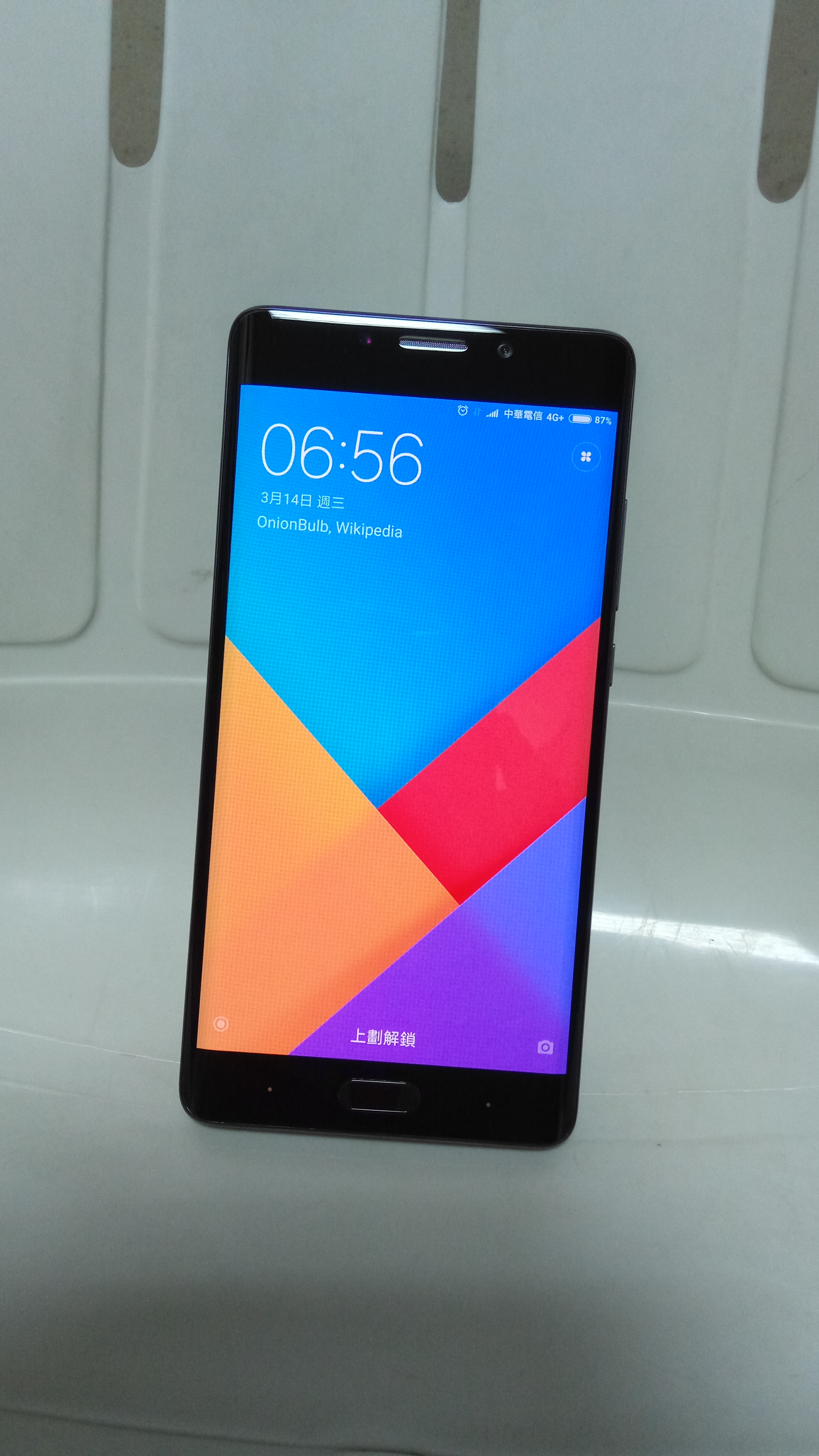
- Manufacturer: Xiaomi
- Type: Smartphone
- Series: Mi Note
- Predecessor: Xiaomi Mi Note
- Successor: Xiaomi Mi Note 3
- Compatible networks: 2G: GSM, 3G: HSDPA, 4G: LTE
- Form factor: Slate phone
- Dimensions: 156.2×77.3×7.6 mm (6.15×3.04×0.30 in)
- Weight: 166 g (6 oz)
- Operating system: MIUI 8 (Android 6.0); Upgradeable to MIUI 11 (Android 8.0)
- System-on-chip: Qualcomm Snapdragon 821
- CPU: Dual-core 2.35GHz Kryo + Dual-core 1.6GHz Kryo
- GPU: Adreno 530
- Memory: 6 GB/4 GB RAM
- Storage: 128 GB/64 GB
- Battery: Non-removable Li-Po 4070 mAH battery
- Rear camera: 22.5 MP
- Front camera: 8.1 MP
- Display: OLED 5.7" 1080*1920 pixels, 16M colors
- Connectivity: Wi-Fi 802.11 a/b/g/n/ac, dual-band, Wi-Fi Direct, hotspot Bluetooth 4.2, A2DP, LE
- Codename: scorpio
- Website: www.mi.com/en/minote2/

The Xiaomi Mi Note2 (Chinese: 小米Note 2) is a smartphone developed by Xiaomi Inc. It is part of Xiaomi's high-end big format smartphone line, the Mi Note Series and was released in November 2016.

== Specifications ==
| Operating System | MIUI 8 based on Android 6.0.1 Marshmallow Upgradeable to MIUI 11 based on Android 8.0 Oreo | | |
| Display | 5.7-inch 1080p (386ppi) Curved LG OLED panel | | |
| SoC | Quad-core Qualcomm Snapdragon 821 Two Kryo cores at 2.35GHz, two Kryo cores at 2.15GHz 14nm technology | | |
| GPU | Adreno 530 | | |
| RAM | 4GB | 6GB | 6GB |
| Storage | 64GB | 64GB | 128GB |
| Rear camera | 22.5MP with f/2.0 lens dual-tone LED flash 4K video recording | | |
| Front shooter | 8MP with f/2.0 lens 1080p video recording | | |
| Connectivity | 4G+, Wi-Fi a/b/g/n/ac, Bluetooth 4.2 (A2DP), NFC, IR blaster GPS, GLONASS, BeiDou; USB-C, 3.5mm audio jack | | |
| Battery | 4070mAh battery Quick Charge 3.0 | | |
| Fingerprint | Front fingerprint sensor | | |
| Dimensions | 156.2 x 77.3 x 7.6mm | | |
| Weight | 166g | | |
| Colors | Black, Black-Silver, Silver | | |
