= Xiaomi Mi 2 =

Android smartphone from Xiaomi Tech

- Also known as: Xiaomi Mi2, Xiaomi Phone 2
- Manufacturer: Xiaomi
- Type: Smartphone
- Series: Mi
- Availability by region: China October 2012
- Predecessor: Xiaomi Mi 1 Xiaomi Mi 1S
- Successor: Xiaomi Mi 3
- Related: Xiaomi Mi 2A; Xiaomi Mi 2S
- Compatible networks: GSM 850,900,1800, and 1900MHz & WCDMA 850, 1900 and 2100MHz
- Form factor: Slate
- Dimensions: 125 mm (4.9 in) H 62 mm (2.4 in) W 10.2 mm (0.40 in) D
- Weight: 145 g (5.1 oz)
- Operating system: Original: MIUI V4 (Android 4.1 Jelly Bean) Current: MIUI 9 (Android 5.0.1 Lollipop)
- CPU: Qualcomm Snapdragon S4 APQ8064 Quad-Core Krait @ 1.5 GHz
- GPU: Adreno 320
- Memory: 2GB RAM
- Storage: 16GB / 32GB ROM
- Removable storage: None
- Battery: 1930mAh, 3100mAh (optional)
- Rear camera: 8 Megapixels (backside-illuminated (BSI)), Records 1080p at 30fps and 720p at 90fps
- Front camera: 2 Megapixels, 1080p at 30fps
- Display: IPS Display 4.3inches @ 1280px x 720px (341 PPI) (Manufactured by Sharp Inc.)
- Connectivity: List: Bluetooth 4.0 + A2DP; Wi-Fi (802.11 b/g/n); Wi-Fi Direct; Micro-USB On-The-Go with MHL link; DLNA
- Data inputs: Capacitive touch screen
- Codename: aries

Xiaomi Mi 2 (often referred to as Xiaomi Phone 2, Chinese: 小米手机2), is an Android smartphone produced by Xiaomi. The device features a quad-core 1.5 GHz Qualcomm Snapdragon S4 Pro as its CPU. The device initially sold for ¥1999 in China.

== Specifications ==
=== Hardware ===
The casing of the Xiaomi Mi 2 is mostly made from plastic, with SIM card slots located inside. The microUSB port is located at the bottom of the device with the audio jack located at the top of the device. The power and volume keys were located on the right side of device. Near the top of the device are a front-facing camera, proximity sensors, and a notification LED. In particular, the proximity sensors are mostly used to detect whether the device is in a pocket or not. The device is widely available in white, green, yellow, blue, red and pink color finishes. The device's display is larger than its predecessor, with a 4.3-inch, 720p IPS LCD capacitive touchscreen with a resolution of ~342 ppi, and Dragontrail glass.

The model is one of three variations of the device Xiaomi created before creating the Xiaomi Mi 3. The device comes with either 16 GB or 32 GB of internal storage. It contains a 2000 mAh battery.

=== Software ===
The Xiaomi Mi 2 ships with Android and Xiaomi's MIUI user experience.

==== Updates ====
Updates for the Xiaomi Mi 2 is available in three channels: stable, developer and daily. New stable builds are usually available every month with major changes between each update, new developer builds are usually available every week with small but sometimes significant features added between each update and new beta builds are usually available every Wednesdays and usually only contain small fixes and optimizations. Beta builds are only available to some beta testers selected on MIUI's community forums. To update between versions, users usually use an over-the-air updater application.

The Xiaomi Mi was updated to MIUI 9 based on Android 5.0.1 Lollipop.

== See also ==
- Xiaomi
- MIUI
