= Xiaomi Mi 4i =

Smartphone

- The front face of the Mi 4i with LineageOS installed
- Also known as: Mi4i
- Manufacturer: Xiaomi Inc.
- Type: Smartphone
- Series: Mi
- First released: April 2015; 11 years ago
- Availability by region: April 2015 (India)
- Units sold: 40,000
- Units shipped: N/A
- Predecessor: Xiaomi Mi 2A
- Successor: Xiaomi Mi 5X
- Related: Xiaomi Mi 4 Xiaomi Mi 4c Xiaomi Mi 4S
- Compatible networks: GSM, CDMA, 3G, EVDO, HSDPA, LTE
- Form factor: Slate
- Dimensions: 138.1 mm (5.44 in) H 69.6 mm (2.74 in) W 7.8 mm (0.31 in) D
- Weight: 130 g (4.59 oz)
- Operating system: Original: MIUI 6 (Android 5.0 Lollipop); Current: MIUI 9 (Android 7.1 Nougat)
- System-on-chip: Qualcomm Snapdragon 615 MSM8939 (2nd gen)
- CPU: Quad-core 1.7 GHz + Quad-core 1.1 GHz Cortex-A53
- GPU: Adreno 405
- Memory: 2 GB RAM
- Storage: 16, 32 GB
- Removable storage: Not Supported. USB OTG Supported
- Battery: 3120 mAh
- Rear camera: 13 MP back-side illuminated sensor by Sony exmor RS IMX214 or Samsung ISOCELL S5K3M2, HD video (1080p) at 30 frame/s, IR filter, dual warm/cool Dual Tone LED flashes, aperture f/2.0, facial recognition, image stabilization burst mode
- Front camera: 5 MP, HD video (1080p)aperture f/1.8
- Display: 5 in (130 mm) diagonal (16:9 aspect ratio), multi-touch display, IPS Fully laminated Corning Concore glass, FHD (1080x1920 pixels at 441 ppi
- Sound: Mono sound
- Connectivity: Wi-Fi
- Data inputs: Multi-touch touchscreen display, microphone, gyroscope, accelerometer, digital compass, proximity sensor, ambient light sensor
- Model: 2015015
- Website: www.mi.com/in/mi4i/

The Xiaomi Mi 4i (Chinese: 小米手机4i) is a smartphone developed by Xiaomi Inc. It is part of Xiaomi's mid-range smartphone line, and was released in April 2015. Xiaomi held a media event in Siri Fort Auditorium, Delhi to formally introduce the mid-range phone, and also supplied its fans with their complementary smart-accessory, the Xiaomi MiBand, during the Xiaomi New Product Launch Event 2015 on April 23, 2015.

The Mi4i is a slightly bumped down version of its predecessor, the Xiaomi Mi4. The phone has a different design than its predecessor and has a polycarbonate body. It was also released with the new MIUI 6 (introduced in August 2014) based on Android Lollipop.

Reception towards the device was generally positive, though there were still a high amount of negative feedback from users of Apple's iPhone 5C due to its similar design and quality. Some media companies hailed it to be one of the best smartphones available in the market due to its high-end hardware which is sold for comparably lower price than its competitors.

== History ==
Before its official unveiling, media speculation primarily focused on leaks; including photos that announced the Mi4i. While the device was announced on April 23, it didn't become available until April 30, running MIUI 6 (Android Lollipop).

Xiaomi launched the Mi 4i specifically in India first and plans to expand sales throughout Asia.

== Features ==
=== Operating system and software ===
The Xiaomi Mi 4i ships with MIUI V7 and can be upgraded to MIUI V8, Xiaomi's variant of the Android operating system. The user interface of MIUI is based on the concept of direct manipulation, using multi-touch gestures. Interface control elements consist of sliders, switches, and buttons. Interaction with the OS includes gestures such as swipe, tap, pinch and reverse pinch, all of which have specific definitions within the context of the Android operating system and its multi-touch interface. Internal accelerometers are used by some applications to respond to the movement of the device such as rotating it vertically (one common result is switching from portrait to landscape mode). The device includes an updater application which allows it to update its OS to the latest version of MIUI available for it.

=== Design ===
The device has a 5 in (12.7 cm) Sharp/JDI Corning OGS fully laminated touchscreen, with a screen resolution of 1080x1920 at a pixel density of 441 ppi. Home button of the smartphone is similar to its predecessor and is mainly touch-based with adjustable haptic feedback. It is available in different colors including Dark Gray, Yellow, Black, White, Blue and Pink.

=== Hardware ===
The Xiaomi Mi 4i is powered by a Qualcomm Snapdragon 615 (MSM8939) chipset which makes it a fast enough Android smartphone according to the AnTuTu benchmark application. Its processor is an Octa-core 1.7 GHz and 1.1 GHz and its graphics card is an Adreno 405. The phone includes a 3120 mAh battery which is rated to provide 300 hours of standby time. It comes with a 13 megapixel primary camera and a 5 megapixel secondary camera.
