= Matthew S. Rosen =

Matthew Rosen
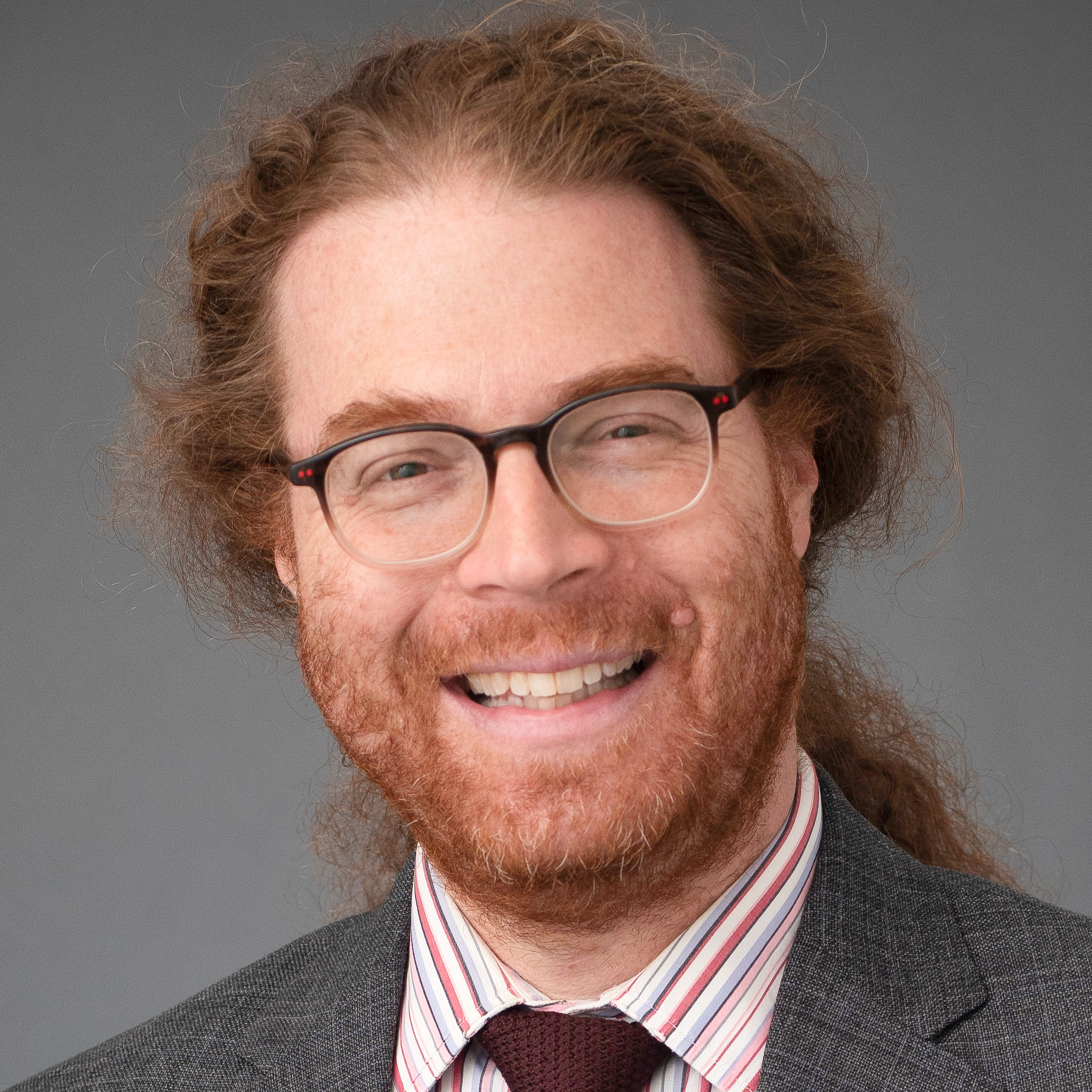
- Education: Rensselaer Polytechnic Institute (BS, Physics), The University of Michigan, Ann Arbor (PhD, Physics)
- Known for: Ultra-low field MRI Hyperpolarization Deep Learning for image reconstruction
- Awards: Fellow, American Physical Society (2021) Distinguished Investigator, Academy for Radiology & Biomedical Imaging Research (2023) Fellow, International Society for Magnetic Resonance in Medicine (2024)
- Scientific career
- Fields: Physics (Atomic physics), magnetic resonance, Deep learning, optimal control
- Workplaces: Harvard University Center for Astrophysics (2001-2009) MGH/Martinos Center/Harvard Medical School (2009-)
- Thesis: (2001)
- Doctoral advisor: Scott D. Swanson (Radiology) Timothy Chupp (Physics)

Matthew S. Rosen is an American physicist and professor.

After graduating from The Knox School in St. James, New York, in 1988, Rosen completed a bachelor's degree in physics at Rensselaer Polytechnic Institute, followed by a doctorate in the same subject at the University of Michigan.

Rosen was elected a Fellow of the American Physical Society in 2021, for his research on "medical imaging through the development and commercialization of low field human MRI scanners, for the development of automated transform by manifold approximation (AUTOMAP), a general AI-based image reconstruction framework, and for unique spin hyperpolarization techniques." In 2023, he was named Distinguished Investigator by the Academy for Radiology & Biomedical Imaging Research.

Rosen was elected a Fellow of the International Society for Magnetic Resonance in Medicine in 2024 for "outstanding efforts in low-field MRI and development of novel AI-based reconstruction methods leading to the commercialization of novel MRI technologies."

He is a faculty member at the Athinoula A. Martinos Center for Biomedical Imaging and an Associate Professor at Harvard Medical School. He is the Kiyomi and Ed Baird MGH Research Scholar. In 2021, he gave the Paul Callaghan prize lecture at ISMAR. He was the Co-Chair of the 65th Experimental NMR Conference (ENC) in 2024.

In 2014, Rosen, Dr. Jonathan Rothberg, and Professor Ronald Walsworth founded Hyperfine to develop the world's first portable MRI scanner.
