= Ronald Walsworth =

American physicist, engineer and professor

- Education: Duke University (B.S.), Harvard University (Ph.D.)
- Known for: Quantum sensing
- Awards: Francis M. Pipkin Award (2005)
- Scientific career
- Fields: Physics (atomic physics)
- Workplaces: Harvard University (1991–2019); University of Maryland (2019–)
- Doctoral advisor: Isaac Silvera

Ronald Walsworth is an American physicist, engineer, and professor at the University of Maryland.

== Career ==
Walsworth earned a B.S. in physics from Duke University in 1984 and completed a Ph.D. in physics from Harvard in 1991. He has been recognized for his contributions to science. In 2001, he was elected a Fellow of the American Physical Society. He was a Distinguished Traveling Lecturer for the American Physical Society from 2002 to 2023. In 2005, he received the Francis M. Pipkin Award in Precision Measurements from the American Physical Society. He also received the Smithsonian Institution Exceptional Service Award; the Duke University Faculty Scholar Award; and the NASA Group Achievement Award.

Since 2020, Walsworth has served as the Founding Director of the Quantum Technology Center at the University of Maryland; and also as a Minta Martin Professor in the Department of Physics and in the Department of Electrical & Computer Engineering at the University of Maryland. He previously served as a Senior Physicist at the Smithsonian Astrophysical Observatory and as a Senior Lecturer in the Department of Physics at Harvard University.

Walsworth has helped establish several startup companies. In 2012, he co-founded Quantum Diamond Technologies with Mikhail Lukin and others to develop biomedical diagnostic technology using nitrogen-vacancy diamond magnetic imaging. In 2014, he co-founded Hyperfine with Matthew Rosen and Jonathan Rothberg to develop the world's first portable human MRI instrument able to move to a patient's bedside at the point of care. In 2020, he founded Quantum Catalyzer to perform quantum research and create new quantum technology startups; one of these companies is QDM.IO, co-founded by Walsworth and geologist Roger Fu, which builds and sells quantum diamond microscopes (QDMs) for research and education.

In 2024, Walsworth joined Quantum Coast Capital as an advisor, leveraging his extensive expertise in quantum science and technology to guide the venture capital firm in identifying and nurturing innovative startups in the quantum ecosystem. His role involves shaping strategies for investment in quantum technologies and fostering collaborations between research institutions and industry to accelerate advancements in the field.
