= Jonathan Rothberg =

American scientist and entrepreneur (born 1963)

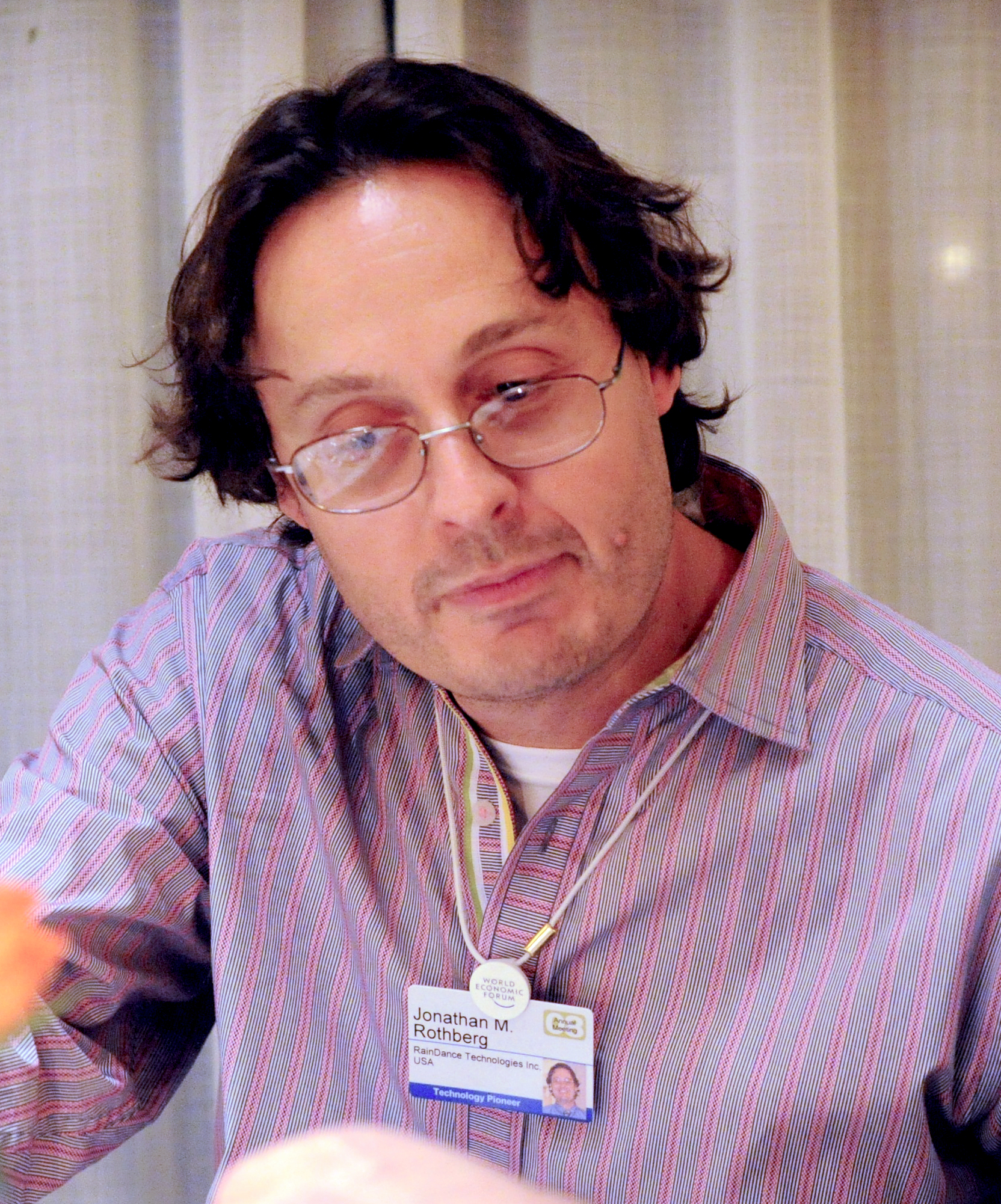
- Rothberg in 2008
- Born: April 28, 1963 (age 63); New Haven, Connecticut
- Education: Carnegie Mellon University; Yale University
- Awards: National Medal of Technology and Innovation (2016)
- Scientific career
- Fields: Next-generation sequencing, medical imaging, pharmaceuticals, medical devices
- Workplaces: 454 Life Sciences, Ion Torrent, RainDance Technologies

Jonathan Marc Rothberg (born April 28, 1963) is an American scientist and entrepreneur notable for his contributions to DNA sequencing. He resides in Miami, Florida.

== Early life ==
Rothberg was born in New Haven, Connecticut, to Lillian Rothberg and Henry Rothberg, a chemical engineer. Prior to Rothberg's birth, his parents founded Laticrete International, Inc. a family-owned manufacturer of products for the installation of tile and stone. As a child Jonathan went on sales calls with his father. Rothberg's family laid the foundation for his scientific career.

== Education and scientific career ==
Rothberg earned a BS in chemical engineering with an option in biomedical engineering from Carnegie Mellon University in 1985. He then went on to earn an MS, MPhil, and PhD in biology from Yale University.

Rothberg himself holds more than 100 patents.

== Business career ==
=== CuraGen ===
While a graduate student at Yale, he founded CuraGen, one of the first genomics companies in 1991. CuraGen became a public company via an initial public offering in 1999. By the next year it had a market cap of $5 billion, bigger than that of American Airlines. Rothberg resigned as chief executive of CuraGen in 2005.

=== 454 Life Sciences ===
In 2000, 454 Life Sciences was founded as a subsidiary of CuraGen; Rothberg was the CEO of CuraGen at the time. The idea for 454 Life Sciences came when Noah, his second child, was born in 1999, and had to be sent to the neonatal intensive care unit because of breathing troubles. Noah turned out to be fine, but Rothberg was frustrated that doctors did not have a rapid test to ensure his son did not have an inherited disease. Rothberg brought to market a machine for massively parallel DNA sequencing. 454 Life Sciences and the Baylor College of Medicine Genome Center were the first to complete and make public the sequence of an individual human genome (James D. Watson). Published in Nature magazine, that genome was made publicly on GenBank and browsable via the efforts of Lincoln Stein's group contributing to personal genomics. Rothberg lost control of 454 Life Sciences by 2007. The company was acquired by Roche Diagnostics in 2007 for $140 million then closed down by Roche in 2013 after other approaches to sequencing rendered the underlying technology noncompetitive.

In 2004, Rothberg founded RainDance Technologies, which used droplet-based microfluidics. RainDance was acquired in 2017 by Bio-Rad Laboratories, Inc.

=== Ion Torrent ===
Rothberg founded Ion Torrent in 2007, which developed ion semiconductor sequencing, a technology utilized by their Personal Genome Machine (PGM) DNA sequencer. He founded the company with an undisclosed amount of his own money and later took in $23 million in venture capital. After experiences at CuraGen and 454 Life Sciences, he made sure to retain supervoting share majority so he could not be forced out. At the time, the PGM device was the smallest and cheapest DNA decoder to hit the market. It was able to read 10 million base pairs of DNA in two hours, and sold for $50,000. In 2010, Ion Torrent was acquired for $375 million in cash and stock upfront, plus as much as $350 million later if sales were to reach certain levels.

=== 4Catalyzer ===
Rothberg established a startup accelerator called 4Catalyzer in Guilford, CT, in the early 2010s. The companies focus on using inflection points in medicine, such as deep learning, next-generation sequencing, and the silicon supply chain, to address global healthcare challenges. 4Catalyzer companies include Butterfly Network, Quantum-Si, Hyperfine, Tesseract Health, Liminal Sciences, Detect, AI Therapeutics, and Protein Evolution, Inc.

=== Butterfly Network ===
In 2011, Rothberg founded Butterfly Network after seeing a talk by MIT physicist Max Tegmark, who was becoming fascinated by artificial intelligence. Rothberg brought in one of Tegmark's smartest students, Nevada Sanchez, a Hertz Fellow and co-founder of the company who was named among Forbes 30 Under 30 in 2015. Butterfly Network sells a hand-held ultrasound imaging device that connects to an iPhone, called the iQ. The core technology is a silicon chip, contrasting with other ultrasound devices that use piezoelectric crystals. The use of silicon makes the device far cheaper to manufacture. The iQ received 13 different device clearances from the Food and Drug Administration. The iQ sells for just over $2,000, and is now commercially available. In September, 2018, Butterfly Network raised $250 million from investors Fidelity, the Gates Foundation, and Fosun Pharma at an estimated $1.25 billion valuation. In February 2021 Butterfly Network was publicly listed on the NYSE under the ticker $BFLY.

=== Quantum-Si ===
Rothberg founded Quantum-Si in 2013 with the mission of transforming single molecule analysis and democratizing its use by providing researchers and clinicians access to the proteome, the set of proteins expressed within a cell. In 2021 Quantum-Si went public on the NASDAQ under the ticker $QSI.

In February 2022, Rothberg became interim CEO of Quantum-Si.

=== Hyperfine ===
In 2014, Rothberg, along with Ronald Walsworth, and Matthew Rosen founded Hyperfine to develop the world's first portable MRI scanner that can be transported easily between patients and costs a fraction of traditional MRI. Hyperfine received FDA clearance in 2021 to add deep-learning algorithms to boost the quality of images. The Hyperfine Swoop is commercially available and saving lives on multiple continents around the world, including limited resource settings in Africa and Asia where access to MRI was never before possible. Hyperfine went public in December 2021 and is listed on the NASDAQ under the ticker, $HYPR.

=== Detect ===
Rothberg launched Detect in partnership with consumer electronics veteran and now Detect CEO Hugo Barra at the outset of the Covid-19 pandemic with the goal of bringing pathogen testing into the home.

Detect’s first product is the FDA-authorized Detect Covid-19 Test, which they brought to market in 18 months from company founding. The customer reception and press coverage of the product has been overwhelmingly positive.

=== Identifeye Health ===
Identifeye Health (formerly Tesseract Health) was founded in 2018 to build technology at the nexus of radiology and laboratory medicine on the diagnostic tree. The company aims to support the screening, diagnosis, and monitoring of disease, both affordably and non-invasively using "the power of data in the human eye".

=== Liminal Sciences ===
Rothberg founded Liminal in 2018 with the goal of building a wearable brain monitor for acute and chronic conditions including stroke, traumatic brain injury, hydrocephalus, and epilepsy. Inspired by both the utility and the limitations of EEG (electroencephalogram), Liminal has invented AEG, a new modality that combines blood flow measurement with the existing technology that monitors the electrical activity of the brain. Liminal enables critical “brain vital signs” to make brain monitoring as ubiquitous as heart monitoring.

=== Protein Evolution, Inc. ===
Protein Evolution was founded in October of 2021 with the mission to help the chemicals and materials industries transition to a lower-carbon, more circular economy. Leveraging recent breakthroughs in synthetic biology and artificial intelligence, the company designs enzymes capable of breaking down end-of-life textile and plastic waste into the raw materials of new textile and plastic products. These raw materials are indistinguishable from the petroleum-derived alternatives used today for new plastic production, and thus the company sees immediate applications within the petrochemical industry, global consumer packaged goods companies, textile manufacturers and others that are looking to significantly reduce their reliance on fossil fuels.

In the middle of 2022, the company completed its first outside capitalize raise of approximately $25 million.

== Personal life ==
Rothberg and his wife Bonnie, a physician who also holds a Ph.D. in epidemiology from Yale, have five children, whom Rothberg often refers to in his speeches. In 2002, the couple started the nonprofit Rothberg Institute for Childhood Diseases which works on treatments for tuberous sclerosis, a rare disease that affects one of their children. The institute ran a distributed computing project called Community TSC until April 2009. The TSC project was based on technology known as the Drug Design and Optimization Lab (D2OL), which the institute sponsored through 2009, to use volunteers' personal computers to model interactions of drug candidates with their target molecules.

Rothberg sponsors the Rothberg Catalyzer Prize at four universities: Carnegie Mellon University, Yale University, Brown University, and University of Pennsylvania.

Rothberg had his own version of Stonehenge, which he calls the Circle of Life, built near his home in Guilford, CT, using 700 tons of granite imported from Norway. Interested in wine-making, he acquired Chamard Vineyards in nearby Clinton, CT. Rothberg owns a yacht called Gene Machine, which is equipped with a lab on board, and its support vessel, Gene Chaser.

== Recognition ==
Rothberg was awarded the National Medal of Technology and Innovation by President Barack Obama in 2016 for his “pioneering inventions and commercialization of next-generation DNA sequencing technologies, making access to genomic information easier, faster and more cost-effective for researchers around the world".

Rothberg received the Connecticut Medal of Technology in 2010. In 2012, Rothberg was awarded the Wilbur Cross Medal as a distinguished alumnus from Yale University. Rothberg made Fortune Magazine's 2001 list of the 40 richest Americans under 40. Rothberg was elected a member of the National Academy of Engineering in 2004 for the application of engineering principles to the mining of genomic information for the discovery and development of new drugs. In 2018, he received the Award for Excellence in Molecular Diagnostics from the Association for Molecular Pathology.
