= Xiaomi Mi Note =

Smartphone series by Xiaomi

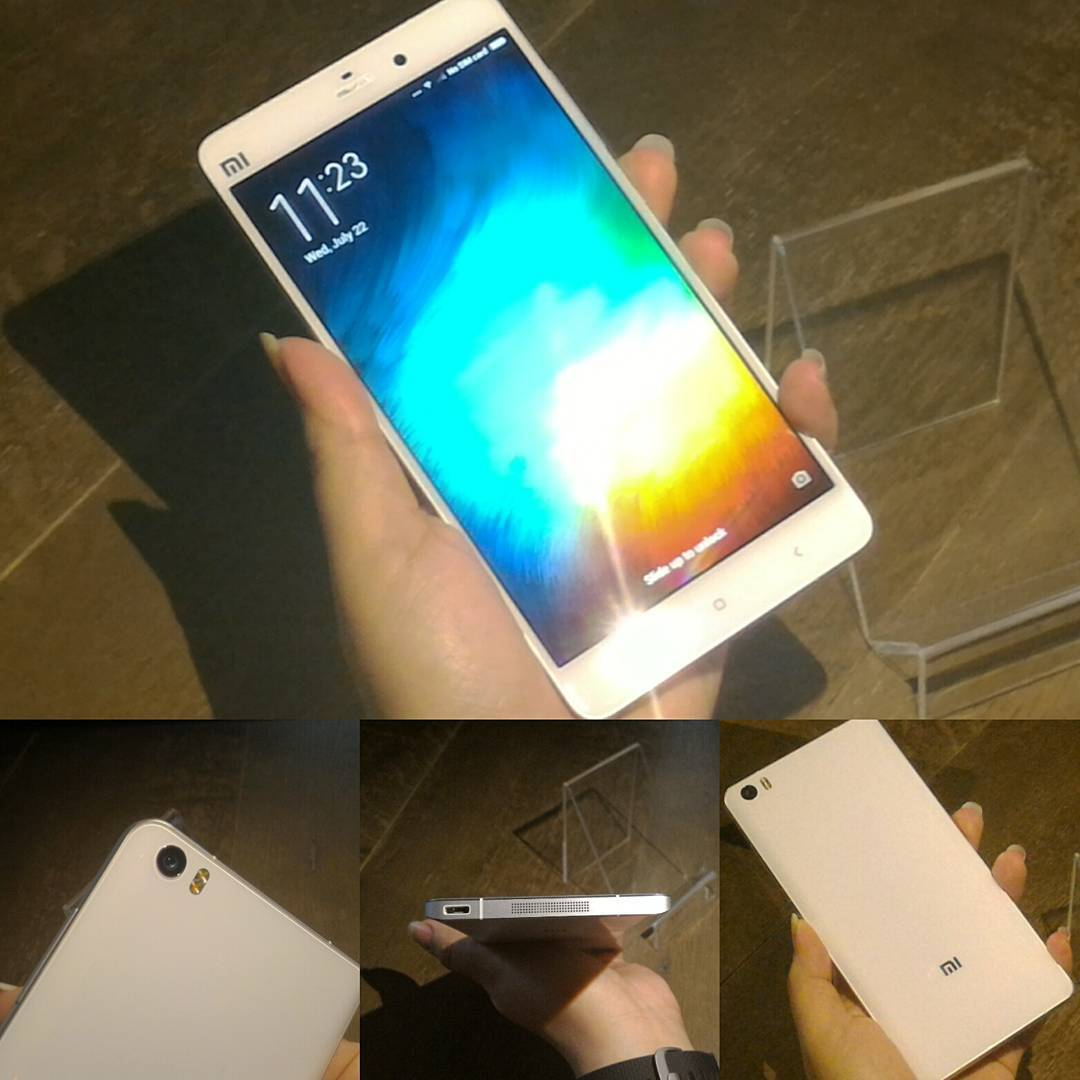
- Xiaomi Mi Note
- Manufacturer: Xiaomi Inc.
- Type: Smartphone
- Series: Xiaomi Mi Note
- First released: January 2015; 11 years ago
- Availability by region: January 2015 (India)
- Discontinued: Yes
- Successor: Xiaomi Mi Note 2
- Related: Xiaomi Mi2S
- Compatible networks: GSM, CDMA, 3G, EVDO, HSDPA, LTE
- Form factor: Bar
- Weight: 150 g (5.29 oz)
- Operating system: Android 4.4.4 (upgradable to Android 6.0 Marshmallow; MIUI)
- CPU: 2.5 GHz quad-core
- Memory: 3&4 (for successor); GB LPDDR3 RAM
- Storage: 16 or 64 GB
- Battery: 3090 mAh
- Rear camera: 13 MP back-side illuminated sensor, HD video (2160p) at 30 frame/s, IR filter, dual warm/cool LED flashes, aperture f/1.8, facial recognition, image stabilization burst mode
- Front camera: 4 MP, HD video (1080p)
- Display: 5 in (130 mm) diagonal (16:9 aspect ratio), multi-touch display, LED backlit IPS TFT LCD, 1080x1920 pixels at 441 ppi
- Data inputs: Multi-touch touchscreen display, microphone, gyroscope, accelerometer, digital compass, proximity sensor, ambient light sensor
- Website: Mi Note; Mi Note Pro

The Xiaomi Mi Note series are smartphones (or phablets) manufactured by Xiaomi. The original Mi Note was released in January 2015 and shipped with Android 4.4.4, later receiving an official update to Android 6.0 Marshmallow with MIUI. The series includes the Mi Note and Mi Note Pro. On October 25, 2016, the Xiaomi Mi Note 2 was released. The Mi Note 3, featuring a Snapdragon 660 processor and a 5.5-inch curved display, was released in September 2017, followed by additional models.

== Versions ==
=== Pro ===
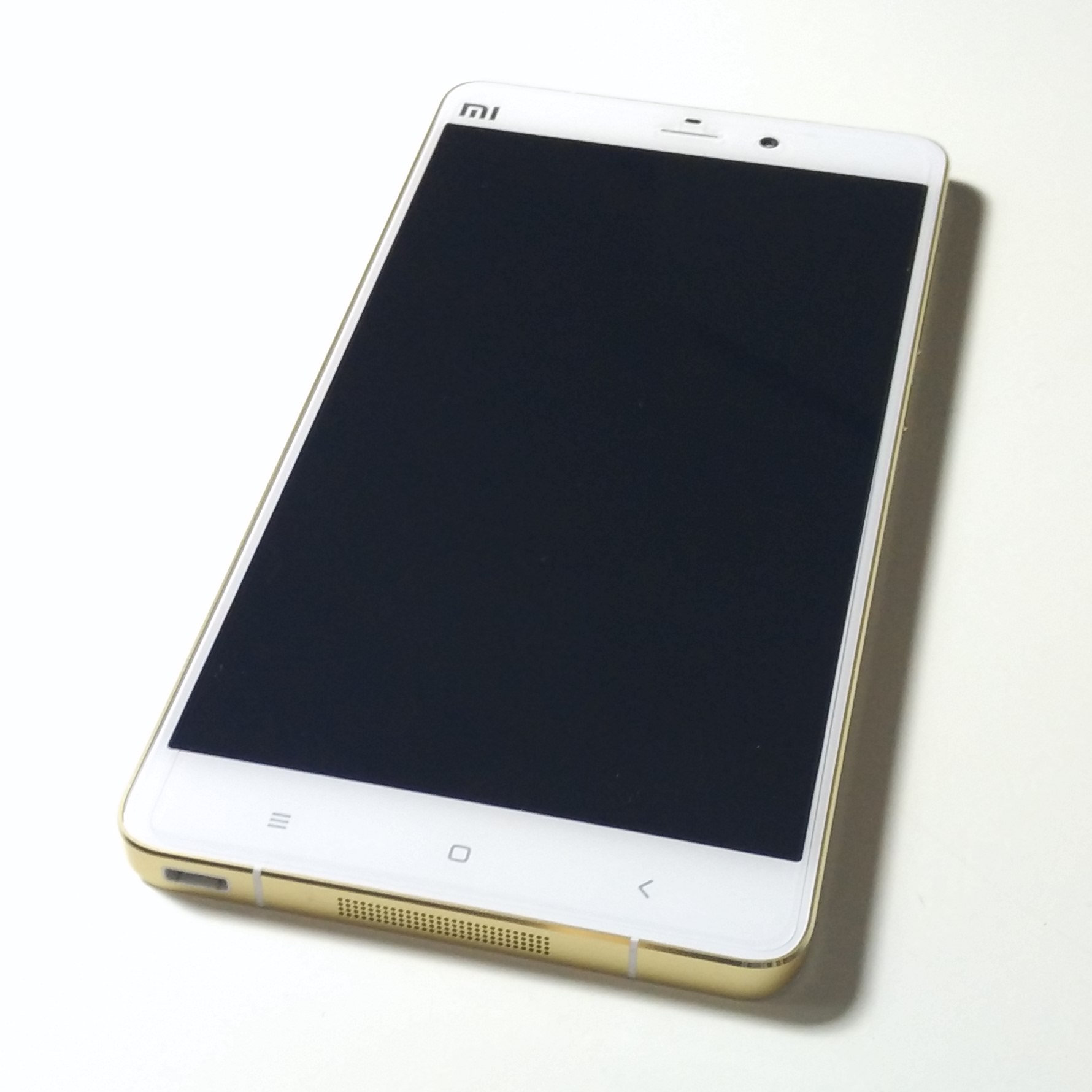
Xiaomi Mi Note Pro

Xiaomi Mi Note Pro was released in China in May 2015. Announced in January 2015, it was intended to be an upgrade to the Xiaomi Mi Note (also announced January 2015). The Mi Note Pro inherited some of its features from its less-powerful predecessor, while upgrading the many features, such as the screen resolution, amount of RAM, battery capacity, and base operating system.

The original Mi Note Pro was relatively difficult to obtain except in China, as the only other way of acquiring it was through third-party carriers, adding a premium to the cost.

==== Hardware ====
The original Mi Note Pro's design is exactly the same as its Mi Note counterpart as they both have a 5.7" display, Gorilla Glass 3 back panel, Dual SIM, 13 MP rear camera with optical image stabilization, auto-focus and dual-LED (dual tone) flash, 3.5 mm headphone jack, micro USB v2.0 port, and so on. However, the Mi Note Pro contains a 2K (1440 × 2560) display, as opposed to the Mi Note's 1080p (1080 × 1920) display, 4 GB RAM (3 GB in the Mi Note), Qualcomm Snapdragon 810 Octa-core CPU (Snapdragon 801 Quad-core 2.5 GHz CPU in the Mi Note), 3090mAh fast-charging battery (3000mAh fast-charging battery in the Mi Note), and comes in a Gold variant in addition to the Black and White variants (only Black and White for Mi Note).

The Mi Note Pro features Xiaomi's Sunlight Display technology, which is meant to adapt the display brightness so that the screen is more visible in the bright outdoors.

The Mi Note Pro comes with 64 GB onboard storage. Unlike the Mi Note's 16 GB/64 GB options, the Mi Note Pro does not come in a 16 GB variant.

==== Software ====
The Mi Note Pro comes pre-installed with Android 5.0.1 "Lollipop" loaded with the MIUI 6 custom skin. One main change of the new UI includes the removal of the app drawer, forcing all installed apps to appear on the home screen. The OS also includes a Themes application that allows the user to change the look of the UI.

The Mi Note's one-handed mode is also found on the Mi Note Pro, and must be enabled in Settings before use. It can be activated by swiping to the left or right from the home button, at which point the screen size can be configured to 3.5, 4 or 4.5 inches.

==== Reception ====
CNET reviewed the Xiaomi Mi Note Pro and noted that it was not officially sold outside China at the time of release. The publication described the device as one of the fastest Xiaomi smartphones available at launch and highlighted its design and build quality.

The review also stated that customers outside China would need to purchase the device through third-party resellers, which could affect warranty coverage and availability of native Google services. CNET additionally noted the absence of certain features, such as a fingerprint sensor.

The publication concluded that the device was competitively priced in the Chinese market compared to other flagship smartphones available during the same period.
