= Xiaomi Mi 4c =

Smartphones manufactured by Xiaomi

- Manufacturer: Xiaomi
- Type: Smartphone
- Series: Mi
- First released: September 2015
- Discontinued: September 22, 2018
- Predecessor: Xiaomi Mi 4
- Successor: Xiaomi Mi 5c
- Related: Xiaomi Mi 4i
- Form factor: Slate phone
- Dimensions: 138.1×69.6×7.8 mm (5.44×2.74×0.31 in)
- Weight: 132 g (5 oz)
- Operating system: Original: MIUI 7 (Android 5.1 Lollipop) Current: MIUI 10.1.1.0 (stable) (Android 7.0 Nougat) Unofficial: LineageOS 20.0 (Android 13)
- System-on-chip: Qualcomm Snapdragon 808
- CPU: Quad-core 1.44GHz Cortex-A53 + Dual-core 1.8GHz Cortex-A57
- GPU: Adreno 418
- Memory: 2 GB/3 GB RAM
- Storage: 16 GB/32 GB
- Battery: Non-removable Li-Po 3080 mAh battery
- Rear camera: 13 MP
- Front camera: 5 MP
- Display: 5.0" 1080 × 1920 pixels, 16M colors
- Connectivity: Wi-Fi 802.11 a/b/g/n/ac, Wi-Fi Direct, hotspot 2G: GSM 850 / 900 / 1800 / 1900; 3G: HSDPA 850 / 900 / 1900 / 2100; 4G: LTE 2100 / 1800 / 2600 /2600 / 1900 / 2300 / 2500; Bluetooth 4.1, A2DP, USB-C
- Codename: libra
- Website: www.mi.com/mi4c/

The Xiaomi Mi 4c (Chinese: 小米手机4c) is a smartphone developed by Xiaomi Inc. It is part of Xiaomi's mid-range smartphone line, and was released in September 2015. It is only available in mainland China.

The Xiaomi Mi4C is equipped with a Snapdragon 808 processor, a 5-inch 1080p IPS display and a 3080 mAh battery. with 2 GB / 3 GB of memory, and 16 GB / 32 GB storage in the two versions. It ran Android 5.1.1 Lollipop with the MIUI 7.2.4.0 ROM and now it's upgradeable to Android 7.0 Nougat with MIUI 10.1.1.0. Unofficially, the device supports up to Android versions up to Android 10 (with LineageOS 17.1). As of 2020, new LineageOS versions are still actively developed for Mi 4c.

Its rear camera is 13 MP with Sony IMX258 or Samsung S5K3M2 and front camera is 5 MP with 1080×1920 resolution for video recording. It weighs 132 grams and its dimensions are 138.1 mm × 69.6 mm × 7.8 mm. It has Wi-Fi 802.11 a/b/g/n/ac, Bluetooth 4.1, GPS, Infrared and USB-C.

The phone was described as an outstanding piece of high-end technology that does not cost as much as its rivals.

It was revealed by AnTuTu that the Mi 4c was one of the 10 most popular phones in China.
