= Xiaomi Mi 6 =

2017 Xiaomi product

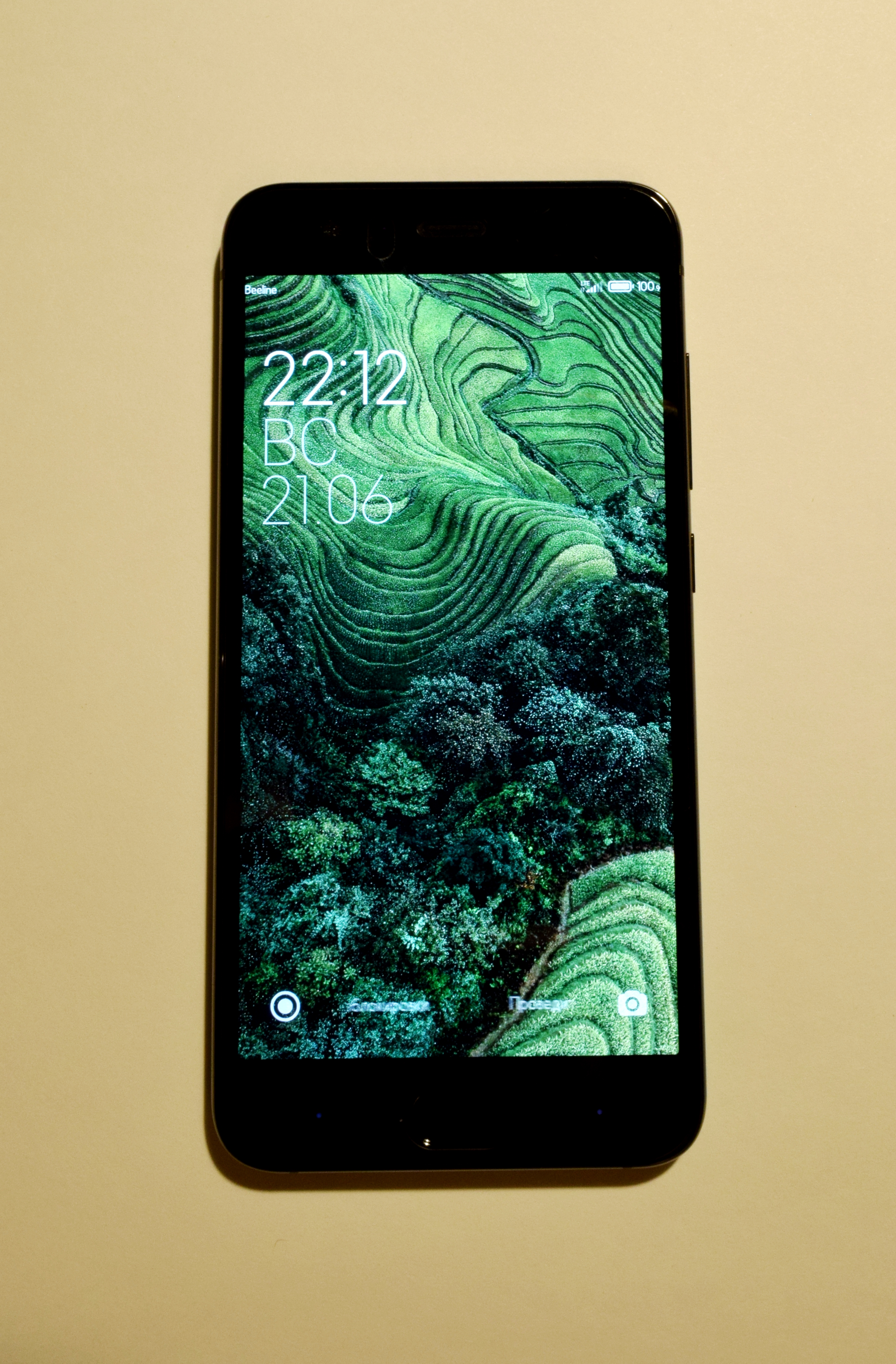
- Xiaomi Mi 6 running MIUI 12
- Brand: Xiaomi
- Manufacturer: Xiaomi
- Type: Smartphone
- Series: Mi series
- First released: April 19, 2017; 9 years ago
- Availability by region: China: April 28, 2017
- Predecessor: Xiaomi Mi 5
- Successor: Xiaomi Mi 8
- Related: Xiaomi Mi 6X; Xiaomi Mi Note 3
- Compatible networks: GSM, 3G, 4G (LTE)
- Form factor: Slate
- Colors: Ceramic Black, Black, Blue, White
- Dimensions: 145.17×70.49×7.45 mm (5.715×2.775×0.293 in)
- Weight: 168 g (6 oz) (glass); 182 g (ceramic)
- Operating system: Original: Android 7.1.1 Nougat with MIUI 8 Current: Android 9 Pie with MIUI 11
- CPU: Qualcomm Snapdragon 835 (10 nm), octa-core (4×2.45 GHz Kryo & 4×1.9 GHz Kryo)
- GPU: Adreno 540
- Memory: 4/6 GB LPDDR4X
- Storage: 64/128 GB UFS 2.1
- Battery: Non-removable Li-Po 3350 mAh; 18 W fast charging, Quick Charge 3.0
- Rear camera: 12 MP, f/1.8, 27 mm (wide), 1/2.9", 1.25 µm, PDAF, 4-axis OIS + 12 MP, f/2.6, 52 mm (telephoto), 1.0 µm, AF, 2x optical zoom Dual-LED dual-tone flash, HDR, panorama Video: 4K@30fps, 1080p@30fps, 720p@120fps
- Front camera: 8 MP; Video: 1080p@30fps
- Display: IPS LCD, 5.15", 1920 × 1080 (Full HD), 16:9 ratio, 428 ppi
- Connectivity: USB-C 2.0, Bluetooth 5.0 (A2DP, LE), NFC, Infrared port, Wi-Fi 802.11ac (dual-band, Wi-Fi Direct, DLNA, hotspot), GPS, A-GPS, GLONASS, BeiDou
- Codename: sagit
- Other: Fingerprint scanner (front-mounted), proximity sensor, ambient light sensor, accelerometer, gyroscope, compass, notification LED, Hall effect sensor, barometer, splash resistant

The Xiaomi Mi 6 is an Android smartphone manufactured by the Chinese company Xiaomi, belonging to the flagship Mi series. It was unveiled on 28 April 2017, exclusively in China. Also, some Chinese importers like GearBest shipped internationally on June 17, 2017.

== Design ==
The screen is made of Corning Gorilla Glass 4. The back panel is made of glass or ceramic depending on the version. The frame of the smartphone is made of stainless steel.

Unlike its predecessor, the smartphone lacks a 3.5 mm audio jack.

The bottom features a USB-C port, a speaker, and a microphone styled to look like a speaker. The top contains a secondary microphone and an infrared port. The left side houses a dual SIM card slot. The right side features the volume rocker and the power button.

The Xiaomi Mi 6 was sold in four colors: Ceramic Black (ceramic model of Black with 18k gold detailing), Black, Blue, and White.

== Technical specifications ==
=== Hardware ===
The smartphone is powered by a Qualcomm Snapdragon 835 processor and an Adreno 540 GPU. The battery has a capacity of 3350 mAh and supports 18 W Quick Charge 3.0 fast charging. It features a 5.15" IPS LCD screen with Full HD (1920 × 1080) resolution, a 16:9 aspect ratio, and a pixel density of 428 ppi. The device was sold in 4/64, 6/64, and 6/128 GB configurations.

=== Camera ===
The smartphone features a dual camera setup: 12 MP, f/1.8 (wide) + 12 MP, f/2.6 (telephoto) with 2x optical zoom; the camera also includes phase-detection autofocus (PDAF), optical image stabilization (OIS), and 4K@30fps video recording capability. The front camera has an 8 MP resolution and can record video at 1080p@30fps.

=== Software ===
The Xiaomi Mi 6 was released with MIUI 8 based on Android 7.1 Nougat. It was updated to MIUI 11 based on Android 9 Pie.
