= Xiaomi Mi 5 =

2016 smartphone by Xiaomi

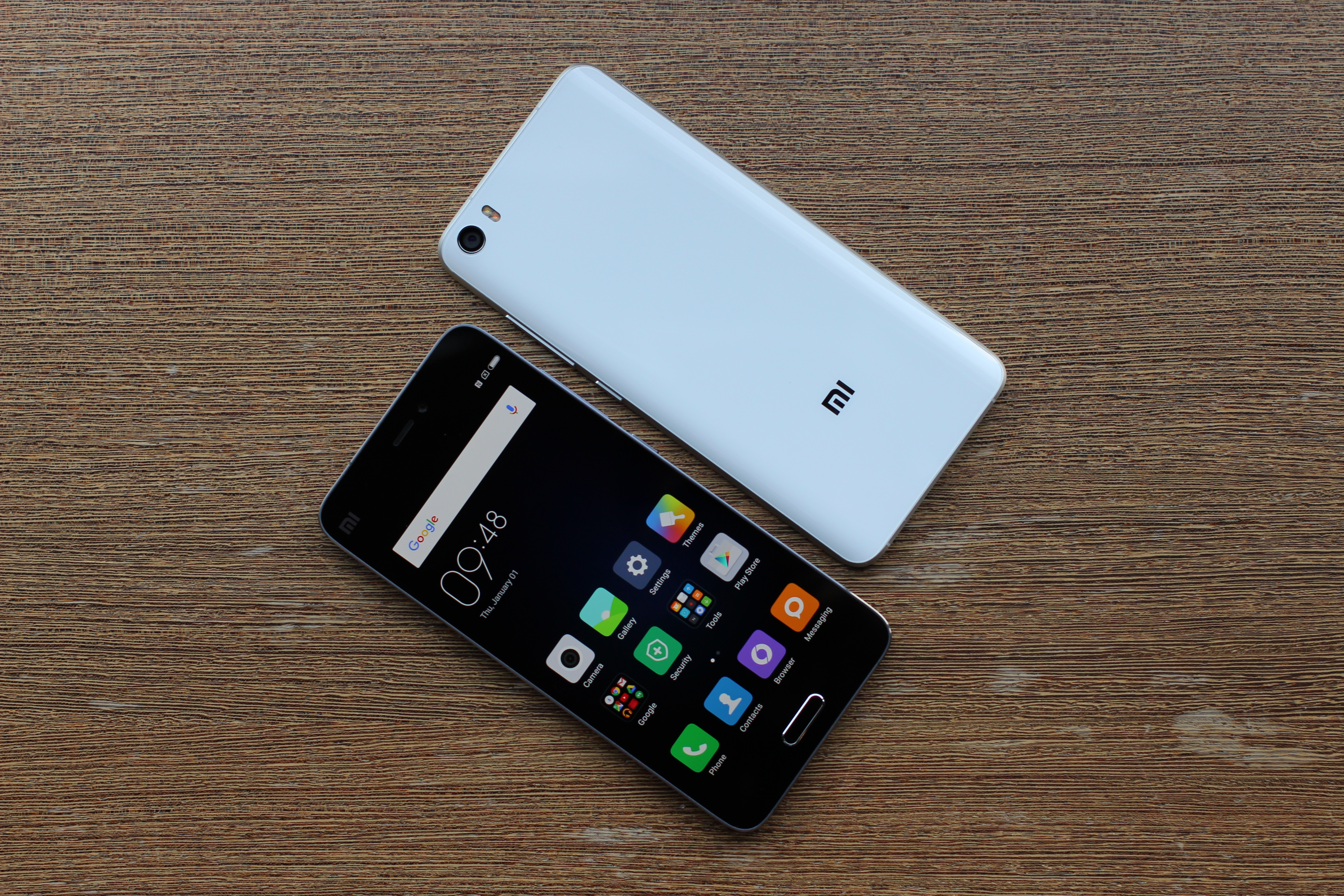
- Manufacturer: Xiaomi Inc.
- Type: Touchscreen Smartphone
- Series: Mi
- First released: Released 2016, April
- Availability by region: 2016, April
- Predecessor: Xiaomi Mi 4
- Successor: Xiaomi Mi 5s Xiaomi Mi 5s Plus; Xiaomi Mi 6
- Compatible networks: 2G bands : GSM 850 / 900 / 1800 / 1900 - SIM 1 and SIM 2 3G bands : HSDPA 850 / 900 / 1900 / 2100 & TD-SCDMA CDMA2000 1xEV-DO - China 4G bands : LTE band 1(2100), 3(1800), 5(850), 7(2600), 38(2600), 39(1900), 40(2300), 41(2500) - Global LTE band 1(2100), 3(1800), 7(2600), 38(2600), 39(1900), 40(2300), 41(2500) - China Speed : HSPA 42.2/5.76 Mbps, LTE-A (3CA) Cat12 600/150 Mbps GPRS : Yes EDGE : Yes
- Form factor: Slate
- Dimensions: 144.6 mm × 69.2 mm × 7.3 mm (5.69 in × 2.72 in × 0.29 in)
- Weight: 129 g / 139 g (Ceramic) (4.90 oz)
- Operating system: Android 6.0 (Marshmallow), upgradable to Android 8.0 (Oreo); MIUI 10
- CPU: Quad-core (2x1.8 GHz Kryo & 2x1.36 GHz Kryo) - Standard edition Quad-core (2x2.15 GHz Kryo & 2x1.6 GHz Kryo) - Prime & Pro edition
- GPU: Adreno 530
- Memory: 128 GB, 4 GB RAM - Pro edition 64 GB, 3 GB RAM - Prime edition 32 GB, 3 GB RAM - Standard
- Battery: Non-removable Li-Po 3000 mAh battery Charging : Fast battery charging 18W (Quick Charge 3.0)
- Rear camera: Single : 16 MP, f/2.0, 1/2.8", 1.12μm, 4-axis OIS, PDAF Features : Dual-LED dual-tone flash, panorama, HDR Video : 2160p@30fps, 1080p@30fps, 720p@120fps
- Front camera: Single : 4 MP, f/2.0, 1/3", 2μm Video : 1080p@30fps
- Display: Type : IPS LCD capacitive touchscreen, 16M colors Size : 5.15 inches, 73.1 cm2 (~73.1% screen-to-body ratio) Resolution : 1080 x 1920 pixels, 16:9 ratio (~428 ppi density) Protection : Corning Gorilla Glass 4
- Data inputs: Multi-touch touchscreen display, microphone, gyroscope, accelerometer, digital compass, proximity sensor, ambient light sensor
- Codename: gemini
- SAR: 0.70 W/kg (head) 1.42 W/kg (body)
- Website: https://www.mi.com/global/mi5/https://www.gsmarena.com/xiaomi_mi_5-6948.php

The Xiaomi Mi 5 (Chinese: 小米手机5) is a smartphone developed by the Chinese electronics manufacturer company Xiaomi for its high-end smartphone line, released in February 2016. The Xiaomi Mi 5 has a 5.15-inch 1080p screen, a Snapdragon 820 processor, a 3,000-mAh battery and a Sony Exmor IMX 16-megapixel camera. The standard version has 3 GB of RAM (random-access memory) with 32 GB of storage space (UFS2.0). The advanced version has the same amount of RAM with 64 GB of storage space (UFS2.0). The premium edition has 4 GB of RAM and 128 GB of storage (UFS 2.0). It was released 528 days after the Xiaomi Mi 4 went on sale, and the Xiaomi Mi 5 was a long time coming after a flood of flagship phones from different brands.

== History ==
There were many reasons for the delay in launching the fifth generation of Xiaomi phones in 2015. First of all, Huawei's crackdown on Xiaomi was particularly severe in 2015. Therefore, Xiaomi needed to make a comeback through the release of Mi 5. Secondly, Xiaomi has always stood on the market with low price and cost performance, but the price of the Mi 5 is more than 2000 yuan, which was becoming the highest price in history, so Xiaomi wanted to reduce the price through additional technology research and development. In addition, the Mi 5 launched during the 2016 mobile world congress (MWC) brought better exposure and higher consumer awareness of marketing strategies, which helped Xiaomi better promote its new phones to meet its sales target. Besides, the Qualcomm Snapdragon 820 running on the Xiaomi Mi 5 is highly anticipated, so the compatibility of the processor had to be perfected before releasing the phone. In addition, the delay of the release of the Xiaomi Mi 5 was attributed to the overheating of the Snapdragon 810 chip, which caused the phone to not work smoothly and led the company to test the performance of the Qualcomm Snapdragon 820 on the Xiaomi Mi 5.

== Features ==
=== System and software ===
The factory system (UI) of Xiaomi Mi 5 is MIUI 7. This system plays very well in the Xiaomi Mi 5. However, when some applications are running in the background, a short pause is inevitable, but it does not affect the normal use. The Xiaomi Mi 5 features a powerful Qualcomm Snapdragon 820 processor. At the end of 2017, Xiaomi Mi 5 updated the available MIUI V9.1.1.0 with unique optimizations including a notification panel that can respond quickly, split-screen or multi-window support, image search, improved performance and application processing. In late 2018, Xiaomi announced that after the last stable release of MIUI 10.2, there will be no more updates to MIUI on Xiaomi Mi 5 phones.

The Mi 5 is among few smartphones to support Apple's proprietary "AirPlay" protocol.

The Mi 5 allows bootloader unlocking and custom ROMs installs, and as a result the phone can be updated to Android 15 with the degoogled lineageOS or LineageOS with microG. The Mi 5 also allows change the name of the SIM network at will.

==== Design ====
The 5.15 Mi 5 is indeed one of the most compact and lightweight flagships. It is 144.6 mm × 69.2 mm × 7.3 mm wide and 2 mm tall, but the hair is narrower and thinner than the 5.1 Galaxy S7. The Mi 5 weighs just 129 g - 23 g lighter than the Galaxy S7 with a similar design. The Mi 5 has a familiar double glazing design with a silver frame. Both pieces are made from the latest Gorilla Glass 4 material. The rear glass bends around the long edges, while the front is completely flat. Xiaomi has set chamfered edges on the frame to complement the soft curve on the back, which works best in this combination. It also improves grip, enhances the appearance and makes handling more comfortable. Monitors may look almost bezel-less, but they aren't. A metal frame is a border, and it takes a while to get used to it when swiping a card because most of the time people's thumbs scratch the metal and then seamlessly enter the screen. It wasn't unpleasant, but it wasn't common at first. The front is also sleek, with a reflective "Mi" logo at the top, a front-facing camera next to it, and slim buttons underneath the 5.1-inch display. A single button has an embedded fingerprint sensor, which is very fast. Xiaomi is playing out the phone's almost baffle-free features. Although the space between the edge of the phone and the screen is very small, there is a large black bar around the monitor, which ruins the illusion. In fact, the Mi 5 has about the same number of borders as the HTC 10.

== Marketing ==
Xiaomi's darkest hour came in the year before the Mi 5 went on sale. Xiaomi, China's leading smartphone maker, has endured a year of intense pressure from Huawei and Apple. Other Chinese smartphone giants, such as Vivo and Oppo, have made efforts in retail to avoid these additional pressures. In this dilemma, Xiaomi Mi 5 is just a sharp tool to fight a battle of survival and keep Xiaomi's market share in China. In 2014, Xiaomi's share of the global smartphone market was only 5%, far less than Samsung's 26% and Apple's 12%. Incrementally, Xiaomi has progressed to become the biggest competitor of Huawei and Apple in China. Xiaomi's biggest effort has been to expand its market. In 2019, Apple's sales declined because China is a relatively large market with endless opportunities. However, Huawei technologies and Xiaomi have achieved good results in China in recent years, so Xiaomi has put considerable pressure on Apple. Xiaomi is not just a smartphone maker; it also makes other products, including headphones, gaming laptops, fitness watches, smart light bulbs and more. Perhaps if people are not interested in Xiaomi's smartphones, they may still be interested in its ancillary products. Xiaomi is often referred to by others as "the Apple of China" largely due to its phones resembling that of Apple's iPhone. However, Xiaomi has created some special phones after continuous independent research and development. There is a big difference between Xiaomi and Apple: Xiaomi has a wider range of sales and hardware services than Apple, and its phones have higher cost performance. But at the same time, cost-effective phones are losing their edge. This means that Xiaomi may need to improve its original marketing model and gradually adapt to the current global smartphone market, or it could still gradually cultivate Xiaomi's "fanatical fans" to follow the old way. Now Xiaomi, as an international brand, is working hard to expand its position in offline retail. This is also Xiaomi's global expansion plan. In order to take a larger share of the international market, they plan to carry out more business with a smaller profit. After expanding successfully in India and Europe, Xiaomi is now looking at South America. The first Xiaomi store in Chile opened in Santiago on April 27, attracting 1,500 customers on the first day. In the future, Xiaomi will also open more physical stores in Chile, and introduce Mi home ecosystem to Chile as soon as possible. This is not the first time Xiaomi has entered the South American market. Xiaomi entered Latin America and South America in 2017 through Redmi 4X sales in Mexico. "Mexico is a very important market for us and is our starting point to the rest of Latin America," Donovan Sung, Xiaomi's global director of product management and marketing, said in a news release. "We hope to continue to grow here with the continued support of our passionate Mi fans." And it plans to enter the American market in 2019, but the fact is not easy, there seem to be some problems. Previously, Xiaomi Mi 8 was deemed to copy the iPhone X with similar facial recognition and camera layout. As for the current situation, Xiaomi is still in the stage of expansion and has not reached a fully mature market share. There may be room for its market share to rise. Xiaomi's expansion strategy now is to stabilize its gains in Europe and India, and then continue to expand elsewhere.

== Reception ==
The Xiaomi Mi 5 received a lot of good reviews after its release. There are many reasons for this.

GSMArena states that: "Xiaomi made it easy for us. The Mi 5 is one of the most beautiful, most powerful, and most capable smartphones to date and there is little to dwell on it. If the Mi 5 is available in your geographic region, our recommendation is to grab one right away. The Snapdragon 820 chip, the ry bright screen, the enhanced 16MP snapper with 4-axis OIS, and the beefy battery are all an excellent complement to the charismatic Xiaomi Mi 5. The Android 6.0 Marshmallow allowed for native fingerprint reader and USB Type-C support, while the MIUI 7 launcher is as neat as ever. The Xiaomi Mi 5 has no competition within its price bracket. The rest of the Snapdragon 820 devices are twice as expensive, as is the iPhone 6s. "

Gadgets360 states that: "Xiaomi may be better known for its budget smartphones, but with the Mi 5 it has shown that it is more than capable of building a competent premium device as well. Although a lot of people will have problems with the price and the general idea that Xiaomi is even trying to build something premium, we feel that it's time to move on and give the company the respect it deserves. The Mi 5 is a solid effort that succeeds in giving you a flagship smartphone experience at a price that we consider excellent for a phone of this quality."

According to an author from ANDROID AUTHORITY, the Mi 5's design, display, performance, hardware, battery life, camera, and software are impressive, especially at this price point. "Xiaomi has yet again raised the bar for what an affordable smartphone should be, and much like in previous years, rival OEMs will certainly need to up their game to topple Xiaomi's latest flagship."

But one phone can't be perfect, and there have been some comments pointing to problems.

An author from Forbes said that: "The volume rocker on the side is slightly wobbly, making for the only "flaw" in what is otherwise top-notch craftsmanship. The Mi 5 runs Xiaomi's own MIUI skin over Android 6.0, and much like Meizu's Flyme OS, it's a lot cleaner than people in the west might think. The two major differences that fans of stock Android would notice right away are the lack of an app drawer, and the notification shade, which is split into two tabs (a la Huawei's EMUI). One side is notifications, the other is toggles for things like WiFi, Bluetooth, volume, etc. I don't particularly love this two-part take (because it requires an extra swipe left/right to do most things), but it's not that annoying."

" Xiaomi seems to be running an overly aggressive background app killing setting that'll close most apps running in the background if they've not been used for a while. It's difficult to assess exactly how long this time period has to be, but I found common apps like GroupMe and Hangouts, among plenty of others, having to reload every time I went back to them. I don't spend all day in chat apps but it's annoying waiting for them to load back up again, and sometimes I even found that notifications were delayed until I opened the app again. This happened most often with Google's Inbox and caused me to miss emails a number of times. This is all done to save battery, which it certainly achieves, but it creates a negative user experience when it does happen, and is less desirable than just killing my battery quicker."

== Comparisons ==
Name	Display	CPU	GPU	Battery	Operational system (original)	Video Recording	Dimensions	Weight	Main camera	Battery life	Colors
Xiaomi Mi 4	5.0 inches, 68.9 cm^{2} (~72.3% screen-to-body ratio)	Quad-core 2.5 GHz Krait 400	Adreno 330 578 MHz	Non-removable Li-Ion 3080 mAh battery	MIUI v5 (Android 4.4 Kitkat)	1920x1080 @30 fps	139.2 mm (5.48 in) H 68.5 mm (2.70 in) W 8.9 mm (0.35 in) D	149 g (5.26 oz)	LED flash, panorama, HDR	68h endurance rating	Black, White
Xiaomi Mi 5	5.15 inches, 73.1 cm^{2} (~73.1% screen-to-body ratio)	Quad-core (2x1.8 GHz Kryo & 2x1.36 GHz Kryo) - Standard edition Quad-core (2x2.15 GHz Kryo & 2x1.6 GHz Kryo) - Prime & Pro edition	Adreno 530	Non-removable Li-Po 3000 mAh battery	Android 6.0 (Marshmallow)	1920x1080 @30 fps	144.6 mm × 69.2 mm × 7.3 mm (5.69 in × 2.72 in × 0.29 in)	129 g (4.55 oz)	Dual-LED dual-tone flash, panorama, HDR	92h endurance rating	Gold, Black White
Xiaomi Mi 5s	5.15 inches, 73.1 cm^{2} (~71.4% screen-to-body ratio)	Quad-core (2x2.15 GHz Kryo & 2x1.6 GHz Kryo)	Adreno 530	3200 mAh	Android 6.0 (Marshmallow)	1920x1080 @30 fps	145.6 mm × 70.3 mm × 8.3 mm (5.73 in × 2.77 in × 0.33 in)	145 g (5.11 oz)	Dual-LED dual-tone flash, panorama	Endurance rating 84h	Silver, Gray, Gold, Rose Gold
