= Xiaomi Mi 2S =

Smartphones manufactured by Xiaomi

- Also known as: Xiaomi Phone 2S, Mi2S
- Manufacturer: Xiaomi
- Type: Smartphone
- Series: Mi
- First released: 9 April 2013
- Availability by region: China April 2013
- Predecessor: Xiaomi Mi 2
- Successor: Xiaomi Mi 3
- Related: Xiaomi Mi 2A
- Compatible networks: GSM 850, 900, 1800, and 1900 MHz & WCDMA 850, 1900 and 2100 MHz
- Form factor: Slate
- Dimensions: 126 mm (5.0 in) H 62 mm (2.4 in) W 10.2 mm (0.40 in) D
- Weight: 145 g (5.1 oz)
- Operating system: Original: MIUI V5 (Android 4.1 Jelly Bean); Current: MIUI 9 (Android 5.0.1 Lollipop)
- System-on-chip: Qualcomm Snapdragon 600 APQ8064T
- CPU: Quad-Core Krait 300 @ 1.7 GHz
- GPU: Adreno 320
- Memory: 2 GB RAM
- Storage: 16 GB / 32 GB ROM
- Removable storage: None
- Battery: 2000 mAh
- Rear camera: 8 Megapixels (16 GB version) / 13 Megapixels (32 GB version) (backside-illuminated (BSI)), Records 1080p at 30fps and 720p at 90fps
- Front camera: 2 Megapixels, 1080p at 30fps
- Display: IPS Display 4.3 inches @ 1280px x 720px (341 PPI) (Manufactured by Sharp Inc.)
- Connectivity: List: Bluetooth 4.0 + A2DP; Wi-Fi (802.11 b/g/n); Wi-Fi Direct; Micro-USB On-The-Go with MHL link; DLNA
- Data inputs: Capacitive touch screen
- Codename: aries
- Made in: China
- Website: mi.com/mi2s

Xiaomi Mi 2S (often referred to as Xiaomi Phone 2S, Chinese: 小米手机2s), is a high-end, Android smartphone produced by Xiaomi. The device features a quad-core 1.7 GHz Qualcomm Snapdragon 600 as its CPU.

Two variations of the Mi2S have been released, a 16 GB and a 32 GB model. In addition to storage amount also the back camera is also different. The 16 GB model features an 8-megapixel camera with aperture f/2.0, whereas the 32 GB model features a 13-megapixel camera with aperture f/2.2. Moreover, the lenses have 35 mm equivalent focal length of 27 mm on the 16 GB model compared to 28 mm on the 32 GB model. The devices were initially sold in China for ¥1999 for the 16 GB model, and ¥2299 for the 32 GB model.

== Specifications ==
=== Hardware ===
The casing of the Xiaomi Mi 2S is mostly made from plastic, with SIM card slots located inside. The microUSB port is located at the bottom of the device with the audio jack located at the top of the device. The power and volume keys were located on the right side of device. Near the top of the device are a front-facing camera, proximity sensors, and a notification LED. In particular, the proximity sensors are mostly used to detect whether the device is in a pocket or not. The device is widely available in white, green, yellow, blue, red and pink color finishes. The device's display is larger than its predecessor, with a 4.3-inch, 720p IPS LCD capacitive touchscreen with a resolution of ~342 ppi, and Dragontrail glass.

The model is one of two variations of the Xiaomi Mi 2 Xiaomi created before creating the Xiaomi Mi 3. The device comes with either 16 GB or 32 GB of internal storage. It contains a 2000 mAh battery.

=== Software ===
The Mi 2S shipped with Android 4.1 "Jelly Bean" and Xiaomi's MIUI V5 user interface. Later, the smartphone was updated to Android 5.0.1 "Lollipop" with MIUI 9.

== See also ==
- Xiaomi
- MIUI

Preceded by Xiaomi Mi2A	Xiaomi Mi2S; 2013	Succeeded by Xiaomi Mi3
