= Xiaomi Mi 1 =

Smartphones manufactured by Xiaomi

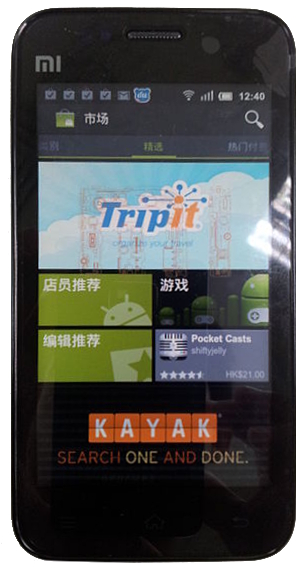
- Xiaomi Mi 1
- Also known as: Xiaomi Mi1, Xiaomi Mi One, Xiaomi Phone
- Manufacturer: Xiaomi
- Type: Smartphone
- Series: Mi
- First released: August 16, 2011; 15 years ago
- Availability by region: China October 1, 2011; 14 years ago
- Successor: Xiaomi Mi 1S, Xiaomi Mi 2
- Compatible networks: GSM, WCDMA, CDMA2000
- Dimensions: 125 mm (4.9 in) H 63 mm (2.5 in) W 11.9 mm (0.47 in) D
- Weight: 149 g (5.3 oz)
- Operating system: Original: MIUI V2.3 (Android 2.3 Gingerbread); Current: MIUI V5 (Android 4.1 Jelly Bean)
- CPU: Qualcomm MSM8260, MSM8660 (CDMA2000 version for China Telecom) Snapdragon S3 Dual Core @ 1.5GHz / S3 Dual Core @ 1.7GHz for MI-OneS
- GPU: Adreno 220
- Memory: 1GB RAM
- Battery: 1930mAh
- Rear camera: 8 Megapixels F2.4 Lens, 1080p/30fps video recording
- Front camera: 2 Megapixels
- Display: Sharp Inc. LCD 4.0in @ 480px x 854px (245 ppi) 16M colors (Toshiba for part/all the later production)
- Connectivity: (Bluetooth: AVRCP, A2DP, OBEX) (WiFi: 802.11 b/g/n)
- Data inputs: Touch screen
- Codename: mione

Xiaomi Mi 1, (often referred to as Xiaomi Phone) (simplified Chinese: 小米手机; traditional Chinese: 小米手機; pinyin: Xiǎomǐ Shǒujī), was a high-end, Android smartphone produced by Xiaomi. The device uses a Qualcomm Snapdragon S3 (dual core, 1.5 GHz) as its CPU and an Adreno 220 as its GPU. The device is initially sold at a price of ¥1999. When it was released, the device received more than 300,000 pre-orders in the first 34 hours.

On 20 December 2011, the company announced a partnership with Chinese telco China Unicom. The plan was to offer one million custom Mi 1 models at ¥2699 at Unicom stores on various two to three-year term contracts.

== Specifications ==
=== Hardware ===
The casing of the Xiaomi Mi 1 is mostly made from plastic, with SIM card slots located inside. The microUSB port is located at the bottom of the device with the audio jack located at the top of the device. The volume keys were located on the right side of device meanwhile the power key was located at the top of the device. Near the top of the device are a front-facing camera and proximity sensors. The device is widely available in white, pink, blue, yellow, purple and grey color finishes. The device's display is a 4-inch, TFT capacitive touchscreen with a resolution of ~245ppi.

The CPU of the Xiaomi Mi 1 is a Qualcomm Snapdragon S3 dual-core chip with 1.5GHz per core. Meanwhile the GPU is the Adreno 220 and the phone has 1GB of RAM.

The model is one of two variations of the Xiaomi Mi 1 Xiaomi created before creating the Xiaomi Mi2. The device comes with a 1930mAh battery.

=== Software ===
The Xiaomi Mi 1 ships with Android and Xiaomi's MIUI user experience.

==== Updates ====
Updates for the Xiaomi Mi 1 is available in three channels: stable, developer and daily. New stable builds are usually available every month with major changes between each update, new developer builds are usually available every week with small but sometimes significant features added between each update and new beta builds are usually available every Wednesdays and usually only contain small fixes and optimizations. Beta builds are only available to some beta testers selected on MIUI's community forums. To update between versions, users usually use an over-the-air updater application.

== See also ==
- Xiaomi
- MIUI

Preceded by none	Xiaomi Mi 1; 2011	Succeeded by Xiaomi Mi 1S
