= Xiaomi 13 Lite =

2023 smartphone model

Xiaomi 13 Lite Xiaomi Civi 2
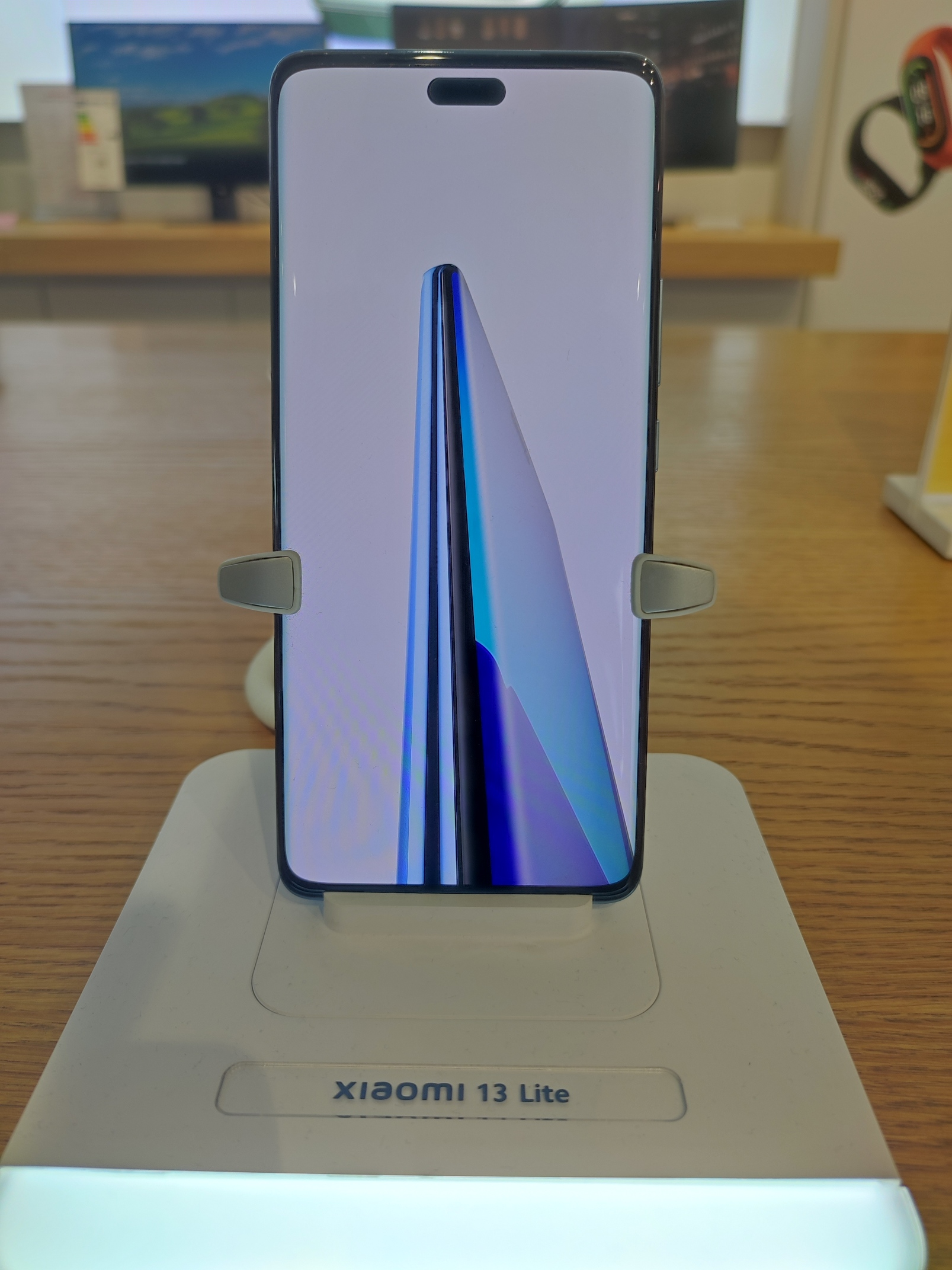
- Front of the Xiaomi 13 Lite
- Manufacturer: Xiaomi
- Type: Phablet
- Series: Xiaomi/Civi
- First released: Civi 2: September 27, 2022; 4 years ago
- Predecessor: Xiaomi 12 Lite; Xiaomi Civi
- Successor: Xiaomi 14 Civi; Xiaomi Civi 3
- Compatible networks: GSM, 3G, 4G (LTE), 5G
- Form factor: Slate
- Colors: 13 Lite: Lite Pink, Lite Blue, Lite Black; Civi 2: Little White Dress, Pounding Powder, Ice Blue, Hazy Black
- Dimensions: 159.2 mm (6.27 in) H 72.7 mm (2.86 in) W 7.23 mm (0.285 in) D
- Weight: 13 Lite: 171 g (6.0 oz); Civi 2: 171.8 g (6.06 oz)
- Operating system: Original: 13 Lite: Android 12 with MIUI 14; Civi 2: Android 12 with MIUI 13; Current: Android 15 with Xiaomi HyperOS 2
- System-on-chip: Qualcomm SM7450-AB Snapdragon 7 Gen 1 (4 nm)
- CPU: Octa-core (1×2.4 GHz Cortex-A710 & 3×2.36 GHz Cortex-A710 & 4×1.8 GHz Cortex-A510)
- GPU: Adreno 644
- Memory: 13 Lite: 8 GB; Civi 2: 8/12 GB; LPDDR4X
- Storage: 13 Lite: 64/128/256 GB; Civi 2: 128/256 GB; UFS 2.2
- SIM: Dual SIM
- Battery: Non-removable Li-Po 4500 mAh
- Charging: Fast charging 67 W, 100% in 40 min (advertised), Power Delivery 3.0
- Rear camera: Wide: 50 MP Sony IMX766, f/1.8, 23 mm, 86°, 1/1.56", 1 µm, PDAF; Ultrawide: 13 Lite: 8 MP Sony IMX355, f/2.2, 119˚, 1/4.0", 1.12 µm Civi 2: 20 MP, f/2.2, 115˚, 1/2.78", 1 µm Macro: 2 MP GalaxyCore GC02M1, f/2.4 Other: Dual-LED flash, HDR, panorama Video: 4K@30fps, 1080p@30/60/120fps, 720p@960fps; gyro-EIS
- Front camera: 13 Lite: 32 MP, f/2.4, 100° (ultrawide), 1/2.74", 0.8 µm + 8 MP, f/2.3 (depth sensor); Civi 2: 32 MP, f/2.0 (wide), 1/2.8", 0.8 µm, AF + 32 MP, f/2.4, 100° (ultrawide), 1/2.74", 0.8 µm Dual-LED dual-tone flash, HDR; Video: 1080p@30/60fps
- Display: AMOLED, 6.55", 2400 × 1080 (Full HD+), 20:9, 402 ppi, 120 Hz, HDR10+
- Model: 13 Lite: 2210129SG; Civi 2: 2210129SC
- Made in: China
- Website: www.mi.com/global/product/xiaomi-13-lite

The Xiaomi 13 Lite is a mid-range Android smartphone manufactured and marketed by Xiaomi. It was officially announced on February 26, 2023, at MWC 2023 alongside the global versions of the Xiaomi 13 and Xiaomi 13 Pro. Additionally, the Xiaomi Civi 2 was unveiled in China on September 27, 2022, featuring an older version of MIUI and more advanced front cameras.

== Design ==
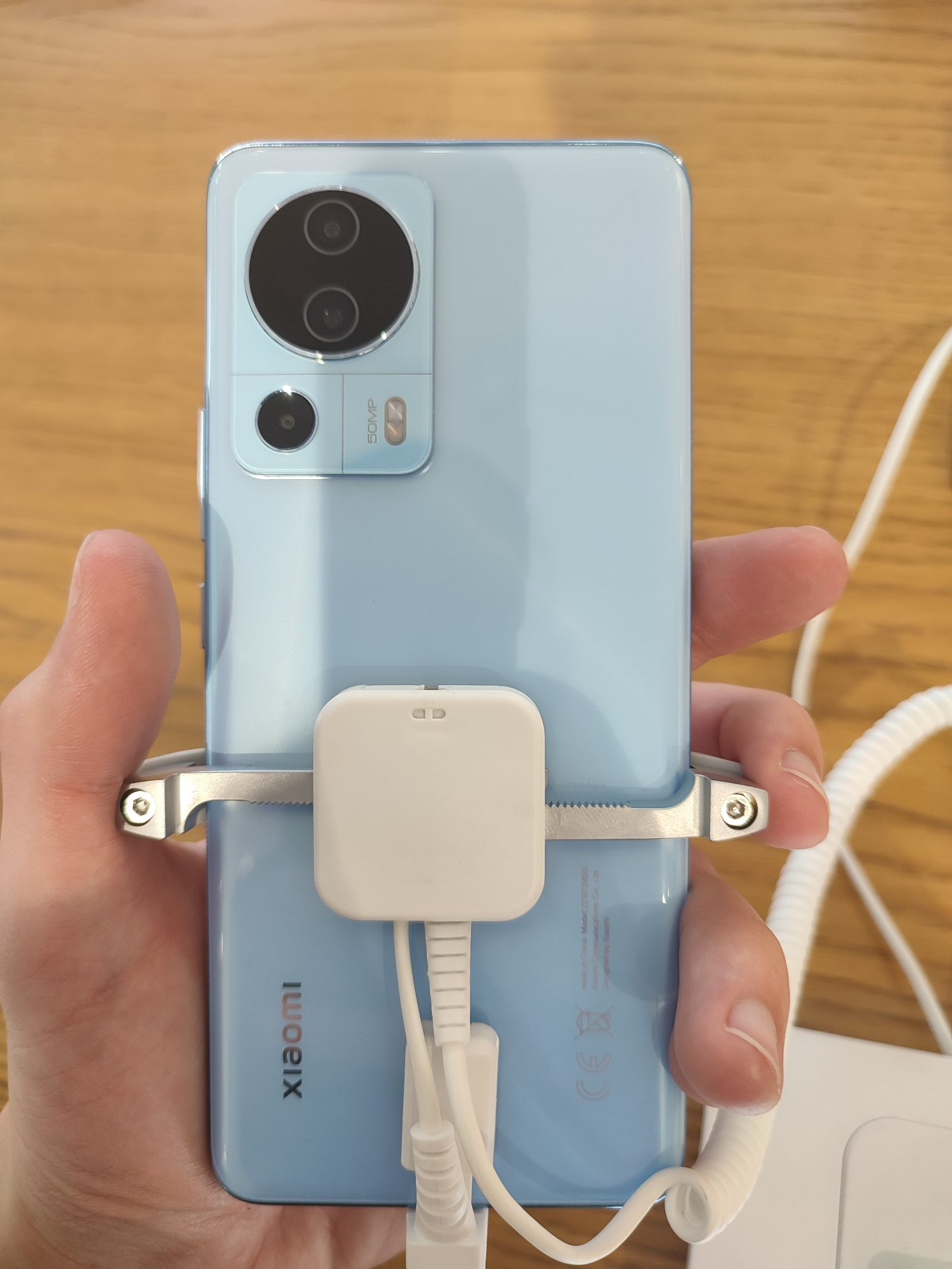
Rear panel of the Xiaomi 13 Lite in Lite Blue

The front display is protected by curved Corning Gorilla Glass 5 and an IP53 rating for dust and splash resistance. The rear panel is made of glass with curved edges, while the sides feature a glossy plastic frame.

In terms of design, the smartphone closely resembles the Xiaomi 12 series.

On the bottom, there is a USB-C port, a loudspeaker, a primary microphone, and a dual SIM card slot. The top features a secondary microphone and an IR blaster. The right side houses the volume rocker and power button.

The Xiaomi 13 Lite was sold in three color options: Lite Pink, Lite Blue, and Lite Black.

The Xiaomi Civi 2 was sold in four color options: Little White Dress (white with a patterned texture), Pounding Powder (pink), Ice Blue, and Hazy Black.

== Specifications ==
=== Hardware ===
The smartphones are powered by the Qualcomm Snapdragon 7 Gen 1 system-on-chip paired with an Adreno 644 GPU.

=== Battery ===
The devices are equipped with a 4500 mAh non-removable battery supporting 67 W fast charging.

=== Camera ===
The Xiaomi 13 Lite features a triple rear camera setup: a 50 MP, f/1.8 (wide) main sensor with phase-detection autofocus (PDAF), an 8 MP, f/2.2 (ultrawide) sensor with a 119° field of view, and a 2 MP, f/2.4 (macro) lens. On the front, it features a dual setup consisting of a 32 MP, f/2.4 (ultrawide) sensor with a 110° field of view and an 8 MP, f/2.3 depth sensor.

The Xiaomi Civi 2 features a triple rear camera setup: a 50 MP, f/1.8 (wide) main sensor with PDAF, a 20 MP, f/2.2 (ultrawide) sensor with a 115° field of view, and a 2 MP, f/2.4 (macro) lens. Its dual front camera setup consists of a 32 MP, f/2.0 (wide) primary sensor with autofocus and a 32 MP, f/2.4 (ultrawide) sensor with a 110° field of view.

Both models support video recording up to 4K at 30 fps on the rear camera and 1080p at 60 fps on the front camera. Furthermore, both models feature dual front-facing LED flashes.

=== Display ===
The display is a 6.55-inch AMOLED panel with a Full HD+ resolution (2400 × 1080), 402 ppi pixel density, 20:9 aspect ratio, 120 Hz refresh rate, and HDR10+ support. It features a centered pill-shaped cutout for the dual front cameras and an optical under-display fingerprint sensor.

=== Memory ===
The Xiaomi 13 Lite was available in 8/64 GB, 8/128 GB, and 8/256 GB configurations, while the Xiaomi Civi 2 was offered in 8/128 GB, 8/256 GB, and 12/256 GB options.

=== Software ===
The Xiaomi 13 Lite launched with MIUI 14, whereas the Xiaomi Civi 2 shipped with MIUI 13. Both software builds were initially based on Android 12. Both models were subsequently updated to Xiaomi HyperOS 3 based on Android 15.

== Xiaomi Civi 2 Hello Kitty Limited Edition ==
The Xiaomi Civi 2 Hello Kitty Limited Edition is a special edition of the Xiaomi Civi 2 themed around the popular Japanese media franchise character Hello Kitty. This edition features a custom rear cover design with Hello Kitty patterns that change color to pink under ultraviolet light, along with themed packaging, stickers, a protective case, custom wallpapers, and UI widgets. It was available exclusively in a 12/256 GB memory configuration.
