= Xiaomi Mi 10 Lite =

Xiaomi 5G smartphone

Xiaomi Mi 10 Lite 5G Xiaomi Mi 10 Youth Edition
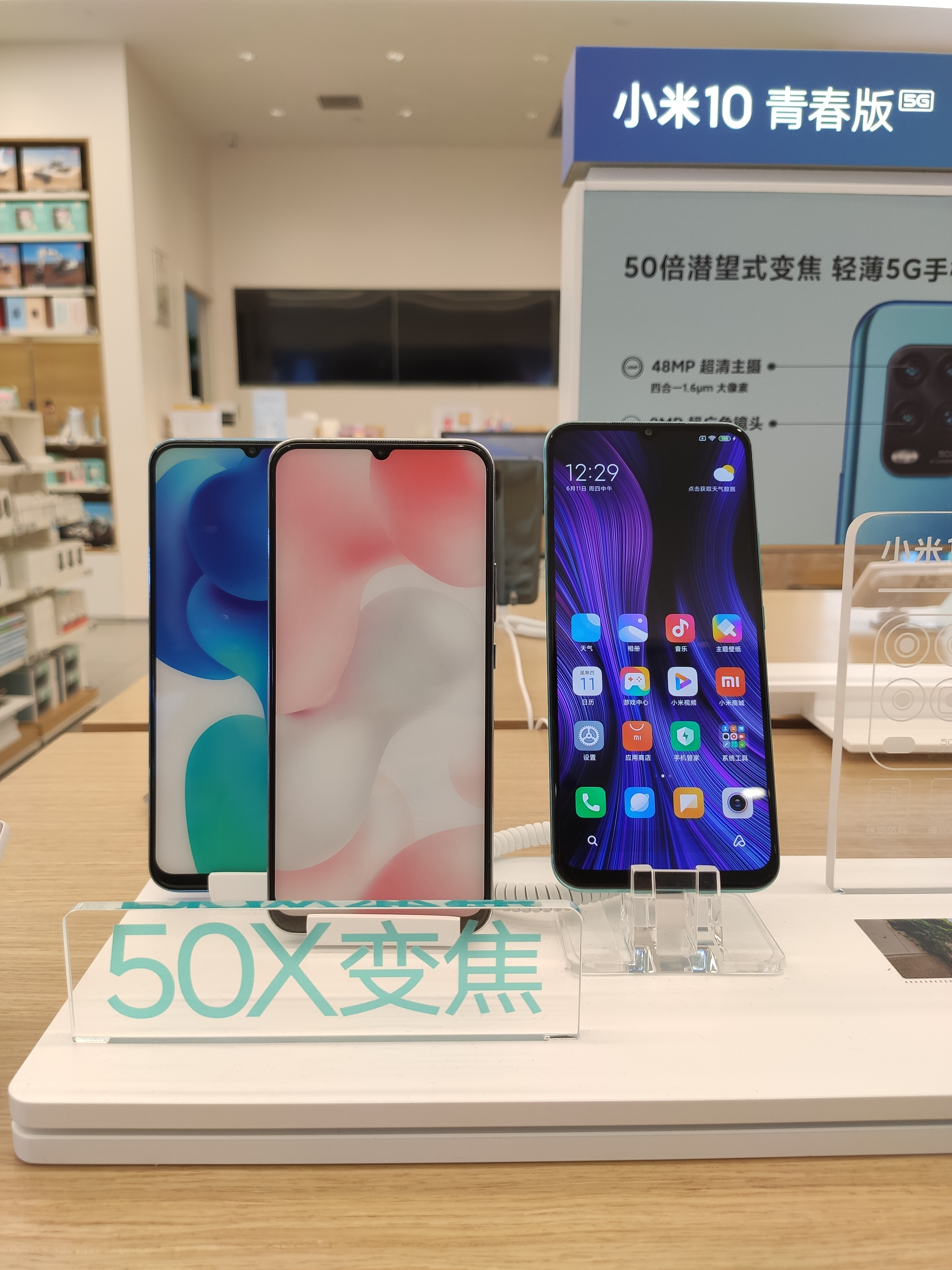
- Xiaomi Mi 10 Youth Edition
- Manufacturer: Xiaomi
- Type: Phablet
- Series: Mi
- First released: Mi 10 Lite 5G: March 27, 2020; 6 years ago Mi 10 Youth: April 27, 2020; 6 years ago
- Predecessor: Xiaomi Mi 9 Lite
- Successor: Xiaomi Mi 11 Lite
- Compatible networks: GSM, 3G, 4G (LTE), 5G
- Form factor: Slate
- Dimensions: Mi 10 Lite 5G: 163.91 × 74.77 × 7.98 mm Mi 10 Youth: 164.02 × 74.77 × 7.88 mm
- Weight: 192 g (7 oz)
- Operating system: Initial: Android 10 with MIUI 11; Current: Android 12 with MIUI 13
- System-on-chip: Qualcomm SDM765 Snapdragon 765G (7 nm)
- CPU: Octa-core (1x2.4 GHz Kryo 475 Prime & 1x2.2 GHz Kryo 475 Gold & 6x1.8 GHz Kryo 475 Silver)
- GPU: Adreno 620
- Memory: 6/8 GB LPDDR4X
- Storage: 64/128/256 GB UFS 2.1
- Battery: Non-removable Li-Po 4160 mAh
- Charging: 20 W fast charging
- Rear camera: Wide: 48 MP, f/1.8, 26 mm, 1/2", 0.8 µm, PDAF; Periscope telephoto lens: Mi 10 Lite 5G: None; Mi 10 Youth: 8 MP, f/3.4, 122 mm, PDAF, OIS, 5x optical zoom; Ultrawide: 8 MP, f/2.2, 13 mm, 1/4", 1.12 µm Macro: 2 MP, f/2.4, 1.12 µm Depth sensor: Mi 10 Lite 5G: None; Mi 10 Youth: 2 MP, f/2.4; Other: Dual-LED flash, HDR, panorama Video: Mi 10 Lite 5G: 4K@30fps, 1080p@30/60/120/240/960fps, 720p@30/120/240/960fps; gyro-EIS; Mi 10 Youth: 4K@30fps, 1080p@30/60/120fps, 720p@30/120/240/960fps; gyro-EIS
- Front camera: 16 MP, f/2.5, (wide), 1 µm HDR, panorama Video: 1080p@30fps
- Display: AMOLED, HDR10+, 6.57", 1080 × 2340 (FHD+), 19.5:9 ratio, 392 ppi
- Model: Mi 10 Lite 5G: M2002J9G, M2002J9R, M2002J9S, XIG01; Mi 10 Youth: M2002J9E
- Made in: China

The Xiaomi Mi 10 Lite 5G is a mid-range Android smartphone manufactured by Xiaomi, positioned as a simplified version of the Xiaomi Mi 10. It was announced on March 27, 2020, alongside the global models of the Xiaomi Mi 10 and Mi 10 Pro. On April 27, 2020, in China, alongside a new version of the MIUI 12 skin, the Xiaomi Mi 10 Youth Edition (also known as the Xiaomi Mi 10 Lite Zoom Edition) was presented, which is a variant of the Mi 10 Lite 5G for the Chinese market featuring a periscope telephoto lens.

== Design ==
The front panel is made of Corning Gorilla Glass 5, while the back panel and frame are made of glossy plastic.

On the back, the smartphones feature an atypical design for Xiaomi devices. The Mi 10 Youth Edition, unlike the Mi 10 Lite 5G, has a reduced thickness of 7.88 mm compared to 7.98 mm on the Mi 10 Lite 5G.

The bottom houses a USB-C port, speaker, microphone, and a dual-SIM card tray. The top features a 3.5 mm audio jack, a secondary microphone, and an infrared port. The volume rocker and power button are located on the right side.

The Mi 10 Lite 5G was available in three colors: Twilight Grey, Aurora Blue, and Dream White.

The Xiaomi Mi 10 Youth Edition was sold in five colors: Licorice Black (grey), Berry Blue (blue), Peppermint Green, Tangy Orange, and Peach Pink.

== Specifications ==
=== Hardware ===
The smartphones are powered by the mid-range Qualcomm Snapdragon 765G system-on-chip with 5G support. The Mi 10 Lite 5G was sold in configurations of 6/64, 6/128, and 8/256 GB, while the Mi 10 Youth Edition was available in 6/64, 6/128, 8/128, and 8/256 GB.

The battery has a capacity of 4160 mAh and supports 20 W fast charging.

The devices feature a 6.57-inch AMOLED display with a resolution of Full HD+ (2340 × 1080), a pixel density of 392 ppi, an aspect ratio of 19.5:9, HDR10+ support, and a teardrop notch. An optical fingerprint scanner is integrated beneath the display.

The Mi 10 Lite 5G features a rear quad-camera setup consisting of a 48 MP wide-angle lens with an aperture of f/1.8 and phase-detection autofocus (PDAF), an 8 MP ultrawide lens with an aperture of f/2.2, and a 2 MP macro lens alongside a 2 MP depth sensor, both with an aperture of f/2.4. In place of the depth sensor, the Mi 10 Youth Edition includes an 8 MP periscope telephoto lens with an aperture of f/3.4, PDAF, optical image stabilization, 5x optical zoom, and 50x hybrid zoom. Both models feature a 16 MP wide-angle front-facing camera with an aperture of f/2.5. The main camera can record video in 4K at 30fps, while the front camera records in 1080p at 30fps.

=== Software ===
The smartphones were released running MIUI 11 based on Android 10 and were later updated to MIUI 13 based on Android 12.
