= Xiaomi 12 Lite =

Mid-range Android smartphone released in 2022

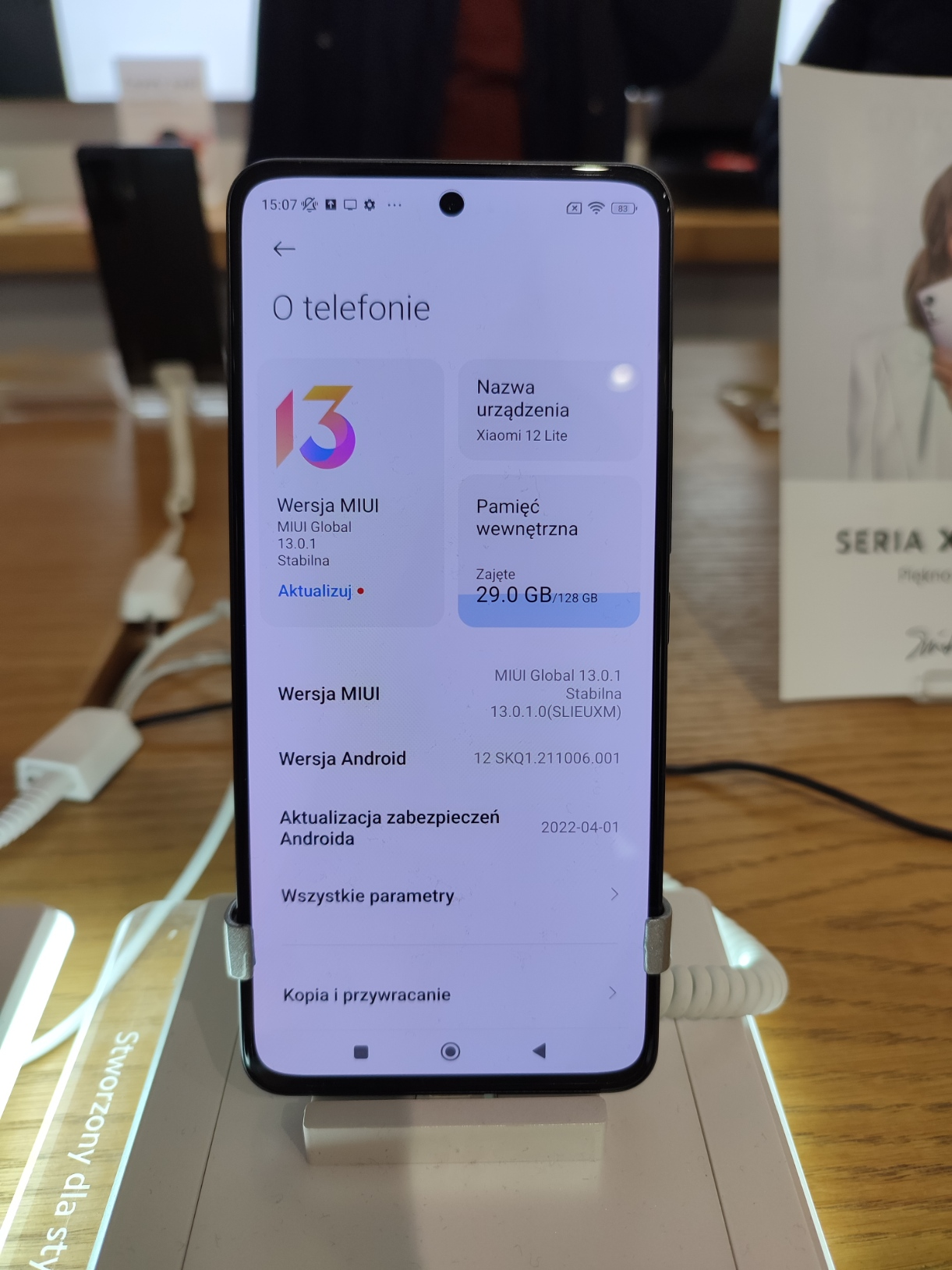
- Front view of the Xiaomi 12 Lite
- Manufacturer: Xiaomi
- Type: Phablet
- Series: Xiaomi
- First released: July 9, 2022; 3 years ago
- Predecessor: Xiaomi Mi 11 Lite
- Successor: Xiaomi 13 Lite
- Related: Xiaomi 12
- Compatible networks: GSM, 3G, 4G (LTE), 5G
- Form factor: Slate
- Dimensions: 159.3×73.7×7.29 mm (6.272×2.902×0.287 in)
- Weight: 173 g (6 oz)
- Operating system: Original: Android 12 with MIUI 13; Current: Android 14 with Xiaomi HyperOS
- System-on-chip: Qualcomm SM7325 Snapdragon 778G 5G (6 nm)
- CPU: Octa-core (4x2.4 GHz Kryo 670 & 4x1.8 GHz Kryo 670)
- GPU: Adreno 642L
- Memory: 6 GB or 8 GB LPDDR4X
- Storage: 128 GB or 256 GB UFS 2.2
- Battery: Non-removable, Li-Po 4300 mAh
- Charging: 67W fast charging
- Rear camera: 108 MP, f/1.8, 26mm (wide), 1/1.52", 0.7µm, PDAF; 8 MP, f/2.2, 119˚ (ultrawide), 1/4", 1.12µm 2 MP, f/2.4 (macro); LED flash, HDR, panorama Video: 4K@30fps, 1080p@30/60/120fps; gyro-EIS
- Front camera: 32 MP, f/2.5, 26mm (wide), 1/2.8", 0.7µm, AF; HDR, panorama Video: 1080p@30/60fps, 720p@120fps
- Display: AMOLED, 120Hz, HDR10+, 6.55 inches, 2400 × 1080 pixels (FHD+), 20:9 ratio, 402 ppi
- Sound: Stereo speakers
- Connectivity: USB-C 2.0, Bluetooth 5.2 (A2DP, LE), NFC, Infrared port, Wi-Fi 802.11 a/b/g/n/ac/6 (dual-band, Wi-Fi Direct), GPS (A-GPS), GLONASS, BeiDou, Galileo, QZSS, NavIC
- Data inputs: Touchscreen, 2 microphones, optical under-display fingerprint sensor, ambient light sensor, accelerometer, gyroscope, compass
- Model: 2203129G
- Codename: taoyao
- Development status: Available until end-of-support on July 1, 2026
- Other: Virtual proximity sensing

The Xiaomi 12 Lite is a mid-range smartphone developed by Xiaomi. Serving as a sub-flagship variant of the Xiaomi 12, it is marketed primarily for its design and camera capabilities. The device was officially announced on July 9, 2022.

The 12 Lite was also released at the launch event at Kuala Lumpur in Malaysia and in the Philippines on August 18, 2022.

== Design ==
The front display is protected by Corning Gorilla Glass 5, while the rear panel and the frame are constructed from matte plastic.

While its styling echoes the flagship Xiaomi 12 series, the 12 Lite features a transparent camera housing along with a completely flat front panel, back glass, and side edges.

The bottom of the phone houses a USB-C port, main loudspeaker, microphone, and a dual SIM card slot. The top features a secondary microphone, an secondary speaker, and an infrared port. The volume rocker and power button are located on the right side.

The Xiaomi 12 Lite was made available in three color options: Black, Lite Pink, and Lite Green.

== Specifications ==
=== Hardware ===
The Xiaomi 12 Lite is powered by the Qualcomm Snapdragon 778G system on a chip, matching its predecessor, the Xiaomi 11 Lite 5G NE. The device was launched with memory and storage configurations of 6 GB or 8 GB of LPDDR4X RAM paired with 128 GB or 256 GB of UFS 2.2 internal storage.

It features a 4300 mAh battery which supports 67W fast charging.

The device features a 6.55-inch AMOLED display with a Full HD+ resolution (2400 × 1080), a 402 ppi pixel density, and a 20:9 aspect ratio. The screen supports a 120Hz refresh rate and HDR10+, and includes a centered punch-hole cutout for the front-facing camera. An optical fingerprint scanner is integrated beneath the display.

For photography, the Xiaomi 12 Lite features a triple rear camera array consisting of a 108 MP wide-angle lens with an f/1.8 aperture and phase-detection autofocus (PDAF), an 8 MP ultra wide angle lens with an f/2.2 aperture, and a 2 MP macro lens with an f/2.4 aperture. The front-facing camera utilizes a 32 MP wide-angle sensor with an f/2.5 aperture and autofocus support. The rear setup can record video up to 4K at 30fps, while the front camera supports video capture up to 1080p at 60fps.

The audio system consists of dual stereo speakers mounted on the top and bottom frames with support for Dolby Atmos.

=== Software ===
The smartphone originally shipped with MIUI 13 based on Android 12. It was subsequently updated to Xiaomi HyperOS based on Android 14 with a new update to HyperOS 2.0 in October 2024.

Software update history
	OS	UI	Date
1st	Android 12	MIUI 13	July 2022
2nd	Android 13	MIUI 14	January 2023
3rd	Android 14	HyperOS	March 2024
4th	Android 14	HyperOS 2.0	October 2024
End of support: July 1, 2026

== See also ==
- Xiaomi 12
