= Xiaomi Mi 10 =

2020 Smartphones manufactured by Xiaomi

Xiaomi Mi 10 Xiaomi Mi 10 Pro
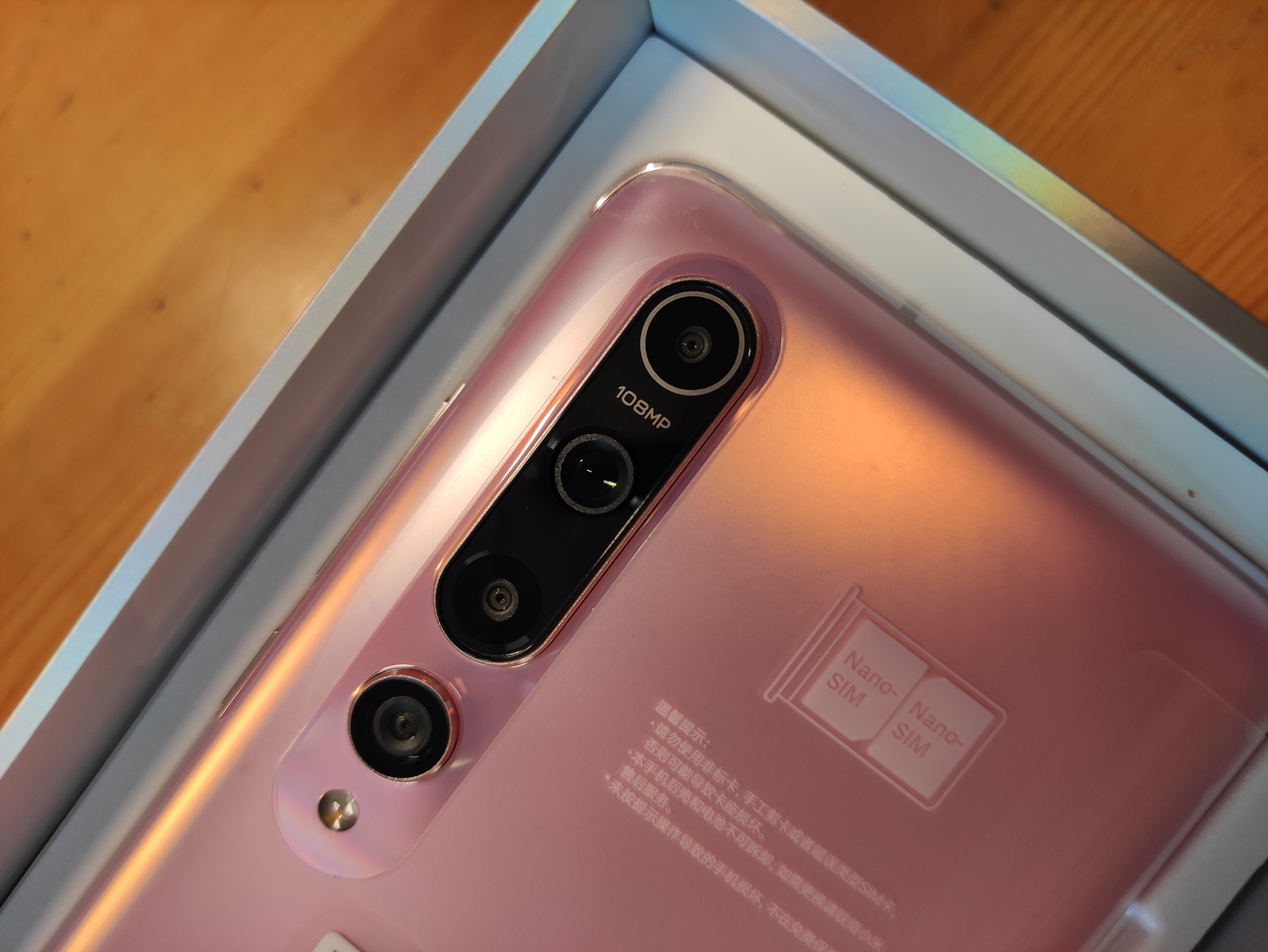
- Mi 10
- Manufacturer: Xiaomi
- Type: Phablet
- Series: Mi
- First released: 14 February 2020; 6 years ago (Mi 10); 18 February 2020; 6 years ago (Mi 10 Pro)
- Predecessor: Xiaomi Mi 9, Xiaomi Mi 9 Pro
- Successor: Xiaomi 11; Xiaomi 11 Pro
- Related: Xiaomi Mi 10 Ultra; Xiaomi Mi 10T; Xiaomi Mi 10S; Xiaomi Mi 10 Lite
- Compatible networks: 2G, 3G, 4G, 4G LTE, 5G
- Form factor: Slate
- Dimensions: 162.6 mm (6.40 in) H; 74.8 mm (2.94 in) W; 9 mm (0.35 in) D
- Weight: 208 g (7.3 oz)
- Operating system: Original: MIUI 11 based on Android 10; Current: Xiaomi HyperOS 1 based on Android 13
- System-on-chip: Qualcomm Snapdragon 865
- CPU: Octa-core Kryo 585 (1× 2.84 GHz + 3× 2.42 GHz + 4× 1.8 GHz)
- GPU: Adreno 650
- Memory: 8 GB or 12 GB LPDDR5 RAM
- Storage: Mi 10: 128 GB or 256 GB; Mi 10 Pro: 256 GB or 512 GB
- Removable storage: None
- Battery: 4780 mAh (Mi 10); 4500 mAh (Mi 10 Pro)
- Rear camera: Mi 10: 108 MP, f/1.7, 1/1.33", 0.8 μm (wide) + 13 MP, f/2.4, 12mm (ultrawide) + 2 MP, f/2.4 (macro) + 2 MP, f/2.4 (depth), dual-LED dual-tone flash, 1080p@30/60fps; Mi 10 Pro: 108 MP, f/1.7, 1/1.33", 0.8 μm (wide) + 20 MP, f/2.2, 13mm (ultrawide) + 12 MP, f/2.0, 1/2.55", 1.4 μm, 2× optical zoom (portrait) + 8 MP, f/2.0, 1.0 μm, 10× hybrid optical zoom (telephoto), Laser AF, dual pixel PDAF, triple-LED dual-tone flash, 1080p@30/60/120/240/960fps; Both: PDAF, OIS, HDR, panorama, gyro-EIS, 8K@30fps, 4K@30/60fps
- Front camera: 20 MP (f/2.0, 0.9 μm, 1/3"), 1080p@30fps (Mi 10), 1080p@30fps, 720p@120fps (Mi 10 Pro)
- Display: 6.67 inches, 1080 x 2340 pixels (2.5 MP), (386 ppi), Super AMOLED touchscreen, 16M colors HDR10+ DCI-P3; 90Hz refresh rate
- Connectivity: Wi-Fi 802.11a/b/g/n/ac (2.4 & 5GHz), dual-band, WiFi Direct, DLNA, hotspot Bluetooth V5.1, A2DP, Low-energy, aptX HD
- Model: Mi 10: M2001J2C, M2001J2E, M2001J2G, M2001J2I; Mi 10 Pro: M2001J1C, M2001J1E, M2001J1G; Mi 10S: M2102J2SC
- Codename: Mi 10: umi Mi 10 Pro: cmi Mi 10S: thyme
- Website: Official website

The Xiaomi Mi 10 and Xiaomi Mi 10 Pro are high-end Android smartphones developed by Xiaomi Inc. It is the Xiaomi's first high-end smartphone and announced on 13 February 2020.

== Specifications ==
=== Design ===
The Mi 10 and Mi 10 Pro use an aluminum frame and Gorilla Glass 5 on the front and rear. The display is curved and larger than the Mi 9; a circular cutout in the upper left hand corner for the front-facing camera replaces the Mi 9's notch. The camera module resembles the Mi CC9 Pro/Mi Note 10 with the accent ring from the Mi 9 around the top sensor, although the flash is located below in place of the macro sensor. The bottom sensor is likewise separate from the main camera array, and both protrude slightly. The Mi 10 is available in Ice Blue, Peach Gold and Titanium Silver, while the Mi 10 Pro is available in Pearl White and Starry Blue.

=== Hardware ===
The Xiaomi Mi 10 and Mi 10 Pro are powered by the Qualcomm Snapdragon 865 processor, with the Adreno 650 GPU. They have a 6.67-inch (169 mm) FHD+ Super AMOLED display at a 90 Hz refresh rate with HDR10+ support. There is an optical (in-display) fingerprint scanner as well. Both have 8 GB or 12 GB LPDDR5 RAM, and 128 GB, 256 GB or 512 GB of non-expandable UFS 3.0. The Mi 10's battery is 4780 mAh and the Mi 10 Pro's is slightly smaller at 4500 mAh. The devices can be recharged over USB-C at up to 30 W for the Mi 10 and 50 W for the Mi 10 Pro, and can also charge wirelessly at up to 30 W with reverse charging at 10 W. The Mi 10 and Mi 10 Pro feature quad camera setups. While both come with a 108 MP wide sensor, the Mi 10 has a 13 MP ultrawide sensor and 2 MP macro and depth sensors, while the Mi 10 Pro has a 20 MP ultrawide sensor, a 12 MP portrait sensor and an 8 MP telephoto sensor. Both are capable of recording video at 8K resolution. The front-facing camera on both devices uses a 20 MP sensor.

=== Software ===
The devices run on Android 10, with Xiaomi's custom MIUI 11 skin. Later they were updated to MIUI 13 based on Android 12.

As of 2024, the Mi 10 and Mi 10 Pro received Xiaomi HyperOS based on Android 13.

== Reception ==
DXOMARK gave the Mi 10 Pro's camera an overall score of 124, with a photo score of 134 and a video score of 104, ranking it as their best smartphone camera at the time.
