= Xiaomi Civi 3 =

Android-based smartphone manufactured by Xiaomi Inc.

- Manufacturer: Xiaomi
- Type: Phablet
- Series: Civi
- First released: May 25, 2023; 3 years ago
- Predecessor: Xiaomi Civi 2
- Successor: Xiaomi Civi 4 Pro
- Compatible networks: GSM, 3G, 4G (LTE), 5G
- Form factor: Slate
- Colors: Rose Purple, Adventure Gold, Mint Green, Coconut Ash, Disney 100th Anniversary Limited Edition
- Dimensions: 158.75×71.7×7.56 mm (6.250×2.823×0.298 in)
- Weight: 173.5 g (6.12 oz)
- Operating system: Initial: Android 13 + MIUI 14; Current: Android 15 + Xiaomi HyperOS 2
- System-on-chip: MediaTek Dimensity 8200 Ultra (4 nm)
- CPU: 8 cores (1×3.1GHz Cortex-A78 & 3×3.0GHz Cortex-A78 & 4×2.0GHz Cortex-A55)
- GPU: Mali-G610 MC6
- Memory: 12/16 GB; LPDDR5
- Storage: 128/256 GB, 1 TB; UFS 3.1
- SIM: Dual Nano-SIM
- Battery: Non-removable, Li-Po 4500 mAh
- Charging: 67W fast charging, 100% in 38 minutes (advertised), Power Delivery 3.0
- Rear camera: 50 Mp Sony IMX800, f/1.8, 23 mm (wide-angle lens), 1/1.49", 1 μm, PDAF, OIS + 8 Mp Sony IMX355, f/2.2, 115˚ (ultra-wide), 1/4.0", 1.12 μm + 2 Mp GalaxyCore GC02M1, f/2.4, (macro ) 4-LED dual-tone flash, HDR, panorama Video: 4K@30fps, 1080p@30/60/120fps, 720p@960fps; gyro-EIS
- Front camera: 32 Mp, f/2.0, 26 mm, 78° (wide-angle), 1/2.8", 0.8 μm, AF + 32 Mp, f/2.4, 100° (ultra-wide), 1/2.74", 0.8 μm 2-LED dual-tone flash, HDR, panorama Video: 4K@30fps, 1080p@30/60fps
- Display: AMOLED, 6.55", 2400 × 1080 (FullHD+), 20:9, 402 ppi, 120 Hz, HDR10+
- Sound: Stereo Speakers
- Connectivity: USB-C 2.0, Bluetooth 5.3 (A2DP, LE), NFC, IR port, Wi-Fi 802.11 a/b/g/n/ac/6 (dual-band, Wi-Fi Direct, hotspot), GPS, A-GPS, GLONASS, BDS, Galileo, QZSS
- Model: 23046PNC9C
- Codename: yuechu
- Other: Fingerprint scanner (under display, optical), proximity sensor, light sensor, accelerometer, gyroscope, compass, color temperature sensor
- Website: Official website (in Chinese)

The Xiaomi Civi 3 is a youth smartphone developed and manufactured by Xiaomi. It was announced on May 25, 2023.

== Design ==
The screen is protected by the curved Corning Gorilla Glass 5. The back is made of curved glossy glass and the frame is made of matte plastic.

The USB-C port, speaker, microphone and a Dual SIM tray are located on the bottom. On top are the second microphone and IR port. On the right side are the volume rocker and the power button.

Xiaomi Civi 3 is sold in 4 colors: Rose Purple, Adventure Gold, Mint Green and Coconut Ash (grey). In all color options except Coconut Ash, the top half of the back is lighter and the bottom is darker.

== Specifications ==
=== Platform ===
The smartphone features the MediaTek Dimensity 8200 Ultra SoC with Mali-G610 MC6 GPU.

=== Battery ===
Civi 3 has a 4500 mAh battery and 67W fast charging support.

=== Camera ===
The device featureas a rear triple camera with a 50 MP, f/1.8 (wide-angle) with phase autofocus + 8 MP, f/2.2 (ultrawide-angle) with an angle of 115° + 2 MP, f/2.4 (macro). The smartphone also received a dual front camera 32 Mp, f/2.0 (wide-angle) with a viewing angle of 78° and autofocus + 32 Mp, f/2.4 (ultrawide-angle) with a viewing angle of 100°. The main and front cameras can record video in 4K@30fps resolution. In addition, smartphones received two frontal LED flashes.

=== Screen ===
Screen AMOLED, 6.55", FullHD+ (2400 × 1080) with a pixel density of 402 ppi, an aspect ratio of 20:9, a display refresh rate of 120 Hz, support for HDR10+ and a pill-shaped cut-out for the dual front-facing camera, which is placed on top in the middle. Also, an optical fingerprint scanner is mounted under the display.

=== Sound ===
The device has mono speaker.

=== Memory ===
Xiaomi Civi 3 is sold in 12 GB/256 GB and 12 GB/512 GB and 16 GB/1 TB. RAM type LPDDR5, and storage — UFS 3.1.

=== Software ===
The smartphone is released with MIUI 14 based on Android 13. Later, it was updated to Xiaomi HyperOS 2 based on Android 15.

== Xiaomi Civi 3 Disney 100th Anniversary Limited Edition ==
The Xiaomi Civi 3 Disney 100th Anniversary Limited Edition is a special edition of the Xiaomi Civi 3 dedicated to the 100th anniversary of The Walt Disney Company. This edition differs from the regular model in the back panel design, a stylized box, SIM ejection tool, stickers, UI theme and effects, and stickers in the gallery editor. It was sold in 12/512 GB memory configuration.
