= Xiaomi 12 =

Smartphones manufactured by Xiaomi

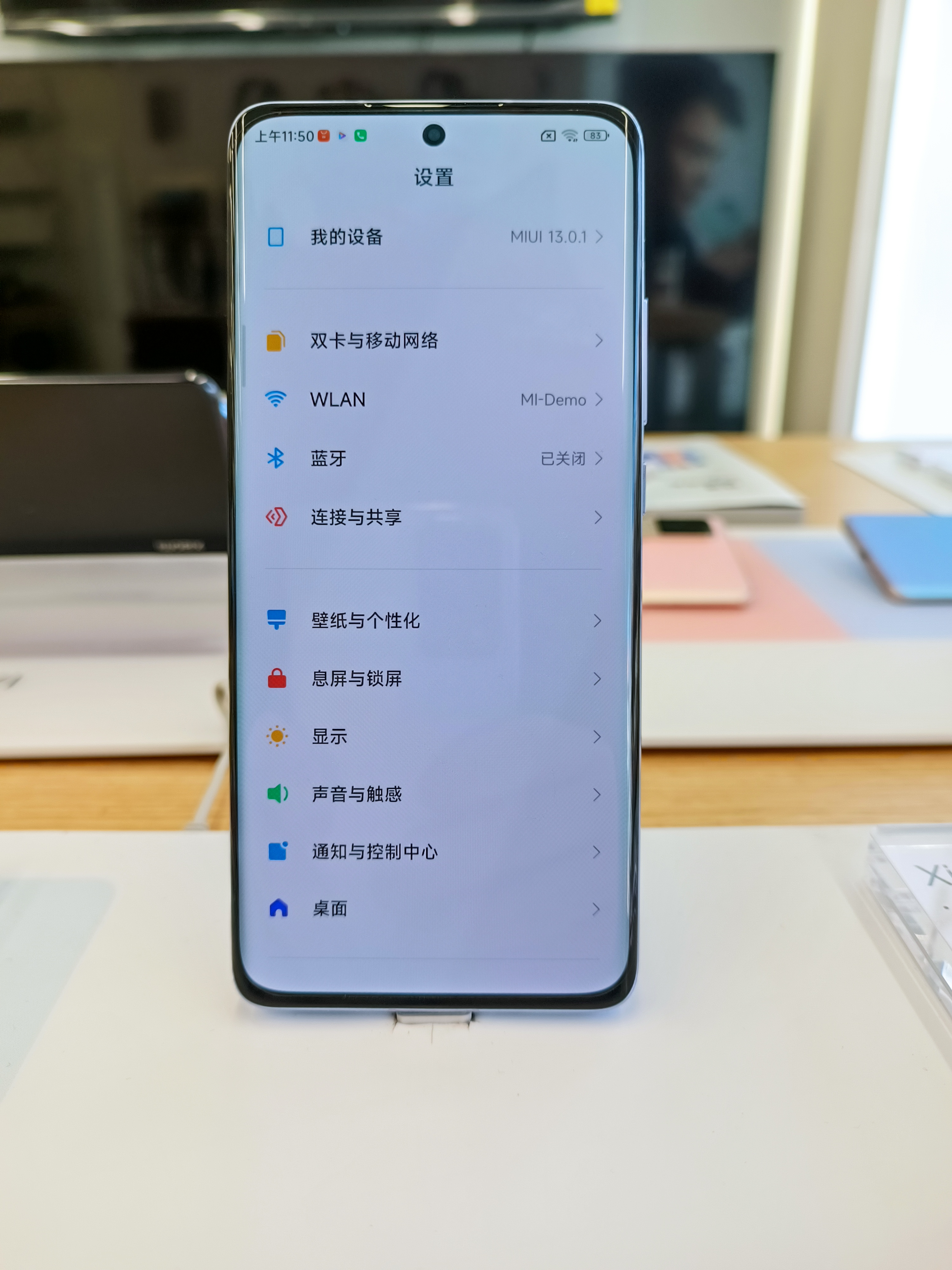
- Front of Xiaomi 12
- Manufacturer: Xiaomi
- Type: 12/12X: smartphone 12 Pro/Pro Dimensity: phablet
- Series: Xiaomi
- First released: 12/12X/Pro: December 28, 2021; 4 years ago 12 Pro Dimensity: July 4, 2022; 4 years ago
- Predecessor: Xiaomi Mi 11; Xiaomi Mi 11 Pro
- Successor: Xiaomi 13
- Related: Xiaomi 12S; Xiaomi 12S Pro; Xiaomi 12S Ultra; Xiaomi 12 Lite; Xiaomi Civi 1S; Xiaomi 12T; Xiaomi 12T Pro
- Compatible networks: GSM / CDMA / HSPA / CDMA2000 / LTE / 5G
- Form factor: Slate
- Colors: 12/12 Pro: Black, Blue, Purple, Green; 12X: Black, Blue, Purple; 12 Pro Dimensity: Black, Blue
- Dimensions: 12: 152.7 mm (6.01 in) H 69.9 mm (2.75 in) W 8.2 mm (0.32 in) (glass) or 8.7 mm (0.34 in) (leather) D; 12X: 152.7 mm (6.01 in) H 69.9 mm (2.75 in) W 8.2 mm (0.32 in); 12 Pro: 163.6 mm (6.44 in) H 74.6 mm (2.94 in) W 8.2 mm (0.32 in) (glass) or 8.7 mm (0.34 in) (leather) D; 12 Pro Dimensity: 163.6 mm (6.44 in) H 74.6 mm (2.94 in) W 8.2 mm (0.32 in)
- Weight: 12: 179 g (6.3 oz) (leather) or 180 g (6.3 oz) (glass); 12X: 176 g (6.2 oz); 12 Pro: 204 g (7.2 oz) (leather) or 205 g (7.2 oz) (glass); 12 Pro Dimensity: 201 g (7.1 oz)
- Operating system: Original: 12/Pro/Pro Dimensity: Android 12 with MIUI 13; 12X: Android 11 with MIUI 13; Current: 12/Pro: Android 15 with Xiaomi HyperOS 3; 12 Pro Dimensity: Android 14 with Xiaomi HyperOS 2; 12X: Android 13 with Xiaomi HyperOS
- System-on-chip: 12/Pro: Snapdragon 8 Gen 1 (4 nm); 12X: Snapdragon 870 (7 nm); 12 Pro Dimensity: MediaTek Dimensity 9000+ (4 nm)
- CPU: 12/Pro: Octa-core (1x3.00 GHz Cortex-X2 & 3x2.50 GHz Cortex-A710 & 4x1.80 GHz Cortex-A510); 12X: Octa-core (1x3.2 GHz Cortex-X2 & 3x2.42 GHz Kryo 585 & 4x1.80 GHz Kryo 585); 12 Pro Dimensity: Octa-core (1x3.20 GHz Cortex-X2 & 3x2.85 GHz Cortex-A710 & 4x1.80 GHz Cortex-A510)
- GPU: 12/Pro: Adreno 730; 12X: Adreno 650; 12 Pro Dimensity: Mali-G710 MC10
- Memory: 8 GB, 12 GB RAM
- Storage: 128 GB, 256 GB
- Removable storage: None
- SIM: Dual SIM (Nano-SIM, dual stand-by)
- Battery: 12/12X: 4500 mAh; 12 Pro: 4600 mAh; 12 Pro Dimensity: 5160 mAh
- Charging: 12/12X/Pro Dimensity: 67W (Xiaomi), 15W (USB PD (PPS)), 10W (USB PD (non-PPS)); 12 Pro: 120W (Xiaomi HyperCharge), 15W (USB PD (PPS)), 10W (USB PD (non-PPS))
- Rear camera: 12/12X/Pro Dimensity: 50 MP, f/1.9 (wide), 1/2", 0.8µm, PDAF, OIS 13 MP, 119° (ultrawide) 5 MP, f/2.4, (telemacro); 12 Pro: 50 MP, f/1.9, 24mm (wide), 1/1.28", 1.22µm, PDAF 50 MP, f/2.2, 120° (ultrawide) 50 MP, f/2.4, 48mm (Telephoto); All: HDR, panorama Video 12/12X/Pro: 8K@24fps, 4K@30/60fps, 1080p@30/60/120fps, 720p@960fps; gyro-EIS 12 Pro Dimensity: 4K@30/60fps, 1080p@30/60/120fps, 720p@960fps; gyro-EIS
- Front camera: 32 MP, f/2.5, (wide); 1080p@30/120fps
- Display: 12/12X: 6.2 in (160 mm) 12 Pro/Pro Dimensity:6.73 in (171 mm); 12 Pro/Pro Dimensity: 1440 x 3200 pixels, 20:9 ratio (~521 ppi density) 12/12X: 1080 x 2400 pixels, 20:9 ratio (~419 ppi density); All: Corning Gorilla Glass Victus OLED, 120Hz refresh rate, Dolby Vision, HDR10+, 1200 nits (peak)
- Sound: 12/12X: stereo speakers 12 Pro/Pro Dimensity: quad speakers All: Tuned by Harman Kardon
- Connectivity: Wi-Fi 802.11 a/b/g/n/ac/6, dual-band, Wi-Fi Direct, hotspot Bluetooth 5.2/5.3 (12 Pro Dimensity), A2DP, LE; A-GPS. Up to tri-band: GLONASS, BDS, GALILEO, QZSS, NavIC
- Data inputs: Multi-touch screen USB Type-C 2.0
- Water resistance: IP53
- Model: 12: 2201123C, 2201123G; 12X: 2112123AC, 2112123AG; 12 Pro: 2201122C, 2201122G; 12 Pro Dimensity: 2207122MC
- Codename: 12: cupid 12X: psyche 12 Pro: zeus 12 Pro Dimensity: damuier

The Xiaomi 12 is a line of Android-based smartphones manufactured by Xiaomi. It was launched on 28 December 2021.

The Xiaomi 12 Pro is a bigger and improved version of the Xiaomi 12, but with telephoto lens replaced telephoto macro on the Xiaomi 12. The Xiaomi 12X has similar to Xiaomi 12 specifications but with a less powerful chipset and a miss of wireless charging.

On 7 July 2022, alongside the Xiaomi 12S Series, the Xiaomi 12 Pro Dimensity was unveiled with the MediaTek Dimensity 9000+. It features the same camera setup as the base Xiaomi 12 model, bigger battery and less powerful charging support compared to the Xiaomi 12 Pro.

== Design ==
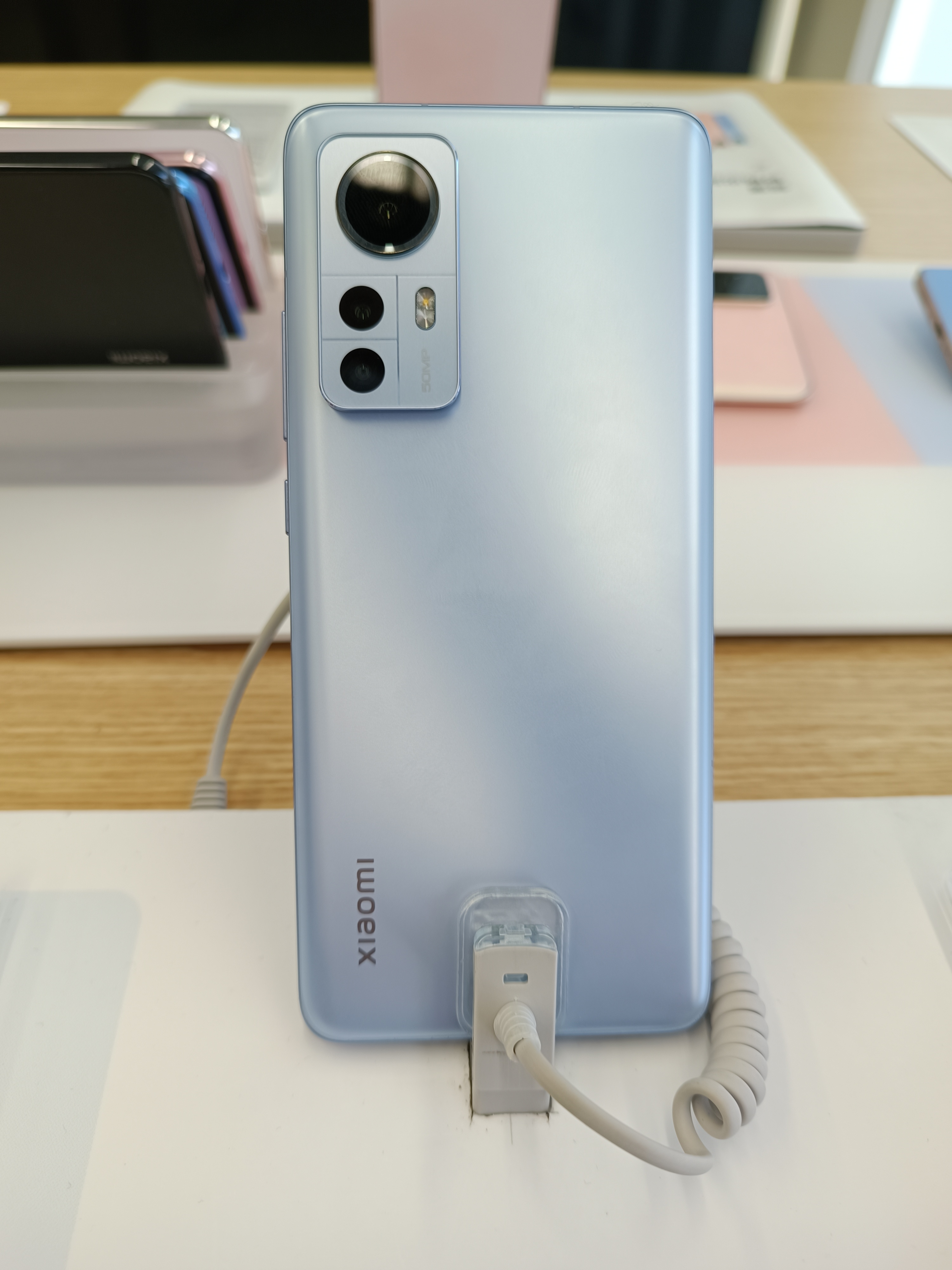
Back of Xiaomi 12 in blue color

The front is made of Corning Gorilla Glass Victus and the back is made of glass or eco-leather in green color option of Xiaomi 12 and 12 Pro. The frame is made of aluminium.

The design of all smartphones in the Xiaomi 12 Series is similar, but the Pro models have bigger dimensions (152.7 mm (6.01 in) × 69.9 mm (2.75 in) × 8.2 mm (0.32 in) in the Xiaomi 12 and 12X or 8.7 mm (0.34 in) leather version of the Xiaomi 12 and 163.6 mm (6.44 in) × 74.6 mm (2.94 in) × 8.2 mm (0.32 in) in the Xiaomi 12 Pro and 12 Pro Dimensity or 8.7 mm (0.34 in) leather version of the Xiaomi 12 Pro).

On the bottom side, there is a USB-C port, speaker, microphone, and dual SIM tray. On the top, there is an additional microphone, IR blaster, and a second speaker. On the right, there is the volume rocker and a power button.

The Xiaomi 12 and Xiaomi 12 Pro were available in 4 colors: Black, Blue, Purple, and Green (China exclusive).

The Xiaomi 12X was available in 3 colors: Black, Blue, and Purple.

The Xiaomi 12 Pro Dimensity was available in Black and Blue colors.

Color	Xiaomi 12	Xiaomi 12X	Xiaomi 12 Pro	Xiaomi 12 Pro Dimensity
	Yes	Yes	Yes	Yes
	Yes	Yes	Yes	Yes
	Yes	Yes	Yes	No
	Yes	No	Yes	No

== Specifications ==
=== Hardware ===
==== Platform ====
The Xiaomi 12 and 12 Pro are the second smartphones, after Motorola Edge X30, to receive the Qualcomm Snapdragon 8 Gen 1 SoC. Meanwhile, the Xiaomi 12X uses less powerful Qualcomm Snapdragon 870 instead of the Snapdragon 8 Gen 1, and the Xiaomi 12 Pro Dimensity is the first smartphone that features the MediaTek Dimensity 9000+.

=== Software ===
Initially, the Xiaomi 12 series was released with MIUI 13 based on Android 11 on the Xiaomi 12X and based on Android 12 on other models. Later, the Xiaomi 12X was updated to Xiaomi HyperOS based on Android 13, while the Xiaomi 12 and Xiaomi 12 Pro were updated to Xiaomi HyperOS 2 based on Android 15, and Xiaomi 12 Pro Dimensity was updated to Xiaomi HyperOS 2 based on Android 14.
