= Xiaomi 11 =

Android smartphone

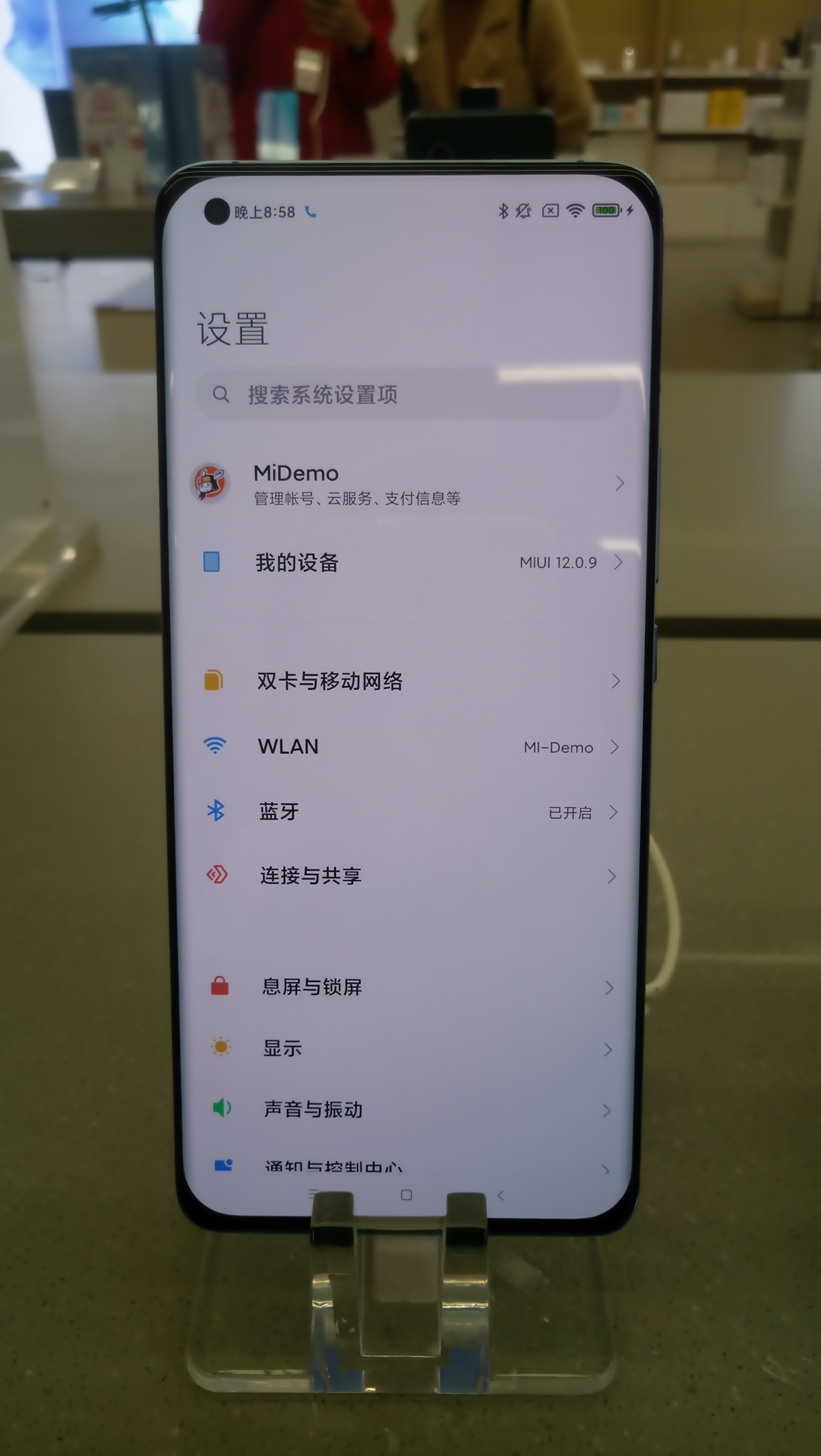
- The front of Xiaomi 11
- Also known as: Xiaomi Mi 11
- Manufacturer: Xiaomi
- Series: Mi
- First released: 28 December 2020; 5 years ago
- Predecessor: Xiaomi Mi 10
- Successor: Xiaomi 12
- Related: Xiaomi Mi 11 Ultra; Xiaomi Mi 11 Pro; Xiaomi Mi 11 Lite; Xiaomi Mi 11 Lite 5G; Xiaomi 11 Lite 5G NE; Xiaomi Civi; Xiaomi Mi 11X; Xiaomi Mi 11X Pro/Mi 11i Xiaomi 11T; Xiaomi 11i
- Compatible networks: LTE-FDD; LTE-TDD; WCDMA; GSM; 5G NR
- Form factor: Slate
- Dimensions: Height: 164.3 mm (6.47 inches); Width: 74.6 mm (2.94 inches); Thickness of glass plate: 8.06 mm (0.317 inches); Plain leather version thickness: 8.56 mm (0.337 inches)
- Operating system: Original: MIUI 12 based on Android 11; Current: Xiaomi HyperOS 2 based on Android 14
- System-on-chip: Qualcomm Snapdragon 888 (SM8350)
- CPU: Qualcomm® Kryo™ 680; 1x 2.84GHz+3×2.42GHz+4x 1.80GHz
- GPU: Qualcomm® Adreno™ 660 (840MHz)
- Memory: 8 GB or 12 GB LPDDR5-6400 RAM
- Storage: 128/256GB UFS 3.1
- Removable storage: None
- Battery: 4600mah; not removable
- Rear camera: Main lens: Samsung S5KHMX 1/1.33 inch 0.8μ (four to one 1.6μ) 108 million pixels F/1.85; Ultra-wide-angle lens: OmniVision Technologies OV13B10 123° wide-angle 13 million pixels F/2.4; Telephoto macro lens: Samsung S5K5E9 5 million pixels
- Front camera: Samsung S5K3T2 20 million pixels
- Display: 3200×1440 3K (4.6 MP) AMOLED flexible screen; 6.81 inches; HDR10+; DCI-P3; 120 Hz refresh rate
- Sound: Stereo speakers tuned by Harman Kardon, lower main microphone, upper noise reduction microphone
- Connectivity: Wi-Fi 802.11a/b/g/n/ac/6 (2.4 & 5GHz), dual-band, WiFi Direct, hotspot Bluetooth V5.2, A2DP, Low-energy, aptX HD, aptX Adaptive
- Data inputs: Capacitive touch screen, volume button, power button, up and down microphones, distance sensor, ambient light sensor, acceleration sensor, gyroscope, electronic compass, X-axis linear motor, holding position sensor, tri-frequency satellite GNSS
- Model: M2011K2C, M2011K2G
- Codename: venus
- Other: Face recognition, screen fingerprint recognition, QC 4+/QC3+/PD3.0 55w wired fast charging, 50w wireless fast charging, 10w wireless reverse charging
- Website: https://www.mi.com/global/product/mi-11/

The Xiaomi 11 is an Android-based high-end smartphone developed by Xiaomi Inc. It was introduced as the successor to the Xiaomi 10 series and serves as the flagship model in the Xiaomi 11 lineup. The device features upgraded hardware specifications, including a high-resolution display and improved camera system, aimed at competing with other premium smartphones. The Xiaomi 11 was first unveiled in China in December 2020 and launched globally on 8 February 2021.

== Hardware ==
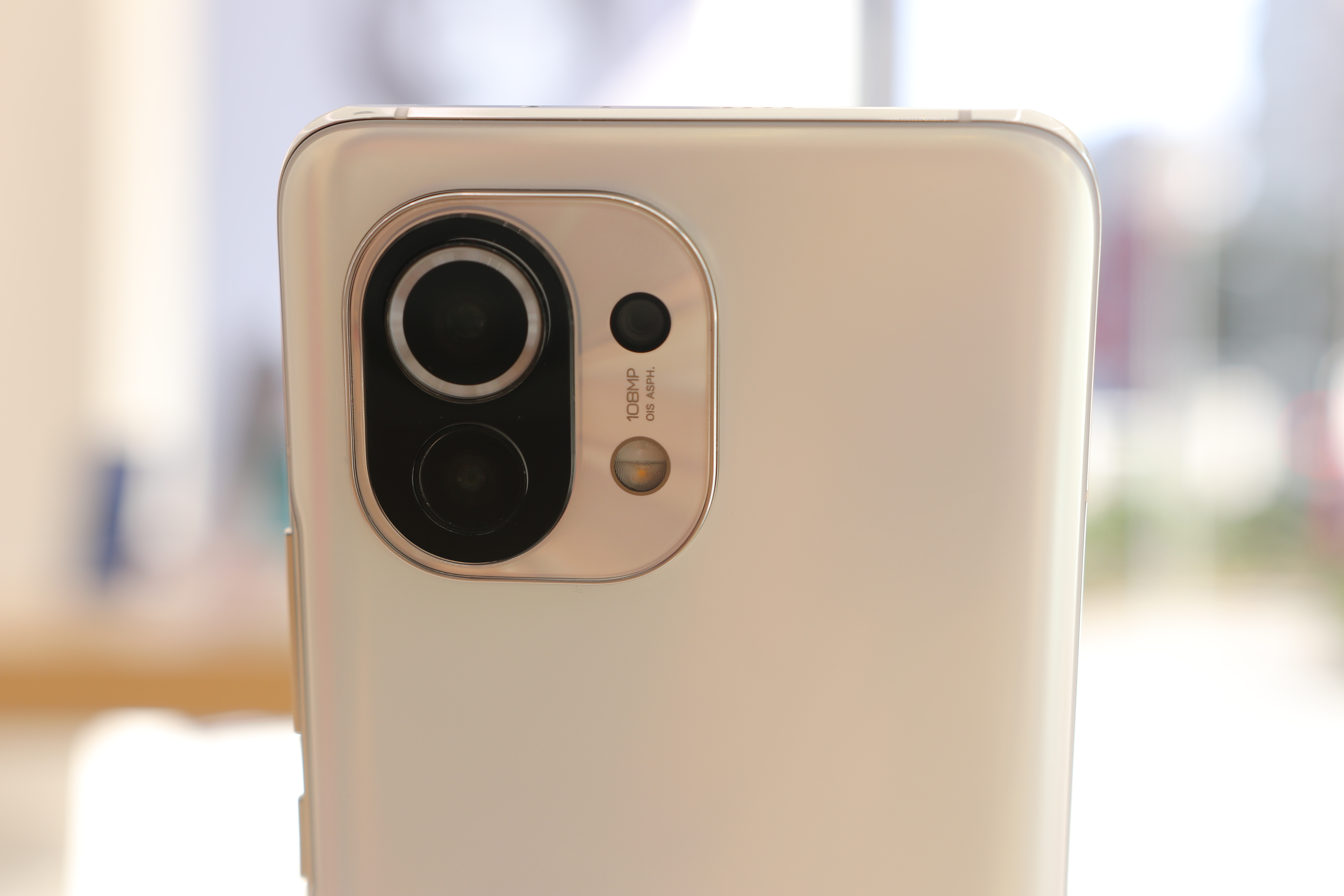
Mi 11 Rear Cameras

=== Design ===
The design of the Xiaomi Mi 11 is similar to the Mi 10, maintaining the front camera design in the upper left corner. The Xiaomi 11 uses Corning Gorilla Glass Victus on its display and Corning Gorilla Glass 5, or vegan leather, on its back. The front of the phone uses a hidden earpiece. The back of the phone has two material designs and five available colours: black, white, blue, smokey purple, and brown. The first three use anti-glare glass and the latter two use vegan leather. Due to the varying materials, the thickness and weight of the device are also different. The anti-glare frosted glass version is 8.06 mm thick and weighs 196 g, and the vegan leather version is 8.56 mm thick and weighs 194 g.

The side frame of the Xiaomi 11 is made of an aluminum alloy, and there is a communication antenna overflow band around the fuselage, which is plastic injection molded with a colour similar to the frame. The upper part of the frame is equipped with a noise-reduction microphone, an infrared emission window, and a top sub-speaker (integrated earpiece function). The right side is equipped with plus and minus volume buttons and a switch screen/power button. The lower part is equipped with a SIM card slot and ejection jack, a USB Type-C interface, and the main speaker openings. The frame is slightly wider near the control buttons.

The back of the Xiaomi 11 is made of AG-processed glass or leather-like polycarbonate plastic. The glass-based version of the back cover is about 2 g heavier than the polycarbonate version, but the total thickness is reduced by 0.5 mm. The upper left corner of the back cover contains the rear camera group area, which is contained in a rounded rectangle. The left side of the camera area is a Nascar racetrack-shaped black area, with the main camera sensor placed on the upper part and the wide-angle sensor on the lower part. There is a bright silver ring on the periphery of the main camera sensor opening, which is slightly protruding and is similar to the design of Mi 9, Mi CC9 and other models. The right side of the racetrack-shaped area is a silver area; from top to bottom, the long-focus macro sensor, LED fill light and auxiliary ambient light sensor are arranged. In the lower-left corner of the fuselage, the "XIAOMI" logo of the Xiaomi Group, which is the same as the Xiaomi CC9 series, replaces the previous "MI" logo. The plain leather version also has a metal circular decoration under the logo, which also serves as a fixed leather laminate.

=== Screen ===
The Xiaomi 11 uses a 6.81-inch (17.3 cm) flexible AMOLED display provided by Samsung Display, which is Samsung's fourth-generation AMOLED substrate (E4). It has a diamond-shaped sub-pixel arrangement and has a resolution of 3200 by 1440. The pixel density (PPI) is 515. It supports up to 1771nit of peak brightness and 996nit of full-screen brightness, as tested by Display Mate, and supports DCI-P3 color gamut.

The screen glass of Xiaomi 11 uses Corning Gorilla Glass Victus.

=== Chip and Storage ===
The Xiaomi 11 uses the Qualcomm Snapdragon 888 SoC.

The CPU houses the Qualcomm Kryo 680 architecture, consisting of a large core with a main frequency of 2.84 GHz, three middle cores with a main frequency of 2.42 GHz, and four small cores of 1.8 GHz. The chip integrates an Adreno 660 GPU with a main frequency of 840 MHz It supports dual 5G SIM cards while staying on standby under the 5G network.

The device encapsulates 8GB or 12GB of LPDDR5 RAM above the SoC, with a main frequency of 3200 MHz, and optional storage of 128GB or 256GB. The specifications are all UFS 3.1, which is consistent with the Mi 10 Extreme Commemorative Edition.

=== Camera ===
For the rear camera, the Xiaomi 11 uses the Samsung Bright S5KHMX sensor that was used in some older models, with a 108MP resolution and an aperture of f/1.85. In addition to acting as the main camera in the Xiaomi 11, it also supports up to 30x digital zoom through cropping. Mi 11 output photo pixels are similar to the Mi 10, with 27 million pixels (pixel-binned 108-megapixel images). It can record video at 720P 30fps, 1080P 30/60fps, 4K 30/60fps, and AI 8K 24/30fps. In addition to normal video, it can also record interpolated slow-motion at 720P 120/480fps and 1080P 120/480fps.

The Xiaomi 11 is also equipped with a 13-megapixel ultra-wide-angle sensor (supplied by Omnivision Technologies, OV13B10), which supports wide-angle shooting up to 123°, an aperture of f/2.4, and can record video at 720P 30fps, 1080P 30/60fps, and 4K 30fps.

The device also sports a 5-megapixel telephoto macro camera (supplied by Samsung, S5K5E9) which has a focusing range of 10-3cm from the subject. This sensor is also able to record video at 720P 30fps and 1080P 30fps.

The front camera of the Xiaomi 11 uses the Samsung S5K3T2 sensor, which is also used in the Xiaomi Mi 10 series and Redmi K20/30 series, with a pixel count of 20 million. It supports 1080P 30/60fps and 720P 30fps video recording.

=== Other ===
The Xiaomi 11 supports wired charging with a power of up to 55W (11V 5A MAX), wireless charging with a power of 50W, and reverse wireless charging with a power of up to 10W, which can charge other devices that support wireless charging. However, the Chinese version of the Xiaomi 11 does not come with a charger. In certain regions, the standard version arrives with no charger, but a version with a 55 W GaN charger is also available at no extra cost. The global version comes with a 55W GaN charger, charging cable, plastic screen protector, translucent plastic case, and SIM ejector tool in the box.

The phone uses stereo speakers, but the symmetrical stereo speakers used on the Mi 10 have been changed to asymmetrical stereo speakers. The top sound unit is slightly smaller than the bottom and also functions as an earpiece. In addition, the 3.5mm audio output and input interface have been removed. The 3.5mm standard connector can only be converted using a USB Type-C to 3.5mm audio cable conversion cable.

The phone also supports Bluetooth 5.2, multi-function NFC, and infrared remote control functions. Remote control apps can control electrical equipment that supports infrared control.

== Software ==
The Xiaomi 11 uses the MIUI 12 operating system based on Android 11. The device was later updated to Xiaomi HyperOS 2 based on Android 14

== Mi 11 Ultra / Mi 11 Pro / Mi 11 Lite 5G and Mi 11 Lite / Xiaomi 11 Lite 5G NE ==
Along with the Xiaomi 11, Xiaomi also released the Mi 11 Ultra and Mi 11 Pro in China on 29 March 2021 and globally in April 2021. Alongside those, Xiaomi also launched Mi 11 Lite 5G and Mi 11 Lite, and the Xiaomi 11 Lite 5G NE due to chip shortages.

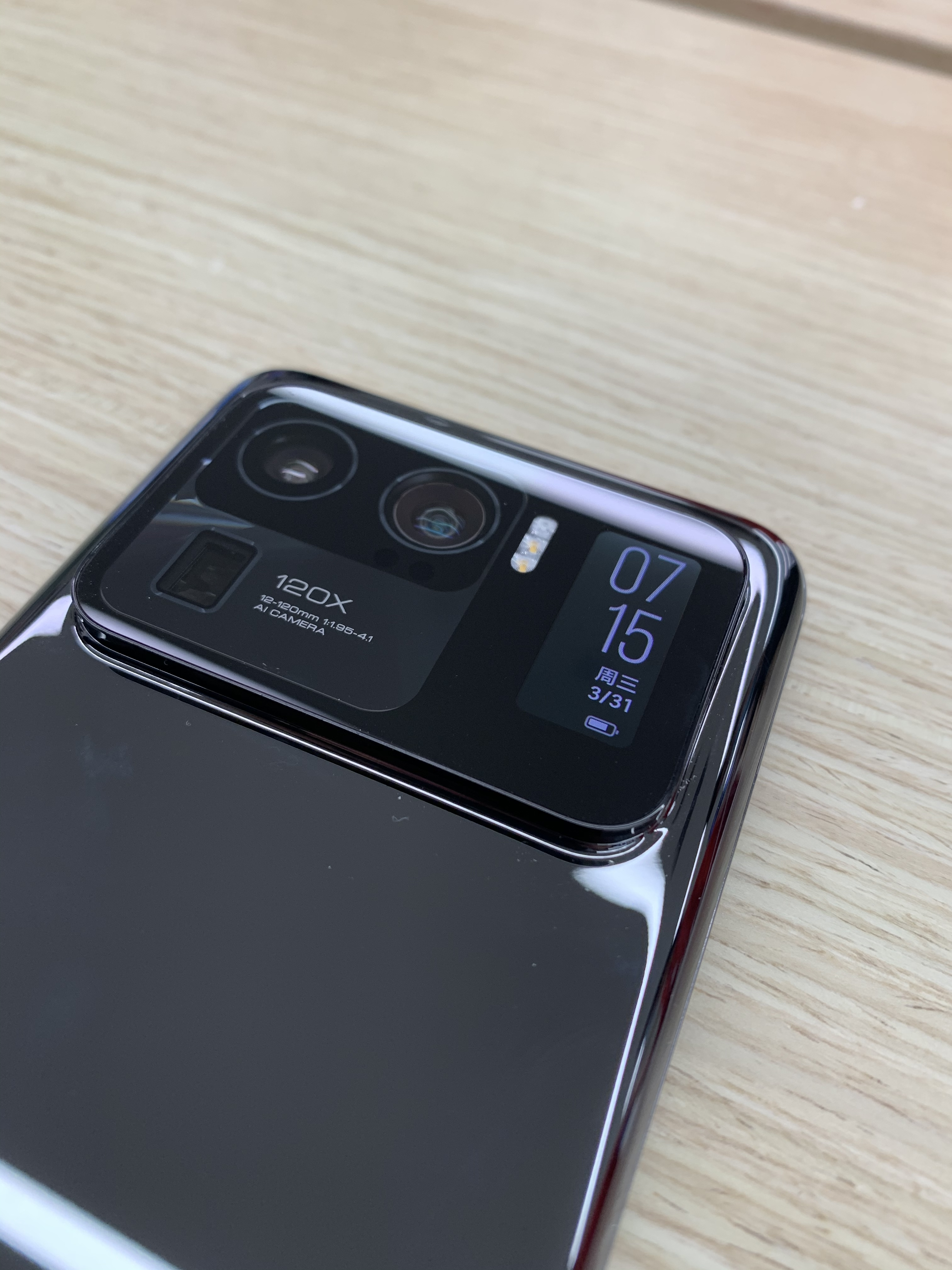
Xiaomi Mi 11 Ultra secondary display

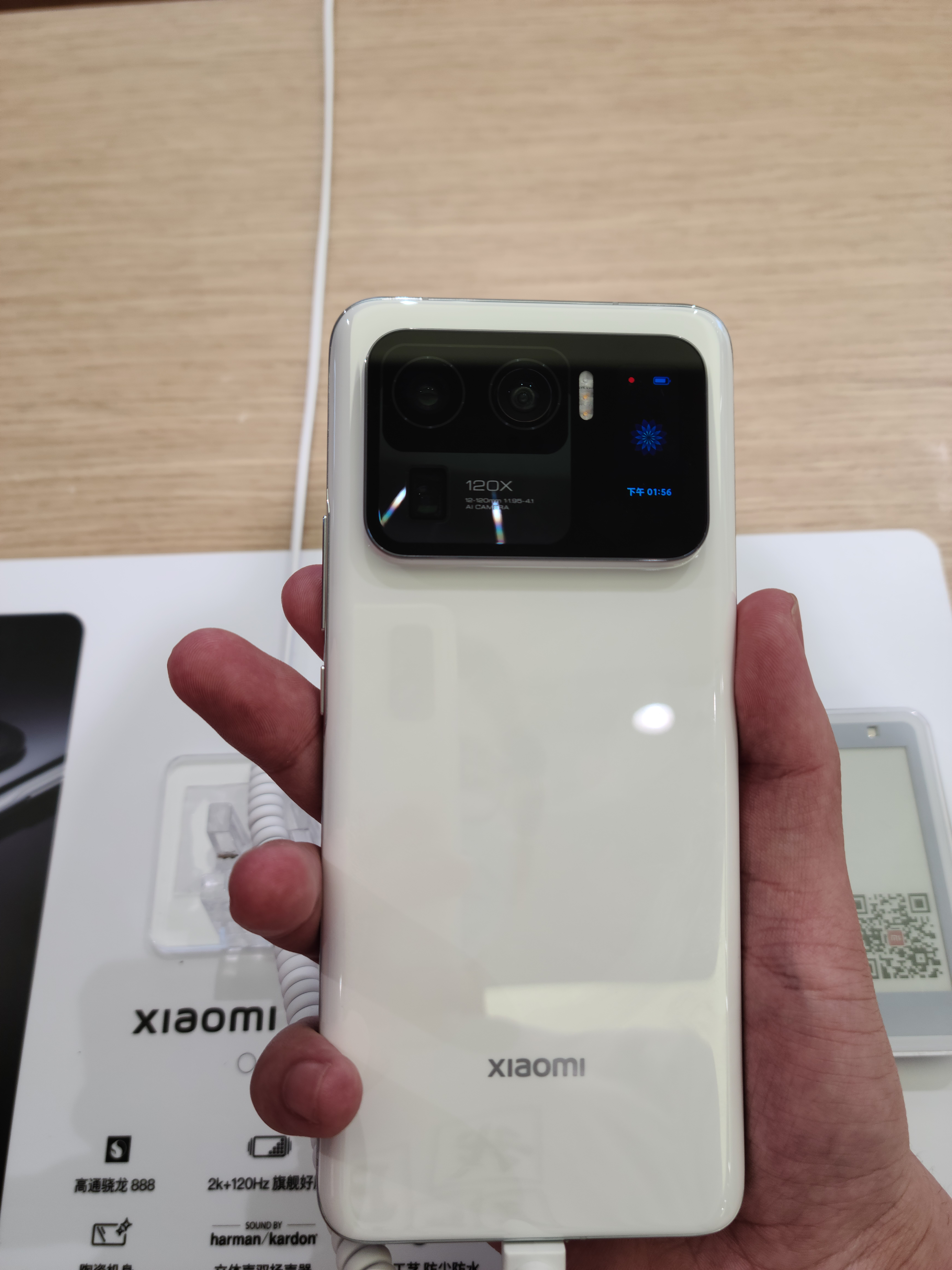
Mi 11 Ultra Ceramic White

The Mi 11 Ultra and Mi 11 Pro are the higher flagship variants, which use Qualcomm Snapdragon 888 chipset and are the first devices to come with silicon-oxygen anode battery. The Mi 11 Lite uses Snapdragon 732G, Mi 11 Lite 5G has Snapdragon 780G, and the Xiaomi 11 Lite 5G NE has Snapdragon 778G. All of these Lite phones are the thinnest smartphones of that year. Mi 11 Ultra also comes with a secondary display at the back.
