= Xiaomi Mi 11 Lite =

2021 mobile phone

Xiaomi Mi 11 Lite Xiaomi Mi 11 Lite 5G Xiaomi 11 Lite 5G NE
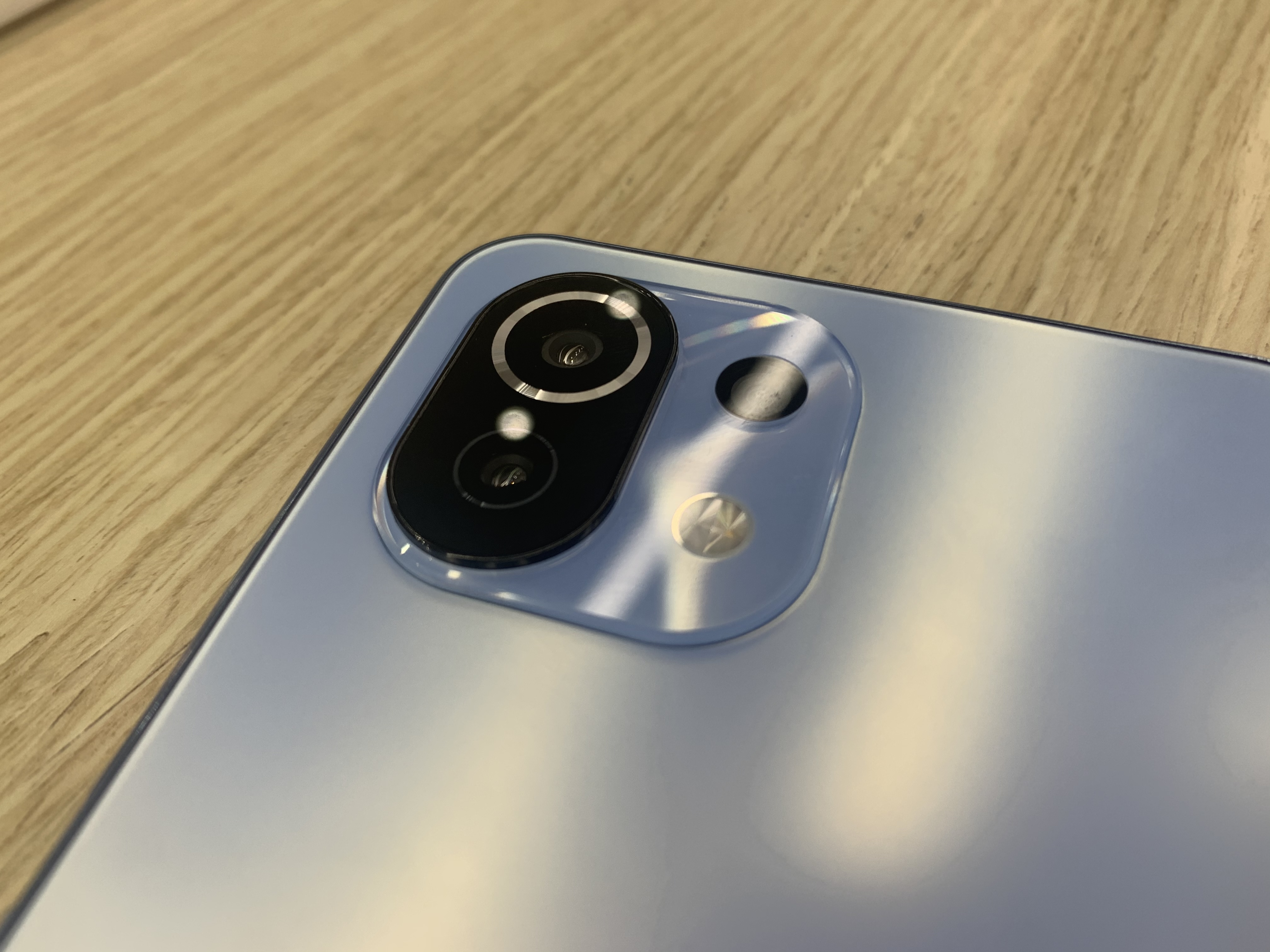
- Mi 11 Lite main camera module
- Also sold as: 5G: Mi 11 Youth Edition (in China); 5G NE: Mi 11 LE (in China), Xiaomi 11 Lite NE (in India)
- Manufacturer: Xiaomi
- Type: Phablet
- Series: Mi/Xiaomi
- First released: 4G/5G: March 29, 2021; 5 years ago 5G NE: September 15, 2021; 5 years ago
- Predecessor: Xiaomi Mi 10 Lite
- Successor: Xiaomi 12 Lite
- Related: Xiaomi Mi 11; Xiaomi Mi 11i Xiaomi 11i
- Compatible networks: 4G: GSM, 3G, 4G (LTE); 5G/5G NE: GSM, 3G, 4G (LTE), 5G
- Form factor: Slate
- Dimensions: 160.53×75.73×6.81 mm (6.320×2.981×0.268 in)
- Weight: 4G: 157 g 5G: 159 g 5G NE: 158 g
- Operating system: 4G/5G: Initial: Android 11 + MIUI 12; Current: Android 13 + MIUI 14; 5G NE: Initial: Android 11 + MIUI 12.5; Current: Android 14 + Xiaomi HyperOS 2
- System-on-chip: 4G: Qualcomm SM7150 Snapdragon 732G (8 nm); 5G: Qualcomm SM7350-AB Snapdragon 780G (5 nm); 5G NE: Qualcomm SM7325 Snapdragon 778G (6 nm)
- CPU: 4G: 8 cores (2×2.3 GHz Kryo 470 Gold & 6×1.8 GHz Kryo 470 Silver); 5G: 8 cores (1×2.4 GHz Kryo 670 & 3×2.2 GHz Kryo 670 & 4×1.9 GHz Kryo 670); 5G NE: 8 cores (4×2.4 GHz Kryo 670 & 4×1.8 GHz Kryo 670)
- GPU: 4G: Adreno 618; 5G: Adreno 642; 5G NE: Adreno 642L
- Memory: 6/8 GB, LPDDR4X
- Storage: 4G: 64/128 GB; 5G/5G NE: 128/256 GB; UFS 2.2
- Removable storage: MicroSD up to 1 TB
- SIM: Dual SIM (Nano-SIM)
- Battery: Non-removable, Li-Po 4250 mAh
- Charging: 33 W fast charging
- Rear camera: 64 MP, f/1.79, 26mm (wide), 1/1.97", 0.7µm, PDAF + 8 MP, f/2.2, 119˚ (ultrawide), 1/4", 1.12µm + 5 MP, f/2.4, (macro), 1.12µm, AF; LED flash, HDR, panorama Video: 4K@30fps, 1080p@30/60/120fps; gyro-EIS
- Front camera: 4G: 16 MP, f/2.45, 25mm (wide), 1/3.06", 1µm 5G/5G NE: 20 MP, f/2.2, 27mm (wide), 1/3.4", 0.8µm HDR, panorama Video: 1080p@30fps, 720p@120fps
- Display: All models: AMOLED, 6.55", 2400 × 1080 (FullHD+), 20:9, 402 ppi, 90 Hz refresh rate 4G: HDR10; 5G/5G NE: HDR10+
- Sound: Stereo speakers
- Connectivity: USB-C 2.0, Bluetooth 5.1 (4G and Indian 5G NE)/5.2 (A2DP, LE), NFC, IR blaster, Wi-Fi 802.11 a/b/g/n/ac/6 (except for 4G and Indian 5G NE) (dual-band, Wi-Fi Direct), GPS, A-GPS, GLONASS, BeiDou, Galileo, QZSS (5G), NavIC (5G)
- Data inputs: Fingerprint scanner (side-mounted), virtual proximity sensor, ambient light sensor, accelerometer, gyroscope, compass
- Water resistance: IP53
- Model: 4G: M2101K9AG, M2101K9AI; 5G: M2101K9G, M2101K9C, M2101K9R; 5G NE: 2109119DG, 2107119DC, 2109119DI
- Codename: 4G: courbet 4G (India): courbetin 5G: renoir 5G NE: lisa
- Made in: 4G/5G NE: China, India; 5G: China
- Website: https://www.mi.com/ua/product/mi-11-lite/

The Xiaomi Mi 11 Lite is a line of Android smartphones developed, designed, manufactured by Xiaomi, serving as part of the Mi series.

The lineup consists of the Mi 11 Lite, Mi 11 Lite 5G, and Xiaomi 11 Lite 5G NE. The Mi 11 Lite and Mi 11 Lite 5G are positioned as mid-range versions of the flagship Mi 11, while the Xiaomi 11 Lite 5G NE (New Edition) serves as a refreshed version of the Mi 11 Lite 5G. The Mi 11 Lite and Mi 11 Lite 5G were officially announced on March 29, 2021, while the Xiaomi 11 Lite 5G NE was introduced on September 15, 2021, alongside the Xiaomi 11T series. The primary differences between the models lie in 5G cellular connectivity support and different systems on a chip (SoC).

== Model variations ==
In Chinese markets, the Mi 11 Lite 5G was sold under the name Xiaomi Mi 11 Youth Edition (Chinese: 小米11青春版).

In India, the Xiaomi 11 Lite 5G NE was released under the slightly modified name Xiaomi 11 Lite NE. It was marketed as an upgrade to the standard Mi 11 Lite (as the original Mi 11 Lite 5G was not officially released in India) and carries minor connectivity configuration differences. In the Chinese domestic market, this hardware configuration was made available as the Xiaomi Mi 11 LE (Lite Edition) (Chinese: Xiaomi 11 青春活力版; literally Xiaomi 11 Youth Vitality Edition).

== Design & build ==
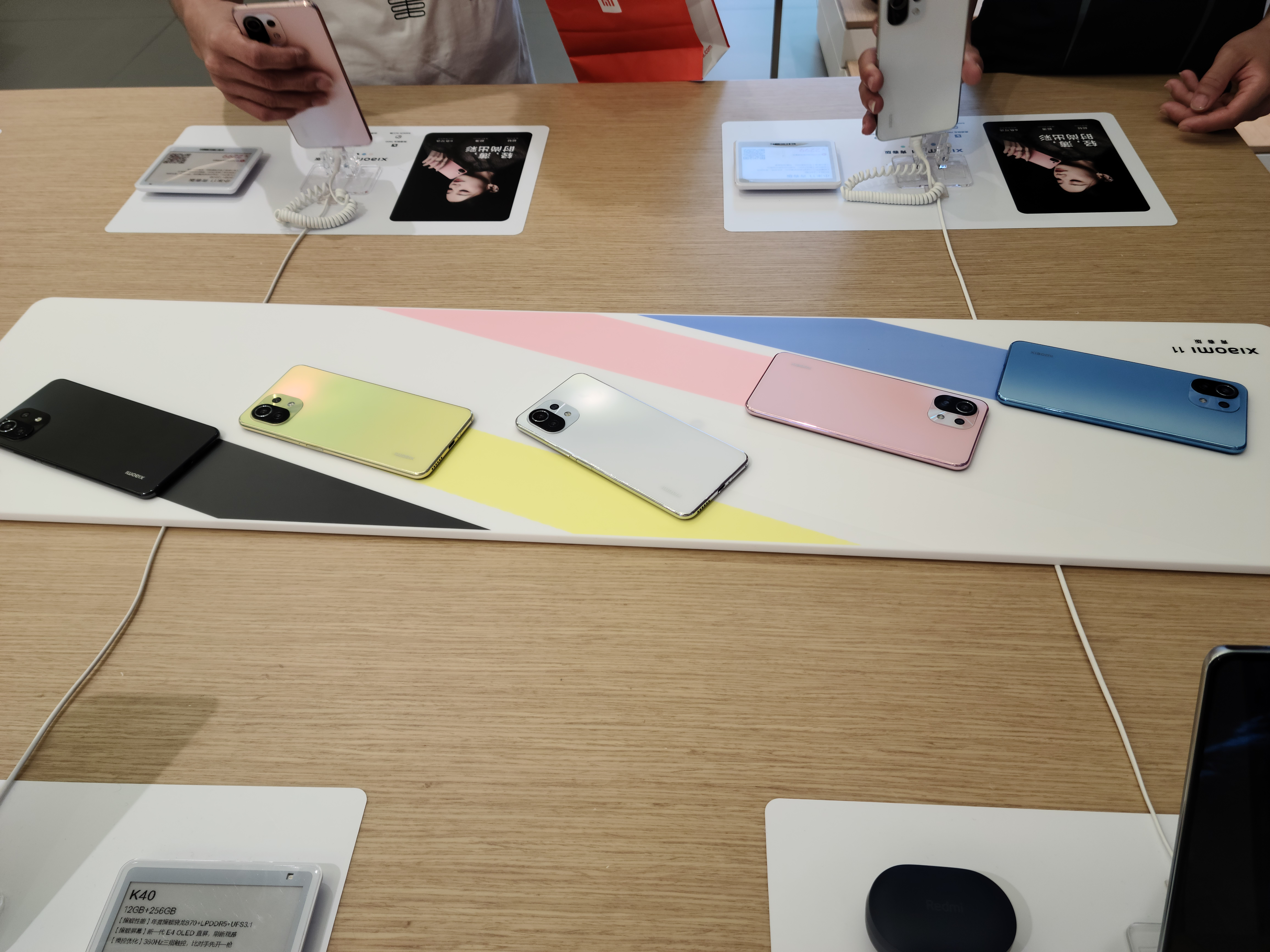
Color options of the Mi 11 Lite 5G in China

The front panel of the Mi 11 Lite and Xiaomi 11 Lite 5G NE is constructed using Corning Gorilla Glass 5, whereas the Mi 11 Lite 5G uses Gorilla Glass 6. The rear panels across all variants are made of glass, combined with a plastic chassis frame. Visually, the smartphones retain a design language similar to the flagship Mi 11, though they feature flat displays and rear panels instead of curved glass. The bottom edge houses the USB-C port, primary loudspeaker, microphone, and a hybrid card tray. This tray can support either two SIM cards or one SIM card alongside a MicroSD storage expansion card up to 1 TB. The top edge includes a secondary noise-canceling microphone and an IR blaster. The right side features the volume rocker adjustments and a physical power button that integrates a capacitive fingerprint scanner.

The color options differ from the following models:

- Mi 11 Lite was sold in three color profiles: Boba Black (glossy black), Bubblegum Blue, and Peach Pink.
- Mi 11 Lite 5G arrived in three matte configurations: Truffle Black, Mint Green, and Citrus Yellow. In China, it was available in five colors: matte black, yellow, pink, blue, and white.
- Xiaomi 11 Lite 5G NE was distributed in four colors: Truffle Black, Bubblegum Blue, Peach Pink, and Snowflake White (featuring a distinct frosted sparkle pattern).

== Specifications ==
=== Platform ===
The Mi 11 Lite is powered by the Qualcomm Snapdragon 732G SoC, while the Mi 11 Lite 5G features the Snapdragon 780G, and the Xiaomi 11 Lite 5G NE runs on the Snapdragon 778G. The Mi 11 Lite 5G is notable for being one of the only mass-production smartphones to utilize the Snapdragon 780G platform.

=== Battery ===
All models are equipped with a non-removable 4250 mAh battery capable of 33 W fast charging.

=== Camera ===
The devices share a triple-lens rear camera system. This comprises a 64 MP main wide-angle camera with a f/1.79 aperture and phase-detection autofocus (PDAF), an 8 MP ultra-wide-angle lens with a f/2.2 aperture, and a 5 MP macro sensor with a f/2.4 aperture. The primary sensor arrangement supports video recording up to 4K resolution at 30fps. For front-facing cameras, the 4G model uses a 16 MP sensor with a f/2.45 aperture, while the 5G and 5G NE variants use a higher-resolution 20 MP sensor with a f/2.2 aperture. Self-facing video capture across all variants maxes out at 1080p at 30fps.

=== Display ===
The display features a 6.55-inch AMOLED screen running at a FullHD+ resolution (2400 × 1080) with a pixel density of 402 ppi. It operates at an aspect ratio of 20:9, supports a 90 Hz refresh rate, and uses a circular punch-hole cutout in the upper left corner for the front-facing camera. The baseline Mi 11 Lite handles high-dynamic range content up to HDR10, while the Mi 11 Lite 5G and 11 Lite 5G NE models support the advanced HDR10+ standard.

=== Audio ===
Stereo sound rendering is handled via dedicated dual speakers, where the ear receiver earpiece doubles as a secondary channel.

=== Memory and Storage ===
- Mi 11 Lite configurations included 6/64 GB, 6/128 GB, and 8/128 GB memory alternatives.
- Mi 11 Lite 5G and Xiaomi 11 Lite 5G NE models were sold in 6/128 GB, 8/128 GB, and 8/256 GB variations utilizing UFS 2.2 flash storage storage modules.

=== Software ===
The Mi 11 Lite and Mi 11 Lite 5G launched with MIUI 12 based on Android 11, receiving subsequent platform upgrades up to MIUI 14 on top of Android 13. The Xiaomi 11 Lite 5G NE launched running MIUI 12.5 based on Android 11 and has been updated to Xiaomi HyperOS 2 running on top of Android 14.

OS Update History for Mi 11 Lite & Lite 5G
Date	OS	UI	References
March 2021	Andorid 11	MIUI 12	
February 2022	Android 12	MIUI 13	
February 2023	Android 13	MIUI 14	

OS Update History for Mi 11 Lite 5G NE
October 2024	Android 14	HyperOS 2.0

It has a built-in Game Turbo for gaming experience, Second Space for hiding apps and data, and Quick Ball for shortcut functions.

== Release ==
=== 11 Lite ===
==== March 29, 2021 ====
International release

==== April 22, 2021 ====
Philippines

=== 11 Lite 5G ===
==== March 29, 2021 ====
International release

==== April 16, 2021 ====
United Kingdom

=== 11 Lite 5G NE ===
==== September 15, 2021 ====
International release

==== September 29, 2021 ====
India

== Reception ==
TechRadar reviewer Jon Mundy marked positive for the design, performance, and the main camera, but it was criticized for its UI, mediocre ultra-wide camera, and its battery capacity and life. The camera of the smartphone was capabale for its adequate image processing, decent lighting and night shots.
