= Xiaomi Mi 10 Ultra =

Smartphones manufactured by Xiaomi

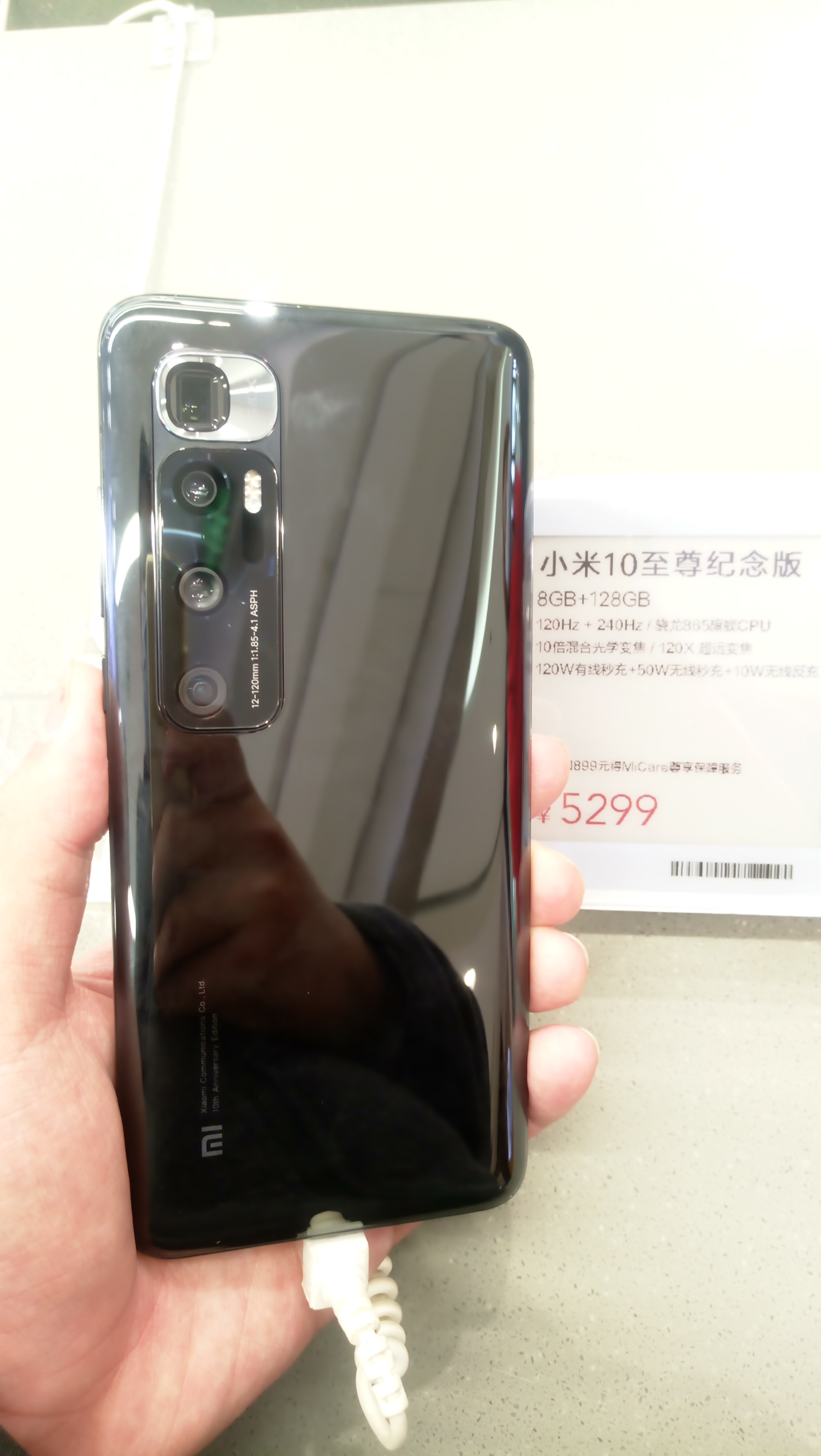
- Manufacturer: Xiaomi
- Type: Touchscreen smartphone
- Series: Mi
- First released: 16 August 2020; 5 years ago
- Predecessor: Xiaomi Mi 9 Pro
- Successor: Xiaomi Mi 11 Ultra
- Related: Xiaomi Mi 10; Xiaomi Mi 10T
- Compatible networks: 2G, 3G, 4G, 4G LTE, 5G
- Form factor: Slate
- Dimensions: 162.4 mm (6.39 in) H; 75.1 mm (2.96 in) W; 9.5 mm (0.37 in) D
- Weight: 221.8 g (7.82 oz)
- Operating system: Original: MIUI 12 based on Android 10; Current: Xiaomi HyperOS based on Android 13
- System-on-chip: Qualcomm Snapdragon 865
- CPU: Octa-core Kryo 585 (1x 2.84 GHz + 3x 2.42 GHz + 4x 1.8 GHz)
- GPU: Adreno 650
- Memory: 8 GB, 12 GB or 16 GB LPDDR5 RAM
- Storage: 128 GB, 256 GB or 512 GB UFS 3.1
- Removable storage: None
- Battery: 4500 mAh; 120W wired fast charging, 50W wireless fast charging
- Rear camera: Quad-Camera Setup; Primary: OmniVision OV48C; 48 MP, f/1.85, 25mm, FoV 82°, 1/1.32", 1.2 μm, PDAF, OIS; Periscope Telephoto: Sony IMX 586; 48 MP, f/4.1, 120mm, 1/2.32", 0.8 μm, PDAF, OIS, 5x optical zoom; Telephoto: Samsung ISOCELL Fast S5K2L7; 12 MP, f/2.0, 50mm, 1/2.55", 1.4 μm, dual pixel PDAF, 2x optical zoom; Ultrawide: Sony IMX 350; 20 MP, f/2.2, 12mm, FoV 128°, 1/2.78", 1.0 μm, PDAF; Features: Laser AF, color spectrum sensor, Dual-LED flash, HDR, panorama; Video: 8K@24fps, 4K@30/60fps, 1080p@30/60/120/240/960fps, gyro-EIS, HDR10 rec.
- Front camera: Samsung ISOCELL Slim S5K3T2; 20 MP, f/2.3, (wide), 1/3.4", 0.8μm; Features: HDR; Video: 1080p@30fps, 720p@120fps, gyro-EIS
- Display: 6.67 inches, 1080 x 2340 pixels (2.5 MP), (386 ppi), OLED touchscreen, 1B colors HDR10+ DCI-P3; 120 Hz refresh rate
- Connectivity: Wi-Fi 802.11a/b/g/n/ac/6 (2.4 & 5GHz), dual-band, WiFi Direct, DLNA, hotspot Bluetooth V5.1, A2DP, Low-energy, aptX HD, aptX Adaptive

The Xiaomi Mi 10 Ultra is an Android-based high-end smartphone developed by Xiaomi Inc. announced on 11 August 2020 as a celebration of Xiaomi's 10th anniversary. Unlike the Mi 10 and Mi 10 Pro, Mi 10 Ultra is only available on the Chinese market.

== Specifications ==
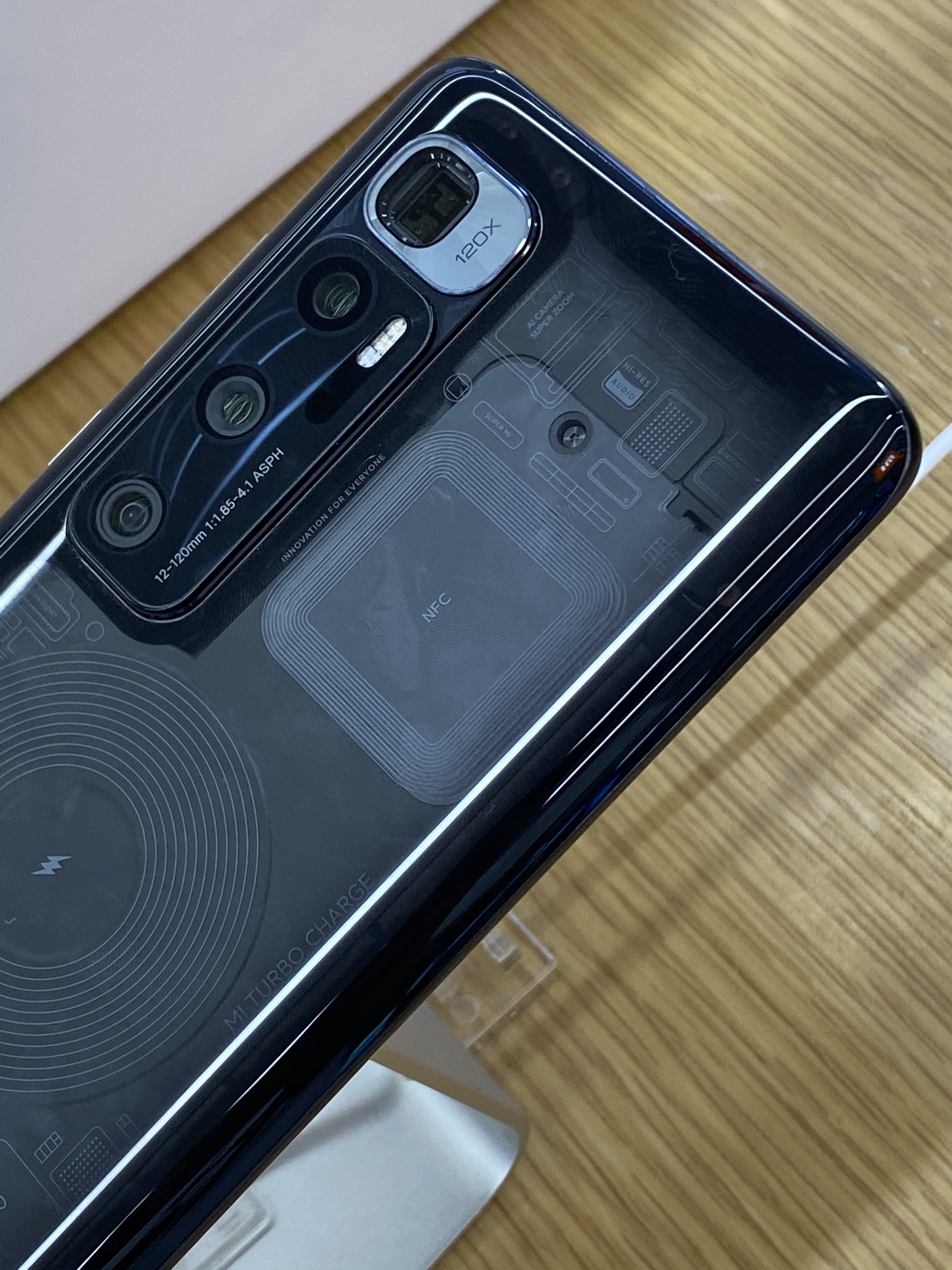
The camera island of the Mi 10 Ultra

=== Design ===
The Mi 10 Ultra uses an aluminum frame, Gorilla Glass 5 on the front and Gorilla Glass 6 on the back. The display is curved and larger than the Mi 9 Pro; a circular cutout in the upper left hand corner for the front-facing camera replaces the Mi 9 Pro's notch. The camera module is rectangular and protrudes slightly, with a lower module housing three sensors and the flash, and an upper module for the periscope telephoto sensor with a silver accent. It is available in Obsidian Black, Mercury Silver, and a special Transparent Edition.

=== Hardware ===
The Mi 10 Ultra is powered by the Qualcomm Snapdragon 865 processor, with the Adreno 650 GPU. Storage is non-expandable with 128, 256 or 512 GB of UFS 3.1 paired with 8, 12 or 16 GB of LPDDR5 RAM.

It has an 6.67-inch (169 mm) FHD+ OLED display manufactured by TCL with HDR10+ support, and an optical (in-screen) fingerprint scanner. However, the panel has a higher 120 Hz refresh rate compared to 90 Hz on the Mi 10 and Mi 10 Pro, and can display one billion colors. The battery is graphene-based lithium-ion with a 4500mAh capacity; charging is supported wired over USB-C at up to 120 W or wirelessly at up to 50 W (Qi), with 10 W reverse charging.

The rear features a quad camera setup, with a 48 MP wide sensor, a 48 MP 5x zoom "periscope" telephoto sensor, a 12 MP 2x zoom telephoto sensor, and a 20 MP ultrawide sensor. The front-facing camera uses a 20 MP sensor. The camera system, including processing, scored the highest results in the history of DxOMark testing and review, for both still photography and videography.

=== Software ===
The Mi 10 Ultra runs on Android 10, with Xiaomi's custom MIUI 12 skin.

In 2024, the device was upgraded to Xiaomi HyperOS based on Android 14.

== See also ==
- List of longest smartphone telephoto lenses
