= Xiaomi Civi =

Android-based smartphone manufactured by Xiaomi Inc

Xiaomi Civi Xiaomi Civi 1S
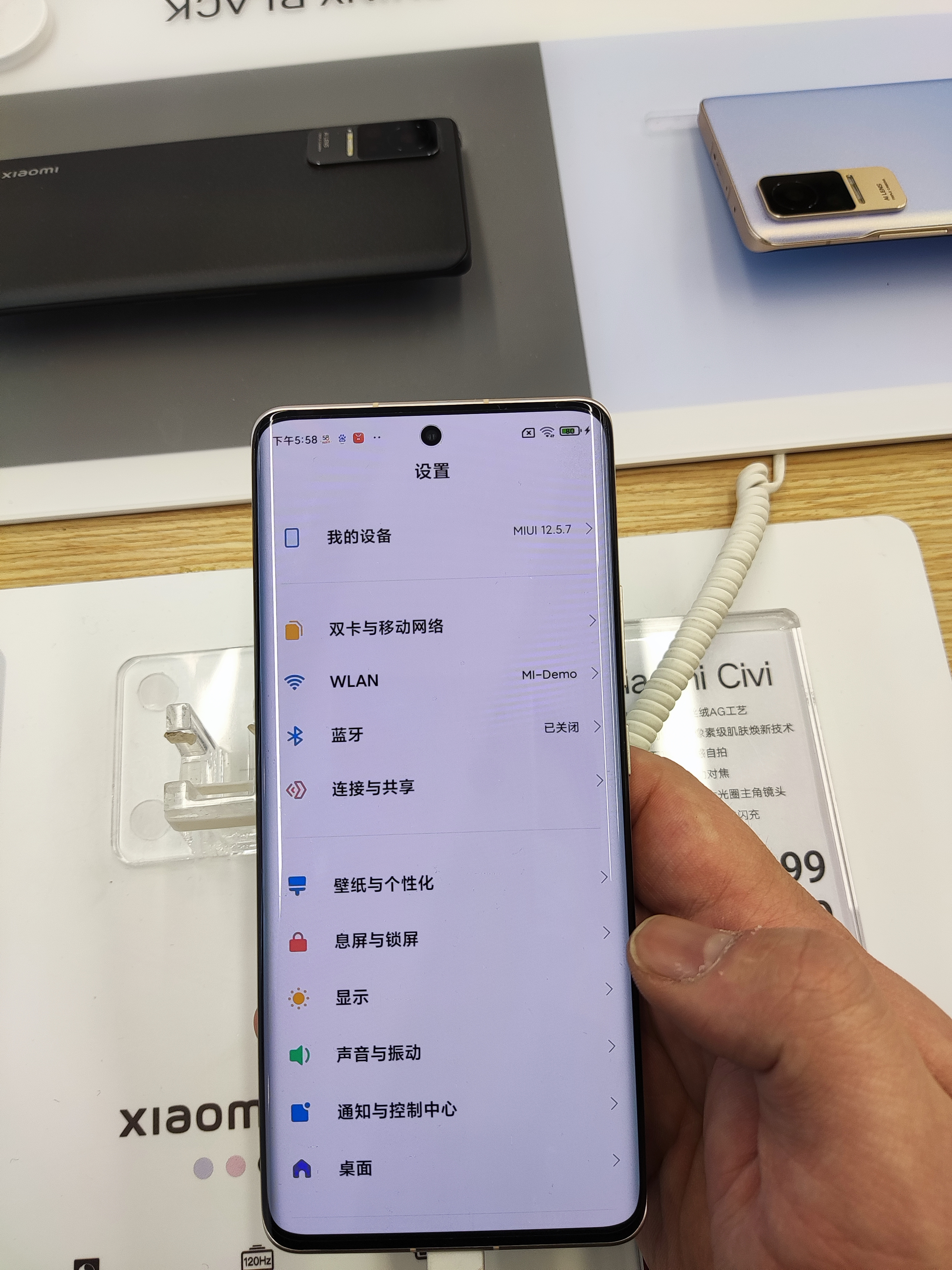
- The front of Xiaomi Civi
- Manufacturer: Xiaomi
- Type: Phablet
- Series: Civi
- First released: Civi: 27 September 2021; 4 years ago Civi 1S: 21 April 2022; 4 years ago
- Predecessor: Xiaomi Mi CC9
- Successor: Xiaomi Civi 2
- Related: Xiaomi 11 Lite 5G NE
- Compatible networks: GSM, 3G, 4G (LTE), 5G
- Form factor: Monoblock
- Colors: Civi: Black, Blue, Pink; Civi 1S: Black, Blue, Pink, Silver
- Dimensions: 158.3×71.5×7 mm (6.23×2.81×0.28 in)
- Weight: 166 g (5.9 oz)
- Operating system: Civi: Initial: Android 11 + MIUI 12.5; Current: Android 13 + Xiaomi HyperOS; Civi 1S: Initial: Android 12 + MIUI 13; Current: Android 14 + Xiaomi HyperOS
- System-on-chip: Civi: Qualcomm SM7325 Snapdragon 778G 5G (6 nm); Civi 1S: Qualcomm SM7325 Snapdragon 778G+ 5G
- CPU: Civi: 8 cores (4x2.4 GHz Kryo 670 & 4x1.8 GHz Kryo 670 ) Civi 1S: 8 cores (1x2.5 GHz Kryo 670 & 3x2.4 GHz Kryo 670 & 4x1.8 GHz Kryo 670)
- GPU: Adreno 642L
- Memory: 8/12 GB, LPDDR4X
- Storage: 128/256 GB, UFS 2.2
- SIM: Dual SIM (Nano-SIM)
- Battery: Non-removable, Li-Po 4550 mAh
- Charging: Fast charging at 55W, 100% in 45 min
- Rear camera: 64MP, f/1.79, 26mm (wide), 1/1.97", 0.7 μm, PDAF + 8MP, f/2.2, 120˚ (ultra-wide), 1/4.0", 1.12 μm + 2 Mp, f/2.4, (macro); 2-LED dual-tone flash, HDR, panorama Video: 4K@30fps, 1080p@30/60/120fps; gyro-EIS
- Front camera: 32 Mp (wide-angle), AF; HDR, panorama Video: 1080p@30fps
- Display: AMOLED, 6.55", 2400 × 1080 (FullHD+), 20:9, 402 ppi, 120 Hz, HDR10+
- Connectivity: USB-C 2.0, Bluetooth 5.2 (A2DP, LE), NFC, IR port, Wi-Fi 802.11 a/b/g/n/ac/6e (dual-band, Wi-Fi Direct, hotspot), GPS, tri-band A-GPS, GLONASS (1), Beidou (3), Galileo (2), QZSS (2), NavIC
- Model: Civi: 2109119BC "'Xiaomi 11 Lite 5G NE"' 2109119DG, 2107119DC, 2109119DI; Civi 1S: 2204119EC "'Xiaomi 12 Lite"' 2203129G
- Codename: Civi: mona "Xiaomi 11 Lite 5G NE:" lisa/ Civi 1S: zijin "Xiaomi 12 Lite:" taoyao
- Other: Fingerprint scanner (under display, optical), virtual proximity sensor, light sensor, accelerometer, gyroscope, compass

Xiaomi Civi and Xiaomi Civi 1S are mid-level youth smartphones of Xiaomi. Xiaomi Civi was presented on September 27, 2021, and Civi 1S on April 21, 2022. Xiaomi Civi is the successor of Xiaomi Mi CC9. The main differences between the models are the processor and the silver colour in the 1S.

== Design ==
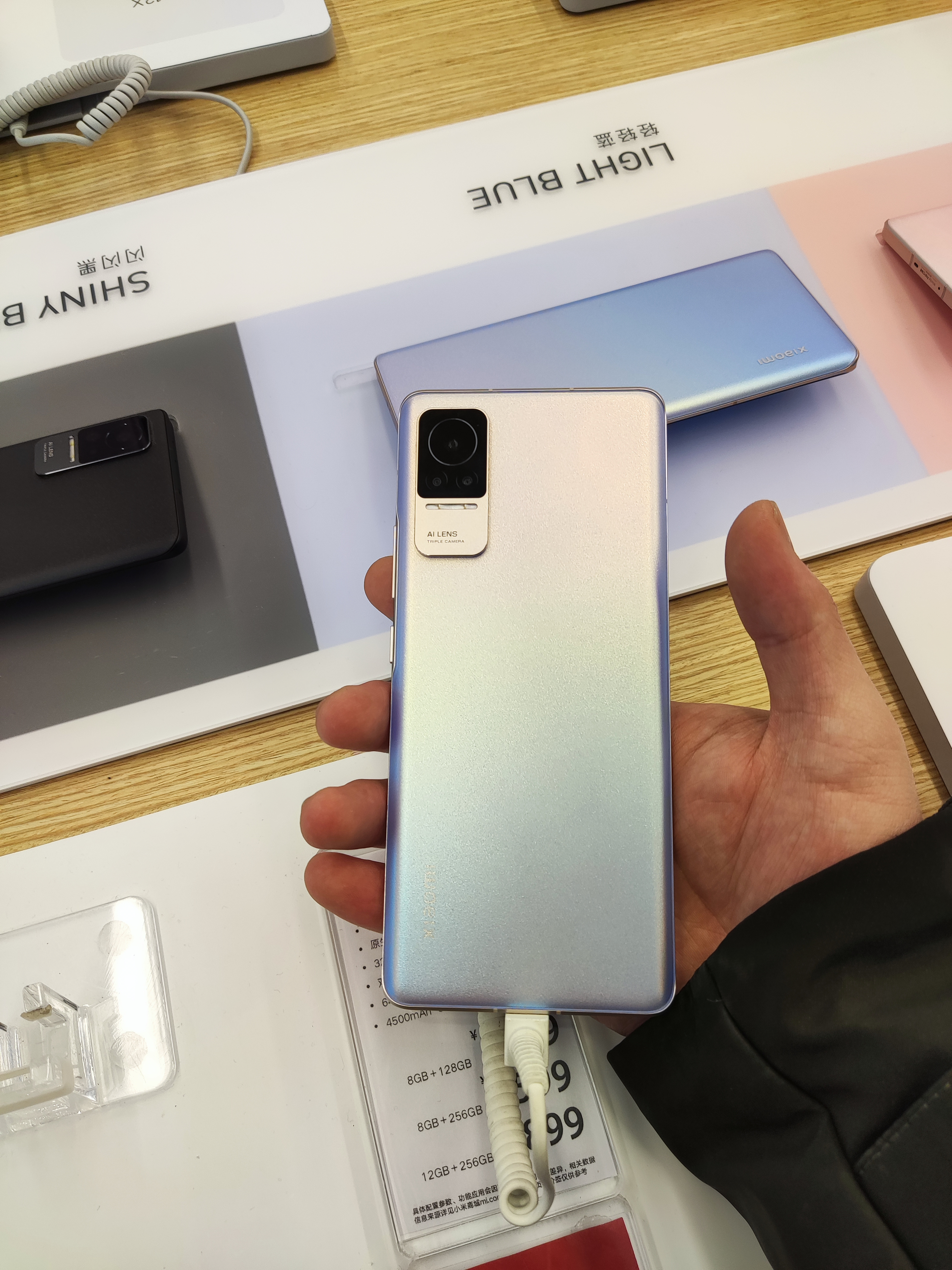
Xiaomi Civi Back

The screen is made of Corning Gorilla Glass 5. The back panel is made of glass. The side part is made of aluminium.

By design, the models are similar to Vivo smartphones.

The USB-C connector, speaker, microphone and slot for 2 SIM-cards are located below. On top are the second microphone and IR port. On the right side are the volume buttons and the smartphone lock button.

Xiaomi Civi was sold in 3 colors: Black, Blue and Pink.

Xiaomi Civi 1S was sold in 4 colors: Black, Blue, Pink and Silver.

== Specifications ==
=== Platform ===
Xiaomi Civi received a Qualcomm Snapdragon 778G processor, and Civi 1S —Snapdragon 778G+. Both are paired with an Adreno 642L GPU.

=== Battery ===
The battery received a volume of 4500 mAh and support for fast charging at 55 W.

=== Camera ===
Smartphones received a main triple camera 64 MP, f/1.79 (wide-angle) + 8 MP, f/2.2 with a viewing angle of 120° (ultra-wide) + 2 MP, f/2.4 (macro) with phase detection autofocus and the ability to record video in 4K@30fps resolution. The front camera received a resolution of 32 MP (wide-angle), autofocus and the ability to record video in 1080p@30fps resolution.

=== Screen ===
Screen AMOLED, 6.55", FullHD+ (2400 × 1080) with pixel density 402 ppi, aspect ratio 20:9, display refresh rate 120 Hz, support.
