= MIUI =

Android-based mobile OS developed by Xiaomi

- Screenshot Screenshot of MIUI 14
- Developer: Xiaomi
- OS family: Android (Linux)
- Source model: Open source (Modified Android Base and Main Framework) with Proprietary components (MIUI Apps and Kits)
- Initial release: 0.8.16 / 16 August 2010; 16 years ago
- Latest release: Varies by mobile phone and region.
- Latest preview: V14.0.23.10.15.DEV (Mainland China) / 20 October 2023; 3 years ago
- Marketing target: Alternative OS replacement for Android devices; Stock firmware for Xiaomi smartphone and tablet
- Available in: 77 languages (varies by country)
- Package manager: APK-based
- Supported platforms: ARMv7, ARM64, MIPS, x86, x64
- Kernel type: Monolithic (modified Linux kernel)
- License: Proprietary
- Succeeded by: Xiaomi HyperOS
- Official website: www.mi.com/global/miui (Global) home.miui.com (Mainland China)

MIUI (Note: /ˌmiː.juː.ˈaɪ/ MEE-yoo-EYE) is a deprecated mobile operating system developed and used by Xiaomi for its smartphones and mobile devices from 2010 to early 2024, prior to the launch of its successor Xiaomi HyperOS. MIUI was based on the Android Open Source Project. Xiaomi produced versions for Xiaomi-branded smartphones and its own Poco, MIUI Pad, MIUI Watch, and MIUI TV (PatchWall).

There are different versions for each Xiaomi phone model, and each version has regional variants dependent on where the phone is sold, including China, Europe, Indonesia, India, Japan, Pakistan, Russia, Taiwan and Turkey. Xiaomi also released a few devices running Google's Android One instead of MIUI. Xiaomi devices usually receive three Android version updates, and MIUI updates for four years (less for budget models).

The first MIUI ROM, released in 2010, was based on Android 2.2.x Froyo and was initially developed in China by Xiaomi in its first year of operation. Xiaomi added a number of apps to the basic framework, including Notes, Backup, Music, and Gallery apps.

An organisation named Xiaomi Europe, using the domain xiaomi.eu and working officially with Xiaomi despite not being affiliated with the Chinese company, was set up in 2010 as a community for English-language Xiaomi users with phones running MIUI, and later HyperOS, associated with an Android version. xiaomi.eu makes available for free download debloated and improved ROM images based on China MIUI and HyperOS ROMs. Installing these images is technically challenging.

== Google Play services ==
Google had disagreements with the Chinese government, and the Great Firewall currently blocks access to all Google services. Since Xiaomi has expanded its operations outside China, MIUI releases for Android devices outside mainland China have Google Play Services and Google apps such as Gmail, GMaps, YouTube and Google Play pre-installed and functioning as on any other Android device. MIUI global versions are certified by Google, as are all MIUI devices, which ship with Google Play Services since MIUI 12.5.

== Comparison of all MIUI variants ==
There are different versions of MIUI, and its successor HyperOS, for different regions: China, EEA (Europe), India, etc., and a global version. For each region different Xiaomi devices have different implementations. The EEA version differs from the global version in meeting specific EEA regulations for mobile phones regarding advertising and other issues. Each version has successive, numbered, releases.

The version code consists of the release number followed by seven letters. The first letter identifies the Android version it is based on, the second and third letters specify the device model, the fourth and fifth letters the region, and the last two letters the mobile operator, or "XM" if not locked to any operator. For example, MIUI V12.0.5.0.QFAEUXM is release 12.0.5 of MIUI, based on Android 10, for Mi 9, EEA version, not locked to an operator.

	China		Global		Xiaomi.eu	
Languages available	Few, including Chinese and English		Wide selection			
Selection of downloadable themes	All		Some			
Drag up search	Yes with international Bing and selection of Chinese search engines		Google App or Mi Browser		Yes	
Smart Assistant	App vault		Google Discover and App Vault			
Default source of apps	GetApps		Google Play, Mi Picks/GetApps		Google Play	
Xiaomi Cloud services	All		Some		All	
Updates	Developer	Stable	Beta	Stable	Dev/Beta	Stable
Updates	No longer available	Usually updated every two months	No longer available	Usually updated every three months	Updated every Friday	Usually updated every two months
OTA	Yes				Yes; patches are not supported, so a complete new ROM is downloaded each time	
Official	Yes (made by Xiaomi)				Approved by the official distribution in the European Union.	
Custom recovery requirement	No				Some (recovery ROMs only)	
Additional features	Optional access to various Chinese online services; built-in root support (unlocked bootloader is required)	Optional access to various Chinese online services	Google apps on some ROMs instead of MIUI apps (Dialer, Messages, Contacts, Calendar)		Additional icons for some third-party apps; Unlocked some hardware features on selected devices	
Supported Xiaomi devices	Majority excluding devices never released in PRC Older devices may not be updated		Majority excluding devices never released outside PRC Older devices may not be updated			

== Android ==
Although MIUI is built on the Android platform, the default user interface of its earlier iterations resembled iOS due to the absence of the application tray, with a grid of icons arrayed in the home panels. Other iOS similarities include the app icons being in a uniform shape, the dialer and in-call interface, the organization of the Settings app, and the visual appearance of toggles in the UI. This prompted some observers to cite how the devices running on MIUI could appeal to iOS users wanting to switch to the Android platform. By 2018, MIUI was increasingly shifting towards a design aesthetic more similar to stock Android. For instance, several elements in builds of MIUI 10 resemble Android Pie features, such as the multitasking menu and gesture controls. This change was first seen in MIUI 9 (ver. 8.5.11) that shipped with Xiaomi Mi MIX 2S.

Another difference from Android is MIUI's support for themes and custom fonts. Users can download theme packs and fonts, which can change the user interface of the device when installed from the Mi Themes Store. It also allows more advanced users to tweak the hard-coded firmware of the handsets.

== Issues ==
As MIUI's kernel was proprietary, it was in breach of Linux kernel's GPL. The source code of certain components was released to GitHub on 25 October 2013. Kernel sources for a few devices, including the Mi3, Mi4, MiNote, and Redmi 1S, were released in March 2015.

In order to raise funds for the company, MIUI has its own online services from Xiaomi, including cloud services, paid themes and games. Payments are transacted using the Mi Credit digital currency.

After the government of India banned over 100 Chinese apps and services in 2020 due to national security and privacy concerns, including some made by Xiaomi, the company produced separate MIUI versions without them for India.

=== Vulnerabilities ===
In April 2019, Indian security researcher Md. Arif Khan reported that Xiaomi's apps Mi Browser and Mint Browser, for Indian and some global versions of MIUI, suffered from a vulnerability that allowed the URL address bar to be spoofed. Xiaomi gave Khan a bug bounty but opted not to fix this issue. In addition, a vulnerability in a wallpaper carousel app Glance on Indian versions of MIUI allowed a user to bypass the lock screen and access clipboard data; it was eventually fixed by Xiaomi.

=== Performance issues ===
Some users encountered issues such as touch response problems on MIUI 12.5. Users also complain about overheating, slow performance, drop in framerate, unstable app function and files randomly missing from their phone's storage. The update to MIUI 13 brought several performance improvements.

=== Bloatware ===
Xiaomi devices running MIUI became controversial for including a lot of bloatware—obtrusive pre-installed unwanted software that uses system resources and slows operation. As of 14 November 2025, Universal Android Debloater Next Generation recommends uninstalling more than 193 different pre-installed apps on MIUI devices, excluding some AOSP packages. MIUI's replacement, HyperOS, has the same issues.

== Version history ==
An organisation named Xiaomi Europe, using the domain xiaomi.eu and working officially with Xiaomi despite not being affiliated with the Chinese company, was set up in 2010 as a community for English-language Xiaomi users with phones running MIUI, and later HyperOS, associated with an Android version, with discussion forums. The website issues its own debloated and improved versions of Xiaomi ROM images based on China ROMs for devices using Qualcomm Snapdragon hardware. Weekly beta versions of MIUI and HyperOS were also issued, but Xiaomi later stopped making their HyperOS beta code available. Installing a xiaomi.eu ROM image is technically challenging, requiring the bootloader to be unlocked and the firmware flashed.

xiaomi.eu say that their ROMs were approved by the official EU distributor ABC Data to not void warranty for devices sold by them. According to a xiaomi.eu leader in 2021, the official ROM must be flashed and the bootloader locked before returning a device for warranty repair.

There are other customised versions of MIUI and HyperOS for Xiaomi devices, and also other non-Xiaomi-based custom Android ROMs can be installed on Xiaomi phones.

Version	Screenshot	Android version	Date of release	Last Stable release	Initial Beta release	Last Beta release	Notable change
MIUI V1		2.1-2.2	16 August 2010	0.8.16	Unknown		Initial release
MIUI V2		2.1-2.3.6	29 October 2010	—N/a	Unknown	Unknown	Redesigned user interface
MIUI V3		2.3.6	25 March 2011	—N/a	Unknown	2.4.20	Redesigned user interface
MIUI V4		4.0.4 – 4.1.2	19 January 2012	ICS24.0	Unknown	3.2.22	New user interface; Added anti-virus
MIUI V5		4.1.2 – 4.4.2	1 March 2013	31.0	3.3.1	4.12.5	New user interface; Google Services were removed from the Chinese version
MIUI 6		4.4.2 – 5.0.2	29 August 2014	6.7.11.0	4.8.29	5.8.6	New user interface; Dropped devices running Android Jelly Bean or below
MIUI 7		4.4.2 – 6.0.1	13 August 2015	7.5.9.0	5.8.12	6.5.26	Locked bootloader on selected old devices and all released afterwards
MIUI 8		4.4.2 – 7.1.2	16 June 2016	8.5.16.0	6.6.16	7.7.20	Minor changes to the user interface; Updated system apps; Added support for Second Space and Dual apps.
MIUI 9		4.4.2 – 8.1.0	10 August 2017	9.6.19.0	7.8.10	8.5.24	Minor changes to the user interface; Added split screen; Improved Notification Shade and QuickCard (currently known as App Vault); New silent mode; Added key and gesture shortcuts; Added face unlock.
MIUI 10		6.0 – 9	19 June 2018	10.4.11.0	8.6.14	9.9.6	New notification shade; Extended notifications' functionality; New recent apps screen, volume control, Clock, Calendar and Notes; Higher integration with Xiaomi; Minor changes to the user interface; Removed black theme (Mi Note 2); Dropped devices running Android Lollipop or below
MIUI 11		7.0 – 10	22 October 2019	11.0.25.0	9.9.24	20.3.26	Dropped devices running Android Marshmallow; Based on Android 10 on some devices; System-wide dark mode, with dark mode scheduling.; Monochrome ultra power saving mode; Mi calculator (Pip mode); MIUI Notes App Download; New icons; Optional app drawer setting for system launcher; Smoother animations; Status bar optimizations; Automatic screenshot management; Added ultra battery saver (China); Opt Out Of Adverts Settings; China ROM only first
MIUI 12		9 – 11	27 April 2020	12.2.10.0	20.4.27	20.12.10	Dropped devices running Android Oreo or below; Dark Mode 2.0; New gestures and animations (Smoother animations, in boxes); New Icons; New notification shade; AI help for calls (automatic reply); Super Wallpaper (Planet zoom from always on display to Lockscreen to Homescreen); App drawer for first time; More privacy-focused; 1-time permission for location, contacts etc. in third-party apps; Added floating windows; Added ultra battery saver for the global version; Added Lite Mode; Added Video toolbox.; New fingerprint animations; New camera & gallery filters; Redesigned app vault
MIUI 12.5		10 – 12	28 December 2020	12.5.26.0	20.12.25	21.7.5	Dropped devices running Android Pie; New nature sounds of notifications; Smoother animations; Redesigned app folders; Added vertical layout for Recents (only on Android 11); Improvements for Mi Notes; Added new Super wallpapers ("Geometry" and "Mount Siguniang"); Added heart rate measure using the camera (China only); New Mi Notes icon
MIUI 13		11 – 13	28 December 2021	13.2.8.0 (Mainland China); 13.2.6.0 (Global Market)	21.7.6	13.1.22.10.25.DEV (Android 13 Weekly); 13.1.22.10.24.DEV (Android 12 Weekly); 22.11.23 (Daily Beta for some devices); 22.10.26 (Daily Beta)	Dropped devices running Android 10; Minor changes to the user interface; New widgets; New one-handed mode from Android 12; Redesigned App Vault; New Mi Sans font (China only); Redesigned Control center; New live wallpapers; Added sidebar (only phones); Redesigned Game Turbo and Video toolbox; Improved multitasking on tablets; Mi Smart Hub (China only); Redesigned Notes App; Improved fingerprint animations; Improved MIUI Launcher
MIUI 14		12 – 14	11 December 2022	14.1.10.0	14.0.22.12.5.DEV	14.0.23.10.15.DEV	Dropped devices running Android 11; Minor changes to the user interface; New widgets; New wallpapers; Super Icons (China only); Pets and animals (China only); Photon Engine; Razor Project; New family share features; MIUI Interconnect

== See also ==
- List of custom Android distributions
- Comparison of mobile operating systems
- List of free and open-source Android applications
