= Xiaomi Mi A3 =

Smartphones manufactured by Xiaomi

Xiaomi Mi A3 Xiaomi Mi CC9e
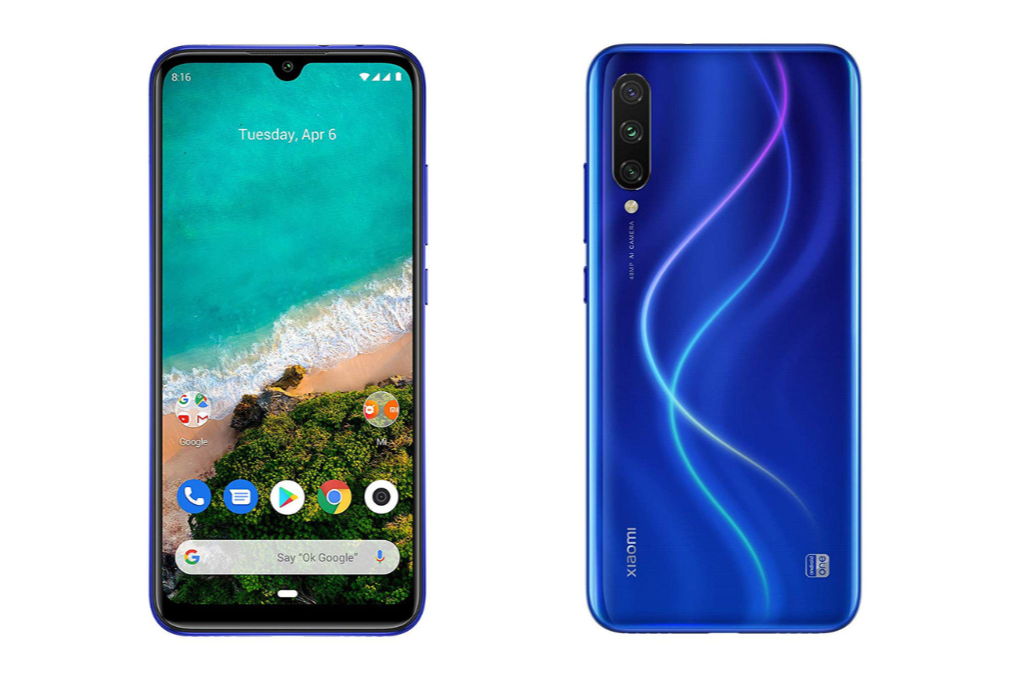
- Front and back view featuring iridescent "Not Just Blue" color scheme on glass back panel
- Manufacturer: Xiaomi
- Type: Smartphone
- Series: Mi A/Mi CC, Android One
- First released: Mi CC9e (in China): 2 July 2019; 6 years ago Mi A3 (global): 17 July 2019; 6 years ago
- Availability by region: July 2019; 6 years ago
- Predecessor: Xiaomi Mi A2 Lite
- Related: Xiaomi Mi CC9; Xiaomi Mi CC9 Pro
- Compatible networks: List of networks: Mi A3: GSM: 800/900/1800/1900; HSPA: 850 / 900 / 1700 (AWS) / 1900 / 2100; LTE: VoLTE 1 (2100), 2 (1900), 3 (1800), 4 (1700/2100), 5 (850), 7 (2600), 8 (900), 20 (800), 38 (2600), 39 (1900), 40 (2300), 41 (2500) Mi CC9e: GSM: 800/900/1800/1900; CDMA: 800; HSPA: 850 / 900 / 2100; LTE: VoLTE 1 (2100), 3 (1800), 5 (850), 8 (900), 34 (2000), 38 (2600), 39 (1900), 40 (2300), 41 (2500)
- Form factor: Slate
- Dimensions: 153.5 mm (6.04 in) H; 71.9 mm (2.83 in) W; 8.5 mm (0.33 in) D
- Weight: 173.8 g (6.1 oz)
- Operating system: List of OS versions: Mi A3: Original: Android 9 Pie; Current: Android 11 Mi CC9e: Original: Android 9 Pie with MIUI 10; Current: Android 10 with MIUI 12.5
- System-on-chip: Qualcomm SDM665 Snapdragon 665
- CPU: Octa-core (4x2.0 GHz Kryo 260 Gold & 4x1.8 GHz Kryo 260 Silver)
- GPU: Adreno 610
- Memory: 4/6 GB
- Storage: 64/128 GB
- Removable storage: microSDXC
- Battery: Non-removable Li-Po 4030 mAh
- Charging: 18W fast charging QC3
- Rear camera: Triple 48/8/2 MP phase detection autofocus, LED flash
- Front camera: 32 MP 0.8 μm pixel size, geo-tagging, touch focus, face detection, HDR, panorama
- Display: 6.088 in (154.6 mm) Super AMOLED capacitive touchscreen, 720 x 1560 pixels, ~286 ppi, 16M colors
- Model: Mi A3: M1906F9SH, M1906F9SI; Mi CC9e: M1906F9SC
- Codename: Mi A3: laurel_sprout Mi CC9e: laurus

The Xiaomi Mi A3 is the fourth iteration in the Mi A series smartphones developed by Xiaomi and co-developed by Google as part of its Android One initiative.

== Specifications ==
=== Hardware ===
The phone features a 6.088 inch HD+ (1560 x 720 pixel) resolution, 283ppi Super AMOLED display with a 60 Hz refresh rate, a glass and plastic body, with Corning Gorilla Glass 5 protection on its front as well as its back. It is powered by a Qualcomm Snapdragon 665 SoC. It also has a 2.0, Type-C 1.0 reversible connector.

It has an AI assisted triple rear camera setup. The main camera has a 48MP Sony IMX586 sensor; there are also the 8MP ultrawide and 2MP depth sensing cameras. The front camera has a resolution of 32MP. The battery has a capacity of 4030mAh, which supports 18W quick charging via Qualcomm Quick Charge 3.0.

=== Software ===
The Xiaomi Mi A3 is part of the Android One program, where software updates are provided directly from Google.

The phone comes with Android 9 "Pie" preinstalled. An Android 10 update was released on 29 February but rolled back due to bugs. It was re-released again on 18 March. On 31 December 2020 Xiaomi released Android 11 update, but it bricked every device it was installed on. Xiaomi fixed the issue within a week, but so far they have not told the reason for the failed update.

=== Release ===
The Xiaomi Mi A3 is a re-branded Xiaomi Mi CC9e smartphone, that comes with Android One instead of MIUI on the Mi CC9e. The Xiaomi Mi CC9e is a version meant for China, while the Xiaomi Mi A3 is the global version of the Mi CC9e. The Xiaomi Mi CC9e was first released in July 2019, only a couple of weeks before the Mi A3.
