= Xiaomi Mi Pad =

2014 tablet computer by Xiaomi

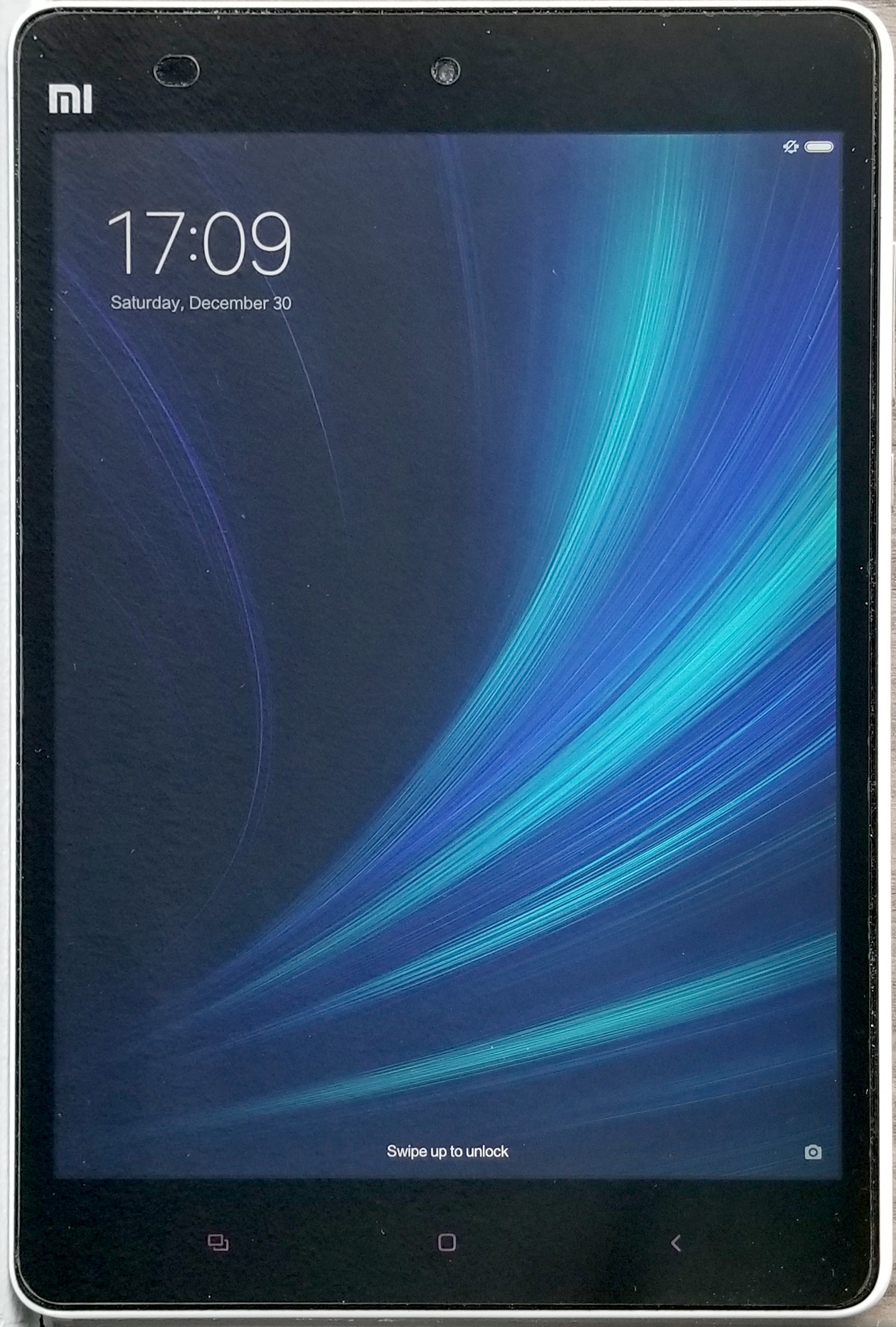
- Manufacturer: Xiaomi
- Product family: Mi Pad
- Type: Tablet computer
- Released: May 2014; 12 years ago
- Media: Audio: MP3, AAC, AAC+, eAAC+ Video: MP4, H.264, H.263
- Operating system: Android v4.4.4 Kitkat with MIUI 9.2.4.0 (stable)
- System on a chip: Nvidia Tegra K1
- CPU: Quad-core 2.2 GHz Cortex-A15
- Memory: 2 GB
- Storage: 16/64 GB
- Removable storage: Supports up to 128 GB microSD
- Display: 7.9 in (200 mm) IPS LCD; 1536×2048 px
- Graphics: ULP GeForce Kepler (192 cores)
- Input: Multi-touch capacitive touchscreen; Accelerometer; A-GPS; Digital compass; Proximity sensor; Push buttons; capacitive touch-sensitive buttons
- Camera: 8 Megapixel auto-focus with LED flash
- Connectivity: GPS / GLONASS, Wi-Fi 802.11 b/g/n, Bluetooth 4.0, Micro-USB
- Power: 6,700 mAh, internal rechargeable Li-Po
- Dimensions: H: 202 mm (8.0 in); W: 135.4 mm (5.33 in); D: 8.5 mm (0.33 in)
- Weight: 360 g (13 oz)
- Successor: Xiaomi Mi Pad 2
- Website: web.archive.org/web/20180327091247/http://www.mi.com/in/mipad/ www.mi.com/in/mipad/

The Xiaomi Mi Pad is a tablet computer produced by Xiaomi. It is Xiaomi's first tablet and is manufactured by Foxconn. The device is available in two storage sizes, 16 GB and 64 GB.

Reviewers praised the tablet for its high performance hardware at low price point while noting that the design of the tablet felt like a cross between iPad mini and iPhone 5C.

== Release ==
The Mi Pad was first unveiled during a Xiaomi launch event on 5 May 2014. It was launched in India on 25 March 2015.

Xiaomi CEO Lei Jun told Richard Lai from Engadget around 2012 that he wasn't sure about making a tablet, but on 15 May 2015 he confessed that he had been quietly developing one this whole time.

=== Kernel Source Code Release ===
The Source Code for the kernel used in the OS of the tablet was released in November 2016, approximately 2 years after the device release. The modified source code of kernel which is licensed under GPLv2 is required by license to be released.

== Features ==
=== Hardware ===
- 7.9" 1536 x 2048 IPS LCD of 324 ppi, Gorilla Glass 3
- Nvidia Tegra K1 chipset, 2 GB of RAM
- Quad-core 2.2 GHz Cortex-A15 processor

The Mi Pad has a 7.9-inch screen, with a resolution of 1536 x 2048 which results in a pixel density of 324 ppi. Mi Pad is the first tablet released in the market with Nvidia Tegra K1 chipset, a chip Nvidia claims that outperforms both the Xbox 360 and the PS3, whilst consuming significantly less power. Mi Pad uses Corning Gorilla Glass 3 on its display and palm detection technology to prevent accidental taps while holding the tablet.

=== Software ===
- Android 4.4.4 (KitKat) with MIUI 7.5 customization skin.
- Last update brings MIUI 9.2, but it is still based on Android 4.4.4 (KitKat).
- This tablet comes without a locked bootloader, so users can flash custom ROMs on it.

== Reception ==
=== Critical ===
The device was favorably reviewed by Digit (magazine) and Eurogamer. With Richard Leadbetter from Eurogamer writing:

We have the most powerful mobile chipset on the planet within an iPad mini form-factor, put together by one of the few true enthusiast-friendly OEMs working today.

Vlad Savov from The Verge praised the device for its competitive pricing and for being the first device in market to use Nvidia Tegra K1 SoC which Nvidia claimed was more powerful than the Xbox 360 and PS3. The device was labeled "UNAPOLOGETICALLY DERIVATIVE" for its similarities to Apple iPad mini & Apple iPhone 5c.

Dominic Basulto from Washington Post called Xiaomi's product(s) cheap and high quality while also calling the MiPad a me-too product, referring to its similarity to iPad.

James Vincent from The Verge while pointing out general similarity between Apple & Xiaomi products, pointed out that Mi Pad has the same screen resolution & size as an iPad mini.

Hugo Barra, (Vice President of Xiaomi at the time of Mi Pad's release) defended against the accusation of design similarities to Apple products, with Vlad Savov from The Verge quoting Barra:

If you have two similarly skilled designers, it makes sense that they would reach the same conclusion, It doesn't matter if somebody else has reached the same conclusion" about, for example, a 4:3 screen ratio being preferable to the more cinematic 16:9 that most Android tablets offer. Mi is focused on making the best products that it can and refuses to shy away from a good idea just because Apple might have done it already. "We're not copying Apple's products. End of story."

Matt Burns from TechCrunch pointed to marketing strategy similarity between Xiaomi MiPad and Apple iPad & iPhone 5c.

Cyrus Farivar and Ron Amadeo from Ars Technica pointed to Xiaomi's plans to "take over the world" with low cost and high performance tablet & handsets, referring to low profit per device to increase market share.

Stephanie Mlot from PC Mag pointed to the large price difference between same-size Apple iPad which ranges from $399 to $929, depending on model, capacity, and network options, as compared to Mi Pad with launch price of the Wi-Fi-only 16 GB version being $240 (1,499 Chinese yuan) and the larger 64 GB model being priced at $272 (1,699 Chinese yuan).

=== Commercial ===
The initial 50,000 unit allocated sold-out right after it went on sale.

The tablet was competitively priced at 1,499 Chinese Yuan (about $241) for the 16 GB model, and 1,699 Chinese Yuan (about $273) for the 64 GB version.

== Legal Issues ==
=== Mi Pad Trademark Dispute ===
Xiaomi initially sold the Mi Pad only in China, but with an eye on international expansion it applied for an EU trademark in 2014. Apple lodged a formal complaint with the EU Intellectual Property Office (EUIPO), which was upheld.

The matter subsequently went to court, and Reuters reported that Apple has won the case.

The Court said in a statement,

“The dissimilarity between the signs at issue, resulting from the presence of the additional letter ‘m’ at the beginning of “Mi Pad”, is not sufficient to offset the high degree of visual and phonetic similarity between the two signs,”

The court agreed with the EUIPO's decision and said,

English-speaking consumers were likely to understand the prefix “mi” as meaning “my” and therefore pronounce the “i” of Mi Pad and iPad in the same way.

It's a partial victory because it doesn't prohibit Xiaomi from continuing to use the name either in Europe or elsewhere; it only prevents it being registered as a European trademark. Ironically, it would leave Xiaomi open to a third-party company using the name there.

Xiaomi can appeal against the ruling at the EU's highest court, the Court of Justice of the European Union.

== Successive Devices ==
Mi Pad currently (as of 2021) have 5 successive devices, namely:

- Mi Pad 2 (November 2015)
- Mi Pad 3 (April 2017)
- Mi Pad 4 (June 2018)
- Mi Pad 4 Plus (August 2018)
- Xiaomi Pad 5 & Pad 5 Pro (August 2021)
- Xiaomi Pad 6 & Pad 6 Pro (April 2023)
- Xiaomi Pad 7 & Pad 7 Pro (2024)
- Xiaomi Pad 8 & Pad 8 Pro (2026)

=== Mi Pad 2 ===
MiPad was followed up by MiPad 2, released in November 2015. The device unlike its predecessor had Windows 10 as an option for its OS besides MIUI Android ROM.
