= List of Xiaomi products =

Xiaomi products logo

Xiaomi produces smartphones (Xiaomi, Redmi, Poco and Black Shark brands), tablets, laptops, wearable devices, TVs, routers, and other smart home devices on their web store and on third-party websites. Some of their products are listed below.

== Software ==
=== MIUI ===
Xiaomi's smartphones run MIUI, Xiaomi's earliest known product, a stock and aftermarket Android firmware for smartphones and tablet computers based on the open-source Android operating system. It is available on Xiaomi devices and devices made by other companies. However, Xiaomi officially announced its new HyperOS software on 17 October 2023, and made its debut on 26 October 2023, with the release of the Xiaomi 14 series in China. It was designed to replace MIUI, unifying Xiaomi's ecosystem of smartphones, IoT devices, and automobiles. Xiaomi has recently announced that it will release HyperOS 4 in August 2026, where the Xiaomi 17 series and Xiaomi 15T Pro are rumoured to be the first devices to run on the new version.

=== Xiaomi Cloud ===
Xiaomi Cloud (formerly known as Mi Cloud) is a cloud storage and cloud computing service created by Xiaomi. The service allows users to store data such as contacts, messages, photos and notes on remote computer servers for download to multiple devices running MIUI operating system. The service also includes a feature that allows users to track the location of their MIUI device as well as alarm, lock or reset it. Xiaomi Cloud service is available public to connect directly through web or using your Xiaomi device.

=== Mi Talk ===
Mi Talk was an internet-based cross-platform instant messenger mobile app available for Android and iOS, that launched in 2011. On 19 January 2021, Xiaomi announced Mi Talk would be discontinued in a message sent to all users, with the messaging functionality of the app being disabled on 1 February the same year. The whole service was discontinued on 19 February.

== Smartphones ==
=== Xiaomi brand ===
Xiaomi's flagship mobile handset line is the Xiaomi brand (formerly known as Mi series), which focuses on the high-end smartphone market.

The Mi 3 uses a modified Qualcomm Snapdragon 800 and was found on a test to be the world's fastest Android smartphone according to benchmark testing apps Antutu, Quadrant, and Geekbench.

Xiaomi showed its ceramic Mi 5 on 24 February at MWC 2016. It supports NFC and a mobile payment function Mi Pay launched in April 2016. On 27 September 2016, Xiaomi released the Mi 5s and Mi 5s Plus.

On 4 November 2016, Xiaomi released the Mi MIX. The MI MIX has a 91.3% screen to body ratio, achieved by removing all the top-mounted sensors: the proximity sensor has been replaced by ultrasound, the earpiece has been replaced by a piezoelectric speaker that uses the metal frame to generate sound, and the front-facing camera is relocated to the bottom.

The Xiaomi Mi 5c was launched in February 2017, the first phone with Xiaomi's in-house processor, Pinecone Surge S1.

Xiaomi Mi 9 was launched on 20 February 2019 in Beijing, China. This is Xiaomi's first triple camera smartphone. It is powered by Snapdragon 855 SoC with 8GB RAM.

Xiaomi Mi 10 was announced on 13 February 2020. This is Xiaomi's first phone with a Super-AMOLED display with a high refresh rate. This phone is powered by the Qualcomm Snapdragon 865 processor. Xiaomi Mi 10 Ultra was announced on 11 August 2020. This is Xiaomi's first phone to support 120-watt wired charging.

Xiaomi 12T and 12T Pro was launched on 4 October 2022. Xiaomi 12T Pro is the first Xiaomi phone with 200 MP camera.

Xiaomi 15 Ultra was announced in January 2025, continuing Xiaomi's trend of high-end flagship devices. It features a Snapdragon 8 Elite processor, a 200MP periscope telephoto camera, and a 5,500mAh battery with 120W fast charging. With an IP69 rating and a peak brightness of 3,000 nits, it stands out as one of the most durable and high-performance Xiaomi devices to date.

On 25 December 2025, in China, alongside the Xiaomi 17 Ultra, Xiaomi introduced the Xiaomi 17 Ultra Leica Edition.

==== Current ====
===== Xiaomi series =====
Model	Codename	Release date	Display type	Display size	Display resolution	4G LTE support	5G support	SoC	GPU	RAM	Internal Storage	Camera		Battery	Operating system	
Model	Codename	Release date	Display type	Display size	Display resolution	4G LTE support	5G support	SoC	GPU	RAM	Internal Storage	Rear	Front	Battery	Initial	Latest
Mi 1	mione	August 2011	TFT LCD	4"	480 x 854 (~245 ppi)	No	No	Qualcomm Snapdragon S3 2x 1.5 GHz	Adreno 220 @266 MHz	1 GB (LPDDR2)	4 GB	8 MP	2 MP	1930 mAh (Li-Ion)	Android 2.3.6 (MIUI V2.3)	Android 4.1.2 (MIUI V5)
Mi 1 Youth	mione	May 2012	TFT LCD	4"	480 x 854 (~245 ppi)	No	No	Qualcomm Snapdragon S3 2x 1.2 GHz	Adreno 220 @266 MHz	1 GB (LPDDR2)	4 GB	8 MP	N/A	1930 mAh (Li-Ion)	Android 4.0.4 (MIUI V4)	Android 4.1.2 (MIUI V5)
Mi 1S	mione_plus	August 2012	TFT LCD	4"	480 x 854 (~245 ppi)	No	No	Qualcomm Snapdragon S3 2x 1.7 GHz	Adreno 220 @266 MHz	1 GB (LPDDR2)	4 GB	8 MP	2 MP	1930 mAh (Li-Ion)	Android 4.0.4 (MIUI V4)	Android 4.4.4 (MIUI 8)
Mi 1S Youth	mione_plus	October 2012	TFT LCD	4"	480 x 854 (~245 ppi)	No	No	Qualcomm Snapdragon S3 2x 1.5 GHz	Adreno 220 @266 MHz	1 GB (LPDDR2)	4 GB	8 MP	2 MP	1930 mAh (Li-Ion)	Android 4.0.4 (MIUI V4)	Android 4.4.4 (MIUI 8)
Mi 2	aries	August 2012	IPS LCD	4.3"	720 x 1280 (~342 ppi)	No	No	Qualcomm Snapdragon S4 Pro 4x 1.5 GHz	Adreno 320 @400 MHz	2 GB (LPDDR2)	16 GB; 32 GB	8 MP, f/2.0	2 MP	2000 mAh (Li-Ion)	Android 4.1.1 (MIUI V4)	Android 5.0.2 (MIUI 9)
Mi 2S	aries	April 2013	IPS LCD	4.3"	720 x 1280 (~342 ppi)	No	No	Qualcomm Snapdragon 600 4x 1.7 GHz	Adreno 320 @400 MHz	2 GB (LPDDR3)	16 GB; 32 GB	8 MP, f/2.2 (16 GB version) 13 MP, f/2.2 (32 GB version)	2 MP	2000 mAh (Li-Ion)	Android 4.1.1 (MIUI V5)	Android 5.0.2 (MIUI 9)
Mi 2A	taurus	April 2013	IPS LCD	4.5"	720 x 1280 (~326 ppi)	No	No	Qualcomm Snapdragon S4 Pro 2x 1.7 GHz	Adreno 320 @400 MHz	1 GB (LPDDR2)	16 GB	8 MP, f/2.0	2 MP	2030 mAh (Li-Ion)	Android 4.1.1 (MIUI V5)	Android 4.4.4 (MIUI 7)
Mi 3	cancro	September 2013	IPS LCD Corning Gorilla Glass 3	5"	1080 x 1920 (~441 ppi)	No	No	Qualcomm Snapdragon 800 4x 2.3 GHz	Adreno 330 @578 MHz	2 GB (LPDDR3)	16 GB; 64 GB (eMMC 4.5)	13 MP, f/2.2	2 MP, f/2.2	3050 mAh (Li-Ion)	Android 4.3 (MIUI V5)	Android 6.0.1 (MIUI 10)
Mi 3 TD	pisces	October 2013	IPS LCD Corning Gorilla Glass 3	5"	1080 x 1920 (~441 ppi)	No	No	NVIDIA Tegra 4 4x 1.8 GHz Cortex-A15 + 1x Cortex-A9		2 GB (LPDDR3)	16 GB; 64 GB (eMMC 4.5)	13 MP, f/2.2	2 MP, f/2.2	3050 mAh (Li-Ion)	Android 4.2.2 (MIUI V5)	Android 5.0 (MIUI 9)
Mi 4	cancro	August 2014	IPS LCD	5"	1080 x 1920 (~441 ppi)	Yes (4G version)	No	Qualcomm Snapdragon 801 4x 2.45 GHz	Adreno 330 @578 MHz	3 GB (WDCMA version) 2 GB, 3 GB (4G version) (LPDDR3)	16 GB, 64 GB (WDCMA version) 16 GB, 32 GB, 64 GB (4G version) (eMMC 5.0)	13 MP, f/1.8	8 MP, f/1.8	3080 mAh (Li-Ion)	Android 4.4.2 (MIUI V5)	Android 6.0.1 (MIUI 10)
Mi 4i	ferrari	April 2015	IPS LCD	5"	1080 x 1920 (~441 ppi)	Yes	No	Qualcomm Snapdragon 615 4x 1.7 GHz Cortex-A53 + 4x 1 GHz Cortex-A53	Adreno 405 @550 MHz	2 GB (LPDDR3)	16 GB; 32 GB (eMMC 4.5)	13 MP, f/1.8	8 MP, f/1.8	3120 mAh (Li-Ion)	Android 5.0.2 (MIUI 6)	Android 7.0 (MIUI 9)
Mi 4c	libra	September 2015	IPS LCD	5"	1080 x 1920 (~441 ppi)	Yes	No	Qualcomm Snapdragon 808 2x 1.82 GHz Cortex-A57+ 4x 1.44 GHz Cortex-A53	Adreno 418 @600 MHz	2 GB; 3 GB (LPDDR3)	16 GB; 32 GB (eMMC 5.0)	13 MP, f/1.8	8 MP, f/1.8	3080 mAh (Li-Ion)	Android 5.1.1 (MIUI 7)	Android 7.0 (MIUI 10)
Mi 4S	aqua	March 2016	IPS LCD	5"	1080 x 1920 (~441 ppi)	Yes	No	Qualcomm Snapdragon 808 2x 1.82 GHz Cortex-A57+ 4x 1.44 GHz Cortex-A53	Adreno 418 @600 MHz	3 GB (LPDDR3)	64 GB (eMMC 5.0)	13 MP, f/1.8	8 MP, f/1.8	3260 mAh (Li-Ion)	Android 5.1.1 (MIUI 7)	Android 7.0 (MIUI 10)
Mi 5	gemini	April 2016	IPS LCD Corning Gorilla Glass 4	5.15"	1080 x 1920 (~428 ppi)	Yes	No	Qualcomm Snapdragon 820 2x 1.8 GHz + 2x 1.36 GHz	Adreno 530 @510 MHz	3 GB (LPDDR4)	32 GB (UFS 2.0)	16 MP, f/2.0	4 MP, f/2.0	3000 mAh (Li-Po)	Android 6.0.1 (MIUI 7)	Android 8.0 (MIUI 10)
Mi 5 Prime / Pro	gemini	April 2016	IPS LCD Corning Gorilla Glass 4	5.15"	1080 x 1920 (~428 ppi)	Yes	No	Qualcomm Snapdragon 820 2.15 GHz + 1.6 GHz	Adreno 530 @624 MHz	3 GB (Prime edition) 4 GB (Pro edition) (LPDDR4)	64 GB (Prime edition) 128 GB (Pro edition) (UFS 2.0)	16 MP, f/2.0	4 MP, f/2.0		Android 6.0.1 (MIUI 7)	Android 8.0 (MIUI 10)
Mi 5s	capricorn	October 2016	IPS LCD Corning Gorilla Glass 4	5.15"	1080 x 1920 (~428 ppi)	Yes	No	Qualcomm Snapdragon 821 2x 2.15 GHz + 2x 1.6 GHz	Adreno 530 @624 MHz	3 GB; 4 GB (LPDDR4)	64 GB; 128 GB	12 MP, f/2.0	4 MP, f/2.0	3200 mAh (Li-Ion)	Android 6.0.1 (MIUI 8)	Android 8.0 (MIUI 11)
Mi 5s Plus	natrium	October 2016	IPS LCD Corning Gorilla Glass 4	5.7"	1080 x 1920 (~428 ppi)	Yes	No	Qualcomm Snapdragon 821 2x 2.35 GHz + 2x 1.6 GHz	Adreno 530 @653 MHz	4 GB; 6 GB (LPDDR4)	64 GB; 128 GB	13 MP, f/2.0 + 13 MP	4 MP, f/2.0	3800 mAh (Li-Ion)	Android 6.0.1 (MIUI 8)	Android 8.0 (MIUI 11)
Mi 5c	meri	March 2017	IPS LCD Corning Gorilla Glass 4	5.15"	1080 x 1920 (~428 ppi)	Yes	No	Xiaomi Surge S1 4x 2.2 GHz Cortex-A53 + 4x 1.4 GHz Cortex-A53	Mali-T860 MP4 @800 MHz	3 GB (LPDDR3)	64 GB	12 MP, f/2.2	8 MP, f/2.0	2860 mAh (Li-Ion)	Android 6.0.1 (MIUI 8)	Android 7.1.2 (MIUI 11)
Mi 5X Mi A1	tiffany	August 2017 September 2017 (Mi A1)	IPS LCD Corning Gorilla Glass 3	5.5"	1080 x 1920 (~403 ppi)	Yes	No	Qualcomm Snapdragon 625 8x 2 GHz Cortex-A53	Adreno 506 @650 MHz	4 GB (LPDDR3)	32 GB; 64 GB (eMMC 5.1)	12 MP + 12 MP (telephoto)	5 MP	3080 mAh (Li-Po)	Android 7.1.2 (Android One)	Android 9 (Android One)
Mi 6	sagit	April 2017	IPS LCD Corning Gorilla Glass 4	5.15"	1080 x 1920 (~428 ppi)	Yes	No	Qualcomm Snapdragon 835 4x 2.45 GHz & 4x 1.9 GHz	Adreno 540 @710 MHz	4 GB; 6 GB (LPDDR4X)	64 GB; 128 GB (eMMC 5.1)	12 MP, f/1.8 + 12 MP, f/2.6 (telephoto)	8 MP	3350 mAh (Li-Po)	Android 7.1.1 (MIUI 8	Android 9 (MIUI 11)
Mi 6X Mi A2	wayne	April 2018 July 2018 (Mi A2)	IPS LCD	5.99"	1080 x 2160 (~403 ppi)	Yes	No	Qualcomm Snapdragon 660 4x 2.2 GHz Cortex-A73 + 4x 1.8 GHz Cortex-A53	Adreno 512 @650 MHz	4 GB; 6 GB (LPDDR4)	32 GB; 64 GB; 128 GB (eMMC 5.1)	12 MP, f/1.8 + 20 MP, f/1.8	20 MP, f/1.8 20 MP, f/2.2 (Mi A2)	3000 mAh (Li-Po)	Android 8.1 (Android One)	Android 9 (Android One)
Mi 8	dipper	June 2018	AMOLED Corning Gorilla Glass 4	6.21"	1080 x 2248 (~402 ppi)	Yes	No	Qualcomm Snapdragon 845 4x 2.8 GHz + 4x 1.8 GHz	Adreno 630 @710 MHz	6 GB; 8 GB (LPDDR4X)	64 GB; 128 GB; 256 GB (UFS 2.1)	12 MP, f/1.8 + 12 MP, f/2.4 (telephoto)	20 MP, f/2.0	3400 mAh (Li-Po)	Android 8.1 (MIUI 9)	Android 10 (MIUI 12.5)
Mi 8 SE	sirius	June 2018	Super AMOLED Corning Gorilla Glass 5	5.88"	1080 x 2244 (~423 ppi)	Yes	No	Qualcomm Snapdragon 710 2x 2.2 GHz Cortex-A75 + 6x 1.7 GHz Cortex-A55	Adreno 616 @750 MHz	4 GB; 6 GB (LPDDR4X)	64 GB; 128 GB	12 MP + 5 MP, f/2.0 (depth)	20 MP, f/2.0	3120 mAh (Li-Po)	Android 8.1 (MIUI 9)	Android 10 (MIUI 12.5)
Mi 8 Explorer	ursa	July 2018	Super AMOLED Corning Gorilla Glass 5	6.21"	1080 x 2248 (~402 ppi)	Yes	No	Qualcomm Snapdragon 845 4x 2.8 GHz + 4x 1.8 GHz	Adreno 630 @710 MHz	8 GB (LPDDR4X)	128 GB	12 MP, f/1.8 + 12 MP, f/2.4	20 MP, f/2.0	3000 mAh (Li-Po)	Android 8.1 (MIUI 9)	Android 10 (MIUI 12.5)
Mi A2 Lite	daisy	July 2018	IPS LCD	5.84"	1080 x 2280 (~432 ppi)	Yes	No	Qualcomm Snapdragon 625 8x 2.0 GHz	Adreno 506 @650 MHz	3 GB; 4 GB (LPDDR3)	32 GB; 64 GB (eMMC 5.1)	12 MP, f/2.2 + 5 MP, f/2.2 (depth)	5 MP, f/2.0	4000 mAh (Li-Po)	Android 8.1 (Android One)	Android 10 (Android One)
Mi 8 Lite	platina	September 2018	IPS LCD	6.26"	1080 x 2280 (~403 ppi)	Yes	No	Qualcomm Snapdragon 660 4x 2.2 GHz Cortex-A73 + 4x 1.84 GHz Cortex-A53	Adreno 512 @650 MHz	4 GB; 6 GB (LPDDR4)	64 GB; 128 GB (eMMC 5.1)	12 MP, f/1.9 + 5 MP, f/2.0 (depth)	24 MP, f/2.0	3350 mAh (Li-Po)	Android 8.1 (MIUI 9)	Android 10 (MIUI 12.5)
Mi 8 Pro	equuleus	September 2018	Super AMOLED Corning Gorilla Glass 5	6.21"	1080 x 2248 (~402 ppi)	Yes	No	Qualcomm Snapdragon 845 4x 2.8 GHz + 4x 1.8 GHz	Adreno 630 @710 MHz	6 GB; 8 GB (LPDDR4X)	128 GB (UFS 2.1)	12 MP, f/1.8 + 12 MP, f/2.4	20 MP, f/2.0	3000 mAh (Li-Po)	Android 8.1 (MIUI 9)	Android 10 (MIUI 12.5)
Mi 9	cepheus	March 2019	Super AMOLED Corning Gorilla Glass 5	6.39"	1080 x 2340 (~403 ppi)	Yes	No	Qualcomm Snapdragon 855 1x 2.84 GHz Cortex-A76 + 3x 2.42 GHz Cortex-A76 + 4x 1.80 GHz Cortex-A55	Adreno 640 @585 MHz	6 GB; 8 GB (LPDDR4X)	64 GB; 128 GB (UFS 2.1)	48 MP, f/1.8 + 12 MP, f/2.2 (telephoto) + 16 MP, f/2.2 (ultrawide)	20 MP, f/2.0	3300 mAh (Li-Po)	Android 9 (MIUI 10)	Android 11 (MIUI 13)
Mi 9 SE	grus	March 2019	Super AMOLED Corning Gorilla Glass 5	5.97"	1080 x 2340 (~432 ppi)	Yes	No	Qualcomm Snapdragon 712 2x 2.3 GHz Cortex-A75 + 6x 1.7 GHz Cortex-A55	Adreno 616 @750 MHz	6 GB (LPDDR4X)	64 GB; 128 GB; 256 GB (UFS 2.0)	48 MP, f/1.8 + 8 MP, f/2.4 (telephoto) + 13 MP, f/2.4 (ultrawide)	20 MP, f/2.0	3070 mAh (Li-Po)	Android 9 (MIUI 10)	Android 11 (MIUI 13)
Mi 9 Transparent	cepheus	June 2019	Super AMOLED Corning Gorilla Glass 5	6.39"	1080 x 2340 (~403 ppi)	Yes	No	Qualcomm Snapdragon 855 1x 2.84 GHz Cortex-A76 + 3x 2.42 GHz Cortex-A76 + 4x 1.80 GHz Cortex-A55	Adreno 640 @585 MHz	8 GB; 12 GB (LPDDR4X)	256 GB (UFS 2.1)	48 MP + 12 MP, f/2.2 (telephoto) + 16 MP, f/2.2 (ultrawide)	20 MP, f/2.0	3300 mAh (Li-Po)	Android 9 (MIUI 10)	Android 11 (MIUI 13)
Mi CC9 Global: Mi 9 Lite	pyxis	July 2019	Super AMOLED Corning Gorilla Glass 5	6.39"	1080 x 2340 (~403 ppi)	Yes	No	Qualcomm Snapdragon 710 2x 2.2 GHz Cortex-A75 + 6x 1.7 GHz Cortex-A55	Adreno 616 @750 MHz	6 GB; 8 GB (LPDDR4X)	64 GB; 128 GB; 256 GB (UFS 2.1)	48 MP, f/1.8 + 8 MP, f/2.2 (ultrawide) + 2 MP, f/2.4 (depth)	32 MP, f/2.0	4030 mAh (Li-Po)	Android 9 (MIUI 10)	Android 11 (MIUI 12.5)
Mi CC9e Global: Mi A3	laurus	July 2019	Super AMOLED Corning Gorilla Glass 5	6.01"	720 x 1560 (~286 ppi)	Yes	No	Qualcomm Snapdragon 665 4x 2.0 GHz Cortex-A73 + 4x 1.8 GHz Cortex-A53	Adreno 610 @950 MHz	4 GB; 6 GB	64 GB; 128 GB (eMMC 5.1)	48 MP, f/1.8 + 8 MP, f/2.2 (ultrawide) + 2 MP, f/2.4 (depth)	32 MP, f/2.0	4030 mAh (Li-Po)	Android 9 (MIUI 10)	Android 10 (MIUI 12.5)
Mi A3China: Mi CC9e	laurel_sprout	July 2019	Super AMOLED Corning Gorilla Glass 5	6.09"	720 x 1560 (~282 ppi)	Yes	No	Qualcomm Snapdragon 665 4x 2.0 GHz Cortex-A73 + 4x 1.8 GHz Cortex-A53	Adreno 610 @950 MHz	4 GB; 6 GB	64 GB; 128 GB; 256 GB (UFS 2.1)	48 MP, f/1.8 + 8 MP, f/2.2 (ultrawide) + 2 MP, f/2.4 (depth)	32 MP, f/2.0	4030 mAh (Li-Po)	Android 9 (Android One)	Android 11 (Android One)
Mi 9 Lite China: Mi CC9	pyxis	September 2019		6.39"	1080 x 2340 (~403 ppi)	Yes	No	Qualcomm Snapdragon 710 2x 2.2 GHz Cortex-A75 + 6x 1.7 GHz Cortex-A55	Adreno 616 @750 MHz	6 GB (LPDDR4X)	128 GB (UFS 2.1)	48 MP, f/1.8 + 8 MP, f/2.2 (ultrawide) + 2 MP, f/2.4 (depth)	32 MP, f/2.0	4030 mAh (Li-Po)	Android 9 (MIUI 10)	Android 11 (MIUI 12.5)
Mi 9 Pro 5G	crux	September 2019	Super AMOLED Corning Gorilla Glass 6	6.39"	1080 x 2340 (~403 ppi)	Yes	Yes	Qualcomm Snapdragon 855+ 1x 2.96 GHz + 3x 2.42 GHz + 4x 1.80 GHz	Adreno 640 @675 MHz	8 GB; 12 GB (LPDDR4X)	128 GB; 256 GB; 512 GB (UFS 3.0)	48 MP, f/1.8 + 12 MP, f/2.2 (telephoto) + 16 MP, f/2.2 (ultrawide)	20 MP, f/2.0	4000 mAh (Li-Po)	Android 10 (MIUI 11)	Android 11 (MIUI 13)
Mi CC9 Pro Global: Mi Note 10/Pro	tucana	November 2019	AMOLED Corning Gorilla Glass 5	6.47"	1080 x 2340 (~398 ppi)	Yes	No	Qualcomm Snapdragon 730 2x 2.2 GHz Cortex-A76 + 6x 1.8 GHz Cortex-A55	Adreno 618 @700 MHz	6 GB; 8 GB (LPDDR4X)	128 GB; 256 GB (UFS 2.1)	108 MP + 12 MP, f/2.0 (telephoto) + 5 MP, f/2.0 (telephoto) + 20 MP, f/2.2 (ultrawide) + 2 MP, f/2.4 (macro)	32 MP, f/2.0	5260 mAh (Li-Po)	Android 9 (MIUI 11)	Android 11 (MIUI 13)
Mi 10	umi	February 2020	Super AMOLED, 90 Hz Corning Gorilla Glass 5	6.67"	1080 x 2340 (~386 ppi)	Yes	Yes	Qualcomm Snapdragon 865 1x 3.1 GHz + 3x 2.42 GHz + 4x 1.80 GHz	Adreno 650 @587 MHz	8 GB; 12 GB	128 GB; 256 GB (UFS 3.0)	108 MP, f/1.7 + 13 MP, f/2.4 (ultrawide) + 2 MP, f/2.4 (macro) + 2 MP, f/2.4 (depth)	20 MP, f/2.0	4780 mAh (Li-Po)	Android 10 (MIUI 11)	Android 13 (Xiaomi HyperOS)
Mi 10 Pro	cmi	February 2020	Super AMOLED, 90 Hz Corning Gorilla Glass 5	6.67"	1080 x 2340 (~386 ppi)	Yes	Yes	Qualcomm Snapdragon 865 1x 3.1 GHz + 3x 2.42 GHz + 4x 1.80 GHz	Adreno 650 @587 MHz	8 GB; 12 GB	256 GB; 512 GB	108 MP, f/1.7 + 12 MP, f/2.0 (telephoto) + 8 MP, f/2.0 (telephoto) + 20 MP, f/2.2 (ultrawide)	20 MP, f/2.0	4500 mAh (Li-Po)	Android 10 (MIUI 11)	Android 13 (Xiaomi HyperOS)
Mi 10 Lite Zoom	vangogh	May 2020	Super AMOLED Corning Gorilla Glass 5	6.57"	1080 x 2400 (~401 ppi)	Yes	Yes	Qualcomm Snapdragon 765G 1x 2.4 GHz Cortex-A76 + 1x 2.2 GHz Cortex-A76 + 6x 1.8 GHz Cortex-A55	Adreno 620 @750 MHz	6 GB; 8 GB (LPDDR4X)	64 GB; 128 GB; 256 GB (UFS 2.1)	48 MP, f/1.8 + 8 MP, f/3.4 (periscope telephoto) + 8 MP, f/2.2 (ultrawide) + 2 MP, f/2.4 (macro)	16 MP, f/2.5	4160 mAh (Li-Po)	Android 10 (MIUI 11)	Android 12 (MIUI 13)
Mi 10 Lite	monet	May 2020	AMOLED Corning Gorilla Glass 5	6.57"	1080 x 2400 (~401 ppi)	Yes	Yes	Qualcomm Snapdragon 765G 1x 2.4 GHz Cortex-A76 + 1x 2.2 GHz Cortex-A76 + 6x 1.8 GHz Cortex-A55	Adreno 620 @750 MHz	6 GB; 8 GB (LPDDR4X)	64 GB; 128 GB; 256 GB	48 MP, f/1.8 + 8 MP, f/2.2 (ultrawide) + 2 MP, f/2.4 (macro) + 2 MP, f/2.4 (depth)	16 MP, f/2.5	4160 mAh (Li-Po)	Android 10 (MIUI 11)	Android 12 (MIUI 13)
Mi 10 Ultra	cas	August 2020	OLED, 120 Hz Corning Gorilla Glass 5	6.67"	1080 x 2340 (~386 ppi)	Yes	Yes	Qualcomm Snapdragon 865 1x 3.1 GHz + 3x 2.42 GHz + 4x 1.80 GHz	Adreno 650 @587 MHz	8 GB; 12 GB; 16 GB	128 GB; 256 GB; 512 GB (UFS 3.1)	48 MP, f/1.9 + 48 MP, f/4.1 (periscope telephoto) + 12 MP, f/2.0 (telephoto) + 20 MP, f/2.2 (ultrawide)	20 MP, f/2.3	4500 mAh (Li-Po)	Android 10 (MIUI 12)	Android 13 (Xiaomi HyperOS)
Mi 10i China: Redmi Note 9 Pro 5G	gauguinpro	January 2021	IPS LCD, 120 Hz Corning Gorilla Glass 5	6.67"	1080 x 2400 (~395 ppi)	Yes	Yes	Qualcomm Snapdragon 750G 2x 2.2 GHz Cortex-A77 + 6x 1.8 GHz Cortex-A55	Adreno 619 @950 MHz	6 GB; 8 GB (LPDDR4X)	128 GB (UFS 2.2)	108 MP, f/1.8 + 8 MP, f/2.2 (ultrawide) + 2 MP, f/2.4 (macro) + 2 MP, f/2.4 (depth)	16 MP, f/2.5	4820 mAh (Li-Po)	Android 10 (MIUI 12)	Android 12 (MIUI 14)
Mi 10S	thyme	March 2021	AMOLED, 90 Hz Corning Gorilla Glass 5	6.67"	1080 x 2340 (~386 ppi)	Yes	Yes	Qualcomm Snapdragon 870 1x 3.2 GHz + 3x 2.42 GHz + 4x 1.8 GHz	Adreno 650 @670 MHz	8 GB; 12 GB	128 GB; 256 GB (UFS 3.0)	108 MP, f/1.7 + 13 MP, f/2.4 (ultrawide) + 2 MP, f/2.4 (macro) + 2 MP, f/2.4 (depth)	20 MP	4780 mAh (Li-Po)	Android 11 (MIUI 12)	Android 13 (Xiaomi HyperOS)
Mi 11	venus	January 2021	AMOLED, 120 Hz Corning Gorilla Glass Victus	6.81"	1440 x 3200 (~515 ppi)	Yes	Yes	Qualcomm Snapdragon 888 1x 2.84 GHz Cortex-X1 + 3x 2.42 GHz Cortex-A78 + 4x 1.80 GHz Cortex-A55	Adreno 660 @840 MHz	6 GB; 8 GB; 12 GB (LPDDR5)	128 GB; 256 GB (UFS 3.1)	108 MP + 13 MP, f/2.4 (ultrawide) + 5 MP, f/2.4 (macro)	20 MP, f/2.2	4600 mAh (Li-Po)	Android 11 (MIUI 12)	Android 14 (Xiaomi HyperOS 2)
Mi 11 Lite	courbet	April 2021	AMOLED, 90 Hz Corning Gorilla Glass 5	6.55"	1080 x 2400 (~402 ppi)	Yes	No	Qualcomm Snapdragon 732G 2x 2.3 GHz Cortex-A76 + 6x 1.8 GHz Cortex-A55	Adreno 618 @825 MHz	4 GB; 6 GB; 8 GB (LPDDR4X)	64 GB; 128 GB (UFS 2.2)	64 MP, f/1.8 + 8 MP, f/2.2 (ultrawide) + 5 MP, f/2.4 (macro)	16 MP, f/2.5	4250 mAh (Li-Po)	Android 11 (MIUI 12)	Android 13 (MIUI 14)
Mi 11 Lite 5G China: Mi 11 Youth	renoir	April 2021	AMOLED, 90 Hz Corning Gorilla Glass 6	6.55"	1080 x 2400 (~402 ppi)	Yes	Yes	Qualcomm Snapdragon 780G 1x 2.4 GHz Cortex-A78 + 3x 2.2 GHz Cortex-A78 + 4x 1.9 GHz Cortex-A55	Adreno 642 @490 MHz	6 GB; 8 GB (LPDDR4X)	64 GB; 128 GB; 256 GB (UFS 2.2)	64 MP, f/1.8 + 8 MP, f/2.2 (ultrawide) + 5 MP, f/2.4 (macro)	20 MP, f/2.2	4250 mAh (Li-Po)	Android 11 (MIUI 12)	Android 13 (MIUI 14)
Mi 11X China: Redmi K40 Global: POCO F3	aliothin	April 2021	Super AMOLED, 120 Hz Corning Gorilla Glass 5	6.67"	1080 x 2400 (~395 ppi)	Yes	Yes	Qualcomm Snapdragon 870 1x 3.2 GHz + 3x 2.42 GHz + 4x 1.8 GHz	Adreno 650 @670 MHz	6 GB; 8 GB	128 GB (UFS 3.1)	48 MP, f/1.8 + 8 MP, f/2.2 (ultrawide) + 5 MP, f/2.4 (macro)	20 MP, f/2.5	4250 mAh (Li-Po)	Android 11 (MIUI 12)	Android 13 (Xiaomi HyperOS)
Mi 11 Pro	star	April 2021	AMOLED, 120 Hz Corning Gorilla Glass Victus	6.81"	1440 x 3200 (~515 ppi)	Yes	Yes	Qualcomm Snapdragon 888 1x 2.84 GHz Cortex-X1 + 3x 2.42 GHz Cortex-A78 + 4x 1.80 GHz Cortex-A55	Adreno 660 @840 MHz	8 GB; 12 GB (LPDDR5)	128 GB; 256 GB (UFS 3.1)	50 MP, f/2.0 + 8 MP (periscope telephoto) + 13 MP, f/2.4 (ultrawide)	20 MP, f/2.2	5000 mAh (Li-Po)	Android 11 (MIUI 12)	Android 14 (Xiaomi HyperOS 2)
Mi 11 Ultra	star	April 2021	AMOLED, 120 Hz Corning Gorilla Glass Victus	6.81"	1440 x 3200 (~515 ppi)	Yes	Yes	Qualcomm Snapdragon 888 1x 2.84 GHz Cortex-X1 + 3x 2.42 GHz Cortex-A78 + 4x 1.80 GHz Cortex-A55	Adreno 660 @840 MHz	8 GB; 12 GB (LPDDR5)	256 GB; 512 GB (UFS 3.1)	50 MP + 48 MP, f/4.1 (periscope telephoto) + 48 MP, f/2.2 (ultrawide)	20 MP, f/2.2	5000 mAh (Li-Po)	Android 11 (MIUI 12)	Android 14 (Xiaomi HyperOS 2)
Mi 11i China: Redmi K40 Pro+	haydnpro	May 2021	Super AMOLED, 120 Hz Corning Gorilla Glass 5	6.67"	1080 x 2400 (~395 ppi)	Yes	Yes	Qualcomm Snapdragon 888 1x 2.84 GHz Cortex-X1 + 3x 2.42 GHz Cortex-A78 + 4x 1.80 GHz Cortex-A55	Adreno 660 @840 MHz	8 GB (LPDDR5)	128 GB; 256 GB (UFS 3.1)	108 MP, f/1.8 + 8 MP, f/2.2 (ultrawide) + 5 MP, f/2.4 (telephoto macro)	20 MP, f/2.5	4520 mAh (Li-Po)	Android 11 (MIUI 12)	Android 14 (Xiaomi HyperOS)
Mi 11X Pro China: Redmi K40 Pro+	haydnin	May 2021	Super AMOLED, 120 Hz Corning Gorilla Glass 5	6.67"	1080 x 2400 (~395 ppi)	Yes	Yes	Qualcomm Snapdragon 888 1x 2.84 GHz Cortex-X1 + 3x 2.42 GHz Cortex-A78 + 4x 1.80 GHz Cortex-A55	Adreno 660 @840 MHz	8 GB (LPDDR5)	128 GB; 256 GB (UFS 3.1)	108 MP, f/1.8 + 8 MP, f/2.2 (ultrawide) + 5 MP, f/2.4 (telephoto macro)	20 MP, f/2.5	4520 mAh (Li-Po)	Android 11 (MIUI 12)	Android 14 (Xiaomi HyperOS)
Xiaomi 11 Lite 5G NE China: Mi 11 LE	lisa	October 2021	AMOLED, 90 Hz Corning Gorilla Glass 5	6.55"	1080 x 2400 (~402 ppi)	Yes	Yes	Qualcomm Snapdragon 778G 1x 2.4 GHz Cortex-A78 + 3x 2.2 GHz Cortex-A78 + 4x 1.9 GHz Cortex-A55	Adreno 642L @490 MHz	6 GB; 8 GB (LPDDR5)	128 GB; 256 GB (UFS 2.2)	64 MP + 8 MP, f/2.2 (ultrawide) + 5 MP, f/2.4 (telephoto macro)	20 MP, f/2.2	4250 mAh (Li-Po)	Android 11 (MIUI 12.5)	Android 14 (Xiaomi HyperOS 2)
Xiaomi 11iChina: Redmi Note 11 Pro	pissarro	January 2022	AMOLED, 120 Hz Corning Gorilla Glass 5	6.67"	1080 x 2400 (~395 ppi)	Yes	Yes	MediaTek Dimensity 920 2x 2.5 GHz Cortex-A78 + 6x 2.0 GHz Cortex-A55	Mali-G68 MC4 @950 MHz	6 GB; 8 GB (LPDDR4X)	128 GB; 256 GB (UFS 2.2)	108 MP, f/1.9 + 8 MP, f/2.2 (ultrawide) + 2 MP, f/2.4 (macro)	16 MP, f/2.5	5160 mAh (Li-Po)	Android 12 MIUI 13)	Android 13 (Xiaomi HyperOS)
Xiaomi 11i HyperChargeGlobal: Redmi Note 11 Pro+	pissarropro	January 2022	AMOLED, 120 Hz Corning Gorilla Glass 5	6.67"	1080 x 2400 (~395 ppi)	Yes	Yes	MediaTek Dimensity 920 2x 2.5 GHz Cortex-A78 + 6x 2.0 GHz Cortex-A55	Mali-G68 MC4 @950 MHz	6 GB; 8 GB (LPDDR4X)	128 GB; 256 GB (UFS 2.2)	108 MP, f/1.9 + 8 MP, f/2.2 (ultrawide) + 2 MP, f/2.4 (macro)	16 MP, f/2.5	4500 mAh (Li-Po)	Android 12 MIUI 13)	Android 13 (Xiaomi HyperOS)
Xiaomi 12	cupid	December 2021	AMOLED, 120 Hz Corning Gorilla Glass Victus	6.28"	1080 x 2400 (~419 ppi)	Yes	Yes	Qualcomm Snapdragon 8 Gen 1 1x 3.0 GHz Cortex-X2 + 3x 2.5 GHz Cortex-A710 + 4x 1.8 GHz Cortex-A510	Adreno 730 @818 MHz	8 GB; 12 GB (LPDDR5)	128 GB; 256 GB (UFS 3.1)	50 MP, f/1.9 + 13 MP, f/2.4 (ultrawide) + 5 MP, f/2.4 (telephoto macro)	32 MP, f/2.5	4500 mAh (Li-Po)	Android 12 (MIUI 13)	Android 15 (Xiaomi HyperOS 2)
Xiaomi 12X	psyche	December 2021	AMOLED, 120 Hz Corning Gorilla Glass Victus	6.28"	1080 x 2400 (~419 ppi)			Qualcomm Snapdragon 870 1x 3.2 GHz + 3x 2.42 GHz + 4x 1.8 GHz	Adreno 650 @670 MHz	8 GB; 12 GB (LPDDR5)	128 GB; 256 GB (UFS 3.1)	50 MP, f/1.9 + 13 MP, f/2.4 (ultrawide) + 5 MP, f/2.4 (telephoto macro)	32 MP, f/2.5	4500 mAh (Li-Po)	Android 11 (MIUI 13)	Android 13 (Xiaomi HyperOS)
Xiaomi 12 Pro	zeus	December 2021	LTPO AMOLED, 120 Hz Corning Gorilla Glass Victus	6.73"	1440 x 3200 (~521 ppi)			Qualcomm Snapdragon 8 Gen 1 1x 3.0 GHz Cortex-X2 + 3x 2.5 GHz Cortex-A710 + 4x 1.8 GHz Cortex-A510	Adreno 730 @818 MHz	8 GB; 12 GB (LPDDR5)	128 GB; 256 GB (UFS 3.1)	50 MP, f/1.9 + 50 MP, f/1.9 (telephoto) + 50 MP, f/2.2 (ultrawide)	32 MP, f/2.5	4600 mAh (Li-Po)	Android 12 (MIUI 13)	Android 15 (Xiaomi HyperOS 2)
Xiaomi 12 Pro Dimensity	daumier	July 2022	LTPO AMOLED, 120 Hz Corning Gorilla Glass Victus	6.73"	1440 x 3200 (~521 ppi)			MediaTek Dimensity 9000+ 1x 3.2 GHz Cortex-X2 + 3x 2.85 GHz Cortex-A710 + 4x 1.8 GHz Cortex-A510	Mali-G710 MC10	8 GB; 12 GB (LPDDR5)	128 GB; 256 GB (UFS 3.1)	50 MP, f/1.9 + 13 MP, f/2.4 (ultrawide) + 5 MP, f/2.4 (telephoto macro)	32 MP, f/2.5	5160 mAh (Li-Po)	Android 12 (MIUI 13)	Android 14 (Xiaomi HyperOS 2)
Xiaomi 12 Lite	taoyao	July 2022	AMOLED, 120 Hz Corning Gorilla Glass 5	6.55"	1080 x 2400 (~402 ppi)			Qualcomm Snapdragon 778G 1x 2.4 GHz Cortex-A78 + 3x 2.2 GHz Cortex-A78 + 4x 1.9 GHz Cortex-A55	Adreno 642L @490 MHz	8 GB	128 GB; 256 GB (UFS 2.2)	108 MP, f/1.9 + 8 MP, f/2.2 (ultrawide) + 2 MP, f/2.4 (macro)	32 MP, f/2.5	4300 mAh (Li-Po)	Android 12 (MIUI 13)	Android 14 (Xiaomi HyperOS)
Xiaomi 12S	mayfly	July 2022	AMOLED, 120 Hz Corning Gorilla Glass Victus	6.28"	1080 x 2400 (~419 ppi)			Qualcomm Snapdragon 8+ Gen 1 1x 3.2 GHz Cortex-X2 + 3x 2.75 GHz Cortex-A710 + 4x 2.0 GHz Cortex-A510	Adreno 730 @900 MHz	8 GB; 12 GB (LPDDR5)	128 GB; 256 GB; 512 GB (UFS 3.1)	50 MP, f/1.9 + 13 MP, f/2.4 (ultrawide) + 5 MP, f/2.4 (telephoto macro)	32 MP, f/2.5	4500 mAh (Li-Po)	Android 12 (MIUI 13)	Android 15 (Xiaomi HyperOS 2)
Xiaomi 12S Pro	unicorn	July 2022	LTPO AMOLED, 120 Hz Corning Gorilla Glass Victus	6.73"	1440 x 3200 (~522 ppi)			Qualcomm Snapdragon 8+ Gen 1 1x 3.2 GHz Cortex-X2 + 3x 2.75 GHz Cortex-A710 + 4x 2.0 GHz Cortex-A510	Adreno 730 @900 MHz	8 GB; 12 GB (LPDDR5)	128 GB; 256 GB; 512 GB (UFS 3.1)	50 MP, f/1.9 + 50 MP, f/1.9 (telephoto) + 50 MP, f/2.2 (ultrawide)	32 MP, f/2.5	4600 mAh (Li-Po)	Android 12 (MIUI 13)	Android 15 (Xiaomi HyperOS 2)
Xiaomi 12S Ultra	thor	July 2022	LTPO AMOLED, 120 Hz Corning Gorilla Glass Victus	6.73"	1440 x 3200 (~522 ppi)			Qualcomm Snapdragon 8+ Gen 1 1x 3.2 GHz Cortex-X2 + 3x 2.75 GHz Cortex-A710 + 4x 2.0 GHz Cortex-A510	Adreno 730 @900 MHz	8 GB; 12 GB (LPDDR5)	256 GB; 512 GB (UFS 3.1)	50.3 MP, f/1.9 + 48 MP, f/4.1 (periscope telephoto) + 48 MP, f/2.2 (ultrawide) + TOF 3D (depth)	32 MP, f/2.4	4860 mAh (Li-Po)	Android 12 (MIUI 13)	Android 15 (Xiaomi HyperOS 2)
Xiaomi 13	fuxi	December 2022	AMOLED, 120 Hz Corning Gorilla Glass 5	6.36"	1080 x 2400 (~414 ppi)	Yes	Yes	Qualcomm Snapdragon 8 Gen 2 1x 3.2 GHz Cortex-X3 + 3x 2.8 GHz Cortex-A715 + 2x 2.8 GHz Cortex-A710 + 2x 2.0 GHz Cortex-A510	Adreno 740	8 GB; 12 GB (LPDDR5X)	128 GB (UFS 3.1); 256 GB 512 GB (UFS 4.0)	50 MP, f/1.8 + 12 MP, f/2.2 (ultrawide) + 10 MP, f/2.0 (telephoto)	32 MP, f/2.0	4500 mAh (Li-Po)	Android 13 (MIUI 14)	Android 15 (Xiaomi HyperOS 2)
Xiaomi 13 Pro	nuwa	December 2022	LTPO AMOLED, 120 Hz Corning Gorilla Glass Victus	6.73"	1440 x 3200 (~522 ppi)	Yes	Yes	Qualcomm Snapdragon 8 Gen 2 1x 3.2 GHz Cortex-X3 + 3x 2.8 GHz Cortex-A715 + 2x 2.8 GHz Cortex-A710 + 2x 2.0 GHz Cortex-A510	Adreno 740	8 GB; 12 GB (LPDDR5X)	128 GB (UFS 3.1); 256 GB 512 GB (UFS 4.0)	50.3 MP, f/1.9 + 50 MP, f/2.0 (telephoto) + 50 MP, f/2.2 (ultrawide)	32 MP, f/2.0	4820 mAh (Li-Po)	Android 13 (MIUI 14)	Android 15 (Xiaomi HyperOS 2)
Xiaomi 13 Lite	ziyi	February 2023	AMOLED, 120 Hz Corning Gorilla Glass 5	6.55"	1080 x 2400 (~402 ppi)	Yes	Yes	Qualcomm Snapdragon 7 Gen 1 1x 2.4 GHz Cortex-A710 + 3x 2.36 GHz Cortex-A710 + 4x 1.8 GHz Cortex-A510	Adreno 644	8 GB (LPDDR5)	128 GB; 256 GB (UFS 2.2)	50 MP, f/1.8 + 8 MP, f/2.2 (ultrawide) + 2 MP, f/2.4 (macro)	32 MP (ultrawide) + 8 MP (depth)	4500 mAh (Li-Po)	Android 12 (MIUI 14)	Android 15 (Xiaomi HyperOS 2)
Xiaomi 13 Ultra	ishtar	April 2023	LTPO AMOLED, 120 Hz Corning Gorilla Glass Victus	6.73"	1440 x 3200 (~522 ppi)	Yes	Yes	Qualcomm Snapdragon 8 Gen 2 1x 3.2 GHz Cortex-X3 + 3x 2.8 GHz Cortex-A715 + 2x 2.8 GHz Cortex-A710 + 2x 2.0 GHz Cortex-A510	Adreno 740	12 GB; 16 GB (LPDDR5X)	256 GB 512 GB 1 TB (UFS 4.0)	50.3 MP, f/1.9-4.0 + 50 MP, f/3.0 (periscope telephoto) + 50 MP, f/1.8 (telephoto) + 50 MP, f/1.8 (ultrawide)	32 MP, f/2.0	5000 mAh (Li-Po)	Android 13 (MIUI 14)	Android 15 (Xiaomi HyperOS 2)
Xiaomi 14	houji	November 2023	LTPO AMOLED, 120 Hz Corning Gorilla Glass Victus	6.36"	1200 x 2670 (~460 ppi)	Yes	Yes	Qualcomm Snapdragon 8 Gen 3 1x 3.3 GHz Cortex-X4 + 3x 3.2 GHz Cortex-A720 + 2x 3.0 GHz Cortex-A720 + 2x 2.3 GHz Cortex-A520	Adreno 750	8 GB 12 GB 16 GB (LPDDR5X)	256 GB 512 GB 1 TB (UFS 4.0)	50 MP, f/1.6 + 50 MP, f/2.0 (telephoto) + 50 MP, f/2.2 (ultrawide)	32 MP, f/2.0	4610 mAh (Li-Po)	Android 14 (Xiaomi HyperOS)	Android 15 (Xiaomi HyperOS 2)
Xiaomi 14 Pro	shennong	November 2023	LTPOAMOLED, 120 Hz Xiaomi Shield (Longjing) Glass	6.73"	1440 x 3200 (~522 ppi)	Yes	Yes	Qualcomm Snapdragon 8 Gen 3 1x 3.3 GHz Cortex-X4 + 3x 3.2 GHz Cortex-A720 + 2x 3.0 GHz Cortex-A720 + 2x 2.3 GHz Cortex-A520	Adreno 750	12 GB; 16 GB (LPDDR5X)	256 GB 512 GB 1 TB (UFS 4.0)	50 MP, f/1.4-4.0 + 50 MP, f/2.0 (telephoto) + 50 MP, f/2.2 (ultrawide)	32 MP, f/2.0	4880 mAh (Li-Po)	Android 14 (Xiaomi HyperOS)	Android 15 (Xiaomi HyperOS 2)
Xiaomi 14 Ultra	aurora	February 2024	LTPOAMOLED, 120 Hz Xiaomi Shield (Longjing) Glass	6.73"	1440 x 3200 (~522 ppi)	Yes	Yes	Qualcomm Snapdragon 8 Gen 3 1x 3.3 GHz Cortex-X4 + 3x 3.2 GHz Cortex-A720 + 2x 3.0 GHz Cortex-A720 + 2x 2.3 GHz Cortex-A520	Adreno 750	12 GB; 16 GB (LPDDR5X)	256 GB 512 GB 1 TB (UFS 4.0)	50 MP, f/1.63-4.0 + 50 MP, f/2.5 (periscope telephoto) + 50 MP, f/1.8 (telephoto) + 50 MP, f/1.8 (ultrawide)	32 MP, f/2.0	5000 mAh (Global) 5300 mAh (China) (Li-Po)	Android 14 (Xiaomi HyperOS)	Android 15 (Xiaomi HyperOS 2)
Xiaomi 14 Civi China: Xiaomi Civi 4 Pro	chenfeng	June 2024	LTPO AMOLED, 120 Hz Corning Gorilla Glass Victus	6.55"	1236 x 2750 (~460 ppi)	Yes	Yes	Qualcomm Snapdragon 8s Gen 3 1x 3.0 GHz Cortex-X4 + 4x 2.8 GHz Cortex-A720 + 3x 2.0 GHz Cortex-A520	Adreno 735	8 GB; 12 GB (LPDDR5X)	256 GB 512 GB (UFS 4.0)	50 MP, f/1.6 + 50 MP, f/2.0 (telephoto) + 12 MP, f/2.2 (ultrawide)	32 MP, f/2.0 (wide) + 32 MP, f/2.4 (ultrawide)	4700 mAh (Li-Po)	Android 14 (Xiaomi HyperOS)	Android 15 (Xiaomi HyperOS 2)
Xiaomi 15	dada	October 2024	LTPOAMOLED, 120 Hz Xiaomi Shield (Longjing) Glass	6.36"	1200 x 2670 (~460 ppi)	Yes	Yes	Qualcomm Snapdragon 8 Elite 2x 4.32 GHz Oryon V2 Phenix L + 6x 3.53 GHz Oryon V2 Phenix M	Adreno 830	12 GB; 16 GB (LPDDR5X)	256 GB 512 GB 1 TB (UFS 4.0)	50 MP, f/1.6 + 50 MP, f/2.0 (telephoto) + 50 MP, f/2.2 (ultrawide)	32 MP, f/2.0	5240 mAh (Global)5400 mAh (China) (Si/C)	Android 15 (Xiaomi HyperOS 2)	
Xiaomi 15 Pro	haotian	October 2024	LTPOAMOLED, 120 Hz Xiaomi Shield Longjing Glass 2.0	6.73"	1440 x 3200 (~522 ppi)	Yes	Yes	Qualcomm Snapdragon 8 Elite 2x 4.32 GHz Oryon V2 Phenix L + 6x 3.53 GHz Oryon V2 Phenix M	Adreno 830	12 GB; 16 GB (LPDDR5X)	256 GB 512 GB 1 TB (UFS 4.0)	50 MP, f/2.0 + 50 MP, f/2.5 (periscope telephoto) + 50 MP, f/2.2 (ultrawide)	32 MP, f/2.0	6140 mAh (Si/C)	Android 15 (Xiaomi HyperOS 2)	
Xiaomi 15 Ultra	xuanyuan	February 2025	LTPOAMOLED, 120 Hz Xiaomi Shield Longjing Glass 2.0	6.73"	1440 x 3200 (~522 ppi)	Yes	Yes	Qualcomm Snapdragon 8 Elite 2x 4.32 GHz Oryon V2 Phenix L + 6x 3.53 GHz Oryon V2 Phenix M	Adreno 830	12 GB; 16 GB (LPDDR5X)	256 GB 512 GB 1 TB (UFS 4.1)	50 MP, f/1.6 + 200 MP, f/2.6 (periscope telephoto) + 50 MP, f/1.8 (telephoto) + 50 MP, f/2.2 (ultrawide)	32 MP, f/2.0	5410 mAh (Global)6000 mAh (China) (Si/C)	Android 15 (Xiaomi HyperOS 2)	
Xiaomi 17	pudding	September 2025	LTPOAMOLED, 120 Hz Xiaomi Shield (Longjing) Glass	6.3"	1220 x 2656 (~465 ppi)	Yes	Yes	Qualcomm Snapdragon 8 Elite Gen 5 2x 4.61 GHz Oryon Gen 3 Prime + 6x 3.63 GHz Oryon Gen 3 Performance	Adreno 840	12 GB; 16 GB (LPDDR5X)	256 GB 512 GB 1 TB (UFS 4.1)	50 MP, f/1.6 + 50 MP, f/2.0 (telephoto) + 50 MP, f/2.4 (ultrawide)	50 MP, f/2.2	6330 mAh(Global) 7000 mAh(China) (Si/C)	Android 16 (Xiaomi HyperOS 3)	
Xiaomi 17 Pro	pandora	September 2025	LTPOAMOLED, 120 Hz Xiaomi Shield (Longjing) Glass	6.3" 2.7"(rear display)	1220 x 2656 (~465 ppi) 904 x 572 (~396 ppi, rear display)	Yes	Yes	Qualcomm Snapdragon 8 Elite Gen 5 2x 4.61 GHz Oryon Gen 3 Prime + 6x 3.63 GHz Oryon Gen 3 Performance	Adreno 840	12 GB; 16 GB (LPDDR5X)	256 GB 512 GB 1 TB (UFS 4.1)	50 MP, f/1.6 + 50 MP, f/3.0 (periscope telephoto) + 50 MP, f/2.4 (ultrawide)	50 MP, f/2.2	6300 mAh (Si/C)	Android 16 (Xiaomi HyperOS 3)	
Xiaomi 17 Pro Max	popsicle	September 2025	LTPOAMOLED, 120 Hz Xiaomi Shield Longjing Glass 3.0	6.9" 2.9"(rear display)	1200 x 2608 (~416 ppi, RGB stripe) 976 x 596 (~394 ppi, rear display)	Yes	Yes	Qualcomm Snapdragon 8 Elite Gen 5 2x 4.61 GHz Oryon Gen 3 Prime + 6x 3.63 GHz Oryon Gen 3 Performance	Adreno 840	12 GB; 16 GB (LPDDR5X)	512 GB 1 TB (UFS 4.1)	50 MP, f/1.6 + 50 MP, f/1.2 (telephoto) + 50 MP, f/2.4 (ultrawide)	50 MP, f/2.2	7500 mAh (Si/C)	Android 16 (Xiaomi HyperOS 3)	
Xiaomi 17 Ultra/Leica Edition	nezha	December 2025	LTPOAMOLED, 120 Hz Xiaomi Shield Longjing Glass 3.0	6.9"	1200 x 2608 (~416 ppi, RGB stripe)	Yes	Yes	Qualcomm Snapdragon 8 Elite Gen 5 2x 4.61 GHz Oryon Gen 3 Prime + 6x 3.63 GHz Oryon Gen 3 Performance	Adreno 840	16 GB(Global, Leica Edition) 12 GB(China) (LPDDR5X)	512 GB 1 TB (Leica Edition, 1 TB only) (UFS 4.1)	50 MP, f/1.6 + 200 MP, f/2.39-2.96 (telephoto) + 50 MP, f/2.2 (ultrawide)	50 MP, f/2.2	6000 mAh(Global) 6800 mAh(China) (Si/C)	Android 16 (Xiaomi HyperOS 3)	
Model	Codename	Release date	Display type	Display size	Display resolution	4G LTE support	5G support	SoC	GPU	RAM	Internal Storage	Rear	Front	Battery	Initial	Latest
Model	Codename	Release date	Display type	Display size	Display resolution	4G LTE support	5G support	SoC	GPU	RAM	Internal Storage	Camera		Battery	Operating system	

===== Xiaomi T series =====
Model	Codename	Release date	Display type	Display size	Display resolution	5G support	SoC	GPU	RAM	Internal Storage	Camera		Battery	Operating system	
Model	Codename	Release date	Display type	Display size	Display resolution	5G support	SoC	GPU	RAM	Internal Storage	Rear	Front	Battery	Initial	Latest
Mi 9T China and India: Redmi K20	davinci	June 2019	Super AMOLED Corning Gorilla Glass 5	6.39"	1080 x 2340 (~403 ppi)	No	Qualcomm Snapdragon 730 2x 2.2 GHz Cortex-A76 + 6x 1.8 GHz Cortex-A55	Adreno 618 @700 MHz	6 GB; 8 GB (LPDDR4X)	64 GB; 128 GB (UFS 2.0)	48 MP, f/1.8 + 8 MP, f/2.4 (telephoto) + 13 MP, f/2.4 (ultrawide)	20 MP, f/2.2	4000 mAh (Li-Po)	Android 9 (MIUI 10)	Android 11 (MIUI 12)
Mi 9T Pro China and India: Redmi K20 Pro	raphael	August 2019	Super AMOLED Corning Gorilla Glass 5	6.39"	1080 x 2340 (~403 ppi)	No	Qualcomm Snapdragon 855 1x 2.84 GHz Cortex-A76 + 3x 2.42 GHz Cortex-A76 + 4x 1.80 GHz Cortex-A55	Adreno 640 @585 MHz	6 GB; 8 GB (LPDDR4X)	64 GB; 128 GB; 256 GB (UFS 2.1)	48 MP, f/1.8 + 8 MP, f/2.4 (telephoto) + 13 MP, f/2.4 (ultrawide)	20 MP, f/2.2	4000 mAh (Li-Po)	Android 9 (MIUI 10)	Android 11 (MIUI 12.5)
Mi 10T China: Redmi K30S Ultra	apollo	October 2020	IPS LCD, 144 Hz Corning Gorilla Glass 5	6.67"	1080 x 2400 (~395 ppi)	Yes	Qualcomm Snapdragon 865 1x 3.1 GHz + 3x 2.42 GHz + 4x 1.80 GHz	Adreno 650 @587 MHz	6 GB; 8 GB	128 GB (UFS 3.1)	64 MP, f/1.9 + 13 MP, f/2.4 (ultrawide) + 5 MP, f/2.4 (macro)	20 MP, f/2.2	5000 mAh (Li-Po)	Android 10 (MIUI 12)	Android 12 (MIUI 14)
Mi 10T Pro	apollopro	October 2020	IPS LCD, 144 Hz Corning Gorilla Glass 5	6.67"	1080 x 2400 (~395 ppi)	Yes	Qualcomm Snapdragon 865 1x 3.1 GHz + 3x 2.42 GHz + 4x 1.80 GHz	Adreno 650 @587 MHz	8 GB	128 GB; 256 GB (UFS 3.1)	108 MP, f/1.7 + 13 MP, f/2.4 (ultrawide) + 5 MP, f/2.4 (macro)	20 MP, f/2.2	5000 mAh (Li-Po)	Android 10 (MIUI 12)	Android 12 (MIUI 14)
Mi 10T Lite	gauguin	October 2020	IPS LCD, 120 Hz Corning Gorilla Glass 5	6.67"	1080 x 2400 (~395 ppi)	Yes	Qualcomm Snapdragon 750G 2x 2.2 GHz Cortex-A77 + 6x 1.8 GHz Cortex-A55	Adreno 619 @950 MHz	6 GB (LPDDR4X)	64 GB (UFS 2.1) 128 GB (UFS 2.2)	64 MP, f/1.9 + 8 MP, f/2.2 (ultrawide) + 2 MP, f/2.4 (macro) + 2 MP, f/2.4 (depth)	16 MP, f/2.5	4820 mAh (Li-Po)	Android 10 (MIUI 12)	Android 12 (MIUI 14)
Xiaomi 11T	agate	October 2021	AMOLED, 120 Hz Corning Gorilla Glass Victus	6.67"	1080 x 2400 (~395 ppi)	Yes	MediaTek Dimensity 1200 1x 3.0 GHz Cortex-A78 + 3x 2.6 GHz Cortex-A78 + 4x 2.0 GHz Cortex-A55	Mali-G77 MC9 @850 MHz	8 GB (LPDDR4X)	128 GB; 256 GB (UFS 3.1)	108 MP, f/1.8 + 8 MP, f/2.2 (ultrawide) + 5 MP, f/2.4 (telephoto macro)	16 MP, f/2.5	5000 mAh (Li-Po)	Android 11 (MIUI 12.5)	Android 14 (Xiaomi HyperOS)
Xiaomi 11T Pro	vili	October 2021	AMOLED, 120 Hz Corning Gorilla Glass Victus	6.67"	1080 x 2400 (~395 ppi)	Yes	Qualcomm Snapdragon 888 1x 2.84 GHz Cortex-X1 + 3x 2.42 GHz Cortex-A78 + 4x 1.80 GHz Cortex-A55	Adreno 660 @840 MHz	8 GB; 12 GB (LPDDR5)	128 GB; 256 GB (UFS 3.1)	108 MP, f/1.8 + 8 MP, f/2.2 (ultrawide) + 5 MP, f/2.4 (telephoto macro)	16 MP, f/2.5	5000 mAh (Li-Po)	Android 11 (MIUI 12.5)	Android 14 (Xiaomi HyperOS)
Xiaomi 12T	plato	October 2022	AMOLED, 120 Hz Corning Gorilla Glass 5	6.67"	1220 x 2712 (~446 ppi)	Yes	MediaTek Dimensity 8100 Ultra 4x 2.85 GHz Cortex-A78 + 4x 2.0 GHz Cortex-A55	Mali-G610 MC6	8 GB (LPDDR5)	128 GB; 256 GB (UFS 3.1)	108 MP, f/1.7 + 8 MP, f/2.2 (ultrawide) + 2 MP, f/2.4 (macro)	20 MP, f/2.2	5000 mAh (Li-Po)	Android 12 (MIUI 13)	Android 15 (Xiaomi HyperOS 2.2)
Xiaomi 12T Pro	diting	October 2022	AMOLED, 120 Hz Corning Gorilla Glass 5	6.67"	1220 x 2712 (~446 ppi)	Yes	Qualcomm Snapdragon 8+ Gen 1 1x 3.2 GHz Cortex-X2 + 3x 2.75 GHz Cortex-A710 + 4x 2.0 GHz Cortex-A510	Adreno 730 @900 MHz	8 GB; 12 GB (LPDDR5)	128 GB; 256 GB (UFS 3.1)	200 MP, f/1.7 + 8 MP, f/2.2 (ultrawide) + 2 MP, f/2.4 (macro)	20 MP, f/2.2	5000 mAh (Li-Po)	Android 12 (MIUI 13)	Android 15 (Xiaomi HyperOS 2.2)
Xiaomi 13T	aristotle	September 2023	AMOLED, 144 Hz Corning Gorilla Glass 5	6.67"	1220 x 2712 (~446 ppi)	Yes	MediaTek Dimensity 8200 Ultra 1x 3.1 GHz Cortex-A78 + 3x 3 GHz Cortex-A78 + 4x 2.0 GHz Cortex-A55	Mali-G610 MC6	8 GB; 12 GB (LPDDR5)	256 GB (UFS 3.1)	50 MP, f/1.9 + 50 MP, f/1.9 (telephoto) + 12 MP, f/2.2 (ultrawide)	20 MP, f/2.2	5000 mAh (Li-Po)	Android 13 (MIUI 14)	Android 15 (Xiaomi HyperOS 2.2)
Xiaomi 13T Pro	corot	September 2023	AMOLED, 144 Hz Corning Gorilla Glass 5	6.67"	1220 x 2712 (~446 ppi)	Yes	MediaTek Dimensity 9200+ 1x 3.35 GHz Cortex-X3 + 3x 3 GHz Cortex-A715 + 4x 2.0 GHz Cortex-A510	Immortalis-G715 MC11	12 GB; 16 GB (LPDDR5X)	256 GB; 512 GB 1 TB (UFS 4.0)	50 MP, f/1.9 + 50 MP, f/1.9 (telephoto) + 12 MP, f/2.2 (ultrawide)	20 MP, f/2.2	5000 mAh (Li-Po)	Android 13 (MIUI 14)	Android 15 (Xiaomi HyperOS 2.2)
Xiaomi 14T	degas	September 2024	AMOLED, 144 Hz Corning Gorilla Glass 5	6.67"	1220 x 2712 (~446 ppi)	Yes	MediaTek Dimensity 8300 Ultra 1x 3.35 GHz Cortex-A715 + 3x 3.2 GHz Cortex-A715 + 4x 2.2 GHz Cortex-A510	Mali-G615 MC6	12 GB; 16 GB (LPDDR5X)	256 GB; 512 GB 1 TB (UFS 4.0)	50 MP, f/1.7 + 50 MP, f/1.9 (telephoto) + 12 MP, f/2.2 (ultrawide)	32 MP, f/2.0	5000 mAh (Li-Po)	Android 14 (Xiaomi HyperOS)	Android 16 (Xiaomi HyperOS 3)
Xiaomi 14T Pro	rothko	September 2024	AMOLED, 144 Hz Corning Gorilla Glass 5	6.67"	1220 x 2712 (~446 ppi)	Yes	MediaTek Dimensity 9300+ 1x 3.4 GHz Cortex-X4 + 3x 2.85 GHz Cortex-X4 + 4x 2.0 GHz Cortex-A720	Immortalis-G720 MC12	12 GB; 16 GB (LPDDR5X)	256 GB; 512 GB 1 TB (UFS 4.0)	50 MP, f/1.6 + 50 MP, f/2.0 (telephoto) + 12 MP, f/2.2 (ultrawide)	32 MP, f/2.0	5000 mAh (Li-Po)	Android 14 (Xiaomi HyperOS)	Android 16 (Xiaomi HyperOS 3)
Xiaomi 15T	goya	September 2025	AMOLED, 120 Hz Corning Gorilla Glass 7i	6.83"	1220 x 2772 (~447 ppi)	Yes	MediaTek Dimensity 8400 Ultra 1x 3.25 GHz Cortex-A725 + 3x 3 GHz Cortex-A725 + 4x 2.1 GHz Cortex-A725	Mali-G720 MC7	12 GB (LPDDR5X)	256 GB; 512 GB (UFS 4.1)	50 MP, f/1.7 + 50 MP, f/1.9 (telephoto) + 12 MP, f/2.2 (ultrawide)	32 MP, f/2.2	5500 mAh	Android 15 (Xiaomi HyperOS 2.2)	Android 16 (Xiaomi HyperOS 3)
Xiaomi 15T Pro	klimt	September 2025	AMOLED, 144 Hz Corning Gorilla Glass 7i	6.83"	1220 x 2772 (~447 ppi)	Yes	MediaTek Dimensity 9400+ 1x 3.63 GHz Cortex-X925 + 3x 3.3 GHz Cortex-X4 + 4x 2.4 GHz Cortex-A720	Immortalis-G925	12 GB (LPDDR5X)	256 GB; 512 GB 1 TB (UFS 4.1)	50 MP, f/1.62 + 50 MP, f/3.0 (periscope telephoto) + 12 MP, f/2.2 (ultrawide)	32 MP, f/2.2	5500 mAh	Android 15 (Xiaomi HyperOS 2.2)	Android 16 (Xiaomi HyperOS 3)
Model	Codename	Release date	Display type	Display size	Display resolution	5G support	SoC	GPU	RAM	Internal Storage	Rear	Front	Battery	Initial	Latest
Model	Codename	Release date	Display type	Display size	Display resolution	5G support	SoC	GPU	RAM	Internal Storage	Camera		Battery	Operating system	

===== Xiaomi MIX series =====
Model	Codename	Release date	Display type	Display size	Display resolution	5G support	SoC	GPU	RAM	Internal Storage	Camera		Battery	Operating system	
Model	Codename	Release date	Display type	Display size	Display resolution	5G support	SoC	GPU	RAM	Internal Storage	Rear	Front	Battery	Initial	Latest
Mi MIX	lithium	November 2016	IPS LCD	6.4"	1080 x 2040 (~362 ppi)	No	Qualcomm Snapdragon 821 2x 2.34 GHz + 2x 1.6 GHz	Adreno 530 @653 MHz	4 GB; 6 GB (LPDDR4)	128 GB; 256 GB	16 MP, f/2.0	5 MP, f/2.2	4400 mAh (Li-Ion)	Android 6.0 (MIUI 8)	Android 8.0 (MIUI 11)
Mi MIX 2	chiron	September 2017	IPS LCD Corning Gorilla Glass 4	5.99"	1080 x 2160 (~403 ppi)	No	Qualcomm Snapdragon 835 4x 2.45 GHz + 4x 1.9 GHz	Adreno 540 @710 MHz	6 GB; 8 GB (LPDDR4X)	64 GB; 128 GB; 256 GB (eMMC 5.1)	12 MP, f/2.0	5 MP, f/2.0	3400 mAh (Li-Ion)	Android 7.1 (MIUI 8.5)	Android 9 (MIUI 12)
Mi MIX 2S	polaris	April 2018	IPS LCD Corning Gorilla Glass 4	5.99"	1080 x 2160 (~403 ppi)	No	Qualcomm Snapdragon 845 4x 2.8 GHz + 4x 1.8 GHz	Adreno 630 @710 MHz	6 GB; 8 GB (LPDDR4X)	64 GB; 128 GB; 256 GB (eMMC 5.1)	12 MP, f/1.8 + 12 MP, f/2.4 (telephoto)	5 MP, f/2.0	3400 mAh (Li-Ion)	Android 8.0 (MIUI 9.5)	Android 10 (MIUI 12.5)
Mi MIX 3	perseus	November 2018	Super AMOLED Corning Gorilla Glass 5	6.39"	1080 x 2340 (~403 ppi)	No	Qualcomm Snapdragon 845 4x 2.8 GHz + 4x 1.8 GHz	Adreno 630 @710 MHz	6 GB; 8 GB; 10 GB (LPDDR4X)	128 GB; 256 GB (UFS 2.1)	12 MP, f/1.8 + 12 MP, f/2.4 (telephoto)	12 MP + 12 MP (telephoto)	3200 mAh (Li-Po)	Android 9 (MIUI 10)	Android 10 (MIUI 12.5)
Mi MIX 3 5G	andromeda	May 2019	Super AMOLED Corning Gorilla Glass 5	6.39"	1080 x 2340 (~403 ppi)	Yes	Qualcomm Snapdragon 855 1x 2.84 GHz Cortex-A76 + 3x 2.42 GHz Cortex-A76 + 4x 1.80 GHz Cortex-A55	Adreno 640 @585 MHz	6 GB (LPDDR4X)	64 GB; 128 GB (UFS 2.1)	12 MP, f/1.8 + 12 MP, f/2.4 (telephoto)	12 MP + 12 MP (telephoto)	3800 mAh (Li-Po)	Android 9 (MIUI 10)	Android 9 (MIUI 12)
Mi MIX Fold	cetus	April 2021	Main: Foldable AMOLED Cover: AMOLED, 90 Hz	Main: 8.01" Cover: 6.52"	Main: 1860 x 2480 (~387 ppi) Cover: 840 x 2520 (~407 ppi)	Yes	Qualcomm Snapdragon 888 1x 2.84 GHz Cortex-X1 + 3x 2.42 GHz Cortex-A78 + 4x 1.80 GHz Cortex-A55	Adreno 660 @840 MHz	12 GB; 16 GB (LPDDR5)	256 GB; 512 GB (UFS 3.1)	108 MP, f/1.8 + 8 MP (telephoto macro) + 13 MP, f/2.4 (ultrawide)	20 MP	5020 mAh (Li-Po)	Android 11 (MIUI 12)	Android 13 (Xiaomi HyperOS)
Xiaomi MIX 4	odin	August 2021	AMOLED, 120 Hz Corning Gorilla Glass Victus	6.67"	1080 x 2400 (~395 ppi)	Yes	Qualcomm Snapdragon 888+ 1x 3.0 GHz Cortex-X1 + 3x 2.42 GHz Cortex-A78 + 4x 1.80 GHz Cortex-A55	Adreno 660 @840 MHz	8 GB; 12 GB (LPDDR5)	128 GB; 256 GB; 512 GB (UFS 3.1)	108 MP, f/1.9 + 8 MP, f/4.1 (periscope telephoto) + 13 MP, f/2.2 (ultrawide)	20 MP	4500 mAh (Li-Po)	Android 11 (MIUI 12.5)	Android 14 (Xiaomi HyperOS)
Xiaomi MIX Fold 2	zizhan	August 2022	Main: Foldable OLED, 120 Hz Cover: AMOLED, 120 Hz Corning Gorilla Glass Victus	Main: 8.02" Cover: 6.56"	Main: 1914 x 2160 (~360 ppi) Cover: 1080 x 2520 (~417 ppi)	Yes	Qualcomm Snapdragon 8+ Gen 1 1x 3.2 GHz Cortex-X2 + 3x 2.75 GHz Cortex-A710 + 4x 2.0 GHz Cortex-A510	Adreno 730 @900 MHz	12 GB (LPDDR5)	256 GB; 512 GB; 1 TB (UFS 3.1)	50 MP, f/1.8 + 8 MP, f/2.6 (telephoto) + 13 MP, f/2.4 (ultrawide)	20 MP, f/2.4	4500 mAh (Li-Po)	Android 12 (MIUI Fold 13)	Android 15 (Xiaomi HyperOS 2)
Xiaomi MIX Fold 3	Babylon	August 2023	Main: Foldable OLED, 120 Hz Cover: AMOLED, 120 Hz Corning Gorilla Glass Victus 2	Main: 8.03" Cover: 6.56"	Main: 1916 x 2160 (~360 ppi)Cover: 1080 x 2520 (~417 ppi)	Yes	Qualcomm Snapdragon 8 Gen 2 1x 3.2 GHz Cortex-X3 + 3x 2.8 GHz Cortex-A715 + 2x 2.8 GHz Cortex-A710 + 2x 2.0 GHz Cortex-A510	Adreno 740	12 GB 16 GB (LPDDR5)	256 GB; 512 GB; 1 TB (UFS 4.0)	50 MP, f/1.8 + 10 MP, f/2.0 (telephoto) + 10 MP, f/2.9 (telephoto)+ 12 MP, f/2.2 (ultrawide)	20 MP, f/2.3	4800 mAh (Li-Po)	Android 13 (MIUI Fold 14)	Android 15 (Xiaomi HyperOS 2)
Xiaomi MIX Fold 4															

===== Xiaomi Civi series =====
Model	Codename	Release date	Display type	Display size	Display resolution	5G support	SoC	GPU	RAM	Internal Storage	Camera		Battery	Operating system	
Model	Codename	Release date	Display type	Display size	Display resolution	5G support	SoC	GPU	RAM	Internal Storage	Rear	Front	Battery	Initial	Latest
Xiaomi Civi Global : Xiaomi 11 Lite 5G NE	Mona/Lisa	September 2021: Xiaomi Civi September/October 2021: Xiaomi 11 Lite NE 5G	OLED, 120 Hz 90 Hz- XIaomi Mi 11 Lite NE 5G Corning Gorilla Glass 5 (Both)	6.55" (Same on Both)	1080 x 2400 (~402 ppi)	Yes	Qualcomm Snapdragon 778G 1x 2.4 GHz Cortex-A78 + 3x 2.2 GHz Cortex-A78 + 4x 1.9 GHz Cortex-A55	Adreno 642L @490 MHz	Xiaomi Civi : 8 GB; 12 GB (LPDDR5) Xiaomi 11 Lite NE 5G 6 GB/8 GB (LPDDR4X )	Civi 1 : 128 GB; 256 GB (UFS 2.2) Xiaomi 11 Lite Ne 5G: 128GB 256GB (UFS 2.2)	Civi 1 : 64 MP, f/1.8 + 8 MP, f/2.2 (ultrawide) + 2 MP, f/2.4 (macro) Xiaomi 11 Lite NE 5G: 64 MP ,f/1.79 + 8 MP , f/2.2 (ultrawide) + 5 MP , f/2.4 (macro)	Civi 1: 32 MP Xiaomi 11 Lite NE 5G: 20 MP	Civi 1: 4500 mAh (Li-Po) Xiaomi 11 Lite NE 5G: 4250 mAh (Li-Po)	Civi 1/Xiaomi 11 Lite NE 5G Android 11 (MIUI 12.5)	Civi 1: Android 13 (Xiaomi HyperOS1 ) or MIUI 14 ) Xiaomi 11 Lite NE 5G Android 14 (Xiaomi HyperOS 2) (For less issues and better experiences leave on (Xiaomi HyperOS 1)
Xiaomi Civi 1S	zijin	April 2022	OLED, 120 Hz 90 Hz- XIaomi Mi 11 Lite NE 5G Corning Gorilla Glass 5 (Both)	6.55" (Same on Both)	1080 x 2400 (~402 ppi)	Yes	Qualcomm Snapdragon 778G+ 1x 2.5 GHz Cortex-A78 + 3x 2.2 GHz Cortex-A78 + 4x 1.9 GHz Cortex-A55	Adreno 642L @490 MHz	Xiaomi Civi : 8 GB; 12 GB (LPDDR5) Xiaomi 11 Lite NE 5G 6 GB/8 GB (LPDDR4X )	Civi 1 : 128 GB; 256 GB (UFS 2.2) Xiaomi 11 Lite Ne 5G: 128GB 256GB (UFS 2.2)	Civi 1 : 64 MP, f/1.8 + 8 MP, f/2.2 (ultrawide) + 2 MP, f/2.4 (macro) Xiaomi 11 Lite NE 5G: 64 MP ,f/1.79 + 8 MP , f/2.2 (ultrawide) + 5 MP , f/2.4 (macro)	Civi 1: 32 MP Xiaomi 11 Lite NE 5G: 20 MP	Civi 1: 4500 mAh (Li-Po) Xiaomi 11 Lite NE 5G: 4250 mAh (Li-Po)	Android 12 (MIUI 13)	Android 14 (Xiaomi HyperOS)
Xiaomi Civi 2	ziyi	September 2022	AMOLED, 120 Hz Corning Gorilla Glass 5	6.55"	1080 x 2400 (~402 ppi)	Yes	Qualcomm Snapdragon 7 Gen 1 1x 2.4 GHz Cortex-A710 + 3x 2.36 GHz Cortex-A710 + 4x 1.8 GHz Cortex-A510	Adreno 644	8 GB; 12 GB (LPDDR5)	128 GB; 256 GB (UFS 2.2)	50 MP, f/1.8 + 20 MP, f/2.2 (ultrawide) + 2 MP, f/2.4 (macro)	32 MP, f/2.0 + 32 MP (ultrawide)	4500 mAh (Li-Po)	Android 12 (MIUI 13)	Android 15 (Xiaomi HyperOS 2)
Xiaomi Civi 3	yuechu	May 2023	AMOLED, 120 Hz Corning Gorilla Glass 5	6.55"	1080 x 2400 (~402 ppi)	Yes	MediaTek Dimensity 8200 Ultra 1x 3.1 GHz Cortex-A78 + 3x 3.0 GHz Cortex-A78 + 4x 2.0 GHz Cortex-A55	Mali-G610 MC6	12 GB; 16 GB (LPDDR5)	256 GB 512 GB 1 TB (UFS 3.1)	50 MP, f/1.8 + 8 MP, f/2.2 (ultrawide) + 2 MP, f/2.4 (macro)	32 MP, f/2.0 + 32 MP, f/2.4 (ultrawide)	4500 mAh (Li-Po)	Android 13 (MIUI 14)	Android 15 (Xiaomi HyperOS 2)
Xiaomi Civi 4 Pro India: Xiaomi 14 Civi	chenfeng	March 2024	AMOLED, 120 Hz Corning Gorilla Glass Victus 2	6.55"	1236 x 2750 (~460 ppi)	Yes	Qualcomm Snapdragon 8s Gen 3 1x 3.0 GHz Cortex-X4 + 4x 2.8 GHz Cortex-A720 + 3x 2.0 GHz Cortex-A520	Adreno 735	12 GB; 16 GB (LPDDR5X)	256 GB 512 GB (UFS 4.0)	50 MP, f/1.6 + 50 MP, f/2.0 (telephoto) + 12 MP, f/2.2 (ultrawide)	32 MP, f/2.0 + 32 MP, f/2.4 (ultrawide)	4700 mAh (Li-Po)	Android 14 (Xiaomi HyperOS)	Android 15 (Xiaomi HyperOS 2)
Civi 5 Pro	luming	May 2025	AMOLED, 120 Hz _{Corning} _{Gorilla Glass} _{Victus 2}	6.55"	1236 x 2750 _{(~460 ppi)}	Yes	Qualcomm Snapdragon8s Gen 4 1x 3.21 GHz Cortex-X4 + 3x 3.0 GHzCortex-A720 + 2x 2.8 GHz Cortex-A720 + 2x 2.0 GHz Cortex-A720	Adreno 825	12 GB 16 GB _{(LPDDR5X)}	256 GB 512 GB _{(UFS 4.0)}	50MP, f/1.6 + 50 MP, f/2.0 _{(telephoto) +} 12 MP, f/2.2 _{(ultrawide)}	50MP, f/2.0	6000 mAh _{(Li-ion)}	Android 15 (Xiaomi HyperOS 2)	Android 15 (Xiaomi HyperOS 2)

==== Discontinued ====
===== Mi Note series =====
In January 2015 in Beijing, China, Xiaomi unveiled the Mi Note and Mi Note Pro. Both devices have a 5.7-inch display and use a dual-glass design with a 2.5D front and 3D rear glass.

The Mi Note is powered by hardware more than a year old at launch, the Mi Note Pro has the newer octa-core Qualcomm Snapdragon 810 processor, Adreno 430 GPU, 4 GB LPDDR4 RAM and LTE Cat 9, giving it a higher performance than the Mi Note, with approximately the same battery life.

Model	Codename	Release date	Display type	Display size	Display resolution	5G support	SoC	GPU	RAM	Internal Storage	Camera		Battery	Operating system	
Model	Codename	Release date	Display type	Display size	Display resolution	5G support	SoC	GPU	RAM	Internal Storage	Rear	Front	Battery	Initial	Latest
Mi Note	virgo	January 2015	IPS LCD Corning Gorilla Glass 3	5.7"	1080 x 1920 (~386 ppi)	No	Qualcomm Snapdragon 801 4x 2.45 GHz	Adreno 330 @578 MHz	3 GB (LPDDR3)	16 GB; 64 GB (eMMC 5.0)	13 MP, f/2.0	4 MP, f/2.0	3000 mAh (Li-Ion)	Android 4.4.4 (MIUI 6)	Android 6.0 (MIUI 9)
Mi Note Pro	leo	May 2015	IPS LCD Corning Gorilla Glass 3	5.7"	1440 x 2560 (~515 ppi)	No	Qualcomm Snapdragon 810 4x 2.0 GHz Cortex-A57 + 4x 1.5 GHz Cortex-A53	Adreno 430 @650 MHz	4 GB (LPDDR4)	64 GB (eMMC 5.0)	13 MP, f/2.0	4 MP, f/2.0	3000 mAh (Li-Ion)	Android 5.0 (MIUI 6)	Android 7.0 (MIUI 9)
Mi Note 2	scorpio	October 2016	AMOLED	5.7"	1080 x 1920 (~386 ppi)	No	Qualcomm Snapdragon 821 2x 2.34 GHz + 2x 1.6 GHz	Adreno 530 @653 MHz	4 GB; 6 GB (LPDDR4)	64 GB; 128 GB	22.5 MP, f/2.0	8 MP, f/2.0	4070 mAh (Li-Ion)	Android 6.0 (MIUI 8)	Android 8.0 (MIUI 11)
Mi Note 3	jason	September 2017	IPS LCD Corning Gorilla Glass 4	5.5"	1080 x 1920 (~401 ppi)	No	Qualcomm Snapdragon 660 4x 2.2 GHz Cortex-A73; 4x 1.84 GHz Cortex-A53	Adreno 512 @650 MHz	6 GB (LPDDR4)	64 GB; 128 GB	12 MP, f/1.8 + 12 MP, f/2.6 (telephoto)	16 MP, f/2.5	3500 mAh (Li-Ion)	Android 7.1 (MIUI 8.5)	Android 9 (MIUI 12)
Mi Note 10 China: Mi CC9 Pro	tucana	November 2019	AMOLED Corning Gorilla Glass 5	6.47"	1080 x 2340 (~398 ppi)	No	Qualcomm Snapdragon 730G 2x 2.2 GHz Cortex-A76; 6x 1.8 GHz Cortex-A55	Adreno 618 @825 MHz	6 GB (LPDDR4X)	128 GB; 256 GB (UFS 2.0)	108 MP + 12 MP, f/2.0 (telephoto) + 8 MP, f/2.0, (telephoto) + 20 MP, f/2.2 (ultrawide) + 2 MP, f/2.4 (macro)	32 MP, f/2.0	5260 mAh (Li-Po)	Android 9 (MIUI 11)	Android 11 (MIUI 13)
Mi Note 10 Pro China: Mi CC9 Pro Premium	tucana	November 2019	AMOLED Corning Gorilla Glass 5	6.47"	1080 x 2340 (~398 ppi)	No	Qualcomm Snapdragon 730G 2x 2.2 GHz Cortex-A76; 6x 1.8 GHz Cortex-A55	Adreno 618 @825 MHz	8 GB (LPDDR4X)	256 GB (UFS 2.0)	108 MP + 12 MP, f/2.0 (telephoto) + 8 MP, f/2.0, (telephoto) + 20 MP, f/2.2 (ultrawide) + 2 MP, f/2.4 (macro)	32 MP, f/2.0	5260 mAh (Li-Po)	Android 9 (MIUI 11)	Android 11 (MIUI 13)
Mi Note 10 Lite	toco	May 2020	AMOLED Corning Gorilla Glass 5	6.47"	1080 x 2340 (~398 ppi)	No	Qualcomm Snapdragon 730G 2x 2.2 GHz Cortex-A76; 6x 1.8 GHz Cortex-A55	Adreno 618 @825 MHz	6 GB; 8 GB (LPDDR4X)	64 GB; 128 GB (UFS 2.0)	64 MP, f/1.9 + 8 MP, f/2.2 (ultrawide) + 2 MP, f/2.4 (macro) + 5 MP, f/2.4 (depth)	16 MP, f/2.5	5260 mAh (Li-Po)	Android 10 (MIUI 11)	Android 12 (MIUI 13)

===== Mi Play series =====
Model	Codename	Release date	Display type	Display size	Display resolution	SoC	GPU	RAM	Internal Storage	Camera		Battery	Operating system	
Model	Codename	Release date	Display type	Display size	Display resolution	SoC	GPU	RAM	Internal Storage	Rear	Front	Battery	Initial	Latest
Mi Play	lotus	December 2018	IPS LCD	5.84"	1080 x 2280 (~432 ppi)	MediaTek Helio P35 4x 2.3 GHz Cortex-A53 + 4x 1.8 GHz Cortex-A53	PowerVR GE8320 @680 MHz	4 GB (LPDDR4X)	64 GB (eMMC 5.1)	12 MP, f/2.2 + 2 MP (depth)	8 MP	3000 mAh (Li-Ion)	Android 8.1 (MIUI 10)	Android 8.1 (MIUI 11)

===== Mi Max series =====
Model	Codename	Release date	Display type	Display size	Display resolution	5G support	SoC	GPU	RAM	Internal Storage	Camera		Battery	Operating system	
Model	Codename	Release date	Display type	Display size	Display resolution	5G support	SoC	GPU	RAM	Internal Storage	Rear	Front	Battery	Initial	Latest
Mi Max	hydrogen	May 2016	IPS LCD Corning Gorilla Glass 4	6.44"	1080 x 1920 (~342 ppi)	No	Qualcomm Snapdragon 650 2x 1.8 GHz Cortex-A72 + 4x 1.4 GHz Cortex-A53	Adreno 510 @600 MHz	2 GB; 3 GB (LPDDR3)	16 GB; 32 GB	16 MP, f/2.0	5 MP, f/2.0	4850 mAh (Li-Ion)	Android 6.0 (MIUI 7)	Android 7.0 (MIUI 10)
Mi Max Prime	helium	May 2016	IPS LCD Corning Gorilla Glass 4	6.44"	1080 x 1920 (~342 ppi)	No	Qualcomm Snapdragon 652 4x 1.8 GHz Cortex-A72 + 4x 1.4 GHz Cortex-A53	Adreno 510 @600 MHz	4 GB (LPDDR3)	64 GB 128 GB	16 MP, f/2.0	5 MP, f/2.0	4850 mAh (Li-Ion)	Android 6.0 (MIUI 7)	Android 7.0 (MIUI 10)
Mi Max 2	oxygen	June 2017	IPS LCD Corning Gorilla Glass 3	6.44"	1080 x 1920 (~342 ppi)	No	Qualcomm Snapdragon 625 8x 2 GHz Cortex-A53	Adreno 506 @650 MHz	4 GB (LPDDR3)	32 GB; 64 GB; 128 GB (eMMC 5.1)	12 MP, f/2.2	5 MP, f/2.0	5300 mAh (Li-Ion)	Android 7.1.2 (MIUI 8)	Android 7.1.2 (MIUI 11)
Mi Max 3	nitrogen	July 2018	IPS LCD	6.9"	1080 x 2160 (~350 ppi)	No	Qualcomm Snapdragon 636 4x 1.8 GHz Cortex-A73 + 4x 1.6 GHz Cortex-A53	Adreno 509 @720 MHz	4 GB; 6 GB (LPDDR4)	64 GB; 128 GB (eMMC 5.1)	12 MP, f/1.9 + 5 MP, f/2.2 (depth)	8 MP, f/2.0	5500 mAh (Li-Ion)	Android 8.1 (MIUI 9)	Android 10 (MIUI 12.5)

=== POCO brand ===
Although originally marketed under Xiaomi, POCO (formerly POCOPHONE on the global market) was later split off into a separate sub-brand. Xiaomi's vice president and Xiaomi India's Managing Director Manu Kumar Jain tweeted,

What started as a sub-brand within Xiaomi, has grown into its own identity. Pocophone F1 was an incredibly popular phone. We feel the time is right to let POCO operate on its own.

=== Concept phones ===
The Xiaomi Mi MIX Alpha is an Android-based smartphone, Xiaomi described it as a concept phone, but planned on bringing it into small-scale production. It was scheduled to be released in December 2019, but was cancelled due to manufacturing complexities.

== Tablets ==
=== Pad series ===
The Xiaomi Pad (formerly known as Mi Pad) is the line of tablets from Xiaomi. The first Mi Pad was released in 2014.

Model	Codename	Release date	Display type	Display size	Display resolution	4G LTE support	5G support	SoC	GPU	RAM	Internal Storage	Camera		Battery	Operating system	
Model	Codename	Release date	Display type	Display size	Display resolution	4G LTE support	5G support	SoC	GPU	RAM	Internal Storage	Rear	Front	Battery	Initial	Latest
Mi Pad	mocha	May 2014	IPS LCD Corning Gorilla Glass 3	7.9"	1536 x 2048 (~326 ppi)	N/A	N/A	Nvidia Tegra K1 Cortex-A15 4x 2.2 GHz	Kepler GK20A	2 GB	16 GB; 64 GB	8 MP, f/2.0	5 MP	6700 mAh (Li-Po)	Android 4.4.4 (MIUI V5)	Android 4.4.4 (MIUI 9)
Mi Pad 2	latte	November 2015	IPS LCD	7.9"	1536 x 2048 (~326 ppi)	N/A	N/A	Intel Atom X5-Z8500 4x 1.44 GHz - 2.24 GHz	Intel HD Graphics @200 MHz - @600 MHz	2 GB (LPDDR3)	16 GB; 64 GB	8 MP, f/2.0	5 MP	6190 mAh (Li-Po)	Android 5.1 (MIUI 7) or Windows 10 Home 64-bit	Android 5.1 (MIUI 9) or Windows 10 Home 64-bit
Mi Pad 3	cappu	April 2017	IPS LCD	7.9"	1536 x 2048 (~326 ppi)	N/A	N/A	Mediatek MT8176 2x 2.0 GHz Cortex-A72; 4x 1.6 GHz Cortex-A53	PowerVR GX6250 @600 MHz	4 GB (LPDDR3)	64 GB	13 MP, f/2.2	5 MP, f/2.0	6600 mAh (Li-Po)	Android 7.0 (MIUI 8)	Android 7.0 (MIUI 10)
Mi Pad 4	clover	June 2018	IPS LCD	8.0"	1200 x 1920 (~283 ppi)	Yes	No	Qualcomm Snapdragon 660 4x 2.2 GHz Cortex-A73; 4x 1.84 GHz Cortex-A53	Adreno 512 @650 MHz	3 GB; 4 GB (LPDDR4)	32 GB; 64 GB (eMMC 5.1)	13 MP, f/2.0	5 MP, f/2.0	6000 mAh (Li-Po)	Android 8.1 (MIUI 9)	Android 8.1 (MIUI 10)
Mi Pad 4 Plus	clover	August 2018	IPS LCD	10.1"	1200 x 1920 (~224 ppi)	Yes	No	Qualcomm Snapdragon 660 4x 2.2 GHz Cortex-A73; 4x 1.84 GHz Cortex-A53	Adreno 512 @650 MHz	4 GB (LPDDR4)	64 GB; 128 GB (eMMC 5.1)	13 MP, f/2.0	5 MP, f/2.0	8620 mAh (Li-Po)	Android 8.1 (MIUI 9)	Android 8.1 (MIUI 10)
Xiaomi Pad 5	nabu	August 2021	IPS LCD, 120 Hz	11"	1600 x 2560 (~274 ppi)	N/A	N/A	Qualcomm Snapdragon 860 1x 2.96 GHz + 3x 2.42 GHz + 4x 1.80 GHz	Adreno 640 @675 MHz	6 GB (LPDDR4X)	128 GB; 256 GB (UFS 3.1)	13 MP, f/2.0	8 MP, f/2.0	8720 mAh (Li-Po)	Android 11 (MIUI 12.5 for Pad)	Android 13 (Xiaomi HyperOS)
Xiaomi Pad 5 Pro	elish	August 2021	IPS LCD, 120 Hz	11"	1600 x 2560 (~274 ppi)	N/A	N/A	Qualcomm Snapdragon 870 1x 3.2 GHz + 3x 2.42 GHz + 4x 1.80 GHz	Adreno 650 @670 MHz	6 GB; 8 GB (LPDDR5)	128 GB; 256 GB (UFS 3.1)	13 MP, f/2.0 + 5 MP, f/2.4 (depth)	8 MP, f/2.0	8600 mAh (Li-Po)	Android 11 (MIUI 12.5 for Pad)	Android 13 (Xiaomi HyperOS)
Xiaomi Pad 5 Pro (5G)	enuma	August 2021	IPS LCD, 120 Hz	11"	1600 x 2560 (~274 ppi)	Yes	Yes	Qualcomm Snapdragon 870 1x 3.2 GHz + 3x 2.42 GHz + 4x 1.80 GHz	Adreno 650 @670 MHz	6 GB; 8 GB (LPDDR5)	128 GB; 256 GB (UFS 3.1)	50 MP + 5 MP, f/2.4 (depth)	8 MP, f/2.0	8600 mAh (Li-Po)	Android 11 (MIUI 12.5 for Pad)	Android 13 (Xiaomi HyperOS)
Xiaomi Pad 5 Pro 12.4	dagu	August 2022	IPS LCD, 120 Hz Corning Gorilla Glass 3	12.4"	1600 x 2560 (~243 ppi)	N/A	N/A	Qualcomm Snapdragon 870 1x 3.2 GHz + 3x 2.42 GHz + 4x 1.80 GHz	Adreno 650 @670 MHz	6 GB; 8 GB; 12 GB (LPDDR5)	128 GB; 256 GB; 512 GB (UFS 3.1)	50 MP, f/1.8 + 2 MP, f/2.4 (depth)	20 MP, f/2.2	10000 mAh (Li-Po)	Android 12 (MIUI Pad 13.1)	Android 14 (Xiaomi HyperOS 2)
Xiaomi Pad 6	pipa	April 2023	IPS LCD, 144 Hz Corning Gorilla Glass 3	11"	1800 x 2880 (~309 ppi)	N/A	N/A	Qualcomm Snapdragon 870 1x 3.2 GHz + 3x 2.42 GHz + 4x 1.80 GHz	Adreno 650 @670 MHz	6 GB; 8 GB	128 GB; 256 GB (UFS 3.1)	13 MP, f/2.2	8 MP, f/2.0	8840 mAh (Li-Po)	Android 13 (MIUI Pad 14)	Android 14 (Xiaomi HyperOS 2)
Xiaomi Pad 6 Pro	liquin	April 2023	IPS LCD, 144 Hz Corning Gorilla Glass 3	11"	1800 x 2880 (~309 ppi)	N/A	N/A	Qualcomm Snapdragon 8+ Gen 1 1x 3.2 GHz Cortex-X2 + 3x 2.75 GHz Cortex-A710 + 4x 2.0 GHz Cortex-A510	Adreno 730 @900 MHz	8 GB; 12 GB (LPDDR5)	128 GB; 256 GB; 512 GB (UFS 3.1)	50 MP, f/1.8 + 2 MP, f/2.4 (depth)	20 MP, f/2.2	8600 mAh (Li-Po)	Android 13 (MIUI Pad 14)	Android 16 (Xiaomi HyperOS 3)
Xiaomi Pad 6 Max 14	yudi	August 2023	IPS LCD, 120 Hz	14"	1800 x 2880 (~242 ppi)	N/A	N/A	Qualcomm Snapdragon 8+ Gen 1 1x 3.2 GHz Cortex-X2 + 3x 2.75 GHz Cortex-A710 + 4x 2.0 GHz Cortex-A510	Adreno 730 @900 MHz	8 GB; 12 GB 16 GB (LPDDR5)	256 GB; 512 GB 1 TB (UFS 3.1)	50 MP, f/1.8 + 2 MP, f/2.4 (depth)	20 MP, f/2.2	10000 mAh (Li-Po)	Android 13 (MIUI Pad 14)	Android 16 (Xiaomi HyperOS 3)
Xiaomi Pad 6S Pro 12.4	sheng	February 2024	IPS LCD, 144 Hz Corning Gorilla Glass 5	12.4"	2032 x 3048 (~295 ppi)	N/A	N/A	Qualcomm Snapdragon 8 Gen 2 1x 3.2 GHz Cortex-X3 + 3x 2.8 GHz Cortex-A715 + 2x 2.8 GHz Cortex-A710 + 2x 2.0 GHz Cortex-A510	Adreno 740	8 GB; 12 GB 16 GB (LPDDR5)	256 GB; 512 GB 1 TB (UFS 4.0)	50 MP, f/1.8 + 2 MP, f/2.4 (depth)	32 MP, f/2.2	10000 mAh (Li-Po)	Android 14 (HyperOS 1)	Android 16 (Xiaomi HyperOS 3)
Xiaomi Pad 7 Poco Pad X1	uke	October 2024	IPS LCD, 144 Hz	11.2"	2136 x 3200 (~344 ppi)	N/A	N/A	Qualcomm Snapdragon 7+ Gen 3 1x 2.8 GHz Cortex-X4 + 4x 2.6 GHz Cortex-A720 + 3x 1.9 GHz Cortex-A520	Adreno 732	8 GB; 12 GB (LPDDR5X)	128 GB (UFS 3.1); 256 GB (UFS 4.0)	13 MP, f/2.2	8 MP, f/2.3	8850 mAh (Li-Po)	Android 15 (Xiaomi HyperOS 2)	Android 16 (Xiaomi HyperOS 3)
Xiaomi Pad 7 Pro	muyu	October 2024	IPS LCD, 144 Hz	11.2"	2136 x 3200 (~344 ppi)	N/A	N/A	Qualcomm Snapdragon 8s Gen 3 1x 3.0 GHz Cortex-X4 + 4x 2.8 GHz Cortex-A720 + 3x 2.0 GHz Cortex-A520	Adreno 735	8 GB; 12 GB (LPDDR5X)	128 GB (UFS 3.1); 256 GB; 512 GB (UFS 4.0)	50 MP, f/1.8 + 2 MP, f/2.4 (depth)	32 MP, f/2.2	8850 mAh (Li-Po)	Android 15 (Xiaomi HyperOS 2)	Android 16 (Xiaomi HyperOS 3)
Xiaomi Pad 7 Ultra	jinghu	May 2025	AMOLED, 120 Hz Corning Gorilla Glass 5	14"	2136 x 3200 (~275 ppi)	N/A	N/A	Xiaomi Xring O1 2x 3.7 GHz Cortex-X925 + 4x 3.4 GHz Cortex-A725 + 2x 1.9 GHz Cortex-A725 + 2x 1.8 GHz Cortex-A520	Immortalis-G925 MP16	12 GB 16 GB (LPDDR5)	256 GB; 512 GB 1 TB (UFS 4.1)	50 MP, f/1.8	32 MP, f/2.2	12000 mAh	Android 15 (Xiaomi HyperOS 2.1)	Android 16 (Xiaomi HyperOS 3)
Xiaomi Pad 7S Pro 12.5	violin	June 2025	IPS LCD, 144 Hz	12.5"	2136 x 3200 (~308 ppi)	N/A	N/A	Xiaomi Xring O1 2x 3.7 GHz Cortex-X925 + 4x 3.4 GHz Cortex-A725 + 2x 1.9 GHz Cortex-A725 + 2x 1.8 GHz Cortex-A520	Immortalis-G925 MP16	8 GB; 12 GB 16 GB (LPDDR5X)	256 GB; 512 GB 1 TB (UFS 4.1)	50 MP, f/1.8	32 MP, f/2.2	10610 mAh	Android 15 (Xiaomi HyperOS 2.2)	Android 16 (Xiaomi HyperOS 3)
Xiaomi Pad Mini China: Redmi K Pad	turner	September 2025	IPS LCD, 165 Hz	8.8"	1880 x 3008 (~403 ppi)	N/A	N/A	MediaTek Dimensity 9400+ 1x 3.73 GHz Cortex-X925 + 3x 3.3 GHz Cortex-X4 + 4x 2.4 GHz Cortex-A720	Immortalis-G925	8 GB; 12 GB (LPDDR5X)	256 GB; 512 GB (UFS 4.1)	13 MP, f/2.2	8 MP, f/2.3	7500 mAh	Android 15 (Xiaomi HyperOS 2.2)	Android 16 (Xiaomi HyperOS 3)
Xiaomi Pad 8	yupei	September 2025	IPS LCD, 144 Hz	11.2"	2136 x 3200 (~344 ppi)	N/A	N/A	Qualcomm Snapdragon8s Gen 4 1x 3.21 GHz Cortex-X4 + 3x 3.0 GHzCortex-A720 + 2x 2.8 GHz Cortex-A720 + 2x 2.0 GHz Cortex-A720	Adreno 825	8 GB; 12 GB (LPDDR5X)	128 GB (UFS 3.1); 256 GB (UFS 4.0)	13 MP, f/2.2	8 MP, f/2.3	9200 mAh	Android 16 (Xiaomi HyperOS 3)	
Xiaomi Pad 8 Pro	piano	September 2025	IPS LCD, 144 Hz	11.2"	2136 x 3200 (~344 ppi)	N/A	N/A	Qualcomm Snapdragon 8 Elite 2x 4.32 GHz Oryon V2 Phenix L + 6x Oryon V2 Phenix M	Adreno 830	8 GB; 12 GB 16 GB (LPDDR5X)	128 GB (UFS 3.1); 256 GB; 512 GB (UFS 4.0)	50 MP, f/1.8	32 MP, f/2.2	9200 mAh	Android 16 (Xiaomi HyperOS 3)	

== Mi WiFi ==
The Xiaomi Mi WiFi is a series network routers initially launched on 23 April 2014. The latest in the series is a corporate-class router with built-in storage of up to 6 TB. It is said to have a PCB dual-antenna array supporting 802.11ac Wi-Fi standard, a Broadcom 4709C dual-core 1.4 GHz processor and 512 MB of flash memory. The router can be used as a wireless hard drive for movies and photos, in tandem with Xiaomi's apps that feature remote downloads, automatic backups, remote access to files and other features.

== TVs and set-top boxes ==
=== Xiaomi TV ===
The Xiaomi TV (formerly known as Mi TV) is a line of smart TVs designed and marketed by Xiaomi. It runs Android and was initially announced in 2013. In March 2016, Xiaomi announced Mi TV 3s 43 inch and the Mi TV 3s 65 inch curved. The Mi TV 3s 43 inch has a 43-inch 1920p x 1080p from either LG or AUO. It has the 1.45 GHz quad-core MStar 6A908 Cortex-A9 processor with Mali-450 MP4 GPU, and 1 GB DDR3 RAM and 8 GB internal memory (eMMC 4.5). At 10.9 mm, it is pretty thin for a TV. The Mi TV 65 inch curved has a 4K Samsung display. It has a 1.4 GHz quad-core MStar 6A928 Cortex-A17 processor with Mali-760 MP4 GPU. For the memory, it has 2 GB DDR3 RAM and 8 GB internal memory (eMMC 50). It is 5.9 mm thick, but it has to have a sound bar for audio.

=== Xiaomi TV Box and TV Stick ===
The Xiaomi TV Box and Xiaomi TV Stick (formerly known as Mi Box and Mi TV Stick) are a smart set-top box and streaming stick for televisions. From deals struck with content providers, the set-top box offers films and TV shows with no user account nor subscription required. The box can also access content via its USB port, such as through an external hard disk. Due to content licensing restrictions, it was only available in mainland China until October 2016, Xiaomi released a Mi Box running Android TV, making it accessible worldwide. In October 2018, Xiaomi released Mi Box S, new version of Mi Box with Android TV Oreo, later updated to Pie (9.0). In India, Xiaomi launched the Mi Box S as Mi Box 4K. In July 2020, Xiaomi released the Mi TV Stick, a 1080p Android TV streaming stick with Android 9 Pie preinstalled. In December 2021, Xiaomi released the Xiaomi TV Stick 4K, a 4K UHD streaming dongle with Android TV 11, and it supports Dolby Atmos and Dolby Vision. In 2023, Xiaomi released the Xiaomi TV Box S (2nd Gen), a successor to the original Mi Box S with Android TV 11 OS running on Google TV interface, upgraded processor, Dolby Vision, HDR10+, and Dolby Atmos support.

Model	Mi Box	Mi Box S (1st generation)	Mi TV Stick (1st generation)	Xiaomi TV Stick 4K (1st generation)	Xiaomi TV Box S (2nd generation)	Xiaomi TV Box S (3rd generation)
Release date	2016	2018	2020	2021	2023	2025
Initial release operating system	Android TV 6.0	Android TV 8.1	Android TV 9.0	Android TV 11	Android TV 11	Google TV
CPU	ARM Cortex-A53			ARM Cortex-A35	ARM Cortex-A55	ARM Cortex-A55
GPU	Mali-450			Mali-G31		Mali-G310
RAM	2GB		1GB	2GB		
Resolution	4K		1080p	4K		
Storage	8GB					32GB
Dolby Vision	No			Yes		
Weight (grams)	176.5	147	28.5	42.8	142	91.2

== Laptops ==
=== Mi Notebook Air ===
In August 2016, Xiaomi launched two ultrabooks, 12.5" and 13.3".

The 2016 12.5" laptop had an Intel Core m3 (th generation) processor, 4 GB DDR4 RAM and a 128 GB SSD. The price is RMB 3,499 and officially is only sold in mainland China.

The 2016 13.3" laptop had an Intel i5/i7 processor, 8 GB DDR4 RAM and a 256 GB SSD. It weighs 1.07 kg and is 12.9mm thin. The price is RMB 4,999 and officially is only sold in mainland China.

In March 2017, the new 12.5" laptop had an Intel Core m3 (7th generation) processor and a 256 GB SSD.

In February 2018, Xiaomi released its Mi Notebook Air in Spain

=== Mi Notebook Air 4G ===
Xiaomi released the Mi Notebook Air 4G with built-in 4G LTE by a SIM card.

The 12.5" laptop is powered by an Intel Core m3 processor with 4 GB of RAM and a 128 GB SSD.

The 13.3" laptop is powered by an Intel Core i7 processor with 8 GB of RAM and a 256 GB SSD.

Both laptops support USB-C.

=== Mi Gaming Laptop ===
Specifications - 15.6" wide-color gamut ultra-thin bezels - NVIDIA Geforce GTX 1060 - 7th gen Intel Core i7 processor - 256GB SSD + 1TB HDD - Professional gaming keyboard.

=== Mi Notebook Pro ===
Specifications-15.6" wide color gamut - NVIDIA MX150 - 8th Gen Intel Core i5/i7 processor - 256GB SSD - Long Battery Life

=== Xiaomi Book Pro ===
In March 2021, Xiaomi released the new generation of Pro notebook, the Xiaomi Book Pro. It comes with two different sizes, 14" and 15.6". The 15.6" model comes with 3.5K E4 OLED display white 14" features 2.5K 120 Hz LCD. Both available in Intel's Tiger Lake Core i5/i7 processor at launch. 15.6" models featuring AMD Ryzen 5000 series were released in May but 14" Ryzen model wasn't released till November.

In July 2022, Xiaomi released the 2022 model of Xiaomi Book Pro, bringing haptic trackpad and touchscreen. It comes with two different sizes, 14" and 16". The 16" model comes with 4K OLED touchscreen white 14" features 2.8K 90 Hz OLED touchscreen. Both available in Intel's Alder Lake Core i5/i7 processor at launch. 14" model later also available with AMD Ryzen 6600H/6800H processor, but AMD model has no touchscreen or haptic trackpad.

=== Xiaomi Book Pro X ===
In June 2021, Xiaomi released the Xiaomi Book Pro X, marketed as the first Xiaomi Laptop that costs around 10000 yuan. Like the Pro it comes with two different sizes, 14" and 15.6". The 15.6" model comes with 3.5K E4 OLED display white 14" features 2.5K 120 Hz LCD. Both available in Intel's Tiger Lake Core i5/i7 processor but with more powerful NVIDIA RTX 3050/3050 Ti GPU.

=== Xiaomi Book S ===
In June 2022, Xiaomi released the Xiaomi Book S, its first Qualcomm Snapdragon-based 2-in-1 convertible tablet, and it runs on the ARM version of Windows 11.

=== Xiaomi Book Air ===
In October 2022, Xiaomi released the new generation of Xiaomi Book Air, its first x86-based 2-in-1 convertible laptop.

== Automobiles ==
=== Xiaomi series ===
- Xiaomi SU7
- Xiaomi YU7

=== SkyNomad series ===
- Xiaomi SkyNomad N70
- Xiaomi SkyNomad N90

== Mi Electric Scooter ==
The M365 Electric Scooter is an aluminium frame scooter (Approx. 1080mm * 430mm * 1140mm) that weighs about 12.5 kg. The M365 has a maximum speed of 25 km/h (max 18 km/h on Cruise control) with a 250 watt rated motor (16 Nm max torque). The battery pack is made up of thirty 18650 lithium-ion batteries from LG, allowing for a 30 km range. (30 km long-distance range on a single full charge measured under the following conditions: 75 kg load, 25 °C weather temperatures, flat road without strong winds, power saving mode, and 15 km/h constant speeds.)

== Aquariums and fish tanks ==
Model	Geometry Mini Lazy Fish Tank	Geometry C Smart Fish Tank Pro	Geometry C Smart Fish Tank Pro	Petkit Smart Fish Tank	Petkit Smart Fish Tank Pro	Mijia Smart Fish Tank	Geometry AI Smart Fish Tank		Desgeo Smart Ecological Fish Tank
Model Number		C180	C500			MYG100	Exploration Edition	Amphibious Edition	S600
Features		remote/automatic feeding			remote/automatic feeding, intelligent lighting	remote/automatic feeding, water temperature monitoring, intelligent lighting			
Mijia App Support	Yes								
OS Requirements	Android 5.0 or iOS 11.0 and above								
Wireless					Wi-Fi IEEE 802.11 b/g/n2.4 GHz				
Shape	Double bullnose			Rectangular					
Glass Material	ABS Plastic	ABS Plastic	ABS Plastic	ABS Plastic	ABS Plastic	UHA Glass			
Dimensions; Length x Width x Height (cm)	20.3 x 10.2 x 25.4 cm	38.2 x 16.6 x 22.9 cm	38.2 x 16.6 x 29.3 cm	40.2 x 17.0 x 20.5 cm	40.0 x 16.8 x 26.5 cm	44.6 x 24.6 x 29.5 cm	38.4 x 22.5 x 28.0 cm	38.4 x 30.6 x 37.0 cm	48.8 x 32.1 x 35.6 cm
Water Capacity Liters	1.5 L			10 L	15 L	20 L	15 L	30 L	30 L
Weight (kg)						7.3 kg			
Lighting	7 color LED RGB light beads					24 LED white lights beads + 16 LED RGB light beads	18 LED RGB light beads		
Filtration & Oxygenation	basic level filtration system			4 level filtration system		5 level pro. grade filtration system	7 level pro. grade filtration system + UV light sterilization		
Water quality monitoring	No						TDS sensors		
Water temperature monitoring	No					Yes			
Heating	No					Optional heater compartment	18 °C to 32 °C automatic water heating		
Feeding	None	Smart automatic feeder							
Release date									
Launch Price (China)	199 CNY	379 CNY	599 CNY	359 CNY	599 CNY	399 CNY	000 CNY	000 CNY	000 CNY

== Wearable devices ==
=== Smart bands ===
The Mi Band was announced in August 2014. It has a 30-day battery life, can act as an alarm clock and tracks the wearer's fitness and sleep. The band also has the ability to unlock your phone based on proximity. With 2.8 million Mi Band shipments in the first quarter of 2015, Xiaomi became the world's second-largest wearables maker, accounting for 24.6% of the global market share.

Xiaomi announced the Mi Band 2 in June 2016. Mi Band 2 features PPG sensor for accurate heart rate tracking. It also uses an upgraded pedometer algorithm for gathering better fitness and sleep data. The Mi Band 2's housing was rated for IP67 water resistance.

The Mi Band 3 was released 18 July 2018. It has a larger battery, larger screen and improved water resistance.

Legend:	Discontinued and unsupported	Discontinued, but still supported	Current

Model	Mi Band	Mi Band 1S	Mi Band 2	Mi Band - HRX Edition	Mi Band 3	Mi Smart Band 4	Mi Smart Band 4C China: Redmi Smart Band	Mi Smart Band 5	Mi Smart Band 6	Xiaomi Smart Band 7	Xiaomi Smart Band 7 Pro	Xiaomi Smart Band 8	Xiaomi Smart Band 8 Active Also: Redmi Smart Band 2	Xiaomi Smart Band 8 Pro	Xiaomi Smart Band 9	Xiaomi Smart Band 9 Active China: Redmi Smart Band 3	Xiaomi Smart Band 9 Pro
Satellite navigation	No										GPS, GLONASS, Galileo, BeiDou, QZSS	No		GPS, GLONASS, Galileo, BeiDou, QZSS	No		GPS, GLONASS, Galileo, BeiDou, QZSS
Water Resistant	IP67				5 ATM												
Bluetooth	Bluetooth 4.0 BLE				Bluetooth 4.2 BLE	Bluetooth 5.0 BLE				Bluetooth 5.2 BLE		Bluetooth 5.1 BLE		Bluetooth 5.3 BLE	Bluetooth 5.4 BLE	Bluetooth 5.3 BLE	Bluetooth 5.4 BLE
Optical Heart Sensor	No	PPG heart rate sensor	PPG heart rate sensor	No	PPG heart rate sensor												
Electrical heart sensor (ECG/EKG)	No																
Blood oxygen sensor	No								Yes								
Accelerometer	3-axis											6-axis	Yes				
Gyroscope	No					3-axis							No	Yes	Yes	No	Yes
Ambient light sensor	No										Yes		No	Yes		No	Yes
Altimeter	No																
Compass	No																Yes
Display	3 LED; Multi Color	3 LED; White	0.42"OLED; Monochromatic	0.42" OLED; Monochromatic	0.78"OLED; 80*128 resolution Monochromatic	0.95" AMOLED; 120*240 resolution 291 PPI; 24 bit color depth ≥ 400 nits brightness, adjustable	1.08" TFT; 128*220 resolution 236 PPI 16 bit color depth ≥ 200 nits brightness, adjustable	1.1" AMOLED; 126*294 resolution 16 bit color depth ≥ 450 nits brightness, adjustable	1.56" AMOLED; 152*486 resolution 326 PPI up to 450 nits brightness, adjustable	1.62" AMOLED; 192*490 resolution 326 PPI up to 500 nits brightness, adjustable	1.64" AMOLED; 280*456 resolution 326 PPI up to 500 nits brightness, adjustable	1.62" AMOLED; 192*490 resolution 326 PPI; 60 Hz Refresh Rate up to 600 nits brightness, adjustable	1.47" TFT; 172*320 resolution 247 PPI; 60 Hz Refresh Rate up to 450 nits brightness, adjustable	1.74" AMOLED; 336*480 resolution 336 PPI up to 600 nits brightness, adjustable	1.62" AMOLED; 192*490 resolution 326 PPI; 60 Hz Refresh Rate up to 1200 nits brightness, adjustable	1.47" TFT; 172*320 resolution 247 PPI; 60 Hz Refresh Rate up to 450 nits brightness, adjustable	1.74" AMOLED; 336*480 resolution 336 PPI up to 1200 nits brightness, adjustable
Requires	Android 4.4 or iOS 7.0 and above				Android 4.4 or iOS 9.0 and above			Android 6.0 or iOS 10.0 and above				Android 6.0 or iOS 12.0 and above			Android 8.0 or iOS 12.0 and above		
Battery	41 mA·h; LiPo Battery; Battery life: ≥ 30 days	45 mA·h; LiPo Battery; Battery life: ≥ 30 days	70 mA·h; LiPo Battery; Battery life: ≥ 20 days	70 mA·h; LiPo Battery; Battery life: ≥ 23 days	110 mA·h; LiPo Battery; Battery life: ≥ 20 days	135 mA·h; LiPo Battery; Battery life: ≥ 20 days	130 mA·h; LiPo Battery; Battery life: ≥ 14 days	125 mA·h; LiPo Battery; Battery life: ≥ 14 days	125 mA·h; LiPo Battery; Battery life: ≥ 14 days	180 mA·h; LiPo Battery; Battery life: ≥ 15 days	235 mA·h; LiPo Battery; Battery life: ≥ 12 days	190 mA·h; LiPo Battery; Battery life: ≥ 16 days	210 mA·h; LiPo Battery; Battery life: ≥ 14 days	229 mA·h; Battery life: up to 14 days	233 mA·h; Battery life: up to 21 days	300 mA·h; Battery life: up to 18 days	350 mA·h; Battery life: up to 21 days
Charge Times	2 Pin Pogo Pin	2 Pin Pogo Pin	2 Pin Pogo Pin	2 Pin Pogo Pin	2 Pin Pogo Pin	≤ 2 hours to 100% 2 Pin Pogo Pin	≤ 2 hours to 100% USB-A	< 2 hours to 100% Magnetic charging	≤ 2 hours to 100% Magnetic charging	≤ 2 hours to 100% Magnetic charging	≤ 1 hour to 100% Magnetic charging	≤ 1 hour to 100% Magnetic fast charging	< 2 hours to 100% Magnetic fast charging	≤ 80 minutes to 100% Magnetic fast charging	≤ 1 hour to 100% Magnetic charging	< 2 hours to 100% Magnetic fast charging	≤ 75 minutes to 100% Magnetic fast charging
Weight	13.0 g	14.0 g	19.0 g	19.0 g	20.0 g	22.1 g	13.0 g	11.9 g 12.1 g (NFC Model)	12.8 g 13.0 g (NFC Model)	13.5 g 13.8 g (NFC Model)	20.5 g	27.0 g	14.9 g	22.5 g	15.8 g 22.4 g (Ceramic Special Edition)	16.5 g	24.5 g
Release date	22 July 2014	7 November 2015	7 June 2016	15 September 2017 (India)	31 May 2018	14 June 2019	6 July 2020	11 June 2020	29 March 2021	31 May 2022	4 July 2022	18 April 2023	4 October 2023	14 August 2023	20 July 2024	18 November 2024	29 October 2024
Launch Price (China)	79 CNY	99 CNY	149 CNY	1,299 RS (India)	169 CNY; 199 CNY (NFC Model)	169 CNY; 229 CNY (NFC Model)		189 CNY; 229 CNY (NFC Model)	229 CNY; 279 CNY (NFC Model)	249 CNY; 289 CNY (NFC Model)	399 CNY	239 CNY; 279 CNY (NFC Model)			249 CNY; 299 CNY (NFC Model) 349 CNY (Ceramic Special Edition)		399 CNY

=== Smartwatches ===
Xiaomi released the Redmi Watch 3 Active in July 2023. It's an entry-level smartwatch aimed at transforming the fitness experience for individuals who wants to prioritize their health and well-being.

=== Mechanical Watch ===
Xiaomi released a mechanical watch called the CIGA Automatic Mechanical Watch. It has a square shape with rounded corners. The body is stainless steel and comes with a choice of black or silver. The watch comes with a metal mesh band or a leather strap. The mechanical movement is made by Seagull watch company. The watch was designed by Hong-Kong-based Michael Young and has won the German IF Design award.

== Smart home products ==
Includes robotic vacuum cleaners and other goods.

Xiaomi Home app manages Xiaomi smart home products.

== Mi Drone ==
The Mi Drone has a 1080p camera and a 4K camera. It has a range of 2 km while able to maintain a 720p video stream.

== See also ==
- History of Xiaomi
