= Xiaomi Mi CC9 Pro =

2019 Android smartphone by Xiaomi

Xiaomi Mi CC9 Pro Xiaomi Mi Note 10 & Note 10 Pro
- Manufacturer: Xiaomi
- Type: Phablet
- Series: Mi, Mi Note
- First released: November 11, 2019; 6 years ago (Mi CC9 Pro)
- Form factor: Slate
- Dimensions: H: 157.8 mm (6.21 in); W: 74.2 mm (2.92 in); D: 9.7 mm (0.38 in)
- Weight: 208 g (7.3 oz)
- Operating system: Original: Android 9.0 "Pie", MIUI 10; Current: Android 11, MIUI 13
- System-on-chip: Qualcomm Snapdragon 730G
- CPU: Octa-core (2×2.2 GHz Kryo 470 Gold & 6×1.8 GHz Kryo 470 Silver)
- GPU: Adreno 618
- Memory: 6 or 8 GB
- Storage: 128 GB or 256 GB
- Removable storage: None
- Battery: 5260 mAh
- Rear camera: 108 MP, f/1.7, 25mm, 1/1.33", 0.8 μm + 20 MP, f/2.2, 13mm, 1/2.8", 1.0 μm (Ultrawide) + 12 MP, f/2.0, 50mm, 1/2.55", 1.4 μm (Telephoto with 2x optical zoom) + 5 MP (upscaled to 8 MP), f/2.0, 1.0 μm (Telephoto with 5x optical zoom) + 2 MP, f/2.4, 1/5", 1.75μm (Dedicated macro); Laser/PDAF, OIS, Quad-LED flash 4K@30 fps, 1080p@30/60/120/240 fps, 720p@960 fps, HDR
- Front camera: 32 MP with f/2.0 lens, 0.8 μm, 1080p at 30 fps, HDR
- Display: 6.47 in (164 mm) FHD+ 1080p AMOLED at 398 ppi, 2340 × 1080 pixel resolution (19.5:9); DCI-P3, HDR10
- Sound: Loudspeaker, 3.5mm audio jack
- Connectivity: Wi-Fi 2.4 GHz + 5.0 GHz 802.11a/b/g/n/ac, Bluetooth 5.0 + LE, NFC, GPS (GLONASS, Galileo, BeiDou)
- Data inputs: USB-C; Fingerprint (in-display), accelerometer, gyro, proximity, compass, hall-effect sensor, barometer
- Codename: Tucana
- Website: https://www.mi.com/global/mi-note-10

The Xiaomi Mi CC9 Pro (known as the Mi Note 10 or Mi Note 10 Pro globally) is an Android smartphone developed by Xiaomi. It is the world's first commercially available phone with a 108 MP primary camera.

== Specifications ==
=== Design and Hardware ===
The Mi CC9 Pro uses an anodized aluminum frame with curved Gorilla Glass 5 on both the front and back. On the back, three of the lenses are housed in a protruding camera module with the fourth having a separate lens, while the lowermost is flush with the glass panel. Internally, the device uses the Snapdragon 730G processor with the Adreno 618 GPU. It is available with 128 or 256 GB of non-expandable UFS 2.1 internal storage, and 6 or 8 GB of RAM. A 6.47-inch (164mm) 1080p curved AMOLED display is used with a 19.5:9 aspect ratio, with an optical fingerprint sensor under the screen. The loudspeaker is located on the bottom of the device along with the 3.5mm audio jack. The device is powered by a 5260mAh battery which can be recharged at up to 30W over USB-C, although wireless charging is not supported.

==== Camera ====
The rear of the device features a penta-camera setup with 10x hybrid zoom consisting of a 108 MP primary lens, a 20 MP ultrawide lens, a 12 MP telephoto lens with 2x optical zoom, a 5 MP telephoto lens with 5x optical zoom and a 2 MP dedicated macro lens. Photos taken with the 5 MP telephoto lens are upscaled to 8 MP. Autofocus is present on all cameras except the macro lens, and OIS is present on the primary and 5x zoom lenses. The macro lens is capable of focusing at 2–10 cm and is used for closeup photos, but the ultrawide lens is used for macro shots in videos. If the subject is closer than 2 cm, the phone will use both cameras. The CC9 Pro can record 4K video at 30fps, 1080p video at 30, 60, 120 or 240fps or ultra slow-motion 720p video at 960fps. Four LEDs are located to the right of the camera module for the flash, two of which are placed behind a diffuser. A 32 MP f/2.0 sensor is also used for the front camera, which can record 1080p video at 30fps.

=== Software ===
The Mi CC9 Pro runs on MIUI 12.5, which is based on Android 11.

== Reception ==
Reviewing the global Mi Note 10, GSMArena gave it a 4.2/5, but had mixed feelings about the camera and chipset, noting that for the phone's price point a flagship processor would have made it more compelling. The camera was described as producing excellent daylight photos, yet lowlight photos were merely average and video recording was unimpressive. Overall, they concluded that while the device is not the best smartphone on the market, it is "certainly a great package worth recommending".

It received a camera score of 121 from DXOMARK, tying it with the Huawei Mate 30 Pro as the top-ranked phone on the site at the time, and also received a video score of 102, the highest score for videos.
