= Xiaomi MIX 4 =

Android smartphone

Xiaomi Mi MIX 4
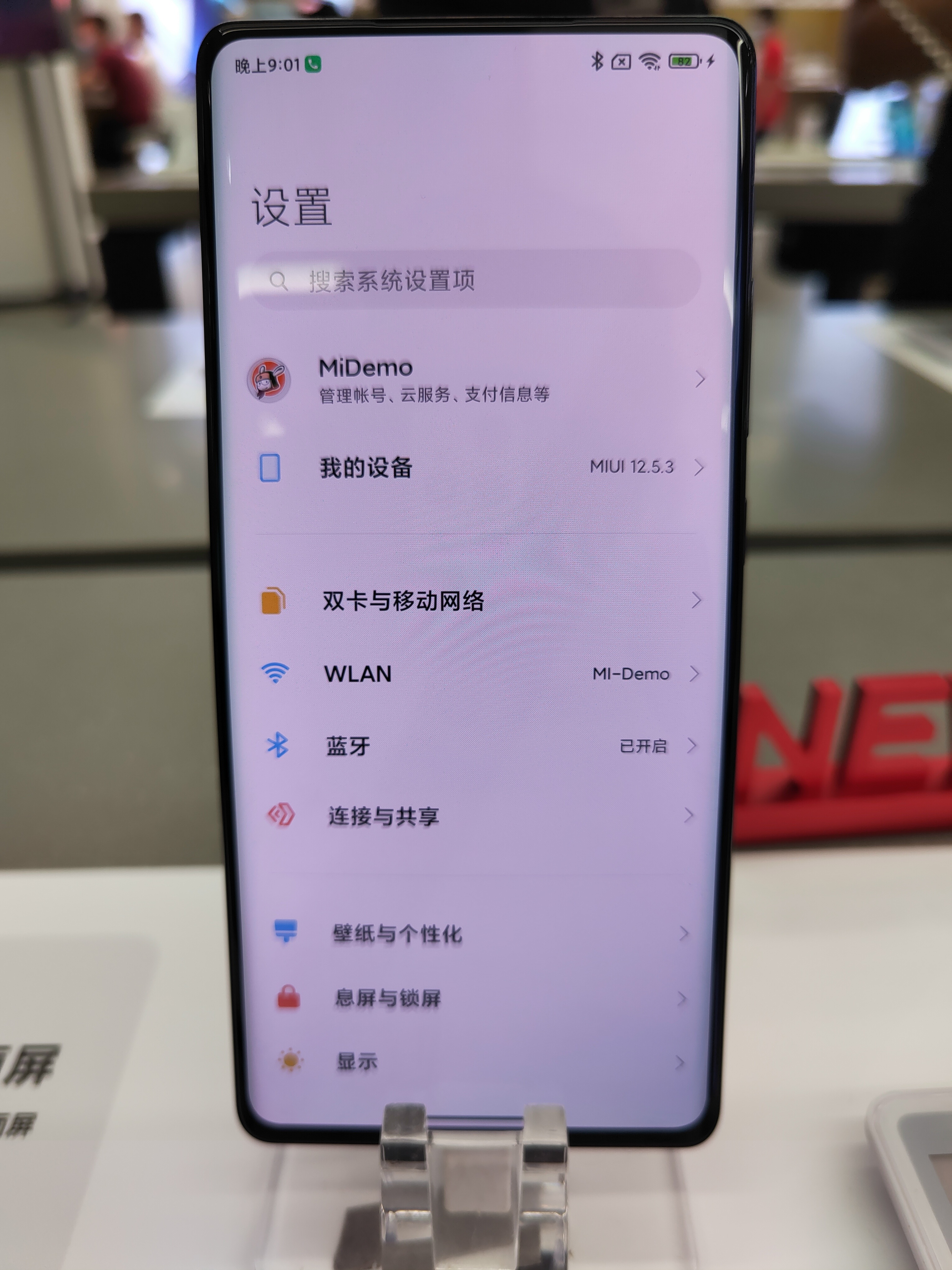
- Manufacturer: Xiaomi
- Type: Phablet
- Series: MIX
- First released: August 16, 2021; 4 years ago
- Predecessor: Xiaomi Mi MIX 3
- Related: Xiaomi Mi MIX Alpha; Xiaomi Mi MIX Fold
- Compatible networks: 2G, 3G, 4G, 4G LTE, 5G
- Form factor: Slate
- Dimensions: 162.6 mm × 75.4 mm × 8 mm (6.40 in × 2.97 in × 0.31 in)
- Weight: 225 g
- Operating system: Initial: Android 11 with MIUI 12.5; Current: Android 14 with Xiaomi HyperOS
- System-on-chip: Qualcomm Snapdragon 888+
- CPU: Octa-core, (1x 2.99 GHz Kryo 680 Prime – Cortex-X1 derivative + 3x 2.42 GHz Kryo 680 Gold – Cortex-A78 derivative + 4x 1.8 GHz Kryo 680 Silver – Cortex-A55 derivative)
- GPU: Adreno 660
- Memory: 128, 256 or 512 GB UFS 3.1
- Storage: 8 or 12 GB RAM
- Removable storage: None
- Battery: 4500 mAh
- Charging: 120 W USB-C, 50 W Wireless
- Rear camera: 108 MP, f/1.9, 24 mm, 1/1.33", 0.8 μm (wide) + 8 MP, f/4.1, 120 mm (telephoto) + 13 MP, f/2.2, 12 mm, 123°, 1/3.06", 1.12 μm (ultrawide) Dual Pixel PDAF, Laser AF, OIS, 5x optical zoom 8K@24fps, 4K@30/60fps, 1080p@30/60/120/480fps, gyro-EIS, HDR10+
- Front camera: Under-display 20 MP, 27 mm, 1/3.4", 0.8 μm, 1080p@30fps
- Display: 6.67 in (169 mm) AMOLED capacitive touchscreen, 1080p 2400 × 1080 pixels, 20:9 aspect ratio (395 ppi), 120 Hz refresh rate, HDR10+, Dolby Vision
- Sound: Stereo loudspeakers
- Connectivity: Wi-Fi 802.11a/b/g/n/ac/6e (2.4 & 5GHz), dual-band, WiFi Direct, hotspot, Ultra-wideband support Bluetooth V5.2, A2DP, Low-energy, aptX HD, dual-band A-GPS, GLONASS, GALILEO, BDS, QZSS, NavIC, USB Type-C 2.0
- Data inputs: Fingerprint scanner (optical); Accelerometer; Gyroscope; Proximity sensor; Electronic compass; Color spectrum

The Xiaomi Mi MIX 4 is an Android smartphone launched on 10 August 2021 by Xiaomi. As of 2021, it is the latest successor to the Xiaomi Mi MIX product line and follows its immediate predecessor the Xiaomi Mi MIX 3 which launched in 2018. The Mi MIX 4 is the first device from Xiaomi to offer an under-display selfie camera, following the Axon 20 5G and Axon 30 from ZTE; Oppo also previewed the technology a week before the Mi MIX 4's release.

== Design ==
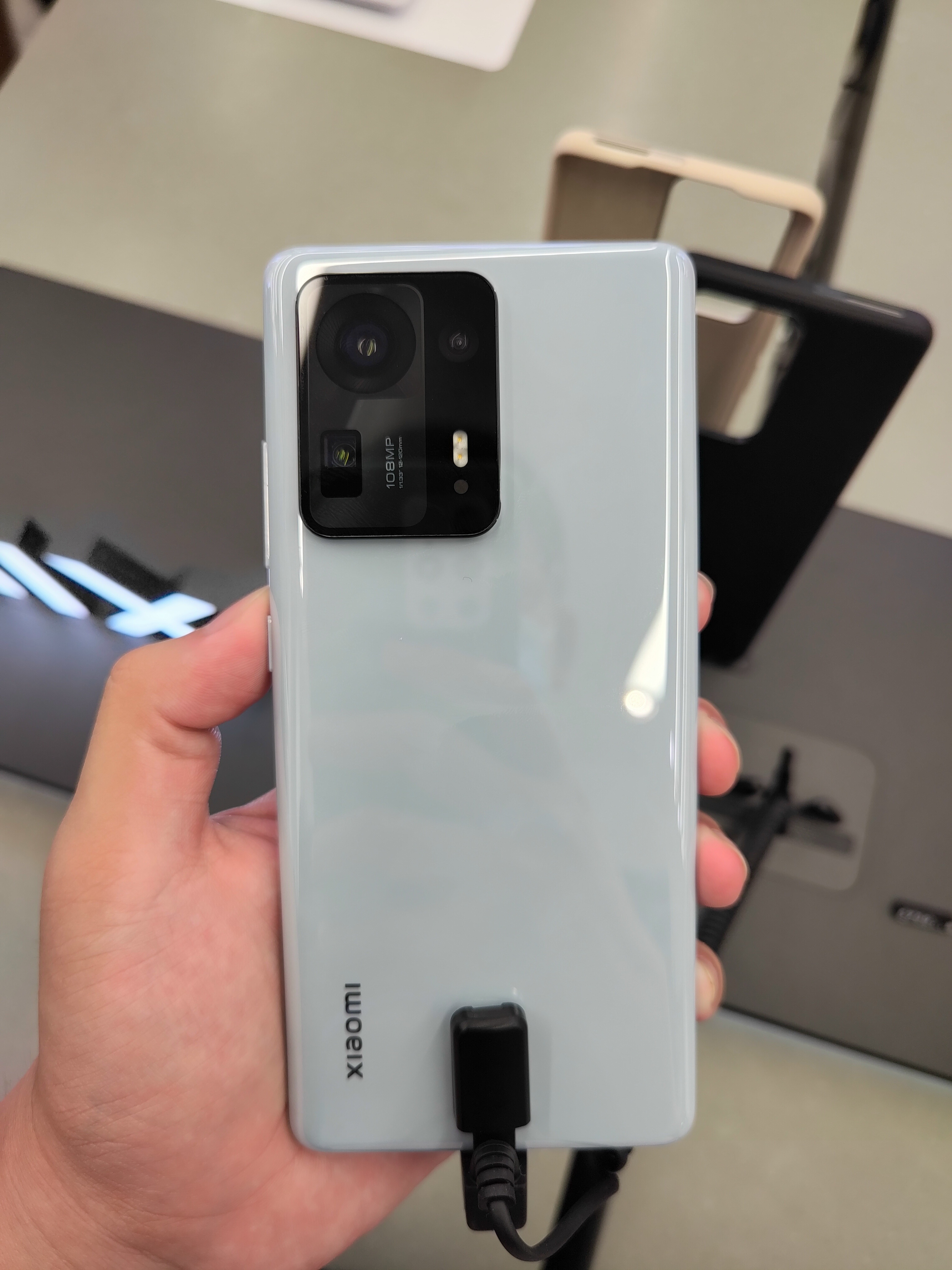
The back panel of the Xiaomi MIX 4 in Ceramic Gray

The front is made of Corning Gorilla Glass Victus and the back is made of ceramic.

The camera island design is similar to Xiaomi Mi 11 Ultra's camera island but without second display.

On the bottom, there is a USB-C port, a speaker, a microphone, and a dual SIM tray. On the top, there is an additional microphone, the IR blaster and a second speaker. On the right side, there is the volume rocker and the power button.

The Xiaomi Mi MIX 4 was available in 3 color options: Ceramic Black, Ceramic White and Ceramic Gray.

== Specifications ==
=== Hardware ===
The Xiaomi Mi MIX 4 is the first phone to be equipped with the Qualcomm Snapdragon 888+ SoC. It has an overclocked Kryo 680 Prime (Cortex-X1) performance core which runs at 2.99 GHz compared to 2.84 GHz in the Snapdragon 888. The smartphone came in 8/128 GB, 8/256 GB, 12/256 GB, and 12/512 GB memory configurations.

The Xiaomi Mi MIX 4 features a non-removable 5000 mAh lithium polymer battery with the 120W fast wired charging support, 50W fast wireless charging support, and 10W reverse wireless charging support.

=== Software ===
The Xiaomi Mi MIX 4 initially came with MIUI 12.5 custom skin, which is based on Android 11. Later, the phone was updated to Xiaomi HyperOS, which is based on Android 14.

== Xiaomi Mi MIX 4 BYD ==
The Xiaomi Mi MIX 4 BYD is a special edition of the Xiaomi Mi MIX 4, co-developed with BYD Electronic — a supplier of ceramic panels and metal frames for the Xiaomi Mi MIX 4 and other Xiaomi phones, including the Mi MIX 2S, Mi MIX 3, or Mi 11 Ultra. A total of 500 units were released, priced at $900 for the 8/256 GB memory configuration.
