= Samsung Galaxy Z Flip =

2020 foldable smartphone by Samsung Electronics

Samsung Galaxy Z Flip Samsung Galaxy Z Flip 5G

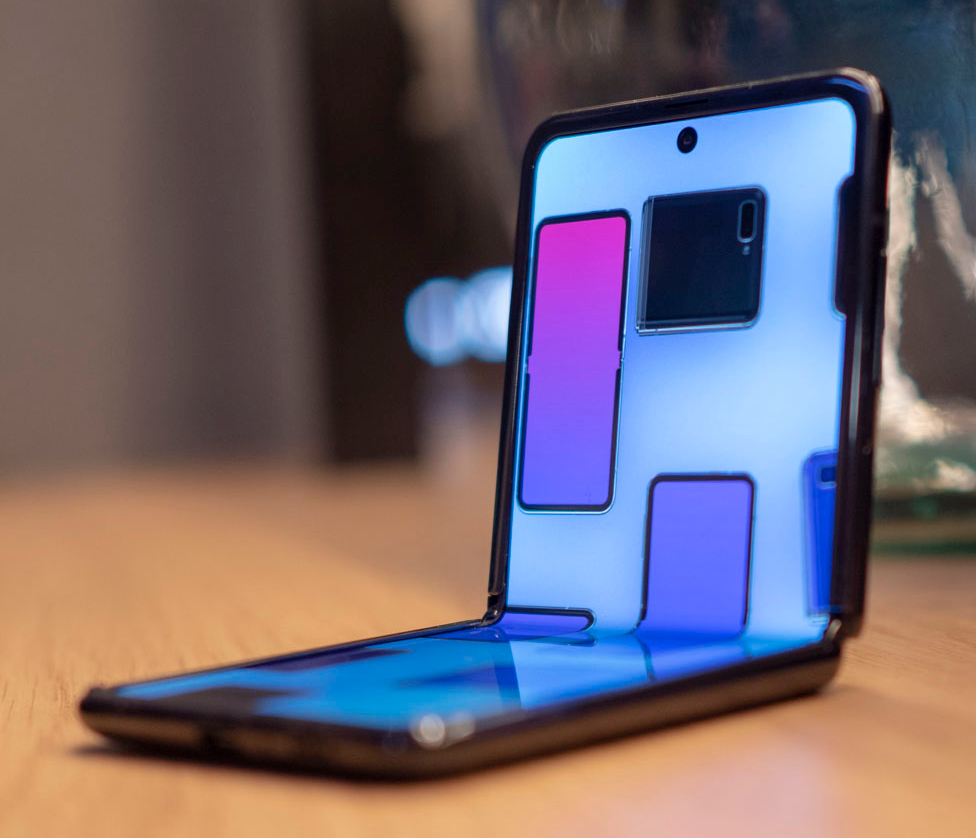
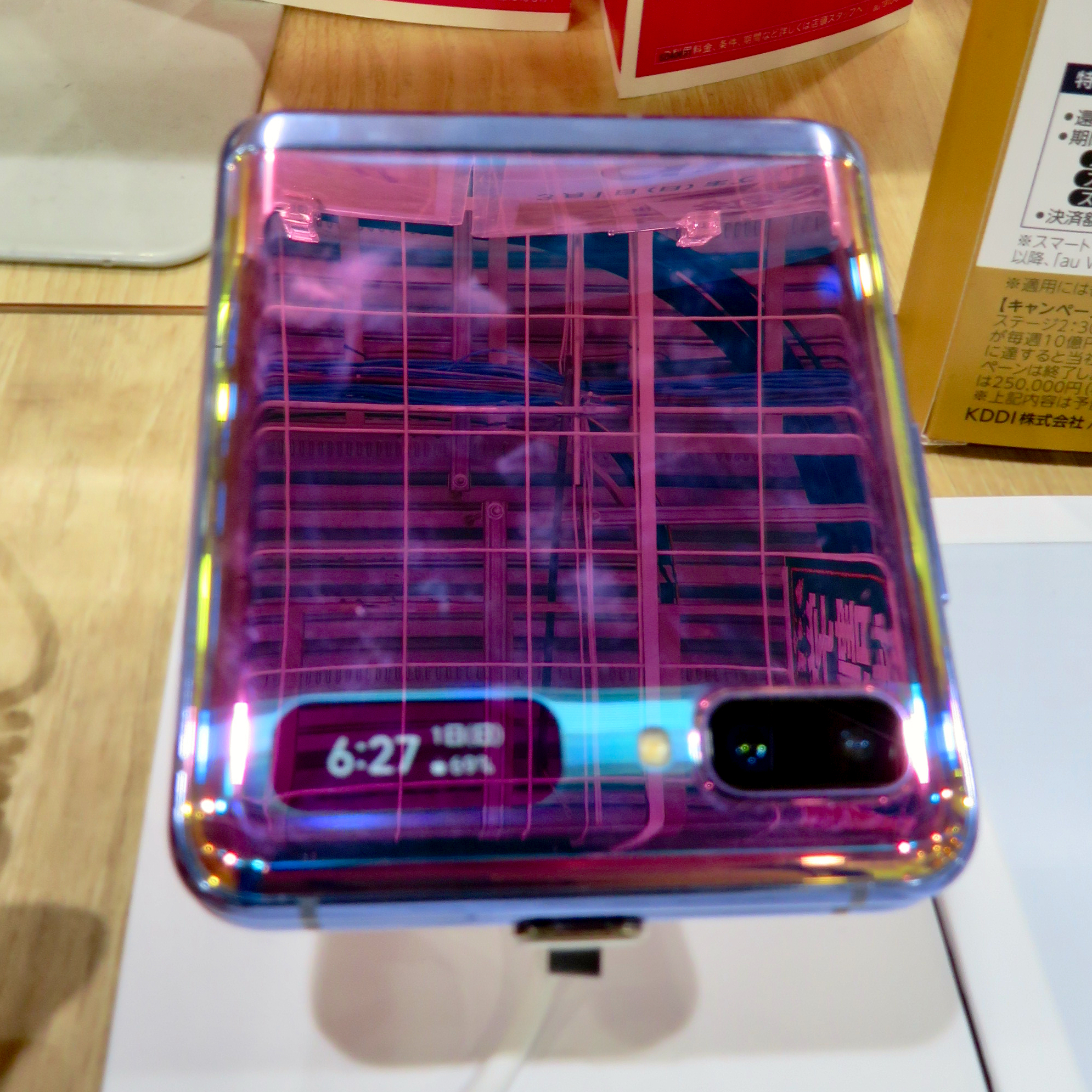
- Top: the first-generation Galaxy Z Flip unfolded to an approximate 90 degree angle Bottom: the phone folded (glossy purple version shown here)
- Also known as: Samsung Galaxy Flip (in certain European territories)
- Brand: Samsung
- Manufacturer: Samsung Electronics
- Type: Foldable smartphone
- Series: Galaxy Z Flip
- Family: Samsung Galaxy
- First released: 4G: February 11, 2020; 6 years ago 5G: June 22, 2020; 6 years ago
- Availability by region: 4G: February 14, 2020; 6 years ago 5G: August 7, 2020; 6 years ago
- Discontinued: August 11, 2021; 5 years ago
- Successor: Samsung Galaxy Z Flip 3
- Related: Samsung Galaxy Fold; Samsung Galaxy S20; Samsung Galaxy Note 20; Samsung Galaxy Z Fold 2
- Compatible networks: 2G, 3G, 4G, 4G LTE, 5G
- Form factor: Foldable slate
- Dimensions: Unfolded: 167.3 mm (6.59 in) H 73.6 mm (2.90 in) W 7.2 mm (0.28 in) D Folded: 1 mm (0.039 in) H 73.6 mm (2.90 in) W 17.3 mm (0.68 in) D
- Weight: 183 g (6.5 oz)
- Operating system: Original: Z Flip: Android 10 with One UI 2.1; Z Flip 5G: Android 10 with One UI 2.5; Current: Android 13 with One UI 5.1.1
- System-on-chip: 4G: Qualcomm Snapdragon 855+ 5G: Qualcomm Snapdragon 865+
- CPU: 4G: Octa-core (1x2.95 GHz, 3x2.41 GHz and 4x1.78 GHz) Kryo 485; 5G: Octa-core (1x3.09 GHz, 3x2.40 GHz and 4x1.80 GHz) Kryo 585
- GPU: 4G: Adreno 640; 5G: Adreno 650
- Memory: 8 GB LPDDR4X
- Storage: 256 GB; 4G: UFS 3.0; 5G: UFS 3.1
- Removable storage: non-expandable
- Battery: 3300 mAh
- Rear camera: 12 MP, f/1.8, 27mm, 1/2.55", 1.4 μm (wide) + 12 MP, f/2.2, 12mm, 1.12 μm (ultrawide), Dual Pixel PDAF, OIS, LED flash, HDR10+, panorama, 4K@30/60fps, 1080p@60/240fps, 720p@960fps
- Front camera: 10 MP, f/2.4, 26mm, 1.22 μm, PDAF, HDR, 4K@30fps
- Display: Dynamic AMOLED, HDR10+, 1080 × 2636, 6.7 in (17 cm), ~22:9 aspect ratio, 425 ppi
- External display: Super AMOLED, 112 × 300, 1.1 in (2.8 cm), 8:3 aspect ratio, 291 ppi
- Sound: Dolby Atmos stereo speakers
- Connectivity: Bluetooth 5.0; Wi-Fi b/g/n/ac/6
- Data inputs: Accelerometer; Barometer; Capacitive touchscreen; Fingerprint scanner (side-mounted); Pressure sensor; Gyroscope; Hall sensor; Proximity sensor; Magnetometer; Power button; Volume rocker
- Model: International models: SM-F700x (LTE); SM-F707x (5G) (Last letter varies by carrier and international models); Japanese models: SCV47 (au, 4G); SCG04 (au, 5G)
- Codename: Bloom
- Other: Physical sound volume keys USB-C
- Website: www.samsung.com/global/galaxy/galaxy-z-flip/

The Samsung Galaxy Z Flip is a foldable smartphone developed and designed by Samsung Electronics as part of the Galaxy Z series, released on February 14, 2020 after being announced in conjunction with the Galaxy S20 series on February 11. It uses a flexible display that folds, a technology that had appeared previously on the company's Galaxy Fold, in a clamshell design. It was the first foldable smartphone with an "ultra-thin" glass panel (the Galaxy Fold used dual-layer plastic).

As with other Galaxy devices, the Galaxy Z Flip runs Android and Samsung's One UI interface. It was the first of the 'Z Flip' line of foldables: its successor, the Samsung Galaxy Z Flip 3, was introduced in 2021.

== History and release ==
The Samsung Galaxy Z Flip's existence was first revealed in an advertisement during the 2020 Academy Awards. It was unveiled on February 11, 2020 (alongside the Galaxy S20) and was released on February 14, 2020, or February 28, 2020 in Japan. Unlike the Galaxy Z Fold, the device folds horizontally and uses a hybrid glass coating branded as "Infinity Flex Display". It was released available in three colors: Mirror Purple, Mirror Black, and Mirror Gold.

Introduced shortly after the Motorola Razr (2020)'s release, the Samsung Galaxy Z Flip was widely compared to and served as the main competitor to Motorola's Razr in the emerging foldable clamshell market.

On July 22, 2020, Samsung announced a 5G version of the Galaxy Z Flip. This variant was released in two colors: Mystic Bronze and Mystic Gray. The 5G version was also made available in a limited-edition "Mystic White" color. In Japan, the Galaxy Z Flip 5G was released on 4 November 2020.

== Specifications ==
=== Design ===
The Galaxy Z Flip is constructed with an aluminum frame, and 30 μm (0.0012 in)-thick "ultra-thin glass" with a plastic layer similar to the Galaxy Fold, manufactured by Samsung with materials from Schott AG, which is "produced using an intensifying process to enhance its flexibility and durability", and injected with a "special material up to an undisclosed depth to achieve a consistent hardness"; conventional Gorilla Glass is used for the back panels. The Z Flip is the first foldable smartphone to use a glass display, while previous foldable phones such as the Motorola Razr and the Galaxy Fold have used plastic displays. Using a glass display results in a more durable screen, and reduces the screen crease in the folding point. The hinge mechanism is strengthened with nylon fibers designed to keep dust out; Samsung rated the fold mechanism as supporting up to 200,000 uses. The device comes in 3 colors for the LTE version which are Mirror Purple, Mirror Black and Mirror Gold. It also comes in 2 colors for the 5G version which are Mystic Bronze and Mystic Gray. However, the color availability may vary depending on country or carrier. The Z Flip is also available in a Limited Edition Thom Browne model, featuring a red, white, and blue stripe on a gray base.

=== Hardware ===
The device uses a clamshell design to conceal a 6.7" 21:9 Dynamic AMOLED display which supports HDR10+. The screen has a circular cutout at the top of the display for the front-facing camera. The exterior features a small 1.1" external display adjacent to the camera module, which can display the time, date and battery status, interact with notifications, answer phone calls and act as a viewfinder. The Qualcomm Snapdragon 855+ SoC and Adreno 640 GPU are utilized, with 8 GB of LPDDR4X RAM and 256 GB of non-expandable UFS 3.0 storage. It uses two batteries which have a total capacity of 3300 mAh, and can be recharged over USB-C at up to 15W wired or wirelessly via Qi. The power button is embedded in the frame and doubles as the fingerprint sensor, with the volume rocker located above. A dual camera setup on the rear has a 12 MP primary sensor and a 12 MP ultrawide sensor. The front-facing camera has a 10 MP sensor.

=== Software ===
The Z Flip is pre-installed with Android 10 and Samsung's One UI 2 skin. Split-screen functionality, called "Flex mode" is supported with certain apps like YouTube and Google Duo.

==== Software lifecycle ====
On 18 August 2020, Samsung announced that the Z Flip alongside a selection of other Samsung Galaxy devices, would be supported for three generations of Android software updates, and 4 years of security updates.

In December 2020, Samsung announced the Z Flip to be eligible for the Android 11 upgrade with One UI 3.

Owing to the Z Flip being eligible for three generations of Android OS upgrades, Samsung highly likely announced in January 2021 that the phone would receive two more major Android upgrades after receiving Android 11.

In January 2022, Samsung released the second major OS upgrade for the device, One UI 4, based on Android 12. Android 13 with One UI 5, issued by January 2023, was the last major OS update for the Z Flip.

== Reception ==
The Z Flip was met with mixed to positive reviews at launch. It was praised for its flagship hardware, form factor, software/UI, display, and camera, but criticized for the price, size of the cover display, and perceived overall fragility. Sascha Segan of PC Magazine gave the Z Flip a 3/5, stating that "the Samsung Galaxy Z Flip is the first folding phone to really work, but it's still a costly and potentially fragile fashion object rather than a mainstream hit".

Jessica Dolcourt of CNET gave the Z Flip a 7.9/10, calling it "a cohesive device that's easy to pick up and use right away". Dolcourt called Flex Mode "the most unique, interesting and effective feature by far", while noting that battery life was just average and most multimedia was incompatible with the device's aspect ratio, resulting in pillarboxing. Chris Velazco of Engadget gave it a 78, praising the form factor, performance and cameras while criticizing the cover display and overall fragility.

Dieter Bohn of The Verge gave the Z Flip a 6/10, concluding that "as with previous folding phones it is more of an expensive experiment than a real product anybody should buy". Bohn praised the performance and hinge design, but was critical of the price and cameras, noting that the screen's plastic covering was still susceptible to scratches. Samuel Gibbs of The Guardian praised the phone's durability, reporting that "the screen looks and works just as great today as it did fresh out of the box" despite being unfolded several dozen times each day for four months.

In comparison to its main rival, Motorola Razr, critics generally felt that the Samsung was more polished and more powerful while also praising its cheaper price. Industry estimates suggested that Samsung held a dominant share of about 86% and 87% of the foldable market in 2020 and 2021 respectively, although this includes Samsung's Z Fold series as well as Z Flip.

iFixit gave the device a repairability score of 2/10.

== Gallery ==
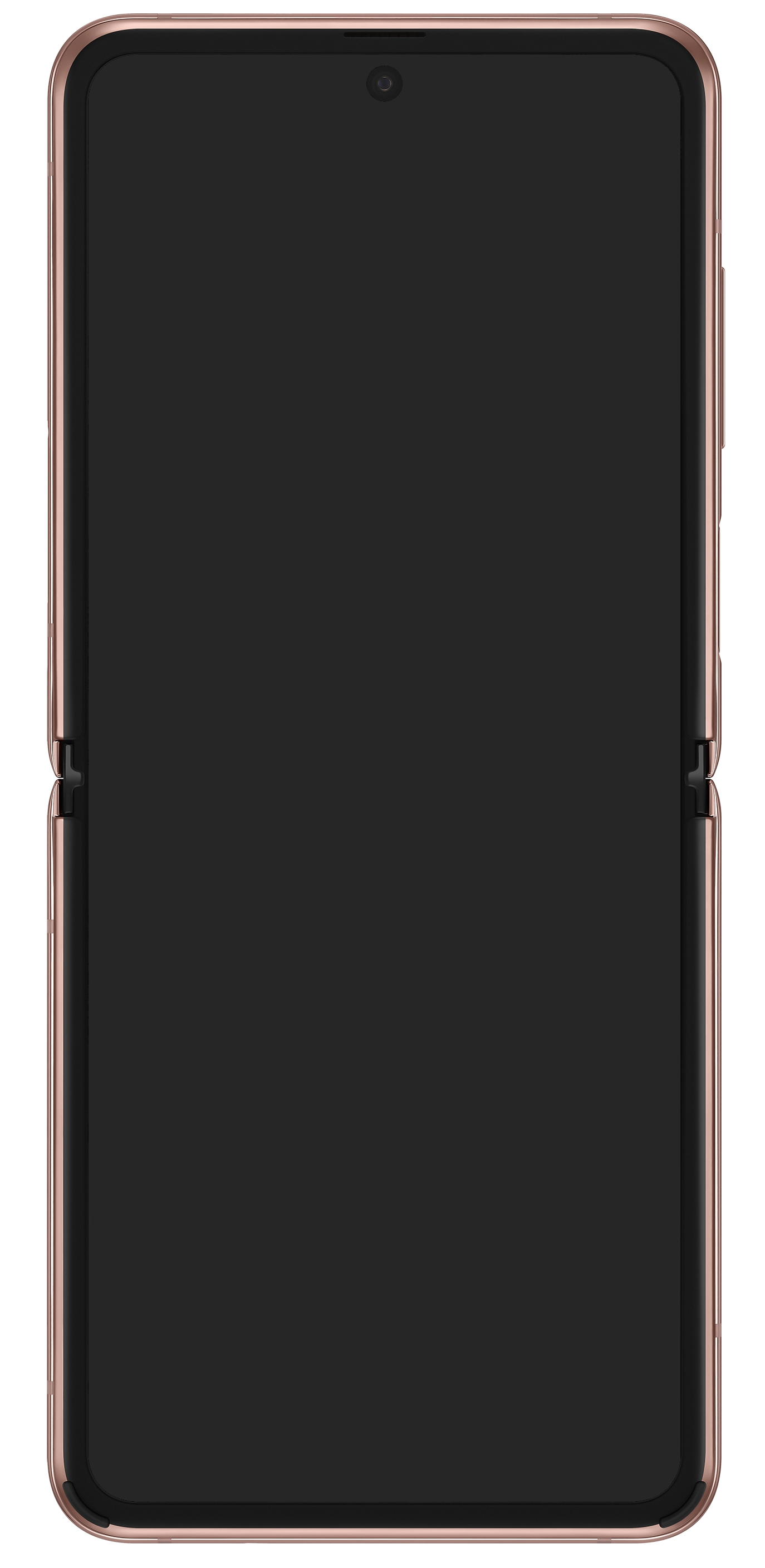
Unfolded Galaxy Z Flip in Mystic Bronze

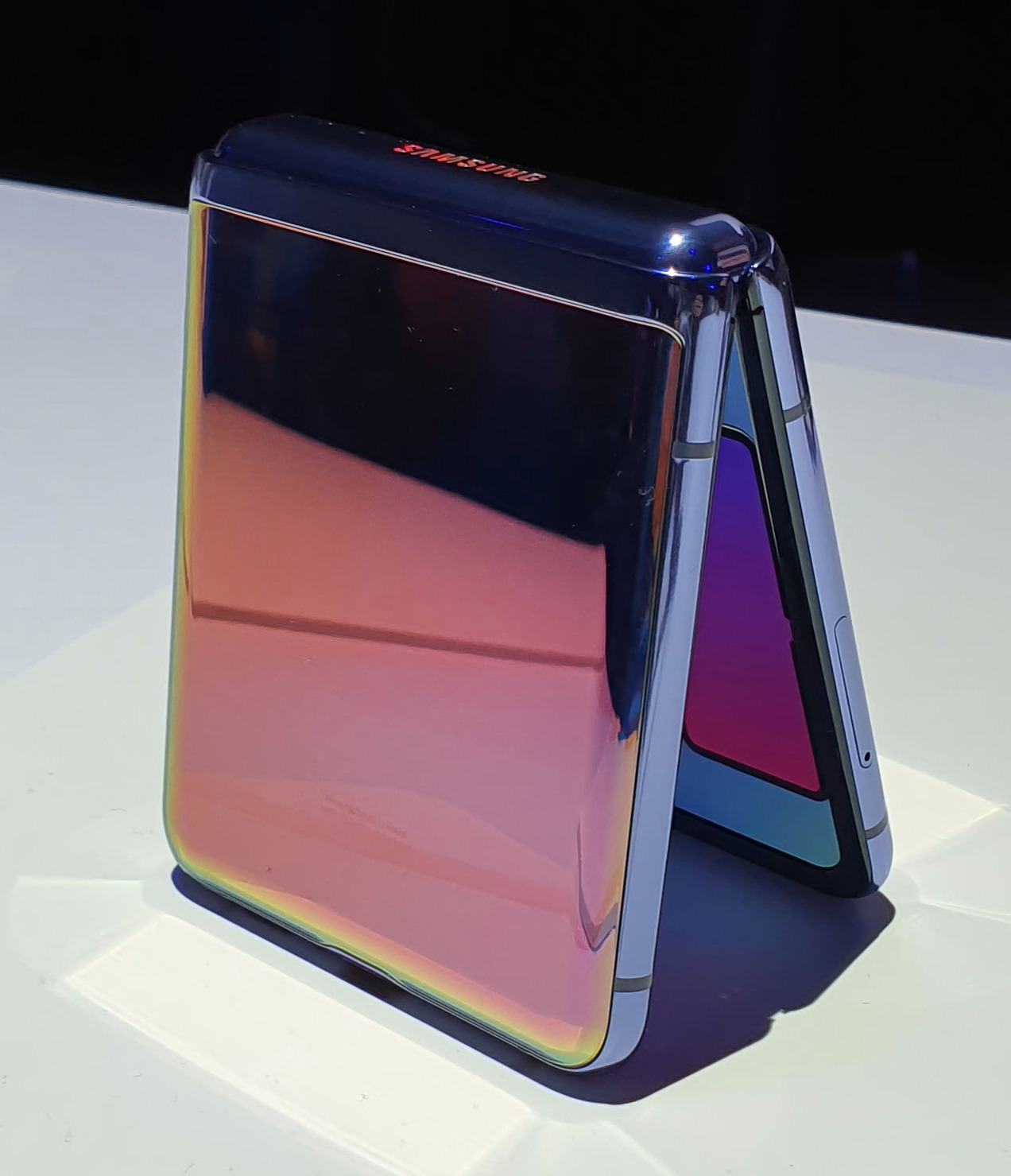
Galaxy Z Flip when folded

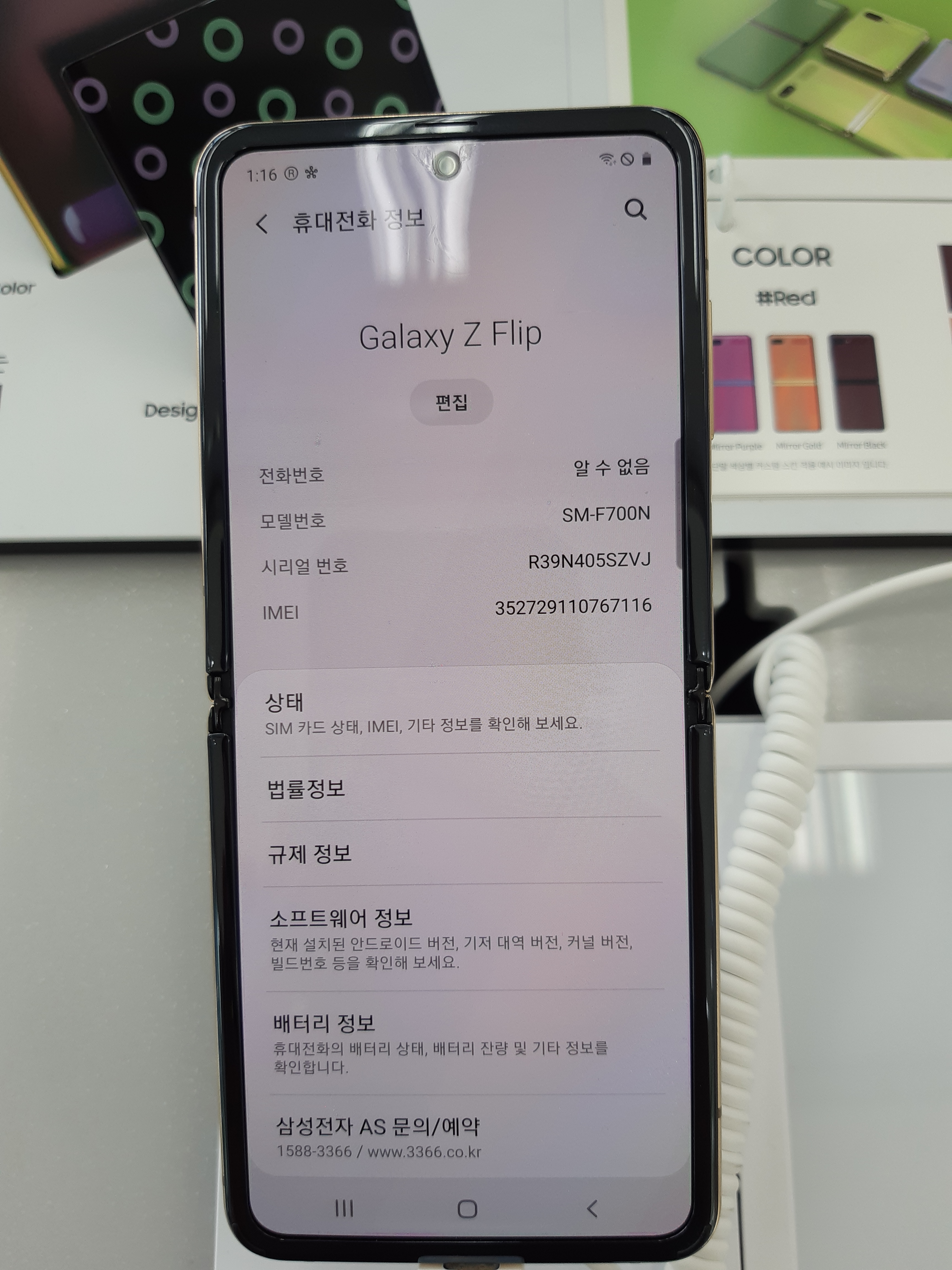
Galaxy Z Flip when opened

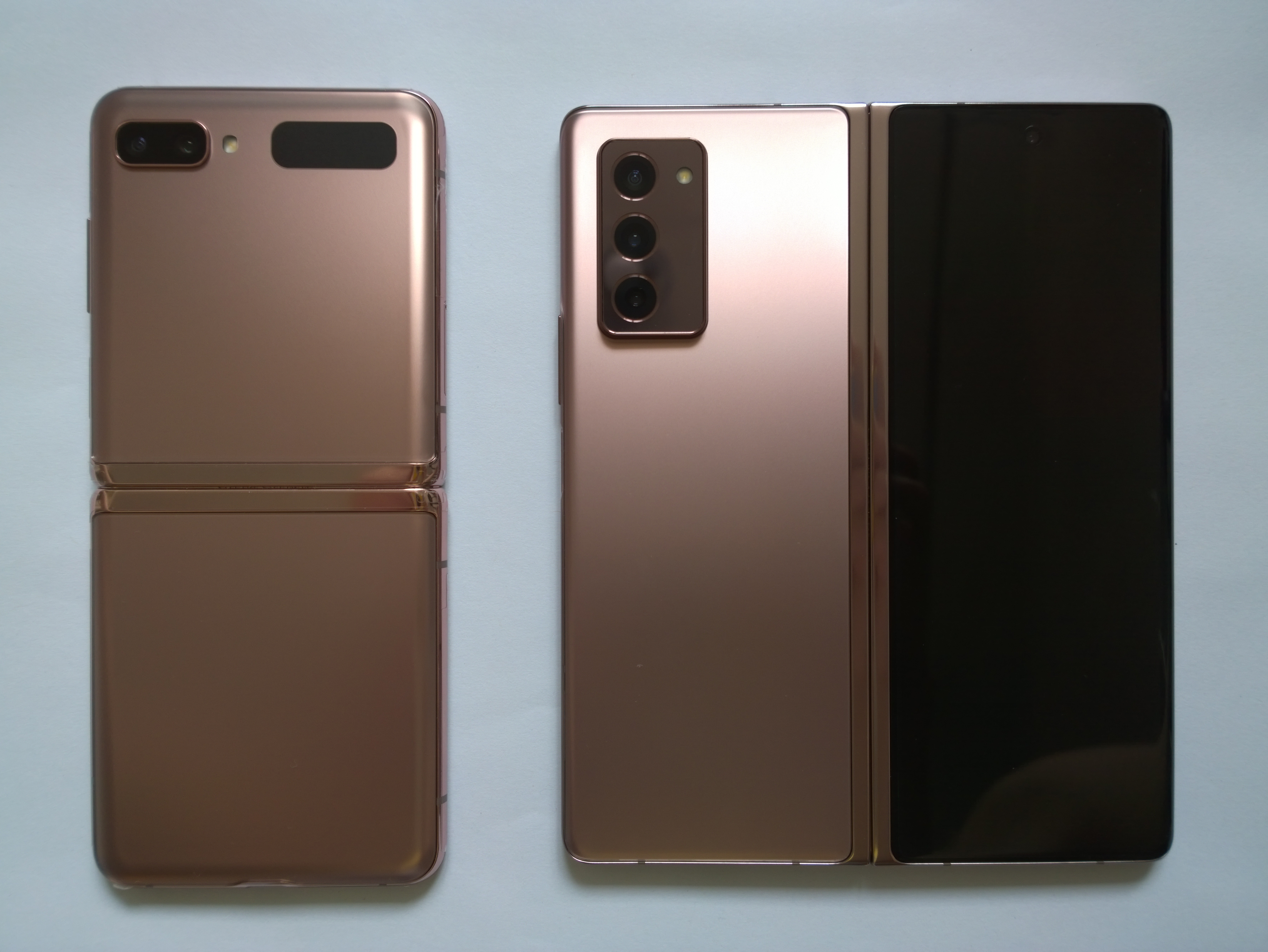
Unfolded Galaxy Z Flip & Z Fold 2

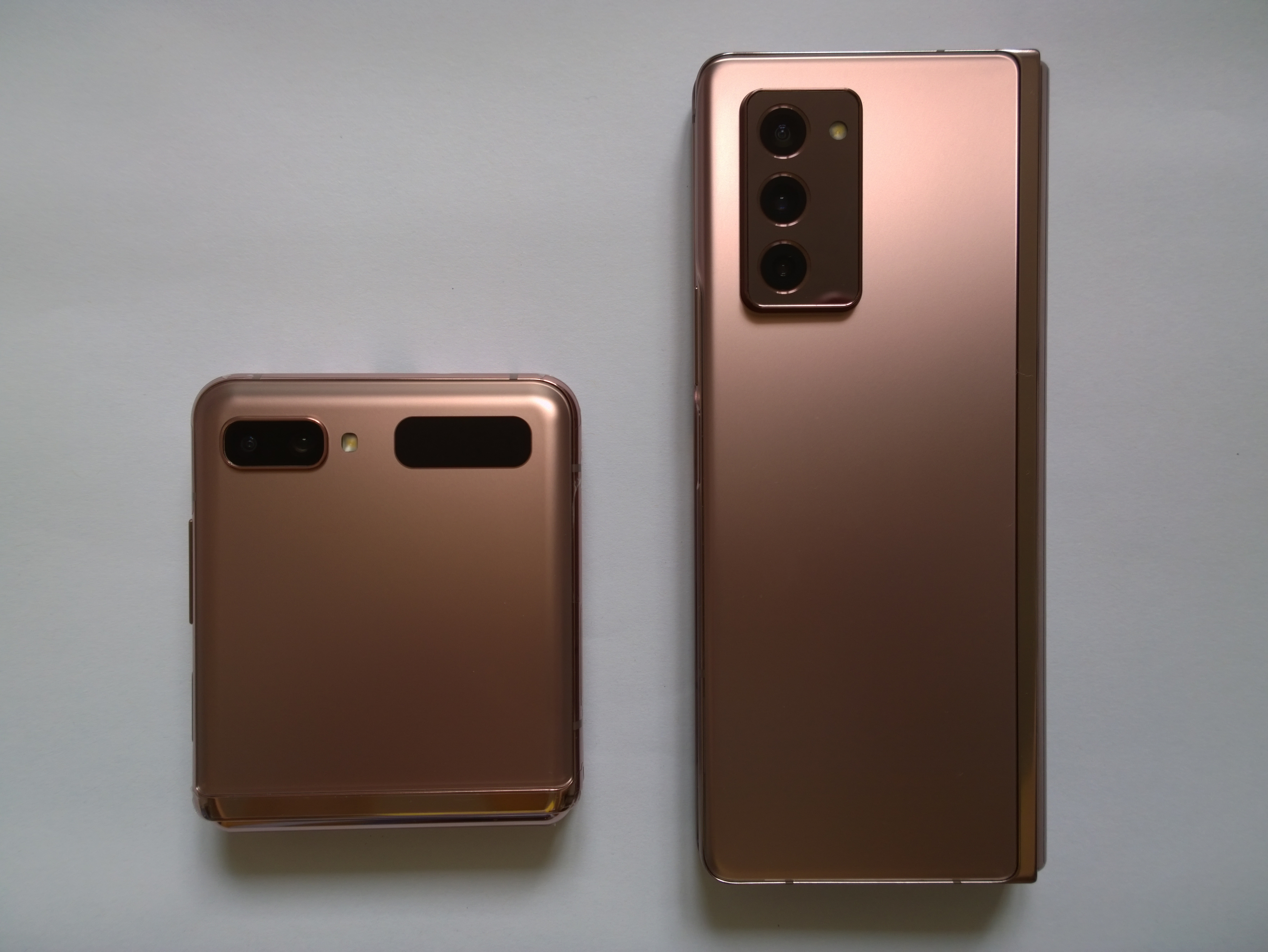
Galaxy Z Flip & Z Fold 2 when folded

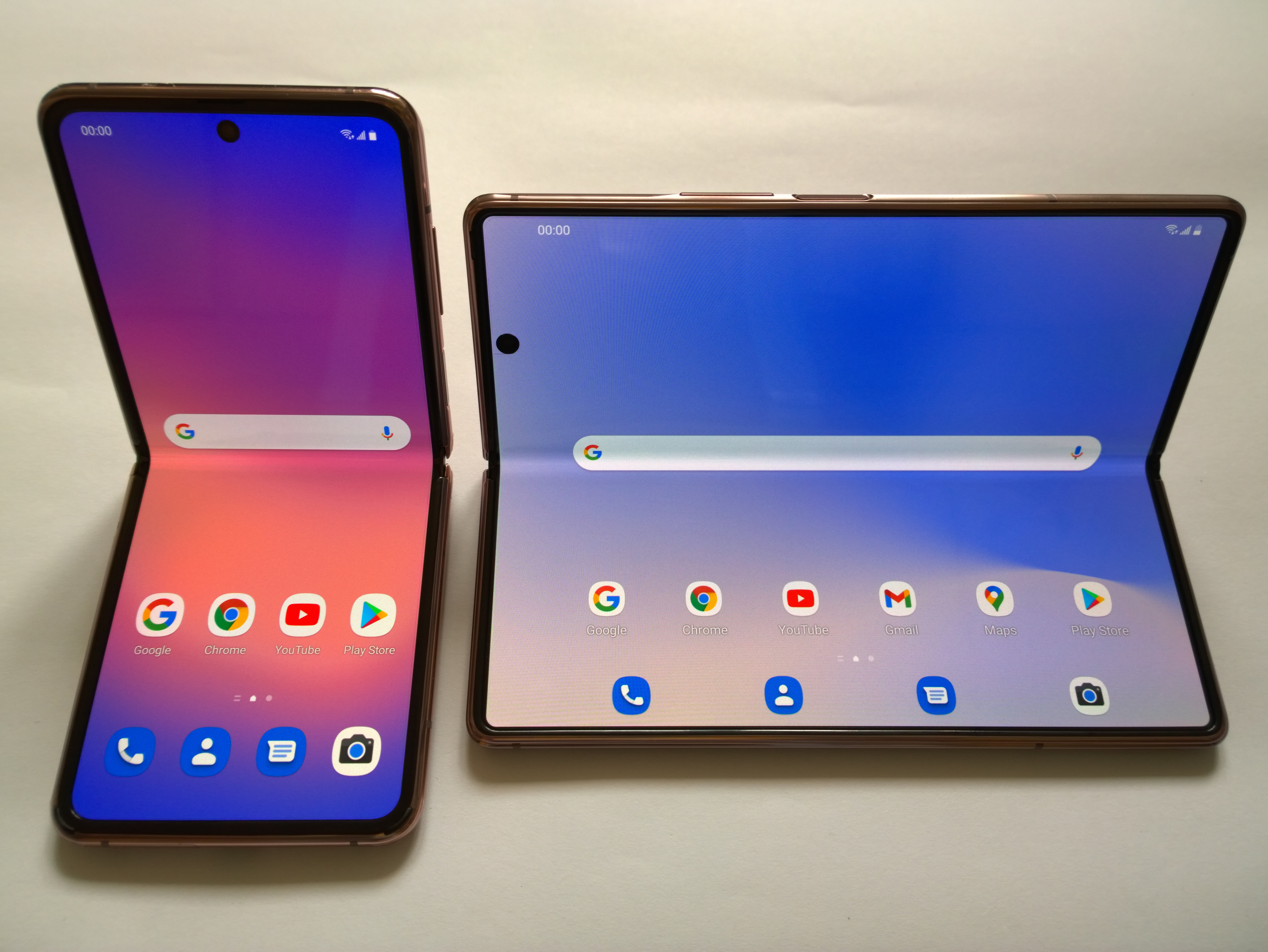
Galaxy Z Flip & Z Fold 2 when opened

== See also ==
- Huawei Mate X
- Xiaomi Mi MIX Alpha
- Motorola Razr (2020)
- Samsung Galaxy Z series
- Samsung Galaxy Fold

Preceded by N/A	Samsung Galaxy Z Flip; 2020	Succeeded by Samsung Galaxy Z Flip 3
