= Motorola Razr (2020) =

2019 Android-based foldable smartphone produced by Motorola Mobility

Motorola Razr Motorola Razr 5G
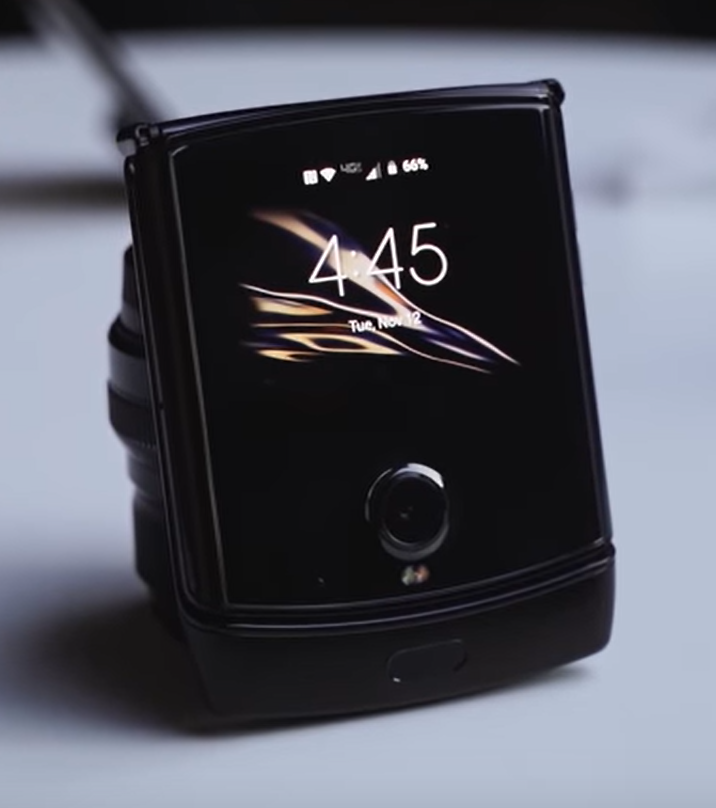
- The Razr folded
- Manufacturer: Motorola Mobility
- Type: Flip phone
- First released: 4G: 14 November 2019; 6 years ago 5G: 9 September 2020; 6 years ago
- Availability by region: 4G: 6 February 2020; 6 years ago 5G: 15 September 2020; 6 years ago
- Predecessor: None
- Successor: Motorola Razr 2022
- Form factor: Clamshell
- Dimensions: Unfolded (4G); 172 mm (6.8 in) H; 72 mm (2.8 in) W; 6.9 mm (0.27 in) D; Unfolded (5G); 169.2 mm (6.66 in) H; 72.6 mm (2.86 in) W; 7.9 mm (0.31 in) D; Folded (4G); 94 mm (3.7 in) H; 72 mm (2.8 in) W; 14 mm (0.55 in) D; Folded (5G); 91.7 mm (3.61 in) H; 72.6 mm (2.86 in) W; 16 mm (0.63 in) D
- Weight: 205 g (7.2 oz)
- Operating system: Original: Android 9.0 "Pie" (4G), Android 10 (5G); Current: Android 10 (4G), Android 14 (5G)
- System-on-chip: 4G: Qualcomm Snapdragon 710; 5G: Qualcomm Snapdragon 765G
- CPU: 4G: Octa-core (2x2.2 GHz and 6x2.42 GHz) Kryo 360 Gold & Silver; 5G: Octa-core (2x2.2 GHz and 6x2.42 GHz) Kryo 360 Gold & Silver
- GPU: 4G: Adreno 616; 5G: Adreno 620
- Memory: 6 GB (4G/LTE only) or 8 GB & 12 GB (5G only)
- Storage: 128 GB (4G/LTE only) or 256 GB & 512 GB (5G only)
- Removable storage: non-expandable
- Battery: 4G: 2510 mAh; 5G: 2800 mAh, 4000 mAh
- Charging: Fast charging 45W & Quick charge 15W
- Rear camera: 4G: 16 MP, f/1.7, 1.22μm, Dual-pixel PDAF, Dual-LED dual-tone flash, HDR, panorama, gyro-EIS; 4K@30fps, 1080p@30fps 5G: 50 MP, f/1.7, 0.8 μm, Dual-pixel PDAF, Dual-LED dual-tone flash, auto HDR, panorama, gyro-EIS; 4K@30fps, 1080p@30/60/120fps
- Front camera: 4G: 5 MP, f/2.0, 1.12 μm, HDR, 1080p@30fps 5G: 20 MP, f/2.2, 0.8 μm, auto HDR, 1080p@30/60fps
- Display: Foldable P-OLED, 876 × 2142, 6.2 in (16 cm), ~22:9 aspect ratio, 373 ppi
- External display: External G-OLED, 600 × 800, 2.7 in (6.9 cm), 4:3 aspect ratio, 370 ppi
- Connectivity: Bluetooth 5.0 Wi-Fi a/b/g/n/ac 3G/LTE/5G, Direct, Hotspot, GPS
- Data inputs: Sensors: Accelerometer; Fingerprint scanner (front-mounted in 4G/LTE, rear-mounted in 5G); Gyroscope; Proximity sensor; Compass (magnetometer); Barometer (5G only)
- Model: XT2000-1
- Website: www.motorola.com/us/products/razr

The Motorola Razr (stylized motorola razr, also known as RAZR 2019 or RAZR 2020) is an Android foldable smartphone produced by Motorola Mobility, unveiled on November 14, 2019 and released on February 6, 2020. It features a clamshell horizontally foldable main screen that is fully touchscreen. It marked a revival of the Razr line and was designed to be reminiscent of the Motorola Razr V3 produced in the 2000s.

The 2020 Razr was the first produced flip phone with a flexible display. The device was designed at Merchandise Mart in Chicago by a team at Motorola creatively managed by Ruben Castano and included Mike Jahnke who was part of the V3's early design. The Razr won a "Best of the Best" Red Dot Design Award.

An updated version of the phone, Motorola Razr 5G, was released on September 15, 2020. Motorola introduced a successor, Motorola Razr (2022), in August 2022.

== Specifications ==
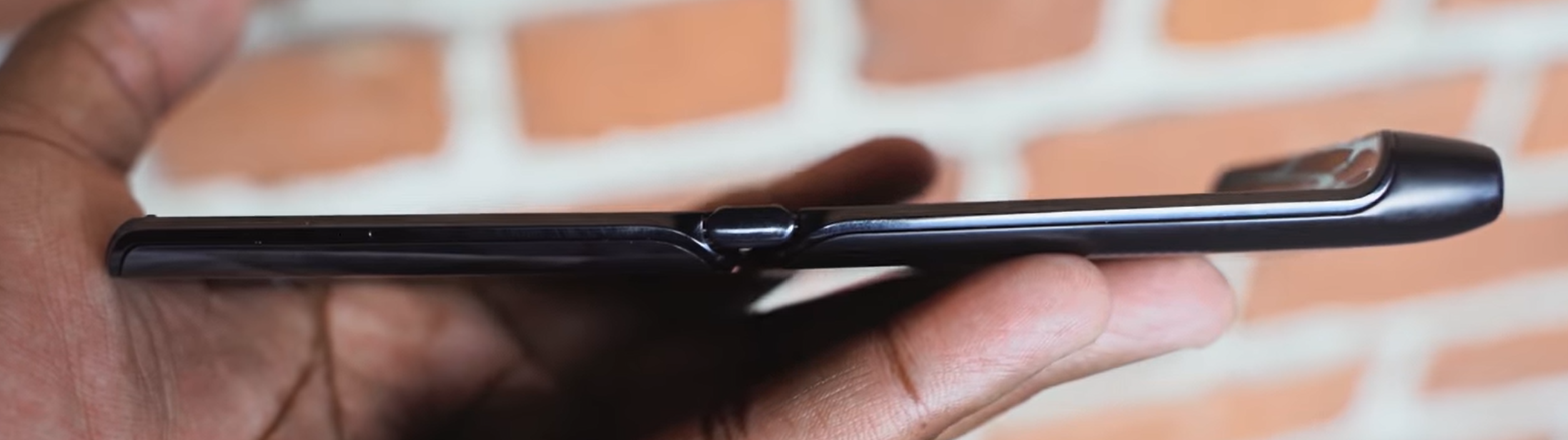
Side view of the Razr

The Razr is inspired heavily by the original feature phone line of the same name, and uses a clamshell design to conceal a 6.2-inch 21:9 OLED display. The device's exterior features a secondary 2.7-inch "Quick View" display to access selected features (such as notifications) when the device is closed. The screen is protected by a stainless-steel frame, is "scuff resistant", and has no visible crease at its folding point, with a fingerprint sensor located in the lower bezel. In response to concerns surrounding the Galaxy Fold, Motorola Mobility stated that it had "full confidence" in the durability of the phone's screen, that it would last the "average lifespan of a smartphone", and that they were "not going to go out there and say, consumers should be cautious of how they use the phone". The device was initially sold in a black finish. A second "Blush Gold" option was announced in February 2020. The Razr 2019 does not support physical SIM cards, and requires use of eSIM.

It is powered by the Qualcomm Snapdragon 710 system-on-chip and Adreno 616 GPU, with 6 GB of RAM and 128 GB of non-expandable internal storage. It uses two batteries which have a total capacity of 2510 mAh, and fast charging is supported at up to 15W over USB-C. A single camera is present on the rear with a 16 megapixel lens, while the front-facing camera has a 5 megapixel lens and is housed within a notch at the top of the display.

The Razr shipped with Android 9.0 "Pie", and received an update for Android 10 in mid-May 2020, adding theme support (carried over from the Motorola Edge+) and additional functionality to the Quick View display, such as virtual keyboard support, video calling, and Google Maps support. Motorola Mobility committed to supporting Android 11 as well. The software has a "Retro Razr" mode easter egg which changes the home screen to a recreation of the menu screen and keypad of the original Razr series.

=== Razr 5G ===
In September 2020, Motorola Mobility released an updated revision of the Razr branded as the Razr 5G, also known as the Razr 2 5G. Its design is nearly identical to the original model, but the fingerprint reader is re-located to the rear of the device. It now uses a Snapdragon 765G system-on-chip, with 8 GB of RAM and support for sub-6 GHz 5G wireless networks. Its cameras were also upgraded, with a 20 megapixel front-facing camera, and 48-megapixel rear-facing camera with laser autofocus and optical image stabilization. In the United States, the Razr 5G is exclusive to AT&T Mobility and T-Mobile. The Razr 5G model brings back the physical SIM slot.

== Reception ==
The Razr was met with mixed reviews at launch, with several reviewers making comparisons to the Samsung Galaxy Z Flip. Common criticisms included the price, poor battery life and camera, sub-flagship level performance, Verizon exclusivity and bloatware, and an unrefined hinge and display, while praise went to the compact form factor, retro design and stock software. Patrick Holland of CNET gave the device a 7.5/10, praising the design, form factor and usability. Holland was impressed with the secondary Quick View display, but noted that the wide aspect ratio caused pillarboxing for apps and movies, and that the user interface was not well optimized for one-handed use. Sascha Segan of PC Magazine gave the device a 2.5/5, additionally panning the device for weak wireless performance, concluding that "Motorola [Mobility]'s gorgeous folding Razr doesn't deliver the performance you expect from a $1,500 phone".

Julian Chokkattu of Wired gave the Razr a 4/10, stating that "Motorola [Mobility]'s first foldable smartphone makes a good case for the return of the clamshell design, but the Razr is still stuck in the past". Dieter Bohn of The Verge gave the device a 4/10, stating that "if this phone didn't fold, I wouldn't recommend it at one-sixth of its current price". Adam Ismail of Tom's Guide likewise stated that “[the Razr’s] myriad shortcomings — from its fragility, to its performance, to its camera and battery life — mean it's not worth the $1,500 plunge.”

iFixit gave the Razr a repairability score of 1/10, deeming it "the most complicated phone-based contraption we've ever taken apart".

== Versions ==
This information may be incomplete

Razr model numbers
Model Number	Year	Band	Memory	Network	Info/Color
XT2000-1	2019	4G	128GB	Verizon	Noir Black, Blush Gold (sometimes "XT20001G")
XT2000-2	2019	4G	128GB	Unlocked	Noir Black
XT2071-2	2020	5G	256GB	AT&T	Polished Graphite (also Blush Gold and Mercury)
XT2071-3	2020	5G	256GB	Verizon	Polished Graphite (also Blush Gold and Mercury)
XT2071-4	2020	5G	256GB	"International" (Dual Sim)	Polished Graphite (also Blush Gold and Mercury)
XT2071-5	2020	5G	256GB	T-Mobile	Polished Graphite (also Blush Gold and Mercury)

== See also ==
- Huawei Mate X
- Xiaomi Mi MIX Alpha
- Samsung Galaxy Z Flip
