= Xiaomi Mi MIX 2 =

Android phablet

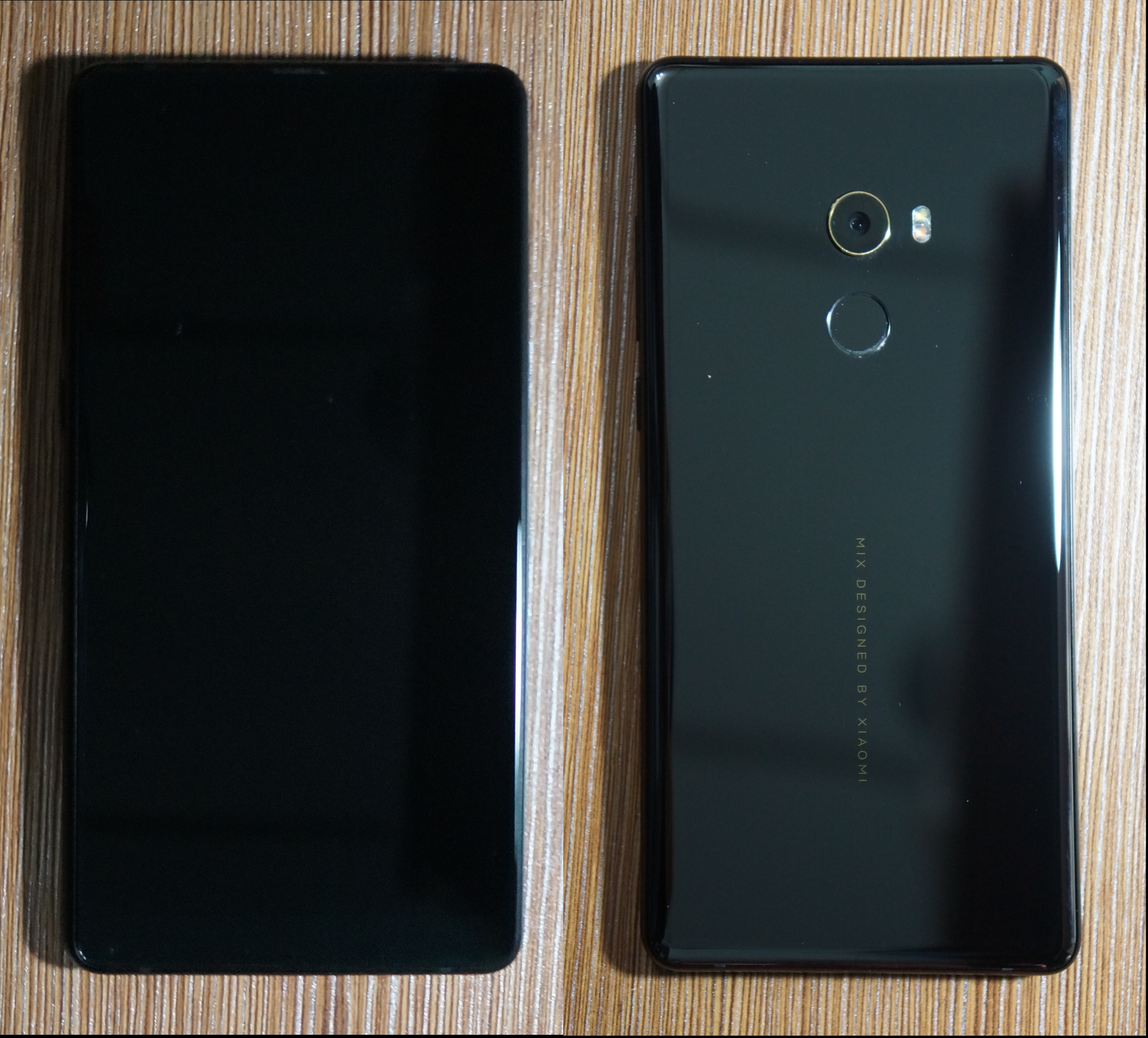
- Manufacturer: Xiaomi
- Type: Phablet
- Series: Mi MIX
- First released: September 2017; 8 years ago
- Predecessor: Xiaomi Mi MIX
- Successor: Xiaomi Mi MIX 3
- Related: Xiaomi Mi MIX 2S
- Form factor: Slate
- Dimensions: 151.8 mm × 75.5 mm × 7.7 mm (5.98 in × 2.97 in × 0.30 in)
- Weight: 185 g (6.5 oz)
- Operating system: Android 7.1 "Nougat" (MIUI 8) Upgradeable to Android 9.0 "Pie" (MIUI 12)
- System-on-chip: Qualcomm Snapdragon 835
- CPU: Octa-core (4×2.45 GHz & 4×2.19 GHz) Kryo
- GPU: Adreno 540
- Memory: 6 or 8 GB LPDDR4x RAM
- Storage: 64, 128 or 256 GB UFS 2.1
- Battery: 3400 mAh,
- Rear camera: 12 MP (1.25 μm) Sony Exmor RS imx386, f/2.0, 4K at 30 fps, 1080p at 30 fps, 720p at 120 fps
- Front camera: 5 MP, f/2.0, OmniVision OV5675
- Display: 1080×2160 1080p IPS LCD, 5.99 in (152 mm), (403 ppi)
- Connectivity: USB-C
- Data inputs: Sensors: Accelerometer; Barometer; Compass; Fingerprint scanner; Geomagnetic sensor; Gyroscope; Hall sensor; Proximity sensor; Light sensor; Rotation vector sensor; Linear acceleration sensor; Gravity sensor; Pressure sensor
- Codename: chiron
- Website: www.mi.com/en/mix2/

Xiaomi Mi MIX 2 is an Android phablet manufactured by Xiaomi. It was first announced and released in China in September 2017 and later was launched in India at an event in Delhi on 10 October 2017. It is the successor to the Xiaomi Mi MIX. The ceramic body was designed by Philippe Starck.

== Specifications ==
=== Hardware ===
The Mi MIX 2 is powered by the Qualcomm Snapdragon 835 processor, with either 6 or 8 GB LPDDR4X RAM. It has a 5.99 inches (152 mm) 1080p IPS LCD, and features a 4-axis OIS camera system. Storage options include 64, 128 or 256 GB in China, but only 128 GB in India. The handset features a fingerprint scanner on the rear, and a front camera on the lower. It features a 3,400 mAh battery with a USB-C reversible connector which supports Quick Charge 3.0. It also has a four-sided curved ceramic body. It does not feature a 3.5mm headphone jack and comes with a USB-C to 3.5mm headphone jack adapter provided in the box.

=== Software ===
It comes with Android 7.0 "Nougat" with Xiaomi's MIUI 9 custom skin pre-installed.

== Xiaomi Mi MIX 2S ==
Xiaomi unveiled a new version of the Mi MIX 2, the Mi MIX 2S, on March 27, 2018. Powered by the Qualcomm Snapdragon 845, it features the same 5.99 inches (152 mm) 1080p IPS LCD found on the Mi MIX 2, a new dual 12 MP camera, Qi wireless charging, and is pre-loaded with Android 8.0 Oreo. The Mi MIX 2S received a score of 97 on DxOMark.

== Reception ==
In August 2017, it was awarded the IDEA Gold Award for its design.

In reviews, the general feedback was favorable, with critics praising the more accessible elements of it over the original Mi Mix such as worldwide LTE bands, a lower price than the original Mi Mix, a smaller display and a traditional earpiece speaker to replace the piezoelectric speaker in the original Mi Mix. Users are reporting 4G connection issues in France on Orange and Bouygues Networks. Also, the phone does not support 4G+ Carrier Aggregation Intern and (B3+ B7) which is widely used in Europe.

Preceded by Xiaomi Mi MIX	Xiaomi Mi MIX 2; 2017	Succeeded by Xiaomi Mi MIX 2S
