= Xiaomi Mi 9 =

2019 Smartphones manufactured by Xiaomi

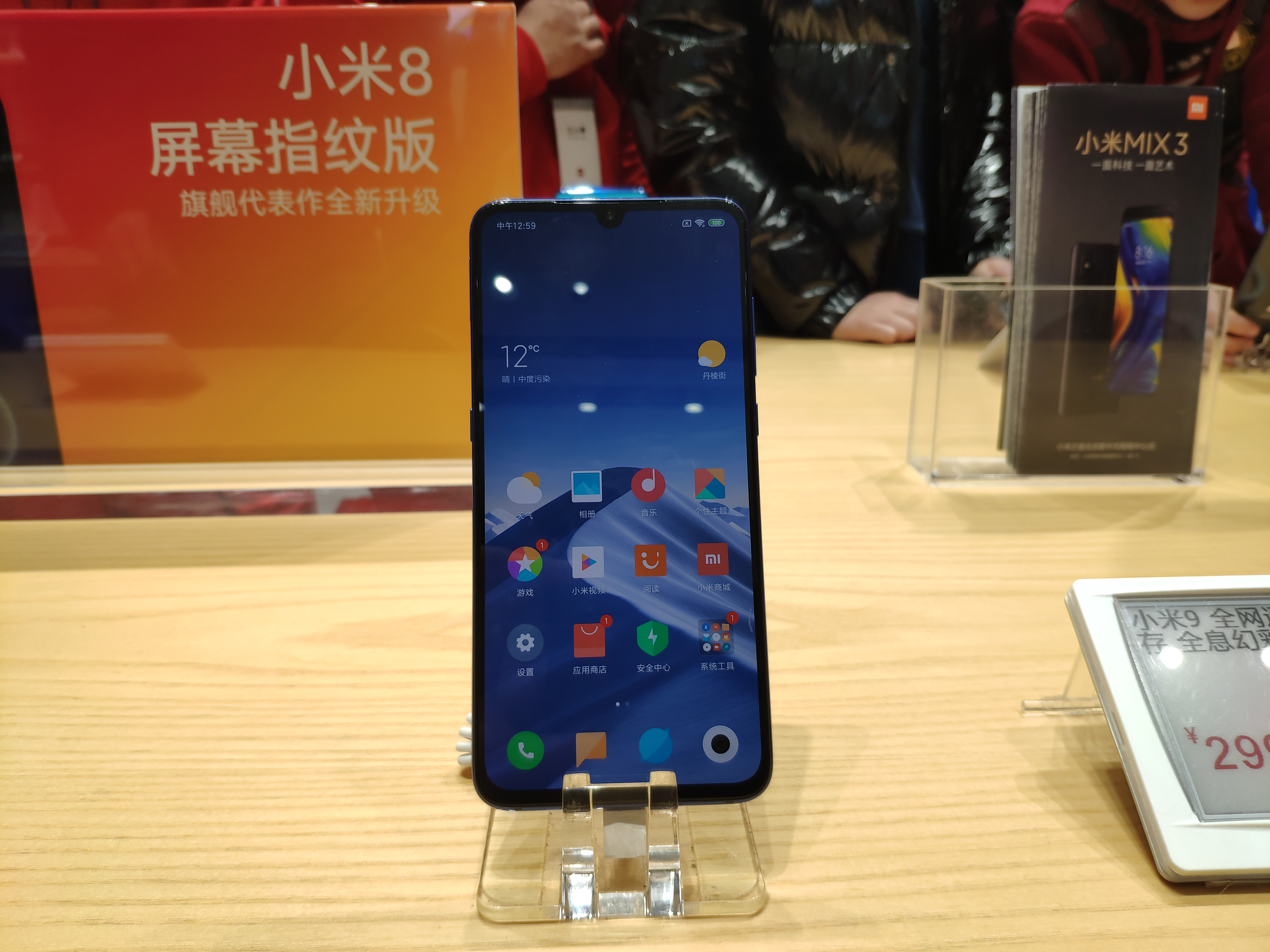
- Manufacturer: Xiaomi
- Type: Touchscreen smartphone
- Series: Mi
- First released: March 2019; 7 years ago (Mi 9); April 2019; 7 years ago (Mi 9 Explorer)
- Predecessor: Xiaomi Mi 8
- Successor: Xiaomi Mi 10
- Related: Xiaomi Mi 9 Pro
- Form factor: Slate
- Dimensions: 157.5 mm (6.20 in) H; 74.7 mm (2.94 in) W; 7.6 mm (0.30 in) D
- Weight: 173 g (6.1 oz)
- Operating system: Original: MIUI 10 based on Android 9 Pie; Current: MIUI 12.5 based on Android 11
- System-on-chip: Qualcomm Snapdragon 855
- CPU: Octa-core Kryo 485 (1x 2.84 GHz + 3x 2.42 GHz + 4x 1.8 GHz)
- GPU: Adreno 640
- Memory: 6 GB or 8 GB LPDDR4X RAM; 8 GB or 12 GB LPDDR4X RAM (Mi 9 Explorer)
- Storage: 64 GB or 128 GB; 256 GB (Mi 9 Explorer)
- Removable storage: None
- Battery: Non-removable Li-Po 3300 mAh battery
- Rear camera: Triple: 48 MP Wide (f/1.5 (Mi 9 Explorer 12 GB RAM) or f/1.8, 27mm, 1/2", 0.8μm) + 16 MP Ultrawide (f/2.2, 13mm, 1/3", 1.0μm) + 12 MP Telephoto (f/2.2, 54mm, 1/3.6" 1.0μm), 2x optical zoom, laser/phase detection autofocus, dual-LED flash
- Front camera: 20 MP (f/2.0, 0.9μm), 1080p
- Display: 6.39 inches (162.3 mm), 1080 x 2340 pixels, (403 ppi), SUPER AMOLED touchscreen, 16M colors HDR10; DCI-P3
- Connectivity: 2G, 3G, 4G, 4G LTE, Wi-Fi 802.11a/b/g/n/ac (2.4 & 5GHz), dual-band, WiFi Direct, DLNA, hotspot
- Data inputs: Dual band GNSS (GPS/GLONASS/BeiDou/Galileo) Bluetooth V5, A2DP, Low-energy, aptX HD
- Codename: cepheus
- Website: Mi 9

The Xiaomi Mi 9 is a flagship Android smartphone developed by Xiaomi Inc. It was announced in February 2019.

== Specifications ==
=== Hardware ===
The Xiaomi Mi 9 is powered by the Qualcomm Snapdragon 855 processor, with 6 GB or 8 GB LPDDR4X RAM and the Adreno 640 GPU. It has a 6.39-inch (162 mm) FHD+ AMOLED display. Storage options include 64 GB or 128 GB. The handset features a fingerprint scanner under the display. It features a 3300 mAh battery with a USB-C reversible connector which supports Quick Charge 4.0+. Externally, it has a smaller notch and new gradient colors, with Gorilla Glass 6 on the front, Gorilla Glass 5 on the rear and a 7000 series aluminum frame. It does not feature a 3.5mm headphone jack and comes with a USB-C to 3.5mm headphone jack adapter provided in the box. The Mi 9 includes a triple camera setup with a 48 MP wide angle lens, a 16 MP ultra-wide angle lens and a 12 MP telephoto lens. The front camera has a 20 MP sensor with an aperture of f/2.0. The Explorer variant has larger storage and RAM options, a transparent back, a 7P camera lens, and an f/1.5 (wider) aperture for the main lens on models with 12 GB of RAM.

=== Software ===
It runs on Android 9, with Xiaomi's custom MIUI 10 skin but it is upgradable to Android 11 and MIUI 12.5.

== Variants ==
=== Mi 9 Pro/Mi 9 Pro 5G ===
On September 24, 2019, Xiaomi announced the Mi 9 Pro and Mi 9 Pro 5G which have upgraded chipsets, faster charging, larger batteries, increased storage and RAM, and new software.

== Reception ==
Digital Trends praised the Mi 9's performance, screen, design and in-display fingerprint sensor but remarked that the camera could be better and that the software needed improvement. Trusted Reviews had similar opinions, and was less impressed with the in-display fingerprint sensor and more positive with the camera, concluding that the Mi 9 had "the makings of one of the most worthwhile flagship smartphone purchases of the year". Digital Trends wrote that the Mi 9 was "a compelling, high-performance smartphone that's sure to become one of the year's best" and "one of 2019's shrewdest smartphone purchases".

DxOMark gave the Mi 9's camera an overall score of 110, with a photo score of 115 and a video score of 99, ranking it as their fourth best smartphone camera. DxOMark remarks that the phone "takes things to a whole new level, placing the Chinese company's latest flagship model firmly into the big league of smartphone cameras—right up there with the heavy-hitters from Apple, Samsung, and Huawei".

== Issues ==
The Xiaomi Mi 9 faces a handful of minor issues, however, it faces major issues that are restrained to certain regions, such as the lack of facial recognition in some Western regions, although it was fixed with a software update.

The frequent display of advertisements in MIUI is no different in the Mi 9, Xiaomi defended themselves by saying that these ads help them keep their prices low.
