= Samsung Galaxy Z Flip 3 =

2021 foldable smartphone by Samsung Electronics

Samsung Galaxy Z Flip 3 Samsung Galaxy Z Flip 3 Bespoke Edition

- Two Galaxy Z Flip 3 units, folded, in Lavender and Cream colors
- Also known as: Samsung Galaxy Flip 3 (in certain European countries)
- Brand: Samsung
- Manufacturer: Samsung Electronics
- Type: Foldable smartphone
- Series: Galaxy Z
- Family: Samsung Galaxy
- First released: Z Flip 3: August 27, 2021; 5 years ago Z Flip 3 Bespoke Edition: October 20, 2021; 5 years ago
- Availability by region: Z Flip 3: August 27, 2021; 5 years ago Z Flip 3 Bespoke Edition: October 20, 2021; 5 years ago
- Discontinued: August 10, 2022; 4 years ago
- Predecessor: Samsung Galaxy Z Flip
- Successor: Samsung Galaxy Z Flip 4
- Related: Samsung Galaxy S21; Samsung Galaxy Z Fold 3
- Compatible networks: 2G, 3G, 4G, 4G LTE, 5G
- Form factor: Foldable slate
- Dimensions: Unfolded: 166 mm (6.5 in) H 72.2 mm (2.84 in) W 6.9 mm (0.27 in) D Folded: 86.4 mm (3.40 in) H 72.2 mm (2.84 in) W 15.9–17.1 mm (0.63–0.67 in) D
- Weight: 183 g (6.5 oz)
- Operating system: Original: Android 11 with One UI 3.1.1; Current: Android 15 with One UI 7
- System-on-chip: Qualcomm Snapdragon 888
- CPU: Octa-core (1x2.84 GHz, 3x2.40 GHz and 4x1.80 GHz) Kryo 680
- GPU: Adreno 660
- Memory: 8 GB LPDDR5 RAM
- Storage: 128 or 256 GB UFS 3.1
- Removable storage: non-expandable
- SIM: nanoSIM, eSIM
- Battery: 3300 mAh
- Rear camera: 12 MP, f/1.8, 27mm, 1/2.55", 1.4μm (wide) + 12 MP, f/2.2, 12mm, 1.12μm (ultrawide), Dual Pixel PDAF, OIS, LED flash, HDR10+, panorama, 4K@30/60fps, 1080p@60/240fps, 720p@960fps
- Front camera: 10 MP, f/2.4, 26mm, 1.22μm, PDAF, HDR, 4K@30fps
- Display: Dynamic AMOLED 2X, HDR10+, 1080 × 2640, 6.7 in (17 cm), 22:9 aspect ratio, 426 ppi, HDR10+, 120 Hz refresh rate
- External display: Super AMOLED, 260 × 512, 1.9 in (4.8 cm), ~2:1 aspect ratio, 302 ppi
- Sound: Dolby Atmos stereo speakers
- Connectivity: Bluetooth 5.1 Wi-Fi a/b/g/n/ac/6
- Data inputs: Accelerometer; Barometer; Capacitive touchscreen; Fingerprint scanner (side-mounted); Pressure sensor; Gyroscope; Hall sensor; Proximity sensor; Magnetometer; Power button; Volume rocker
- Water resistance: IPX8, up to 1.5 m (4.9 ft) for 30 minutes
- Model: SM-F711B; SCG12 (Japan; au); SC-54B (Japan; NTT Docomo)
- Codename: Project B2
- Other: Physical sound volume keys USB-C 2.0
- Website: "SM-F711UZKFXAA | Galaxy Z Flip3 5G 256GB (Unlocked) | Samsung Business US". Samsung Electronics America.

The Samsung Galaxy Z Flip 3 (stylized as Samsung Galaxy Z Flip3, sold as Samsung Galaxy Flip 3 in certain territories) is a clamshell-styled foldable smartphone manufactured, developed and marketed by Samsung Electronics as part of its Galaxy Z series. Released in August 2021, it shipped originally with Android 11, but is upgradable to Android 15 with One UI 7.

It is the successor to the original Z Flip, although Samsung skipped the number two and branded it as the Flip 3 to align with the branding of the accompanying Z Fold model (Fold 3, announced at the same time). Compared to its first generation predecessor, Samsung attempted to deal with some of its criticism by giving the Galaxy Z Flip 3 a tougher "armor aluminium" frame with supposed durability and a PET screen layer. It also introduced water resistance, 120Hz framerate display and a much more functional, larger (1.9 inch) external display.

The Galaxy Z Flip 3 sold much better than its predecessor, as much as forty-fold in its first month in the United States, becoming the best-selling foldable smartphone globally during the end of 2021 and throughout 2022. Its more accessible price point also made it the very first "mainstream" foldable smartphone and it was accoladed as one of the best inventions of 2021 by Time magazine. Critics generally praised its new two-tone design, display quality, price tag, and nostalgic flip phone novelty, but there remained concerns about its screen durability and its battery life was heavily derided.

== History ==
It was announced on August 11, 2021 and released on August 27, 2021, at the Samsung's Galaxy Unpacked event alongside the Galaxy Z Fold 3 and the Galaxy Watch 4. It came in in four colors: Cream, Phantom Black, Green, and Lavender.

In Baltic markets, the Samsung Galaxy Z Flip 3 started being marketed as Samsung Galaxy Flip 3 without the letter Z in the aftermath of the Russian Invasion of Ukraine, in March 2022.

The Bespoke Edition model was announced and released on October 20, 2021. This one also featured exclusive colors: Grey, White, Pink, Blue, and Yellow. This edition is a collaboration with Samsung's Bespoke refrigerator that enables customers to freely customize the colors of the fridge doors. Following the same concept, the Galaxy Z Flip 3 Bespoke Edition also provides color customizing services. Customers get to mix and match the five colors for the top and bottom part of the phone. Unlike the official edition, in which the color of hinge changes based on the color of the phone, the color of hinge from the Bespoke edition is limited to silver and black.

The Galaxy Z Flip 3 was succeeded by the Galaxy Z Flip 4 on August 10, 2022. Software support and security updates for the Galaxy Z Flip 3 ended in September 2026.

== Specifications ==
=== Design ===
BTS singer Jin shown with a Galaxy Z Flip 3, the band being a brand ambassador for the product

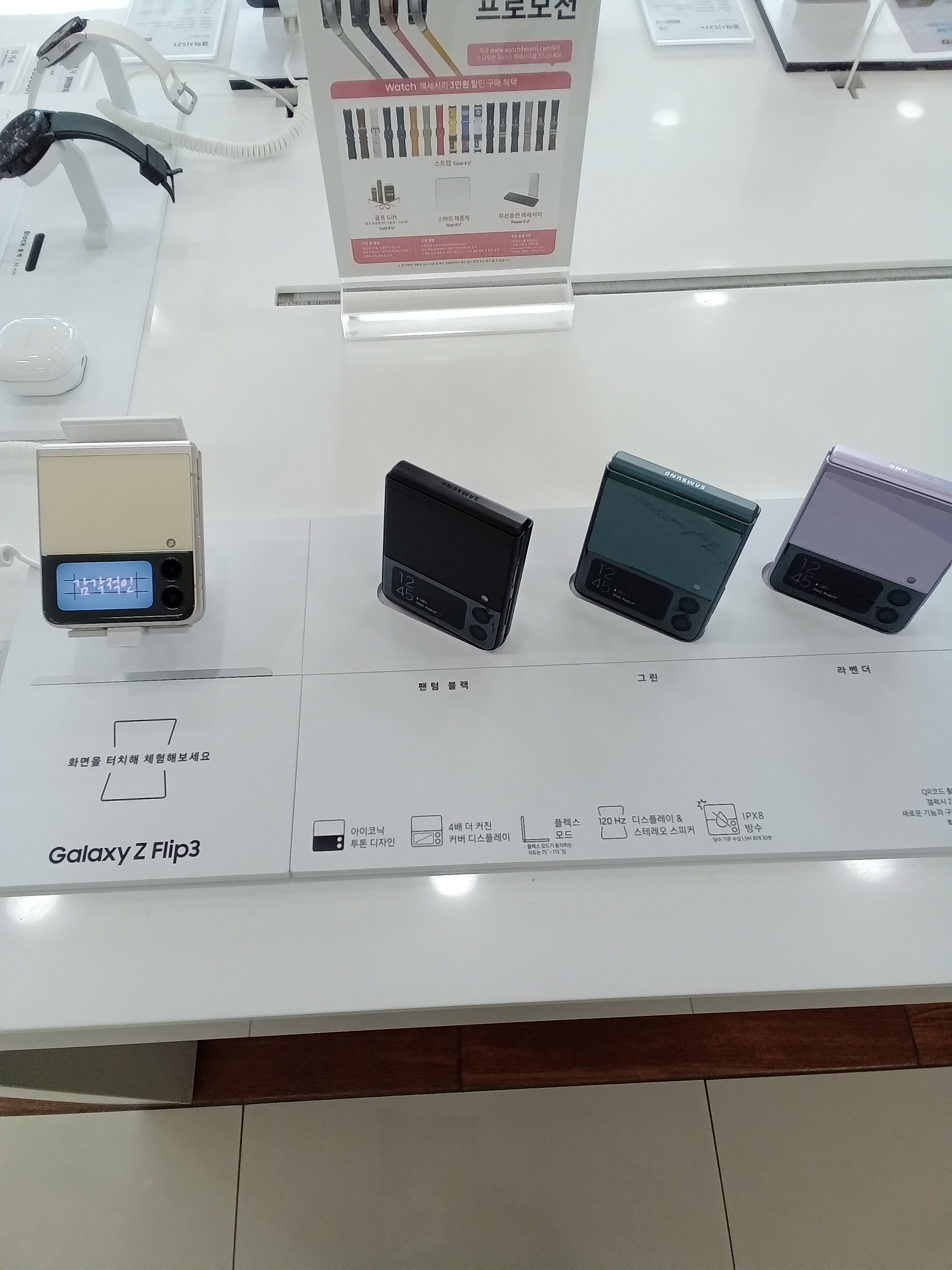
Folded Samsung Galaxy Z Flip 3 units in its four colors

The Z Flip 3 uses the same clamshell design as the first Z Flip with an aluminum frame, it has a 6.7-inch display protected by ultra-thin glass made by Samsung that can be folded into a space of 4.2-in. Once it is folded, the Samsung logo shows up by the center of the hinge. This logo design and placement is identical to its previous model, the Galaxy Z Flip. It also adopts 1.9-inch cover screen, which is a most notable change from 1.1-inches in the previous model. This change in cover screen enables users to download widgets such as Music, Weather, Alarm, Timer, Voice recorder, Today's schedule, Samsung Health, and Bluetooth.

=== Hardware ===
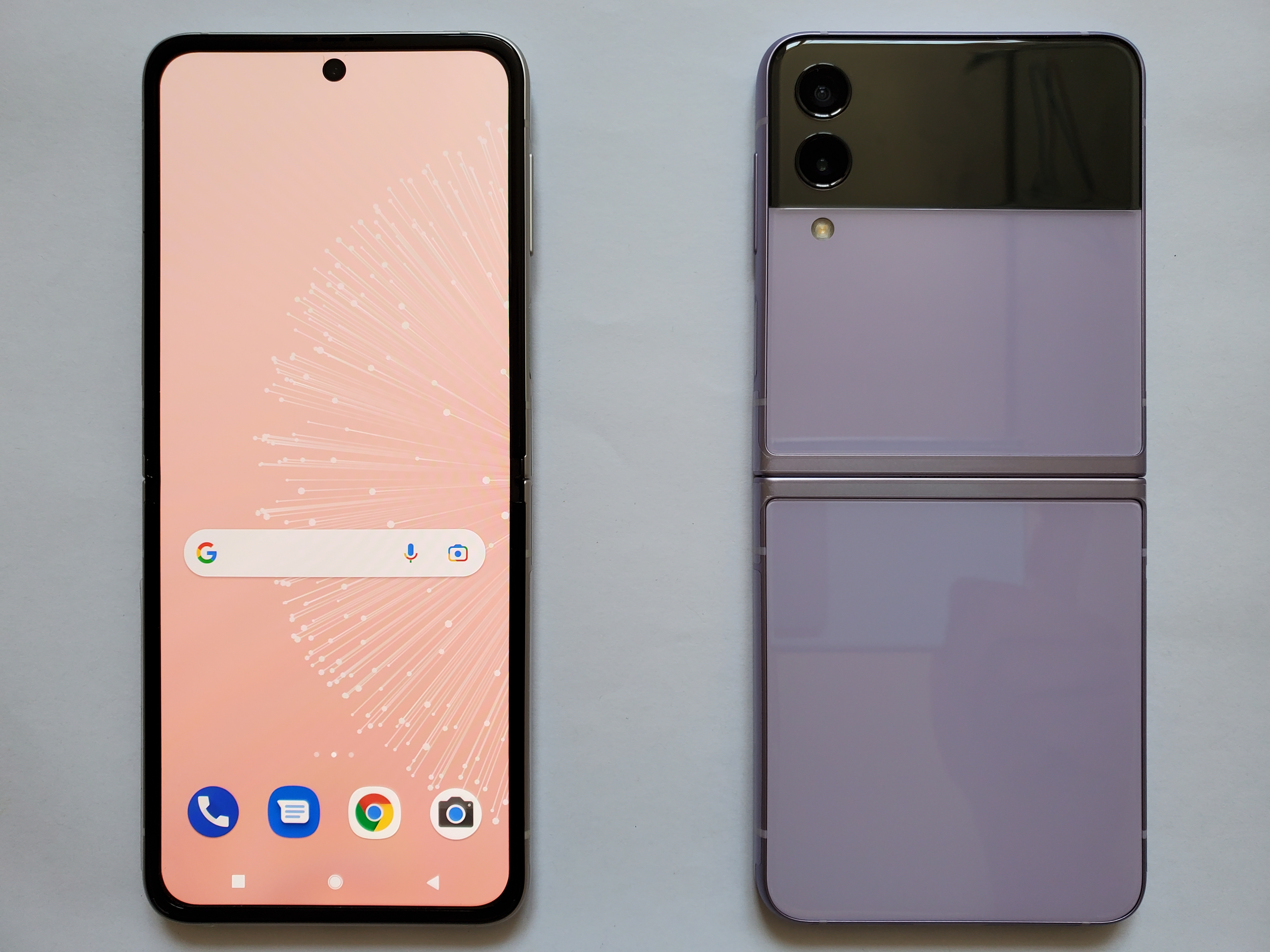
The phone fully unfolded

The Z Flip 3 features a 6.7-in 22:9 AMOLED display with support for 120 Hz refresh rate and also features support for HDR10+. The screen features a hole punch camera cutout for the front facing camera. The back of the phone has a small 1.9-in cover screen, an improvement in size over the 1.1-in cover screen on the original Z Flip, which can be used to display the time, date and battery status, interact with notifications, answer phone calls and act as a viewfinder.

The phone is powered by the Qualcomm Snapdragon 888, with 8 GB of LPDDR5 RAM and 128 or 256 GB options of non-expandable UFS 3.1 storage. The Z Flip 3 features the same 3300 mAh dual battery that can fast charge using USB-C at up to 15 W or wirelessly via Qi at up to 10 W. The power button is embedded in the frame and doubles as the fingerprint sensor as well as a method to bring down the notification panel and launch Samsung Pay, with the volume rocker located above.

The phone features three cameras, with dual rear cameras, a 12MP wide-angle camera and a 12 MP ultra-wide camera to go along with a 10 MP front camera. The Z Flip 3 introduces an IPX8 water-resistant rating, which Samsung claims can survive being submerged 5 feet of water for up to 30 minutes.

== Critical reception ==
The Verge noted that the Galaxy Z Flip 3 felt like the first good folding phone on the market instead of a beta test. While improved durability claims were praised, the review still felt anxious about long-term durability regarding its flexible display. The tech website ExpertReviews.co.uk commented that the foldable phone market finally got a foldable phone that is worth buying. They gave 5/5 score to the device. Samuel Gibbs of The Guardian gave the phone a perfect score of five out of five in its review.

The Galaxy Z Flip 3 earned 83/100 from the tech reviewing site Techspot Metascore. Techspot also published 9.2/10.0 for the product's user score. According to Techspot, reviewers gave positive comments on pricing of the phone, water resistance, 1.9-inch cover screen with widgets, and high quality main screen. They also left positive reviews on the design and color of the product. On the other hand, reviewers left negative comments on the quality of the camera, thickness of the phone when folded, and relatively small battery. They also questioned long-term screen durability and potential 'crease' issues.

Negative viewpoints criticizes that they do not find the need of getting a foldable phone. Alex Perry of Mashable says that the Galaxy Z Flip 3 may be the best foldable phone in the market, but, regardless of its quality, "cannot for the life of me imagine buying one." The crease issue concerned many of the users because it was the biggest downside of a flip phone. According to Segan from PCMag, having a foldable phone is very innovative, but seeing crease is not appealing.

The Galaxy Z Flip 3's battery in particular has been negatively received. Jordan Palmer of Tom's Guide thought that the phone was too demanding for its small battery and called it a "flaw" that "ruins" the product. Android Authority's Dhruv Bhutani benchmarked a screen-on battery life of only four hours, adding that a slow charging rate of 15 W only amplified this usability problem. The website's author Ryne Hager claimed that some testers of the phone achieved as little as "2-3 hours of screen-on time in their normal workloads".

Chip magazine's runtime test of the battery life yielded a higher number of 8 hours and 41 minutes, but nevertheless it still labeled the battery as enttäuschend ("disappointing") compared to other phones at these premium prices. The review was highly critical of its charging performance, noting that it took as long as 2 hours and 15 minutes just to charge the Galaxy Z Flip 3's small 3,300 mAh battery. A long-term review of the phone by the GSMArena.com team in 2022 summed up the battery life as "This phone has provided us with the worst battery life we've ever seen on any device we've reviewed long-term. It's just atrocious. If you are anything but the lightest of phone users, buying a Flip3 will mean you'll need to think about charging it all the time."

== See also ==
- Samsung Galaxy Z series
- Samsung Galaxy Z Fold 3

Preceded by Samsung Galaxy Z Flip	Samsung Galaxy Z Flip 3; 2021	Succeeded by Samsung Galaxy Z Flip 4
