= Xiaomi Mi MIX =

Xiaomi smartphone

- Manufacturer: Xiaomi
- Type: Phablet
- Series: Mi MIX
- First released: 4 November 2016; 10 years ago
- Successor: Xiaomi Mi MIX 2
- Form factor: Slate
- Dimensions: 158.8 mm × 81.9 mm × 7.9 mm (6.25 in × 3.22 in × 0.31 in)
- Weight: 209 g (7.4 oz)
- Operating system: Original: Android 6.0.1 "Marshmallow" With MIUI 8 Current: MIUI 11 based on Android 8.0 "Oreo"
- System-on-chip: Qualcomm Snapdragon 821
- CPU: Quad-core (2×2.35 GHz Kryo & 2×2.19 GHz Kryo)
- GPU: Adreno 530
- Memory: 4 or 6 GB LPDDR4 RAM
- Storage: 128 or 256 GB UFS 2.0
- Battery: Non-removable 4400 mAh battery
- Rear camera: 16 MP (1 μm), f/2.0, 4K at 30 fps, 1080p at 30 fps, 720p at 120 fps
- Front camera: 5 MP
- Display: 2040×1080 1080p IPS LCD, 6.4 in (160 mm), (362 ppi)
- Connectivity: List: Wi-Fi; Wi-Fi Direct; Wi-Fi hotspot; GPS/GLONASS; NFC; Bluetooth 4.2; USB-C
- Data inputs: Sensors: Accelerometer; Barometer; Compass; Fingerprint scanner; Geomagnetic sensor; Gyroscope; Hall sensor; Proximity sensor
- Codename: Lithium
- Website: www.mi.com/en/mix/

The Xiaomi Mi MIX is an Android flagship smartphone manufactured by Xiaomi. It is designed by Philippe Starck, and awarded multiple top design awards for product design. It has been taken by multiple museums around the world as design collection, including Centre Pompidou in Paris and Design Museum. It is the world's 1st 3 border bezel-less phone category.

== Specifications ==
The Xiaomi Mi MIX's frame (including the back and side buttons) are made of ceramic. It features a 6.4 in (160 mm) a 17:9 aspect ratio display. It has an earpiece speaker made of a cantilever piezoelectric ceramic. The proximity sensor uses ultrasound radar instead of an infrared light. The premium version of the model is equipped with 6 GB RAM and 256 GB storage, and has 18k Gold decoration on the back plates. Mi MIX was on official Xiaomi Update until the end of year 2019, with the official MIUI 11 update having added full-screen gesture navigation, which made Mi MIX still work elegantly even after 3.5 years of its initial debut.

== Successors ==
The Xiaomi Mi MIX was succeeded by the Xiaomi Mi MIX 2 in September 2017, followed by the Xiaomi Mi MIX 3 on 25 October 2018 and the latest Xiaomi MIX 4 on 10 August 2021.

Device Name	Date of Announcement
Mi MIX 2	2017, September
Mi MIX 2S	2018, March
Mi MIX 3	2018, October
Mi MIX 3 5G	2019, February
Xiaomi MIX 4	2021, August

Xiaomi Mi MIX; 2016	Succeeded by Xiaomi Mi MIX 2
