= Xiaomi Mi MIX Alpha =

Android smartphone by Xiaomi

- Front view of the Mi MIX Alpha
- Brand: Xiaomi
- Manufacturer: Xiaomi Corporation
- Type: Phablet
- Series: Mi MIX
- Form factor: Slate
- Dimensions: 154.4 mm (6.08 in) H; 72.3 mm (2.85 in) W; 10.4 mm (0.41 in) D
- Weight: 241 g (8.5 oz)
- Operating system: Android 10, MIUI 11
- System-on-chip: Qualcomm Snapdragon 855+
- CPU: Octa-core (1x2.96 GHz, 3x2.42 GHz and 4x1.8 GHz) Kryo 485
- GPU: Adreno 640
- Memory: 12 GB LPDDR4X
- Storage: 512 GB UFS 3.0
- Removable storage: non-expandable
- Battery: 4050 mAh; 40W charging over USB-C
- Rear camera: 108 MP, f/1.7; 12 MP, f/2.0 telephoto, 2x optical zoom; 20 MP, f/2.2, ultra-wide-angle
- Display: Super AMOLED; 2088 × 2250, 7.92 in (20.1 cm), 388 ppi
- Connectivity: Bluetooth 5.0 Wi-Fi b/g/n/ac/ax 3G/LTE/5G
- Data inputs: Accelerometer; Barometer; Capacitive touchscreen; Fingerprint scanner (under display, optical); Gyroscope; Power button; Proximity sensor; Magnetometer
- Development status: Cancelled
- Website: www.mi.com/global/mi-mix-alpha

The Xiaomi Mi MIX Alpha is an Android-based smartphone designed by Xiaomi. Xiaomi describes it as a concept phone, but planned on bringing it into small-scale production. It was scheduled to be released in December 2019, but has been cancelled due to manufacturing complexities.

== Design ==
A 7.92-inch (201.2mm) big screen 2088 × 2250 Super AMOLED display is used which wraps around the edges and nearly spans the entire width of both sides. There are virtual volume buttons in place of physical ones, although there is a physical power button on the top. Navigation buttons and the status bar are also located on the edges of the device. A sapphire vertical strip is placed on the rear which houses the cameras, flash and connectivity antennas. The frame is a titanium alloy, while the display is a 3-section glass laminate.

== Specifications ==
=== Hardware ===
The Mi MIX Alpha is powered by the Qualcomm Snapdragon 855+ CPU and the Adreno 640 GPU, sharing its chipset with the Mi 9 Pro. It has a single configuration of 12 GB of LPDDR4X RAM and 512 GB of non-expandable UFS 3.0 storage. A USB-C port is located on the bottom which is capable of recharging the 4050mAh battery at up to 40W. An optical in-display fingerprint is used, and facial recognition is also supported.

==== Camera ====
A triple camera setup is used, consisting of a wide lens, a telephoto lens and an ultrawide lens like most flagships, while lacking a front-facing camera, however, the rear-facing cameras serve this purpose. Notably, it is the first smartphone with a 108 MP sensor. The other two lenses use 12 MP and 20 MP sensors respectively. None of the lenses have OIS, but HDR is supported. Along with normal recording modes, the device is capable of recording 8K video at 30 fps, 4K video at 60 fps and 30 fps, and 1080p slow-motion video at 480 and 960 fps.

=== Software ===
The Mi MIX Alpha runs on MIUI 11, which is based on Android 10.
