= Xiaomi Mi MIX 2S =

Android phablet manufactured by Xiaomi

- Manufacturer: Xiaomi
- Type: Phablet
- Series: Mi MIX
- First released: April 26, 2018; 8 years ago
- Predecessor: Xiaomi Mi MIX 2
- Successor: Xiaomi Mi MIX 3
- Form factor: Slate
- Dimensions: 151.8 mm × 75.5 mm × 7.7 mm (5.98 in × 2.97 in × 0.30 in)
- Weight: 191 g (6.7 oz)
- Operating system: Android 8.0 "Oreo" MIUI 9.5 (with Treble) upgradable to Android 9.0 "Pie" MIUI 10.x (with Treble) upgradable to Android 10 MIUI 12.x (with Treble)
- System-on-chip: Qualcomm Snapdragon 845
- CPU: Octa-core (4x2.8 GHz & 4x1.8 GHz) Kryo
- GPU: Adreno 630
- Memory: 6 or 8 GB LPDDR4x RAM
- Storage: 64, 128 or 256 GB UFS 2.1
- Battery: 3400 mAh,
- Rear camera: Dual 12 MP (1.4 μm), f/1.8 + 12 MP (1.0 μm), f/2.4, 4K at 60 fps, 1080p at 240 fps, 720p at 240 fps
- Front camera: 5 MP, f/2.0, OmniVision OV5675
- Display: 1080×2160 IPS LCD, 5.99 in (152 mm), (403 ppi)
- Connectivity: USB-C
- Data inputs: Sensors: Accelerometer; Barometer; Compass; Fingerprint scanner; Geomagnetic sensor; Gyroscope; Hall sensor; Proximity sensor
- Codename: Polaris
- Website: www.mi.com/en/mix2s/

Xiaomi Mi MIX 2S is an Android phablet manufactured by Xiaomi. Xiaomi unveiled a new version of the Mi MIX 2, the Mi MIX 2S, on 27 March 2018. Powered by the Qualcomm Snapdragon 845, it features the same 5.99 inches (152 mm) 1080p IPS LCD found on the Mi MIX 2, a new dual 12 MP camera, Qi wireless charging, and is pre-loaded with Android 8.0 Oreo. The Mi MIX 2S received a score of 97 on DxOMark.

== Design ==
The Mi MIX 2S featured a ceramic back and aluminum frame. The front-facing camera was placed in the right corner below the screen. The power button and volume rocker were on the right side. The SIM tray and MicroSD card slot were on the right. The USB-C port and mono speaker were on the bottom. The Mi MIX 2S did not have a 3.5mm audio jack. The phone's color variants included white and black. The fingerprint sensor was located on the back.

== Reception ==
In reviews, the general feedback was favorable, with critics praising the more accessible elements of it over the original Mi MIX such as worldwide LTE bands, a lower price than the original Mi MIX, a smaller display and a traditional earpiece speaker to replace the piezoelectric speaker in the original Mi Mix.

Reviewers noted that the ceramic was prone to fingerprint smudging. The device was also noted for its lack of waterproofing. It was also found the phone to underperform in low light compared to other similar phones. Digital Trends also encountered unusual software stability issues.

In August 2017, Mi MIX 2S was awarded the IDEA Gold Award for its design.

== Operating system ==
Android 9.0 "Pie" was released for the Mi MIX 2S on 30 October 2018.

Android 10.0 "Q" together with MIUI 11 was released for the Mi MIX 2S by end of 2019, and on 2020 was updated to MIUI 12. In Q3 2021 MI MIX was updated to MIUI 12.5.

Preceded by Xiaomi Mi MIX 2	Xiaomi Mi MIX 2S; 2018	Succeeded by Xiaomi Mi MIX 3
