= Xiaomi Mi MIX 3 =

Chinese smartphone by Xiaomi

- Manufacturer: Xiaomi
- Type: Phablet
- Series: Mi MIX
- First released: November 11, 2018; 7 years ago
- Predecessor: Xiaomi Mi MIX 2S
- Successor: Xiaomi MIX 4
- Form factor: Slider
- Dimensions: 157.9 mm × 74.7 mm × 8.5 mm (6.22 in × 2.94 in × 0.33 in)
- Weight: 218 g (7.7 oz)
- Operating system: Android 9.0 "Pie" MIUI
- System-on-chip: Qualcomm Snapdragon 845
- CPU: Octa-core (4x2.8 GHz & 4x1.7 GHz) Kryo
- GPU: Adreno 630
- Memory: 6, 8 or 10 GB LPDDR4x RAM
- Storage: 128 or 256 GB
- Battery: 3200 mAh
- Display: 1080 x 2340 pixels, 19.5:9 ratio (~403 ppi density) Super AMOLED
- Data inputs: Dual band GNSS (GPS/GLONASS/BeiDou/Galileo)
- Codename: perseus

The Xiaomi Mi MIX 3 is an Android smartphone launched in Beijing on 25 October 2018. It is the successor for the Mi MIX 2 and Mi MIX 2S. This time, Xiaomi uses a true bezel-less display with a magnetic sliding front camera setup.

The Xiaomi Mi MIX 3 has an overall score of 103 and a photo score of 108 on DxOMark.

Xiaomi unveiled a 5G version of the Mi MIX 3 on 24 February 2019 at MWC 2019. The Mi MIX 3 5G's hardware remains mostly the same; however, it has a newer Snapdragon 855 processor, a Qualcomm X50 5G modem, and a larger 3800 mAh battery. The Mi Mix 3 5G is also more expensive at 600 euros, or $680 (the regular Mi Mix 3 retails for 560 euros, or $535). It went on sale in May 2019, but is not available in Jade Green or Forbidden City Blue, and there is no longer a variant with 10 GB of RAM.

== Specifications ==
- Display: The Xiaomi Mi MIX 3 comes with a 6.4-inch 2340 x 1080 Full HD+ OLED panel with an aspect ratio of 19.5:9 and a screen-to-body ratio of 93.4%.
- Processor: The Mi MIX 3 is powered by the Qualcomm Snapdragon 845 octa-core processor and the Adreno 630 GPU.
- Camera: The Mi MIX 3 has 4 cameras, two at the front and two at the rear. The back of the phone sports a 12 MP Sony IMX363 with a f/1.8 aperture, 1.4-micron pixels, and a 12 MP Samsung S5K3M3+ with a f/2.4 aperture, 1-micron pixels. It also supports optical image stabilization (OIS) and 960FPS slow-motion videos. There is a 24 MP Sony IMX576 sensor with 1.8-micron pixels and a 2 MP depth sensor with AI features on the front slider area of the device.
- RAM and Storage: The Mi MIX 3 has 4 variants: 6 GB RAM/128 GB, 8 GB RAM/128 GB, 8 GB RAM/256 GB and 10 GB RAM/256 GB.
- Battery: The Mi MIX 3 has a 3200 mAh battery with 10 W wireless charging.
- Software: The Xiaomi Mi MIX 3 runs on MIUI 10 based on Android 9 Pie.
- SIM:
  - 4G variant: dual nano SIMs, - Simultaneous standby 4G w/VoLTE HD on both SIMS.
  - 5G variant: single nano SIM.
