= Xiaomi Mi 9 Pro =

2019 Smartphones manufactured by Xiaomi

Xiaomi Mi 9 Pro 5G
- Developer: Xiaomi
- Manufacturer: Xiaomi
- Series: Mi
- Successor: Xiaomi Mi 10 Pro; Xiaomi Mi 10 Ultra
- Related: Xiaomi Mi 9 Xiaomi Mi 9 Lite; Xiaomi Mi 9 SE
- Form factor: Slate
- Dimensions: 157.2 x 74.6 x 8.5 mm (6.19 x 2.94 x 0.33 in)
- Weight: 196 g (6.91 oz)
- Operating system: Original: MIUI 10 based on Android 9 Pie; Current: MIUI 13 based on Android 11
- System-on-chip: Qualcomm Snapdragon 855+
- CPU: Octa-core (1x2.96 GHz Kryo 485 & 3x2.42 GHz Kryo 485 & 4x1.8 GHz Kryo 485)
- GPU: Adreno 640 (700 MHz)
- Memory: 8GB or 12GB RAM
- Storage: 128GB, 256GB and 512GB
- Battery: Non-removable Li-Po 4000 mAh battery
- Charging: Fast battery charging 40W (Quick Charge 4+) Fast wireless charging 30W Power bank/Reverse wireless charging 10W
- Rear camera: Triple-Camera Setup; Primary: Sony IMX 586; 48 MP, f/1.75, 27mm, FOV 79°, 1/2.0", 0.8μm, PDAF; Telephoto: 12 MP, f/2.2, 54mm, FOV 43.6°, 1/3.6", 1.0μm, PDAF, 2x optical zoom; Ultrawide: Sony IMX 481; 16 MP, f/2.2, 13mm, FOV 117°, 1/3.0", 1.0μm, AF; Features: Laser AF, Dual-LED flash, HDR, panorama; Video: 4K@30/60fps, 1080p@30/120/240fps, 1080p@960fps
- Front camera: 20 MP, f/2.0, (wide), 1/3.0", 0.9μm; Features: HDR; Video: 1080p@30fps
- Display: Super AMOLED capacitive touchscreen, 16M colors 6.39 inches, 100.2 cm2 (~85.5% screen-to-body ratio) 1080 x 2340 pixels, 19.5:9 ratio (~403 ppi density) Gorilla Glass 6 DCI-P3 HDR10
- Sound: Loudspeaker
- Connectivity: Wi-Fi 802.11 a/b/g/n/ac, dual-band, Wi-Fi Direct, DLNA, hotspot Bluetooth 5.0, A2DP, LE, aptX HD GPS with dual-band A-GPS, GLONASS, BDS, GALILEO, QZSS NFC Infrared port USB 2.0, Type-C 1.0 reversible connector, USB On-The-Go
- Codename: crux

The Xiaomi Mi 9 Pro 5G is a flagship Android smartphone developed by Xiaomi. It was announced in September 2019 as an upgraded version of the Mi 9.

== Specifications ==
=== Design ===
The Xiaomi Mi 9 Pro 5G is similar to the Mi 9 externally, with Gorilla Glass 6 on both the front and rear and a 7000 series aluminum frame. It is available in Dream White or Titanium Black.

=== Hardware ===
The Xiaomi Mi 9 Pro 5G is powered by the Qualcomm Snapdragon 855+ SoC, with 8 GB or 12 GB of LPDDR4X RAM and the Adreno 640 GPU. Storage options include 128 GB, 256 GB, or 512 GB. The display remains the same, with a 6.39-inch (162.3 mm) 1080p (1080 × 2340) AMOLED panel and an 85.5% screen-to-body ratio. The battery is larger at 4000 mAh, and supports 40 W fast charging over USB-C with 30 W fast wireless charging. It can also charge other Qi-compatible smartphones at 10 W. The under-display optical fingerprint sensor is carried over from the Mi 9. The cameras are unchanged as well, with a 48 MP main camera, a 12 MP telephoto lens with 2x optical zoom and a 16 MP ultrawide lens at the rear, with a 20 MP front camera.

=== Software ===
It runs on Android 9 Pie, with Xiaomi's custom MIUI 10 skin. Later it was updated to MIUI 13 based on Android 11.
